= Almedalen Week =

Annual political forum in Visby, Sweden

Coordinates: 57.6406°N 18.2908°E

Almedalen Week Almedalsveckan
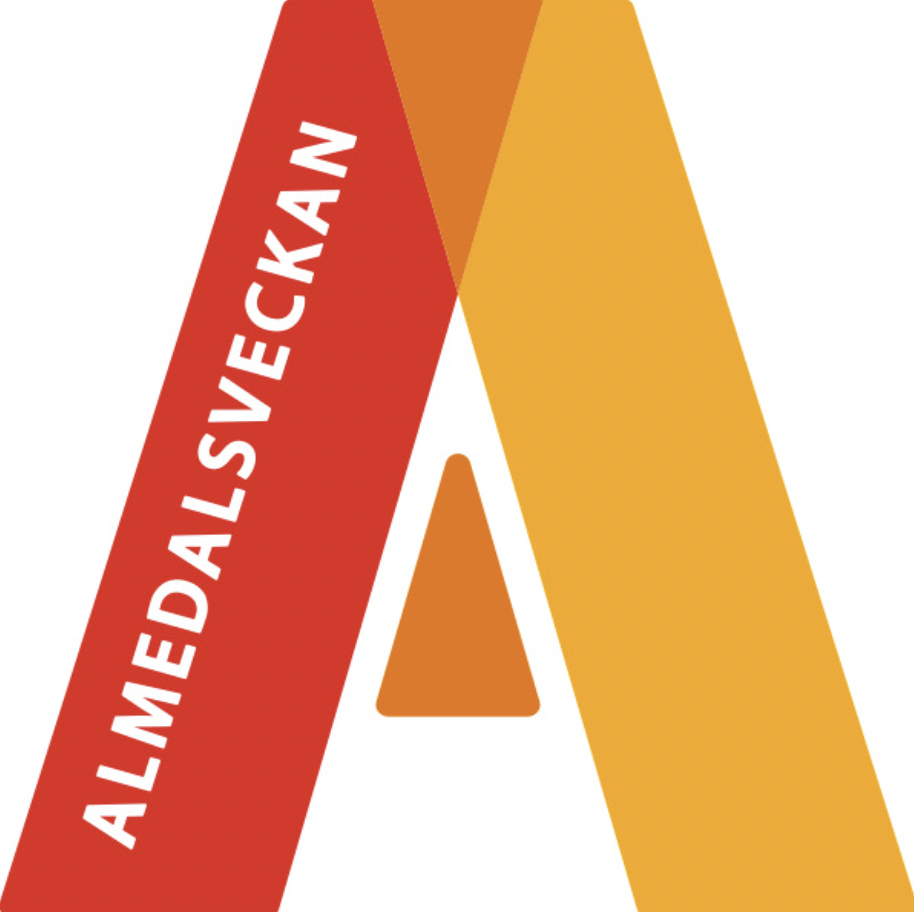

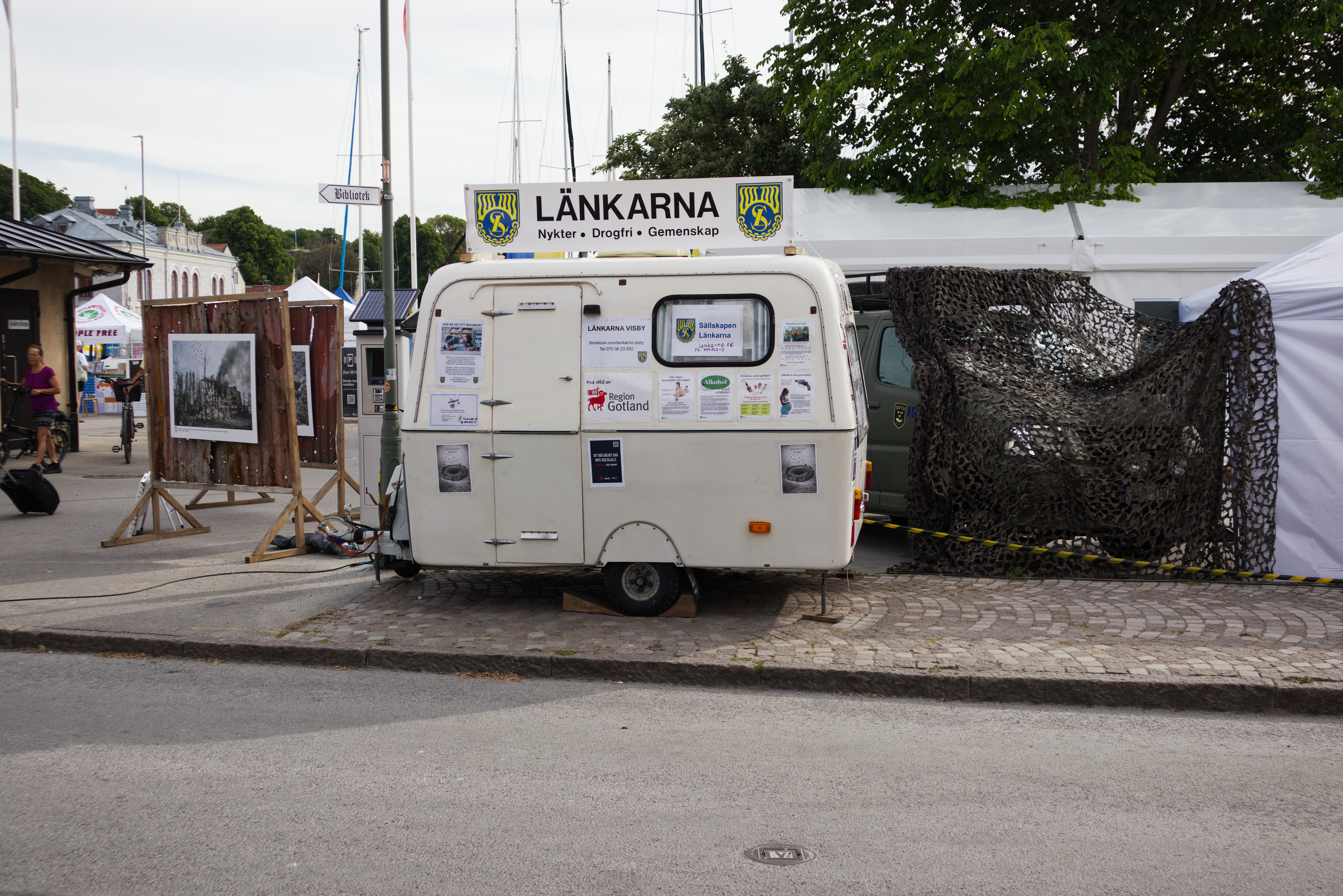
- Nickname: Palmedalen
- Status: Active
- Frequency: Annually
- Venue: Almedalen
- Locations: Visby, Gotland
- Country: Sweden
- Years active: 58
- Inaugurated: July 25, 1968
- Previous event: 22–26 June 2026
- Next event: 28 June - 2 July 2027
- Organiser: Gotland Municipality
- Website: almedalsveckan.info

The Almedalen Week (Swedish: Almedalsveckan, [ˈâlmɛdɑːlsˌvɛkːan]), also known as Politician's Week in Almedalen (Swedish: Politikerveckan i Almedalen) is an annual event taking place in week 26 in and around Almedalen, a park in the city of Visby, Gotland, Sweden.

With speeches, seminars and other political activities, it is considered to be the most important forum in Swedish politics. During the week, representatives from the major political parties in Sweden take turns to make speeches in Almedalen.

It has inspired similar events to be held in other countries, like Suomi-Areena in Finland, Arendalsuka in Norway, Arvamusfestival in Estonia and Folkemødet at the island of Bornholm in Denmark.

== History ==
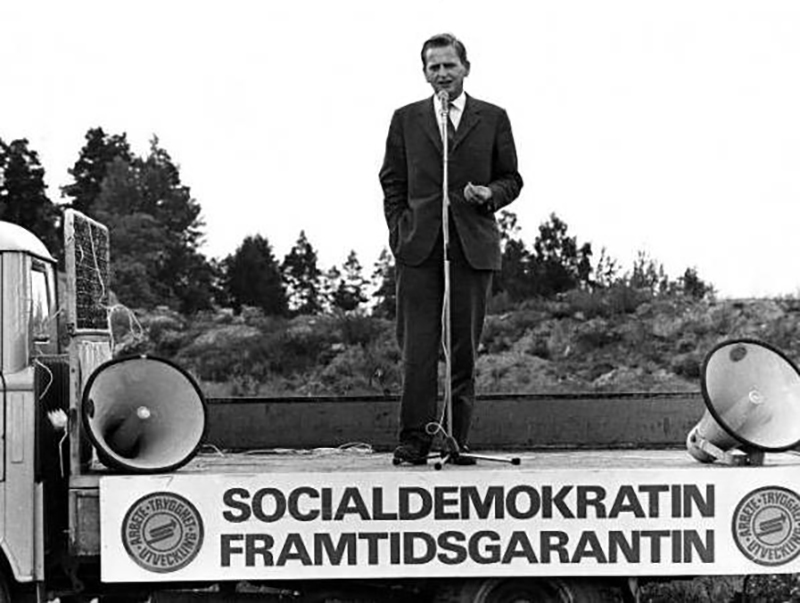
Olof Palme speaking in 1968

The origin of the Almedalen Week was the speeches made by Olof Palme during several summers in Almedalen. He was in Visby because he and his family used to spend their summers at Fårö. It started with an improvised gathering that Palme, then education minister and candidate for the position of party leader for the Social Democratic party, and another party leader candidate, Krister Wickman had on 25 July 1968. Palme made his speech from the back of a flatbed truck at Kruttornet by the Almedalen park. The audience was a couple of hundred people.

Because of the origin of the Almedalen Week, Almedalen is sometimes nicknamed "Palmedalen".

The first official Almedalen Week took place in 1982, when the Social Democrats started to organise economic seminars. As a response, the other political parties started to take a more active part. The first time all of the major party leaders were present was in 1982.

In the middle of the 1980s, the week almost ceased to be. In the summer following the assassination of Olof Palme in 1986, only the Green Party and the Left Party were present. The rest of the parties expressed that political speeches in Almedalen were too associated with Palme as a person. Ingvar Carlsson, who became prime minister after Palme's death, said that he chose to hold his speeches at other locations in Visby during the following years out of respect for Palme. He only started speaking in Almedalen after having been persuaded to do so by Palme's widow, Lisbet Palme.

=== 21st century ===
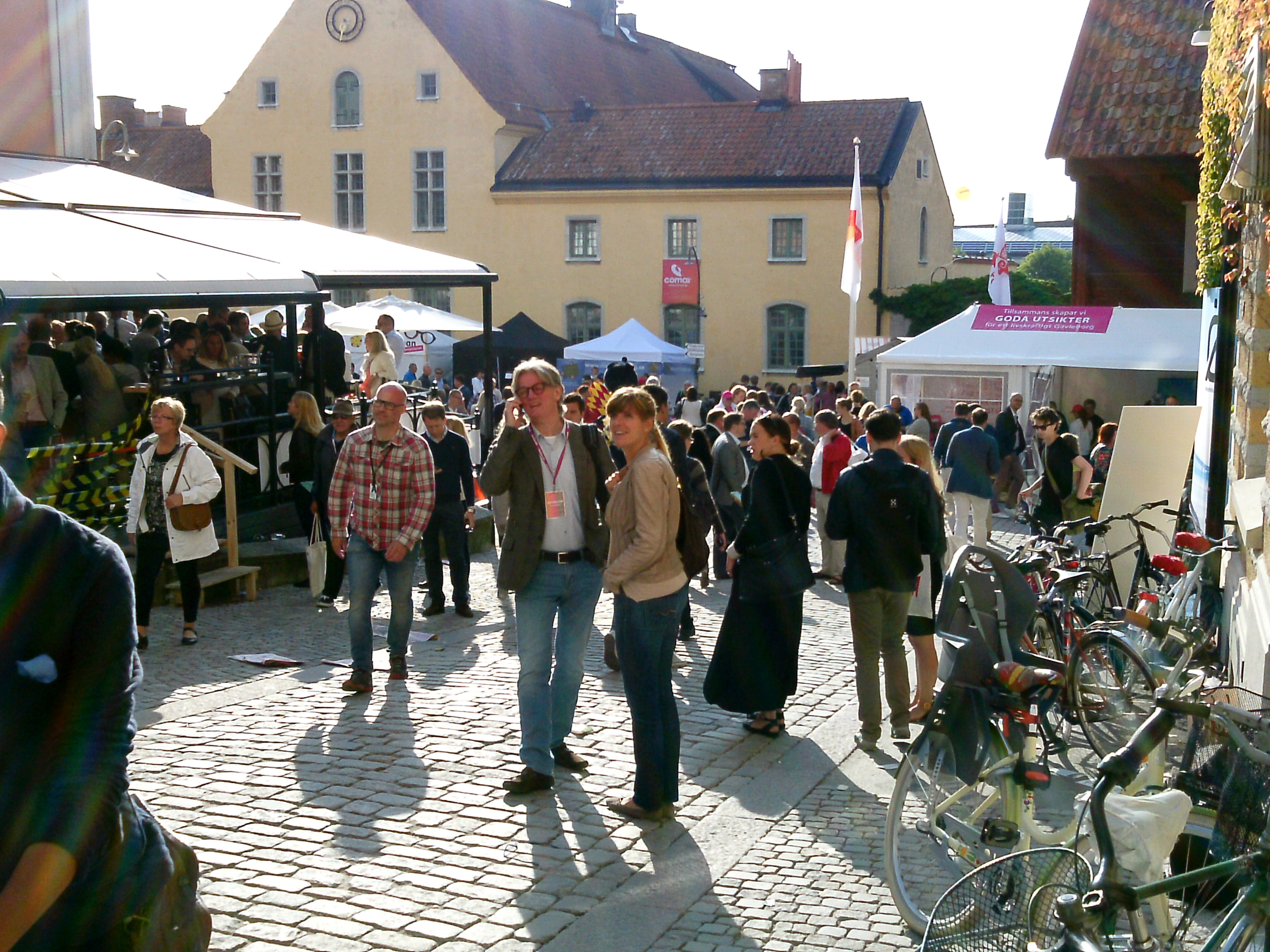
Mingling at Almedalen Week in 2014

In recent years, the event has grown larger, with hordes of journalists, lobbyists, local and national politicians, employees from local, regional and national organisations and representatives of non-governmental organizations all coming to Visby to meet, discuss politics and socialize. As of 2015, it is the biggest and most important forum in Sweden for seminars, debates and political speeches on current social issues. In 2014, 3,513 activities were held, 866 journalists were accredited and over 30,000 participants were at the event. One important factor is that all seminars are free of charge. The absolute majority of them are also open to everybody.

On 6 July 2022, during a speech the psychiatrist Ing-Marie Wieselgren died after being stabbed by a right-wing extremist. The stabbing occurred near to a stage where Centre Party leader Annie Lööf was about to give a press conference. After the fatal stabbing, the perpetrator was apprehended by a pensioner and shortly thereafter arrested by police.

The number of activities, participants and journalists covering the week has increased during the years. These are the official numbers:

Year	Activities	Organizers	Accredited journalists	Participants
2016	3,796	1,756	650	40,000
2015	3,465	1,645	800	35,000
2014*	3,513	1,459	866	35,000
2013	2,285	1,029	727	20,000
2012	1,818	986	709	17,000
2011	1,476	767	560	14,000
2010*	1,396	758	900	11,000
2009	1,041	589	450	7,500
2008	662	350	362	6,000
2007	440	225	318	5,000
2006*	463	c. 175	c. 500	n/a
2005	250	c. 120	c. 200	n/a
2004	140	n/a	c. 120	n/a
2003	110	n/a	n/a	n/a
2002*	90	n/a	c. 110	n/a
2001	52	n/a	n/a	n/a
* = election year

== Organization ==
Almedalen Week is an annual event taking place in week 26 in and around Almedalen, a park in the city of Visby. It is coordinated by Gotland Municipality and the cost of the different activities is carried by the organization responsible for it. Each day of the week is dedicated to one of the political parties represented in the Riksdag, on a rotating schedule. In 2011, the number of days were extended to eight since there were then eight parties in the Riksdag. A number of other lobbyists, organizations, companies and representatives from municipalities and countries are also present.

== Awareness ==
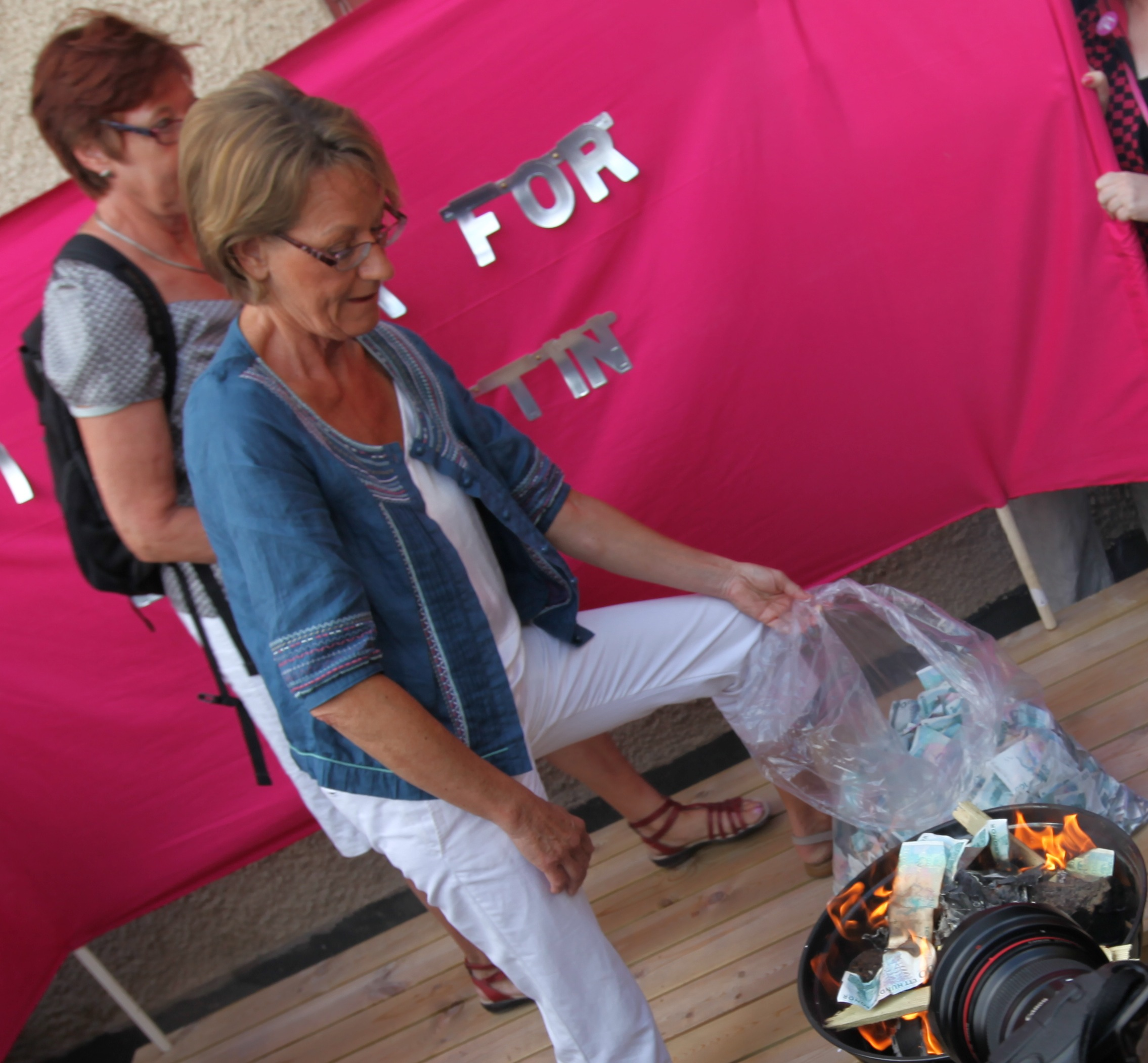
Gudrun Schyman sets fire to money

With the increasing numbers of activities it has become more difficult for the individual participants to get noticed by spectators and the media. This has resulted in a number of spectacular actions during the years. In 2010, the spokesperson for the Feminist Initiative, Gudrun Schyman, burned SEK 100,000 during a speech about the inequality in wages for men and women. In 2005, actress Kim Anderzon, artist Ernst Billgren, musician Olle Ljungström, among others, declared that a new party, the Kulturpartiet (the Cultural Party), had been created and that they were candidates for the Riksdag. It was later declared that the party had been an elaborate hoax created by the National Swedish Touring Theatre to raise awareness for cultural issues.

== Criticism ==
Political scientist Maria Wendt has criticized the Almedalen Week and states that it has clarified how much politics in Sweden have become dependent on media, and now conforms to the terms and tools of the press, TV, radio and websites. Wendt says that whereas earlier media would report what went on in politics, it is presently more common to have debates taking place in the media itself. The language and messages delivered by politicians are conformed to fit in the frames provided by TV and newspapers, making comments short, powerful and lacking in nuances. The Almedalen Week is an event where such shortcomings are becoming more visible, according to Wendt. She suggested that instead of dedicating each day to one of the parties, the days should be used to highlight specific issues.

During the Almedalen Week journalists, politicians and lobbyists socialize in a way that under normal circumstances would not be considered correct. This has been compared to a liminal phase, a term used in social anthropology for when normal rules cease to apply for a short while, like during carnivals, after which everything returns to normal. What has previously been taboo, is allowed for a short while.

== Similar events in other countries ==
Similar events have been held in Finland, Denmark and Norway. The Finnish event is called SuomiAreena, started in 2006 in the city of Pori. The Danish event Folkemødet was started in 2011, on the Bornholm island. A Norwegian version of the week was held at Eidsvoll. The event was scheduled to take place in Arendal again in 2011, but was postponed because of the 2011 Norway attacks. The event is now back. In 2007, a South Korean delegation came to Visby to study the concept of the Almedalen Week. According to political scientist Yonhyok Choe, the island of Jeju is a likely candidate for the event. In 2013, the Arvamusfestival in Estonia was started.

== Quote ==
Almedalen Week visitor Dennis Kucinich commented on the event:

When you see the kind of internecine conflict that happens in the United States— the partisan divide, the dichotomous thinking, the separation from each other—there is a different thing happening here in Sweden at Almedalen, which is a sense of a common bond as citizens with a common purpose for the nation. And people come together here. And the thing that impresses me is how quickly on the street you can get into the deepest discussions that have consequence. And so, that's why—you know, having been here only for two days, I've had a chance to meet people from every level of society, decision makers as well as citizens, and there's a sense that things matter in these kind of discussions, which are direct, relatively low-key, nonconfrontational, matter-of-fact. And behind it is— what animates it is a sense of commitment to each other and to the nation.

In 2014, the Almedalen Week was profiled by the US program Democracy Now!.

== Speakers ==
These are the main speakers since 1968 in chronological order.

1968-1974

- Olof Palme (S)

1975

- Thage G. Peterson (S)
- Lars Werner (VPK)

1976

- Olof Palme (S)
- Lars Werner (VPK)

1977

- Olof Palme (S)
- Olof Johansson (C)
- Lars Werner (VPK)

1978

- Olof Palme (S)
- Lars Werner (VPK)

1979

- Olof Palme (S)
- Lars Werner (VPK)
- Karin Söder (C)

1980

- Olof Palme (S)
- Anders Dahlgren (C)
- Lars Werner (VPK)

1981

- Olof Palme (S)
- Thorbjörn Fälldin (C)
- Lars Werner (VPK)

1982

- Olof Palme (S)
- Ulf Adelsohn (M)
- Thorbjörn Fälldin (C)
- Alf Svensson (KD)
- Lars Werner (VPK)
- Ragnhild Pohanka (MP)

1983

- Olof Palme (S)
- Alf Svensson (KD)
- Lars Werner (VPK)

1984

- Olof Palme (S)
- Lennart Daléus (C)
- Alf Svensson (KD)
- Lars Werner (VPK)
- Björn Eliasson (MP)

1985

- Olof Palme (S)
- Thorbjörn Fälldin (C)
- Alf Svensson (KD)
- Lars Werner (VPK)
- Ragnhild Pohanka och Per Gahrton (MP)

1986

- Alf Svensson (KD)
- Lars Werner (VPK)
- Eva Goës och Birger Schlaug (MP)

1987

- Ingvar Carlsson (S)
- Görel Thurdin (C)
- Alf Svensson (KD)
- Lars Werner (VPK)
- Eva Goës och Birger Schlaug (MP)

1988

- Ingvar Carlsson (S)
- Olof Johansson (C)
- Alf Svensson (KD)
- Lars Werner (VPK)
- Eva Goës (MP)

1989

- Ingvar Carlsson (S)
- Olof Johansson (C)
- Alf Svensson (KD)
- Lars Werner (VPK)
- Per Gahrton (MP)

1990

- Ingvar Carlsson (S)
- Görel Thurdin (C)
- Mats Odell (KD)
- Lennart Beijer (VPK)
- Jan Axelsson (MP)

1991 (14–20 July)

- Gullan Lindblad (M)
- Alf Svensson (KD)
- Lars Werner (V)
- Ingvar Carlsson (S)
- Olof Johansson (C)
- Birgit Friggebo (FP)
- Margareta Gisselberg och Jan Axelsson (MP)

1992 (12–18 July)

- Ian Wachtmeister (NYD)
- Birger Schlaug och Marianne Samuelsson (MP)
- Görel Thurdin (C)
- Ingvar Carlsson (S)
- Lars Werner (V)
- Anne Wibble (FP)
- Mats Odell (KD)

1993 (17–24 July)

- Ulf Dinkelspiel (M)
- Ian Wachtmeister och Bert Karlsson (NYD)
- Birger Schlaug och Marianne Samuelsson (MP)
- Helena Nilsson (C)
- Ingvar Carlsson (S)
- Gudrun Schyman (V)
- Anne Wibble (FP)
- Alf Svensson (KD)

1994 (17–23 July)

- Vivianne Franzén (NYD)
- Alf Svensson (KD)
- Olof Johansson (C)
- Ingvar Carlsson (S)
- Gudrun Schyman (V)
- Bengt Westerberg och Anne Wibble (FP)
- Birger Schlaug och Marianne Samuelsson (MP)

1995 (19–24 July)

- Ingvar Carlsson (S)
- Alf Svensson (KD)
- Birger Schlaug och Marianne Samuelsson (MP)
- Gudrun Schyman (V)
- Björn Brissund (Gotlandic party)
- Olof Johansson (C)
- Vivianne Franzen och Sven Dybeck (NYD)

1996 (14–19 July)

- Gunilla Segerlund, Björn Brissund, Odd
  Magnusson och Torsten Andersson (Gotlandic party)
- Alf Svensson (KD)
- Marianne Samuelsson (MP)
- Ingvar Carlsson (S)
- Johan Lönnroth (V)
- Olof Johansson (C)

1997 (14–19 July)

- Olof Johansson (C)
- Ingela Thalén (S)
- Alf Svensson (KD)
- Birger Schlaug (MP)
- Gudrun Schyman (V)

1998 (11–17 July)

- Lars Leijonborg (FP)
- Gudrun Schyman (V)
- Lennart Daléus (C)
- Margot Wallström (S)
- Alf Svensson (KD)
- Birger Schlaug och Marianne Samuelsson (MP)

1999 (11–16 July)

- Birger Schlaug (MP)
- Gudrun Schyman (V)
- Andreas Carlgren (C)
- Anna Lindh (S)
- Alf Svensson (KD)

2000 (10–14 July)

- Alf Svensson (KD)
- Matz Hammarström (MP)
- Thomas Östros (S)
- Lars Ohly (V)
- Lennart Daléus (C)

2001 (8–13 July)

- Maud Olofsson (C)
- Alf Svensson (KD)
- Lars Stjernkvist (S)
- Matz Hammarström och Lotta Hedström (MP)
- Pernilla Zethraeus (V)

2002 (6–14 July)

- Gudrun Schyman (V)
- Lars Leijonborg (FP)
- Maud Olofsson (C)
- Göran Persson (S)
- Alf Svensson (KD)
- Maria Wetterstrand och Peter Eriksson (MP)
- Lars Olof Andersson (Gotlandic party)

2003 (6–12 July)

- Bo Lundgren (M)
- Ulla Hoffmann (V)
- Lars Leijonborg och Marit Paulsen (FP)
- Maud Olofsson (C)
- Anna Lindh (S)
- Alf Svensson (KD)
- Peter Eriksson (MP)

2004 (4–10 July)

- Håkan Wåhlstedt (MP)
- Fredrik Reinfeldt (M)
- Lars Ohly (V)
- Maria Carlshamre (FP)
- Maud Olofsson (C)
- Bosse Ringholm (S)
- Göran Hägglund (KD)

2005 (3–9 July)

- Göran Hägglund (KD)
- Maria Wetterstrand (MP)
- Fredrik Reinfeldt (M)
- Marita Ulvskog (S)
- Lars Leijonborg (FP)
- Maud Olofsson (C)
- Lars Ohly (V)

2006 (3–9 July)

- Göran Persson (S)
- Göran Hägglund (KD)
- Maria Wetterstrand och Peter Eriksson (MP)
- Fredrik Reinfeldt (M)
- Lars Ohly (V)
- Lars Leijonborg (FP)
- Maud Olofsson (C)

2007 (8–14 July)

- Andreas Carlgren (C)
- Mona Sahlin (S)
- Göran Hägglund (KD)
- Peter Eriksson (MP)
- Anders Borg (M)
- Lars Ohly (V)
- Nyamko Sabuni (FP)

2008 (6–12 July)

- Jan Björklund (FP)
- Maud Olofsson (C)
- Mona Sahlin (S)
- Göran Hägglund (KD)
- Maria Wetterstrand (MP)
- Fredrik Reinfeldt (M)
- Lars Ohly (V)

2009 (28 June–4 July)

- Lars Ohly (V)
- Jan Björklund (FP)
- Maud Olofsson (C)
- Mona Sahlin (S)
- Göran Hägglund (KD)
- Peter Eriksson (MP)
- Fredrik Reinfeldt (M)

2010 (4–10 July)

- Fredrik Reinfeldt (M)
- Lars Ohly (V)
- Jan Björklund (FP)
- Maud Olofsson (C)
- Mona Sahlin (S)
- Göran Hägglund (KD)
- Maria Wetterstrand och Peter Eriksson (MP)

2011 (3–10 July)

- Åsa Romson och Gustav Fridolin (MP)
- Fredrik Reinfeldt (M)
- Lars Ohly (V)
- Jan Björklund (FP)
- Maud Olofsson (C)
- Håkan Juholt (S)
- Göran Hägglund (KD)
- Jimmie Åkesson (SD)

2012 (1–8 July)

- Jimmie Åkesson (SD)
- Åsa Romson (MP)
- Fredrik Reinfeldt (M)
- Jonas Sjöstedt (V)
- Jan Björklund (FP)
- Annie Lööf (C)
- Stefan Löfven (S)
- Göran Hägglund (KD)

2013 (30 June–7 July)

- Göran Hägglund (KD)
- Jimmie Åkesson (SD)
- Gustav Fridolin (MP)
- Fredrik Reinfeldt (M)
- Jonas Sjöstedt (V)
- Jan Björklund(FP)
- Annie Lööf (C)
- Stefan Löfven (S)

2014 (29 June–6 July)

- Stefan Löfven (S)
- Göran Hägglund (KD)
- Jimmie Åkesson (SD)
- Åsa Romson (MP)
- Fredrik Reinfeldt (M)
- Jonas Sjöstedt (V)
- Jan Björklund (FP)
- Annie Lööf (C)

2015 (28 June–5 July)

- Annie Lööf (C)
- Stefan Löfven (S)
- Ebba Busch (KD)
- Jimmie Åkesson (SD)
- Gustav Fridolin (MP)
- Anna Kinberg Batra (M)
- Jonas Sjöstedt (V)
- Jan Björklund (FP)
- Gudrun Schyman (FI)
  (on 6 July outside the official week)

2016 (3 July–10 July)

- Jan Björklund (L)
- Annie Lööf (C)
- Stefan Löfven (S)
- Ebba Busch (KD)
- Jimmie Åkesson (SD)
- Isabella Lövin (MP)
- Anna Kinberg Batra (M)
- Jonas Sjöstedt (V)

2017 (2 July–9 July)

- Jonas Sjöstedt (V)
- Jan Björklund (L)
- Annie Lööf (C)
- Magdalena Andersson (S)
- Ebba Busch (KD)
- Jimmie Åkesson (SD)
- Gustav Fridolin (MP)
- Anna Kinberg Batra (M)

2018 (1 July-8 July)

- Ulf Kristersson (M)
- Jonas Sjöstedt (V)
- Jan Björklund (L)
- Annie Lööf (C)
- Stefan Löfven (S)
- Ebba Busch (KD)
- Jimmie Åkesson (SD)
- Isabella Lövin (MP)

2019 (30 June-7 July)

- Per Bolund (MP)
- Ulf Kristersson (M)
- Jonas Sjöstedt (V)
- Nyamko Sabuni (L)
- Annie Lööf (C)
- Magdalena Andersson (S)
- Ebba Busch Thor (KD)
- Jimmie Åkesson (SD)

2020 (planned 28 June-5 July)

- Cancelled due to the COVID-19 pandemic

2021 (4–7 juli)

- Nooshi Dadgostar (V)
- Ebba Busch (KD)
- Nyamko Sabuni (L)
- Jimmie Åkesson (SD)
- Annie Lööf (C)
- Märta Stenevi (MP)
- Stefan Löfven (S)
- Ulf Kristersson (M)

== Gallery ==
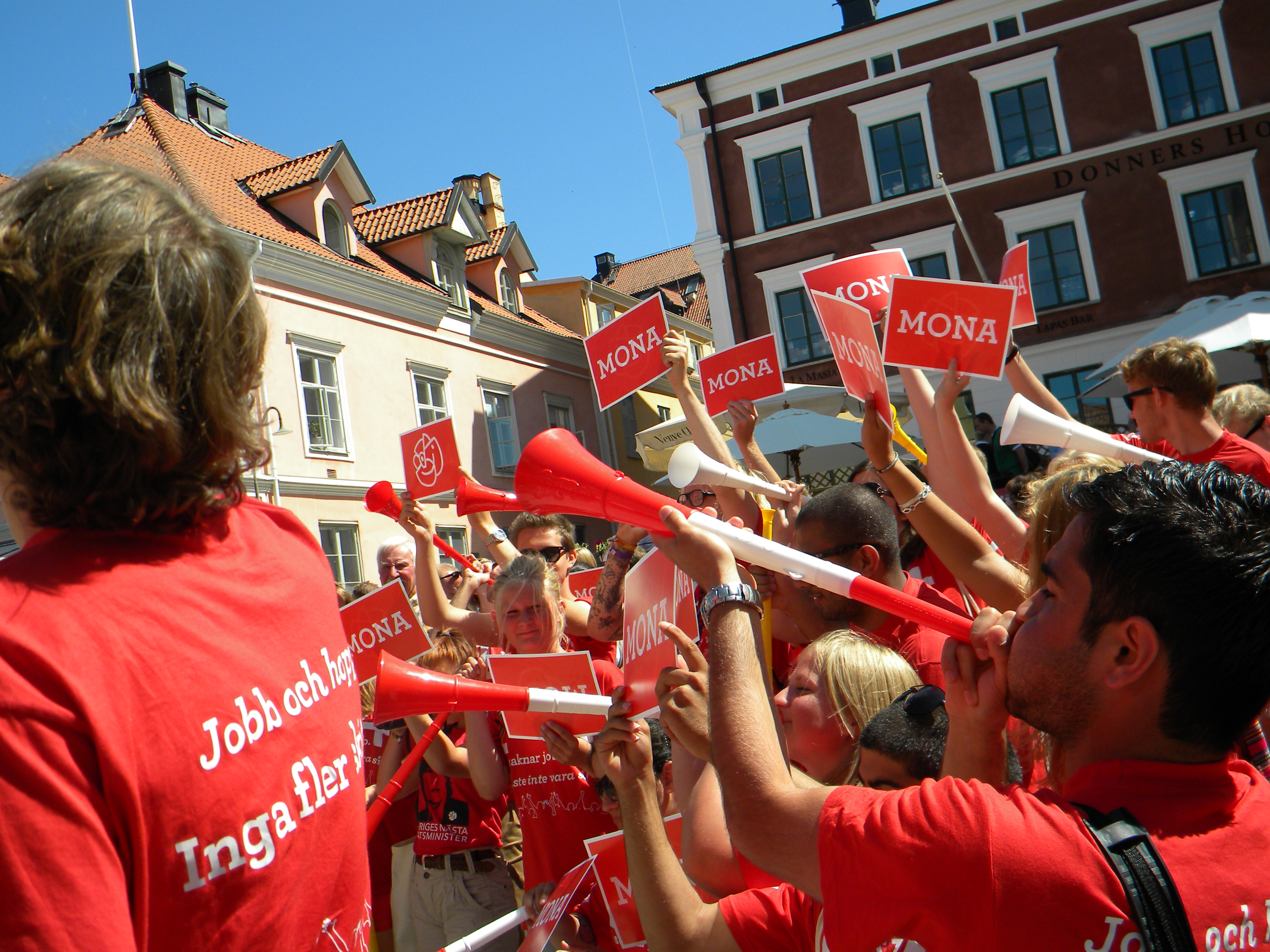
2010 – Red/Green campaign

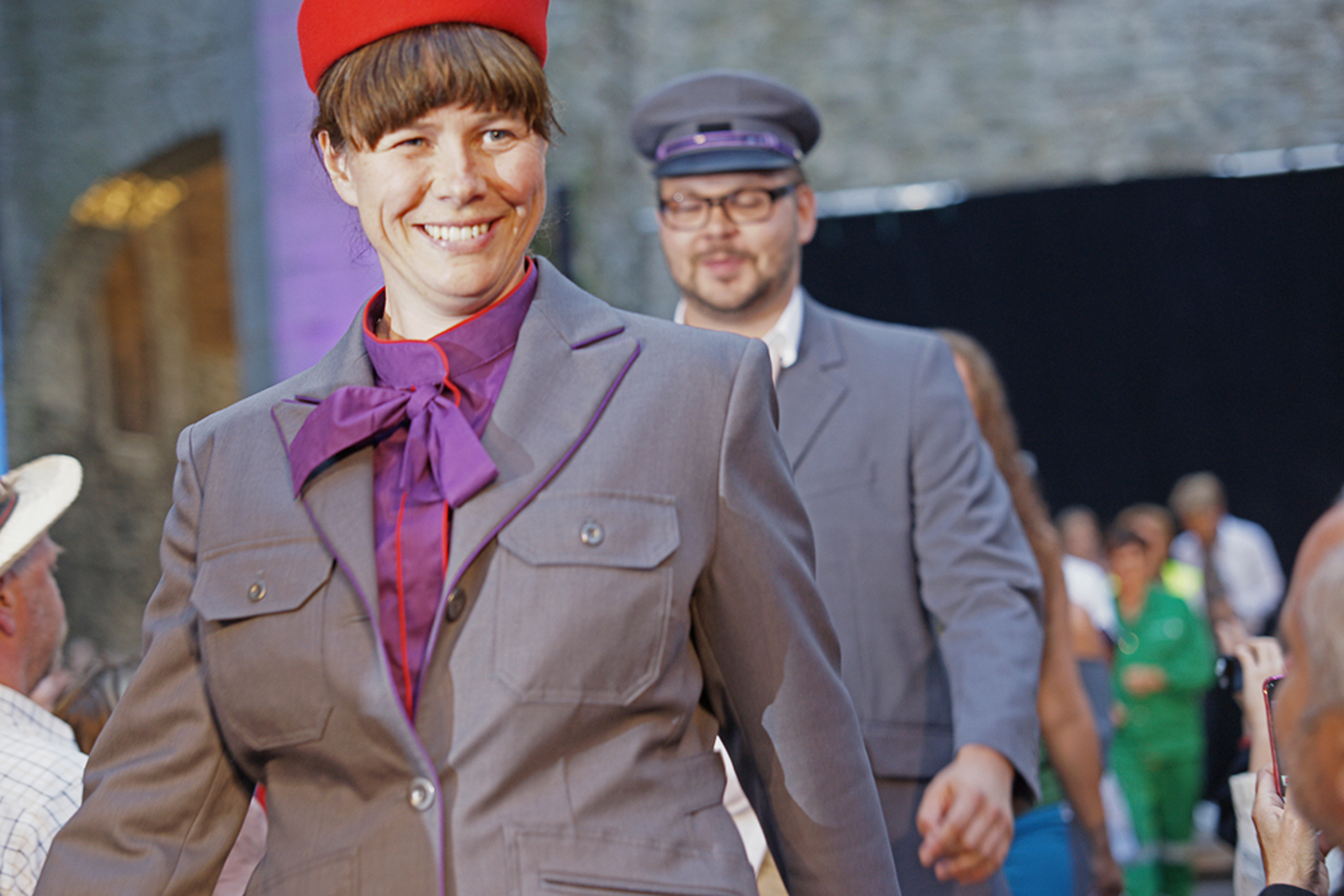
2011 – Åsa Romson

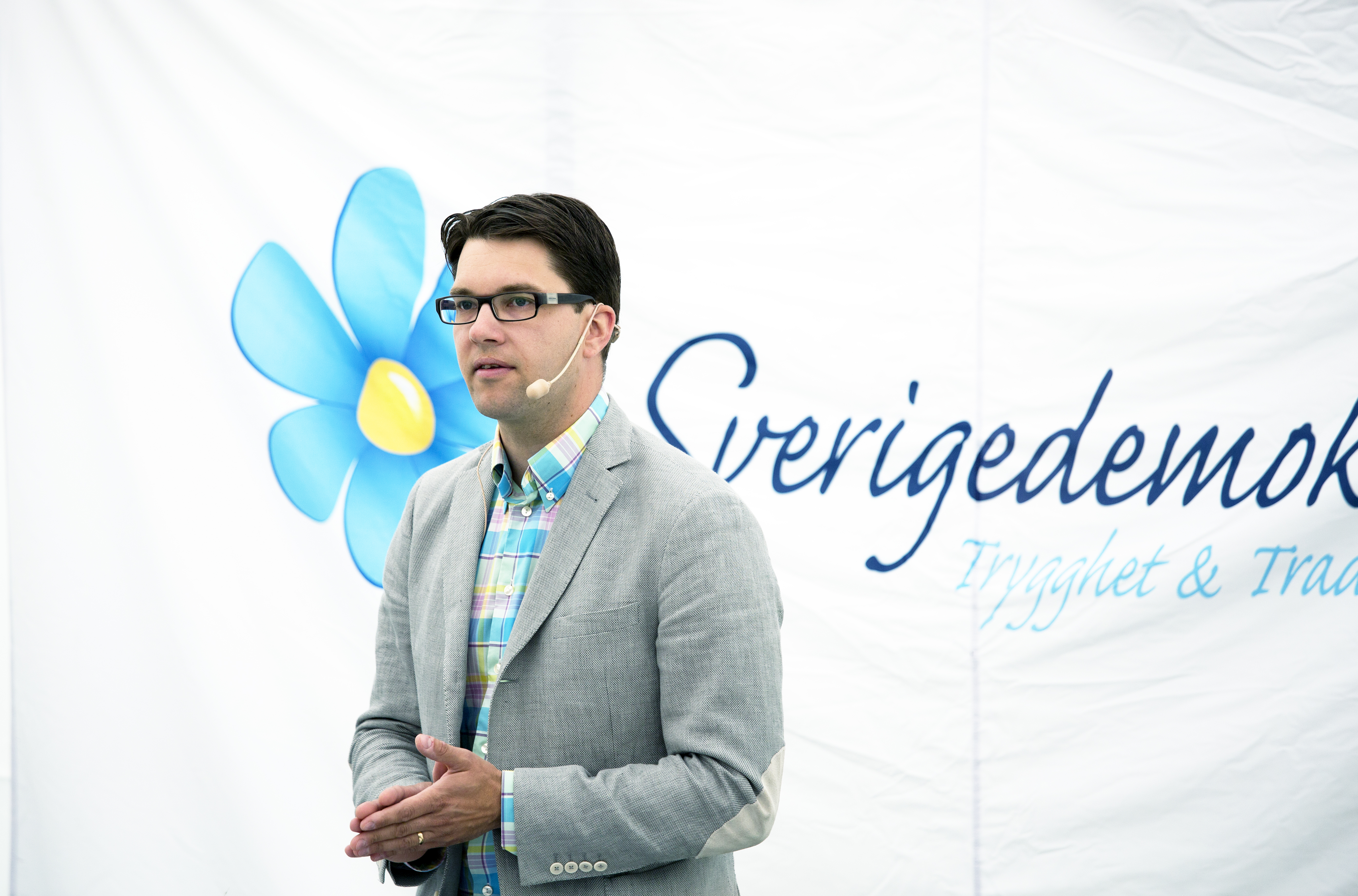
2013 – Jimmie Åkesson

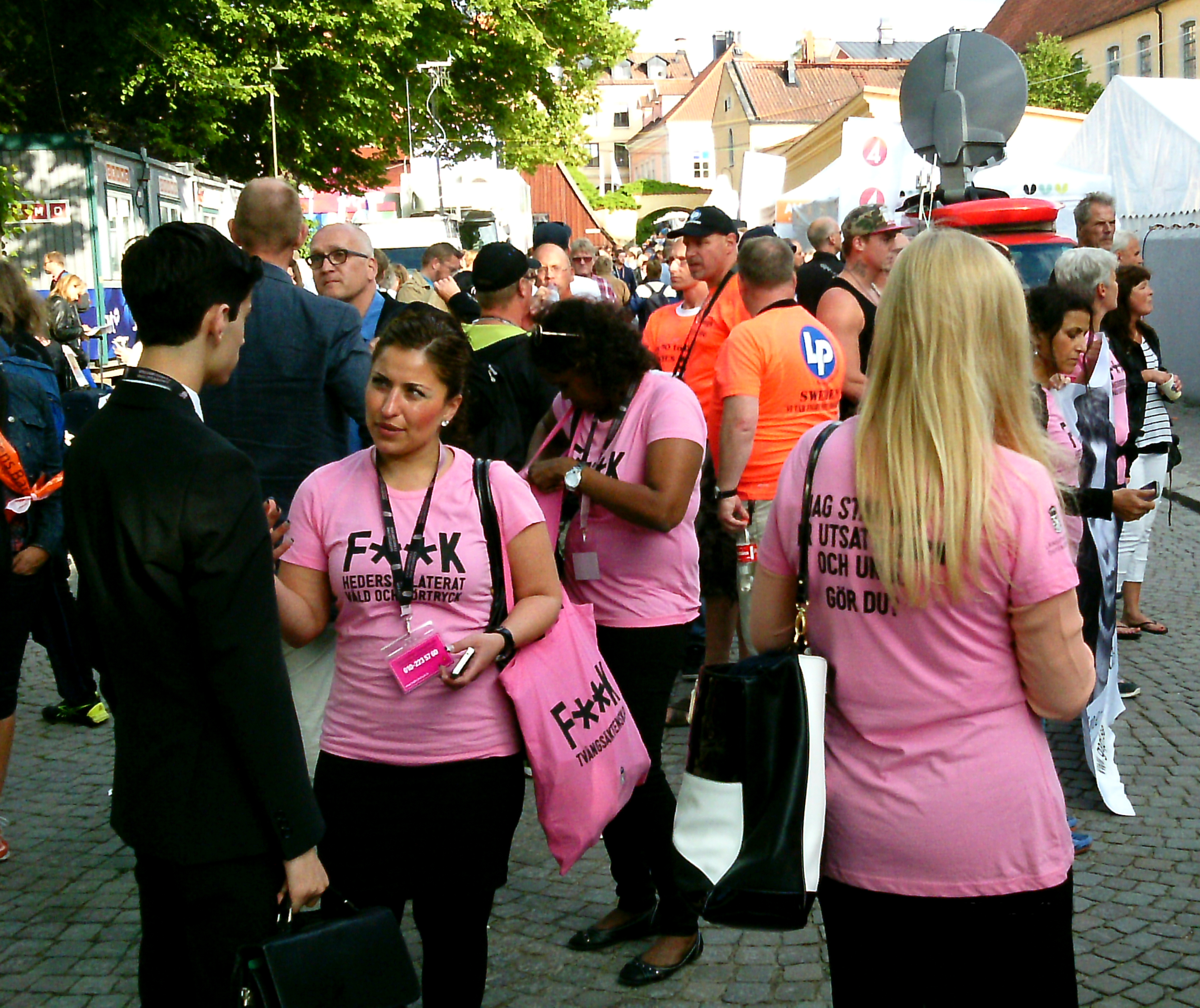
2014 – Activists

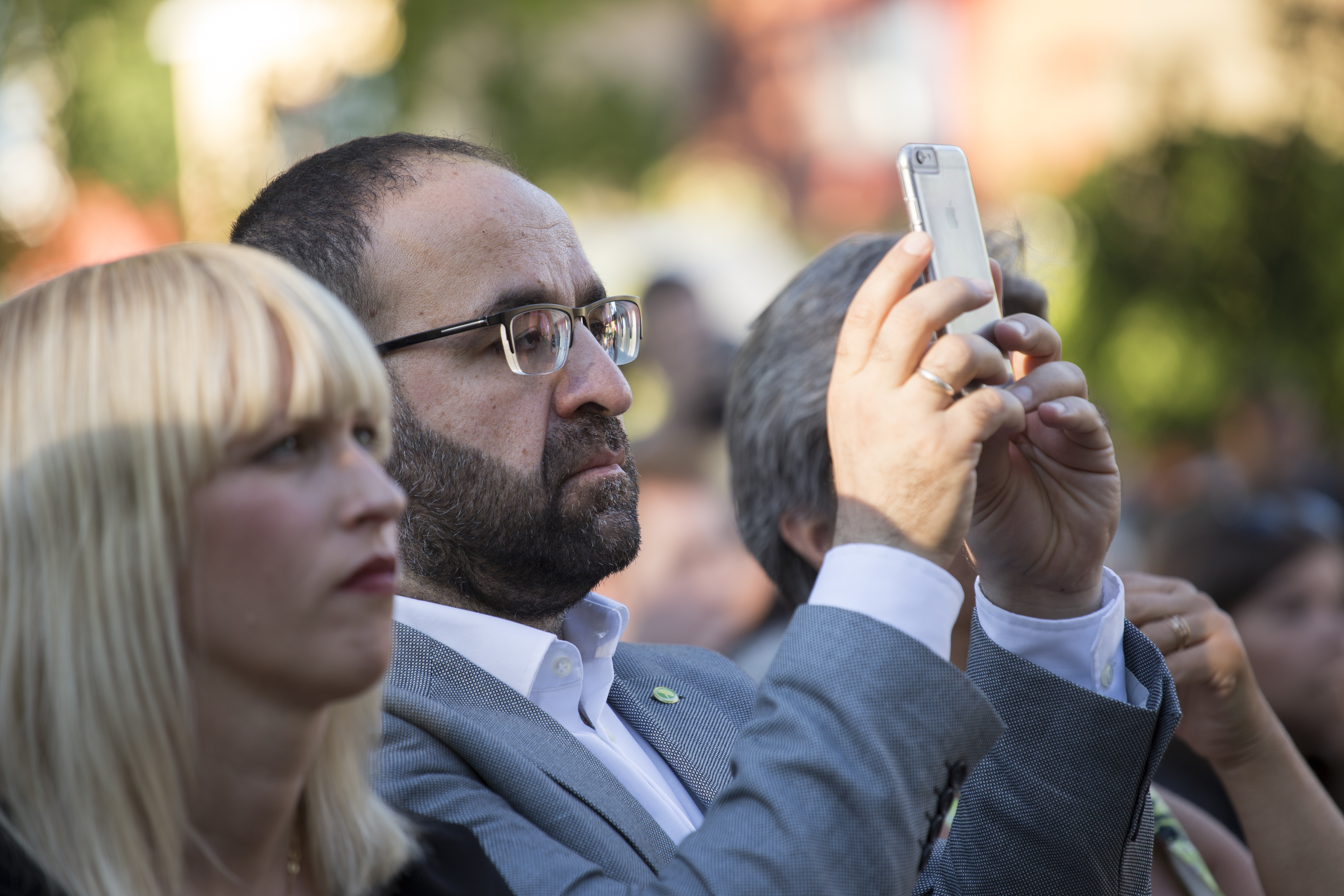
2015 – Mehmet Kaplan

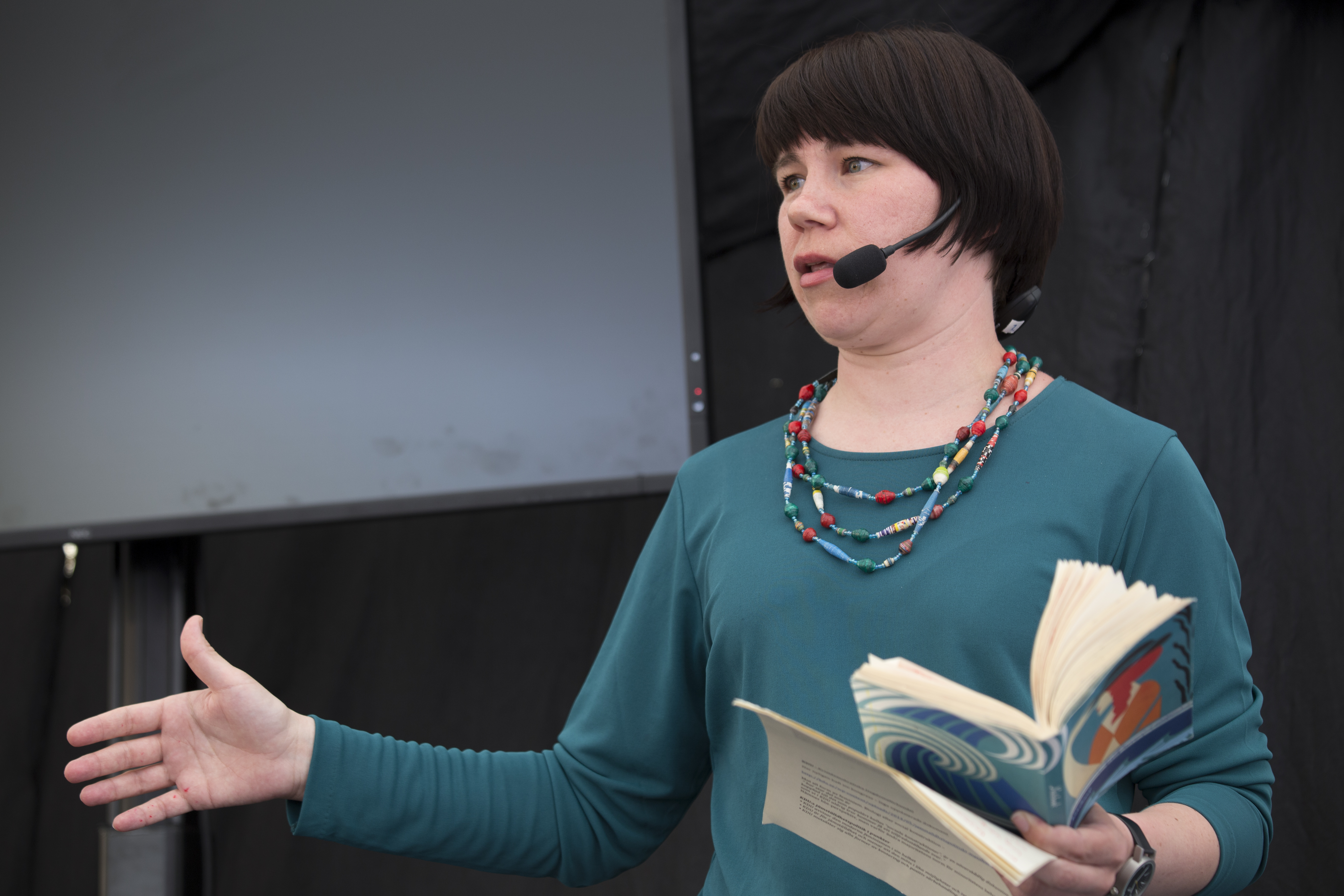
2015 – Kristina Ljungros
