= Wieselgren =

Wieselgren is a surname of Swedish origin. People with that name include:

- Hans Wieselgren (born 1952), Swedish fencer who competed at the 1972 Munich Olympics
- Harald Wieselgren (1835–1906), Swedish librarian and author
- Ing-Marie Wieselgren (1958–2022), Swedish psychiatrist
- Peter Wieselgren (1800–1877), Lutheran priest and leader of the Swedish temperance movement
