= Maria Ferm =

Swedish politician

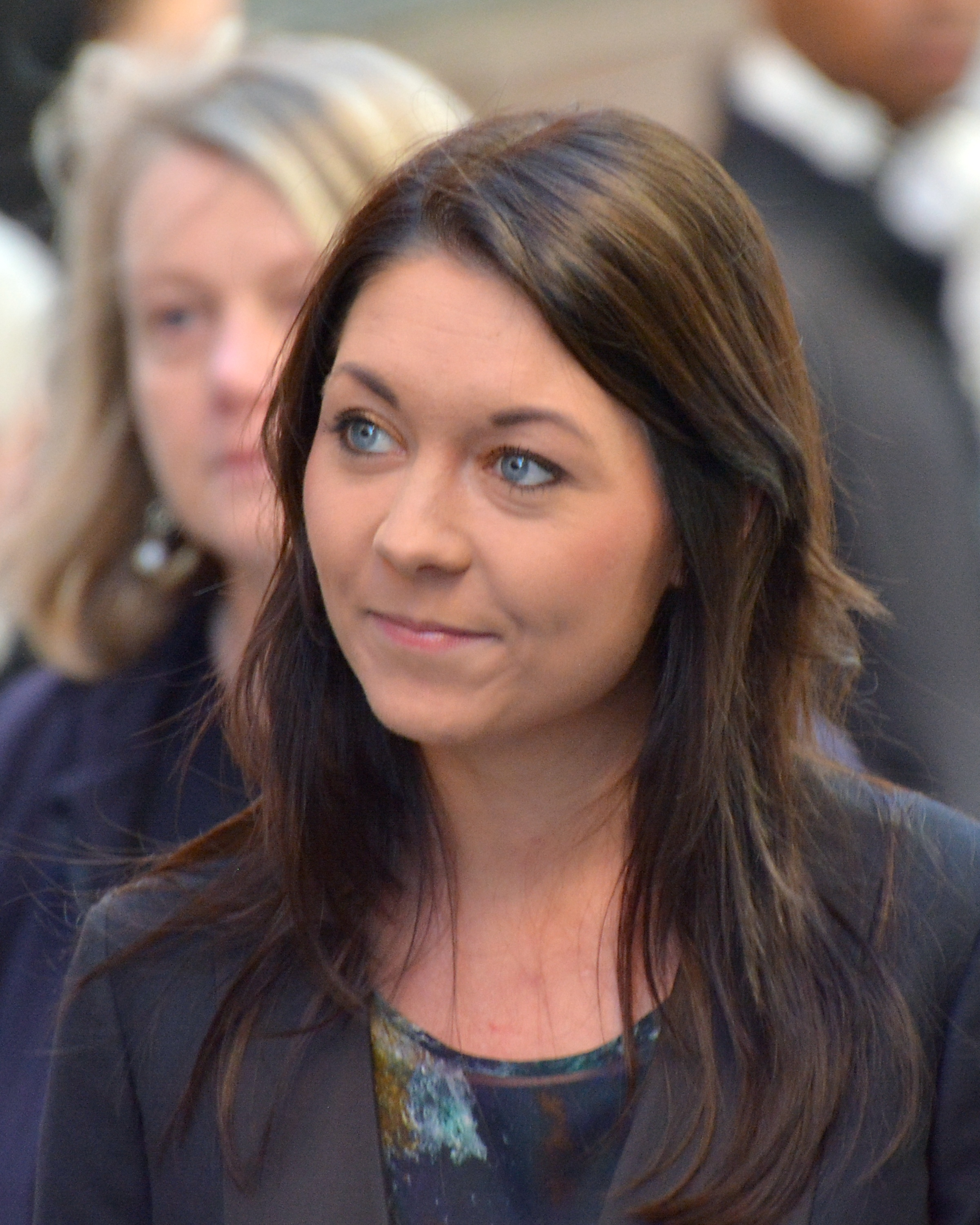
- Portrait of Maria Ferm

Member of the Riksdag
- In office 2010–2022
- Constituency: Stockholm Municipality

Personal details
- Born: 21 August 1985 (age 40) Malmö, Sweden
- Party: Green Party
- Spouse: Gustav Fridolin (m. 2023)

Maria Ferm is a Swedish politician. She served as Member of the Riksdag with the Green Party. After graduating from Malmö University in 2008, she served as spokesperson of the Young Greens until 2011. She served as the Green Party's house leader from 2014 to 2019.

She is married to Green Party politician Gustav Fridolin since July 2023.
