= Åsa Romson =

Swedish politician (born 1972)

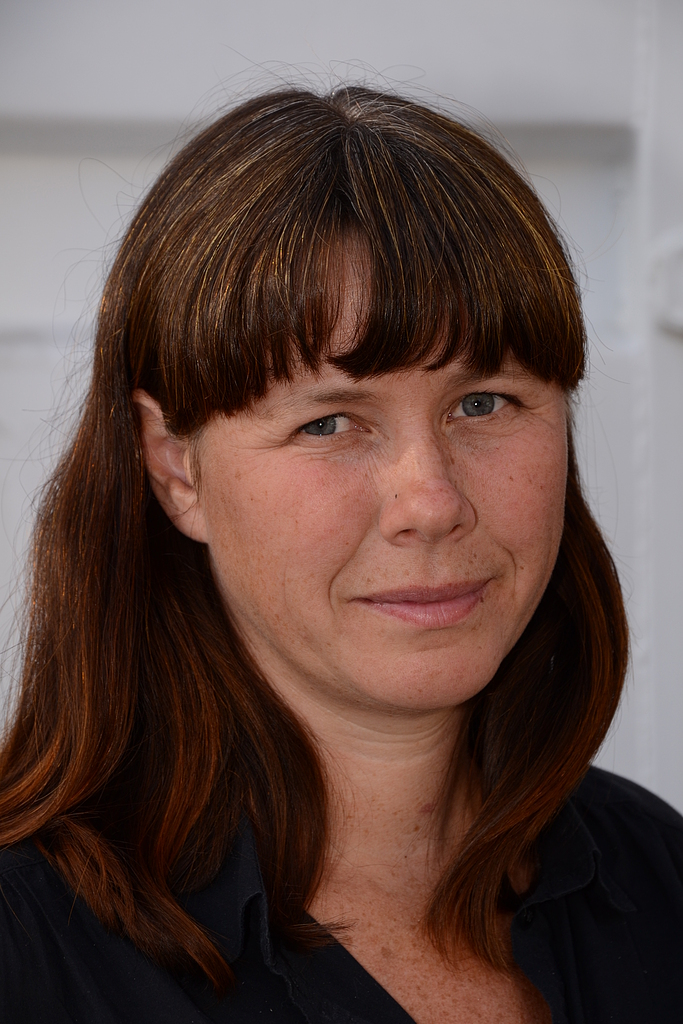

Minister for the Environment
- In office 3 October 2014 – 25 May 2016
- Prime Minister: Stefan Löfven
- Preceded by: Lena Ek
- Succeeded by: Karolina Skog

Deputy Prime Minister of Sweden (honorary title)
- In office 3 October 2014 – 25 May 2016 Serving with Margot Wallström
- Prime Minister: Stefan Löfven
- Preceded by: Jan Björklund
- Succeeded by: Isabella Lövin

Spokesperson of the Green Party
- In office 21 May 2011 – 13 May 2016 Serving with Gustav Fridolin
- Preceded by: Maria Wetterstrand; Peter Eriksson
- Succeeded by: Isabella Lövin; Gustav Fridolin

Member of the Riksdag
- In office 7 June 2016 – 14 July 2017
- In office 18 May 2013 – 2 October 2014
- In office 4 October 2010 – 22 November 2012
- Constituency: Stockholm Municipality

Personal details
- Born: 22 March 1972 (age 54) Salem, Sweden
- Party: Green
- Education: Stockholm University (JD)
- Profession: Politician

Åsa Elisabeth Romson (born 22 March 1972) is a Swedish politician who was the Minister for the Environment and ceremonial Deputy Prime Minister of Sweden in the Swedish Government from 2014 to 2016. She is a member of the Green Party and served as one of its spokespersons along with Gustav Fridolin between 2011 and 2016.

In 2012, Romson completed a doctorate in environmental law at Stockholm University.

== Political career ==
In the late 1990s, she was a member of the Green Party and the Young Greens of Sweden. Between 2002 and 2010, she was a member of the city council in Stockholm. Since the 2010 election she has been a spokesperson for environmental and climate policy. She has been a member of the Swedish parliament since the 2010 election.

On 29 March 2011, she was nominated as one of the candidates to be the Green Party's new spokesperson, together with Gustav Fridolin. They were elected on 21 May 2011.

She started serving as the Minister for the Environment and Deputy Prime Minister of Sweden in the Löfven Cabinet. Romson announced her intention in May 2016 to resign from the Government, following the Green Party's decision not to nominate her for the party leadership for another term.

Party political offices
Preceded by Peter Eriksson; Maria Wetterstrand	Spokesperson of the Green Party; 2011–2016 Alongside: Gustav Fridolin	Succeeded by Gustav Fridolin; Isabella Lövin
Political offices
Preceded by Jan Björklund	Deputy Prime Minister of Sweden (honorary title); 2014–2016 Serving with: Margot Wallström	Succeeded by Isabella Lövin
New office	Minister for the Climate; 2014–2016	Succeeded by Isabella Lövin
Preceded by Lena Ek	Minister for the Environment; 2014–2016	Succeeded by Karolina Skog
