= Zaida Catalán =

Swedish politician (1980–2017)

- Born: 6 October 1980; Stockholm, Sweden
- Died: 12 March 2017 (aged 36); Kasai, Democratic Republic of the Congo

Zaida Maria Catalán (6 October 1980 – 12 March 2017) was a Swedish politician, lawyer, and human rights expert who was a member of the Green Party and leader of the Young Greens of Sweden between 2001 and 2005. She left active party politics in 2010 to pursue international work in peacebuilding and human rights, including roles with the Folke Bernadotte Academy and European Union civilian missions.

As a former politician, she advocated on issues including the environment, animal rights, and human rights (including support of Sweden's sex purchase law; see Prostitution in Sweden). During her time in Swedish politics, she co-authored early political motions advocating for consent-based sexual offence legislation. Sweden later adopted consent-based rape legislation, which entered into force on 1 June 2018. Similar consent-based legal frameworks have since been introduced in multiple European countries.

Catalán worked between 2011 and 2016 in conflict-affected and post-conflict environments through European Union civilian missions, Swedish governmental peace and security institutions, and United Nations-related assignments focused on human rights, gender equality, and the documentation of conflict-related sexual violence. She held field and advisory roles in regions including the Democratic Republic of the Congo, Afghanistan, and the Palestinian territories, where she supported security sector reform, justice sector capacity-building, and the documentation of serious human rights violations. In March 2017, Catalán and her American colleague Michael Sharp were kidnapped and murdered while serving as United Nations experts on a UN-mandated investigative mission in the Democratic Republic of the Congo (DRC).

Subsequent United Nations monitoring and investigative reporting documented indications that the killings may not have been random and may have been preceded by surveillance and coordination involving armed actors and individuals linked to state security structures. These findings contributed to public and investigative discussion regarding whether the UN experts may have been deliberately targeted while carrying out investigative work.

On 29 January 2022, a DRC military court sentenced more than 50 individuals in connection with the murders of Catalán and Sharp. Appeals proceedings have continued, and United Nations monitoring mechanisms and international observers have raised concerns regarding delays, evidentiary handling, and procedural constraints affecting the judicial process.

== Biography ==
=== Early life ===
Zaida Catalán was born in Stockholm but grew up in Högsby in Småland. Her mother was Swedish while her father had come to Sweden as a political refugee from Chile in 1975. She studied law at Stockholm University, obtaining a Master of Law degree. Catalán was fluent in Swedish, English, French and Spanish.

=== Political career ===
With a background as an animal rights activist, Catalán became the leader of the Young Greens of Sweden in 2001. After two years as co-spokesperson alongside Gustav Fridolin and two years alongside Einar Westergaard, she stepped down from the leadership of the Young Greens in 2005. During this period, she was also nominated as one of the top 100 most influential young people in Sweden by the magazine Weekly Business.

Between 2004 and 2010, she worked as a lawyer and legal adviser for the Green Party's parliamentary office in the Parliament of Sweden. In this role, she advised members of parliament on constitutional law, rule of law, corporate and association law, migration, environmental law and gender equality, including policy work related to sexual violence legislation. She contributed to the development of a new political strategy on gender equality, participated in negotiations with the government on sexual violence legislation, supported election campaign strategy development, and helped initiate a national political campaign that contributed to the revision of Swedish rape legislation. She also worked on cross-party policy cooperation on urban development and strategies for social change, drafted policy strategies including proposals related to energy law, coordinated media and public relations work for MPs, organised parliamentary seminars, and participated in parliamentary reference groups related to oversight of secret surveillance.

After the Swedish general election in 2006, she served as a Member of the Stockholm City Council for the Green Party until 2010. During her term, she helped prevent the closure of municipally funded shelters for abused women and successfully negotiated increased municipal funding for women's shelters. During the same period, she also served in several politically appointed governance and oversight roles, including as a member of the Committee on Police Affairs for Stockholm County Council (2007–2010), where she negotiated Green Party priorities in the police budget, including stronger accountability mechanisms and increased police awareness of sexual violence victims. She also served on the board of the municipal housing company Stockholmshem (2006–2010), where she worked on budget and strategic priorities and promoted training for housing staff on gender-based violence awareness.

Catalán also held several leadership and governance roles within civil society connected to her political engagement on gender equality and protection from violence. She served as Vice President of the Board of Terrafem (2007–2009), Sweden's national organisation supporting migrant women exposed to violence, where she oversaw implementation of the organisation's budget and annual work plan and helped increase both membership and public funding. She also served on the board of the National Organisation for Women's and Girls’ Shelters (ROKS) (2008–2010), where she contributed to organisational budgeting and strategy, helped modernise board working methods by incorporating perspectives of migrant women into national materials on gender-based violence, and helped increase funding for shelters supporting girls exposed to sexual violence. In addition, she worked directly with survivors through Terrafem's national helpline and shelter network, providing legal, practical and multilingual support to migrant women exposed to violence.

At the European level, she was a substitute member of the European Parliament between 2009 and 2014. She also stood as a candidate in the 2009 European Parliament elections, where she placed fifth in internal party selection and received 16,300 personal votes in the election, which was not sufficient to secure a seat.

In December 2010, Catalán left her parliamentary legal advisory role to pursue international assignments, including work as an expert on sexual violence and gender within the European Union Police Mission in the Democratic Republic of the Congo (EUPOL RDC).

Between 2011 and 2012, she worked as an expert on gender, human rights and sexual violence within EUPOL RDC, based in eastern DRC. She was responsible for implementing the EU Gender Action Plan in the field, advising and training specialised police units on gender and sexual violence, developing projects to strengthen police capacity to respond to sexual violence and support survivors, and supporting the professional development of female police officers. She also participated in police station audits assessing compliance with international human rights standards and national sexual violence legislation. During this period, she designed and delivered the first project promoting female police officers in North Kivu, trained police units deployed to protect villages affected by mass sexual violence, trained hundreds of Congolese criminal investigation officers on gender, sexual violence and human rights, and managed donor relations and project budgeting in cooperation with international partners.

In October 2012, she worked as a lecturer on gender for the Swedish government's Folke Bernadotte Academy, contributing to the international course Leadership and Gender in Peace Operations. In this capacity, she delivered training and strategic guidance on gender mainstreaming in conflict and peace operation environments.

From 2011 onwards, Catalán worked extensively in international peacebuilding and civilian crisis management, including within European Union civilian missions and through Swedish governmental peace and security structures.Her work focused on gender equality, protection of civilians, and strengthening security and justice sector responses to gender-based violence through training, advising, monitoring and programme implementation in high-risk environments. She served in field and advisory roles in Afghanistan and the Palestinian territories, working with police, prosecutors, judicial authorities and ministries to strengthen institutional responses to human rights violations and gender-based violence. In Afghanistan, she designed and delivered training programmes for police, prosecutors and legal professionals, supported national institutions in developing gender policies and action plans, and contributed to EU monitoring activities. In the Palestinian territories, including work based in Ramallah, she advised mission leadership on gender integration across security and justice programmes, supported national justice and security institutions, helped develop specialised judicial capacity on gender-based violence, trained police officers, and contributed to policy and strategy development in cooperation with international partners including UN Women.

In 2016, Catalán began working in an expert group for the United Nations reporting to the Security Council and directly to the Secretary-General, investigating human rights violations and abuses against civilians in the Democratic Republic of the Congo.

=== Work documenting sexual violence in Kavumu in 2016 ===
During her work in eastern Democratic Republic of the Congo, Catalán was involved in documentation and investigation related to cases of sexual violence against children in the village of Kavumu, South Kivu Province. As part of field-based human rights investigations, she interviewed victims and families and collected testimonial and evidentiary material in line with international documentation standards.

As part of standard human rights documentation practices, Catalán and her team at times used concealed recording equipment to document statements from individuals associated with armed groups. Material gathered through these investigations formed part of the wider evidentiary record used in legal proceedings against sect leader and politician Frédéric Batumike and members of his militia.

Batumike and several associated militia members were later convicted by Congolese courts of crimes including sexual violence against children. Court proceedings and human rights reporting documented cases involving very young victims, including infants. The case has been cited in reporting and academic discussion as part of broader efforts to address impunity for conflict-related sexual violence in eastern Democratic Republic of the Congo.

== Lead-up to the killings ==
Investigative publications describe the lead-up to the killings within the broader political and security crisis affecting the Democratic Republic of the Congo (DRC) during the mid-2010s. These publications situate the events within the escalation of the Kamuina Nsapu insurgency in the Kasai region, which developed amid disputes over customary authority, expanding militia activity, and counter-insurgency operations by Congolese security forces during a period of national political tension linked to delayed elections and contested governance.

Media investigations and United Nations reporting characterised the Kasai crisis as involving mass displacement, allegations of mass graves, and widespread violence involving both militia groups and state security forces.

Contemporary reporting and UN sources indicate that Catalán and Sharp travelled to Kasai as part of UN-mandated investigative work connected to monitoring armed groups, sanctions compliance, and human rights violations. The sources state that the region drew increased international attention following allegations of mass graves, child recruitment, and widespread abuses during clashes between Kamuina Nsapu-affiliated groups and state forces. They describe an initial mission to Kananga in January 2017, during which the experts met political, military, and civil society interlocutors.

Available source material states that during their travel and preparatory meetings, the experts met a range of Congolese political, security, and traditional authority figures. Individuals mentioned include FARDC officer Colonel Jean de Dieu Mambweni Lutete, intelligence officials including Kalev Mutondo and Delphin Kahimbi, political figures including Clément Kanku and Martin Kabuya, and traditional authority representative Jacques Ntumba Kamuina Nsapu.

Some reporting indicates that Colonel Mambweni played a role in facilitating contacts and information flows that contributed to the experts’ decision to undertake their second mission toward Bunkonde. These accounts state that he introduced intermediaries and was involved in recommending local guides and contacts used in preparation for the trip.

Source material further indicates that the experts conducted additional meetings in Kananga between 8 and 11 March 2017 and received information about alleged militia activity, possible training sites, and reported mass graves in areas near Bunkonde. This information reportedly contributed to their decision to travel toward the area on 12 March 2017 to attempt to verify these claims and to meet individuals described as connected to militia groups.

Accounts from investigative and UN-linked sources describe the journey from Kananga toward Bunkonde on 12 March 2017 as leading into territory with active militia presence. They state that the convoy was later stopped following a mechanical incident and subsequently ambushed by armed militia members near the village of Moyo Musuila. According to these sources, the experts and members of their convoy were captured, questioned by militia members, and later taken into nearby bushland where Catalán and Sharp were shot. The sources state that Catalán was decapitated after being shot.

Investigative publications characterise the killings as a planned ambush and suggests that the events leading up to the deaths involved a combination of conflict dynamics, reliance on local intermediaries, and contested information flows.

=== Congolese authorities’ response and relevance to the UN mission ===
The Kamuina Nsapu uprising prompted a large-scale response from Congolese state authorities, including military deployments, police operations, and security-led efforts to reassert control over affected areas of the Kasai region. During 2016 and early 2017, clashes between security forces and militia groups were accompanied by widespread reports of serious human rights violations.

Human rights organisations, UN reporting, and media investigations accused Congolese security forces of using excessive and disproportionate force during counter-insurgency operations, including in incidents involving civilians and suspected militia members.

Congolese authorities initially rejected or disputed many of these allegations, while later announcing investigations into alleged violations by security forces as fighting with militia groups continued.

The escalation of violence and the emergence of allegations of mass graves and civilian killings contributed to increased international scrutiny of the situation in Kasai. In this context, UN expert mechanisms expanded their monitoring focus to include developments in the region.

Reporting and official documentation describe tensions between ongoing security operations and external monitoring efforts. Sources state that the arrival of international investigators occurred during a period in which Congolese authorities were conducting military and security operations against Kamuina Nsapu-affiliated groups while also facing international pressure to investigate alleged abuses.

These conditions formed part of the broader environment in which Catalán and Sharp conducted their fieldwork prior to their final mission in March 2017.

== Kidnapping, murder and subsequent international investigations ==
On 12 March 2017, Catalán and fellow UN expert Michael Sharp, an American national, were kidnapped during a mission near the village of Ngombe in Kasai Province, the Democratic Republic of the Congo, along with Congolese interpreter Betu Tshintela, driver Isaac Kabuayi and two motorbike drivers. On 27 March 2017, Catalán and Sharp were found dead side by side in a shallow grave approximately 80 centimetres (31 in) deep. Sharp had been shot in the head, while Catalán had been shot and decapitated. In April 2017, a video of the killings surfaced publicly.

Prior to the killings, Catalán and Sharp had undertaken multiple UN-mandated investigative deployments to the Kasai region as part of their work examining the Kamuina Nsapu uprising, a conflict involving clashes between government security forces and militia groups. The region was described in some reporting as a limited-access or under-documented conflict zone, sometimes referred to as a “white spot” due to restricted access for independent observers. Their investigations included examining reports, rumours and allegations relating to mass graves and possible unlawful killings of civilians linked to the conflict, including child recruitment, and widespread abuses during clashes between Kamuina Nsapu-affiliated groups and state forces.

On 29 March 2017, Swedish authorities launched an investigation into Catalán's murder; the Minister for Education Gustav Fridolin and the Prime Minister Stefan Löfven both expressed their dismay and sadness over her death and offered their condolences to her family. UN Secretary-General António Guterres also offered his condolences.

In mid-2017, Congolese military authorities initiated judicial proceedings and early convictions involving alleged Kamuina Nsapu militia members. These proceedings were criticised by parts of the international community as premature and insufficiently broad, as investigations into potential wider responsibility were still ongoing. By August 2017, investigations were continuing, with multiple suspects detained and hearings underway, but full accountability had not yet been established. On 26 March 2018, one of the perpetrators, Vincent Manga, was captured by Kananga's military authorities and moved the investigation into a new direction to solve the incident.

Later in 2017, UN Secretary-General António Guterres established a Follow-on Mechanism (FOM) to support Congolese authorities in strengthening the investigation into the killings of the two UN experts and their Congolese companions. The initiative was detailed in a letter to the Security Council dated 31 October 2017. The Mechanism deployed a team led by Canadian prosecutor Robert Petit, composed of technical experts and support staff, who worked alongside Congolese investigators and prosecutors, providing technical, analytical and evidentiary assistance and later monitoring trial and appeal proceedings within the legal framework of MONUSCO.

While many defendants sought to attribute responsibility solely to militia actors, United Nations reporting stated that probative evidence placed before the court supported the prosecution's theory that the killings involved coordinated planning and conspiracy. UN reporting stated that the Appeal Military Prosecutor characterized FARDC Colonel Jean de Dieu Mambweni as a planner and instigator of the murders, alleging that the UN experts’ investigative work risked exposing efforts to conceal mass graves to avoid compromising the State, including concerns described as linked to directives from government authorities. In support of this line of inquiry, recorded phone communications introduced in court were described as indicating that Mambweni expressed concern about poorly concealed mass graves prior to the arrival of the UN experts, whom he allegedly characterized as “real investigators”. Court submissions and investigative material further alleged that Mambweni later denied knowledge of the experts’ presence in the area during proceedings, despite recordings that prosecutors and investigators interpreted as indicating prior awareness. The same sources also reported that Mambweni had met with the UN experts shortly before the killings, a point referenced in evidentiary discussions during legal proceedings and investigative reviews.

UN reporting further described investigative steps and evidentiary material pointing to the possible involvement of additional actors linked to the security and political structures of Central Kasai at the time, including the then acting police commissioner in Kananga (Colonel Kota). According to UN reporting, progress on these lines of inquiry advanced unevenly and later stalled, in part because the UN Follow-on Mechanism ceased active assistance after the Democratic Republic of the Congo lifted its moratorium on executions in March 2024, reducing UN involvement to monitoring proceedings, analysing evidence and reporting.

United Nations reporting on the appeal proceedings also described a pattern in which most defendants denied prior statements and sought to attribute responsibility to other actors, including militia leadership, while the evidence before the court continued to be contested. The reporting also noted structural and procedural constraints affecting the pace of proceedings, including limited hearing time and repeated postponements. UN reporting has further continued to note the unresolved status of four Congolese nationals who accompanied the experts on the day of their abduction and were reported missing and presumed dead.

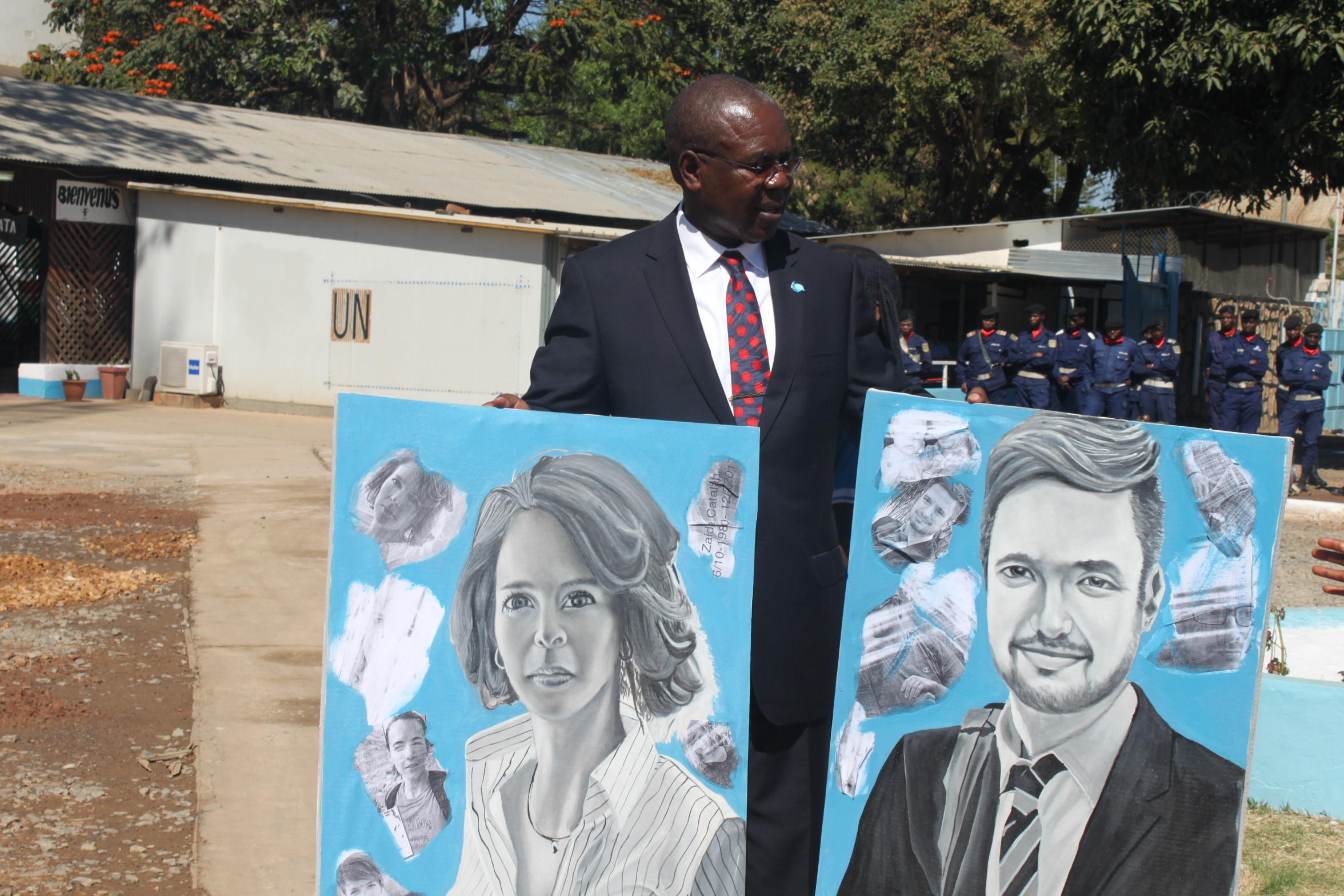
MONUSCO's local chief displays two portraits created by young artists in Lubumbashi depicting the murdered UN experts Zaida Catalán and Michael Sharp.

== Trials and sentences ==
Over 50 individuals were tried for the murders of Zaida Catalán and her American colleague. On 29 January 2022, a military court in the Democratic Republic of the Congo sentenced 51 individuals to various punishments, including death sentences and life imprisonment, with the lowest sentence being 10 years of imprisonment. The sentences are subject to appeal.

Among those sentenced was FARDC Colonel Jean de Dieu Mambweni, who received a 10-year prison term for failing to follow orders and for neglecting to assist persons in danger. The court did not convict him for direct involvement in the murders, citing insufficient evidence of collaboration with the militia believed to have carried out the killings.

Despite these convictions, international observers and human rights organizations have expressed concerns that the proceedings did not fully address allegations of broader coordination or potential involvement by members of the Congolese security apparatus. Reports have highlighted that certain aspects of the investigation, including the roles of higher-ranking officials, remain unresolved.

Appeals proceedings in the case continued after the 2022 verdicts. United Nations monitoring mechanisms and international observers have reported concerns regarding the pace of proceedings, evidentiary handling, and structural constraints affecting the trial process. As of the mid-2020s, proceedings were ongoing.

Ahead of expected appeal verdict developments in the mid-2020s, members of Catalán's family issued public statements calling for full accountability for all actors potentially involved in the killings and for the judicial process to address allegations of coordination beyond militia-level perpetrators. The family emphasised the need for an independent and comprehensive investigation into the circumstances surrounding the murders and the broader chain of responsibility.

Human Rights Watch and other international observers have continued to criticise aspects of the proceedings, including what they described as failures to fully pursue investigative leads relating to potential involvement of members of the Congolese security services and political structures. Subsequent monitoring and reporting also noted concerns relating to procedural fairness, evidentiary handling, delays, and limitations placed on certain investigative lines of inquiry. Some reporting and analysis raised concerns about corruption risks and political pressure affecting aspects of the investigation and trial process, although responsibility and the full chain of command involvement remain contested and subject to ongoing legal proceedings and monitoring.

== UN follow-on investigation and monitoring ==
Following the 2017 murders, United Nations Secretary-General António Guterres established a Follow-on Mechanism (FOM) to support the Congolese national investigation. In a letter to the Security Council dated 31 October 2017, he announced the deployment of a team led by Canadian prosecutor Robert Petit, composed of technical experts and support staff. The team was embedded with Congolese investigators in Kananga to assist in the inquiry into the killings of Catalán, Sharp, and their Congolese colleagues. The FOM operated within the legal framework of the United Nations Organization Stabilization Mission in the Democratic Republic of the Congo (MONUSCO).

Human Rights Watch and other observers later criticized aspects of the Congolese judicial process, stating that the trial failed to fully establish the chain of responsibility for the killings and did not sufficiently pursue lines of inquiry relating to senior officials.

Following the 2022 convictions, the United Nations welcomed progress in the case while reiterating its opposition to the use of the death penalty. The FOM continued to provide limited technical support to Congolese authorities before concluding its assistance in 2025.

As of the mid-2020s, appeals and related legal proceedings were ongoing, with observers continuing to monitor developments in the case.

== Criticism of UN mission and security arrangements ==
The United Nations' approach to the mission involving Catalán and Sharp received criticism, with commentary focusing primarily on institutional and organisational decision-making rather than on the actions of the deployed experts. A New York Times editorial described their dispatch to a violent region without safety equipment as an "astoundingly irresponsible approach by the United Nations to an obviously dangerous and hugely important task."

More broadly, the case highlighted longstanding structural challenges associated with the deployment of unarmed civilian investigative missions, particularly in contexts where armed actors may perceive monitoring as a threat. UN Groups of Experts operate as civilian investigative bodies, and reporting has noted that such deployments can involve significant security risks in volatile environments. Observers noted that Sharp had extensive prior experience working with armed groups and conflict-affected communities.

Investigative reporting has further described the Kamuina Nsapu militia as having been infiltrated by actors linked to Congolese security structures. Recordings reportedly recovered from Catalán's phone from the final meeting between militia members and the UN experts have been cited in reporting and investigations. According to these accounts, intermediaries later described as possible double agents provided assurances regarding security conditions that were later alleged to have been misleading. The recordings reportedly include an elderly Kamuina Nsapu member warning that the area was unsafe and outside militia control, and that this warning was not translated to the UN team. These materials have been cited in reporting as indicating that the experts may have been deliberately misled prior to the ambush in which they were killed, although the sequence of events and responsibility remain debated.

Investigative findings and reporting have suggested that Catalán and Sharp were likely deliberately targeted; if accurate, this would represent a significant escalation, as the deliberate killing of UN expert monitors had not previously been documented at that level in the Democratic Republic of the Congo. At the same time, militia fragmentation, infiltration by actors linked to state security structures, misinformation, and shifting alliances complicate definitive attribution. The case intensified debate regarding how to balance personnel protection with the maintenance of an unarmed civilian posture intended to preserve neutrality and access, prompting calls for strengthened safety protocols and clearer deployment thresholds.

== Social media misinformation following her death ==
In late October 2025, Elon Musk faced criticism after sharing a meme on X (formerly Twitter) that misrepresented the circumstances of Swedish UN expert Zaida Catalán's death. The meme falsely claimed she was killed while advocating for “open borders” and referenced the term “suicidal empathy,” a phrase used in some political debates to criticise humanitarian or migration-related policies. The post also described Catalán primarily as a politician, whereas at the time of her death she was serving as an experienced lawyer and human rights expert on an international United Nations investigative mission. Commentators and Swedish media described the post as a distortion of Catalán's documented work in human rights, rule of law, and gender equality, and criticised it as a politicisation of her murder and a spread of misinformation.

== Memorials ==
On 20 February 2018 the Zaida Catalán Room at the Chilean Embassy in Sweden was inaugurated, and in the same year the Network on Humanitarian Action (NOHA) foundation started a scholarship program in Catalán's memory.

In 2020, the Folke Bernadotte Academy was asked by the Swedish Government to establish a scholarship aimed at supporting the implementation of UN Security Council Resolution (UNSCR) 1325 on women, peace and security. The scholarship was established in Catalán's memory.

== See also ==
- List of kidnappings
- List of solved missing person cases (post-2000)
