= Arvamusfestival =

Festival in Estonia

The Opinion Festival Arvamusfestival
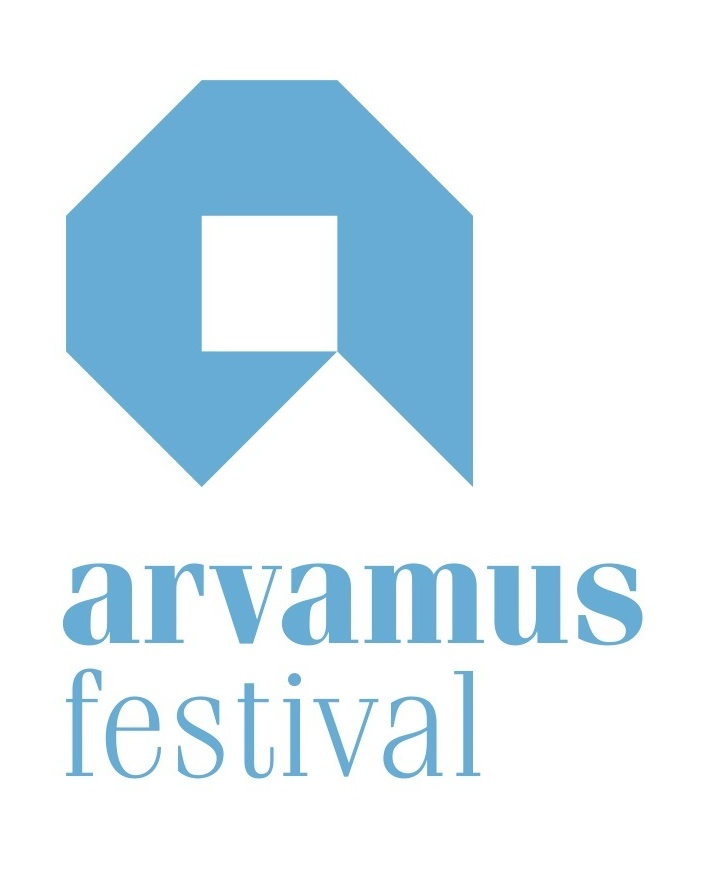

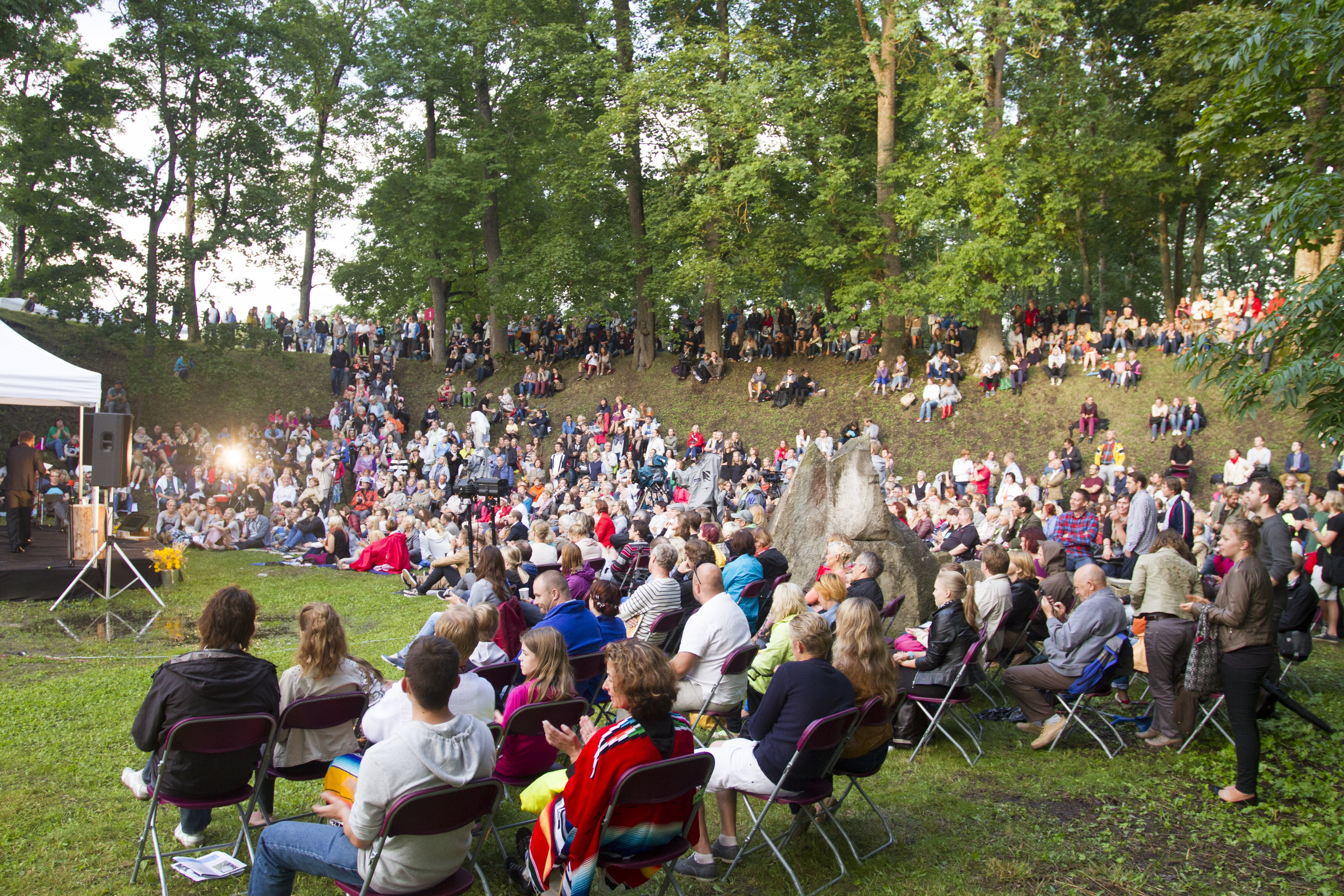
- Attendees at the festival, 2014
- Status: Active
- Frequency: Annually
- Venue: Paide castle
- Locations: Paide, Järva County
- Country: Estonia
- Inaugurated: 15-16 August 2013
- Founder: Kristi Liiva
- Most recent: 8-9 August 2025
- Next event: 7-8 August 2026
- Website: arvamusfestival.ee/en/

Arvamusfestival (transl. The Opinion Festival) is an Estonian public festival whose mission is to enhance debate culture and civic education in the country. It takes place every year in August in Paide, Järva County. The first festival took place in 2013.

Arvamusfestival is inspired by Swedish festival Almedalen Week.

Arvamusfestival is part of the Democracy Festivals Association platform. This platform encompasses eight other discussion festivals.
