= Young Greens (Sweden) =

Swedish political party

Young Greens Grön Ungdom
- Spokesperson: Hanna Lindqvist and Anton Bylin
- Founded: 1986; 40 years ago
- Headquarters: Stockholm
- Membership: 1 300 (2020)
- Ideology: Green politics Eco-socialism; Progressivism
- Mother party: Green Party
- European affiliation: Federation of Young European Greens (FYEG)
- Nordic affiliation: Grön Ungdom i Norden (GUN)
- Website: gronungdom.se

The Young Greens (Swedish: Grön Ungdom, GU) are the youth wing of the Swedish Green Party, founded in 1986.

GU is a part of the Swedish Green party, and membership in GU automatically includes membership in the Green Party for all members not turning 26 that year. Members of GU may, for example, hold elected any elected position within the Green Party where there is no legally binding age limit, with the same principles applying to the Green Students.

== Logo ==
After a membership vote in 2012, the Young Greens changed their logo to the current one, an abstracted green leaf with the name of the organisation. 547 members participated in the vote.

Previously, the organisation had a green footprint as its logo. This was adopted at 2005 annual general meeting in Gothenburg and symbolised the impact humans have on the earth during their lifetime, and the importance of that impact being as easy to wash away as a footprint on a beach is by waves. The symbol had been used for several years before it was adopted unofficially, and it was only adopted at the meeting because another motion had been proposed to adopt a green star to represent the entire green movement.

== Organisation ==
=== Membership ===
As of 31 December 2024, number of members was around 2000.

Members who do not turn 28 or older in the year in question are automatically also members of GU's mother party as well, without having to pay the usual membership fee.

=== Spokespersons ===
Like the Green Party, the Young Greens have two spokespersons, but unlike its mother party both can be female. Rebecka Forsberg has been co-spokesperson since 2022 and Leon Mc Manus since 2023.

- 1996–1999: Maria Wetterstrand and Paulo Silva
- 1999–2001: Sofi Löfstedt and Gustav Fridolin
- 2001–2003: Zaida Catalán and Gustav Fridolin
- 2003–2005: Zaida Catalán and Luka Vestergaard
- 2005–2006: Elina Åberg and Alexander Chamberland
- 2006–2008: Ellinor Scheffer and Alexander Chamberland
- 2008–2011: Maria Ferm and Jakop Dalunde
- 2011–2013: Rebecka Carlsson and Björn Lindgren
- 2013–2016: Magda Rasmusson and Lorentz Tovatt
- 2016–2017: Hanna Lidström and Mårten Roslund
- 2017–2019: Hanna Lidström and Axel Hallberg
- 2019–2022: Aida Badeli and David Ling
- 2022–2023 Aida Badeli and Rebecka Forsberg
- 2023–: Rebecka Forsberg and Leon Mc Manus

== Other details ==
Until 2016 GU did not have a program of its own, and was unique among Swedish political youth organizations in following the program and policies of its mother party.

GU was founded at a conference in Sollentunaholms slott outside Stockholm on 28−30 November 1986.

During the period of 1990−92, GU was a federation of autonomous local units but in 1992, it was again reconstructed as a national organisation.

GU is a member of the Federation of Young European Greens (FYEG), where it is one of the larger member organisations by budget and membership.
