= SuomiAreena =

Annual public debate forum held in Pori, Finland

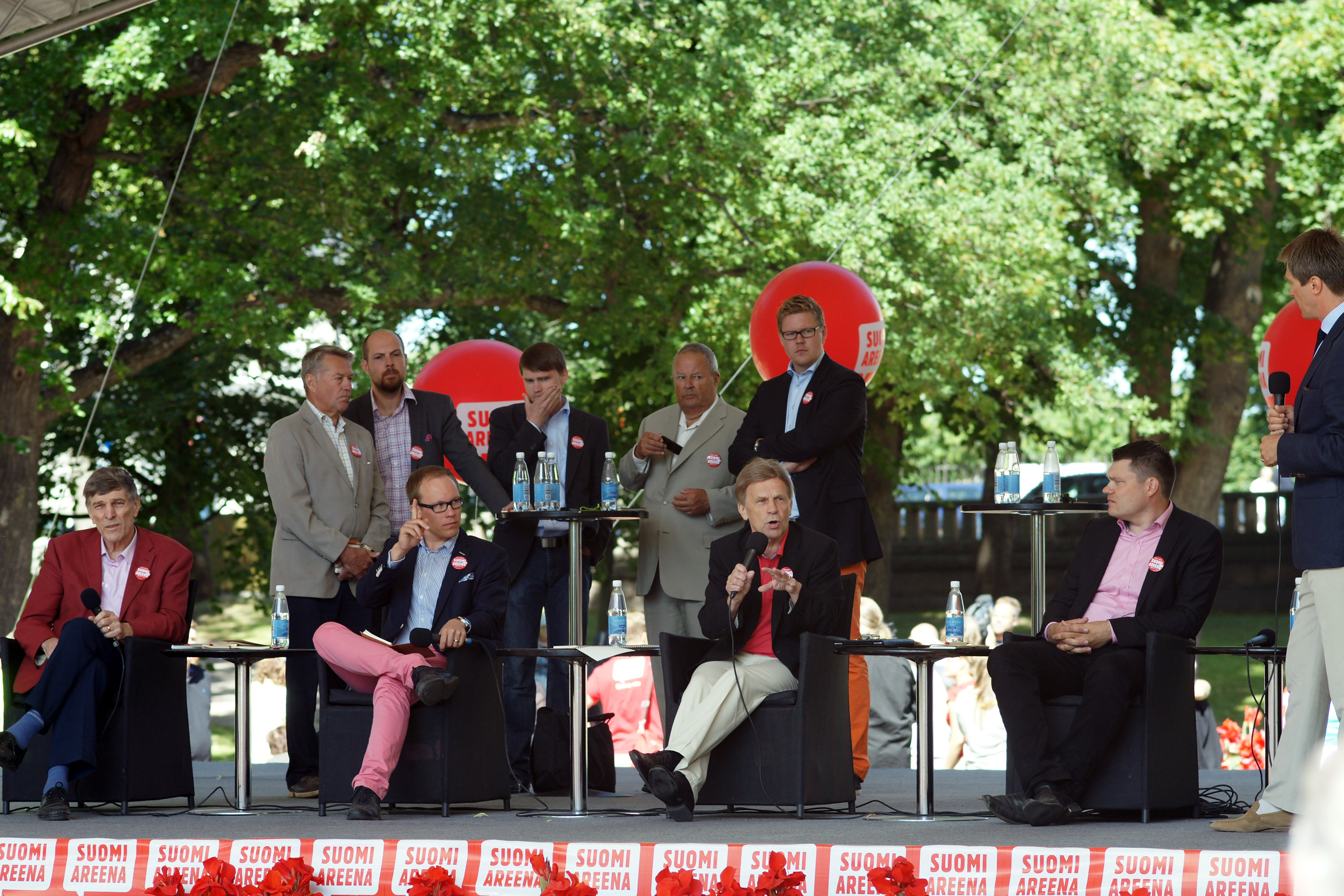
SuomiAreena in 2013

SuomiAreena is an annual public debate forum held in Pori, Finland. It is organized by City of Pori and Finnish TV-channel MTV3. The forum was first arranged in 2006 and it is inspired by Swedish Almedalen Week in Visby.

SuomiAreena is held in July, simultaneously with Pori Jazz which is one of the largest jazz festivals in Europe. 2013 SuomiAreena consists of 125 events and more than 600 debaters and speakers. The events take place in different locations around the city. They are held in cafés, restaurants, parks, theaters, outdoor stages and other suitable places. Topics of the panel discussions are related to various subjects like politics, society, economics, culture and religion.

Along with Finnish activists, politicians and other influential people SuomiAreena has a large number of international participants. Most notable international guests have been the President of the European Commission José Manuel Barroso (2006), president of the European Central Bank Jean-Claude Trichet (2007), Director General of the Al Jazeera Network Wadah Khanfar (2009), Secretary-General of the United Nations Ban Ki-moon (2011) and Nobel Peace Laureate Tawakkol Karman (2012).
