= Almedalen =

Swedish Park

Coordinates: 57°38′26″N 18°17′27″E

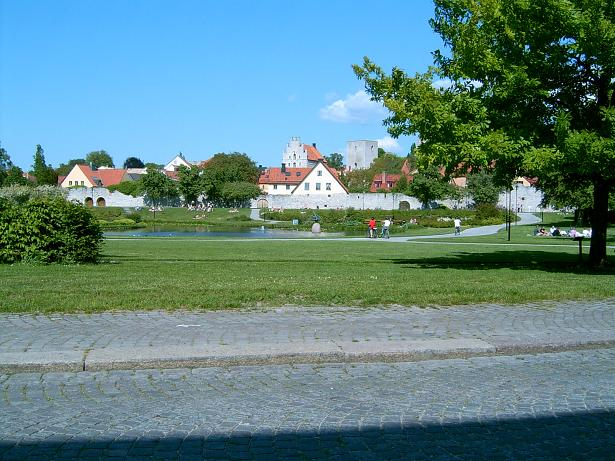
Almedalen

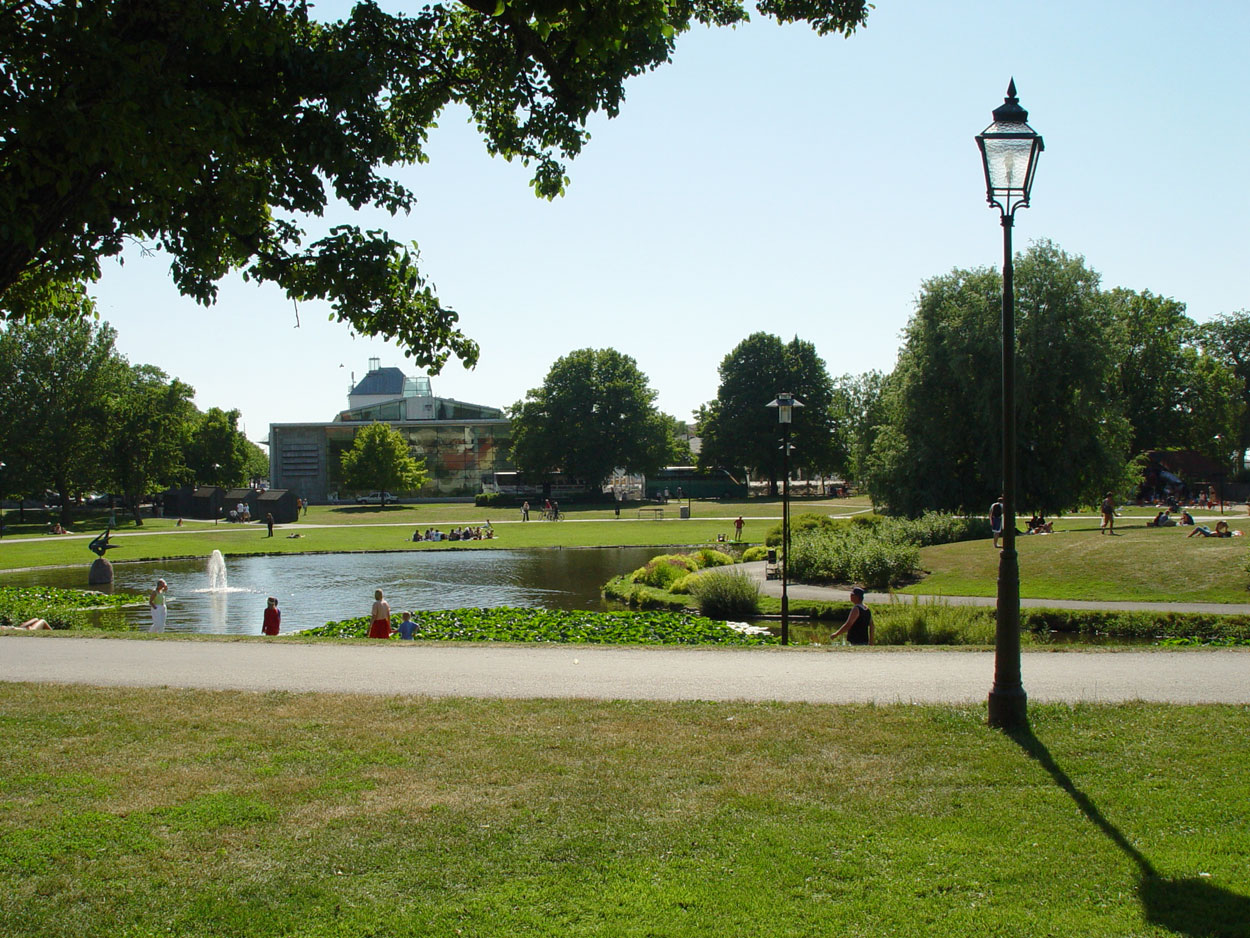
Almedalen

Almedalen (Swedish pronunciation: [ˈalmɛˈdɑːlɛn], lit. 'The Elm Valley') is a park in the Swedish city of Visby on the island of Gotland. It is well known in Sweden as the central site of the annual Almedalen Week.

In medieval times the area, just outside the city walls was the city harbour. Due to the post-glacial rebound, the port over time grew too shallow and a new one had to be constructed further away from the city where the sea is deeper. In the 19th century the area went by the name Gamle Hamn (Old Port). When the area was planted with elms in the 1870s, the name Almedalen was coined.

In Sweden, the name Almedalen is generally associated with the Almedalen Week, an annual event in Visby which is an important meeting place for everyone involved in Swedish politics. During the week, which takes place during the 27th week of every year, representatives from the major political parties in Sweden take turns giving speeches in the park.

The county library of Gotland, the conference centre Visby Strand (opened in April 2007), and Campus Gotland are situated next to the park.
