= Peter Eriksson (Swedish Green Party politician) =

Swedish politician (born 1958)

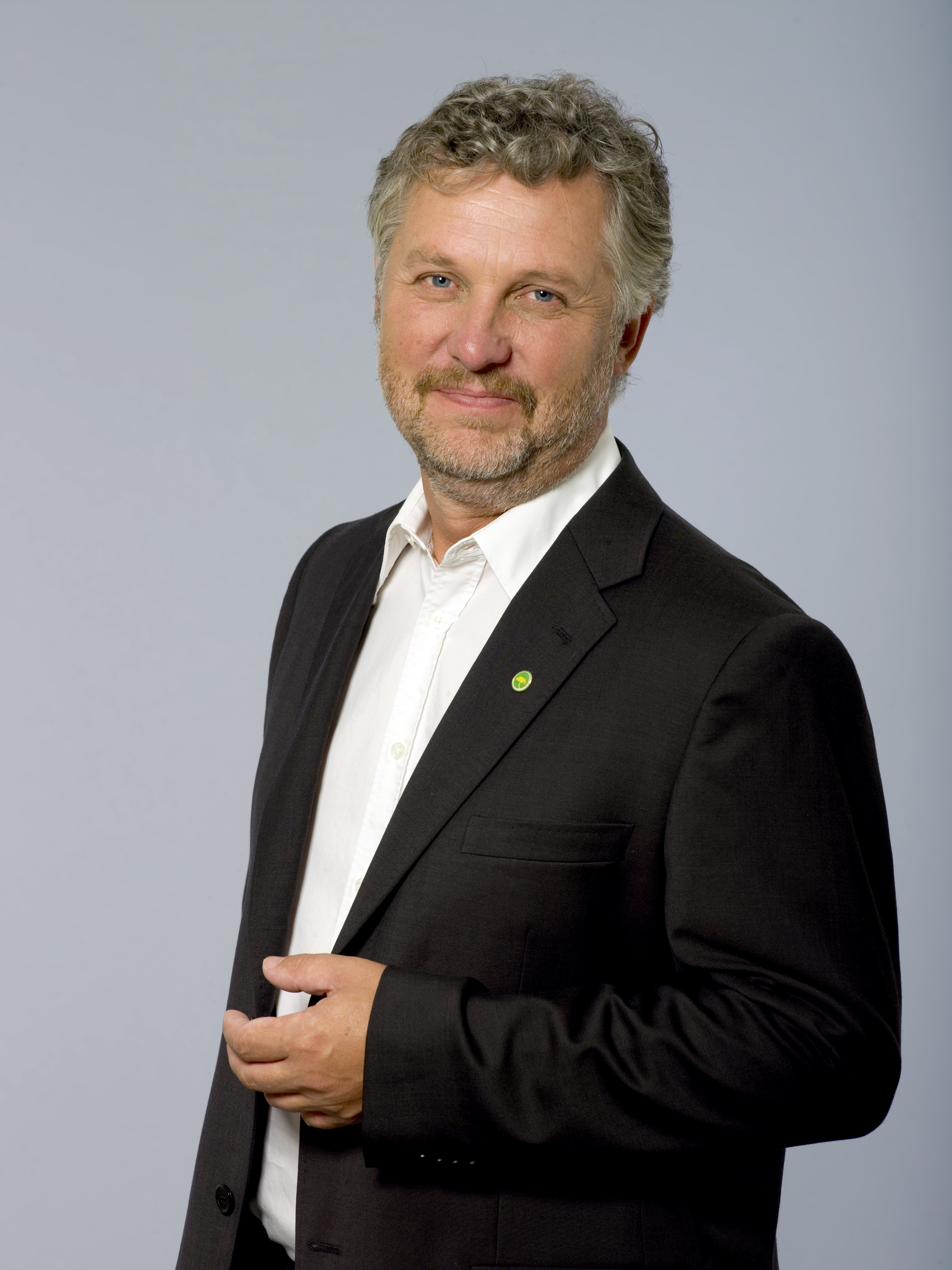
- Peter Eriksson

Minister for International Development Cooperation
- In office 21 January 2019 – 17 December 2020
- Prime Minister: Stefan Löfven
- Preceded by: Isabella Lövin
- Succeeded by: Isabella Lövin (Acting)

Minister for Housing and Digital Development
- In office 25 May 2016 – 21 January 2019
- Prime Minister: Stefan Löfven
- Preceded by: Per Bolund (acting)
- Succeeded by: Per Bolund (Housing); Anders Ygeman (Digitalization)

Member of the European Parliament
- In office 1 July 2014 – 25 May 2016

Member of the Riksdag
- In office 1994–1998
- Constituency: Stockholm County
- In office 2002–2014

Co-spokesperson of the Swedish Green Party
- In office 12 May 2002 – 21 May 2011 Serving with Maria Wetterstrand
- Preceded by: Matz Hammarström; Lotta Hedström
- Succeeded by: Gustav Fridolin; Åsa Romson

Personal details
- Born: 3 August 1958 (age 68) Tranås, Sweden
- Party: Green

Lars-Johan Peter Eriksson (born 3 August 1958) is a Swedish politician who served as Minister for International Development Cooperation from January 2019 to December 2020. He previously served as Minister for Housing and Digital Development from 2016 to 2019 and was a member of Swedish Parliament (1994–1998 and 2002–2014) and European Parliament 2014–2016. Between 2002 and 2011, he was spokesperson for the Green Party.

== Political career ==
=== Early beginnings ===
Eriksson began his political career in Kalix, Norrbotten, where he was Municipal Commissioner from 1999 to 2004. He was also member of the Riksdag 1994–1998 and 2002–2014.

Between 2002 and 2011, Eriksson was one of the two spokespersons (leaders) of the Green Party in Sweden, working alongside Maria Wetterstrand. Under their leadership, the party notably abandoned a demand in its manifesto that calls for Sweden to leave the EU.

=== Member of the European Parliament, 2014–2016 ===
Eriksson was a Member of the European Parliament from July 2014 to May 2016, where he served on the Committee on Industry, Research and Energy. In addition to his committee assignments, he was part of the Parliament's delegations to the EU-Russia Parliamentary Cooperation Committee, the EU-Moldova Parliamentary Association Committee, and the Euronest Parliamentary Assembly. Within the Greens–European Free Alliance, he served as group's vice-chair under the leadership of co-chairs Ska Keller and Philippe Lamberts.

=== Return to Sweden ===
Eriksson served as Minister for Housing and Digital Development from May 2016 to January 2019. In the 2019 cabinet reshuffle, he was appointed Minister for International Development Cooperation. In this capacity, he pledged a total of approximately US$290 million in contributions of Sweden to Global Fund to Fight AIDS, Tuberculosis and Malaria for the 2020–2022 period. On 17 December 2020, Peter Eriksson announced his resignation from the cabinet with immediate effect.

== Other activities ==
- World Bank, Ex-Officio Alternate Member of the Board of Governors (since 2019)

== Honours ==
=== Foreign honours ===
- Italy: Knight Grand Cross of the Order of Merit of the Italian Republic (14 January 2019)

Political offices
Preceded by Isabella Lövin	Minister for International Development Cooperation; 2019–present	Incumbent
