= Lars Ohly =

Swedish politician (born 1957)

Lars Ohly V
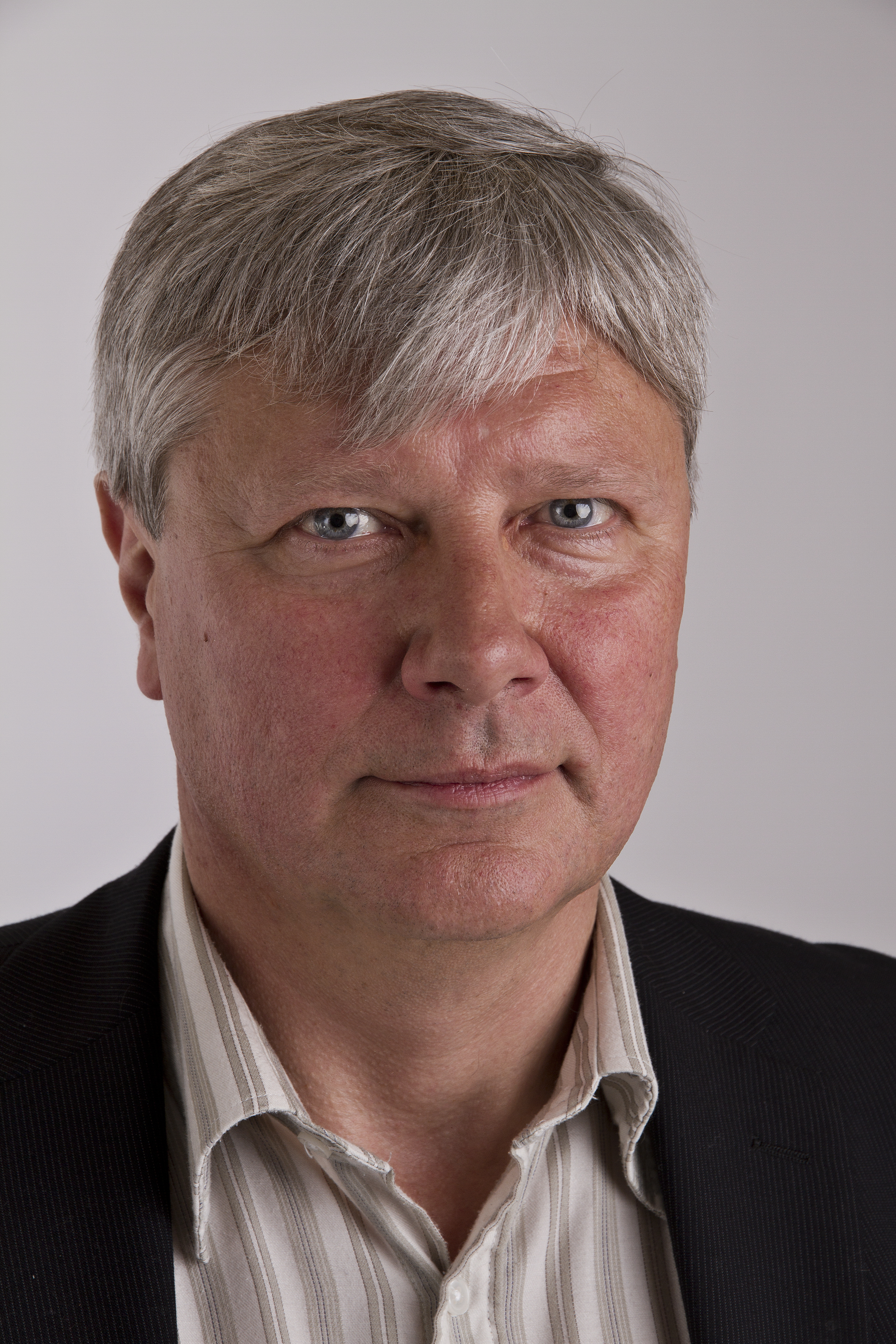
- Lars Ohly

Chairman of the Left Party
- In office 20 February 2004 – 6 January 2012
- Preceded by: Ulla Hoffmann
- Succeeded by: Jonas Sjöstedt

Member of the Swedish Parliament for Stockholm County
- In office 5 October 1998 – 29 September 2014

Personal details
- Born: 13 January 1957 (age 69) Stockholm, Sweden
- Party: Left Party
- Profession: Train attendant
- Website: vansterpartiet.se

Lars-Magnus Harald Christoffer Ohly (Swedish pronunciation: [ˈǒːlʏ]; born 13 January 1957) is a Swedish politician, and the former party chairman of the Swedish Left Party. He was a member of the Swedish parliament from 1998 to 2014.

== Early life and career ==
Lars-Magnus Harald Christoffer Ohly was born on 13 January 1957 in the Spånga suburb of Stockholm. His father, like all his forefathers for six generations, was a priest. He grew up in various places around Stockholm. After finishing his mandatory military service in the Swedish Army in 1977 and gymnasium (secondary) education in 1978, he started working at Statens Järnvägar (Swedish State Railways), where he later became a conductor (Swedish: tågmästare). He is still employed at SJ, but is on leave of absence since 1994.

Ohly became a member of the Liberal Youth of Sweden, the youth wing of the Liberal People's Party, in 1970, but left shortly afterwards, and became a communist. He joined the Communist Youth in 1978, and the Left Party in 1979. He became a member of board of the Communist Youth in 1980, was elected as a substitute of the party board in 1987, and became a full member of the party board in 1990. From 1994 to 2000, he was party secretary, and in 2004, he was elected party chairman. He has been a Member of Parliament since 1998.

Lars Ohly was in 2008 nominated for the award Kurd friend of the year (Swedish: Årets kurdvän 2008). Årets kurdvän is one of the awards presented annually by the Kurdish gala jury that celebrates the active and successful Kurds and friends of Kurds in Sweden.

In August 2011, Ohly announced his resignation. He was elected party chairman on 20 February 2004, succeeding Ulla Hoffmann.

In November 2017, Ohly was banned from attending Left Party events, including the party congress, after allegations of sexual harassment towards women. He left the party in January 2018.

== Controversies ==
=== Nacka Skoglund ===
During his first weeks as party chairman, Ohly claimed in an interview to once have, as a boy, played football against Swedish football legend Nacka Skoglund in a friendly match. The newspaper Dagens Nyheter later revealed that this claim was most likely fictitious. When confronted about this, Ohly claimed it to be an indeliberate error on his part.

=== Communism ===
Lars Ohly used to be an outspoken communist. On 5 October 2005, Uppdrag granskning in Sveriges Television (the Swedish public service television) aired a programme about Lars Ohly's background and views on democracy. In the programme, Ohly was accused of trying to rewrite his own history and of hiding his past. Several quotes by Ohly were found where he defended the political systems of the Eastern bloc. Several prominent party members, among them former party leader Lars Werner, also testified about Ohly's views. It was also found that, in 2000, Ohly had reworded a letter of apology to the "Kiruna-Swedes" - victims of harassment from the Left Party after their return home from Soviet custody - with a number of critical references to Joseph Stalin being removed. The programme also showed that Ohly branded himself as a Leninist as late as 1999.

Following this controversy, the leaders of all the other parliamentary parties have urged Ohly to drop his adherence to communism. On 30 October 2005, Ohly declared on Swedish TV that he would stop labeling himself a communist. But he stressed at the same time that he would stay faithful to the ideals of communism and always would keep fighting for a "classless society".

=== Swedish-Cuban Association ===
During the controversy regarding Ohly's views on communism and his definition of socialism and socialist leadership, Ohly's membership in the Swedish-Cuban Association became known. The Swedish-Cuban Association supported the government of Fidel Castro in Cuba and does not want to label the country as a dictatorship. Ohly then released a statement that he considers Cuba to be a dictatorship and that he is critical of the lack of political freedom in Cuba, a statement which in response was criticized by the chairman of the Swedish-Cuban Association. In September 2005, Ohly declared that he had left the organisation.

=== Middle finger during a live debate ===
During a live debate on Swedish TV4 on 18 September 2006, the day after the Swedish general election, Ohly caused some controversy when he showed the middle finger to the right-wing commentator Marie Söderqvist for calling his leadership style typical of a communist. Ohly later apologized and said that he experienced a "temporary blackout".

=== Choosing private welfare ===
Ohly is strongly opposed to letting privately owned companies operate in industries traditionally controlled by the Swedish state, for instance education and healthcare. However, both his children go to private schools. Ohly says his children made their choices based on what was best for them, independent of his views on the matter. In 2010, he chose to have his meniscus surgery at the private hospital Sophiahemmet. A fan of leasehold estates over condominiums, Ohly himself made a considerable profit from a four-room condominium in the Stockholm City Centre which he bought in 2006 and sold in 2010.

=== Reacting to the fall of Communism ===
Ohly is often cited to have said he cried tears of sadness when learning of the tearing down of the Berlin Wall. In September 2010, he claimed this a false quote political opponents and op-ed writers (primarily Peter Wolodarski, political editor at Dagens Nyheter) keep attributing to him. When reporter Janne Josefsson of Uppdrag Granskning confronted him with an interview clip from 2004 where the statement was uttered, Ohly refused to watch it. Instead, he claimed to have been happy about the events at the time, mentioning that his best friend had sent him a joyous message from Prague in 1989 when the city was being liberated. He initially claimed to have received an SMS message from his friend, which was impossible, since the world's first text message was sent in 1992. He later claimed that he actually spoke to his friend by phone.

Party political offices
Preceded by Maggi Mikaelsson	Party secretary of the Left Party; 1994–2000	Succeeded by Pernilla Zethraeus
Preceded by Ulla Hoffmann	Party chairman of the Left Party; 2004–2012	Succeeded by Jonas Sjöstedt
