= Gustav Fridolin =

Swedish politician (born 1983)

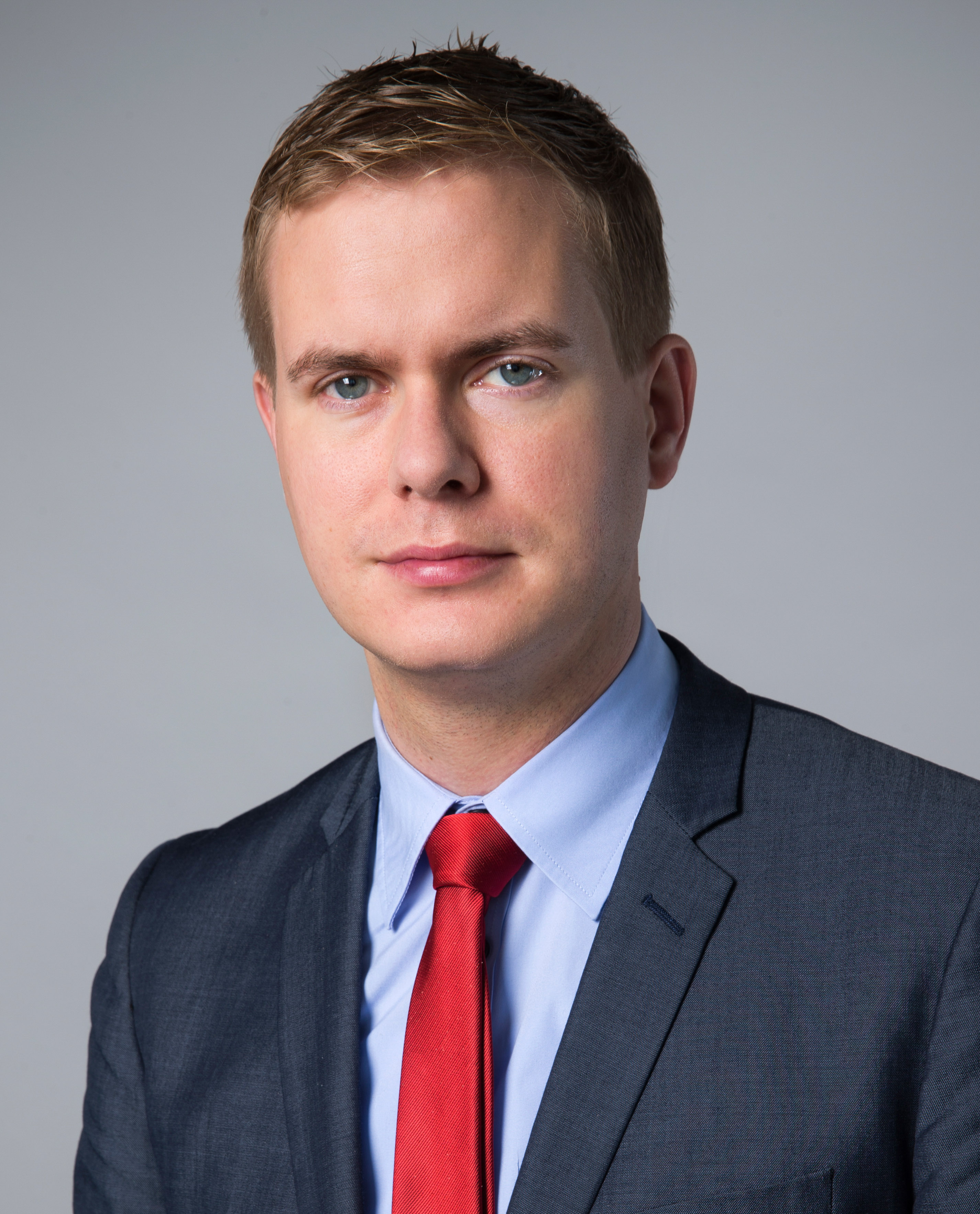
- Fridolin in 2014

Minister for Education
- In office 3 October 2014 – 21 January 2019
- Monarch: Carl XVI Gustaf
- Prime Minister: Stefan Löfven
- Preceded by: Jan Björklund
- Succeeded by: Anna Ekström

Spokesperson of the Green Party
- In office 21 May 2011 – 4 May 2019 Serving with Åsa Romson (until 2016); Isabella Lövin (from 2016)
- Preceded by: Maria Wetterstrand; Peter Eriksson
- Succeeded by: Per Bolund

Member of the Riksdag
- In office 4 September 2010 – 30 September 2019
- Constituency: Skåne County North and East (2010—2018); Stockholm County (2018—2019)
- In office 30 September 2002 – 2 October 2006
- Constituency: Stockholm Municipality

Personal details
- Born: Per Gustav Edvard Fridolin; 10 May 1983 (age 43) Kristianstad, Sweden
- Party: Green
- Spouse(s): Jennie Fridolin (m. 2007; div. 2019) Maria Ferm (m. 2023)
- Children: 2
- Profession: Journalist, Teacher

Per Gustav Edvard Fridolin (born 10 May 1983) is a Swedish journalist, author, teacher and former politician who served as Minister for Education from 2014 to 2019 and as one of two spokespersons of the Green Party from 2011 to 2019.

He was a Member of the Swedish Parliament from 2002 to 2006, representing Stockholm Municipality, and was the parliament's youngest member during that time. Out of politics from 2006 to 2010, he authored two books and worked as an investigation journalist for TV4's Kalla fakta. He returned to the Swedish Parliament in the 2010 general election, and represented Skåne County North and East from 2010 to 2018 and Stockholm County from 2018 until his resignation in September 2019.

He was elected joint spokesperson for the Green Party in 2011, serving with Åsa Romson from 2011 to 2016 and then with Isabella Lövin from 2016 to 2019. When the Green Party entered the cabinet of Stefan Löfven in 2014, the Green Partys first–time ever government participating, he was appointed Minister for Education. As Minister for Education, he appointed the 2015 School Commission, took actions to safe-guard necessary knowledge in reading, writing and mathematics and introduced a programme (Lärarlönelyftet) designed to increase teacher's salary. He stepped down as Minister for Education in January 2019 and as Green Party spokesperson in May 2019.

As of March 2020, he worked as a teacher at the Stockholm City Mission Folk high school.

== Biography ==
Fridolin was born on 10 May 1983 in Önnestad, Kristianstad Municipality, Skåne County, Sweden and grew up in Vittsjö, Hässleholm Municipality, also in Skåne, Sweden. He joined the Green Party in 1994 and served as one of two spokespersons of the Young Greens of Sweden between 1999 and 2003.

Fridolin first served as a member of the Swedish parliament between 2002 and 2006, representing the Stockholm Municipality constituency. Aged nineteen at the time, he was the youngest MP in Swedish history until 2010, when Anton Abele, a Moderate, set a new record. During his first term in parliament he served as a member of the Committee on the Constitution. Fridolin also served as a member of the board of the Green Party between 2004 and 2006, and was one of his party's representatives in the negotiations with the Social Democratic government and the Left Party.

In 2005 Fridolin announced that he would not be up for re-election as an MP in the 2006 election.

Fridolin again ran as a candidate for parliament in the 2010 election and was elected, representing the Skåne County North and East constituency. He is a member of the Committee on European Union Affairs in the parliament and a deputy member of the Committee on Foreign Affairs, the Committee on Civil Affairs and the Committee on Industry and Trade.

Fridolin has written three books, all on politics. The first, titled Från Vittsjö till världen - om global apartheid och alla vi som vill någon annanstans (From Vittsjö to the world - about global apartheid and every one of us that want to go somewhere), was released in 2006. His second book, titled Blåsta, was released in 2009, and his third book, Maskiner och människor - en skrift om arbete och framtidstro (Machines and men - writings on labour and belief in the future) was released in 2011. Machines and men was cowritten with Ulf Bodach Söderström and lays out a possible policy for an environmentally friendly industry.

Gustav Fridolin married Jennie Fridolin 2007; they have two children. They divorced in 2019. He is married to Green Party politician Maria Ferm since July 2023.

His political idols, aside from proponents of Green politics, include Liberal Prime Minister Karl Staaff of the early 20th century which he praised in a January 2011 article, espousing centrist and social liberal views.

In 2014 he became the Minister for Education in the Löfven Cabinet, a position which he served until 2019 when he was replaced by Anna Ekström of the Social Democrats.

Party political offices
| Preceded by Maria Wetterstrand; Paulo Silva | Spokesperson of Young Greens Serving with: Sofi Löfstedt 1999–2001; Zaida Catalán 2001–2003; 1999–2003 | Succeeded by Zaida Catalán; Luka Einar Vestergaard |
| Preceded by Peter Eriksson; Maria Wetterstrand | Spokesperson of the Green Party Serving with: Åsa Romson 2011–2016; Isabella Lövin 2016–2019; 2011–2019 | Succeeded by Isabella Lövin; Per Bolund |
Government offices
| Preceded by Jan Björklund | Minister for Education; 2014–2019 | Succeeded by Anna Ekström |
