= Eva Goës =

Swedish politician (born 1947)

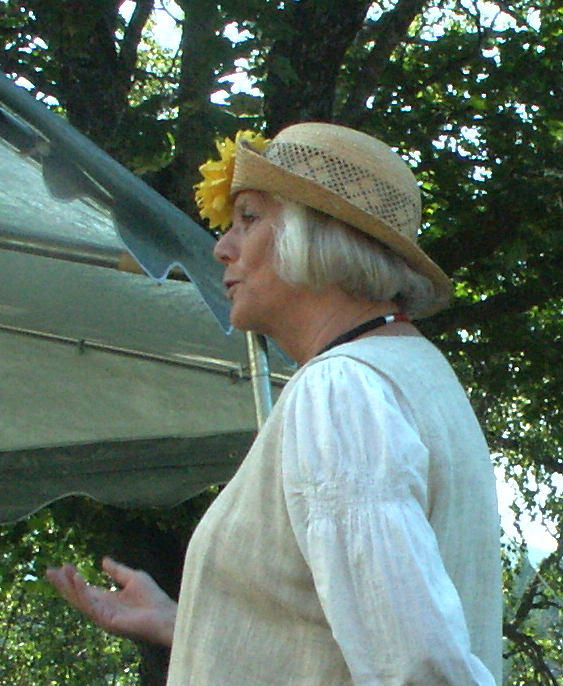
- Goës in 2011

Member of the Riksdag
- In office 1988–1991
- Monarch: Carl XVI Gustaf
- Constituency: Stockholm Municipality

Member of the Riksdag
- In office 1994–1998
- Monarch: Carl XVI Gustaf
- Constituency: Stockholm Municipality

Personal details
- Born: 4 July 1947 (age 78) Umeå, Sweden
- Party: Green Party

Eva Goës (born 4 July 1947) is a Swedish politician and a member of the Green Party.

She was a member of the Riksdag between 1988-1991 and 1994-1998 representing Stockholm Municipality and served as a member of the Education (1988-1991) and the Commerce (1994-1998) committees.

Goës was a member of the city council of Härnösand between 1998 and 2010. She was a member of the county council of Västernorrland from 1998 to 2006. She was voted spokesperson of the Green Party in 1986 at the party congress in Mölndal and was reelected in 1987 by the party congress in Karlskoga. The Green party became the first new party after 70 years in the Swedish Parliament in 1988 when she was the spokesperson.

She was on the Miljöpartiet ballot for the European Parliament election of 2004.

From 2001 to 2012 she was also the chairwoman of Green Forum.

Today she is a member of Global Greens Coordination, elected from EGP, the European Green Party.
