= Johan Lönnroth =

Swedish politician and economist

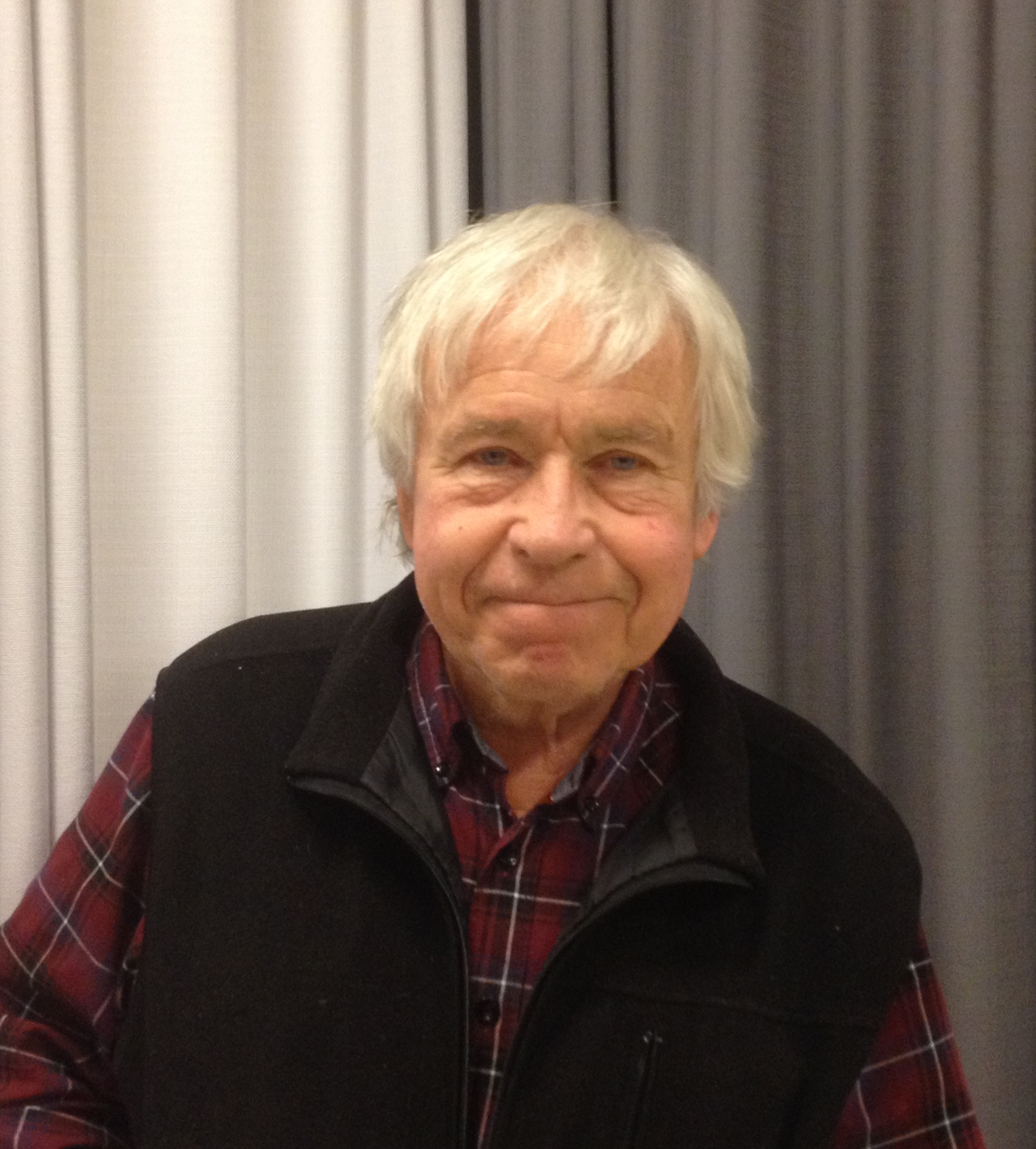
Johan Lönnroth, 2017 (IMG 1095)

Johan Magnus Lönnroth (born 25 December 1937, Gothenburg), is a Swedish left-wing politician and an economist. He has also been a Member of parliament for Vänsterpartiet (the Swedish Left Party) from 1991 to 2003. He is currently working part-time at the University of Gothenburg.

== Bibliography ==
=== Swedish ===
- Marxism som matematisk ekonomi: en kritik av några moderna Marxtolkningar, 1977
- Minervas uggla: om ekonomerna som maktens predikanter, 1985
- Politisk ekonomi: svenska och internationella tanketraditioner, 1989
- Ekonomi för alla, 1991
- Schamanerna: om ekonomi som förgylld vardag, 1993
- Den tredje vänstern, 1997
- Gunnar Westin Silverstolpe: folkbildare, poet och naivistisk nationalekonom, 2003
- Göteborgsskolan: praktisk, friakademisk, historisk, folkbildande, social, 2006
- Den tredje vänstern (new revised edition), 2009
- Hallonöarna, 2010
- Albin Ström och det frihetliga spåret i svensk arbetarrörelse, 2014
