= Ulla Hoffmann =

Swedish politician (born 1942)

member of the Swedish Riksdag
- In office 1994–2006

Acting Leader of the Left Party
- In office 7 February 2003 – 20 February 2004
- Preceded by: Gudrun Schyman
- Succeeded by: Lars Ohly

Personal details
- Party: Left Party

Ulla Hoffmann (born 31 March 1942) is a Swedish Left Party (Swedish: Vänsterpartiet) politician. Hoffmann was interim party leader for a short while in 2003 following the resignation of party leader Gudrun Schyman. Gudrun Schyman was forced to resign due to tax irregularities. She was a member of the Riksdag from 1994 to 2006.

Preceded by Gudrun Schyman	Leader of the Swedish Left Party; 2003	Succeeded by Lars Ohly
