= Maria Wetterstrand =

Swedish politician (born 1973)

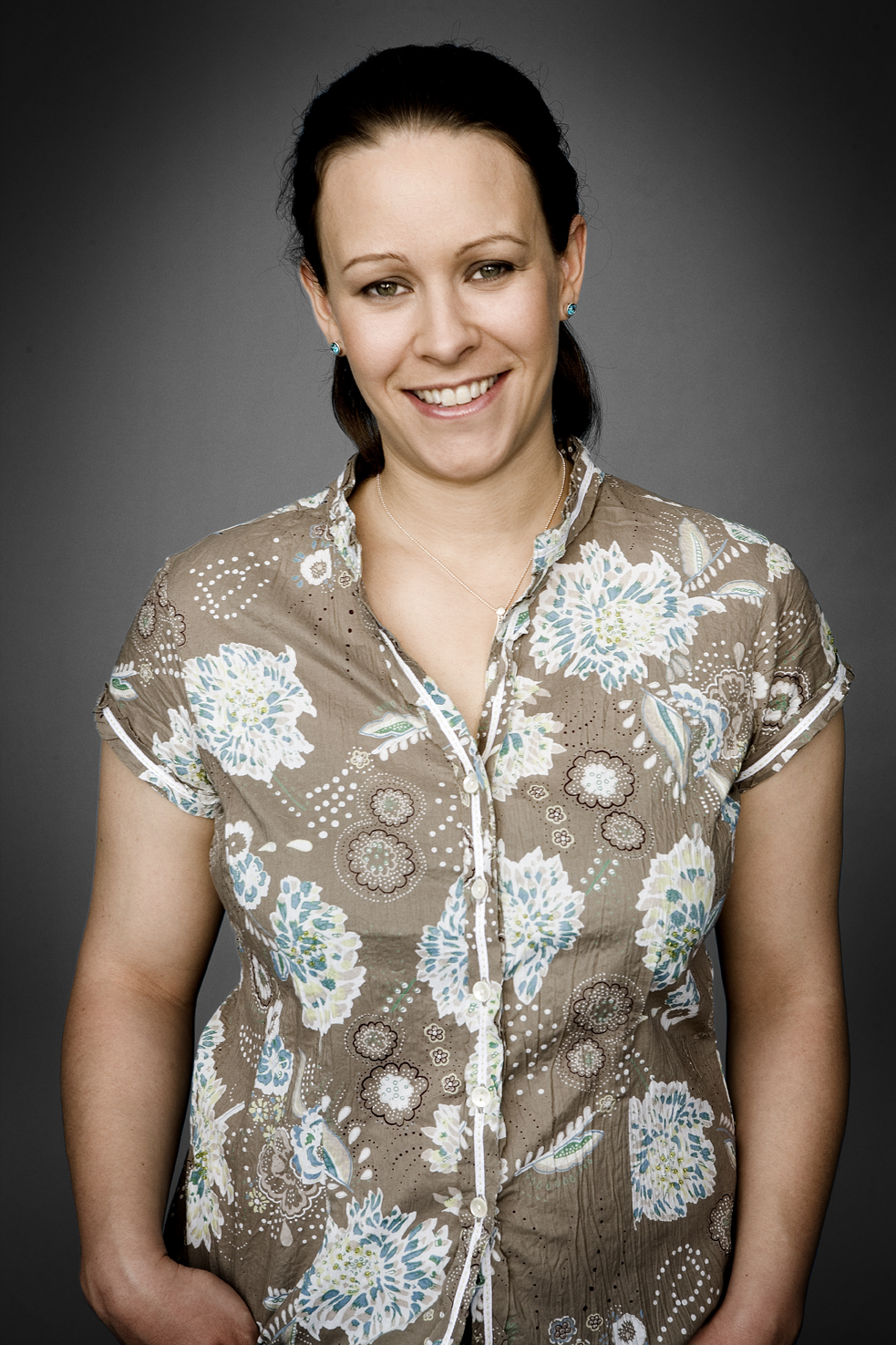

Member of the Swedish Parliament for Stockholm County
- In office 2001–2011

Spokesperson of the Green
- In office 12 May 2002 – 21 May 2011 Serving with Peter Eriksson
- Preceded by: Lotta Hedström; Matz Hammarström
- Succeeded by: Åsa Romson; Gustav Fridolin

Personal details
- Born: 2 October 1973 (age 53) Eskilstuna, Sweden
- Party: Green Party
- Spouse: Ville Niinistö (m. 2004; div. 2012)
- Children: 2
- Education: University of Gothenburg

Maria Wetterstrand (born 2 October 1973) is a Swedish politician. She was one of the spokespersons of the Green Party alongside Peter Eriksson between 2002 and 2011. Between 2001 and 2011 she was a member of the Riksdag.

She was born on 2 October 1973 in Eskilstuna.

Wetterstrand has a master's degree in biology from the University of Gothenburg.

Wetterstrand was married to Ville Niinistö, a Finnish politician representing the Green League, between 2004 and 2012. They have two children: a son born in October 2004 and a daughter born 2007.
