= Lotta Hedström =

Swedish politician (born 1955)

Member of Parliament (Sweden)

Personal details
- Born: 13 September 1955 (age 70) Stockholm, Sweden
- Party: Green Party (Sweden)

Charlotta Hedström, earlier Nilsson Hedström, (born 13 September 1955) is a Swedish Green Party politician. She was a member of the Riksdag 2002–06. During her time as a spokesperson, her name was Lotta Nilsson Hedström.
