= 2014 Swedish government crisis =

Political crisis following the 2014 Swedish general election

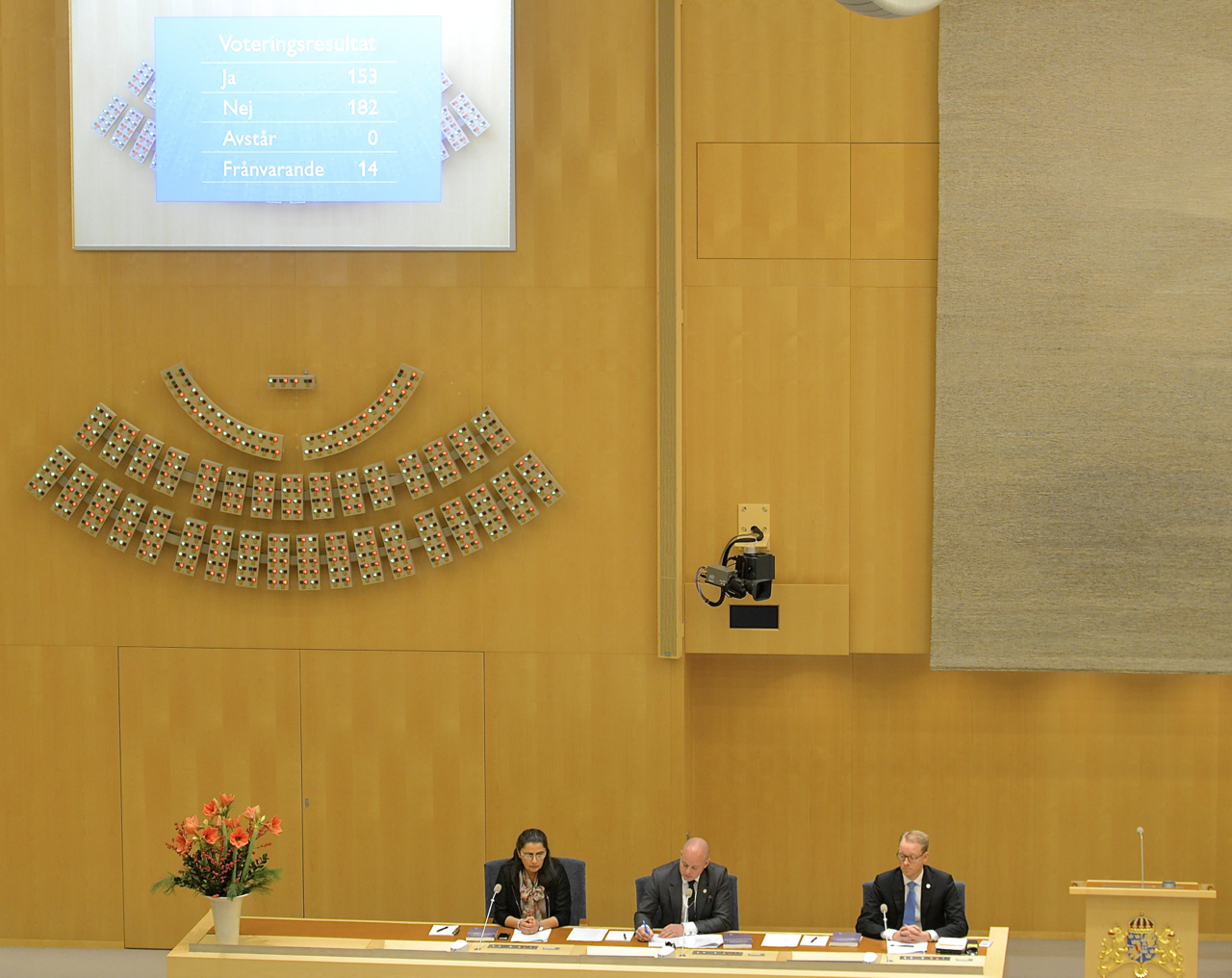
- The budget vote on 3 December, where the proposal from the Löfven I cabinet fell 182 to 153
- Date: 3–27 December 2014
- Type: Government crisis
- Cause: SD voting for the Alliance opposition's budget proposal
- Participants: Social Democrats (S); Moderate Party (M); Sweden Democrats (SD); Green Party (MP); Centre Party (C); Left Party (V); Liberal People's Party (FP); Christian Democrats (KD)
- Outcome: Alliance opposition's budget proposal passes; Prime Minister Löfven declares a snap election; December Agreement is reached between S, M, MP, C, FP, and KD; Löfven calls off snap election; S–MP Löfven I cabinet governs with the Alliance opposition's budget in spring 2015

The 2014 Swedish government crisis (Swedish: Regeringskrisen i Sverige 2014) started on 3 December 2014 after the Riksdag rejected the proposed government budget in favour of a budget proposed by the centre-right opposition.

The Sweden Democrats declared at a press conference on 2 December 2014 that they would secondarily vote for the government budget proposed by other opposition parties in the centre-right Alliance, thus securing a majority for that budget and a defeat for the budget proposed by the centre-left Red-Green Löfven I cabinet. After a meeting between the Social Democrats, the Green Party and the parties of the Alliance did not lead to any solution or any plans of further negotiations, the Alliance's budget passed in the Riksdag on 3 December with a margin of 182 to 153 (14 parliamentarians not attending the meeting). The same day Prime Minister Stefan Löfven declared that the cabinet would call a snap election to be held on 22 March 2015. For constitutional reasons the snap election could not be called until 29 December 2014. If held, the election would have been the first snap election and the first election not held in September since 1958.

On December 27, 2014, Prime Minister Löfven announced the snap election would not be held, following a six-party agreement on future budget procedures involving all major parties but the Left Party and the Sweden Democrats. The agreement fell already in October 2015 when the Christian Democrats decided to leave it. However, the centre-right parties of the Moderates, Centre Party and Liberals allowed the minority Löfven I cabinet to continue to govern.

== Background ==
The 2014 Swedish general election led to a situation where no political block gained a majority on their own. Stefan Löfven formed the minority Löfven I cabinet consisting of his Social Democrats and the Green Party, which was supported by the Left Party. However, the three parties did not hold a majority in the Riksdag and would need support from at least one opposition party in order to pass legislation. In the opposition, the centre-right Alliance consisted of the Moderate Party, the Centre Party, the Liberal People's Party and the Christian Democrats. The balance of power was held by the Sweden Democrats, a nationalist party. The other parties maintained a policy of refusing to co-operate with the Sweden Democrats.

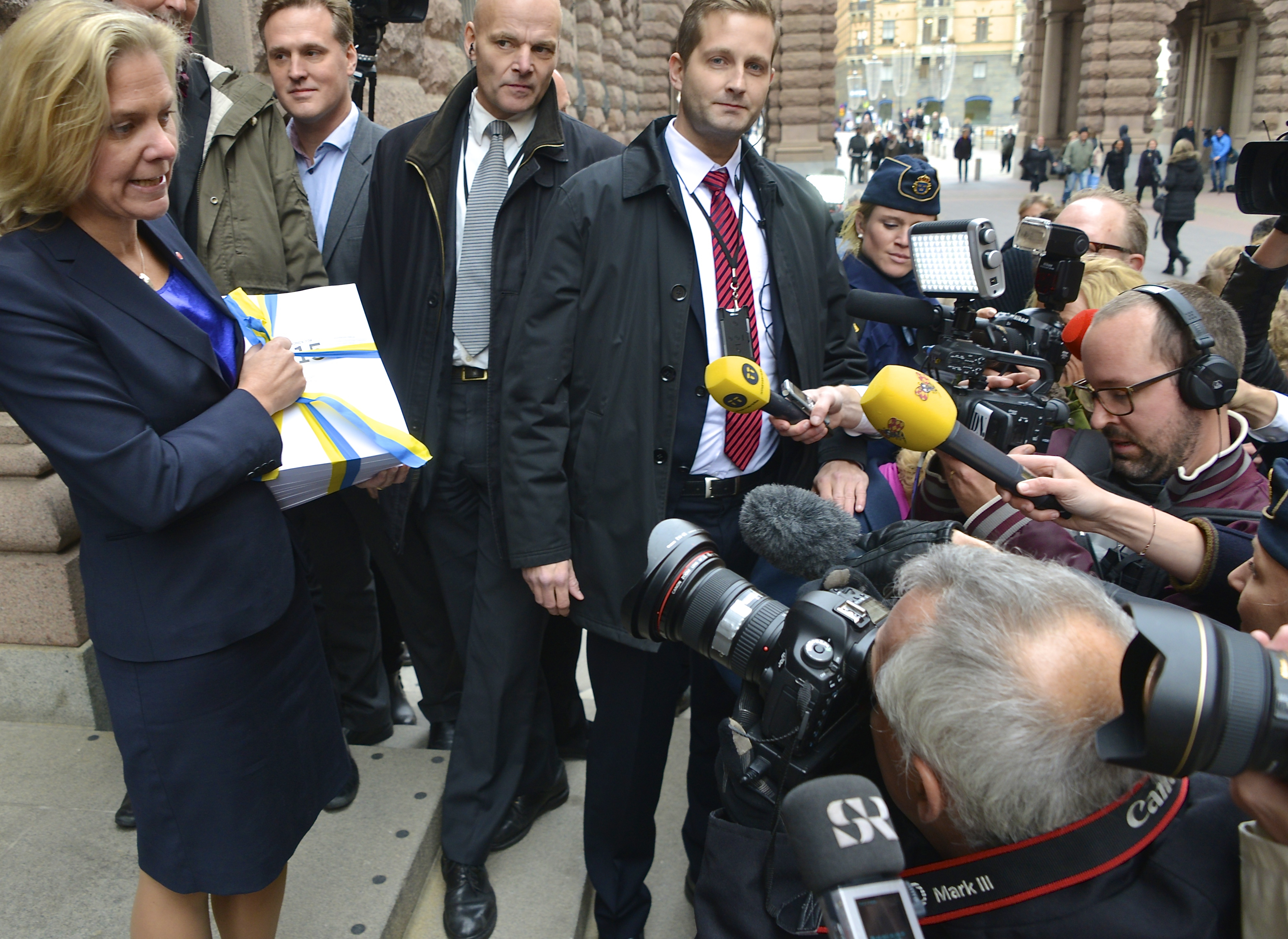
Minister for Finance Magdalena Andersson (left) on her way to the Riksdag to present the budget on 23 October 2014

The budget proposal from the Löfven I cabinet was made in co-operation with the Left Party. The budget was presented to the Riksdag by Minister for Finance Magdalena Andersson on 23 October. The Alliance presented an alternative budget proposal on 10 November. Their budget was practically similar regarding migration, the main issue for the Sweden Democrats. The Sweden Democrats presented their own alternative budget proposal.

The usual practice in the Riksdag is that parties only vote for their primary budget proposal. During the 2014 autumn session, the Sweden Democrats said that they would consider deviating from the practice by voting for the Alliance budget after their own proposal failed. Their party leader Jimmie Åkesson was on sick leave due to burnout in October leaving Mattias Karlsson as acting leader. Several political commentators expressed doubts that the Sweden Democrats would be prepared to cause a cabinet crisis and a potential extra election. By November, it looked likely that the Sweden Democrat representatives would ally themselves against the Löfven I cabinet. A poll the same month found that 71% of the Sweden Democrats' voters were in favour of the party voting for the budget proposal from the Alliance.

== Rejection of the budget ==
On the morning of 2 December 2014, Prime Minister Löfven said he and the Löfven I cabinet would not continue to govern if their budget proposal was defeated. In the afternoon, the Sweden Democrats held a press conference led by acting leader Mattias Karlsson and spokesperson on economic issues Oscar Sjöstedt, which ended with a statement that the party would vote for the Alliance's budget proposal the next day after their own proposal had failed. The party declared that they found it unacceptable that the expenses to asylum seekers were increasing from what they considered an already too high level and therefore wanted a cabinet crisis even though the Alliance's alternative budget included the same expenses regarding migration. They further declared that they would be prepared to vote down all future budgets from a potential new cabinet from the Alliance in a similar way, and that their main goal was to reduce what they saw as the Green Party's influence over Swedish immigration policy.

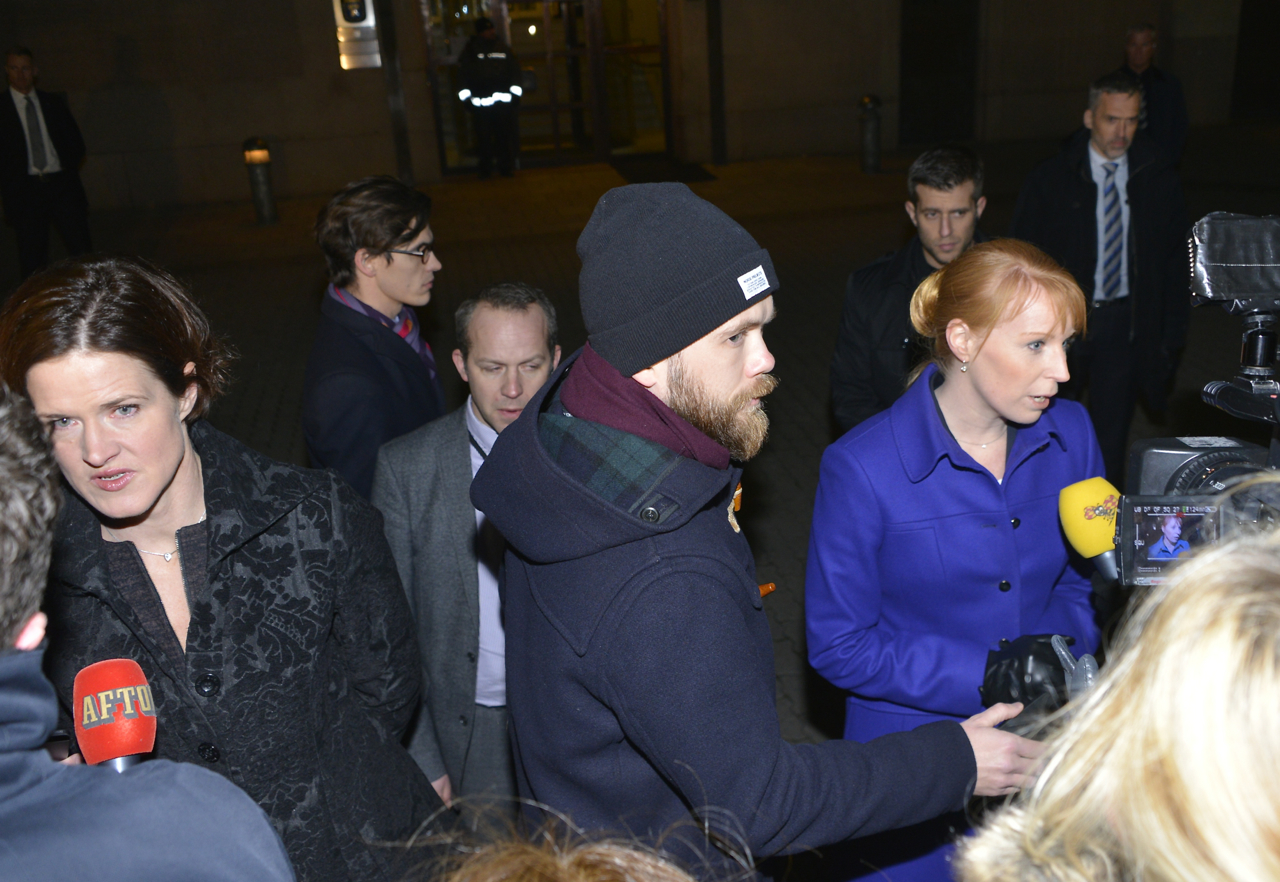
Anna Kinberg Batra (left) and Annie Lööf (right in blue coat) interviewed by the press after the hastily called meeting between cabinet members and the opposition

Following the press conference Prime Minister Löfven invited the four leaders from the Alliance to a meeting the same evening at Rosenbad to discuss the situation. All parties accepted the invitation. For the Moderate Party group leader Anna Kinberg Batra attended instead of the party leader Fredrik Reinfeldt, who had declared his intention to step down from politics on the 2014 election night. The other parties were represented by their party leaders, Annie Lööf (Centre Party), Göran Hägglund (Christian Democrats) and Jan Björklund (Liberal People's Party). The cabinet was represented by Prime Minister Löfven, Minister of Finance Magdalena Andersson, both Social Democrats, and the two spokesperson for the Green Party, Deputy Prime Minister Åsa Romson and Minister for Education Gustav Fridolin.

The Alliance leaders signaled before the meeting that they did not want to negotiate about the budget and stood fully by their own budget proposal. The meeting lasted somewhat over an hour and in interviews immediately afterwards the Alliance leaders confirmed that there had been no negotiations on the budget matter; the Alliance had, however, expressed wish to co-operate about procedural changes regarding decision making in the Riksdag to avoid similar situations in the future and make it easier for minority cabinets to govern.

The same evening Löfven held a press conference with the three other cabinet ministers who had attended the meeting where he expressed regret that no progress had been made in talks with the Alliance. He stated that he had not decided whether he would resign or call a new election and that there might be "other alternatives".

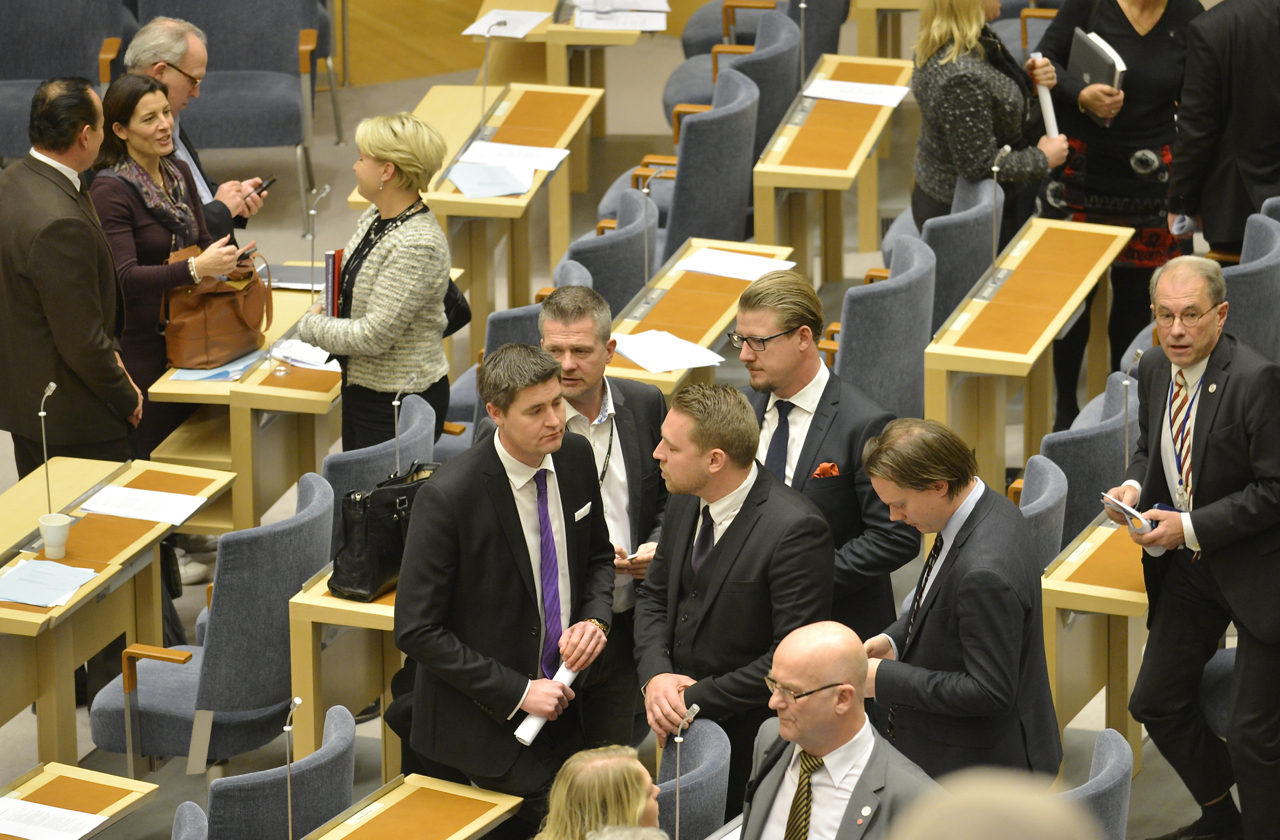
In center, Sweden Democratic representatives, including Mattias Karlsson, in the Riksdag after the Löfven cabinet's budget fell

On 3 December, the Riksdag debated the three budget proposals from the cabinet, the Alliance and the Sweden Democrats and in the afternoon voted over which budget to approve for 2015. According to voting procedures, the parliament first voted over the proposal from the Sweden Democrats, which only got their votes. As they had planned, the Sweden Democrats then voted in favour of the budget proposal from the Alliance. The latter gained 183 votes against 153 for the cabinet's proposal.

== Plans for a snap election ==
The budget voting was followed by a press conference by Prime Minister Löfven and Minister for Education Fridolin where Löfven said the cabinet would call a snap election to the Riksdag to be held on 22 March 2015. According to the Constitution of Sweden a snap election can not be called before three month after the Riksdag has convened after the ordinary election, therefore the election could not be called until 29 December. In addition, the new Riksdag would only be elected to serve the rest of the existing Riksdag's term; the date of the 2018 general election would not be changed.

In his statement, Löfven said the Sweden Democrats had declared they would be willing to overthrow every cabinet they disagreed with on immigration politics and said this caused a new political situation in Sweden. He further said he regretted what he saw as the Alliance's rejection of a closer co-operation with the cabinet. In a later press conference the leaders of the Alliance blamed the crisis on Löfven. The Sweden Democrats welcomed the plans for a new election and said they would focus their campaign on immigration.

In a poll conducted via web 69% said they believed that the decision to call an election was right under the circumstances, while 29% disagreed. 48% held Löfven responsible for the situation, 47% held SD-leader Jimmie Åkesson responsible, while the share who held the leaders in the Alliance responsible varied from 30 to 38%.

The Moderate Party had been preparing to hold a party congress in March to elect a new leader after Fredrik Reinfeldt had stepped down. On 3 December 2014, they announced that the congress would take place on 10 January 2015 due to the snap election. On 9 December, the party declared that the nomination committee had nominated Anna Kinberg Batra for new leader.

== Analysis ==
Löfven formally could have chosen to govern if the Alliance's budget was passed into law, and proposed relatively minor changes to the budget in the spring when the budget is adjusted. However, this option had been rejected by Löfven beforehand and was seen by political commentators as politically impossible.

There has been some debate among politicians and political commentators over whether it would have been more correct and appropriate of Löfven to ask the Speaker of the Parliament to explore the possibility of forming another cabinet instead of announcing a new election. The Löfven I cabinet would then have functioned as a caretaker government in the interim.

According to Swedish media, the Alliance had been prepared to form a minority government after their budget was adopted and said that they were surprised by Löfven's decision to call an extra election. However, the Sweden Democrats had said they would be prepared to use similar tactics against an Alliance minority government.

== Resolution ==
On 27 December Löfven called off the snap election after six-party talks had resulted in agreements where the government and the opposition would seek common ground on policy. Named the "December Agreement" (decemberöverenskommelsen), the deal effectively let a minority coalition govern without needing to form a parliamentary majority through a loyal opposition, with the only requirement being to become the larger of the two main blocks. The opposition would not vote on their own budget, in order to prevent the Sweden Democrats to be able to put political pressure by threatening to make the opposition budget win.

The agreement was so controversial, as 34% of respondents believed the deal to be "undemocratic" according to a survey. The deal was also met with strong criticism from senior politicians of both blocks, including former Moderate Party leader Ulf Adelsohn denouncing it as "an unconditional capitulation", former Culture Ministers Lena Adelsohn Liljeroth and Cecilia Stegö Chilò, and former Defence Ministers Anders Björck and Mikael Odenberg, the latter describing the deal as "a defeat for democracy and parliamentarism". Green Party MEP and former spokesperson Peter Eriksson stated the deal to be "a huge democratic problem" that "in its very function bypasses the usual rules of democracy". Eriksson also remarked that in most democratic countries making such a deal would not be possible.

The December Agreement was cancelled on 9 October 2015 when the Christian Democrats decided to leave it. However, the centre-right parties of the Moderates, Centre Party and Liberals allowed the minority Löfven I cabinet to continue to govern. The continued resolution of the crisis was done by having the Alliance parties propose each their own budget. That way no opposition budget could together with the Sweden Democrats win the Riksdag voting.

== See also ==
- 2018–2019 Swedish government formation
- 2021 Swedish government crisis
- 2021 Swedish government formation
