= 2014 Swedish general election =

- 14 September 2014

All 349 seats in the Riksdag 175 seats needed for a majority
- Registered: 7,330,432
- Turnout: 85.8% (▲1.2 pp)
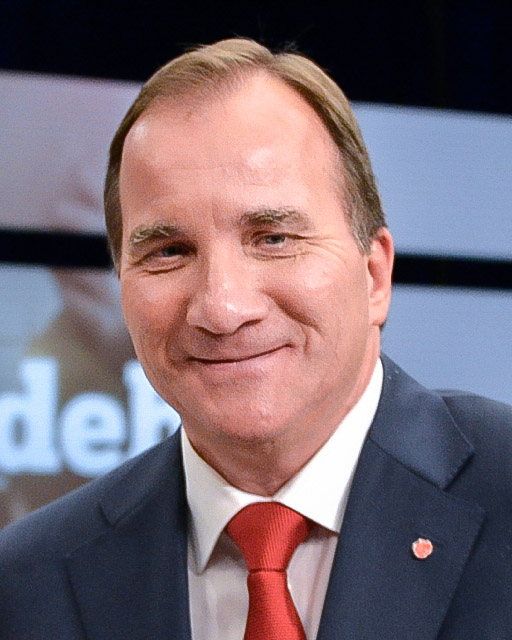

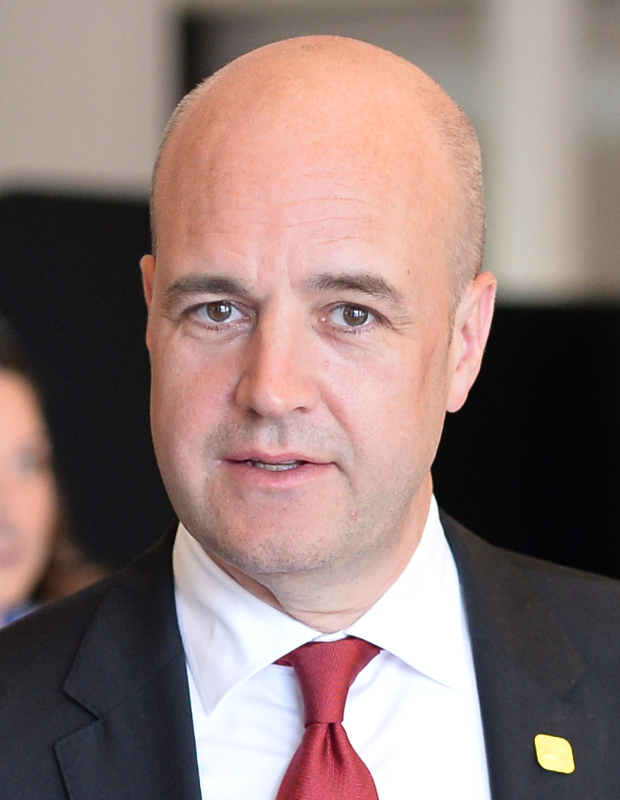

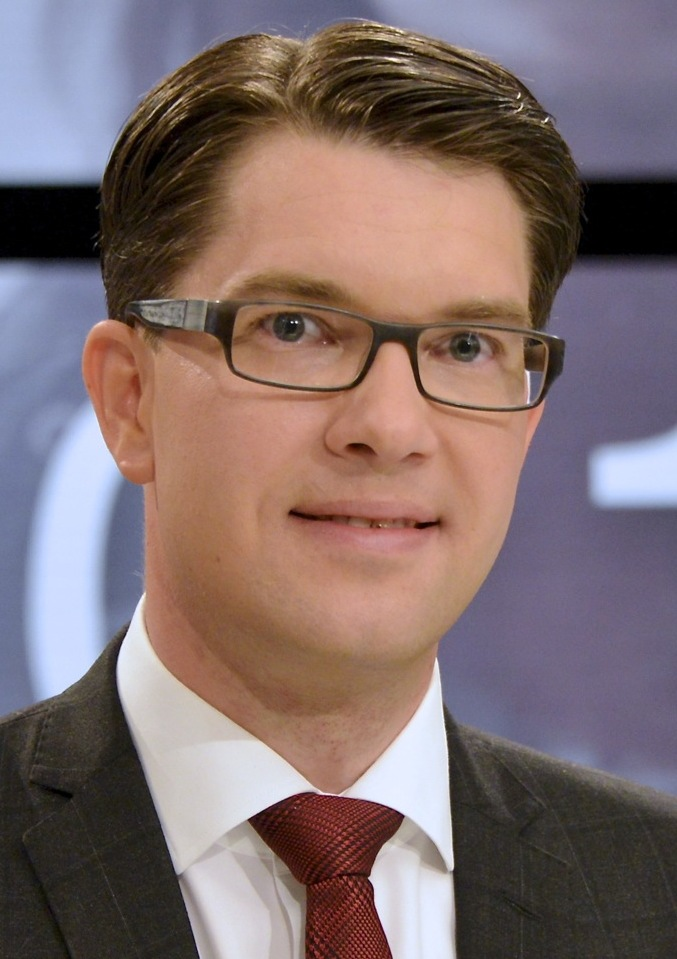

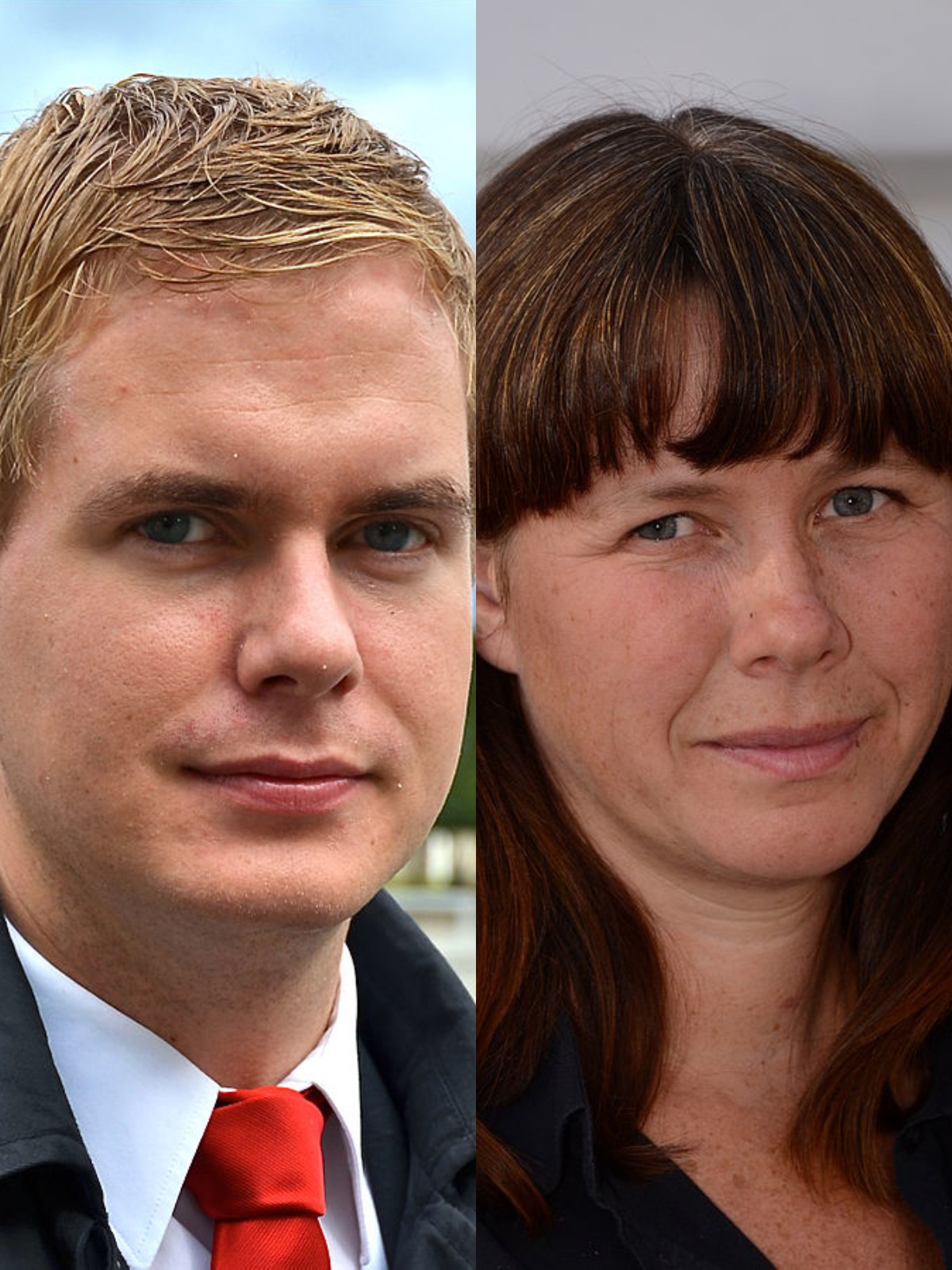

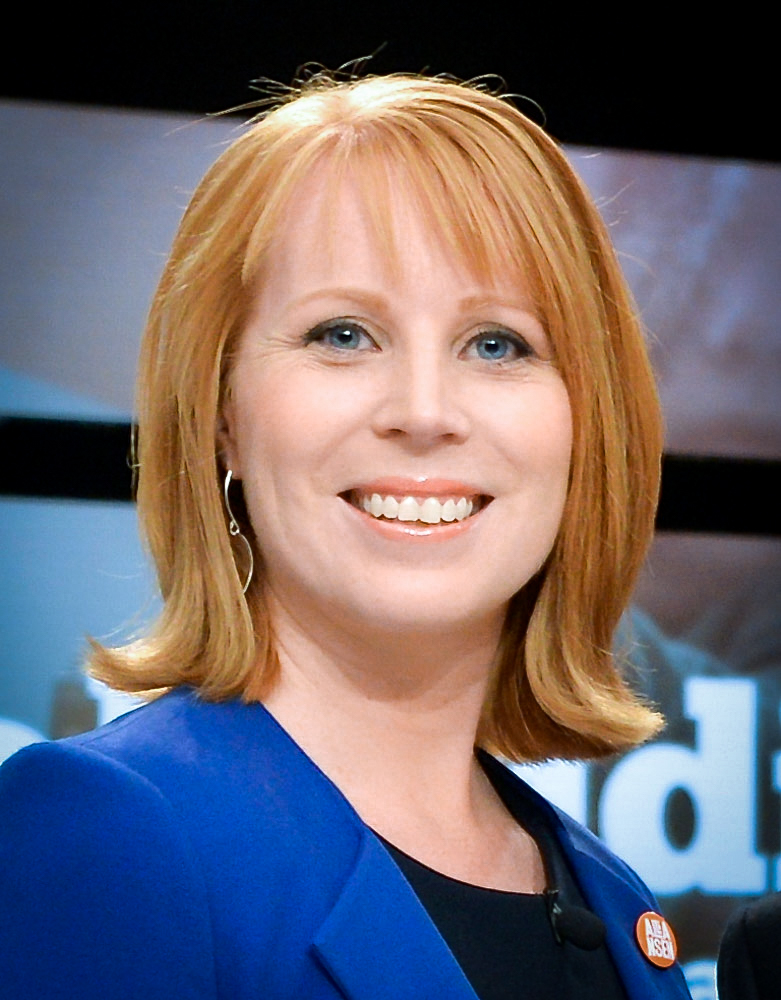

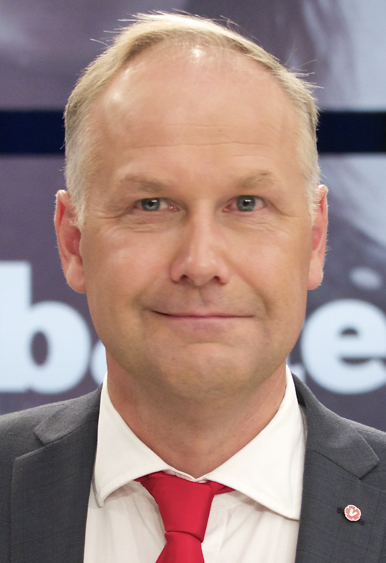

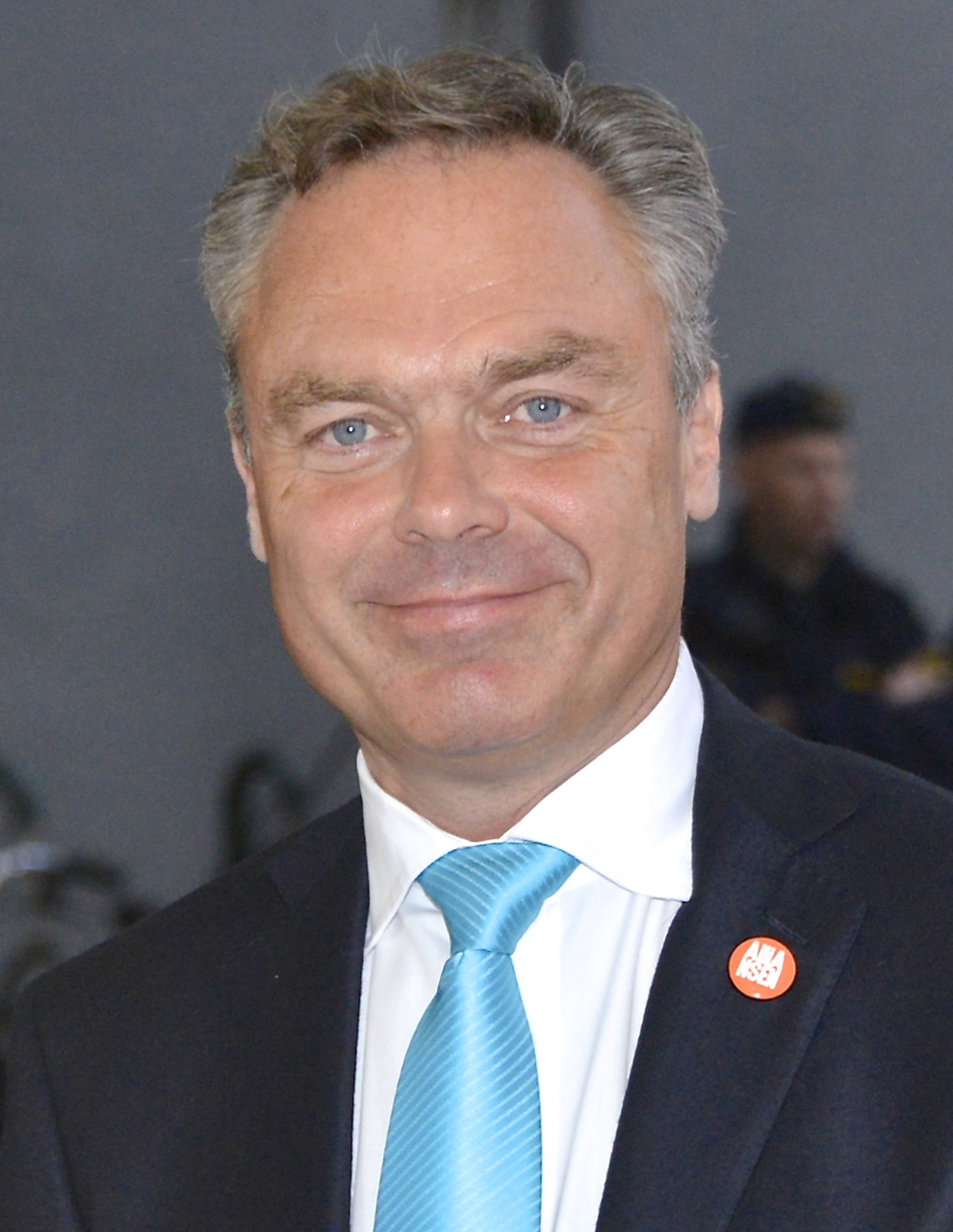

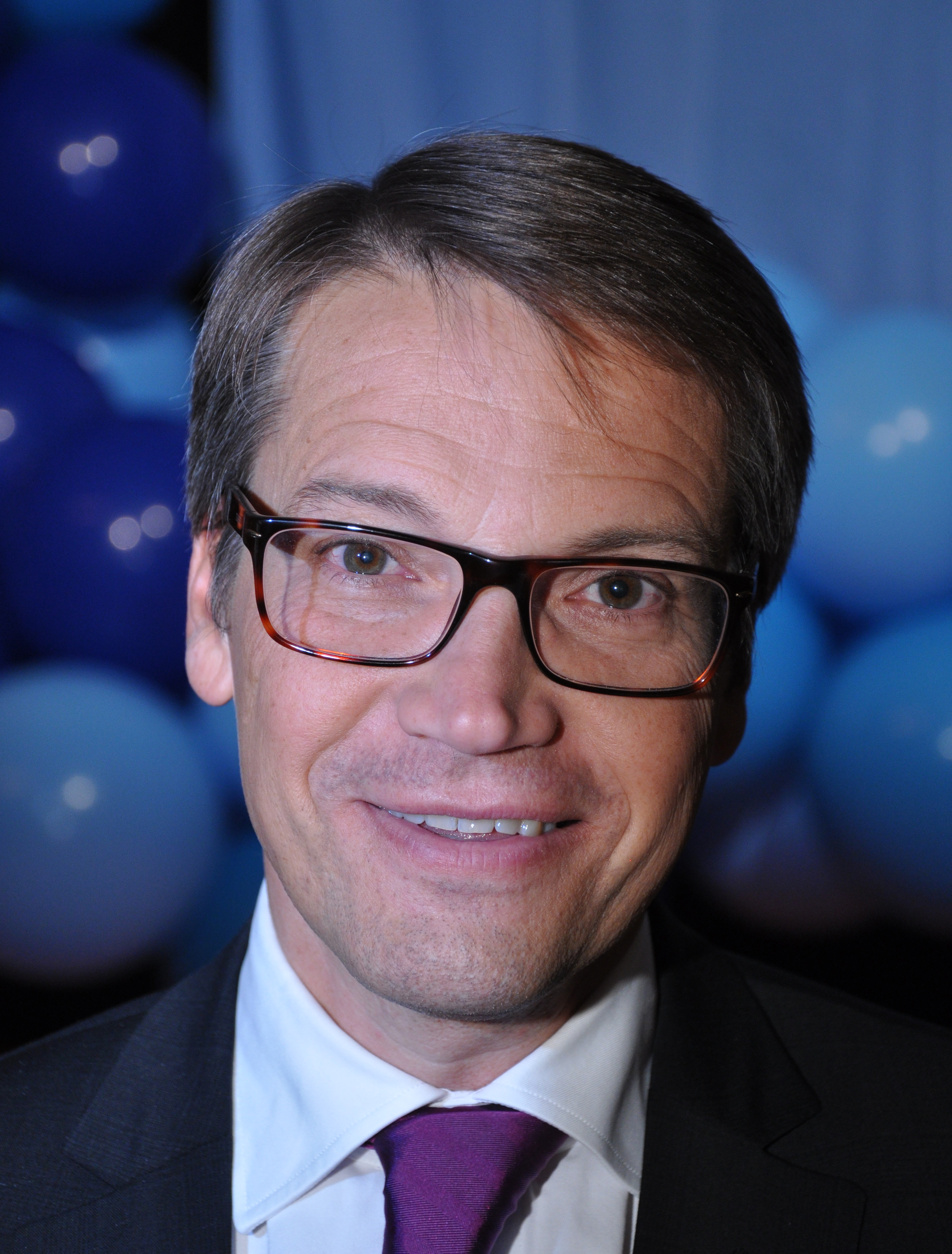
	First party	Second party	Third party
Leader	Stefan Löfven	Fredrik Reinfeldt	Jimmie Åkesson
Party	Social Democrats	Moderate	Sweden Democrats
Alliance		The Alliance
Last election	30.7%, 112 seats	30.1%, 107 seats	5.7%, 20 seats
Seats won	113	84	49
Seat change	▲1	▼23	▲29
Popular vote	1,932,711	1,453,517	801,178
Percentage	31.0%	23.3%	12.9%
Swing	▲0.3 pp	▼6.8 pp	▲7.2 pp
	Fourth party	Fifth party	Sixth party
Leader	Gustav Fridolin; Åsa Romson	Annie Lööf	Jonas Sjöstedt
Party	Green	Centre	Left
Alliance		The Alliance
Last election	7.3%, 25 seats	6.6%, 23 seats	5.6%, 19 seats
Seats won	25	22	21
Seat change	0	▼1	▲2
Popular vote	429,275	380,937	356,331
Percentage	6.9%	6.1%	5.7%
Swing	▼0.4 pp	▼0.5 pp	▲0.1 pp
	Seventh party	Eighth party
Leader	Jan Björklund	Göran Hägglund
Party	People's Party (Liberals)	Christian Democrats
Alliance	The Alliance	The Alliance
Last election	7.1%, 24 seats	5.6%, 19 seats
Seats won	19	16
Seat change	▼5	▼3
Popular vote	337,773	284,806
Percentage	5.4%	4.6%
Swing	▼1.7 pp	▼1.0 pp
Prime Minister before election
Fredrik Reinfeldt
Moderate
Prime Minister after election
Stefan Löfven
Social Democrats

General elections were held in Sweden on 14 September 2014 to elect all 349 seats in the Riksdag, alongside elections for the 21 county councils, and 290 municipal assemblies.

The centre-right Alliance for Sweden coalition (comprising the Moderate Party, Liberal People's Party, Centre Party, and Christian Democrats) sought a third term in government. In contrast to the previous election, the three largest parties on the left (the Social Democrats, Green Party, and Left Party) ran independent campaigns, as did the far-right Sweden Democrats. The left-wing party Feminist Initiative did not pass the 4% threshold.

The election result saw the largest three parties on the left outpoll the Alliance for Sweden, with the two blocs respectively winning 159 and 141 seats. The Sweden Democrats doubled their support and won the remaining 49 seats. The party's biggest gain came from gaining about the same number of the vote share as the Moderate Party lost but also made strong inroads into traditionally red municipalities in the central region of Svealand. The Sweden Democrats also became the largest party in two rural municipalities in Scania in the party's southern heartlands. Fredrik Reinfeldt, the incumbent prime minister, lost his bid for a third term. On 3 October, he was replaced by Stefan Löfven, who formed a minority government consisting of the Social Democrats and Greens. With the result being a hung parliament, this led to the December Agreement to allow the red-green government to pass its budgets after a government crisis later in the autumn.

The leftist parties became the largest courtesy of the collapse of the Alliance vote share into the Sweden Democrat fold, rather than making any sizeable gains. As a result, very few counties returned other results than hung parliament delegations, even historical Social Democratic strongholds such as Blekinge, Dalarna, Södermanland and Västmanland saw the red-greens failed to secure an outright majority in spite of the election win. The 138 seats for the government (37 short of a majority), made it the cabinet with the lowest seat share in Swedish history to begin a term.

== Background ==
The 2010 general election saw the incumbent Alliance for Sweden coalition returned to power, though it lost its majority in the Riksdag and had to continue as a minority government. The coalition relied on ad hoc support from the opposition to pass legislation, particularly the Green Party. Immigration critics Sweden Democrats entered the Riksdag for the first time in 2010 and was an isolated part of the opposition, in many cases voting with the government when the two blocs were divided. The Alliance got its budget passed on all occasions, but suffered a key loss when the opposition 'took out' a passage regarding the increased cutoff for when state income tax should be paid in late 2013.

The previous parliament had also passed some amendments to the Constitution of Sweden. Election days were moved from the third Sunday of September to the second Sunday of the same month. Another change was that the incumbent Prime Minister of Sweden, should he or she not resign immediately after the election, must be approved by the new Riksdag.

== Incumbent parties ==
The Social Democratic Party (S; Socialdemokraterna) was the largest political party in the Swedish Riksdag with 112 of the 349 seats. The Social Democratic Party had led a single-party government from 1994 to 2006, and had been the major political power of Sweden for much of the 20th century. For the 2010 general election the Social Democratic Party collaborated with the Green Party and the Left Party and sought to form a Red-Green coalition government. Similar cooperation did not take place prior to the 2014 election. Their current party leader Stefan Löfven has said they could potentially collaborate with the Centre Party and the Liberal People's Party in a future government. By the 2014 general election the Social Democratic Party had been in opposition for eight years, the longest such period in over 100 years.

The Moderate Party (M; Moderaterna) was the second-largest party in the Riksdag with 107 seats. It was the largest governing party under Prime Minister Fredrik Reinfeldt, who was also its leader. Prior to the 2006 general election the Moderate Party had formed the Alliance for Sweden coalition, together with the Centre Party, the Liberal People's Party and the Christian Democrats. After the 2006 election they were able to form a majority coalition government. The Alliance successfully sought re-election in the 2010 general election, but were reduced to a minority coalition government.

The Green Party (MP; Miljöpartiet) was the third-largest party in the Riksdag with 25 seats. They are the only Swedish party to have two spokespersons, currently Gustav Fridolin and Isabella Lövin. The Green Party had participated in the Red-Green coalition prior to the 2010 general election. The coalition, however, lost that election, although the Green Party itself gained seats. The party has shown interest in participating in a future government, but has not made clear with whom.

The Liberal People's Party (FP; Folkpartiet Liberalerna) was the fourth-largest party in the Riksdag with 24 seats. The party had since 2010 been the second-largest governing party under Prime Minister Reinfeldt. Current party leader Jan Björklund was Deputy Prime Minister of Sweden and Sweden's Minister for Education. Prior to the 2006 general election the Liberal People's Party had formed the Alliance for Sweden coalition together with the Moderate Party, the Centre Party and the Christian Democrats. They formed a majority coalition government in 2006 and a minority coalition government in 2010.

The Centre Party (C; Centerpartiet) was the fifth-largest party in the Riksdag with 23 seats. The party had since 2010 been the third-largest governing party under Prime Minister Reinfeldt, having been the second-largest from 2006 to 2010. Current party leader Annie Lööf was Sweden's Minister for Enterprise. Prior to the 2006 general election the Centre Party had formed the Alliance for Sweden coalition together with the Moderate Party, the Liberal People's Party and the Christian Democrats. They formed a majority coalition government in 2006 and a minority coalition government in 2010.

The Sweden Democrats (SD; Sverigedemokraterna) was the sixth-largest party in the Riksdag with 20 seats. In the 2010 general election, the party had for the first time ever passed the 4% election threshold and entered the Riksdag. The party leader was Jimmie Åkesson. The other Riksdag parties have repeatedly stated that they will not cooperate with the Sweden Democrats in a future government.

The Left Party (V; Vänsterpartiet) was the seventh-largest party in the Riksdag with 19 seats. The current party leader was Jonas Sjöstedt. The Left Party had participated in the Red-Green coalition prior to the 2010 general election which sought confidence to govern Sweden; however, this coalition lost the election. The party has shown interest in participating in a future government consisting of the Red-Green parties. The party has said that it will not support a future government of which it is not a part.

The Christian Democrats (KD; Kristdemokraterna) was the eighth-largest party in the Riksdag with 19 seats. It was the fourth-largest governing party under Prime Minister Reinfeldt. The current party leader Göran Hägglund was Sweden's Minister for Health and Social Affairs. Prior to the 2006 general election the Christian Democrats had formed the Alliance for Sweden coalition, together with the Moderate Party, the Liberal People's Party and the Centre Party. They formed a majority coalition government in 2006 and a minority coalition government in 2010.

=== Debates ===
2014 Swedish general election debates
Date	Time (CEST)	Organizers	Moderator	P Present I Invitee N Non-invitee								Refs
Date	Time (CEST)	Organizers	Moderator	S	M	SD	C	V	KD	FP	MP	Refs
1 Sep	19:00	Aftonbladet	Karin Magnusson; Malvina Britts	P Stefan Löfven	P Fredrik Reinfeldt	P Jimmie Åkesson	P Annie Lööf	P Jonas Sjöstedt	P Göran Hägglund	P Jan Björklund	P Gustav Fridolin	
3 Sep	19:00	Expressen	Niklas Svensson	P Stefan Löfven	P Fredrik Reinfeldt	P Jimmie Åkesson	P Annie Lööf	P Jonas Sjöstedt	P Göran Hägglund	P Jan Björklund	P Åsa Romson	
10 Sep	15:00	SR P1	Monica Saarinen; Lasse Johansson	P Stefan Löfven	P Fredrik Reinfeldt	P Jimmie Åkesson	P Annie Lööf	P Jonas Sjöstedt	P Göran Hägglund	P Jan Björklund	P Åsa Romson	
11 Sep	21.00	TV4	Jenny Strömstedt; Anders Pihlblad	P Stefan Löfven	P Fredrik Reinfeldt	P Jimmie Åkesson	P Annie Lööf	P Jonas Sjöstedt	P Göran Hägglund	P Jan Björklund	P Åsa Romson	
12 Sep	20:00	SVT	Anna Hedenmo; Mats Knutson	P Stefan Löfven	P Fredrik Reinfeldt	P Jimmie Åkesson	P Annie Lööf	P Jonas Sjöstedt	P Göran Hägglund	P Jan Björklund	P Gustav Fridolin	

== Leadership changes ==
The election took place with several changes in party leadership from the 2010 election.

=== Social Democratic Party ===
Social Democratic party leader Mona Sahlin stepped down after her party's poor election results in 2010. She was replaced by Håkan Juholt at the party congress on 25 March 2011. Juholt was previously the chairman for the parliamentary committee on defence issues (försvarsutskottet), and a 16-year MP representing Kalmar. At the time of his appointment, Juholt was considered by political commentators to represent the more traditional left wing of the Social Democratic Party.

However, Juholt's time as party chairman only lasted ten months before he resigned on 21 January 2012 amid controversy surrounding a political affair. The party executive board announced their endorsement of Stefan Löfven as the new party chairman on 26 January 2012; he was elected chairman of the party by members the following day. Löfven was the chairman of IF Metall until his appointment and has had a long career as a trade union leader. As Löfven was not an elected MP, he remained unable to participate in the day-to-day activities and debates in the Riksdag.

=== Green Party ===
The Green Party's co-spokespeople both stepped down, having both served the maximum nine years allowed by the party's constitution, and were officially replaced by a party congress in May 2011. A nominating committee nominated Gustav Fridolin (MP for Skåne Northern and Eastern) and Åsa Romson (party spokesperson for environmental and climate policy, and MP for Stockholm Municipality). However, economic policy spokesperson Mikaela Valtersson also expressed her intention to challenge Romson for the nomination. Other candidates identified by the press included Yvonne Ruwaida and Carl Schlyter. On 21 May 2011, the party congress elected Fridolin and Romson as the party's new co-spokespersons.

=== Centre Party ===
In June 2011, Maud Olofsson announced that she would not stand for re-election as leader of the Centre Party. On 23 September 2011, Annie Lööf was elected as the party's new leader.

=== Left Party ===
In August 2011, Lars Ohly, the leader of the Left Party, made public that he would step down after the party's poor showing in the election. Ohly stated he would remain an MP. Jonas Sjöstedt was elected new party leader at the party congress on 6 January 2012.

=== Christian Democrats ===
At the national party conference in January 2012, the Christian Democrats leader Göran Hägglund was challenged for the leadership by MP and former cabinet minister Mats Odell. The leadership battle ended in a vote at the conference, where Hägglund prevailed. Afterwards, Odell announced that he would resign as leader of the party's parliamentary group, and not seek reelection in 2014.

== Opinion polls ==
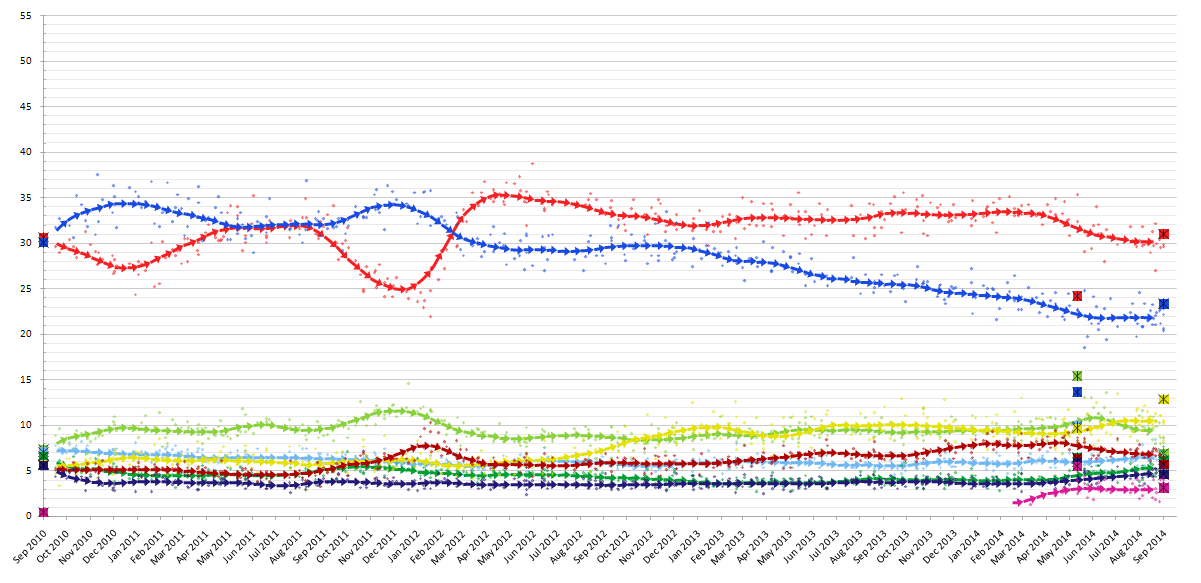
15-day average trend line of poll results from September 2010 to September 2014, with each line corresponding to a political party.

== Results ==
The election was apart from the sharp decline of the Moderates and the sharp rise of the Sweden Democrats very similar to 2010. The Feminist Initiative numbers in addition to the other three left of centre-parties indicated a further difference not shown in the division of the mandates, due to FI missing the cutoff point. Still, the Sweden Democrats formally held the balance of power, but neither bloc was willing to go to government with their active support. The Social Democrats got the first go at forming a government after eight years in opposition as Moderate prime minister Fredrik Reinfeldt resigned on election night.

Party	Votes	%	+/–	Seats	+/–
Swedish Social Democratic Party	1,932,711	31.01	+0.35	113	+1
Moderate Party	1,453,517	23.33	−6.74	84	−23
Sweden Democrats	801,178	12.86	+7.16	49	+29
Green Party	429,275	6.89	−0.45	25	0
Centre Party	380,937	6.11	−0.44	22	−1
Left Party	356,331	5.72	+0.11	21	+2
Liberal People's Party	337,773	5.42	−1.63	19	−5
Christian Democrats	284,806	4.57	−1.03	16	−3
Feminist Initiative	194,719	3.12	+2.72	0	0
Pirate Party	26,515	0.43	−0.22	0	0
Unity	6,277	0.10	+0.09	0	0
Party of the Swedes	4,189	0.07	+0.06	0	0
Animals' Party	4,093	0.07	New	0	New
Christian Values Party	3,553	0.06	New	0	New
Independent Rural Party	3,450	0.06	+0.03	0	0
Swedish Senior Citizen Interest Party	3,369	0.05	−0.13	0	0
Direct Democrats	1,417	0.02	+0.02	0	0
Classical Liberal Party	1,210	0.02	+0.01	0	0
Vägvalet	1,037	0.02	New	0	New
Socialist Justice Party	791	0.01	−0.01	0	0
Communist Party	558	0.01	±0.00	0	0
Progressive Party	196	0.00	New	0	New
European Workers Party	140	0.00	±0.00	0	0
Health Party	131	0.00	New	0	New
Peace Democrats	56	0.00	New	0	New
Yellow Party	35	0.00	New	0	New
New Party	32	0.00	New	0	New
Libertarian Justice Party	32	0.00	New	0	New
Scania Party	28	0.00	±0.00	0	0
The New Swedes	18	0.00	New	0	New
Reformist Neutral Party	11	0.00	New	0	0
Republicans	9	0.00	±0.00	0	0
Animal Owner Party	3	0.00	New	0	New
Human Democrats	2	0.00	New	0	New
Write-in votes	3,174	0.05	−0.05	–	–
Total	6,231,573	100.00	–	349	0
Valid votes	6,231,573	99.07			
Invalid/blank votes	58,443	0.93			
Total votes	6,290,016	100.00			
Registered voters/turnout	7,330,432	85.81			
Source: Election Authority

=== Seat distribution ===
Constituency	Total seats	Seats won										
Constituency	Total seats	By party								By coalition		
Constituency	Total seats	S	M	SD	MP	C	V	F	KD	Red-Greens	Alliance	Others
Blekinge	5	3	1	1						3	1	1
Dalarna	11	4	2	2	1	1	1			6	3	2
Gävleborg	11	4	2	2	1	1	1			6	3	2
Gothenburg	17	4	4	2	2	1	2	1	1	8	7	2
Gotland	2	1	1							1	1	
Halland	12	3	3	2	1	1		1	1	4	6	2
Jämtland	4	2	1			1				2	2	
Jönköping	13	4	3	2	1	1		1	1	5	6	2
Kalmar	8	3	2	2		1				3	3	2
Kronoberg	6	2	2	1		1				2	3	1
Malmö	11	3	3	2	1		1	1		5	4	2
Norrbotten	8	5	1	1			1			6	1	1
Örebro	12	4	2	2	1		1	1	1	6	4	2
Östergötland	15	5	3	2	1	1	1	1	1	7	6	2
Skåne North and East	13	3	3	3	1	1		1	1	4	6	3
Skåne South	13	3	4	2	1	1		1	1	4	7	2
Skåne West	11	4	3	2	1			1		5	4	2
Södermanland	11	4	3	2	1		1			6	3	2
Stockholm County	39	9	13	4	3	2	2	3	3	14	21	4
Stockholm Municipality	32	7	9	2	4	2	3	3	2	14	16	2
Uppsala	12	3	3	1	1	1	1	1	1	5	6	1
Värmland	11	5	2	1	1	1	1			7	3	1
Västerbotten	10	5	1	1	1	1	1			7	2	1
Västernorrland	10	5	2	1		1	1			6	3	1
Västmanland	10	4	2	2			1	1		5	3	2
Västra Götaland East	10	4	2	2		1			1	4	4	2
Västra Götaland North	13	4	2	2	1	1	1	1	1	6	5	2
Västra Götaland South	6	3	2	1						3	2	1
Västra Götaland West	13	3	3	2	1	1	1	1	1	5	6	2
Total	349	113	84	49	25	22	21	19	16	159	141	49
Source: Election Authority

=== Results by municipality ===
Social Democratic

Moderate

Sweden Democrats

Green

Centre

Left

Liberal People's Party

Christian Democrats

Feminist Initiative

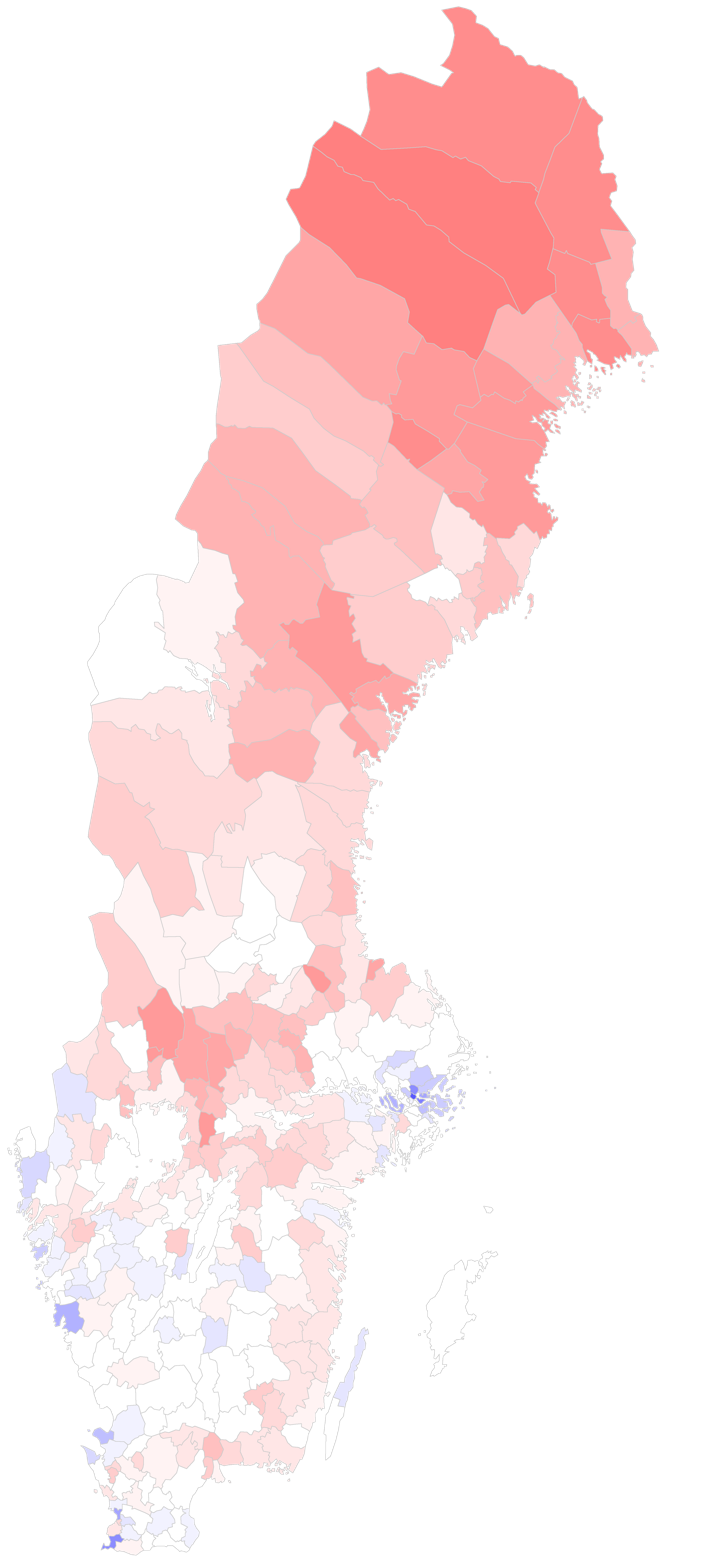
Shaded, red (S+V+MP) to blue (M+C+FP+KD)

== Government formation ==
Possible majorities in the Riksdag	Seats
Total seats	349
Absolute majority (175 or more seats)
S-M-MP-C-FP-KD	279
S-M	197
M-SD-C-FP-KD	190
S-MP-C-FP	179
No majority (174 or fewer seats)
M-SD-FP-KD	168
S-MP-V	159
M-C-FP-KD	141
S-MP	138

The Social Democrats declared that they would seek to form a government, but would not work with the Sweden Democrats. Fredrik Reinfeldt announced he was stepping down as leader of the Moderate Party. The Centre Party and Liberal People's Party rejected the Social Democrats' overtures for a coalition, and the day after the election Stefan Löfven ruled out the possibility of forming a government with the Left Party. This raised the possibility of a minority coalition of the Social Democrats and Greens alone.

On 2 October 2014 the Riksdag elected Löfven as Prime Minister, heading the Löfven Cabinet consisting of the Social Democrats and the Greens.

On 3 December 2014 the government failed to push through its budget after the Sweden Democrats voted with the centre-right opposition, that along with the Sweden Democrats had a sizeable majority for the budget in parliament (those five parties won 190 seats to 159 for the government and the Left Party). Löfven told in a press conference, that an extra election were to be expected and to be held on 22 March. According to the Swedish constitution this election could not be called until 29 December. On 27 December, this new election was cancelled as the Social Democrats and the Greens made an agreement with the Alliance parties which would allow the government's subsequent budgets to pass the Riksdag in return for concessions regarding immigration policy, defence and pensions.
