= List of people from Värnamo =

The following is a list of notable people born in Värnamo and nearby villages.

== A ==
- Agnes Alexiusson, boxer
- Ellen Allgurin, tennis player
- Johan Andersson, footballer
- Anna Anvegård, footballer

== B ==
- Alice Bah Kuhnke, Member of the European Parliament

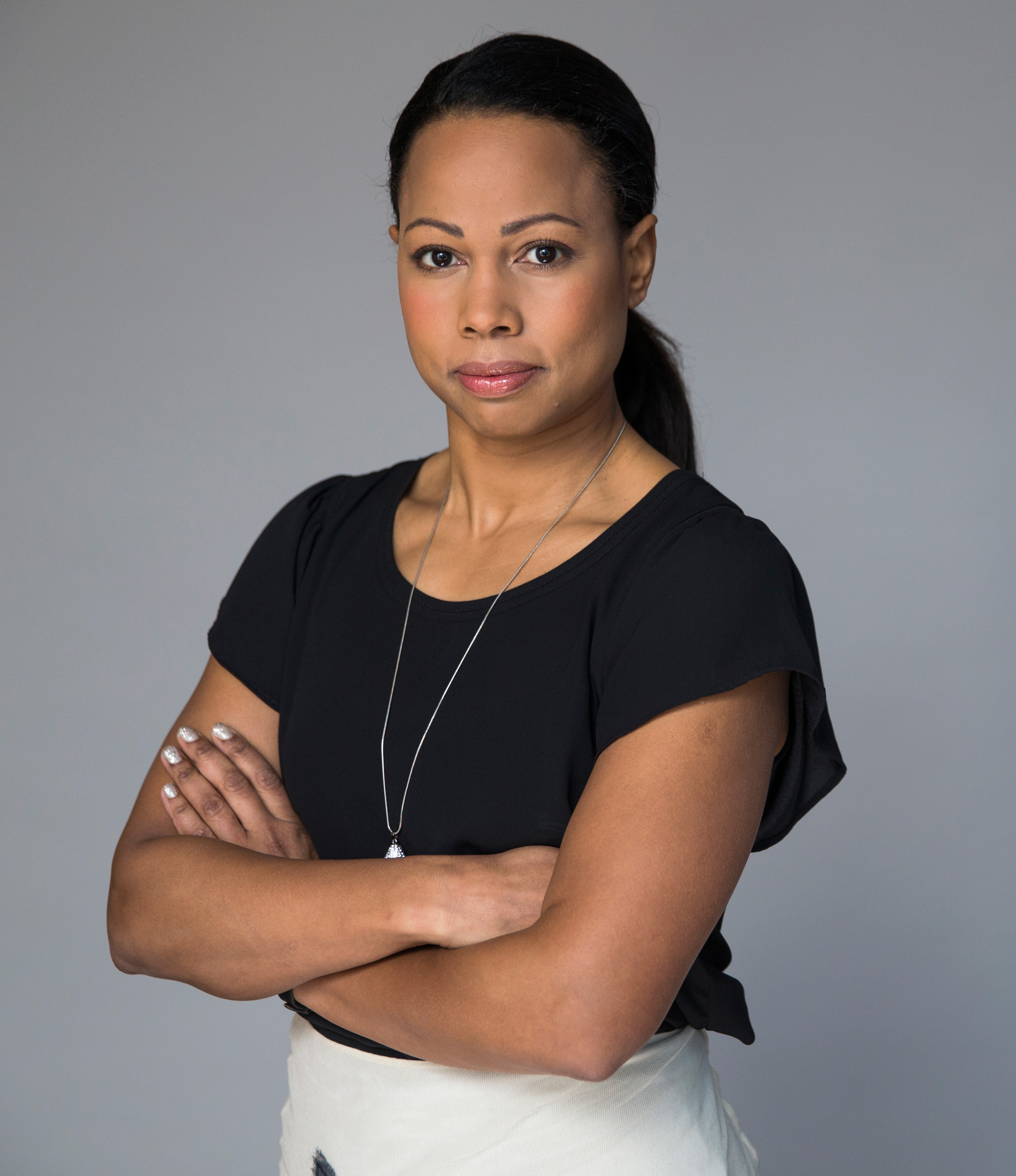
Alice Bah Kuhnke in 2014

- Ulla Billquist, schlager singer

== C ==
- Pär Cederqvist, footballer
- Martin Claesson, footballer
- Viktor Claesson, footballer

== E ==
- Josef Elvby, footballer
- Tobias Englund, footballer

== G ==
- Lars Gustafsson, wrestler

== H ==
- Signe Hebbe, operatic soprano and instructor
- Carl-Axel Heiknert, actor
- Niklas Hult, footballer

== I ==
- Stefan Ingvarsson, racewalker

== J ==
- Ville Jansson, tennis player
- Alexander Johansson, ice hockey player
- Hans-Göran Johansson, former mayor of Värnamo Municipality and father of Annie Lööf
- Per Johansson, footballer
- Sven Johansson, sport shooter

== L ==
- Allan Larsson, politician
- Björn Lekman, speed skater
- John Ljunggren, Olympic gold medalist in racewalking
- Alexander Lundh, motorcycle racer
- Annie Lööf, leader of the Centre Party

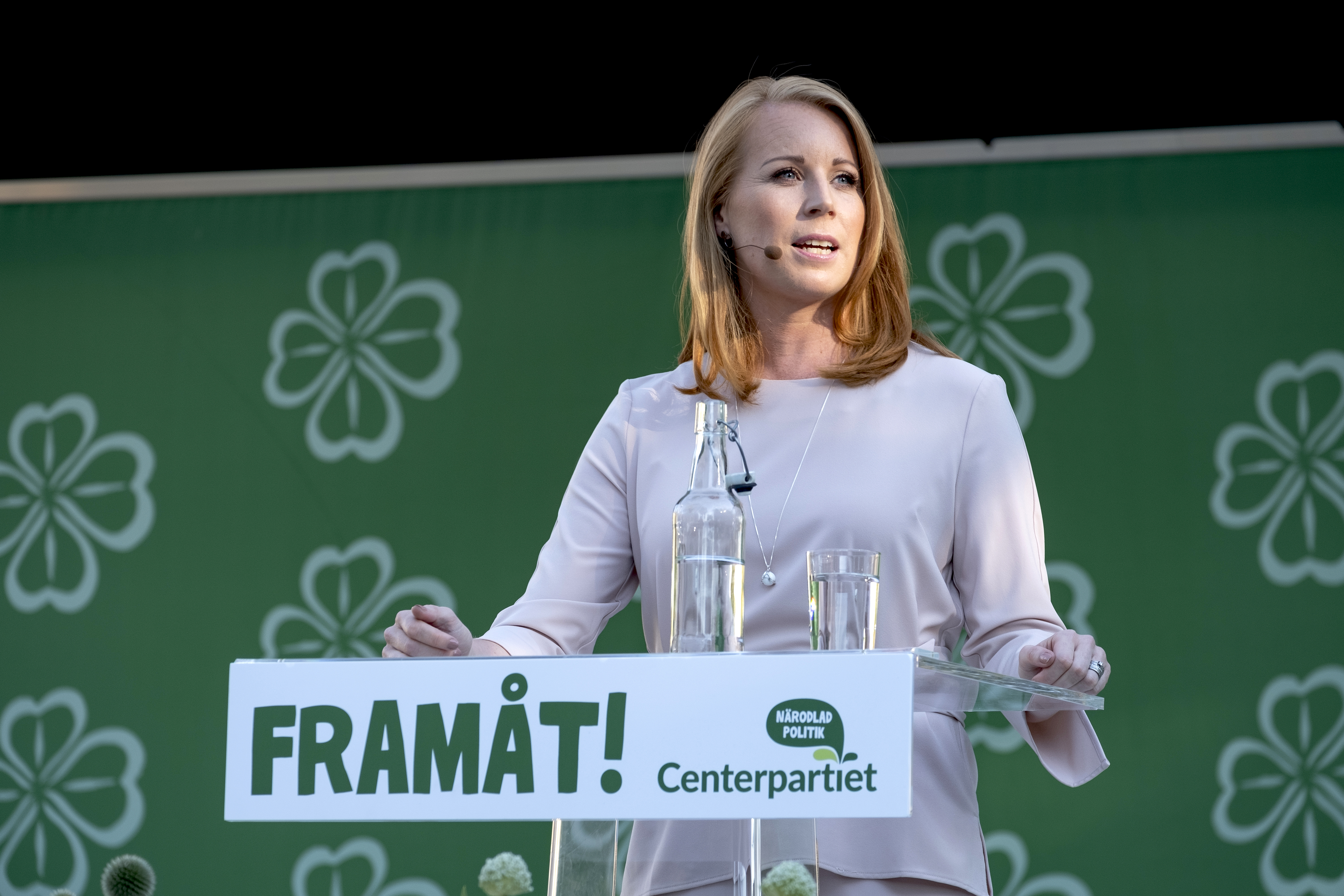
Annie Lööf during the Almedalen Week in 2018

== M ==
- Bruno Mathsson, furniture designer

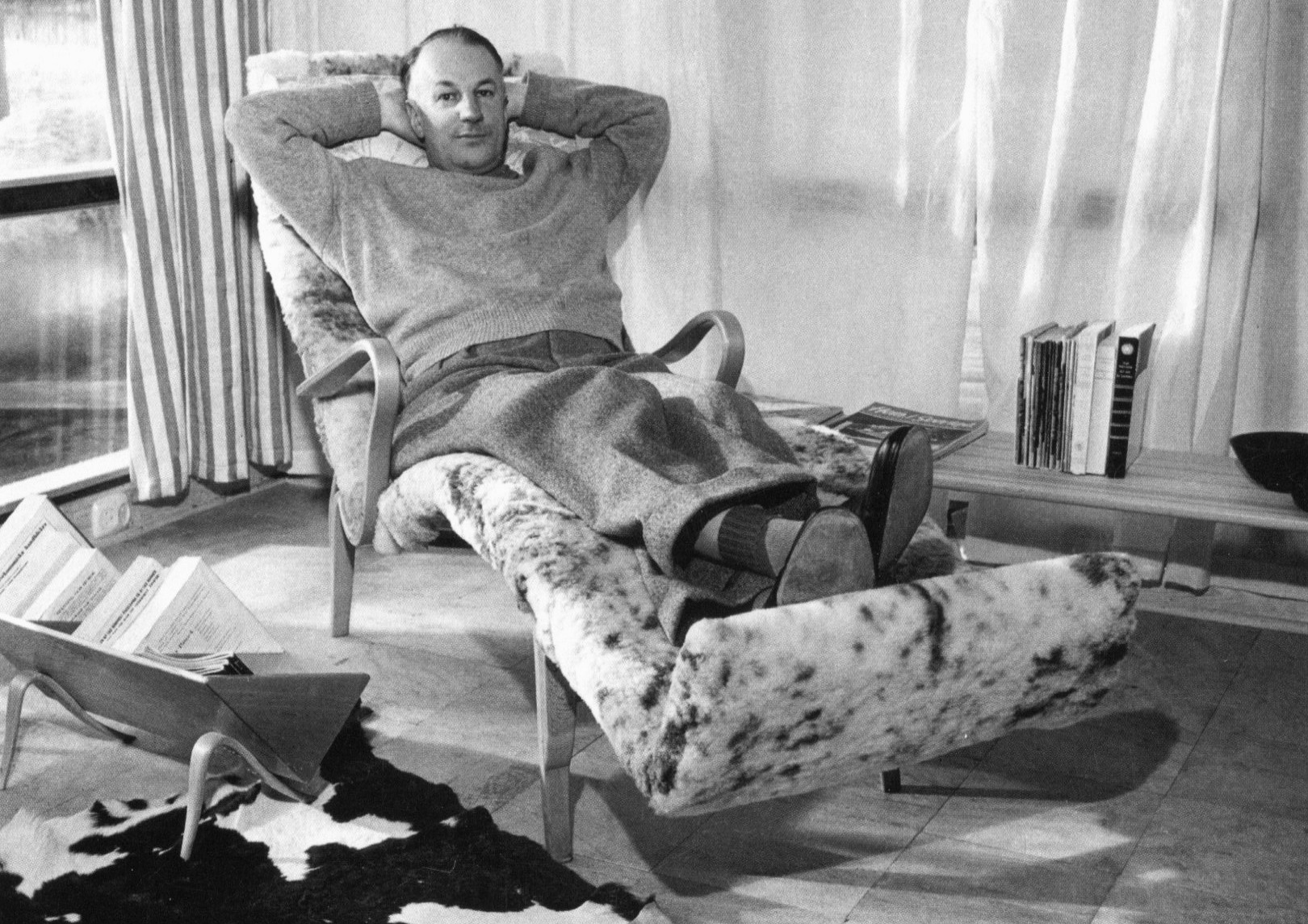
Bruno Mathsson in one of his self-designed armchairs

== N ==
- Jesper Nelin, biathlete and Olympic gold medalist
- Torsten Nothin, former Minister for Justice and Governor of Stockholm
- Patrik Näslund, ice hockey player

== O ==
- Mats Odell, politician
- Sven Ohlsson, wrestler
- Hanna Ouchterlony, creator of the Swedish Salvation Army

== R ==
- Elbasan Rashani, footballer
- Felix Rosenqvist, racing driver

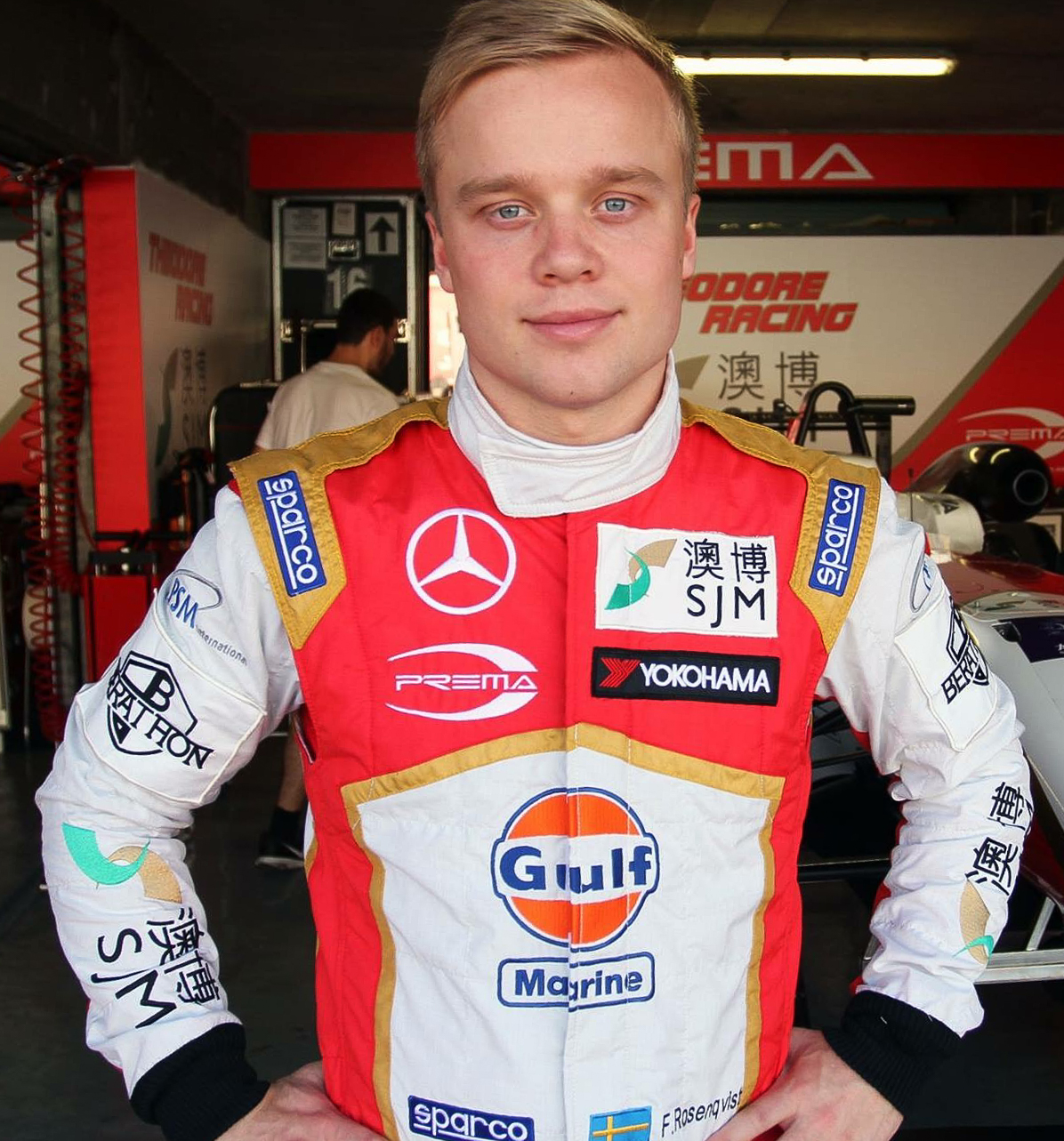
Felix Rosenqvist during the Macau Grand Prix in 2015

- Elize Ryd, singer-songwriter and member of the band Amaranthe

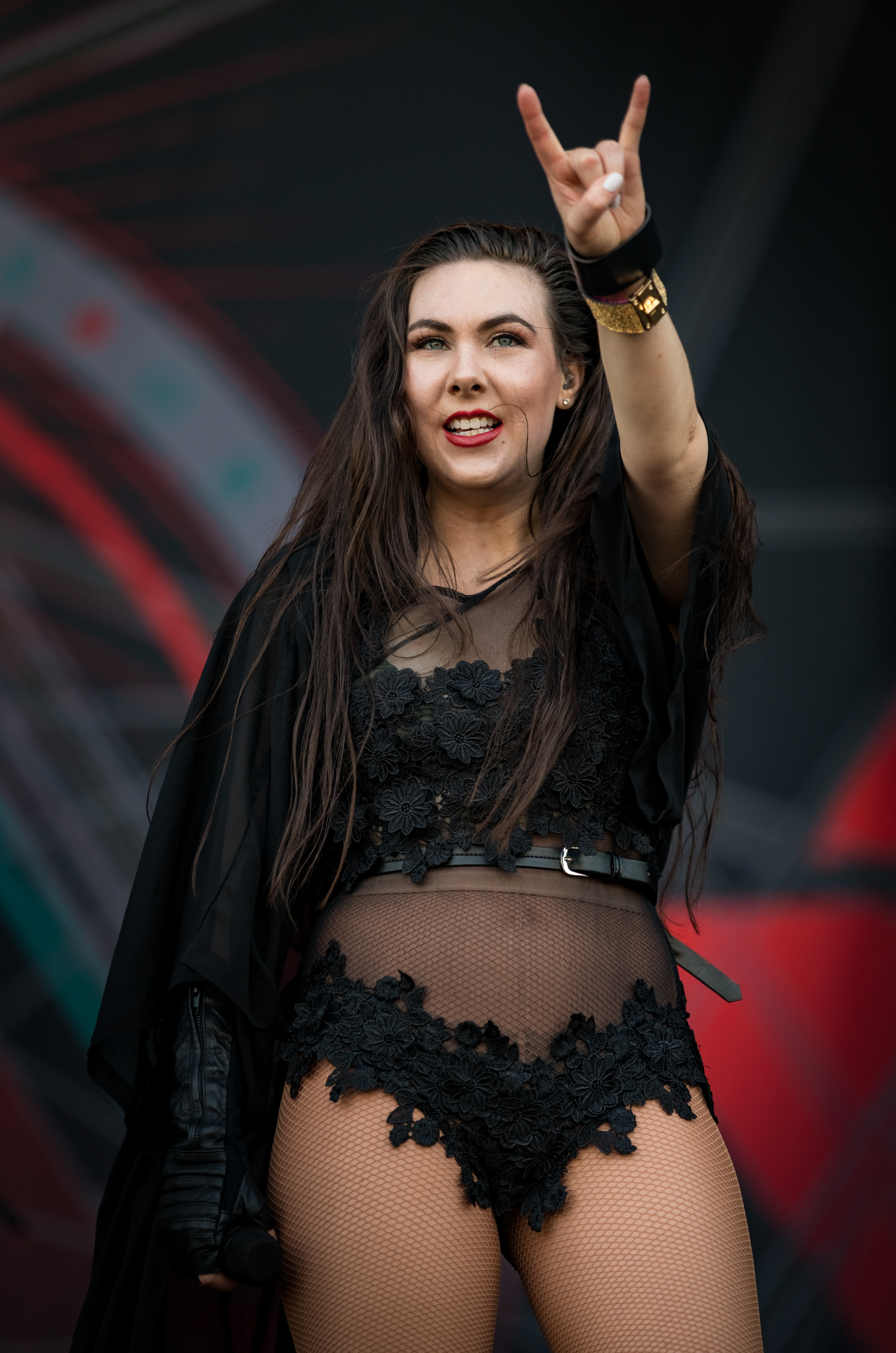
Elize Ryd during Wacken Open Air in 2018

== S ==
- Loret Sadiku, footballer
- Stig Sjölin, Olympic boxer
- Allan Svensson, actor
- Eva-Britt Svensson, former Member of the European Parliament
- Michael Svensson, footballer
- Freddy Söderberg, footballer

== T ==
- Mattias Tedenby, ice hockey player
- Anna Tenje, minister for social security
- Jonas Thern, football manager and former professional player
- Simon Thern, footballer
- Theresa Traore Dahlberg, film director and screenwriter

== Ö ==
- Bernt Östh, former Swedish Armed Forces officer

== See also ==
- Category:People from Värnamo Municipality
