= Lennart Daléus =

Swedish politician

- Lennart Daléus on 1998 election poster for the Centre Party. The text means "This is Lennart."

Personal details
- Born: 25 June 1946 (age 79) Stockholm, Sweden
- Occupation: Politician

Lennart Daléus (born 25 June 1946) is a Swedish politician, who was the leader of the Swedish Centre Party from 1998 to 2001.

Born in Stockholm, Daléus was the leader of the Option 3 campaign for the 1980 referendum on nuclear power in Sweden. Following his stint as Centre Party leader, he was the general secretary of Greenpeace Sweden and the CEO of Greenpeace Scandinavia from 2002 until August 2008. In 2006 he disclosed that he was no longer a member of the Centre Party, as he did not believe that his work for Greenpeace was congruent with being active in a political party. He also criticised the party for its decreased interest in environmental issues.

Party political offices
Preceded by Olof Johansson	Chairman of the Centre Party of Sweden; 1998–2001	Succeeded by Maud Olofsson
