= Hans-Göran Johansson =

Swedish politician (born 1958)

Magnus Hans-Göran Johansson (born 17 January 1958 in Värnamo Municipality, Jönköping) is a Swedish Centre Party politician who served as Mayor of Värnamo Municipality from 2009 to 2021.

He is the father of Annie Lööf, the former leader of the Centre Party and the former Minister for Enterprise 2011 to 2014. He is a police officer by profession.

Political offices
Preceded by Maria Leifland	Värnamo; 2008–2021	Succeeded by Mikael Karlsson
