= Maud Olofsson =

Swedish politician (born 1955)

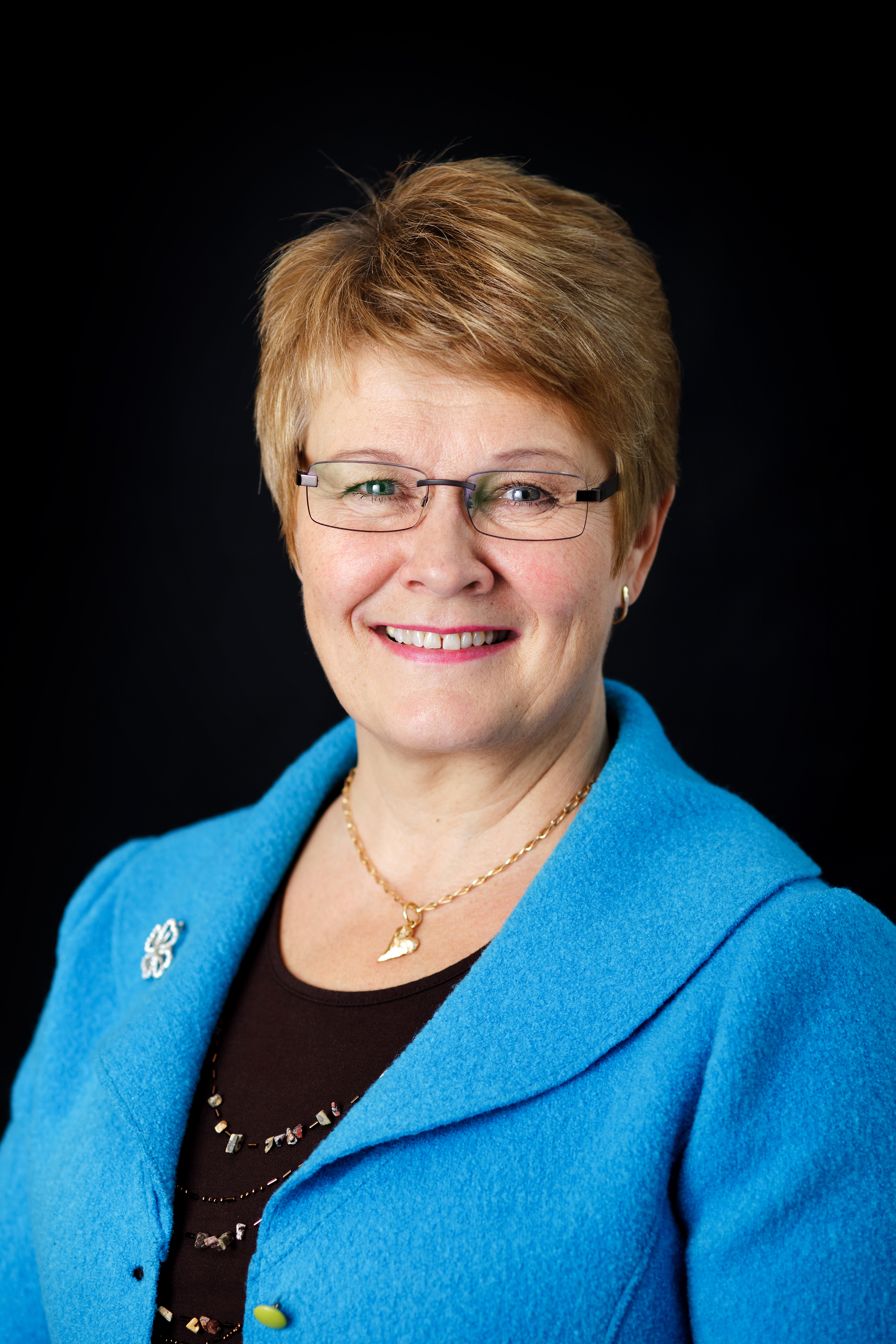
- Olofsson in 2011

Minister for Enterprise and Energy
- In office 6 October 2006 – 29 September 2011
- Prime Minister: Fredrik Reinfeldt
- Preceded by: Thomas Östros
- Succeeded by: Annie Lööf

Deputy Prime Minister of Sweden
- In office 6 October 2006 – 5 October 2010
- Prime Minister: Fredrik Reinfeldt
- Preceded by: Bosse Ringholm
- Succeeded by: Jan Björklund

Chairperson of the Centre Party
- In office 19 March 2001 – 23 September 2011
- Preceded by: Lennart Daléus
- Succeeded by: Annie Lööf

Personal details
- Born: 9 August 1955 (age 71) Örnsköldsvik, Sweden
- Party: Centre Party
- Spouse: Rolf Olofsson

Maud Elisabeth Olofsson (born Olsson, 9 August 1955) is a Swedish former politician who was the leader of the Swedish Centre Party from 2001 to 2011, Minister for Enterprise and Energy from 2006 to 2011 and Deputy Prime Minister of Sweden from 2006 to 2010. She was a member of the Riksdag from 2002 to 2011.

== Biography ==
Maud Olofsson was born in Arnäsvall, and grew up in Högbyn, in Örnsköldsvik Municipality, Västernorrland. She started her political career as an ombudsman of the youth organisation of the Centre Party in 1974, and served as a member of the local council in Luleå from 1976. From 1978 to 1981 she held the same job with the party. From 1992 to 1994, during the Carl Bildt centre-right government, she worked as Special Adviser to Minister Börje Hörnlund at the Department of Labour. From 1996 she has been a member of the Centre Party board. From 1997 to 2001 she worked as Managing Director for the Rural Economy and Agricultural Societies (Hushållningssällskapet) in Västerbotten. She was elected Party Leader on 19 March 2001, succeeding Lennart Daléus. After the 2002 election, the Centre Party's first electoral upturn since 1973 was attributed to the "Maud effect."

Olofsson's political standpoint could be seen as a traditional Centre Party position, with an emphasis on rural Sweden and the survival of rural communities, combined with centre-right economic policies. It was however a remarkable new feature in the history of the Centre Party, when Olofsson characterized her party's ideology as Social Liberalism. Although the Centre Party in history has sometimes cooperated with the governing Social Democrats, under Olofsson the party opted for a clear oppositional role, strengthening its alliance with the Liberals, the Christian Democrats and the Moderate Party.

Olofsson modernised the party, making it more open to the European Union and market liberalism. She was involved in the construction of the right-wing coalition Alliansen.

Following its victory in the elections in 2006, this alliance was able to form a new government under Fredrik Reinfeldt. Olofsson was appointed Deputy Prime Minister and Minister for Enterprise and Energy.

Olofsson announced her intent to step down as party leader on 17 June 2011 and was succeeded by Annie Lööf on 23 September 2011. Following her retirement, she faced criticism after it was revealed that the Swedish state-owned energy company Vattenfall had paid too much for Dutch energy company Nuon in 2009 when she was the responsible minister.

== Awards ==
- Grand Decoration of Honour in Gold with Sash for Services to the Republic of Austria (2007)

== Bibliography ==
- Rapport från kvinnoprojektet: Robertsfors kvinnor mot år 2000 (1992)
- Min dröm för Sverige (2006)
- Ett land av friherrinnor : mina rötter, värderingar och drömmar för Sverige (2010)
- Jag är den jag är (2014)

Party political offices
Preceded by Lennart Daléus	Chairman of the Centre Party; 2001–2011	Succeeded by Annie Lööf
Political offices
Preceded by Bosse Ringholm	Deputy Prime Minister of Sweden; 2006–2010	Succeeded by Jan Björklund
Preceded by Thomas Östros	Minister for Enterprise and Energy; 2006–2011	Succeeded by Annie Lööf
