= Alliance (Sweden) =

Swedish political alliance (2004–2019)

The Alliance Alliansen
- Moderate: Fredrik Reinfeldt (2004–2015); Anna Kinberg Batra (2015–2017); Ulf Kristersson (2017–2019)
- Centre: Maud Olofsson (2004–2011); Annie Lööf (2011–2019)
- Christian Democrats: Göran Hägglund (2004–2015); Ebba Busch (2015–2019)
- Liberals: Lars Leijonborg (2004–2007); Jan Björklund (2007–2019)
- Founded: 31 August 2004
- Dissolved: 11 January 2019
- Ideology: Liberalism (C/L); Conservatism (KD); Liberal conservatism (M)
- Political position: Centre-right
- Colors: Orange
- Parliament: 178 / 349 (2006) 173 / 349 (2010) 141 / 349 (2014) 143 / 349 (2018)

Website
- www.alliansen.se

The Alliance (Swedish: Alliansen; 2004–2010 the Alliance for Sweden, Swedish: Allians för Sverige) was a centre-right liberal-conservative political alliance in Sweden. The Alliance consisted of the four centre-right political parties in the Riksdag: the Moderate Party, the Liberal People's Party, the Christian Democrats, and the Centre Party. The Alliance was formed while in opposition, and later achieved a majority government in the 2006 general election and a minority government in the 2010 general election, governing Sweden from 2006 to 2014 with Fredrik Reinfeldt of the Moderate Party serving as Prime Minister. The Alliance was co-chaired by every component party's individual leaders.

After defeat in the 2014 general election, the Moderate Party's parliamentary group leader Anna Kinberg Batra announced to the Riksdag that the Alliance "would operate in opposition". On 11 January 2019, during the 2018–2019 Swedish government formation, the Centre Party and Liberals agreed to tolerate the re-election as Prime Minister of Social Democratic incumbent Stefan Löfven. Moderate Party leader Ulf Kristersson and Christian Democrat leader Ebba Busch denounced the agreement, with Busch calling the Alliance "a closed chapter".

== Members ==
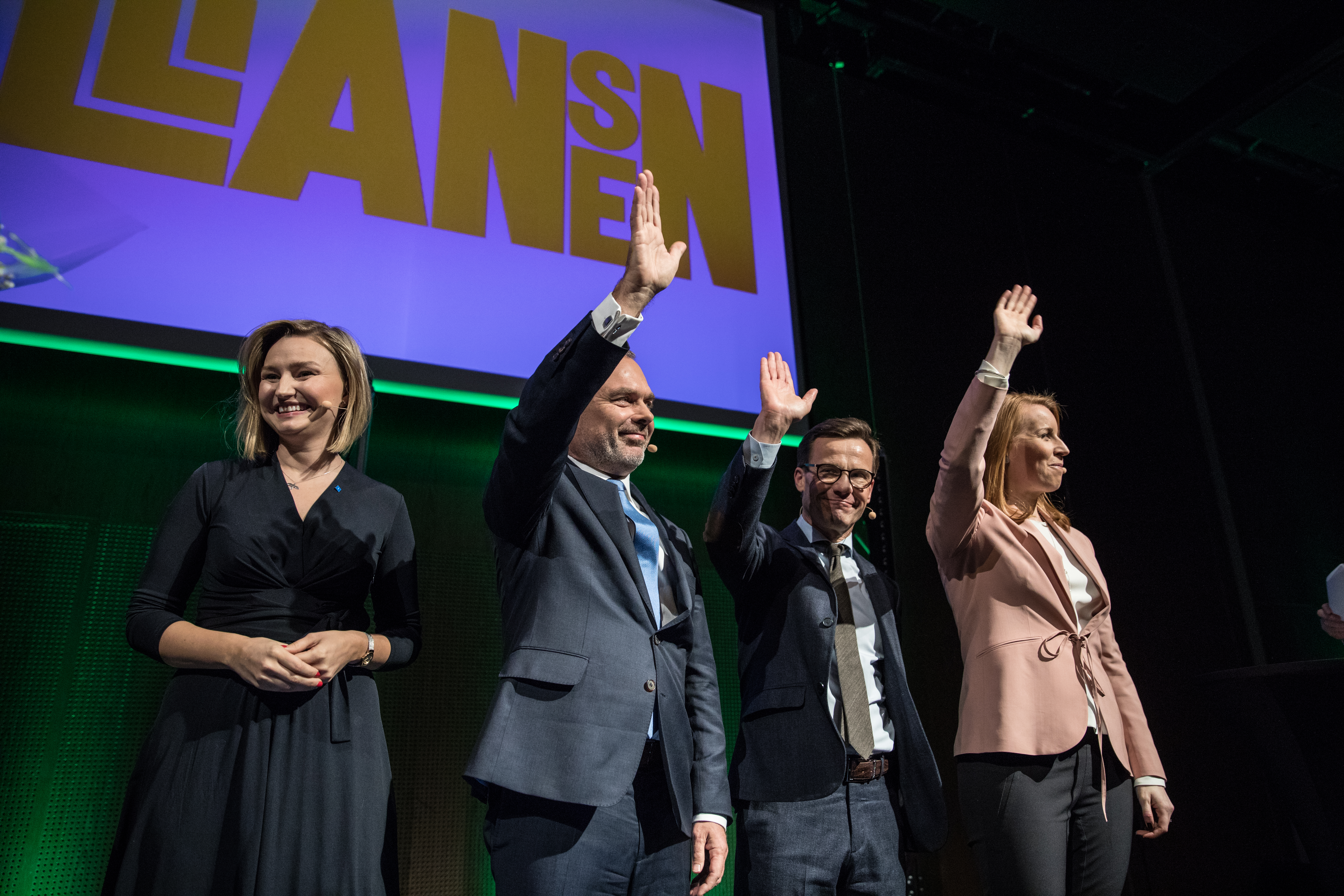
Four leaders together

The Alliance consisted of the four centre-right (Swedish: borgerlig, lit. 'bourgeois') parties in the Riksdag (Sweden's parliament). The members were:

- The Moderate Party (M), a liberal conservative party.
- The Centre Party (C), a liberal, former agrarian party.
- The Christian Democrats (KD), a Christian democratic party.
- The Liberals (L, formerly the Liberal People's Party), a liberal party.

== History ==
Swedish politics had been dominated by the Social Democratic Party for over 70 years. They had been in government for all but nine years since 1932 (summer of 1936, 1976–1982, 1991–1994). The opposition parties decided that this was partly because they did not present a clear and viable alternative government. At a 2004 meeting held in the Centre Party leader Maud Olofsson's home in the village of Högfors in Västerbotten, the four centre-right leaders at the time; Göran Hägglund (KD), Lars Leijonborg (L), Maud Olofsson (C) and Fredrik Reinfeldt (M) decided to form the political cooperation that would become The Alliance. The meeting ended on 31 August 2004 with the presentation of a joint declaration outlining the principles under which the four parties intended to fight the election. A year later a similar meeting was held at Christian Democrat leader Göran Hägglund's home in Bankeryd, resulting in the affirmation of the alliance and another declaration.

== Aims and policies ==
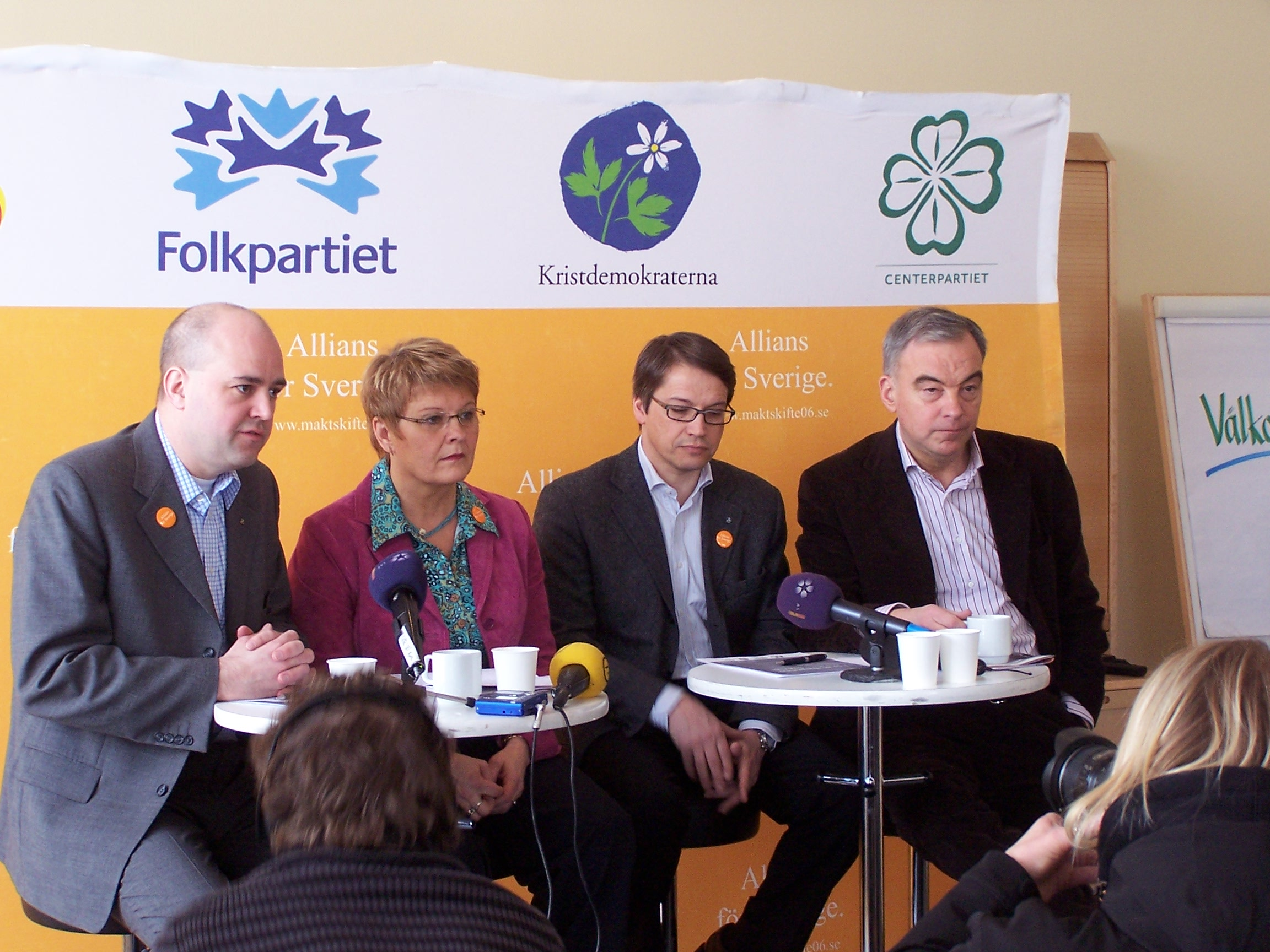
Alliance for Sweden's press conference in Sundsvall during the bus tour of 6–7 March 2006. From left to right: Reinfeldt, Olofsson, Hägglund and Leijonborg.

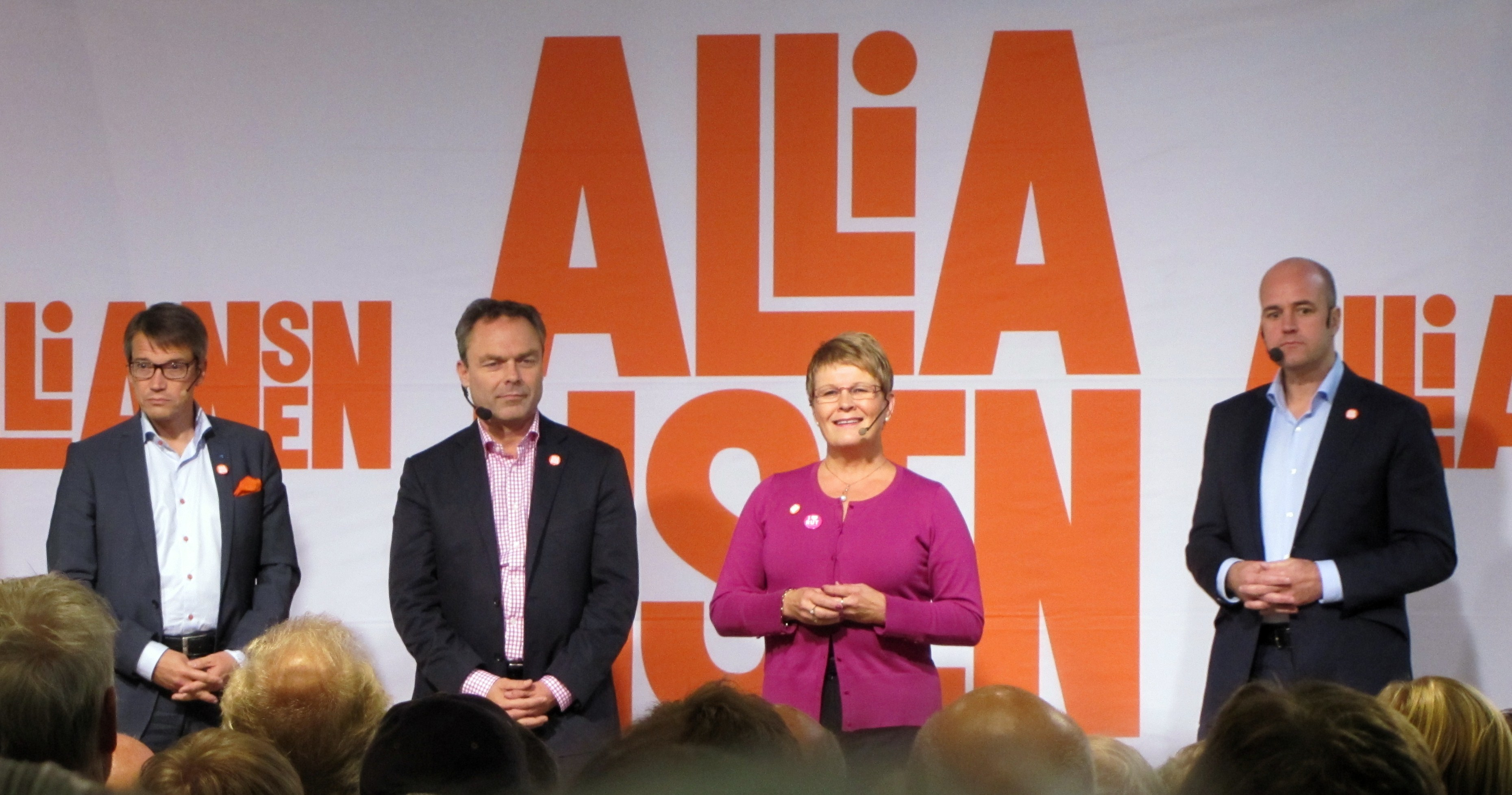
The Alliance the day before the 2010 election. From left to right: Hägglund, Björklund, Olofsson and Reinfeldt

The centre-right Alliance for Sweden aimed to win a majority of seats in the 2006 Riksdag elections and to form a coalition government.

In order to do this, the member parties decided to issue common policy statements and to draft a joint election manifesto. Each individual party still had its own manifesto and policies, but these would build up from common proposals in the Alliance's joint proposals. The Alliance had policy working groups for six areas: economic policy, education policy, foreign policy, the welfare state, employment and business policy, and policing. These were not set according to party size, but with one senior politician (often an MP) and one staff per party, and following the idea that "everybody contributes and everybody gains".

An example of this policy cooperation was the budget proposal that the Alliance parties put forward on 2 October 2005. The core proposal was a tax cut of 49 billion Swedish kronor, which is 1.9% of GDP and 3.3% of the total income of the public sector in 2005. Each individual party also proposed its own policies in addition. For example, the Liberals wanted to spend 1bn kronor extra on tertiary education and the Christian Democrats want to have more benefits and tax deductions for families.

On 14 June 2006, Alliance for Sweden agreed on a common energy policy which would apply over the next parliamentary term (2006–2010), and included a promise not to shut down any more nuclear reactors during that period (Barsebäck 2 was shut down in 2005). The proposal was that no more reactors were to be built, that the nuclear phase-out law would be repealed and that all forms of energy research would be legal and able to receive state grants (research on nuclear power is currently forbidden in Sweden). An Alliance government would also grant any applications to increase the output of the existing plants, provided that it would be safe to do so. This has been hailed as a historic step, as disagreement over nuclear power has long plagued the centre-right in Sweden: the Centre Party opposes nuclear power, the Moderates and Christian Democrats support its continuing operation while the Liberals want to build more reactors. Some doubts were raised about the long-term survival of this compromise, as neither the Centre Party nor the Liberals have changed their fundamental positions on nuclear power.

On 5 July 2006, during the politics week at Almedalen on Gotland, the Alliance parties announced a plan to abolish property tax. Their agreement promised to freeze taxable values at the current level (so that the revaluation that was being carried out would not apply), and to reduce the rate of tax on apartments from 0.5% to 0.4% of their taxable value. A ceiling of 5,000 kronor would also be imposed on the taxation of the value of a house's plot. The parties also agreed on the abolition of the tax and its replacement with a municipal charge independent of the value of the property; this reform was planned to be carried out in 2008. Property tax is estimated to bring in 28.1 billion kronor in 2006, rising to 30.2bn in 2007 and 32.2bn in 2008 (as taxable values rise). The first stage of the Alliance's plan (freezing property values, capping the tax on land value and reducing the rate for apartments) is estimated to cost around 4-5 billion kronor. The financing of this was to be revealed in the Alliance's manifesto in August 2006.

Alliance for Sweden released its election manifesto, entitled More people in work - more to share (Swedish: Fler i arbete - mer att dela på), on 23 August 2006.

The result of the election was clear enough on election night for Moderate Party leader Fredrik Reinfeldt to declare himself the victor and for Göran Persson to announce his resignation as Prime Minister and as leader of the Social Democratic Party. The four centre-right parties of Alliance for Sweden formed a government with Fredrik Reinfeldt as Prime Minister, which was presented to the Riksdag on 6 October.

== In government (2006–2014) ==
Minister for Finance Anders Borg presented the government's first budget on 16 October 2006. The budget contains many of the proposals that were prominent in the Alliance's election campaign: both the job deduction in the income tax, which will also be larger for old people to encourage them to remain in the labour market, and the "fresh start jobs" with reduced payroll tax for companies employing people who have been unemployed for more than a year will come into effect from 1 January 2007. Tax reductions for companies hiring young people and for domestic services are to come into effect on 1 July. The tax reductions announced in the budget total 42 billion Swedish kronor, of which the income tax deduction is 38.7 billion. Other changes include the ending of employers' co-financing of sickness benefit after the second week, reduction of unemployment benefits and considerably raised fees to unemployment funds, resulting in a substantial decline in union density and density of unemployment funds. Unemployment benefit would remain 80% of previous pay for 200 days then drop to 70%. Benefit would be payable for a maximum of 300 days, or 450 if the recipient has children.

== List of party leaders ==
Year	Moderate Party	Centre Party	Liberals	Christian Democrats
2004	Fredrik Reinfeldt; Leader 2003–2015; Prime Minister 2006–2014	Maud Olofsson; Leader 2001–2011; Deputy Prime Minister 2006–2010; Minister for Enterprise 2006–2011	Lars Leijonborg; Leader 1997–2007; Minister for Education 2006–2007	Göran Hägglund; Leader 2004–2015; Minister for Health and Social Affairs 2006–2014
2005	Fredrik Reinfeldt; Leader 2003–2015; Prime Minister 2006–2014	Maud Olofsson; Leader 2001–2011; Deputy Prime Minister 2006–2010; Minister for Enterprise 2006–2011	Lars Leijonborg; Leader 1997–2007; Minister for Education 2006–2007	Göran Hägglund; Leader 2004–2015; Minister for Health and Social Affairs 2006–2014
2006	Fredrik Reinfeldt; Leader 2003–2015; Prime Minister 2006–2014	Maud Olofsson; Leader 2001–2011; Deputy Prime Minister 2006–2010; Minister for Enterprise 2006–2011	Lars Leijonborg; Leader 1997–2007; Minister for Education 2006–2007	Göran Hägglund; Leader 2004–2015; Minister for Health and Social Affairs 2006–2014
2007	Fredrik Reinfeldt; Leader 2003–2015; Prime Minister 2006–2014	Maud Olofsson; Leader 2001–2011; Deputy Prime Minister 2006–2010; Minister for Enterprise 2006–2011	Jan Björklund; Leader 7 September 2007 – 28 June 2019; Minister for School 2006–2007; Minister for Education 2007–2014; Deputy Prime Minister 2010–2014	Göran Hägglund; Leader 2004–2015; Minister for Health and Social Affairs 2006–2014
2008	Fredrik Reinfeldt; Leader 2003–2015; Prime Minister 2006–2014	Maud Olofsson; Leader 2001–2011; Deputy Prime Minister 2006–2010; Minister for Enterprise 2006–2011	Jan Björklund; Leader 7 September 2007 – 28 June 2019; Minister for School 2006–2007; Minister for Education 2007–2014; Deputy Prime Minister 2010–2014	Göran Hägglund; Leader 2004–2015; Minister for Health and Social Affairs 2006–2014
2009	Fredrik Reinfeldt; Leader 2003–2015; Prime Minister 2006–2014	Maud Olofsson; Leader 2001–2011; Deputy Prime Minister 2006–2010; Minister for Enterprise 2006–2011	Jan Björklund; Leader 7 September 2007 – 28 June 2019; Minister for School 2006–2007; Minister for Education 2007–2014; Deputy Prime Minister 2010–2014	Göran Hägglund; Leader 2004–2015; Minister for Health and Social Affairs 2006–2014
2010	Fredrik Reinfeldt; Leader 2003–2015; Prime Minister 2006–2014	Maud Olofsson; Leader 2001–2011; Deputy Prime Minister 2006–2010; Minister for Enterprise 2006–2011	Jan Björklund; Leader 7 September 2007 – 28 June 2019; Minister for School 2006–2007; Minister for Education 2007–2014; Deputy Prime Minister 2010–2014	Göran Hägglund; Leader 2004–2015; Minister for Health and Social Affairs 2006–2014
2011	Fredrik Reinfeldt; Leader 2003–2015; Prime Minister 2006–2014	Annie Lööf; Leader 23 September 2011 – 2 February 2023; Minister for Enterprise and Regional Affairs 2011–2014	Jan Björklund; Leader 7 September 2007 – 28 June 2019; Minister for School 2006–2007; Minister for Education 2007–2014; Deputy Prime Minister 2010–2014	Göran Hägglund; Leader 2004–2015; Minister for Health and Social Affairs 2006–2014
2012	Fredrik Reinfeldt; Leader 2003–2015; Prime Minister 2006–2014	Annie Lööf; Leader 23 September 2011 – 2 February 2023; Minister for Enterprise and Regional Affairs 2011–2014	Jan Björklund; Leader 7 September 2007 – 28 June 2019; Minister for School 2006–2007; Minister for Education 2007–2014; Deputy Prime Minister 2010–2014	Göran Hägglund; Leader 2004–2015; Minister for Health and Social Affairs 2006–2014
2013	Fredrik Reinfeldt; Leader 2003–2015; Prime Minister 2006–2014	Annie Lööf; Leader 23 September 2011 – 2 February 2023; Minister for Enterprise and Regional Affairs 2011–2014	Jan Björklund; Leader 7 September 2007 – 28 June 2019; Minister for School 2006–2007; Minister for Education 2007–2014; Deputy Prime Minister 2010–2014	Göran Hägglund; Leader 2004–2015; Minister for Health and Social Affairs 2006–2014
2014	Fredrik Reinfeldt; Leader 2003–2015; Prime Minister 2006–2014	Annie Lööf; Leader 23 September 2011 – 2 February 2023; Minister for Enterprise and Regional Affairs 2011–2014	Jan Björklund; Leader 7 September 2007 – 28 June 2019; Minister for School 2006–2007; Minister for Education 2007–2014; Deputy Prime Minister 2010–2014	Göran Hägglund; Leader 2004–2015; Minister for Health and Social Affairs 2006–2014
2015	Fredrik Reinfeldt; Leader 2003–2015; Prime Minister 2006–2014	Annie Lööf; Leader 23 September 2011 – 2 February 2023; Minister for Enterprise and Regional Affairs 2011–2014	Jan Björklund; Leader 7 September 2007 – 28 June 2019; Minister for School 2006–2007; Minister for Education 2007–2014; Deputy Prime Minister 2010–2014	Göran Hägglund; Leader 2004–2015; Minister for Health and Social Affairs 2006–2014
2015	Anna Kinberg Batra; Leader 10 January 2015 – 1 October 2017	Annie Lööf; Leader 23 September 2011 – 2 February 2023; Minister for Enterprise and Regional Affairs 2011–2014	Jan Björklund; Leader 7 September 2007 – 28 June 2019; Minister for School 2006–2007; Minister for Education 2007–2014; Deputy Prime Minister 2010–2014	Ebba Busch; Leader 25 April 2015 – present
2016	Anna Kinberg Batra; Leader 10 January 2015 – 1 October 2017	Annie Lööf; Leader 23 September 2011 – 2 February 2023; Minister for Enterprise and Regional Affairs 2011–2014	Jan Björklund; Leader 7 September 2007 – 28 June 2019; Minister for School 2006–2007; Minister for Education 2007–2014; Deputy Prime Minister 2010–2014	Ebba Busch; Leader 25 April 2015 – present
2017	Anna Kinberg Batra; Leader 10 January 2015 – 1 October 2017	Annie Lööf; Leader 23 September 2011 – 2 February 2023; Minister for Enterprise and Regional Affairs 2011–2014	Jan Björklund; Leader 7 September 2007 – 28 June 2019; Minister for School 2006–2007; Minister for Education 2007–2014; Deputy Prime Minister 2010–2014	Ebba Busch; Leader 25 April 2015 – present
2017	Ulf Kristersson; Leader 1 October 2017 – present	Annie Lööf; Leader 23 September 2011 – 2 February 2023; Minister for Enterprise and Regional Affairs 2011–2014	Jan Björklund; Leader 7 September 2007 – 28 June 2019; Minister for School 2006–2007; Minister for Education 2007–2014; Deputy Prime Minister 2010–2014	Ebba Busch; Leader 25 April 2015 – present
2018	Ulf Kristersson; Leader 1 October 2017 – present	Annie Lööf; Leader 23 September 2011 – 2 February 2023; Minister for Enterprise and Regional Affairs 2011–2014	Jan Björklund; Leader 7 September 2007 – 28 June 2019; Minister for School 2006–2007; Minister for Education 2007–2014; Deputy Prime Minister 2010–2014	Ebba Busch; Leader 25 April 2015 – present

== Electoral history ==
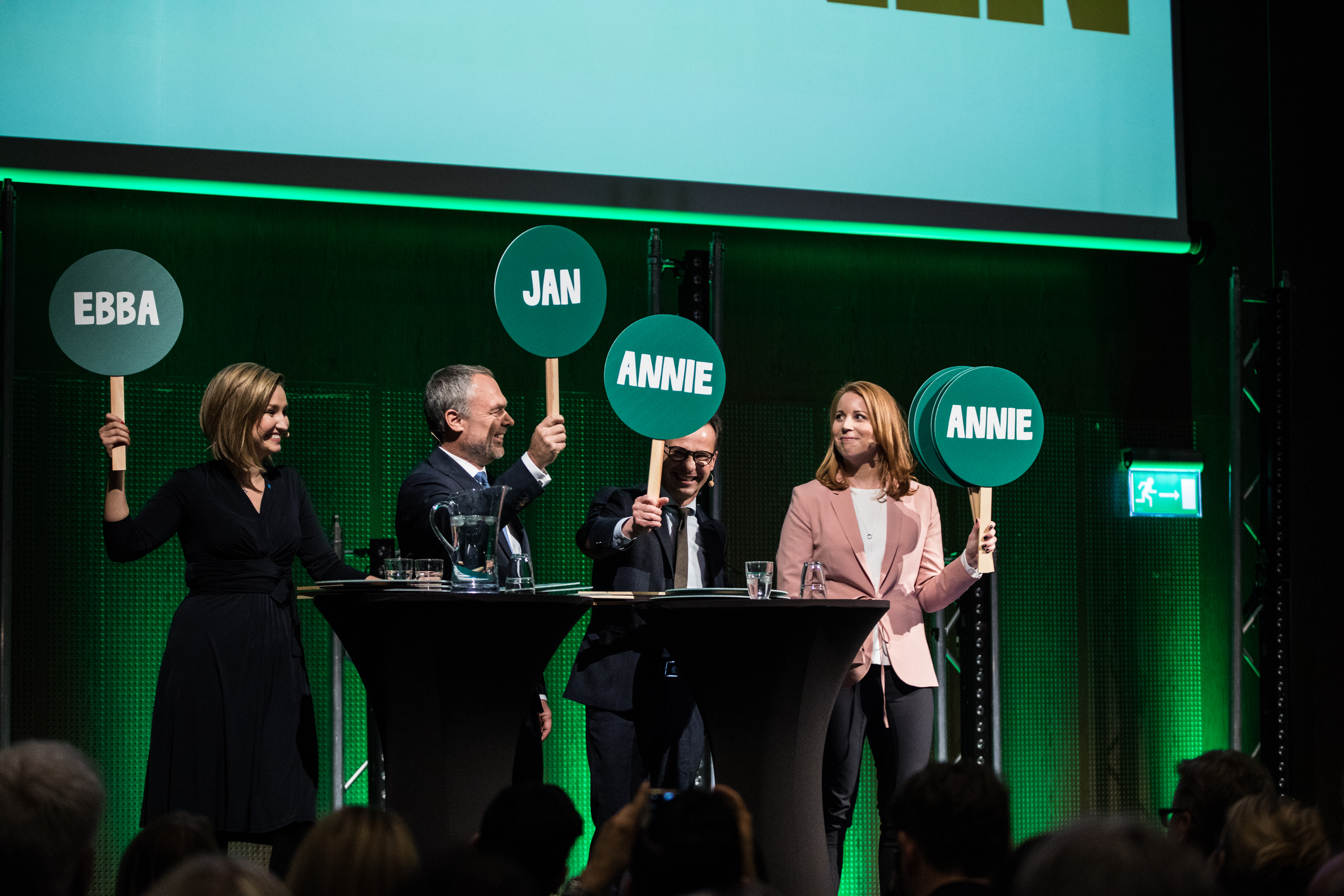
Four leaders in February 2018.

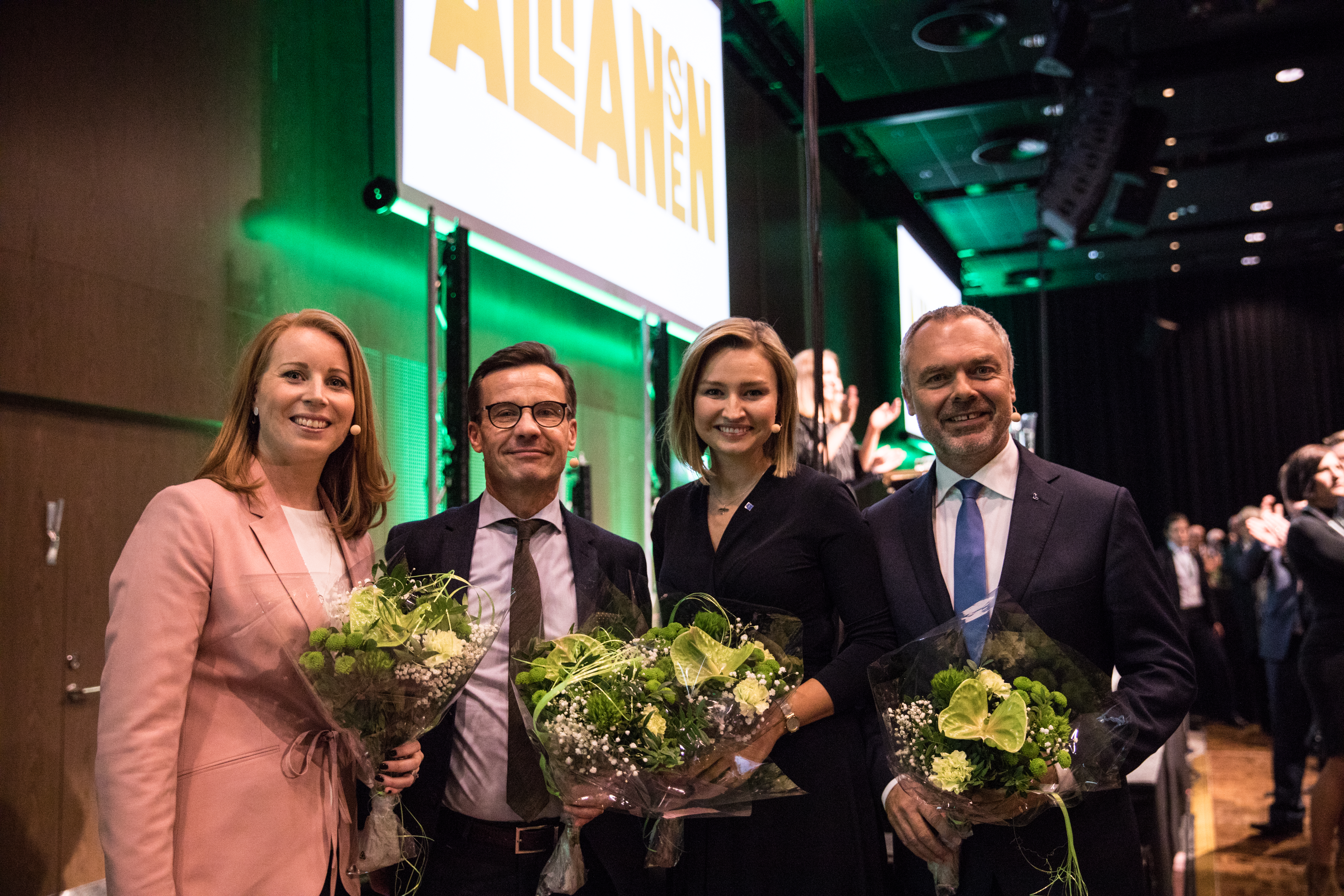
Four leaders in February 2018.

The parties had previously formed a centre-right minority coalition government in 1991 with the support of the right-wing populist party New Democracy. After the coalition was defeated in the 1994 election, the Centre-Right Parties coalition was dissolved but the centre-right opposition parties continued to work together. In 2004, the four parties which formed the Centre-Right Parties in 1991, the Moderate Party, Centre Party, Liberal People's Party and Christian Democrats wanted to collaborate again, so they founded The Alliance as a new coalition of the centre-right parties.

=== Parliament (Riksdag) ===
Election	# of overall seats won	+/-	Party	Government	Party leaders
2006	178 / 349	▲20	Alliance	in majority government coalition	—N/a
2006	97 / 349	▲42	Moderate	in majority government coalition	Fredrik Reinfeldt
2006	29 / 349	▲7	Centre	in majority government coalition	Maud Olofsson
2006	28 / 349	▼20	Liberal	in majority government coalition	Lars Leijonborg (2006–2007) Jan Björklund (2007–2010)
2006	24 / 349	▼9	Christian Democrats	in majority government coalition	Göran Hägglund
2010	173 / 349	▼5	Alliance	in minority government coalition	—N/a
2010	107 / 349	▲10	Moderate	in minority government coalition	Fredrik Reinfeldt
2010	24 / 349	▼4	Liberal	in minority government coalition	Jan Björklund
2010	23 / 349	▼6	Centre	in minority government coalition	Maud Olofsson (2010–2011) Annie Lööf (2011–2014)
2010	19 / 349	▼5	Christian Democrats	in minority government coalition	Göran Hägglund
2014	141 / 349	▼32	Alliance	in opposition	—N/a
2014	84 / 349	▼23	Moderate	in opposition	Fredrik Reinfeldt (2014–2015) Anna Kinberg Batra (2015–2017) Ulf Kristersson (2017–2018)
2014	22 / 349	▼1	Centre	in opposition	Annie Lööf
2014	19 / 349	▼5	Liberal	in opposition	Jan Björklund
2014	16 / 349	▼3	Christian Democrats	in opposition	Göran Hägglund (2014–2015) Ebba Busch (2015–2018)
2018	143 / 349	▲2	Alliance	Dissolved on 11 January 2019	—N/a
2018	70 / 349	▼14	Moderate	in opposition	Ulf Kristersson
2018	31 / 349	▲9	Centre	Supporting minority government	Annie Lööf
2018	22 / 349	▲6	Christian Democrats	in opposition	Ebba Busch
2018	20 / 349	▲1	Liberal	Supporting minority government	Jan Björklund (2018–2019) Nyamko Sabuni (2019–2022) Johan Pehrson (2022)

=== European Parliament ===
Election	# of overall seats won	+/-	Party
2009 (Note: From December 2011 Sweden was allocated 2 more seats in the European Parliament.)	9 / 18	▲1	Alliance
2009	9 / 20	▲1	Alliance
2014	7 / 20	▼2	Alliance

== See also ==
- Red-Greens – left-wing to centre-left coalition between the Left Party, Social Democrats, and Green Party
- Tidö Agreement – 2022 agreement which formed a centre-right to far-right bloc of the Liberals, Moderate Party, Christian Democrats, and Sweden Democrats; not including the Centre Party
