= Annie Lööf =

Swedish politician and lawyer (born 1983)

Annie Lööf C
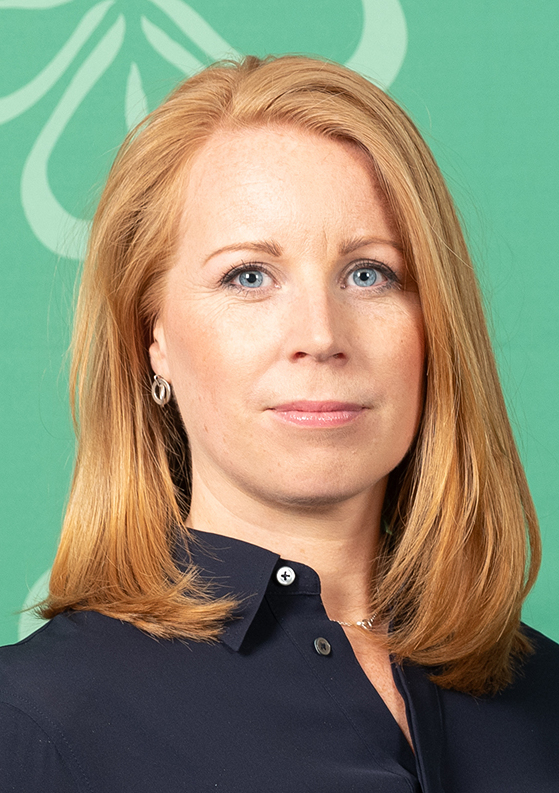
- Lööf in April 2019

Leader of the Centre Party
- In office 23 September 2011 – 2 February 2023
- Party secretary: Michael Arthursson
- Preceded by: Maud Olofsson
- Succeeded by: Muharrem Demirok

Minister for Enterprise
- In office 29 September 2011 – 3 October 2014
- Prime Minister: Fredrik Reinfeldt
- Preceded by: Maud Olofsson
- Succeeded by: Mikael Damberg

Member of the Riksdag
- In office 17 September 2006 – 19 February 2023
- Constituency: Jönköping County

Personal details
- Born: Annie Marie Therése Johansson; 16 July 1983 (age 43) Värnamo, Sweden
- Party: Centre
- Spouse: Carl-Johan Lööf (m. 2011)
- Children: 2
- Parent: Hans-Göran Johansson (father)
- Education: Lund University (LL.M.)
- Occupation: Politician
- Website: annieloof.se

Annie Marie Therése Lööf (née Johansson, [ˈǎnːɪ maˈriː tɛˈreːs ˈløːv ˈjûːanˌsɔn]; born 16 July 1983) is a Swedish former politician and lawyer. She was Member of the Riksdag, representing her home constituency of Jönköping County, from 2006 to 2023, and leader of the Centre Party from September 2011 to February 2023. Lööf served as Minister for Enterprise from 2011 to 2014, in the Reinfeldt Cabinet.

== Early life and career ==
Annie Lööf was born and raised in the small village of Maramö, near Värnamo. During her last year at Finnvedens Secondary School in Värnamo, where she studied social sciences, she developed an interest in politics.

In her youth, she was a soccer goalkeeper, playing for IFK Värnamo's women's team.

== Political career ==
=== Early beginnings ===
At the end of 2001 Lööf joined the Centre Party. During the 2002 general election she was employed as an election agent for the party's youth organization (CUF) in Jönköping County and in the same year she won a Dag Hammarskjöld Scholarship, which gave her the chance to immerse herself in international peace and environmental issues at the UN Headquarters in New York. After the election she enrolled to study law at Lund University and was awarded a professional degree in law (LL.M.) in August 2011.

=== Member of Parliament, 2006–2023 ===
In the general election of 2006 Lööf was elected to the Riksdag, being at that time the youngest member of the legislature.

In January 2007, together with her colleague Fredrick Federley, Lööf initiated the Liberal Group, a network of liberal-minded people both inside and outside the Riksdag. She has also been the vice president of CUF. For several years she served on the board of the Nordic Centre Youth Federation, Scandinavia's second largest youth organization.

In 2008 Lööf was awarded the "Young European Leadership Program" grant from the United States Embassy.

Before she became a minister and party leader, Annie Lööf was member of the Committee on Finance, the War Delegation and a vicepresident of the Committee on Justice and first Deputy House Leader for the Centre Party's parliamentary group and member of the party's executive board. She has served as a member on several government commissions, including the E-Publicity Committee, the investigation of the police needs of signal intelligence and in the signals intelligence committee, which evaluated the National Defence Radio Establishment activities.

During her two terms, she has been active in municipal politics in Värnamo, as deputy of the City Council from 2002 to 2004, as member of the Citizens' Board from 2002 to 2004, as well as ordinary municipal councillor from 2006 to 2007. Lööf was also elected to the local councils for Värnamo in 2010, but left the mission because of many national commitments. Until 2008 Lööf was a substitute to the Nordic Council's Swedish delegation, and the pre-term in office she worked for the Committee on the Constitution as a member.

After the 2010 general election, Lööf was elected chairman of the National Post-Election Analysis Group the Centre Party appointed. The Analysis Group presented its report in January 2011. The same year she became Spokesperson for Financial and Economic Affairs of her party. On 31 August 2011, the Centre Partys Nomination Commité proposed Annie Lööf as the Party President and on the party's congress in Åre on 23 September she was elected by acclamation.

=== Leader of the Centre Party, 2011–2023 ===
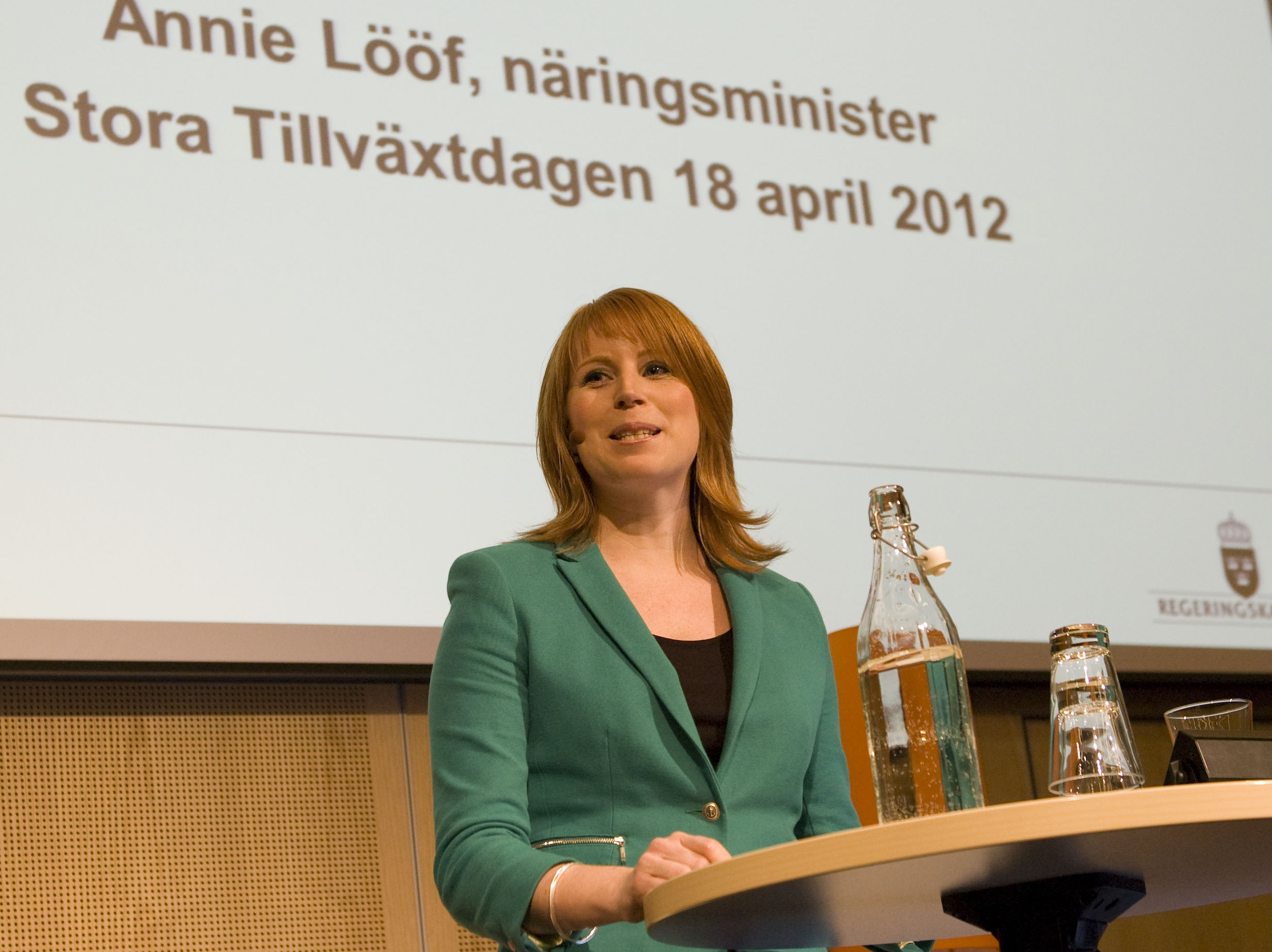
Lööf at the "Stora Tillväxtdagen" (Major Growth Day) in April 2012

Lööf was elected leader and party president on 23 September 2011, succeeding Maud Olofsson, at the party congress in Åre. She thus became the Centre Party's youngest-ever party leader.

On 29 September 2011, Lööf succeeded Maud Olofsson as Minister for Business and Enterprise. She also saw to replace Minister for the Environment Andreas Carlgren with Lena Ek, former MEP, and gave birth for to new cabinet post Minister for IT and Energy who Anna-Karin Hatt (former candidate for the party leadership) was given. The Minister for Rural and Farming Affairs, Eskil Erlandsson kept his seat.

During Almedalsveckan 2012, in her address at the Centre Party gathering, Lööf criticized the government of which she was a part for its inability to keep up the pace of reform that had been a leading part of the Alliance platform in 2006, and urged a revival. "The joint project has lost momentum. Project embers have died down," she said. These points were met with fierce opposition from the other cabinet parties, mainly from the Christian Democrats and the party secretary Acko Ankarberg Johansson. The speech also drew attention because of the caustic review by Social Democrat former minister of culture Marita Ulvskog: "New speechwriter for Annie Lööf? unfortunately didn't help. Credibility none. Would work in Top Model, not in reality" she wrote on Twitter. Ulvskog later apologized for some of the wording.

On 6 August 2012, Lööf dismissed Christina Lugnet, the Director-General of Tillväxtverket, after it had become known that Lugnet's government agency had spent approximately 16 million SEK on mostly internal representation over a brief period of time: banquets, kick-offs, hotel stays for its personnel and conferences. This was out of bounds under Swedish law and by the agency's own rules.

On 8 August, it became known that Lööf used taxpayers' money for a number of restaurant visits, including banquets for her staff. A memo was revealed to have amounted 20 000 SEK. The Centre Party has subsequently repaid these expenses to the treasury, as it was for party activities.

After the parliamentary election in 2014, Lööf's trust figures raised dramatically. In 2017, Annie Lööf had the highest trust figures of any major political party leader in Sweden by Swedish voters.

Following the inconclusive elections in 2018, the speaker of Sweden's parliament Andreas Norlén asked Lööf to explore the possibility of forming a new government. Löof subsequently tried to build support for a broad government which excluded the Sweden Democrats and the Left Party and kept intact the centre-right Alliance, a four-party bloc of which the center is part. She abandoned her bid to form a new government one week later. In January 2019, she eventually led her party to abandon its traditional center-right allies and back Social Democrat leader Stefan Löfven as Prime Minister.

Following the government's defeat in the 2022 general election, in part due to Centre Party losses, Lööf announced her resignation as leader of the Centre Party on 15 September. She was succeeded by Muharrem Demirok on 2 February 2023.

== Other activities ==
- Trilateral Commission, Member of the European Group
- Swedish Agency for Youth and Civil Society, Member of the Advisory Council
- Coompanion, Member of the Board of Directors

== Personal life ==
Lööf is the daughter of Centre Party politician Hans-Göran Johansson, the former Mayor of Värnamo Municipality. On 30 July 2011 Lööf married Carl-Johan Lööf at which point they took his mother's maiden name as surname. On 10 September 2015 she gave birth to a daughter named Ester. She had a second daughter, Saga, on 3 December 2019 who was born prematurely. They live in Nacka, Stockholm.

Honorary titles
| Preceded by Gustav Fridolin | Baby of the House; 2006–2010 | Succeeded by Anton Abele |
Party political offices
| Preceded by Maud Olofsson | Leader of the Swedish Centre Party; 2011–2023 | Succeeded by Muharrem Demirok |
Political offices
| Preceded by Maud Olofsson | Minister for Enterprise; 2011–2014 | Succeeded by Mikael Damberg |
