= Lillemor Arvidsson =

Swedish trade union leader and governor

34th Governor of Gotland
- In office 1998–2004
- Prime Minister: Göran Persson
- Preceded by: Thorsten Andersson
- Succeeded by: Marianne Samuelsson

President of the Swedish Municipal Workers' Union
- In office 1988–1995
- Preceded by: Sigvard Marjasin
- Succeeded by: Ylva Thörn

Personal details
- Born: 1 May 1943 Skara, Sweden
- Died: 23 April 2012 (aged 68) Stockholm, Sweden
- Party: Social Democrats
- Profession: Nurse

Maj Lillemor Arvidsson (1 May 1943 – 23 April 2012) was a Swedish trade union leader and the Governor of Gotland from 1998 to 2004.

Arvidsson trained as a nurse and later worked as a nursing assistant at Uddevalla Hospital. Arvidsson engaged simultaneously in trade union work. In 1972, she was employed by the Swedish Municipal Workers' Union as an academic ombudsman. In 1982, she became ombudsman and in 1983 she became Deputy President.

In June 1988 she was appointed President of the Swedish Municipal Workers' Union. She became the union's first female President. In addition, she became the first female President of any institution in the Swedish Trade Union Confederation (LO). From 1990 to 1991 she was also a member of the executive board of the Swedish Social Democratic Worker's Party.

In 1995, she left her post as President of the Swedish Municipal Workers' Union because of peptic ulcer. She sat on the board of the University of Växjö and was a member of the analysis group of the Estonia disaster.

Arvidsson was appointed Governor of Gotland on 15 January 1998 by the Swedish Government. During her time as governor, she was particularly involved in the issue of transport from the island to the mainland. She left her position as governor on 29 February 2004.

Arvidsson was appointed Chairman of the Swedish National Maritime Museums in 2003 but left office in late 2004.

She died on 23 April 2012 after a short illness.
