= List of governors of Västernorrland County =

Governor of Västernorrland County
- Landshövding i Västernorrlands län
- Coat of arms of Västernorrland County.

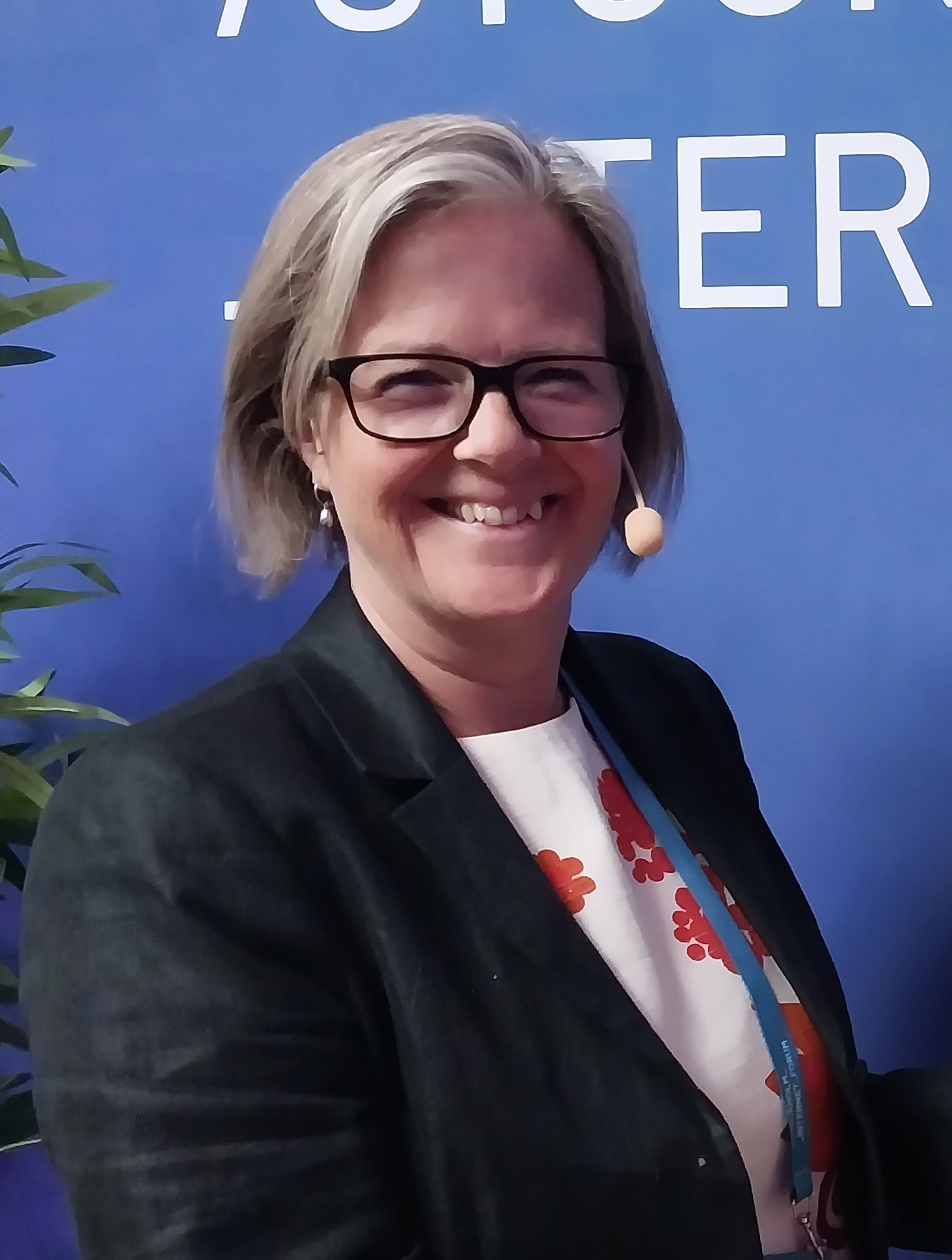
- Incumbent; Carin Jämtin since 1 September 2023
- Västernorrland County Administrative Board
- Residence: The residence in Härnösand, Härnösand
- Appointer: Government of Sweden
- Term length: Six years (Note: The governor is often appointed for a six-year mandate. It can be extended if the person has not reached retirement age.)
- Formation: 1654
- First holder: Erik Larsson Sparre
- Deputy: County Director (Länsrådet)
- Salary: SEK 97,800/month (2017)
- Website: Governor and County Director

This is a list of governors for Västernorrland County of Sweden, from 1658 to present. Västernorrland was created from the briefly existing Härnösand and Hudiksvall Counties in 1654, which in turn had been separated from Norrland County in 1645.

- Erik Larsson Sparre (1654–1655)
- Johan Oxenstierna (1655–1664)
- Gustaf Banér (1664)
- Carl Larsson Sparre (1664–1677)
- Christopher Gyllenstierna (1677)
- Jacob Fleming (1677–1679)
- Göran Sperling (1679–1683)
- Lennart Ribbing (1683–1687)
- Otto Vellingk (1687–1693)
- Carl Gustaf Frölich (1693–1698)
- Malcolm Hamilton af Hageby (1698–1699)
- Axel von Schaar (1699–1702)
- Carl Carlsson Hård af Segerstad (1702–1704)
- Alexander Stromberg (1704–1716)
- Hugo Hamilton (1716–1719)
- Magnus Palmqvist (1719–1727)
- Carl Gustaf Bielke (1727–1739)
- Erik Odelström (1739–1749)
- Axel Johan Gripenhielm (1749–1755)
- Karl Gustaf Cronhiort (1755)
- Mårten Ehrensvan (1755–1757)
- Fredrik Henrik Sparre (1757–1762)
- Per Abraham Örnsköld (1762–1769)
- Germund Abraham Falkengren (1769–1778)
- Johan Nordenfalk (1778)
- Carl Bunge (1778–1796)
- Erik Gustaf Lindencrona (1796–1807)
- Carl von Nieroth (1810–1817)
- Carl Fredrik Aschling (1817–1820)
- Hampus Mörner (1820–1841)
- Fredric Åkerman (1841–1851)
- Sven Vilhelm Gynther (1851–1862)
- Ernst August Weidenhielm (1863–1873)
- Curry Treffenberg (1873–1880)
- Gustaf Ryding (1880–1901)
- Gustaf Rudebeck (1901–1909)
- Fredric Engelbert Bergenholtz (1909–1911)
- Carl Mathias Ström (1911–1918)
- Karl Johan Stenström (1918–1931)
- Anders Victor Benedict Wijkman (1931–1938)
- Nils Löwbeer (1939)
- Arthur Engberg (1940–1944)
- Ragnar Stattin (1944–1953)
- Eric Wesström (1954–1965)
- Hjalmar Nilsson (1965–1971)
- Kurt Nordgren (1971–1974)
- Bertil Löfberg (1975–1989)
- Ingemar Öhrn (1989–1995)
- Börje Hörnlund (1996–2000)
- Gerhard Larsson (2000–2008)
- Bo Källstrand (2008–2014)
- Sten-Olov Altin (2014–2015; acting)
- Gunnar Holmgren (2015–2018)
- Berit Högman (2018–2023)
- Carin Jämtin (2023– )
