= Carin Jämtin =

Swedish civil servant and politician

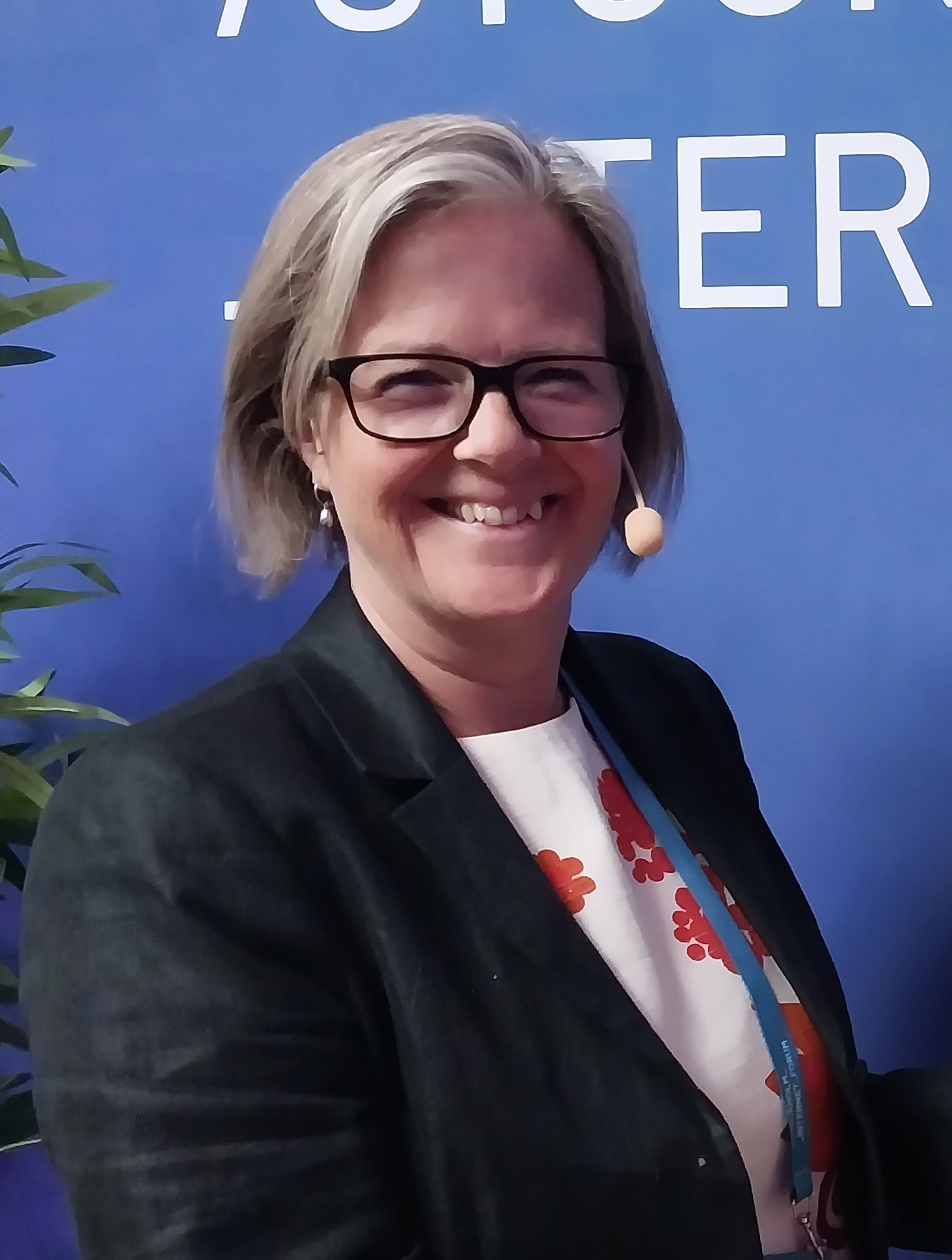
- Carin Jämtin in May 2023

Governor of Västernorrland County
- Incumbent
- Assumed office 1 September 2023
- Monarch: Carl XVI Gustaf
- Prime Minister: Ulf Kristersson
- Preceded by: Berit Högman

Secretary-General of the Swedish Social Democratic Party
- In office 26 March 2011 – 27 August 2016
- Leader: Håkan Juholt; Stefan Löfven
- Preceded by: Ibrahim Baylan
- Succeeded by: Lena Rådström Baastad

Minister for International Development Cooperation
- In office 10 October 2003 – 6 October 2006
- Monarch: Carl XVI Gustaf
- Prime Minister: Göran Persson
- Preceded by: Jan O. Karlsson
- Succeeded by: Gunilla Carlsson

Member of Parliament
- In office 29 September 2014 – 28 May 2017
- Constituency: Stockholm Municipality
- In office 7 October 2006 – 21 December 2006
- Constituency: Stockholm Municipality

Personal details
- Born: 3 August 1964 (age 62) Stockholm, Sweden
- Party: Swedish Social Democratic Party

Carin Jämtin (born 3 August 1964) is a Swedish civil servant and former politician who has served as Governor of Västernorrland County since 1 September 2023.

A member of the Swedish Social Democratic Party, she was Member of Parliament (MP) briefly in 2006 and from 2014 to 2017, representing Stockholm Municipality both times. She served as Minister for International Development Cooperation from 2003 to 2006 under Prime Minister Göran Persson and was Secretary-General of the Swedish Social Democratic Party under party leaders Håkan Juholt and Stefan Löfven from 2011 to 2016. She was Director-General of the Swedish International Development Agency from 2017 to 2023.

== Early life and education ==
Jämtin briefly studied at Stockholm University, without obtaining any degree.

== Political career ==
Jämtin began her political career in the Swedish Social Democratic Youth League, and was a board member of the organization from 1990 to 1992, thereafter serving as treasurer and acting secretary. Prior to her appointment in 2003, she worked as the Deputy Secretary General of the Olof Palme International Center. She was chair of the National Council of Swedish Children and Youth Organisations (LSU) from 1993 to 1995.

=== Member of the Swedish Parliament ===
At the general election in September 2006, Jämtin was elected to the Riksdag, i.e. member of parliament. Only a month later, in October 2006, she was elected Leader of the Opposition in the City Council of Stockholm. She decided to keep her seat in parliament for at least two months, citing her desire to fight for proposals made by Social-Democrats from Stockholm. While Jämtin was one of the favourites to succeed Göran Persson as leader of the Social Democrats at the party's congress in March 2007, her retention of the seat in parliament fuelled speculation that she might run for party leadership. It was generally considered that the next Social Democratic leader should be a member of parliament.

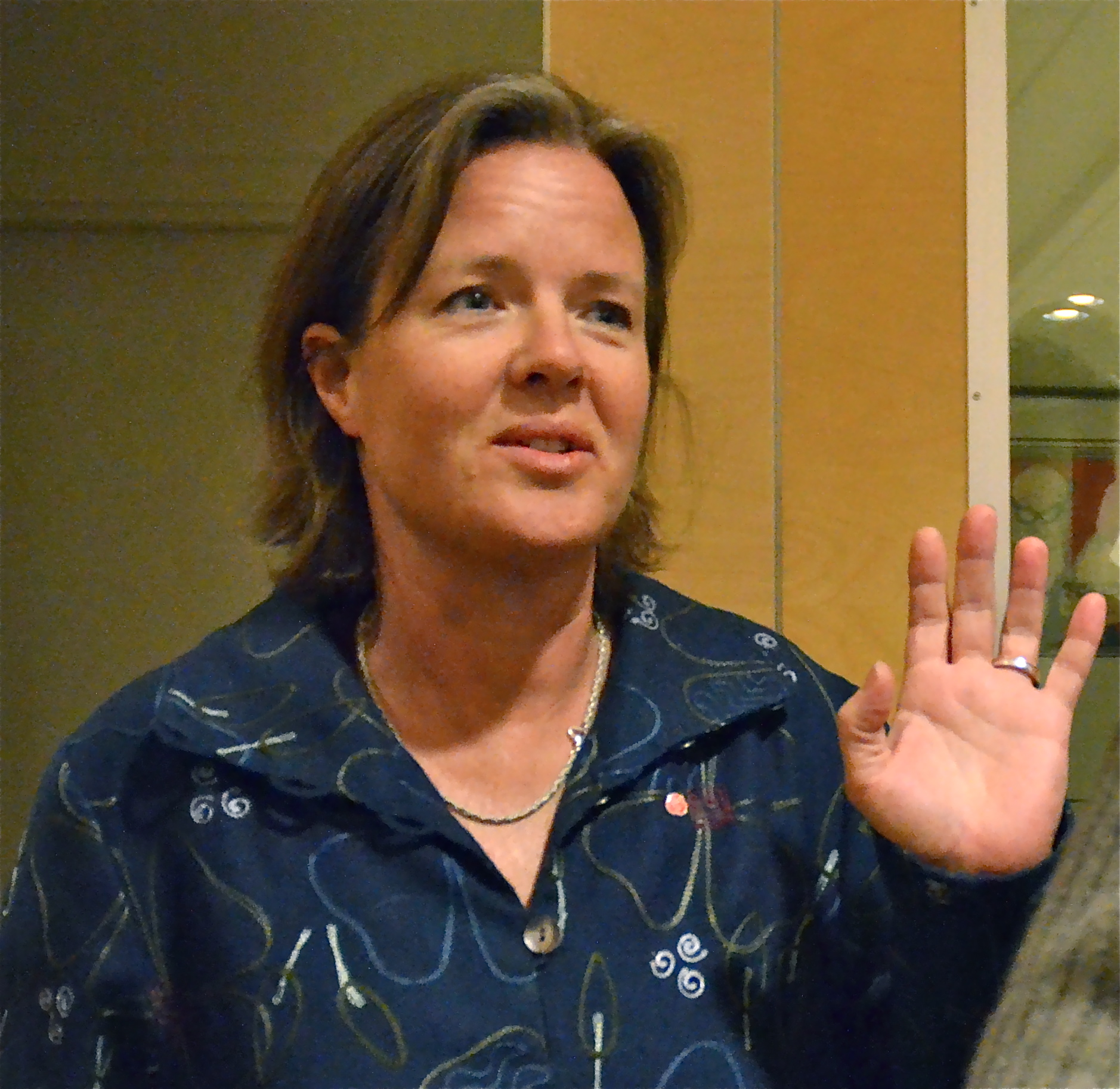
Carin Jämtin in January 2012

On 23 November 2006, Sweden's biggest newspaper Aftonbladet (independently social-democratic), endorsed Jämtin as party leader, but she declined running.

On 16 August 2016, Jämtin announced her intention to resign as party secretary in order to fulfill her position as Member of the Riksdag.

== Other activities ==
- European Council on Foreign Relations (ECFR), Member

== Views on Israel-Palestine conflict ==
During a visit to Israel and the West Bank in 2005 Jämtin called the wall between the two "Crazy and sick" and that she felt that a two state solution is impossible because of Israels actions, and that if Israel wants to build a wall it should do so in its own territory. The comments received a lot of commentary from media in Sweden. In September 2011, Jämtin along with Urban Ahlin voiced their support for a Swedish recognition of a Palestinian state.

Party political offices
Preceded by Ibrahim Baylan	Secretary-General of the Swedish Social Democratic Party; 2011–2016	Succeeded by Lena Rådström Baastad
Political offices
Preceded by Jan O. Karlsson	Minister for International Development Cooperation; 2003–2006	Succeeded by Gunilla Carlsson
Government offices
Preceded by Charlotte Petri Gornitzka	Director-General of the Swedish International Development Agency; 2017—2023	Succeeded by Jakob Granit
Preceded by Berit Högman	Governor of Västernorrland County; 2023—	Succeeded by Incumbent
