= Lena Rådström Baastad =

Swedish politician (born 1974)

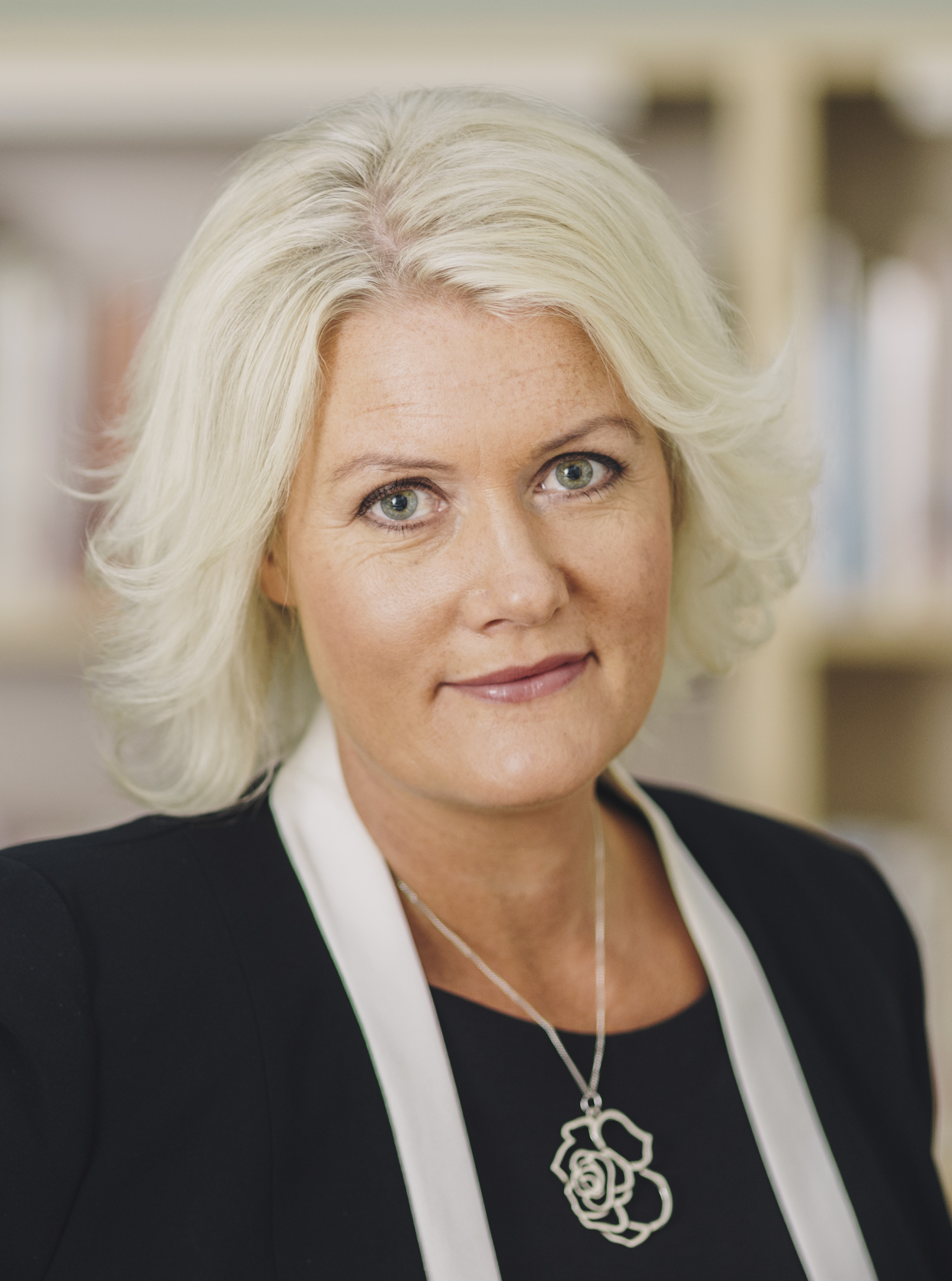

Governor of Örebro County
- Incumbent
- Assumed office 1 March 2023
- Monarch: Carl XVI Gustaf
- Prime Minister: Ulf Kristersson
- Preceded by: Maria Larsson

Secretary-General of the Social Democratic Party
- In office 27 August 2016 – 6 November 2021
- Leader: Stefan Löfven
- Preceded by: Carin Jämtin
- Succeeded by: Tobias Baudin

Mayor of Örebro
- In office 1 June 2011 – 27 February 2016
- Preceded by: Kent Persson
- Succeeded by: Kenneth Nilsson

Personal details
- Born: 4 April 1974 (age 52) Örebro, Sweden
- Party: Social Democratic Party

Lena Therese Rådström Baastad, née Larsson, (born 4 April 1974) is a Swedish politician and civil servant who currently serves as Governor of Örebro County since 2023. A member of the Social Democratic Party, she previously served as Secretary-General of the Social Democratic Party from 2016 to 2021 and as Mayor of Örebro Municipality from 2011 to 2016.

During the spring of 2016, between serving as Mayor and before being elected Secretary-General, Rådström Baastad worked as a consultant at Gaia Leadership. She was Member of the Riksdag, representing Örebro County, from September 2018 until her resignation in September 2021.

Political offices
Preceded by Kent Persson	Mayor of Örebro Municipality; 2011—2016	Succeeded by Kenneth Nilsson
Party political offices
Preceded by Carin Jämtin	Secretary-General of the Social Democratic Party; 2016—2021	Succeeded by Tobias Baudin
Government offices
Preceded by Maria Larsson	Governor of Örebro County; 2023—	Succeeded by Incumbent
