= Minister for Children =

Minister for Children or Minister of Children may refer to:

- Minister for Child Protection (Western Australia), a ministerial position in the Government of Western Australia
- Minister for Children (United Kingdom), a Minister of State in the Government of the UK
- Minister for Children, the Elderly and Equality (Sweden), a ministerial post in the Government of Sweden
- Minister of Children and Families, a cabinet position in the Government of Norway
- Ministry of Children and Family Development (British Columbia), a cabinet position in the Government of British Columbia, Canada
- Minister for Children, Young People and the Promise, a junior ministerial position in the Scottish Government
- Minister for Children, Disability and Equality, a senior cabinet position in the Government of Ireland
- Ministry of Children, Community and Social Services, a cabinet position in the Government of Ontario, Canada
- Ministry of Women and Child Development, a ministerial position in the Government of India
