= Lena Hallengren =

Swedish Social Democratic politician

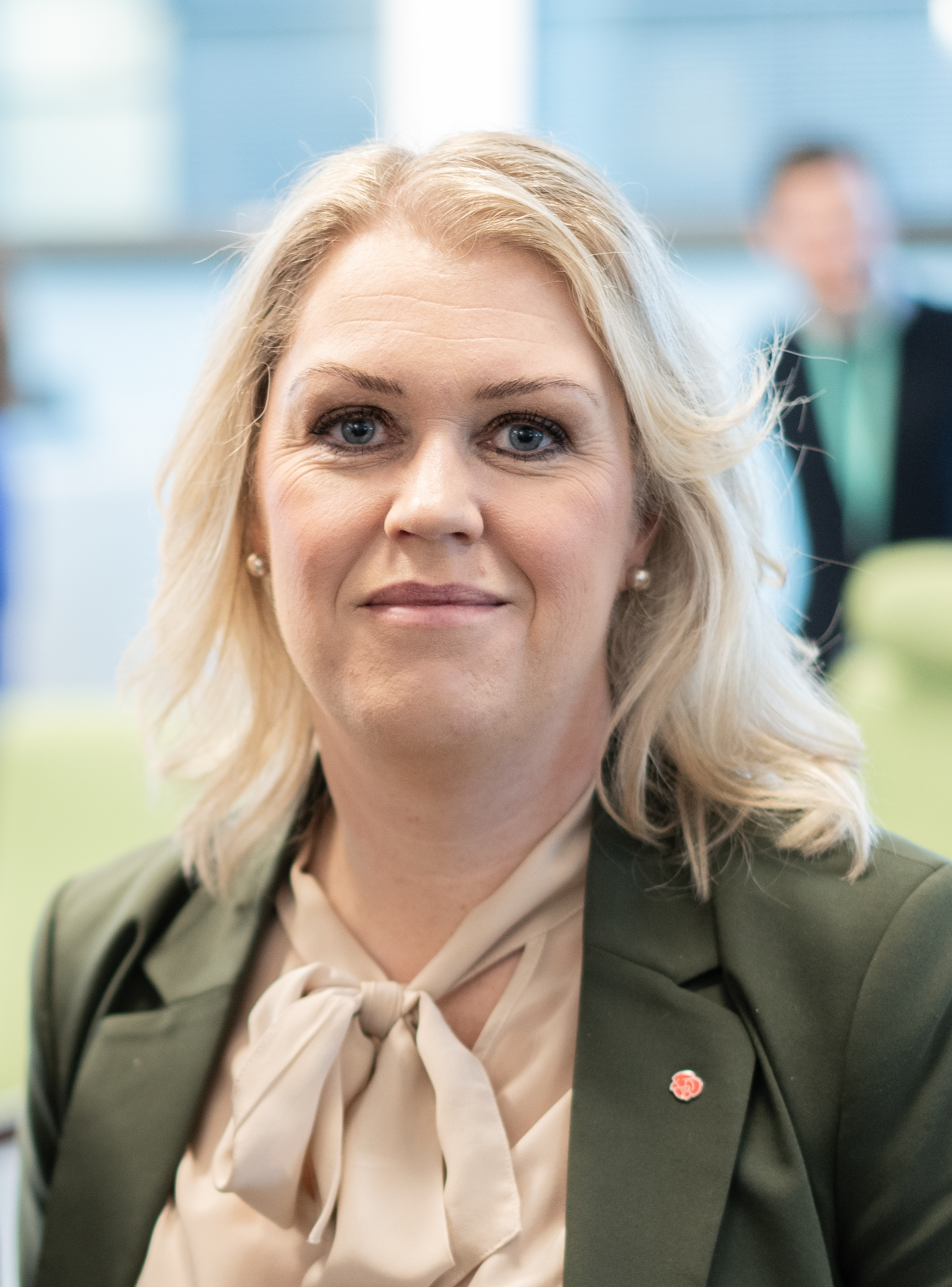
- Hallengren in 2020

Minister for Health and Social Affairs
- In office 21 January 2019 – 6 October 2022
- Monarch: Carl XVI Gustaf
- Prime Minister: Stefan Löfven; Magdalena Andersson
- Preceded by: Annika Strandhäll
- Succeeded by: Ardalan Shekarabi

Minister for Children and the Elderly
- In office 8 March 2018 – 21 January 2019
- Monarch: Carl XVI Gustaf
- Prime Minister: Stefan Löfven
- Preceded by: Åsa Regnér
- Succeeded by: Office abolished

Minister for Gender Equality
- In office 8 March 2018 – 21 January 2019
- Monarch: Carl XVI Gustaf
- Prime Minister: Stefan Löfven
- Preceded by: Åsa Regnér
- Succeeded by: Åsa Lindhagen

Minister of Preschool Education, Adult Education and Youth
- In office 21 October 2002 – 6 October 2006
- Prime Minister: Göran Persson
- Preceded by: Ingegerd Wärnersson
- Succeeded by: Jan Björklund (Minister of Schools)

Member of the Riksdag
- In office 2 October 2006 – 3 August 2018
- Constituency: Kalmar County

Personal details
- Born: 25 December 1973 (age 52) Kalmar, Sweden
- Party: Social Democrats

Lena Ingeborg Hallengren (born 25 December 1973) is a Swedish politician of the Social Democratic Party who has been served as Minister for Health and Social Affairs in the cabinet of Prime Minister Stefan Löfven from 21 January 2019 until he left office in November 2021. Hallengren then continued in the same role in the Andersson Cabinet.

== Political career ==
In the government of Prime Minister Göran Persson, Hallengren served as Deputy Minister of Education, in charge of preschool education, youth affairs and adult learning, from 2002 to 2006.

Hallengren has been a member of the Riksdag since the 2006 elections. In that capacity, she served as member of the Member of the Committee on Environment and Agriculture (2006–2009) and later chaired the Committee on Transport and Communications (2009–2010) and the Committee on Education (2014–2018).

In March 2018, Hallengren became Minister for Children, the Elderly and Equality after her predecessor Åsa Regnér left the government for a post in the United Nations. This was an office at the Ministry of Health and Social Affairs in the first Löfven Cabinet. At the formation of the second cabinet under prime minister Stefan Löfven in January 2019, Hallengren was promoted to head of the same ministry. In September 2022, Hallengren was elected as leader for the Social Democrats in the Riksdag. Subsequently, she resigned in October 2022 from her office as Minister for Health and Social Affairs.

Since 2020, Hallengren has also been a member of the Global Leaders Group on Antimicrobial Resistance, co-chaired by Sheikh Hasina and Mia Mottley.

== Other activities ==
- Global Partnership to End Violence Against Children, Member of the Board (since 2018)
- Participant at Bilderberg meeting in Washington D.C., 2–5 June 2022

Party political offices
Preceded by Pernilla Mobeck	Secretary-General of the Social Democratic Youth League; 1999–2002	Succeeded by Caroline Waldheim
Preceded by Gunilla Carlsson	Leader of the Social Democrats in the Riksdag; 2022–present	Incumbent
Government offices
Preceded by Ingegerd Wärnersson (as Minister for Schools)	Deputy Minister for Education; Minister for Preschools and Adult Education; 2002–2006	Succeeded by Jan Björklund (as Minister for Schools)
Preceded by Britta Lejon	Minister for the Youth; 2002–2006	Succeeded by Nyamko Sabuni
Preceded by Åsa Regnér	Minister for Children and the Elderly; 2018–2019	Succeeded by Herself (as Minister for Health and Social Affairs); Åsa Lindhagen (as Minister for Children)
Preceded by Åsa Regnér	Minister for Gender Equality; 2018–2019	Succeeded by Åsa Lindhagen
Preceded by Annika Strandhäll	Minister for Health and Social Affairs; 2019–2022	Succeeded by Ardalan Shekarabi
