= Maria Larsson (politician) =

Swedish politician (born 1956)

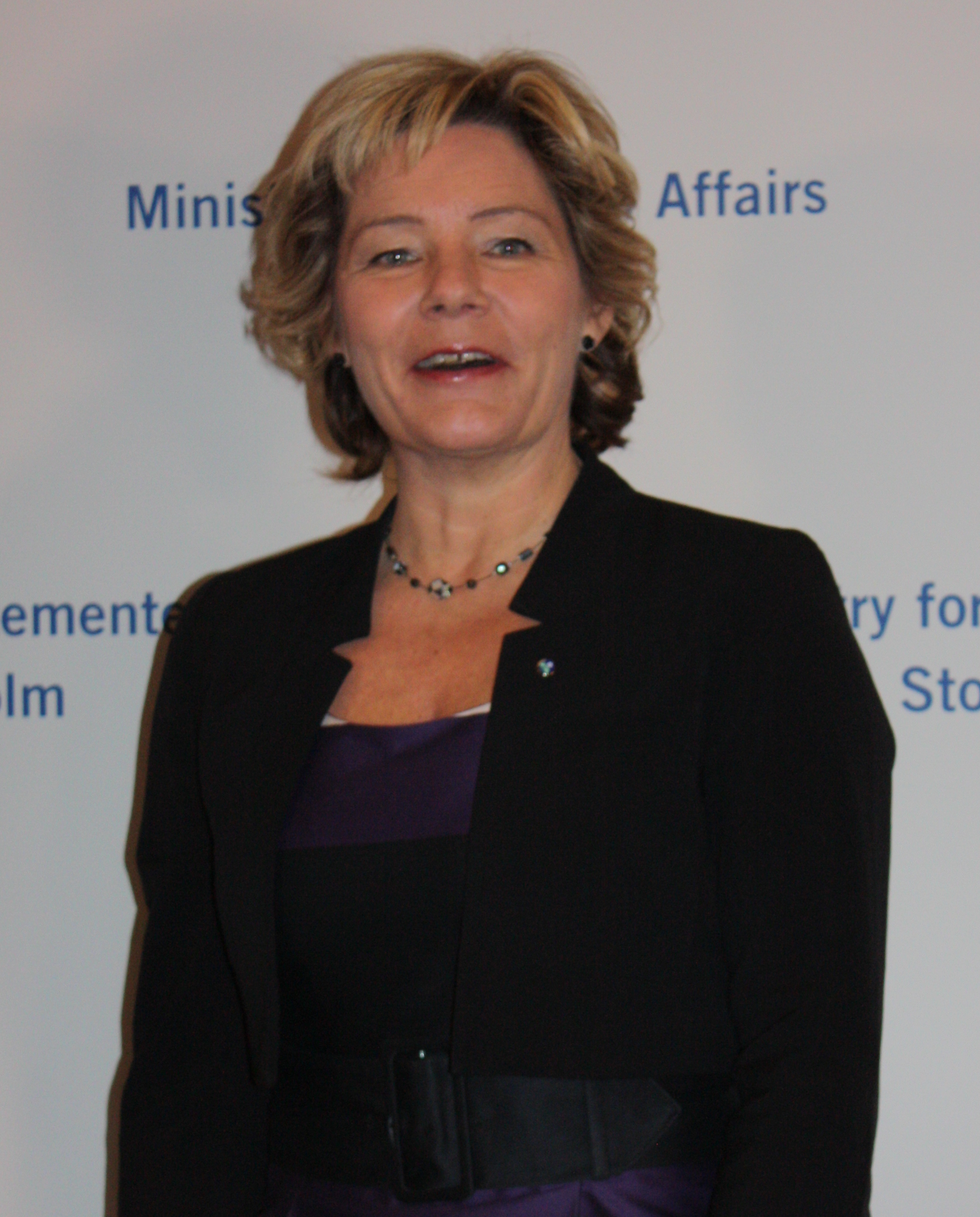

Governor of Örebro County
- In office 4 May 2015 – 31 December 2022
- Preceded by: Rose-Marie Frebran
- Succeeded by: Anna Olofsson (acting)

Minister for Children and the Elderly
- In office 5 October 2010 – 3 October 2014
- Prime Minister: Fredrik Reinfeldt
- Preceded by: Position established
- Succeeded by: Åsa Regnér

Minister for the Elderly and Public Health
- In office 6 October 2006 – 5 October 2010
- Prime Minister: Fredrik Reinfeldt
- Preceded by: Morgan Johansson
- Succeeded by: Position abolished

Member of the Swedish Riksdag for Jönköping County
- In office 5 October 1998 – 29 September 2014

Personal details
- Born: 20 January 1956 (age 70) Långasjö, Emmaboda, Kalmar, Sweden
- Party: Christian Democrats
- Spouse: Gunnar Larsson
- Children: 3
- Profession: Teacher

Ingrid Maria Larsson (born 20 January 1956 in Långasjö) is a Swedish politician of the Christian Democrats who served as Governor of Örebro County from May 2015 to December 2022, appointed by the cabinet of Stefan Löfven. She previously served as Minister for Children and the Elderly from 2010 to 2014 and as Minister for the Elderly and Public Health from 2006 to 2010. A member of the Christian Democrats, she was an MP of the Swedish Riksdag from 1998 to 2014.

Following the 2014 election defeat and her defeat from the Riksdag, Larsson announced that she will leave politics and step down as deputy party leader in 2015.

== Career ==
She is a trained schoolteacher, and is married with three children. She was a Member of Parliament from 1998 to 2014 representing Jönköping County, and deputy chairman of the Christian Democrats from 2003 to 2015.

Government offices
Preceded by Morgan Johansson	Minister for the Elderly and Public Health; 2006—2010	Succeeded by Position abolished
Preceded by Position established	Minister for Children and the Elderly; 2010—2014	Succeeded by Åsa Regnér
Preceded by Rose-Marie Frebran	Governor of Örebro County; 2015—2022	Succeeded by Anna Olofsson (acting)
