= Ylva Thörn =

Swedish politician and trade unionist

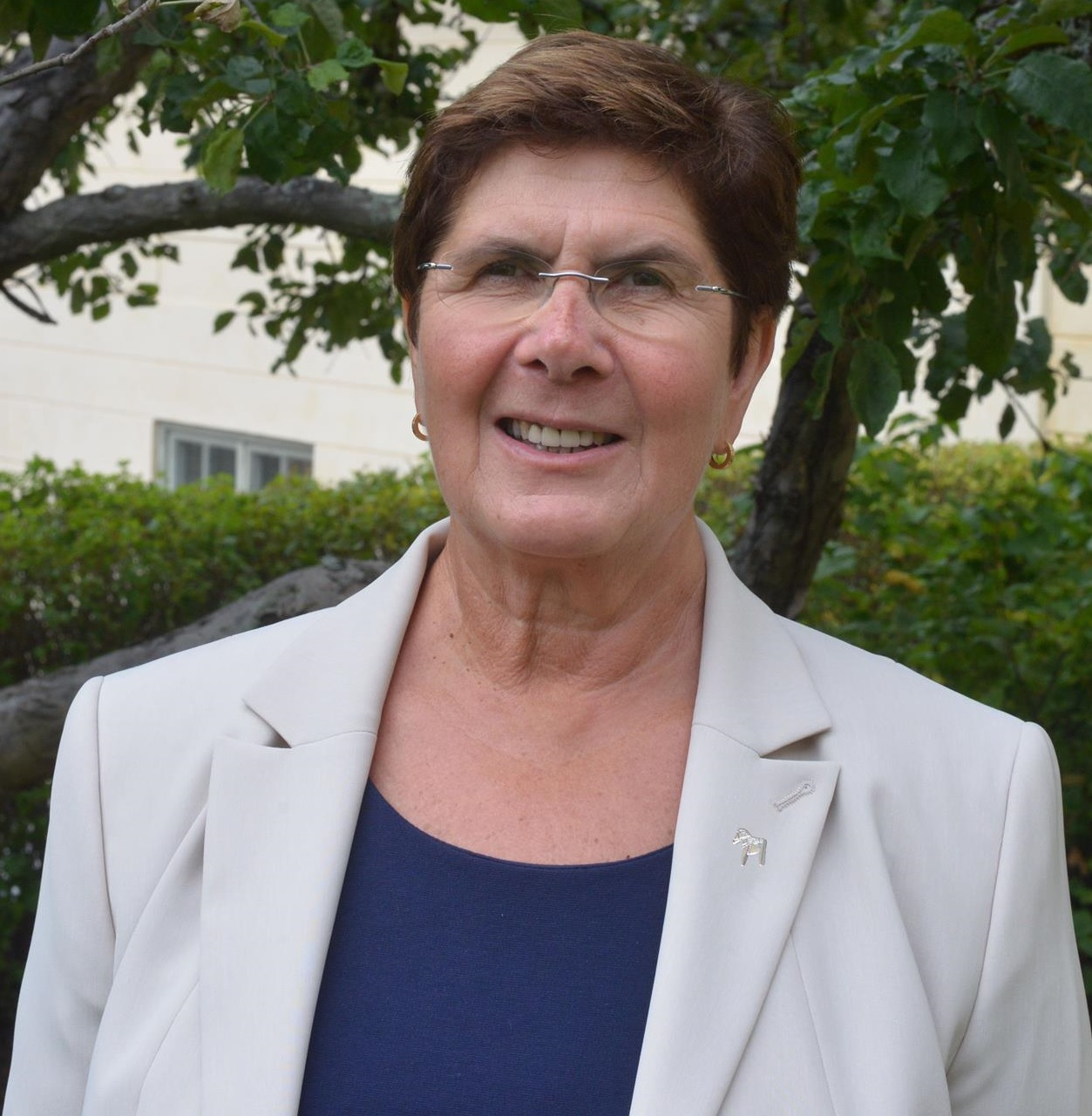
Thörn in 2015

Ylva Thörn (born 2 August 1954) is a Swedish politician and former trade unionist.

Born in Åtvidaberg, Thörn became a nursing assistant in 1974, initially in Åtvidaberg and then in Linköping. She joined the Swedish Municipal Workers' Union (Kommunal), and began working full-time for the union in 1987, as a regional officer. She became president of Kommunal in 1996, and in 2002 additionally became president of the Public Services International.

Thörn left her union posts in 2010, and started working for the Swedish Social Democratic Party, becoming deputy general secretary of the party in 2012. In 2015, she was appointed as Governor of Dalarna County.

Trade union offices
Preceded by Sten Törnblom	President of the Swedish Municipal Workers' Union; 1996–2010	Succeeded by Annelie Nordström
Preceded by William Lucy	President of the Public Services International; 2002–2010	Succeeded by Dave Prentis
Government offices
Preceded by Maria Norrfalk	Governor of Dalarna County; 2015—2021	Succeeded by Helena Höij
