= Tobias Baudin =

Swedish politician and trade unionist (born 1974)

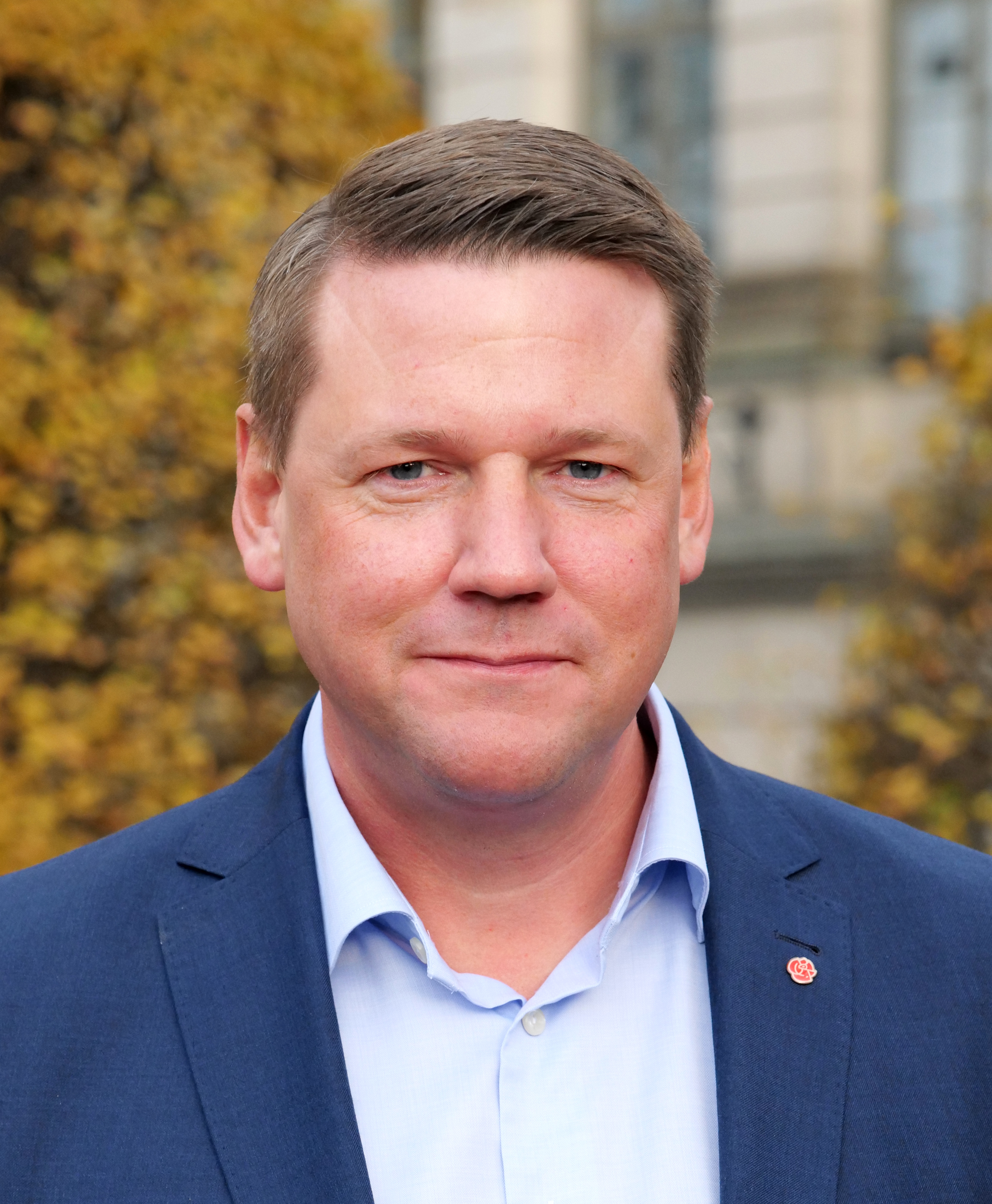
- Baudin in 2021

Secretary-General of the Social Democratic Party
- Incumbent
- Assumed office 6 November 2021
- Leader: Magdalena Andersson
- Preceded by: Lena Rådström Baastad

President of the Swedish Municipal Workers' Union
- In office 1 June 2016 – 6 November 2021
- Deputy: Malin Ragnegård; Johan Ingelskog
- Preceded by: Annelie Nordström
- Succeeded by: Malin Ragnegård

Personal details
- Born: 25 December 1974 (age 51) Luleå, Sweden
- Party: Social Democratic
- Occupation: Trade union leader, politician

Åke Sigurd Tobias Baudin (born 25 December 1974) is a Swedish Social Democratic politician and trade union leader who has served as Secretary-General of the Social Democratic Party since November 2021. He served as President of the Swedish Municipal Workers' Union from 2016 to 2021 and previously as vice president of the same organization from 2010 to 2012 before serving as vice president of the Swedish Trade Union Confederation (LO) from 2012 to 2016.

== Biography ==
=== Early life and education ===
Baudin has a professional background as a machinist and has been educated in automation and control engineering.

=== Trade union career ===
He became involved with the trade union Swedish Municipal Workers' Union through his workplace and was elected a workplace representative in 2000. From 2004 to 2010, Baudin was elected to the trade unions federal board. He has served as president of the Swedish Municipal Workers' Union in Norrbotten (2009–2010), first vice president of the same organization from 2010 to 2012 and as first vice president of Swedish Trade Union Confederation (LO) (2012–2016).

==== President of the Swedish Municipal Workers' Union ====
Baudin was elected trade union president for the Swedish Municipal Workers' Union at the union's congress in 2016, as Annelie Nordström's successor.

== Political career ==
=== Secretary-General of the Social Democratic Party ===
Baudin was designated Secretary-General of the Social Democratic Party on 12 October 2021 ahead of the party's congress in November 2021 alongside Magdalena Andersson as party leader. He was subsequently elected to the position on 6 November 2021.

== Controversies and scandals ==
- Swedish Municipal Workers' Union experienced a major scandal during Baudin's leadership. Workers' Union was heavily criticised for squandering funds. An investigation by Aftonbladet revealed that Swedish Municipal Workers' Union had misallocated hundreds of millions on luxury trips, pornographic shows and loss-making ventures.
- In 2024, Baudin said that he is prepared to create legislation that harms his political opponents after the Tidö government proposed targeted legislation against the funding of the Social Democrats.

Trade union offices
Preceded by Ulla Lindqvist	Vice President of the Swedish Trade Union Confederation; 2012–2016	Succeeded by Therese Guovelin
Preceded by Annelie Nordström	President of the Swedish Municipal Workers' Union; 2016–2021	Succeeded by Malin Ragnegård
Party political offices
Preceded by Lena Rådström Baastad	Secretary-General of the Social Democratic Party; 2021–	Succeeded by Incumbent
