= Anders Flanking =

Swedish politician, 37th Governor of Gotland and Secretary of State

Anders Flanking MP
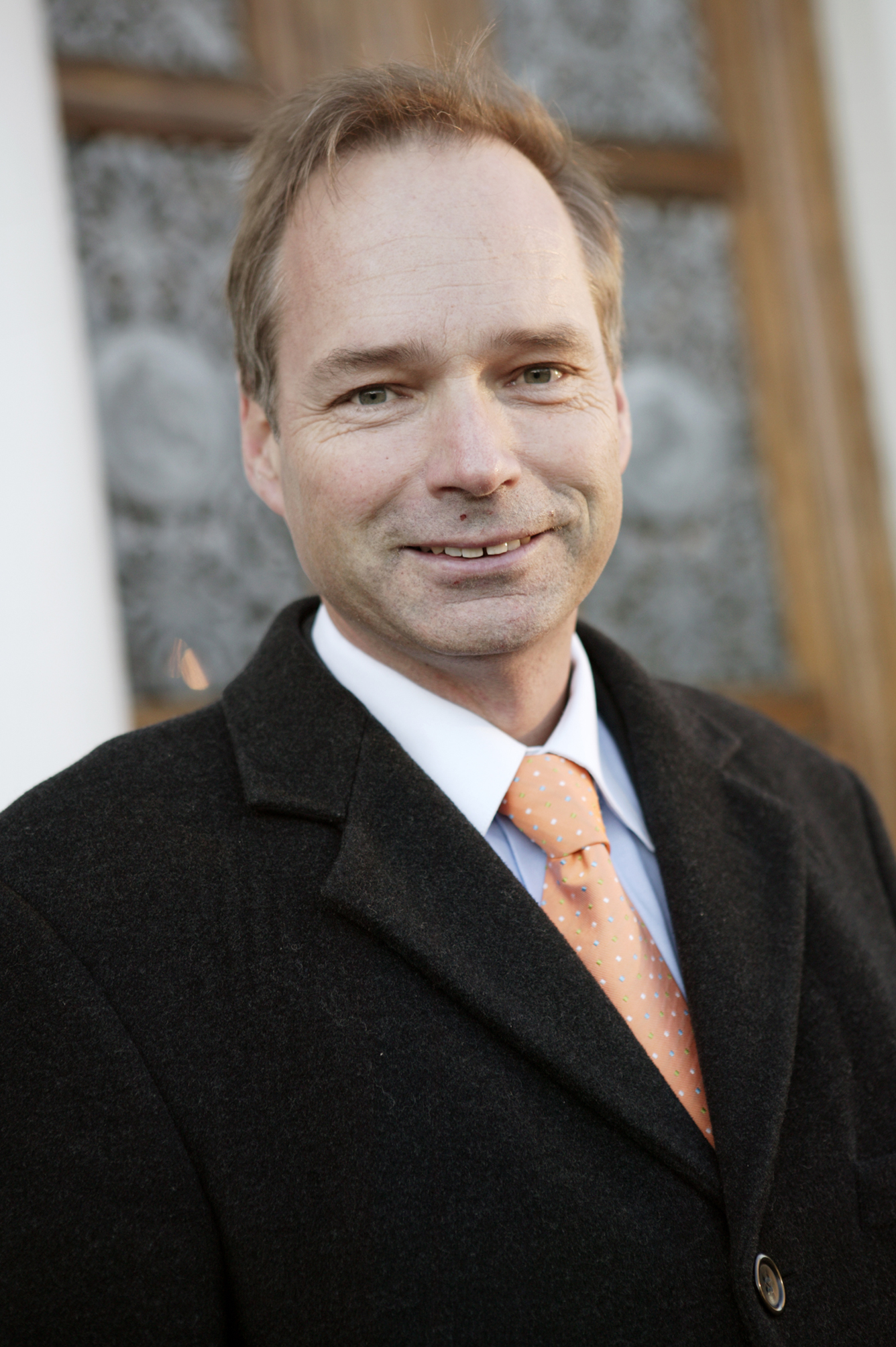
- Flanking in 2006.

37th Governor of Gotland County
- In office 1 June 2019 – 1 November 2024
- Appointed by: Löfven cabinet
- Preceded by: Cecilia Schelin Seidegård
- Succeeded by: Charlotte Petri Gornitzka

Personal details
- Born: 4 October 1957 (age 68) Skövde, Västergötland, Sweden
- Party: Centre Party
- Children: 3

Per Anders Daniel Flanking (born 4 October 1957) is a Swedish politician and civil servant, serving as Governor of Gotland County from 2019 to 2024. He also held office as Secretary of the Centre Party between 2006–2010 and Secretary of State between 2011 and 2014.

== Early life ==
He is born and raised in Skövde, Sweden, and studied the Social Science Programme in high school. Between 1978–1979 and 1985–1988, Flanking attended the Karlberg Military Academy and studied human resources at the University of Gothenburg respectively, the latter of which he dropped out of. After his studies, Flanking worked in several professions, including Senior Consultant at KPMG between 1998–2000 and as a military officer.

== Political career ==
At 19 years of age, he was elected Member of the Municipal Council of Skövde, and later promoted to Chairman of the Municipal Board of Skövde in 1989. As chairman, he participated in the 1991 election and was responsible for increasing the Centre Party's vote count by two-fold, both locally and nationally. This resulted in massa media began reporting about the "Flanking Effect". The vote increase trend continued after the 1994 election. In 1995, Flanking was made Member of the Centre Party's Executive Committee and of its section for local government politics. He took a break from politics following the turn of the millennium.

Flanking returned in 2005 and was made Chairman of the Centre Party's Nominating Committee, and in 2006, candidated to the City Council of Gothenburg. The same year, he succeeded Jöran Hägglund as Secretary of the Centre Party and also started a five-year term as elected Member of the Swedish National Bank Council. In the 2010 election, Flanking was elected Member of the Riksdag for Gothenburg Municipality, thus leaving the offices in the City Council and handing the Party Secretary duties to Michael Arthursson.

On 30 September 2011, Flanking held office as Secretary of State of the Ministry of the Environment. While serving as Secretary of State, Flanking became MP-on-leave, during which time Rickard Nordin and Karin Östring Bergman took turns as acting MP for Gothenburg. When the four-party Alliance lost the 2014 election, Flanking returned to the private sector. In 2016 he was appointed Governor of Kronoberg County, acting as Interim Governor for part of his time there. Flanking left Kronoberg when his appointment as Governor of Gotland County was announced in May 2019.
