= Sigvard Marjasin =

Swedish trade unionist and politician (1929–2021)

Governor of Örebro County
- In office 1989–1994

Personal details
- Born: November 24, 1929
- Died: January 24, 2021 (aged 91); Örebro, Sweden
- Cause of death: COVID-19

Mauritz Sigvard Marjasin (24 November 1929 – 24 January 2021) was a Swedish official and union official. He was chairman of the Swedish Municipal Workers' Union 1977–1988 and governor of Örebro County 1989–1994. He died of COVID-19 during the COVID-19 pandemic in Sweden.

== Background ==
Marjasin went to seven-year primary school. After graduation, he held several jobs, including courier, charcutier, sailor, and commis, and had various jobs in hotels. He also did union work and took courses that eventually lead to a Bachelor of Social Services, after which he worked as the administrator of a union night school.

He volunteered for Israel in the 1948 Arab–Israeli War.

Marjasin was active in the Municipal Workers' Union 1963–1988, first as ombudsman 1963–1967, as education secretary 1967–1978, and as union chairman 1978–1988. As chairman, Marjasin was active and outgoing. He often appeared in media as well as in debates and rallies. He earned a reputation for his quick replies, and was sought after as an interviewee in the press, where his statements were often given negative attention. He made himself known for his fierce opposition to privatization, especially in child care.

Marjasin was governor of Örebro County from 1989 to 1994. During this time, he took the initiative for the renovation of Örebro Castle which was carried out in the years 1992–1993.

Upon his retirement in 1994, he was appointed chairman of the newly created Granskningskommissionen, a council reviewing the police investigation of the assassination of prime minister Olof Palme. He held this position until 1996.

In 1996, Marjasin was suspected of having submitted manipulated receipts and double invoicing expenses during his time as governor. He was charged with breach of trust, fraud, and repression of records. Marjasin commented on the indictment, saying he had acted "clumsily, but not unethically or criminally". In the end, Marjasin was completely acquitted by the court, where the verdict clarified that Marjasin had no accountability at all. In connection with the indictment, Sigvard Marjasin was subjected to extensive media coverage. The media attention was most intense during the summer of 1996, when Marjasin, with regard to the ongoing police investigation, did not want or could not speak to the press.
