= Nils Reuterholm =

Swedish baron, diplomat and politician

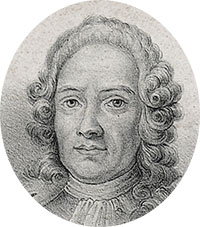
Nils Reuterholm

Nils Esbjörnsson Reuterholm (1676–1756) was the governor of Kopparberg County (later renamed Dalarna County) in Sweden from 1732 to 1739 and then the governor of Örebro County from 1739 to 1756.

He was made a member of the Royal Swedish Academy of Sciences in the year of its foundation, 1739.
