= Michael Arthursson =

Swedish politician

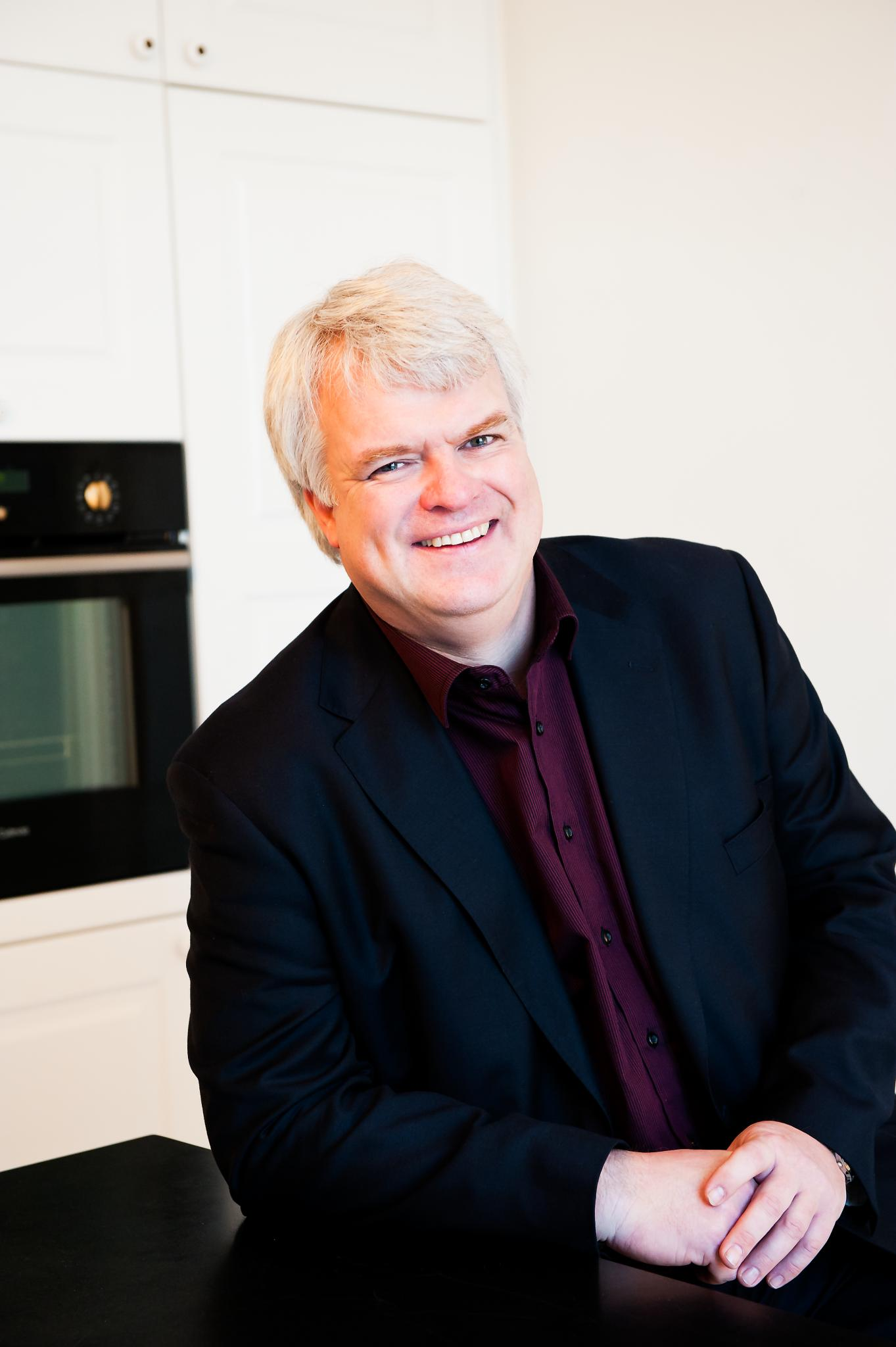

Secretary-General of the Centre Party
- Incumbent
- Assumed office 1 January 2011
- Party leader: Maud Olofsson; Annie Lööf
- Preceded by: Anders Flanking

Personal details
- Born: 13 May 1958 (age 67) Kungsbacka, Sweden
- Party: Centre Party
- Domestic partner: Lovisa Morén
- Children: 6

Jan Sigurd Michael Arthursson (born 13 May 1958) is a Swedish politician and the current Secretary-General of the Centre Party.

Arthursson joined the Centre Party Youth in 1977 and soon came to hold various positions within the center movement through the 1990s, including Federal Secretary of the Centre Party Youth, Chairman of the Centre Party in Stockholm and group leader in the municipality of Stockholm. Since then he has worked as a management consultant and was instrumental in starting the think tank Fores, where he was chairman until March 2010.

During the election campaign for the election of 2010, Arthursson was campaign manager for the Centre Party's national election campaign. On November 17, 2010 Arthursson was designated party secretary of the Centre Party and succeeded Anders Flanking on January 1, 2011.

Arthursson has his roots in Halland, but now lives in Hässelby outside Stockholm. He is the domestic partner of Lovisa Morén and has six children.
