= Berit Högman =

Swedish politician (born 1958)

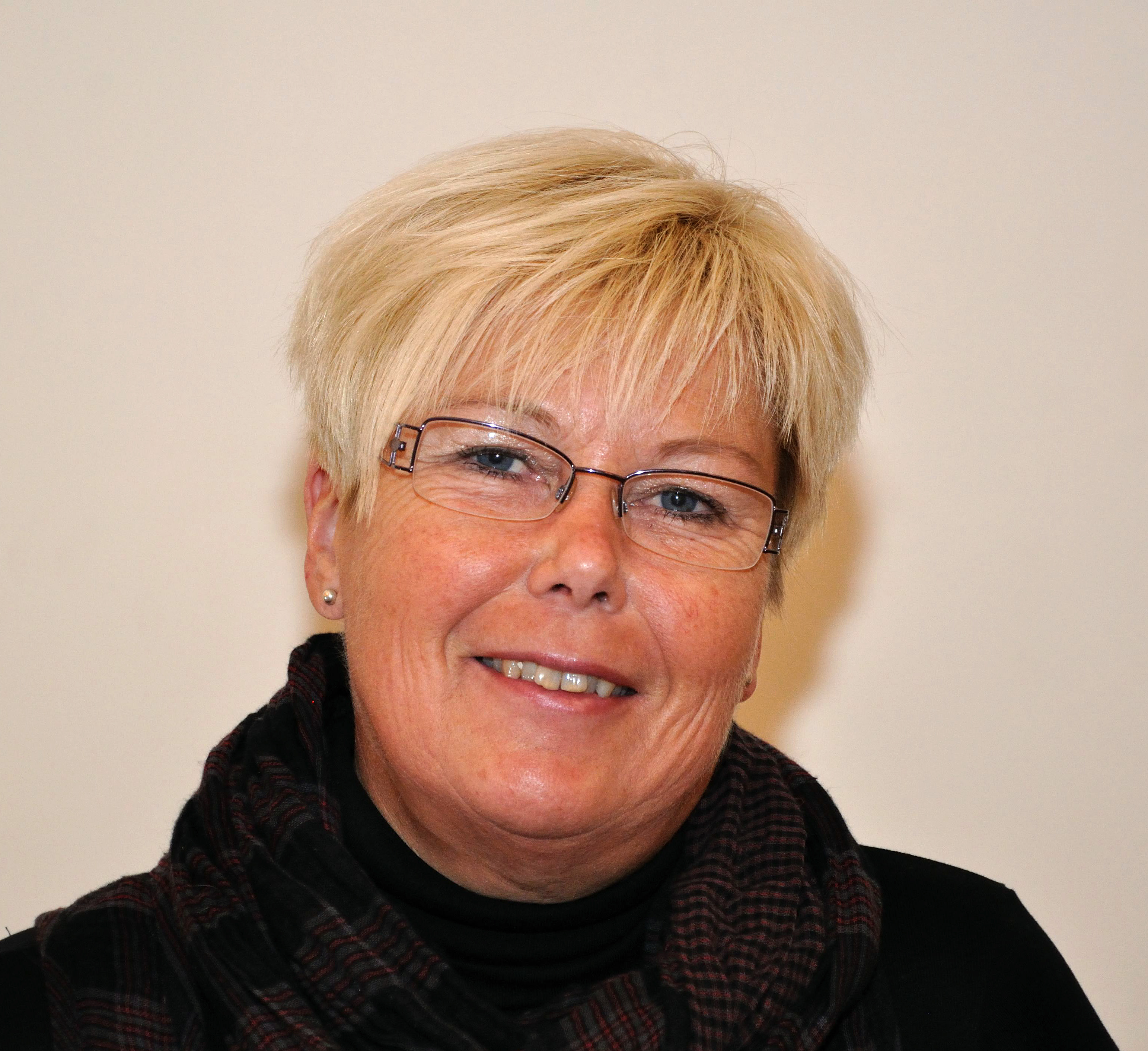

Governor of Västernorrland County
- In office 16 April 2018 – 31 July 2023
- Monarch: Carl XVI Gustaf
- Prime Minister: Stefan Löfven; Magdalena Andersson; Ulf Kristersson
- Preceded by: Gunnar Holmgren
- Succeeded by: Carin Jämtin

Member of Parliament
- In office 30 September 2002 – 26 March 2018
- Constituency: Värmland County

Personal details
- Born: 14 August 1958 (age 68) Torsby, Sweden
- Party: Social Democrats
- Occupation: Ombudsman, politician

Berit Högman (born 14 August 1958) is a Swedish politician and civil servant who served as Governor of Västernorrland County from 16 April 2018 to 31 July 2023.

A member of the Social Democrats, she was Member of Parliament (MP) from 2002 to 2018, representing Värmland County. She was chairperson of the parliamentary Committee on Cultural Affairs from 2010 to 2012.

Government offices
Preceded by Gunnar Holmgren	Governor of Västernorrland County; 2018—2023	Succeeded by Carin Jämtin
