= Cecilia Schelin Seidegård =

Swedish biochemist and civil servant

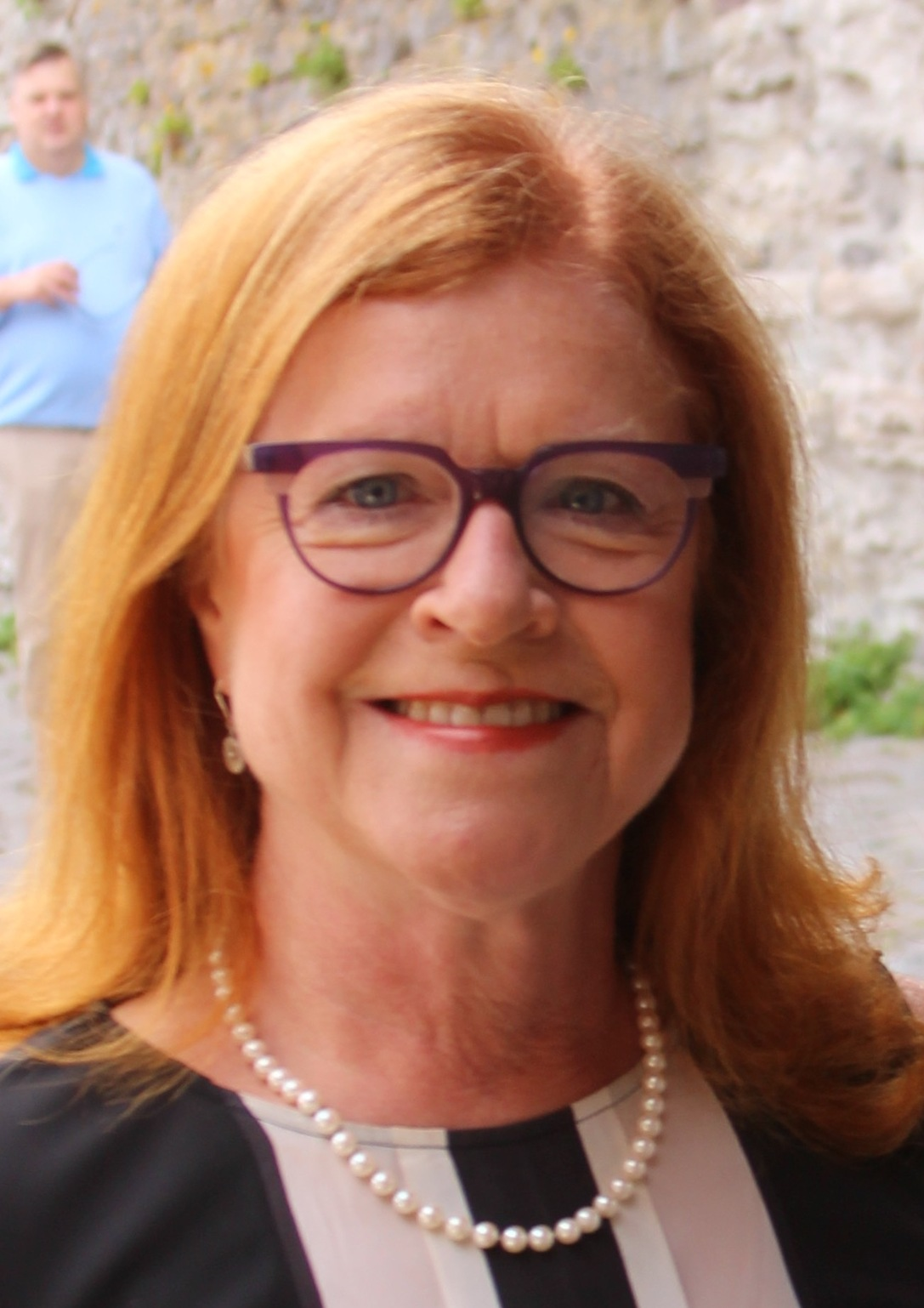
- Schelin Seidegård in 2016.
- In office 2010–2018

36th Governor of Gotland
- Appointed by: Cabinet of Fredrik Reinfeldt
- Prime Minister: Fredrik Reinfeldt
- Preceded by: Marianne Samuelsson
- Succeeded by: Anders Flanking

Personal details
- Born: Irene Cecilia Schelin; May 18, 1954 (age 71) Stockholm, Sweden
- Spouse: Janeric Seidegård
- Profession: Biochemist

Cecilia Schelin Seidegård (born 18 May 1954, in Stockholm as Irene Cecilia Schelin), is a Swedish biochemist who served as Governor of Gotland County from 2010 to 2018 (including a two-year extension beyond December 2016).

Seidegård grew up in Visby. In her youth, she was active in the Free Students, a political party of a students' union. For 1981–82, she was vice-chairman of the Swedish National Union of Students.

She obtained a Ph.D. in biochemistry, and then worked in the pharmaceutical industry, particularly in the Astra Group, where she was director of research at AstraZeneca. In 2003–2004, she was CEO of Huddinge University Hospital AB, and in 2004–2007 she was Director of the merged Karolinska University Hospital. Since 2004 she has been Chairman of the Board of the Royal Institute of Technology. Since 2008, she has also been chairman of the Systembolaget. She was elected in 2007 as a member of the Royal Swedish Academy of Engineering Sciences. From 2010 to 2018 she was County Governor of Gotland and in 2019 she was appointed County Governor of Kalmar County for one year.

Preceded by Marianne Samuelsson	Governor of Gotland; 2010–2018	Succeeded by Anders Flanking
