= Minister for Children, the Elderly and Equality (Sweden) =

Minister for Children, the Elderly and Equality was a minister post in the Ministry of Health and Social Affairs during the Löfven Cabinet. It was held by Åsa Regnér (2014–2018) and Lena Hallengren (2018–2019).

== See also ==
- Minister for Gender Equality (Sweden)
