= List of governors of Dalarna County =

Governor of Dalarna County
- Landshövding i Dalarnas län
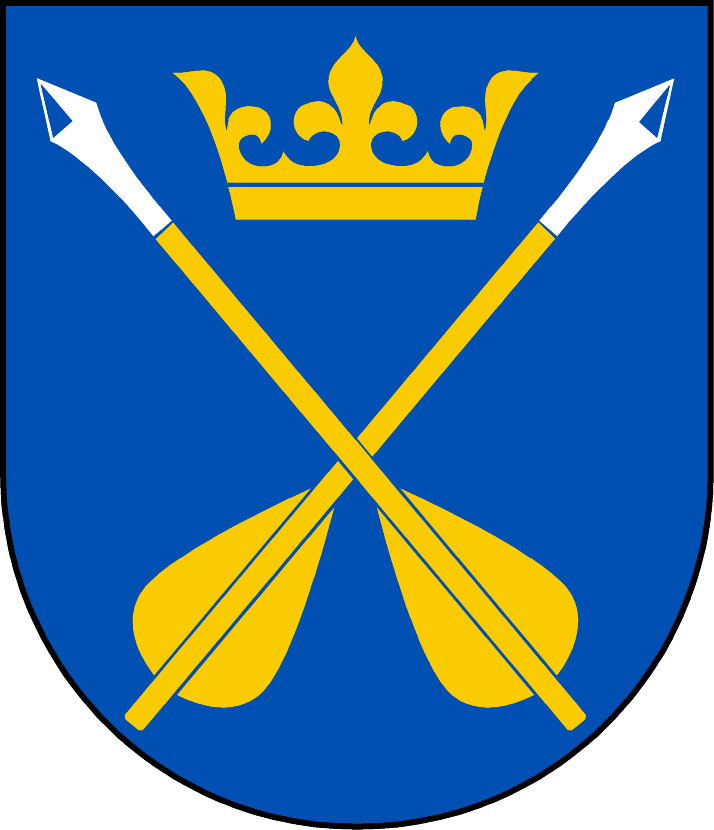
- Coat of arms of Dalarna County.

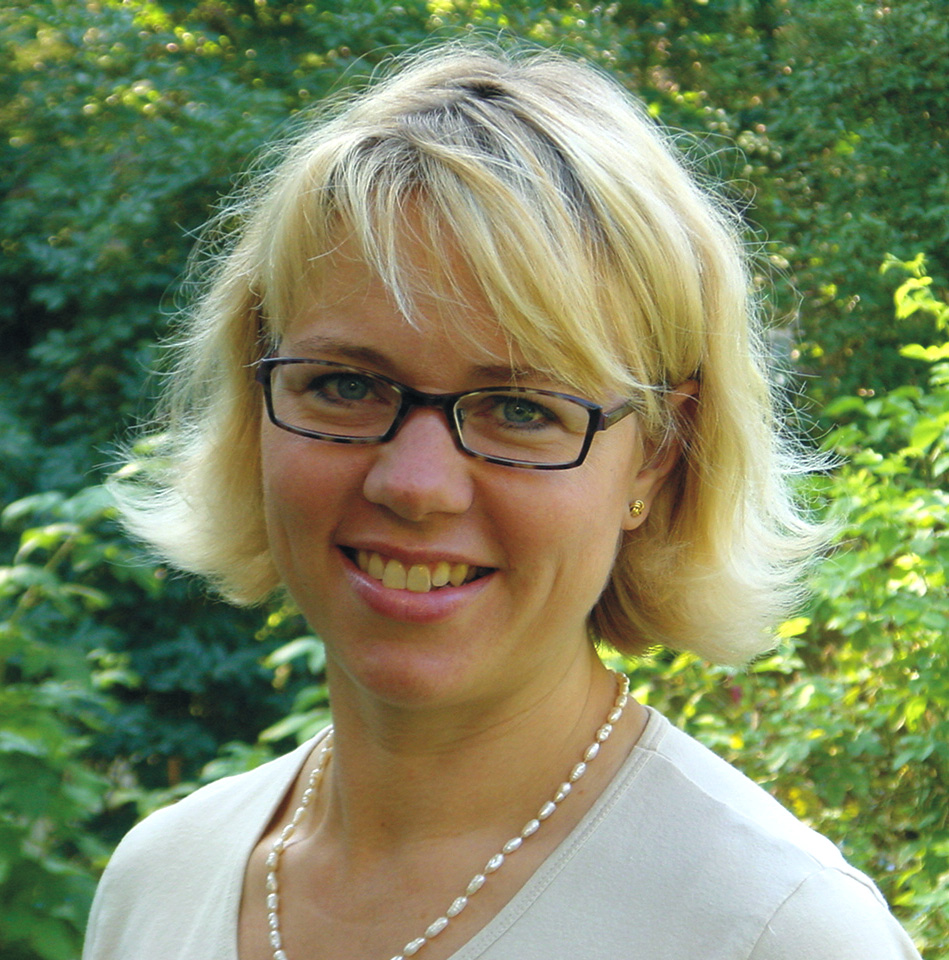
- Incumbent; Helena Höij since 1 November 2022
- Dalarna County Administrative Board
- Residence: The residence in Falun, Falun
- Appointer: Government of Sweden
- Term length: Six years (Note: The governor is often appointed for a six-year mandate. It can be extended if the person has not reached retirement age.)
- Precursor: Governor of Kronoberg County
- Formation: 4 October 1634
- First holder: Peter Kruse
- Deputy: County Director (Länsrådet)
- Salary: SEK 97,800/month (2017)
- Website: Official site

This is a list of governors for Dalarna County in Sweden, from 1634 to present. Dalarna County was known as Kopparberg County until 1997.

Picture	Governor	Took office	Left office
	Peter Kruse	4 October 1634	1645 (Note: Johan Berndes took office in 1641 as governor of Kopparberg County, and Kruse was for his remaining few years, in charge of what was eventually called Säter County (Säters län).)
	Johan Berndes	15 April 1641	1651
	Erik Fleming	30 April 1651	1655
	Lorentz Creutz	2 July 1655	1663
	Jesper Crusebjörn (acting)	1658	1659
	Gustaf Duwall	10 May 1662	1692
	Nils Gripenhielm	15 January 1692	1706
	Jacob Bure	1706	1709
	Jacob Reenstierna	21 May 1710	1713
	Jonas Cedercreutz	1713	1716
	Gustaf Gabriel Appellmann	5 October 1716	1719
	Otto Reinhold Strömfelt	6 November 1719	1723
	Peter von Danckwardt	16 September 1723	1732
	Nils Reuterholm	24 April 1732	1739
	Albrecht Lindcreutz	14 August 1739	1742
	Carl Gustaf Wennerstedt	1742	1755
	Bernhard Reinhold von Hauswolff	1756	1763
	Johan Abraham Hamilton	1763	1766
	Adolf Mörner	1766	1766
	Carl Cederström	1766	1781
	Johan Beck-Friis	1781	1790
	Johan af Nordin	29 October 1790	19 November 1812
	Hans Järta	19 November 1812	1822
	Per Daniel Lorichs	1822	1853
	Polykarpus Erik Cronhielm	1853	1856
	Olof af Geijerstam	1857	1863
	Johan Gustaf Samuel de Maré	13 November 1863	3 January 1880
	Curry Treffenberg	1880	1892
	Claës Wersäll	1893	1901
	Charles von Oelreich (acting)	1894	1897
	Fredrik Holmquist	21 January 1901 (Note: Acting from 23 November 1900)	1922
	Nils Ringstrand (acting)	28 November 1919	10 March 1920
	Herman Kvarnzelius	1922	1932
	Bernhard Eriksson	1932	1944
	Gustaf Andersson	1944	1951
	Eije Mossberg	1951	1957
	Gösta Elfving	1957	1973
	Bengt Olsson	1974	1980
	Ingvar Gullnäs	1980	1986
	Lilly Hansson	1986	1992
	Gunnar Björk	1992	2001
	Ingrid Dahlberg	2002	2006
	Maria Norrfalk	21 May 2007	31 August 2015
	Ylva Thörn	1 September 2015	31 July 2021
	Camilla Fagerberg Littorin (acting)	1 August 2021 (Note: County Director (Länsrådet) Camilla Fagerberg Littorin served as acting governor from 1 August 2021.)	30 October 2022
	Helena Höij	1 November 2022	31 October 2028
