= List of governors of Örebro County =

Governor of Örebro County
- Landshövding i Örebro län
- Coat of arms of Örebro County.

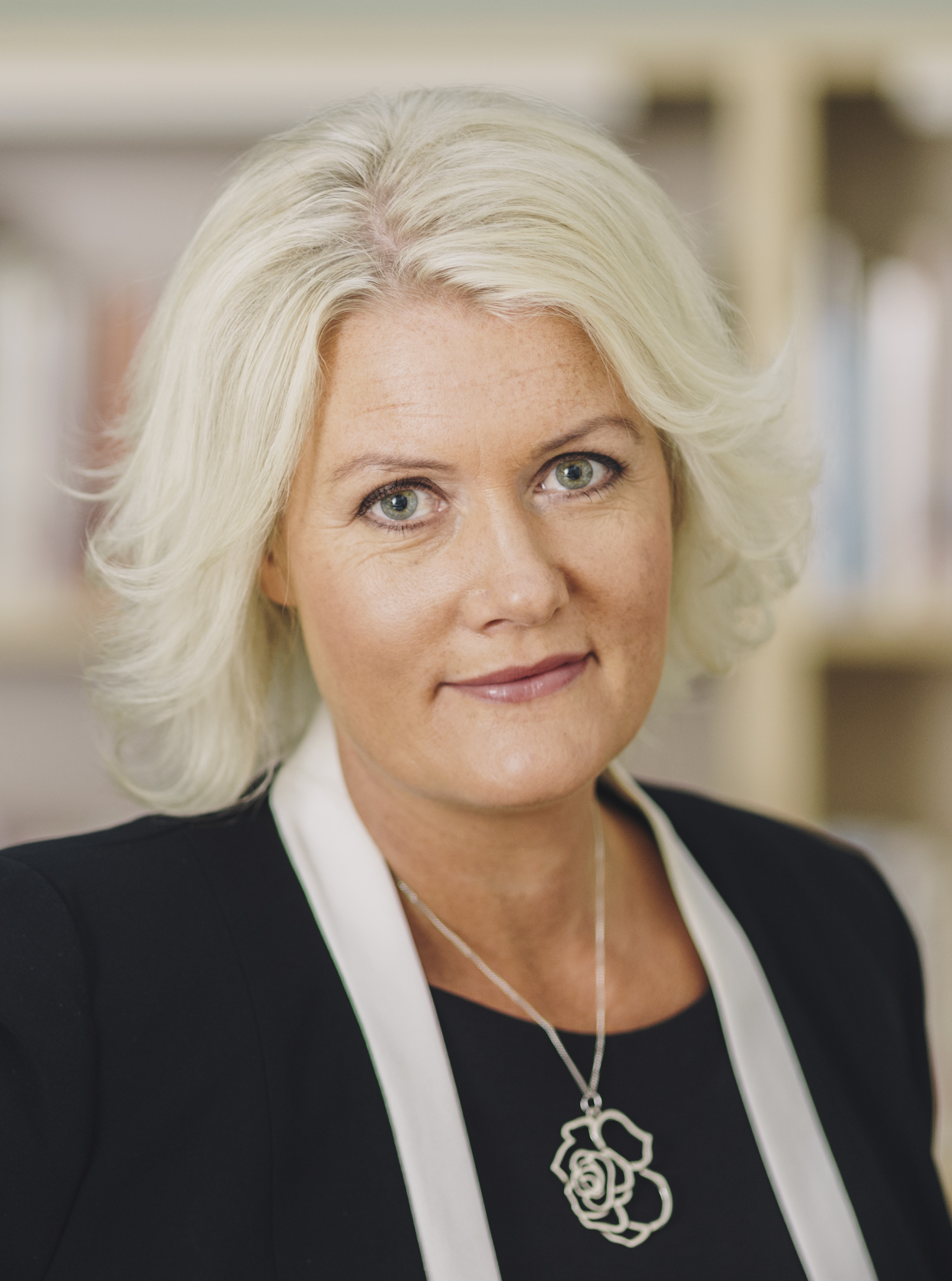
- Incumbent; Lena Rådström Baastad since 1 March 2023
- Örebro County Administrative Board
- Residence: Örebro Slott
- Appointer: Government of Sweden
- Term length: Six years (Note: The governor is often appointed for a six-year mandate. It can be extended if the person has not reached retirement age.)
- Formation: 1634
- First holder: Gustav Lejonhufvud
- Deputy: County Director (Länsrådet)
- Salary: SEK 97,800/month (2017)
- Website: Governor Maria Larsson

This is a list of governors for Örebro County in Sweden, from 1634 to present. In 1779 Värmland County separated from Närke and Värmland County and the county was renamed into Örebro County.

- Gustav Lejonhufvud (1634–1648)
- Krister Bonde (1648–1653)
- Gustav Soop (1653–1658)
- Abraham Lejonhufvud (1658–1676)
- Jacob Fleming (1676–1677)
- Mårten Reutercrantz (1677–1680)
- Klas Fleming (1680–1681)
- Gustav Lilliecrona (1681–1685)
- Didrich Wrangel (1685–1693)
- Fromhold Fägerskiöld (1693–1706)
- Salomon Cronhjelm (1707–1714)
- Klas Ekeblad (1714–1719)
- Konrad Ribbing (1719–1729)
- Erik Wrangel (1729–1739)
- Nils Reuterholm (1739–1756)
- Adolf Mörner (1756–1766)
- John A. Hamilton (1766–1780)
- Evert August Franc (1780–1796)
- Karl Didrik Hamilton (1796–1801)
- Solomon Lövenskjöld (1801–1816)
- Nils Gyldenstolpe (1817–1834)
- Wilhelm Albrecht d'Orchimont (acting 1834–1835)
- Erik Johan Bergensköld (1835–1856)
- Karl Åkerhielm (1856–1876)
- Axel Bergström (1876–1893)
- Axel G. Svedelius (1893–1904)
- Theodor Nordström (1904–1911)
- Karl Johan Bergström (1911–1925)
- Henning Elmqvist (1925–1928)
- Bror C. Hasselrot (1928–1947)
- Karl Johan Olsson (1947–1960)
- Valter Åman (1961–1971)
- Harald Aronsson (1971–1980)
- Ove Sundelius, (acting 1980)
- Elvy Olsson (1980–1989)
- Sigvard Marjasin (1989–1994)
- Lars Östring (acting 1994–1995)
- Gerd Engman (1995–2004)
- Sören Gunnarsson (2004–2008)
- Rose-Marie Frebran (2008–2015)
- Maria Larsson (2015–2022)
- Anna Olofsson (acting 2023–2023)
- Lena Rådström Baastad (1 March 2023–present)
