= Annelie Nordström =

Swedish politician (born 1955)

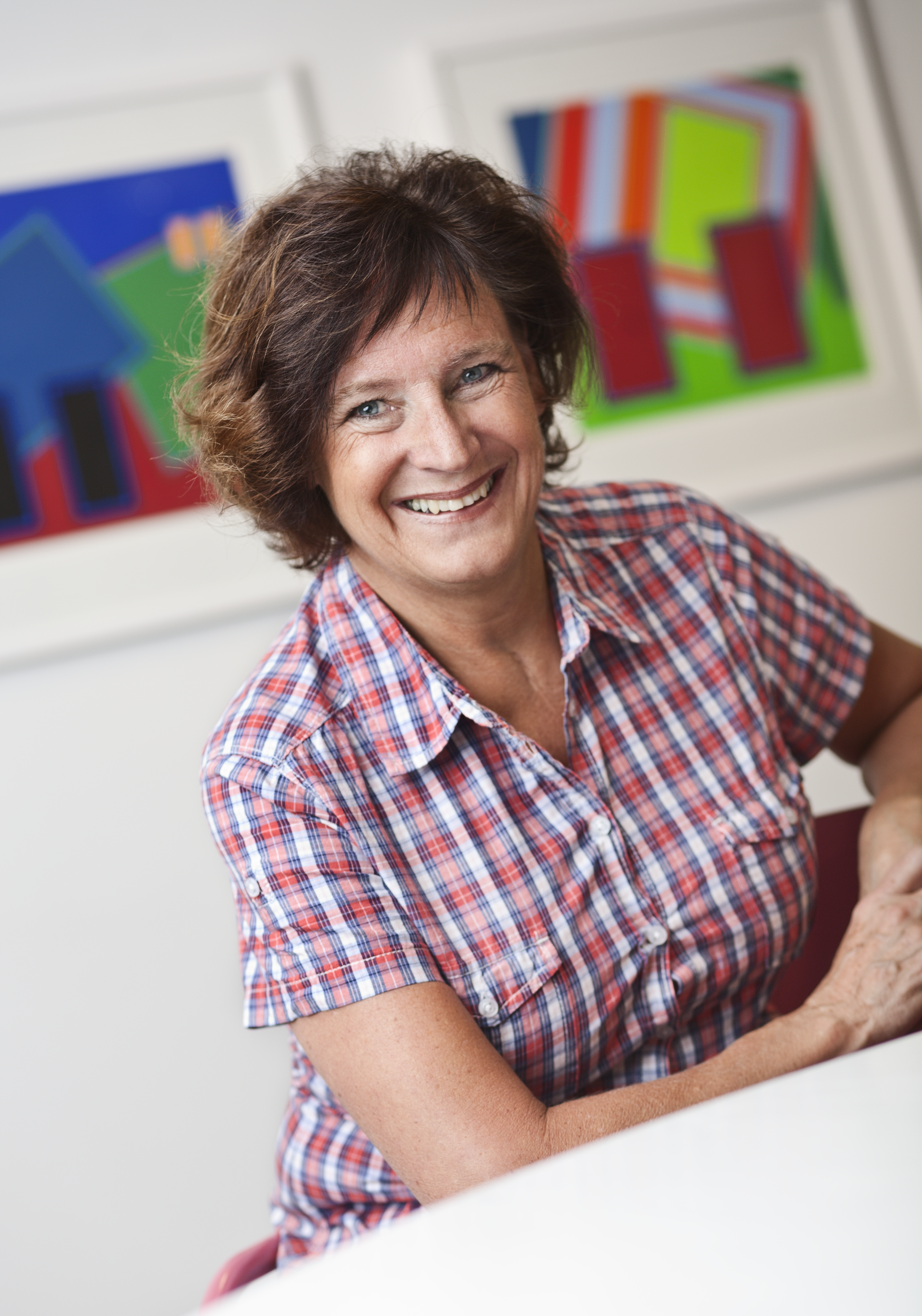
- Annelie Nordström (2011)
- Born: 12 July 1955 (age 71); Halmstad, Sweden
- Occupation: General secretary of the Swedish Municipal Workers' Union (Until May 2016)

Annelie Nordström, also Nordström Eriksson, (born 12 July 1955) is a Swedish politician who acted as general secretary of the Swedish Municipal Workers' Union from 2010 to 2016. She started her career as a child caretaker in Halmstad and was a trade union activist locally within the Municipal Workers Union between 1974 and 1980, and an ombudsman in Stockholm for some time in 1981. She moved to Vilhelmina, where she became personnel manager in Vilhelmina municipality between 1988 and 1998. She became active in the Social Democratic Party – first as a county politician between 1991 and 1998, then as councilor in Vilhelmina municipality between 1998 and 2000.

Nordström was a functionnaire at the Municipal Federal office in Stockholm between 2001 and 2005, vice chairman between 2009 and 2010, and Chairman of the Federation from 2010 onwards. She is a member of the boards of Trade Union Confederation in Sweden, Folksam and Arenagruppen.

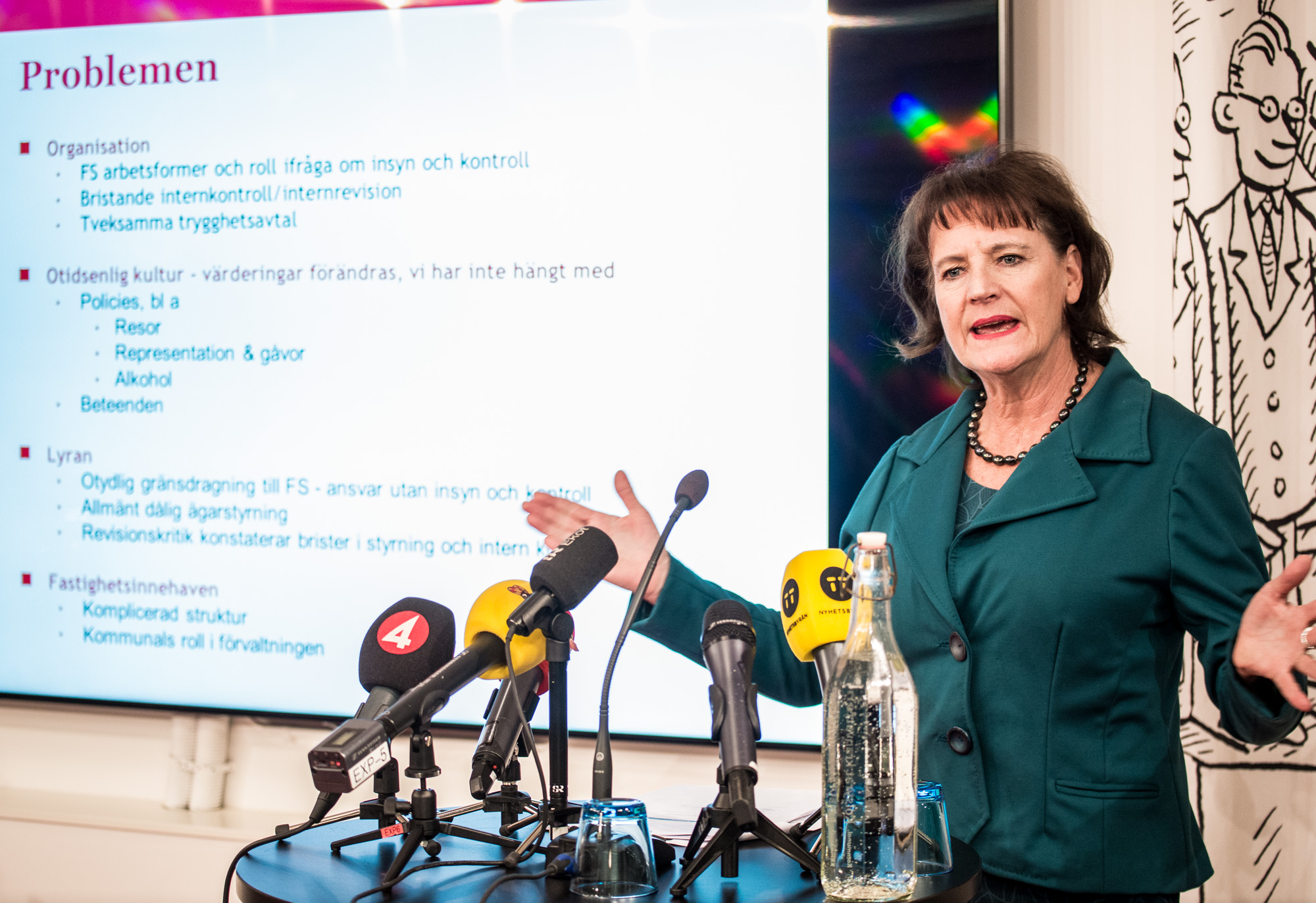
Annelie Nordström at a press conference on 20 January 2016 where she announced her resignation

Nordström received attention in January 2016 when the newspaper Aftonbladet publicized articles about the Swedish Municipal Workers' Union. People within the union had used the union funds for luxurious dinners and the hiring of porn star Puma Swede to perform a strip show at a restaurant owned by the union, which led to the dismissal of the union cashier. Many working members cancelled their memberships in the union after this scandal.

On 20 January, Nordström promised that changes would be made to make the union "healthy" and to change the "unhealthy" union culture. She also announced that she would not stand for re-election as general secretary of the union at the congress in May 2016, effectively resigning. She was succeeded in her role by Tobias Baudin.

Nordström had also offered the Swedish Social Democratic Party politician and minister Margot Wallström an apartment through the union, an offer Wallström accepted. This allowed her to bypass waiting for an apartment, which takes eight years on average, like ordinary renters must do in Sweden. Wallström replied that she acted in good faith and received a confirmation from the highest-ranking officials that all norms and rules had been followed. Wallström accused Nordström of not being truthful.

In December 2016, Nordström announced that she had left the Social Democrats and instead joined the Feminist Initiative party.

Nordström is married to Lars-Gustav Eriksson (born 1947).

Trade union offices
Preceded by Ylva Thörn	President of the Swedish Municipal Workers' Union; 2010–2016	Succeeded by Tobias Baudin
