= Helena Höij =

Swedish politician (born 1965)

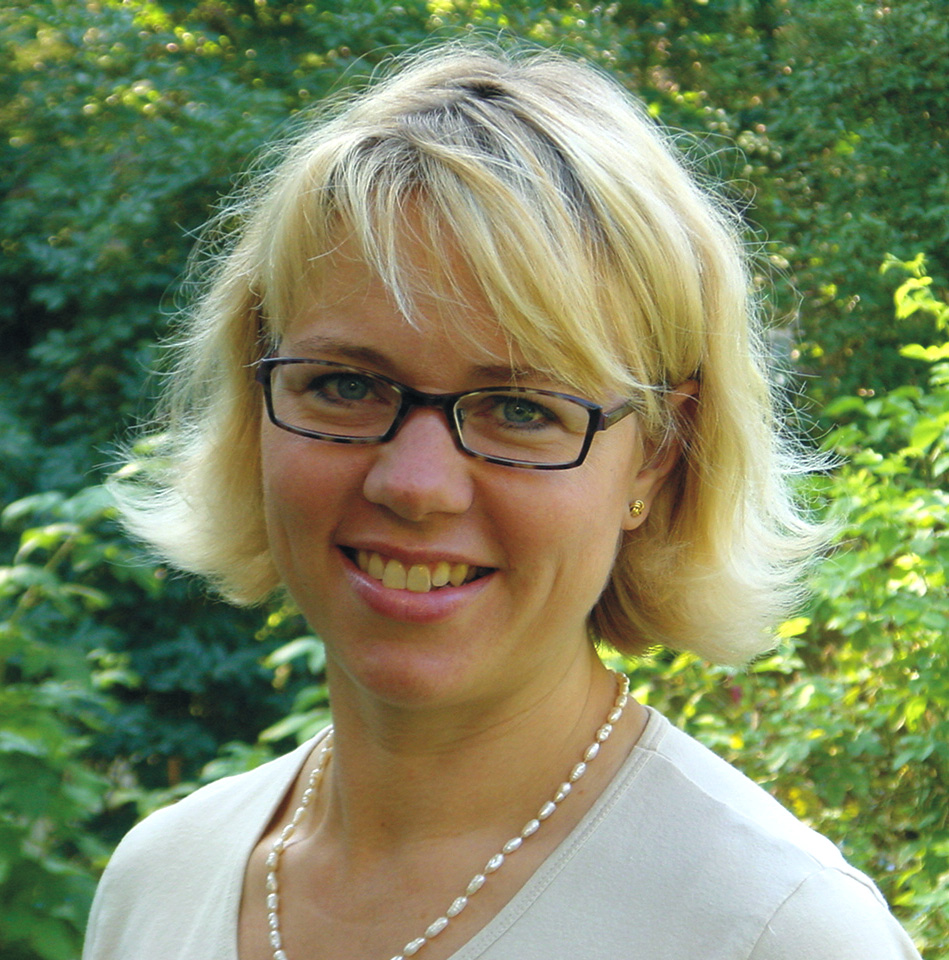

Governor of Dalarna County
- Incumbent
- Assumed office 1 November 2022
- Monarch: Carl XVI Gustaf
- Prime Minister: Ulf Kristersson
- Preceded by: Ylva Thörn

Member of Parliament
- In office 5 October 1998 – 2 October 2006
- Constituency: Stockholm Municipality

Personal details
- Born: 20 December 1965 (age 60) Angered, Västra Götaland County, Sweden
- Party: Christian Democrats
- Spouse: Magnus Höij
- Education: Institute of Technology at Linköping University

Helena Margareta Höij (born 20 December 1965) is a Swedish politician and civil servant who currently serves as Governor of Dalarna County since 1 November 2022.

A member of the Christian Democrats, she was Member of Parliament (MP) from 1998 to 2006, representing Stockholm Municipality. She was the Third Deputy Speaker of the Riksdag (Parliament) from 2002 to 2006.

Political offices
Preceded by Rose-Marie Frebran	Third Deputy Speaker of the Riksdag; 2002—2006	Succeeded by Liselott Hagberg
Government offices
Preceded by Ylva Thörn	Governor of Dalarna County; 2022—	Succeeded by Incumbent
