= Marianne Samuelsson =

Swedish politician (born 1945)

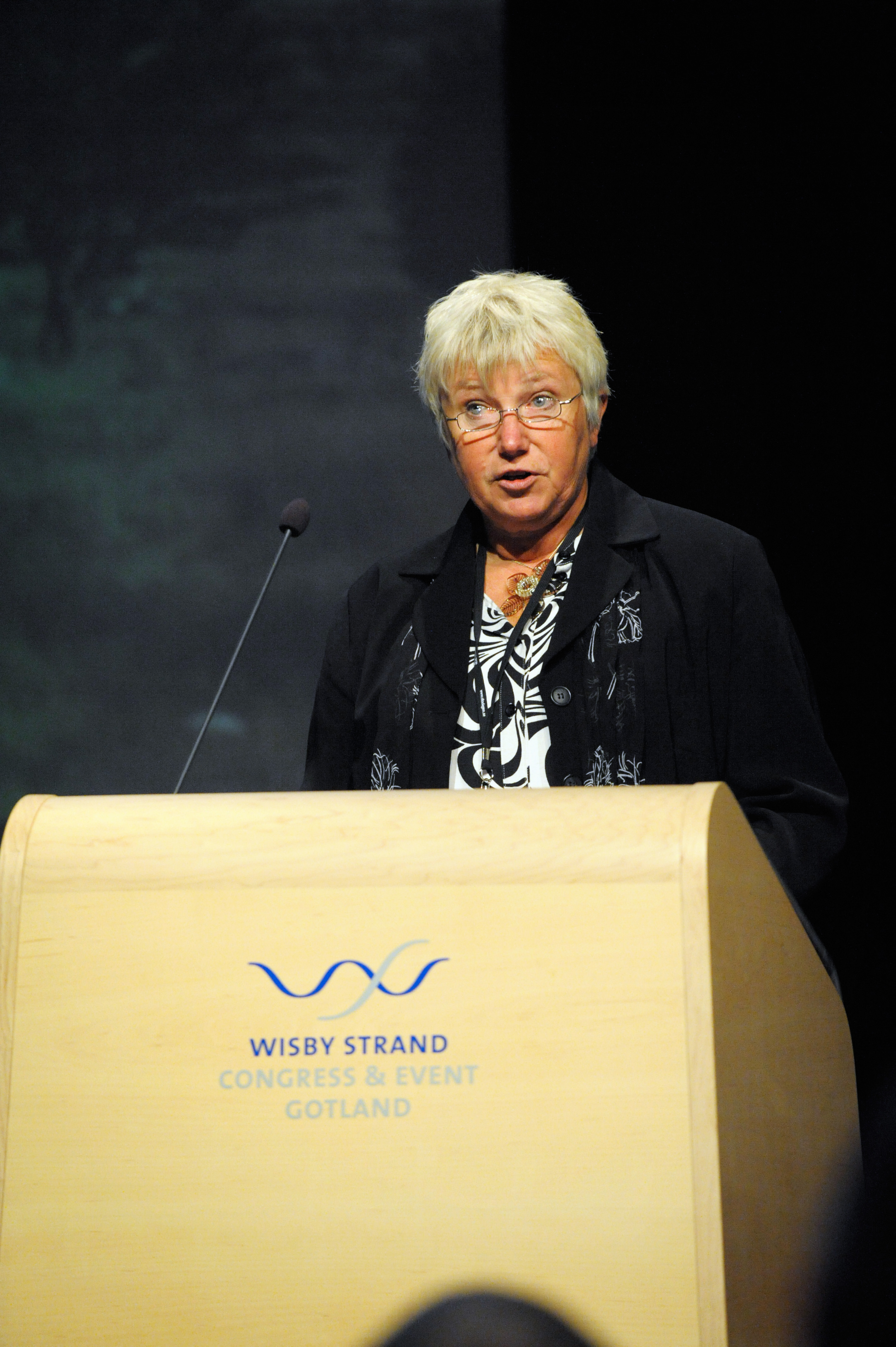

35th Governor of Gotland
- In office 2004–2009
- Appointed by: Cabinet of Göran Persson
- Preceded by: Lillemor Arvidsson
- Succeeded by: Cecilia Schelin Seidegård

Personal details
- Born: 9 December 1945 (age 80) Alingsås, Sweden
- Party: Green Party (Sweden)
- Profession: Politician
- Website: http://www.lansstyrelsen.se/gotland/

Marianne Samuelsson (born 9 December 1945) is a Swedish politician (Green Party) and was the governor of Gotland County until having to resign four months early, on 4 August 2009. She was previously a member of the Riksdag for the Green Party from 1988 to 1991, and from 1994 to 2002. She was spokesperson for the Green Party, together with Birger Schlaug, from 1992 to 1999.

The background to resigning the position of governor was that someone on her staff secretly recorded a discussion in which Samuelsson stated that Gotland County should provide special consideration for a "distinguished" industry leader who wanted to build a house close to the sea. This recording was handed over to the local radio station, which made it public. A media storm ensued, and Samuelsson eventually had to resign, in acknowledgement of several mistakes she made in handling the scandal - notably, in stating that her only mistake was to have said what she did so as it could be recorded.
