= List of governors of Gotland County =

Governor of Gotland County
- Landshövding i Gotlands län
- Coat of arms of Gotland County.

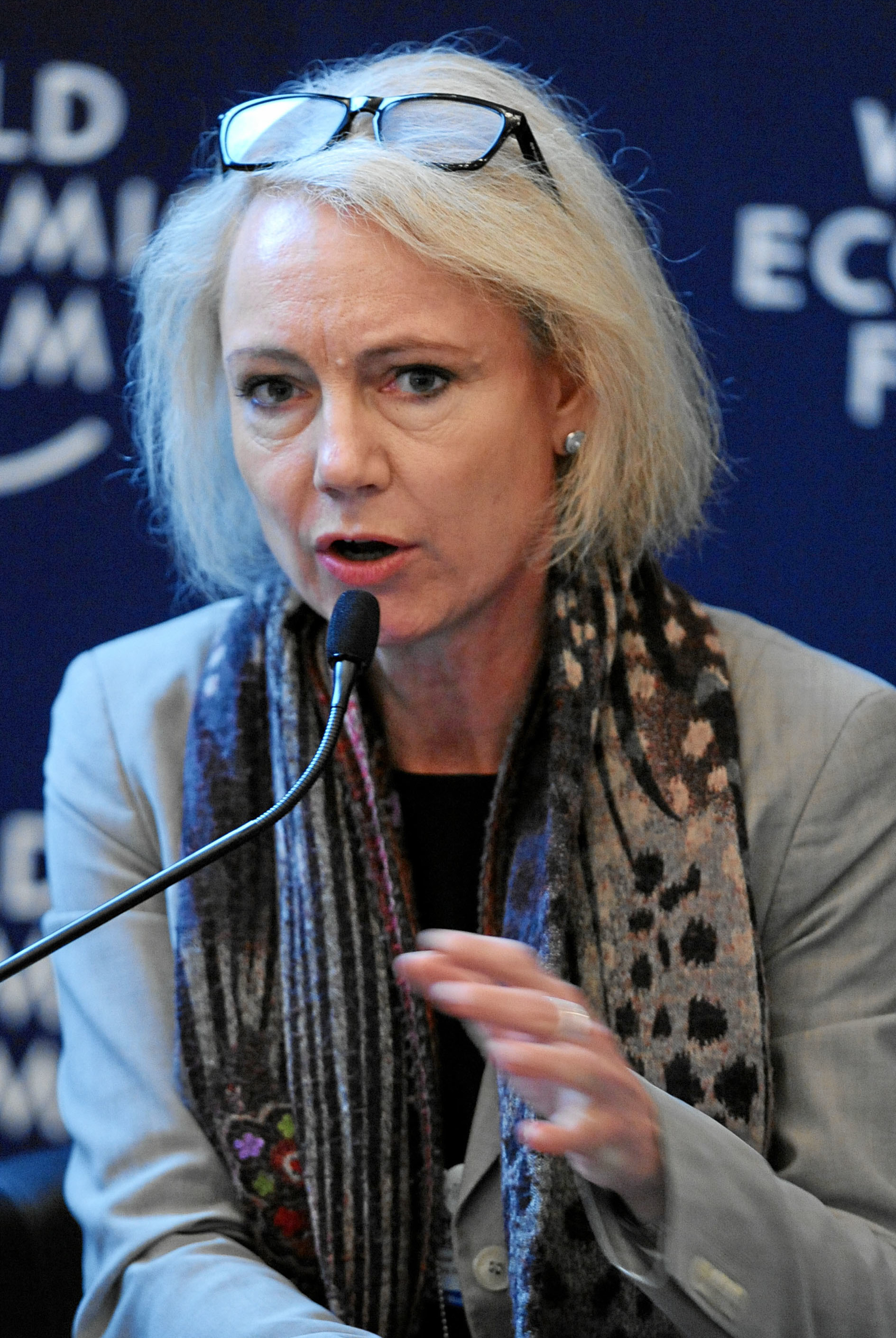
- Incumbent; Charlotte Petri Gornitzka since 1 November 2024
- Gotland County Administrative Board
- Residence: The residence in Visby, Visby
- Appointer: Government of Sweden
- Term length: Six years (Note: The governor is often appointed for a six-year mandate. It can be extended if the person has not reached retirement age.)
- Formation: 1689
- First holder: Gustaf Adolf von der Osten
- Deputy: County Director (Länsrådet)
- Salary: SEK 97,800/month (2017)
- Website: Governor of Gotland

This is a list of governors for Gotland County of Sweden, from 1689 to present.

Picture	Governor	Took office	Left office
	Gustaf Adolf von der Osten	1689	1708
	Anders Sparrfelt	1708	1710
	Peter Snack	1710	1711
	Nils Posse	1711	1716
	Gustaf von Psilander	5 October 1716	1728
	Johan Didrik Grönhagen	1728	1738
	Jacob von Hökerstedt	13 April 1738	1757
	Didrik Henrik Taube	1757	1763
	Mårten Kalling	1763	1765
	Carl Otto von Segebaden	1765	1787
	Salomon von Rajalin	31 August 1787	1812
	Carl Fredrik Aschling	1812	1817
	Jacob Cederström	11 March 1817	1833
	Michael Silvius von Hohenhausen	1833	1849
	Gustaf Jacob af Dalström	23 November 1849	17 July 1858
	Gillis Bildt	17 July 1858	1862
	Henrik Gyllenram	1862	1873
	Rudolf Horn	1874	1883
	Emil Poignant	1883	1900
	Conrad Cedercrantz	21 January 1901 (Note: Acting from 7 December 1900)	1903
	August Wall	1903	1909
	Karl Rydin	1909	1912
	Gustaf Roos	18 October 1912	30 September 1927
	Allan Rodhe	1927	1938
	Ola Jeppsson	26 September 1938	1941
	Erik Nylander	19 July 1941	1951
	Åke Hovgard	16 March 1951 (Note: Took office 1 April 1951.)	1959
	Martin Wahlbäck	1959	1968
	Torsten Andersson	1968	1974
	Einar Gustafsson	1975	1980
	Lars Westerberg	1980	1983
	Claes Elmstedt	1984	1991
	Thorsten Andersson	1992	1998
	Lillemor Arvidsson	15 January 1998	29 February 2004
	Marianne Samuelsson	1 July 2004	4 August 2009
	Cecilia Schelin Seidegård	1 January 2010	31 December 2018
	Anders Flanking	1 June 2019	1 November 2024
	Charlotte Petri Gornitzka	1 November 2024	Incumbent
