= Närke and Värmland County =

Former county in Sweden between 1634–1779

County of Närke and Värmland Närke och Värmlands län
- County of Sweden
- 1634–1779
- Flag
- Capital: Örebro
- History
  - Established: 1634
  - Disestablished: 1779
Succeeded by
County of Örebro; County of Värmland

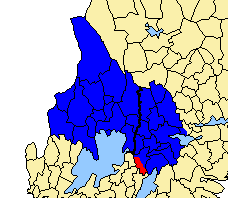
Närke and Värmland County 1654-1779 (blue). Marked in red is Tiveden, which later was added to Örebro County.

Närke and Värmland County (Swedish: Närkes och Värmlands län) was the earlier name of Örebro County in Sweden, between 1634 and 1779. In that year Värmland ceded to form Värmland County. Since Närke only corresponded the southern part of the remaining territory and the name was changed to reflect the city where the Governor resided, namely Örebro.

== See also about Sweden ==
- Counties of Sweden
- Provinces of Sweden
- List of Örebro Governors
