= Härnösand County =

Historic Swedish subdivision

Coordinates: 62.64°N 17.94°E

Härnösand County Härnösands län
- County of the Swedish Empire
- 1645–1654
- Flag
- Capital: Härnösand
- History
  - Established: 5 September 1645
  - Disestablished: 1654
Preceded by	Succeeded by
Norrland County	Västernorrland County

Härnösand County, or Härnösands län, was a county of the Swedish Empire, between 1645 and 1654. The seat of residence for the Governor was in Härnösand.

It included the Provinces of Ångermanland, Medelpad and Jämtland.

== Creation ==
The county was created in 1645 when Sweden conquered Jämtland and Härjedalen. They had previously belonged to Norway. Norrland County was split into two and the new territories were assigned to the two halves. Jämtland formed part of the new Härnösand County, and Härjedalen became part of Hudiksvall County. Nine years later they were merged again as the Västernorrland County.

== Governors ==
The county had two governors while it existed.

- 1645–1653 Hans Strijk
- 1653–1654 Anders Appelbom

When the county merged into Västernorrland Appelbom did not continue as governor. Instead Erik Larsson Sparre, who had governed Hudiksvall, took on the governorship.
