= Charlotte Petri Gornitzka =

Swedish politician

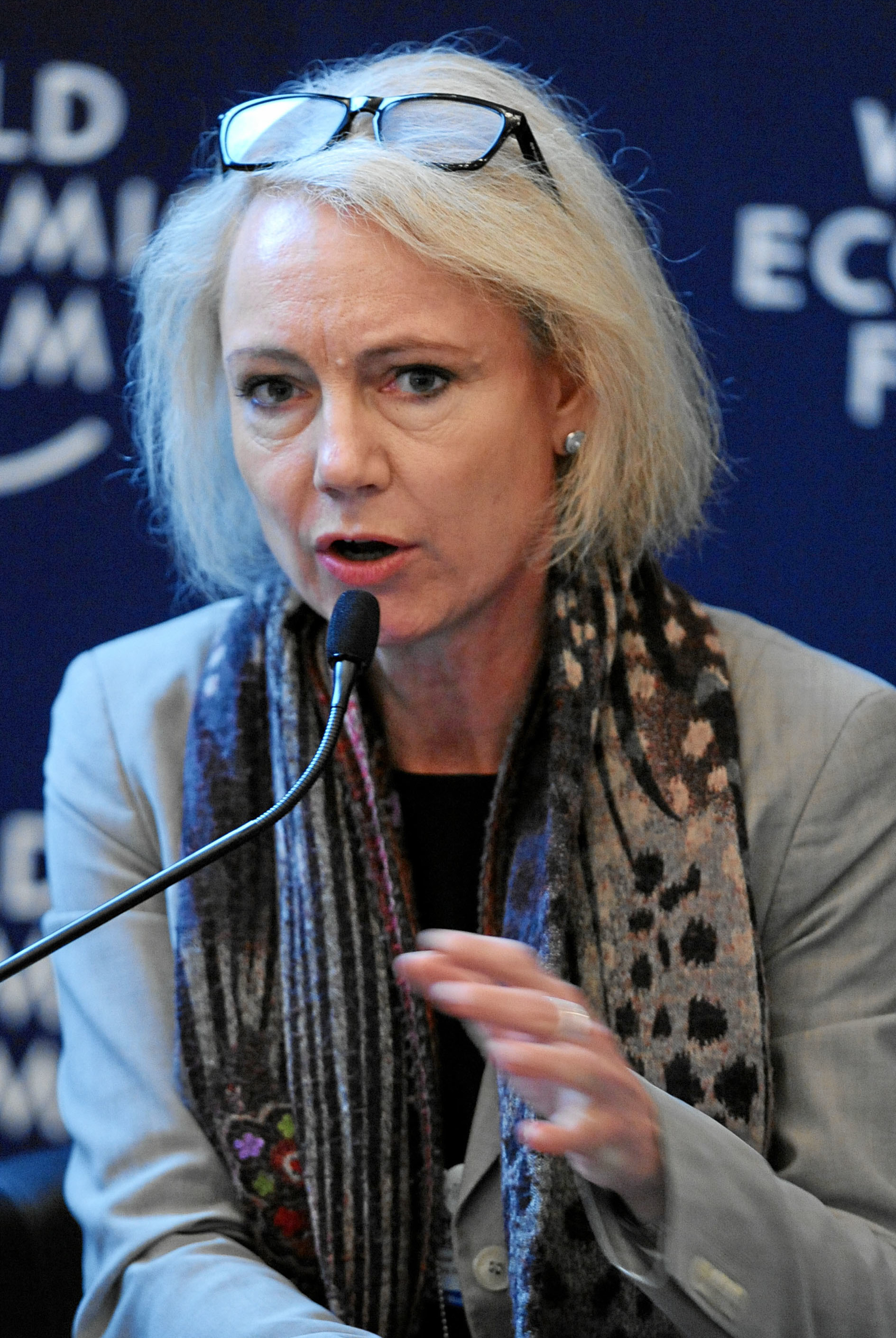
- Charlotte Petri Gornitzka in 2012.

37th Governor of Gotland County
- Incumbent
- Assumed office 1 November 2024
- Appointed by: Kristersson cabinet
- Preceded by: Anders Flanking

Chair of the Development Assistance Committee
- In office 2016–2018
- Preceded by: Erik Solheim
- Succeeded by: Susanna Moorehead

Personal details
- Party: Independent

Charlotte Petri Gornitzka is a Swedish management consultant and public administrator who serves as Governor of Gotland County since 2024 and served as Assistant Secretary-General of the United Nations and as deputy executive director of the United Nations Children's Fund (UNICEF) from 2018 to 2023. She previously chaired the Development Assistance Committee (DAC) of the OECD from 2016 until 2018.

== Early life and education ==
Petri Gornitzka has a background in management consulting with a focus on change management and communications. She holds a master's degree from Stockholm University College of Music Education (SMI) as well as a degree in Business and Marketing studies from IHM Business School.

== Career ==
From 1998-2002, Petri Gornitzka served as Under Secretary-General and Director of Communications for the Swedish Red Cross.

Petri Gornitzka later served as Secretary-General of Save the Children International (2008–2010) in London and Secretary-General of Save the Children Sweden (2003–2008).

Petri Gornitzka joined the Swedish public service and worked as Director-General of the Swedish International Development Cooperation Agency (SIDA) between 2010 and 2016. During that time, she became the initiator of "Swedish Leadership for Sustainable Development", a network of some twenty leading Swedish companies, three expert organizations and SIDA, working for sustainable development with the objective to reduce poverty.

In 2016, Petri Gornitzka took over from Erik Solheim as chair of the DAC. The country that nominates a Chair for the Committee also agrees to finance the position, and on 16 February 2018, Dagens Nyheter reported that Sweden's cost for this chairmanship was 12.4 million SEK (1.254 million EUR, 1.556 million USD).

== Other activities ==
- World Economic Forum (WEF), Global Future Council on the Future of International Governance, Public-Private Co-operation and Sustainable Development, Co-chair
- Stewardship Board for Economic Growth and Social Inclusion, Member
- 2030 Water Resources Group, Member of the Governing Council.
- Global Challenges Foundation, Member of the Board
