= Swedish Municipal Workers' Union =

Trade union in Sweden

Kommunal
- Swedish Municipal Workers' Union
- Svenska Kommunalarbetareförbundet
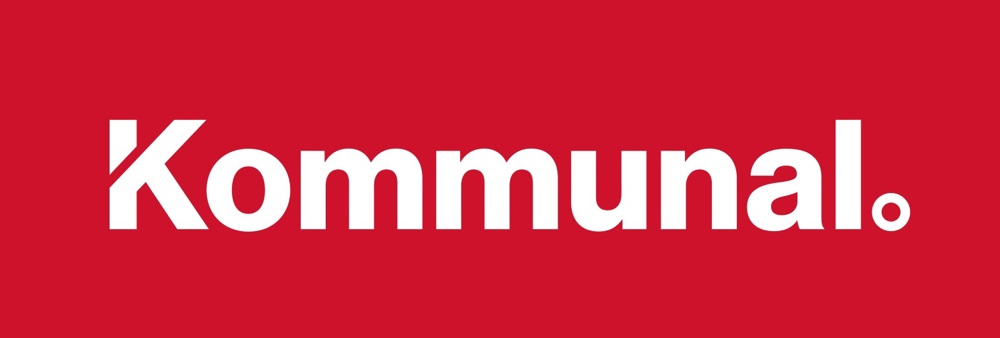

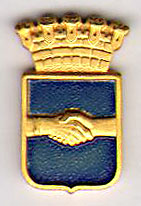
- Founded: 23 January 1910
- Headquarters: Stockholm
- Members: 510 000
- Key people: Malin Ragnegård, President
- Affiliations: LO, ITF, IUF, PSI
- Website: www.kommunal.se

The Swedish Municipal Workers' Union (Swedish: Svenska Kommunalarbetareförbundet), is the largest trade union in Sweden with 570,000 members, as of 2005. It was created 1910. It is commonly referred to as Kommunal ("Municipal").

The union was founded in Stockholm on 23 January 1910, as a split from the Swedish Factory Workers' Union. Like its predecessor, it affiliated to the Swedish Trade Union Confederation. It initially had 1,218 members, but the number grew rapidly. The Swedish Tramwaymen's Union left in 1917, but rejoined the following year. The Swedish Firefighters' Union joined in 1918, then the Swedish Hospital Staff Union split away in 1923, rejoining in 1945. By this point, the union had 59,426 members. The Swedish Vergers' Union joined in 1946, the State Hospital Personnel Union in 1967, the Swedish Chimney Sweeps' Union in 1981, and the Swedish Agricultural Workers' Union in 2001. Its peak membership was 651,670 in 1991. As of 2019, it had 500,560 members.

The majority of the members are employed by various local-level municipalities. Farm workers and co-operatives are also commonly found in this union. Some professions that this union represents are:

- Childcare employees
- Bus drivers
- Ambulance drivers
- Firefighters
- Elderly care workers

Kommunal was headed between 1996 and 2010 by general secretary Ylva Thörn. She was succeeded by Annelie Nordström. Nordström resigned from her post on 20 January 2016 after a corruption scandal involving the union's leadership was exposed.

As of 2005, 80% of the union's members are female. A third of the members are under 30 years of age. This is attributed to the representation of welfare jobs such as child and elderly care workers.

In recent history, this union has called two major strikes:

- From 28 September to 20 October 1995 a strike was called that affected the sports industry workers in Sweden greatly. Major league soccer and ice hockey was not able to start until the issue was resolved.
- Another strike was called in 2003, this time mainly affecting childcare workers.

Kommunal is a member of International Transport Workers' Federation (ITF), International Union of Food, Agricultural, Hotel, Restaurant, Catering, Tobacco and Allied Workers' Association (IUF) and Public Services International (PSI).

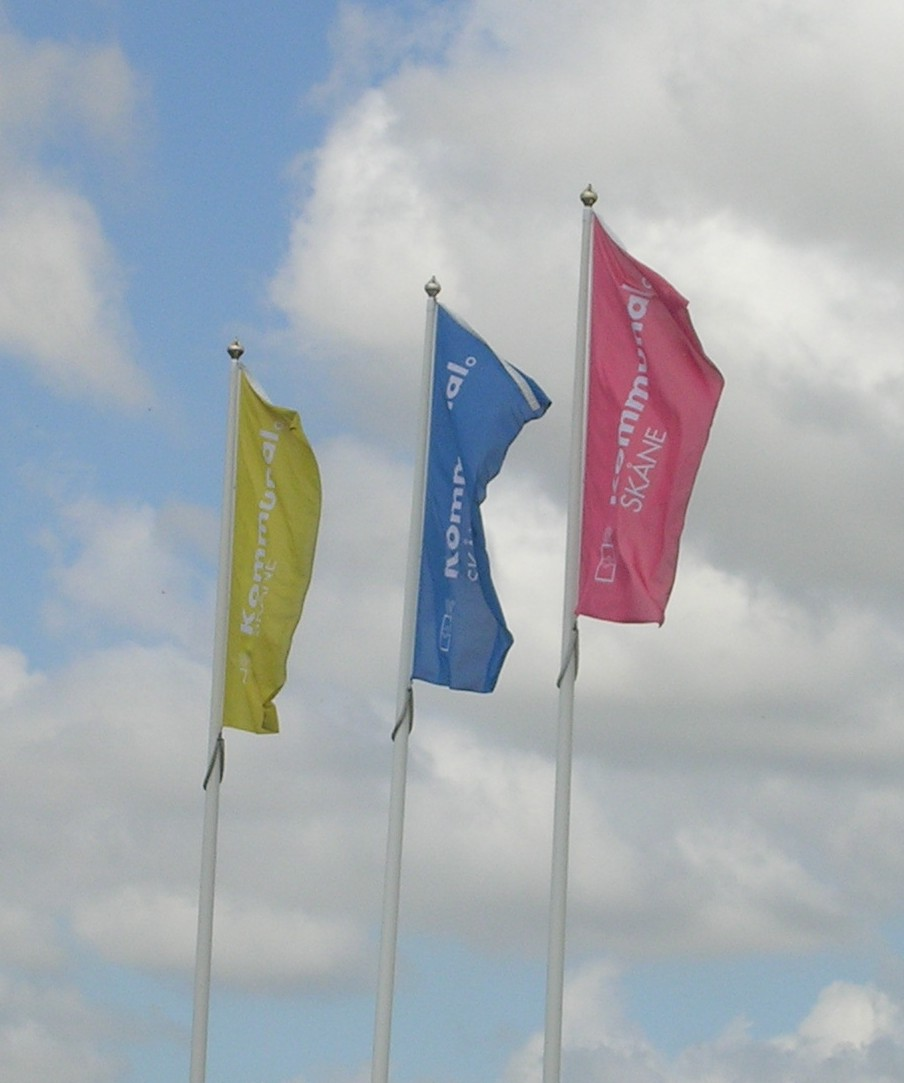
Union flags outside the Kommunal headquarters

== Chairs ==
1910: Ludvig Nordgren
1933: Curt Larsson
1936: Thure Andersson
1937: Peter Söderberg
1948: Gunnar Hallström
1973: Bengt Blomdahl
1978: Sigvard Marjasin
1988: Lillemor Arvidsson
1995: Sten Törnblom
1996: Ylva Thörn
2010: Annelie Nordström
2016: Tobias Baudin
2021: Malin Ragnegård
