= Maria Norrfalk =

Swedish civil servant

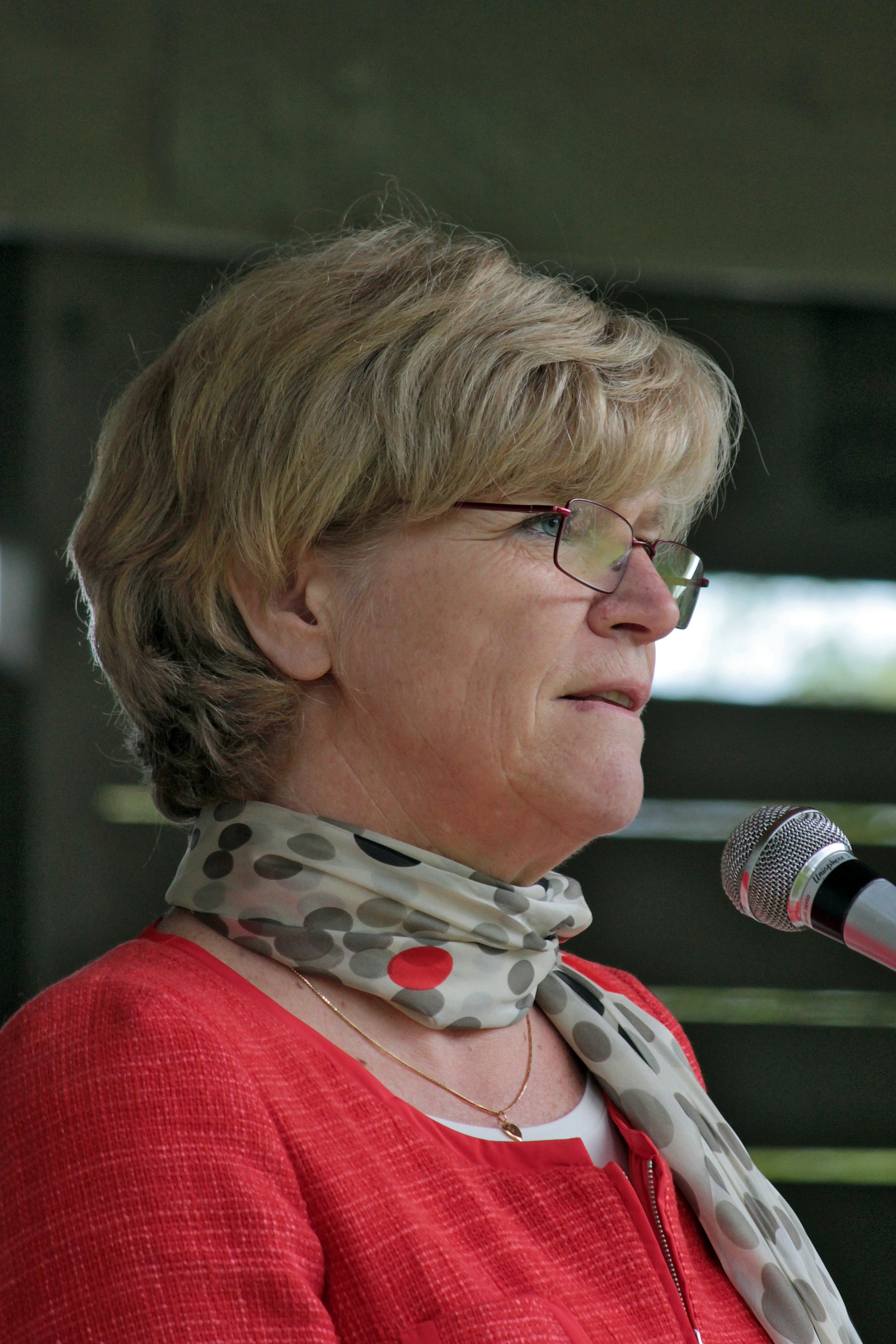
- Maria Norrfalk 2012

38th Governor of Dalarna
- In office 21 May 2007 – 31 August 2015
- Appointed by: Cabinet of Fredrik Reinfeldt
- Preceded by: Ingrid Dahlberg

Personal details
- Born: March 25, 1952 (age 74)
- Profession: Forester
- Website: http://www.w.lst.se/

Maria Norrfalk (born March 25, 1952), is a Swedish civil servant who was Governor of Dalarna County in Sweden from 2007 to 2015. Norrfalk was educated as a forester, and served as Director General of the Swedish Forest Agency from 1994 to 2003. From 2003 to 2007 Norrfalk was the Director General of the Swedish International Development Cooperation Agency, and from 2007 she has been the Governor of Dalarna County.
