= Åsa Regnér =

Swedish politician (born 1964)

- Regnér in 2026

Minister for Children and the Elderly
- In office 3 October 2014 – 8 March 2018
- Monarch: Carl XVI Gustaf
- Prime Minister: Stefan Löfven
- Preceded by: Maria Larsson
- Succeeded by: Lena Hallengren

Minister for Gender Equality
- In office 3 October 2014 – 8 March 2018
- Monarch: Carl XVI Gustaf
- Prime Minister: Stefan Löfven
- Preceded by: Maria Arnholm
- Succeeded by: Lena Hallengren

Personal details
- Born: 26 August 1964 (age 62) Gällivare, Sweden
- Party: Social Democrats

Åsa Charlotte Regnér (born Pettersson, born 26 August 1964) is a Swedish Social Democratic politician.

On 3 October 2014, she became Minister for Children and the Elderly and Minister for Gender Equality under Stefan Löfven.

On 6 March 2018, Regnér resigned from her position in the Swedish government upon becoming the Deputy Executive Director of UN Women.

Government offices
Preceded by Maria Larsson	Minister for Children and the Elderly; 2014–2018	Succeeded by Lena Hallengren
Preceded by Maria Larsson	Minister for Gender Equality; 2014–2018	Succeeded by Lena Hallengren
