= Hudiksvall County =

Historical county in Sweden

Coordinates: 61.73°N 17.12°E

Hudiksvall County Hudiksvalls län
- County of the Swedish Empire
- 1645–1654
- Flag
- Capital: Hudiksvall
- History
  - Established: 5 September 1645
  - Disestablished: 1654
Preceded by	Succeeded by
Norrland County	Västernorrland County

Hudiksvall County, or Hudiksvalls län, was a county of the Swedish Empire, between 1645 and 1654. It was created by splitting the Norrland County into the Hudiksvall County and the Härnösand County, but just nine years later they were merged again as the Västernorrland County. The seat of residence for the Governor was in Hudiksvall.

It included the provinces of Gästrikland, Hälsingland and Härjedalen. That constellation seceded once again to form County of Gävleborg in 1762.
