= Långasjö =

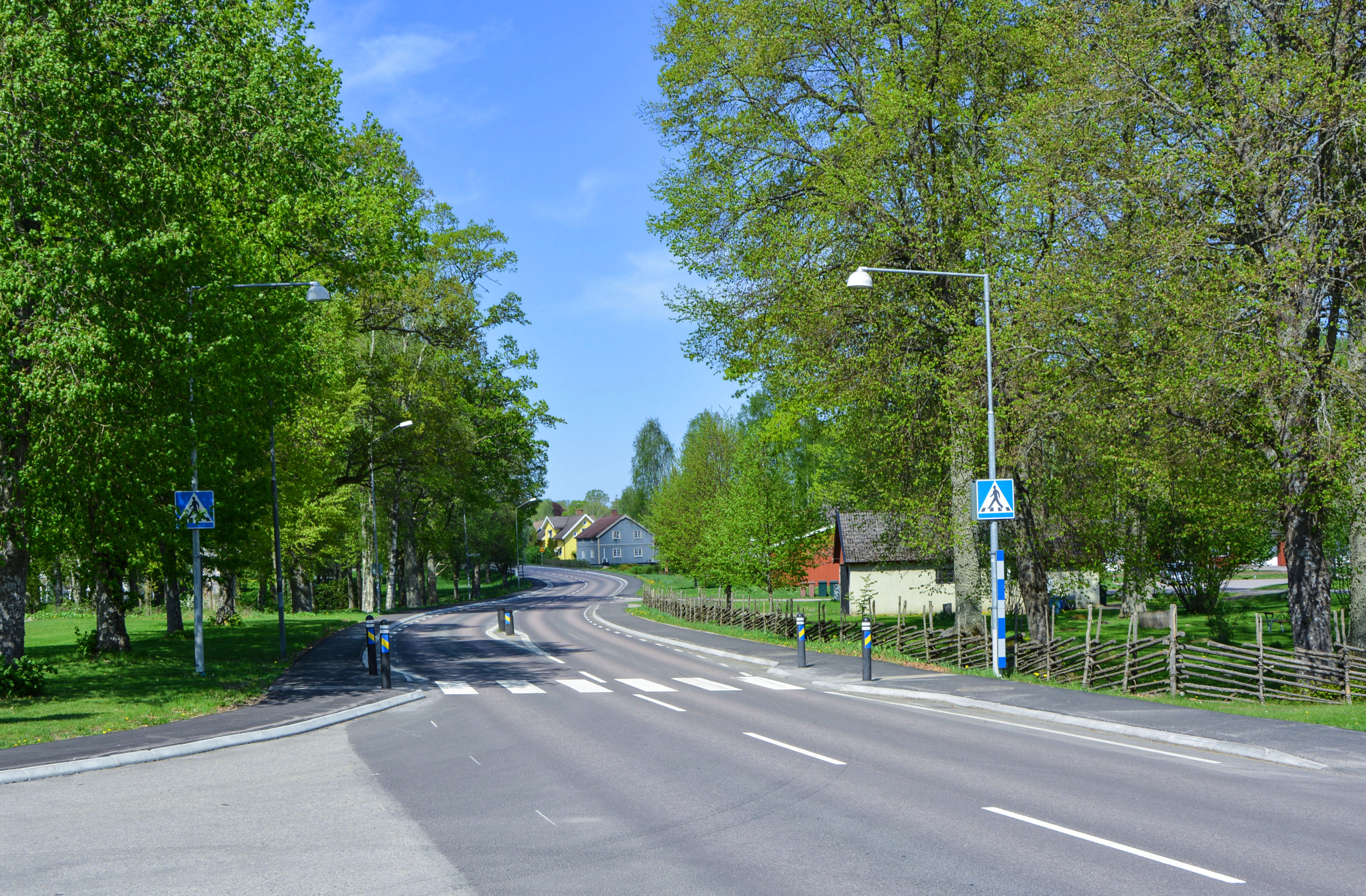

- Location within Kalmar Location within Sweden
- Coordinates: 56°35′N 15°26′E
- Country: Sweden
- Province: Småland
- County: Kalmar County
- Municipality: Emmaboda Municipality

Area
  - Total: 0.75 km^{2} (0.29 sq mi)

Population (31 December 2010)
  - Total: 348
  - Density: 464/km^{2} (1,200/sq mi)
- Time zone: UTC+1 (CET)
  - Summer (DST): UTC+2 (CEST)

Långasjö is a locality situated in Emmaboda Municipality, Kalmar County, Sweden with 348 inhabitants in 2010.
