= Red-Greens (Sweden) =

Political alliance in Sweden

Red-Greens De Rödgröna
- Social Democrats (full member): Magdalena Andersson
- Green Party (full member): Daniel Helldén; Amanda Lind
- Left Party (collaborating, not a member): Nooshi Dadgostar
- Founded: 7 December 2008; 2014 (revived)
- Ideology: Social democracy (S); Green politics (MP); Socialism (V)
- Political position: Centre-left to left-wing
- Colours: Red, green
- Riksdag: 151 / 349

The Red-Greens (Swedish: De rödgröna) is an umbrella term which refers to the three centre-left to left-wing political parties of Sweden: the Social Democrats (S), the Left Party (V) and the Green Party (MP). The term originates from the launch of a left-wing political and electoral alliance between the parties on 7 December 2008.

This alliance, which was largely based on the Norwegian Red-Green Coalition, consisted of the Social Democrats, the Green Party and the Left Party which were in opposition to the centre-right Alliance coalition government. The three component parties of the Red-Greens, which faced the voters as three separate parties in the 2010 general election, aimed to reach agreements on significant areas of policy before the election. The parties aimed to achieve a majority in the following Swedish general election on 19 September 2010, in an unsuccessful bid to form a coalition government. The Red-Green pact was put to a pause on 26 October 2010, and was completely dissolved (according to a spokesperson for the Green Party) on 26 November.

The Red-Greens as a political alliance was revived following the 2014 general election, in the form of a coalition government - the Löfven Cabinet. The government consisted of the Social Democrats and Greens and was supported in the Riksdag by the Left Party. The three parties won 144 out of 349 Riksdag seats in the 2018 general election; 100 Social Democrat and 16 Green with the support of 28 Left.

== Parties ==
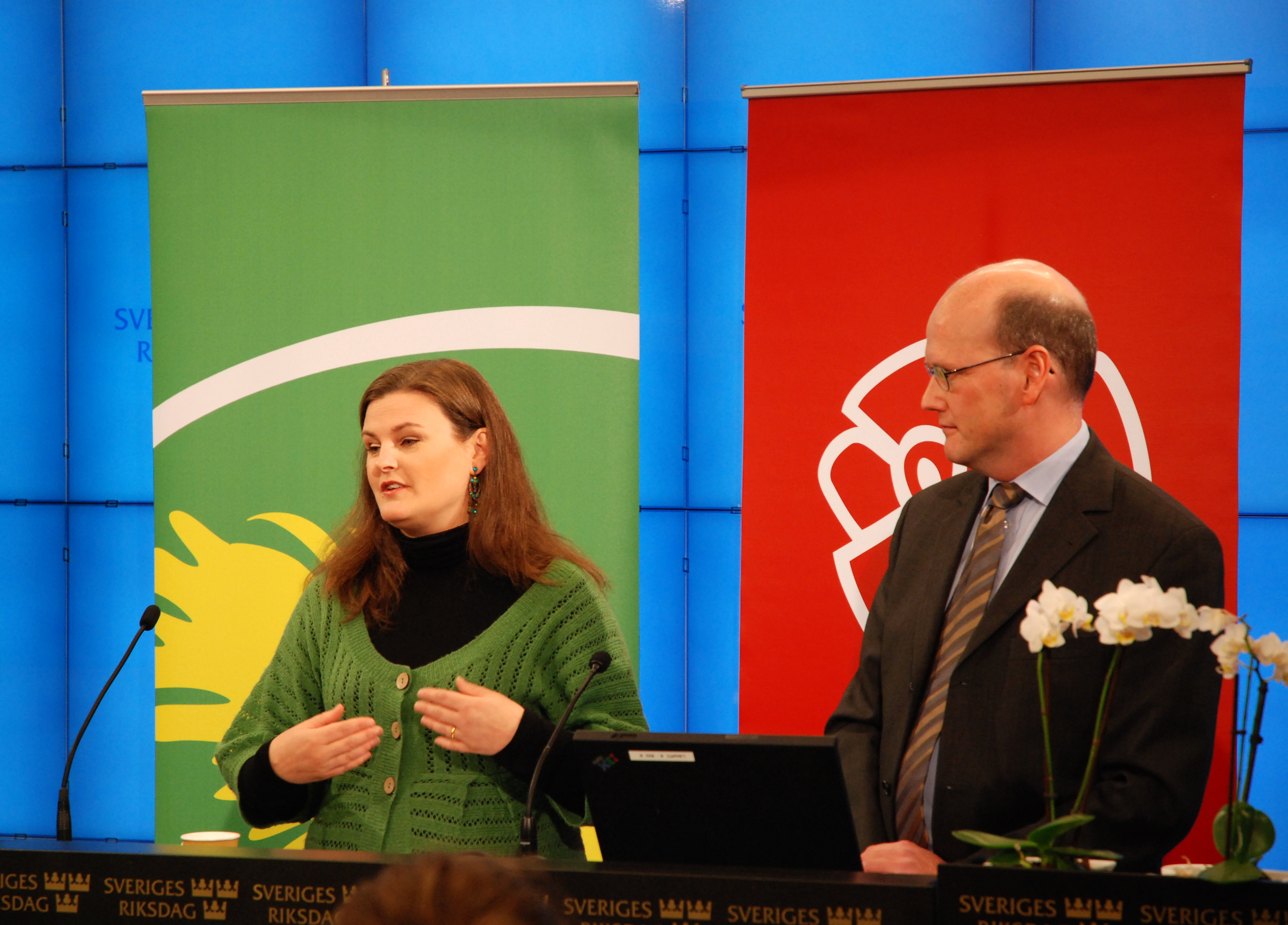
Mikaela Valtersson (Green) and Thomas Östros (Social Democrat) present the two parties' joint 2009 shadow budget in October 2008. At this stage the Left Party was not yet part of the cooperation.

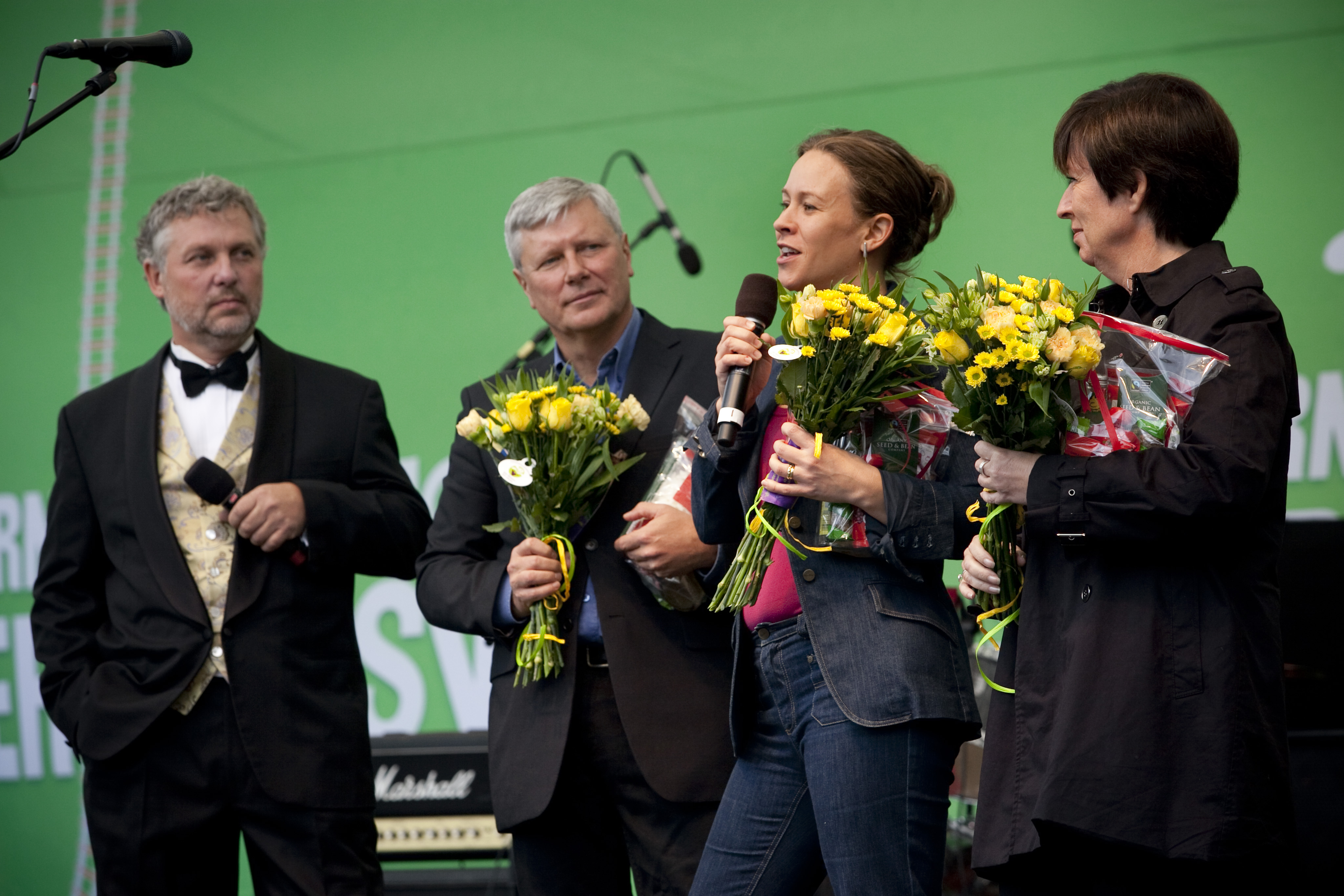
The leaders/spokespersons of the parties in Kungsträdgården, Stockholm, 2010. From left to right: Eriksson, Ohly, Wetterstrand and Sahlin.

The coalition consists of two parties and one supporting non-member;

=== Membership ===
- The Social Democrats led by Stefan Löfven, a social democratic party which has 100 of 349 seats in the Riksdag.
- The Green Party represented by spokespersons Isabella Lövin and Gustav Fridolin, a green party which had 16 of 349 seats in the Riksdag.

==== Support but would not join the government ====
- The Left Party led by Nooshi Dadgostar, a socialist party which has 28 of 349 seats in the Riksdag.

=== Other ===
- The Feminist Initiative led by Gudrun Schyman and Gita Nabavi, a radical feminist party which only won seats in thirteen municipalities, including in Sweden's largest cities of Gothenburg and Stockholm where it became part of governing "red-green-pink" coalitions. F! is also part of the Progressive Alliance of Socialists and Democrats like SAP.
- The Kiruna Party led by Lars Törnman (until 2010), a regional social democratic party which was active in Kiruna Municipality as part of a KIP-MP-V municipal government between 2002 and 2006, and as part of a KIP-Red-Green government between 2008 and 2010.

== Background ==
The Red-Greens took their cue from the centre-right Alliance, the co-operation between four centre-right parties which is considered to have contributed to these parties' success in the 2006 general election. The cooperation represented a significant development since the Social Democrats, especially the party leadership of Mona Sahlin, previously have been sceptical about too close a co-operation with the Left Party, which was officially a Communist Party until 1990. The Social Democratic minority government led by Göran Persson before the 2006 election had much closer cooperation with the Green Party than with the Left Party.

In October 2008 a deeper co-operation between the Social Democrats and the Green Party was announced, and a common shadow budget for 2009 was presented. In December 2008, the Left Party was included in the co-operation and the Red-Greens was launched. In the 2010 election, the Red-Greens lost 22 seats in comparison with 2006 elections. The Social Democrats lost 5%, thus scoring their worst result since 1914. The Green Party made a significant transformation from the smallest elected party to the third largest party during the term, overtaking the Left Party, the Christian Democrats, the Liberals and the Centre Party.

The Red-Green pact lost in 2010 elections and was put on pause on 26 October 2010, and completely dissolved (according to a spokesperson for the Green Party) on 26 November. In the 2014 election, The Social Democrats were the largest party, but they did not have enough seats to form a majority, prompting them to make a deal with the Green Party in order to form a coalition. They sought support from the Left Party, reviving the alliance between the Social Democrats and The Greens. A minority government, the coalition which only held 138 out of 349 seats depended on the support from the Left Party and the opposing Alliance parties. The Red-Greens participated together in 2018 election, receiving 144 seats. This is the worst result of the left-wing parties since 1914.

== Election results ==
=== Riksdag ===
Election	Votes	%	Seats	+/-	Status
1991	2,494,717	45.6	154 / 349	▼14	in opposition
1994	3,135,935	56.4	201 / 349	▲47	Social Democrat minority
1998	2,782,136	52.9	190 / 349	▼11	Social Democrat minority
2002	2,804,806	53.0	191 / 349	▲1	Social Democrat minority
2006	2,558,468	46.1	171 / 349	▼20	in opposition
2010	2,598,985	43.6	156 / 349	▼15	in opposition
2014	2,697,407	43.5	159 / 349	▲3	Social Democrat and Green minority
2018	2,634,739	40.7	144 / 349	▼15	Social Democrat and Green minority
2022	2,730,766	42.2	149 / 349	▲5	in opposition
2026	2,879,077	42.5	151 / 349	▲2	

== See also ==
- Alliance (Sweden)
- Red-red-green coalition
- Red–green alliance
- Red–green coalition (Norway)
