= Results of the 2014 Swedish general election =

Sweden held a general election on 14 September 2014.

== National results ==
Party	Votes	%	+/–	Seats			
Party	Votes	%	+/–	Con.	Lev.	Tot.	+/–
Swedish Social Democratic Party	1,932,711	31.01	+0.35	113	0	113	+1
Moderate Party	1,453,517	23.33	−6.74	84	0	84	−23
Sweden Democrats	801,178	12.86	+7.16	49	0	49	+29
Green Party	429,275	6.89	−0.45	16	9	25	0
Centre Party	380,937	6.11	−0.44	21	1	22	−1
Left Party	356,331	5.72	+0.11	10	11	21	+2
Liberal People's Party	337,773	5.42	−1.63	10	9	19	−5
Christian Democrats	284,806	4.57	−1.03	7	9	16	−3
Feminist Initiative	194,719	3.12	+2.72	0	0	0	0
Pirate Party	26,515	0.43	−0.22	0	0	0	0
Unity	6,277	0.10	+0.09	0	0	0	0
Party of the Swedes	4,189	0.07	+0.06	0	0	0	0
Animals' Party	4,093	0.07	New	0	0	0	New
Christian Values Party	3,553	0.06	New	0	0	0	New
Independent Rural Party	3,450	0.06	+0.03	0	0	0	0
Swedish Senior Citizen Interest Party	3,369	0.05	−0.13	0	0	0	0
Direct Democrats	1,417	0.02	+0.02	0	0	0	0
Classical Liberal Party	1,210	0.02	+0.01	0	0	0	0
Vägvalet	1,037	0.02	New	0	0	0	New
Socialist Justice Party	791	0.01	−0.01	0	0	0	0
Communist Party	558	0.01	±0.00	0	0	0	0
Progressive Party	196	0.00	New	0	0	0	New
European Workers Party	140	0.00	±0.00	0	0	0	0
Health Party	131	0.00	New	0	0	0	New
Peace Democrats	56	0.00	New	0	0	0	New
Yellow Party	35	0.00	New	0	0	0	New
New Party	32	0.00	New	0	0	0	New
Libertarian Justice Party	32	0.00	New	0	0	0	New
Scania Party	28	0.00	±0.00	0	0	0	0
The New Swedes	18	0.00	New	0	0	0	New
Reformist Neutral Party	11	0.00	New	0	0	0	0
Republicans	9	0.00	±0.00	0	0	0	0
Animal Owner Party	3	0.00	New	0	0	0	New
Human Democrats	2	0.00	New	0	0	0	New
Write-in votes	3,174	0.05	−0.05	0	0	0	–
Total	6,231,573	100.00	–	310	39	349	0
Valid votes	6,231,573	99.07					
Invalid/blank votes	58,443	0.93					
Total votes	6,290,016	100.00					
Registered voters/turnout	7,330,432	85.81					
Source: Election Authority

== Regional results ==
=== Percentage share ===
Location	Turnout	Share	Votes	S	M	SD	MP	C	V	FP	KD	F!	Other	Left	Right
Götaland	85.7	48.0	2,989,402	30.0	23.2	14.9	6.6	6.3	5.1	5.3	4.9	2.8	1.0	41.7	39.6
Svealand	85.9	39.7	2,471,374	28.4	26.0	10.9	7.8	5.7	5.8	6.1	4.6	3.7	1.0	42.1	42.4
Norrland	85.9	12.4	770,797	43.2	15.3	11.3	5.1	6.7	7.8	3.6	3.5	2.6	0.9	56.1	29.1
Total	85.8	100.0	6,231,573	31.0	23.3	12.9	6.9	6.1	5.7	5.4	4.6	3.1	1.0	43.6	39.4
Source: val.se

=== By votes ===
Location	Turnout	Share	Votes	S	M	SD	MP	C	V	FP	KD	F!	Other	Left	Right
Götaland	85.7	48.0	2,989,402	897,090	692,279	444,495	196,217	189,254	153,127	158,410	145,330	83,387	29,813	1,246,434	1,185,273
Svealand	85.9	39.7	2,471,374	702,546	643,385	269,345	193,535	139,857	143,248	151,738	112,804	91,005	23,911	1,039,329	1,047,784
Norrland	85.9	12.4	770,797	333,075	117,853	87,338	39,523	51,826	59,956	27,625	26,672	20,327	6,602	432,554	223,976
Total	85.8	100.0	6,231,573	1,932,711	1,453,417	801,178	429,275	380,937	356,331	337,773	284,806	194,719	60,326	2,718,317	2,457,033
Source: val.se

== Results by statistical area ==
=== Percentage share ===
Location	Share	Votes	S	M	SD	MP	C	V	FP	KD	F!	Other	Left	Right
East Middle Sweden	16.9	1,054,110	33.4	21.6	13.7	6.6	5.9	5.4	5.1	4.6	2.6	1.0	45.4	37.2
Middle Norrland	3.9	245,826	44.0	16.4	10.9	4.8	8.3	5.9	3.2	3.3	2.3	0.8	54.7	31.2
North Middle Sweden	8.8	550,503	37.6	18.7	15.1	5.1	7.3	5.9	3.8	3.6	2.2	0.9	48.5	33.3
Småland & Islands	8.7	543,848	33.1	20.7	14.6	5.3	8.8	4.4	3.5	7.0	1.9	0.8	42.7	40.1
Stockholm County	21.5	1,341,760	23.0	30.5	8.4	9.2	5.0	6.0	7.4	4.9	4.6	1.0	38.2	47.8
South Sweden	14.4	899,882	29.3	24.1	18.0	6.6	4.8	4.4	5.5	3.4	2.8	1.0	40.4	37.8
Upper Norrland	5.5	341,456	45.3	13.4	9.1	5.4	5.6	9.8	3.8	3.7	3.1	0.8	60.5	26.4
West Sweden	20.1	1,254,188	28.6	23.7	12.9	7.1	6.4	6.0	6.0	5.0	3.3	1.1	41.7	41.1
Total	100.0	6,231,573	31.0	23.3	12.9	6.9	6.1	5.7	5.4	4.6	3.1	1.0	43.6	39.4
Source: val.se

=== By votes ===
Location	Share	Votes	S	M	SD	MP	C	V	FP	KD	F!	Other	Left	Right
East Middle Sweden	16.9	1,054,110	352,209	227,706	144,785	70,025	62,309	56,692	53,586	48,683	27,616	10,499	478,926	392,284
Middle Norrland	3.9	245,826	108,280	40,346	26,793	11,833	20,409	14,463	7,810	8,216	5,610	2,066	134,576	76,781
North Middle Sweden	8.8	550,503	206,866	102,685	83,350	27,988	40,136	32,243	20,721	19,621	11,926	4,967	267,097	183,163
Småland & Islands	8.7	543,848	179,810	112,810	79,154	28,948	47,972	23,687	19,304	37,848	10,099	4,216	232,445	217,934
Stockholm County	21.5	1,341,760	308,530	409,782	112,492	123,978	67,099	80,378	99,131	65,183	62,061	13,126	512,886	641,195
South Sweden	14.4	899,882	263,586	217,081	161,627	59,568	43,632	39,967	49,160	30,473	25,614	9,174	363,121	340,346
Upper Norrland	5.5	341,456	154,645	45,596	31,216	18,452	19,173	33,439	12,975	12,525	10,664	2,771	206,536	90,269
West Sweden	20.1	1,254,188	358,785	297,511	161,761	88,483	80,207	75,462	75,086	62,257	41,129	13,507	522,730	515,061
Total	100.0	6,231,573	1,932,711	1,453,417	801,178	429,275	380,937	356,331	337,773	284,806	194,719	60,326	2,718,317	2,457,033
Source: val.se

== Constituency results ==
=== Percentage share ===
Location	Land	Turnout	Share	Votes	S	M	SD	MP	C	V	FP	KD	F!	Other	Left	Right
Blekinge	G	86.8	1.6	102,225	37.2	19.4	18.5	4.9	5.7	4.6	3.9	3.4	1.7	0.8	46.7	32.4
Dalarna	S	86.2	3.0	184,911	35.4	19.0	16.8	5.1	7.8	5.8	3.4	3.5	2.3	1.0	46.3	33.7
Gothenburg	G	82.8	5.4	334,294	23.7	23.9	9.6	9.8	3.8	9.4	7.2	4.6	6.5	1.5	42.9	39.5
Gotland	G	86.5	0.6	39,655	32.2	21.3	8.2	7.2	13.4	5.8	3.8	2.8	4.4	0.8	45.2	41.2
Gävleborg	N	85.4	2.9	183,515	38.2	17.4	16.0	5.0	6.7	6.6	3.7	3.2	2.2	1.0	49.8	31.0
Halland	G	87.5	3.3	206,559	28.4	27.7	12.9	5.9	8.4	3.8	5.7	4.4	1.8	1.1	38.0	46.2
Jämtland	N	85.3	1.3	83,714	39.8	17.3	11.0	5.7	11.3	6.3	2.8	2.5	2.4	0.8	51.7	34.0
Jönköping	G	87.0	3.6	224,596	31.8	20.3	14.6	5.4	7.9	3.9	3.6	10.4	1.4	0.7	41.1	42.2
Kalmar	G	86.7	2.5	158,822	35.5	20.3	15.3	4.7	8.7	4.6	3.5	4.7	1.9	0.8	44.7	37.3
Kronoberg	G	86.7	1.9	120,775	32.4	21.9	15.6	5.4	9.1	4.5	3.4	5.0	1.8	0.8	42.4	39.4
Malmö	G	79.7	2.9	179,103	29.3	23.2	13.5	8.6	2.7	7.6	5.6	2.6	5.6	1.4	45.5	34.0
Norrbotten	N	85.6	2.7	166,177	48.7	12.9	11.0	4.9	4.5	8.6	3.2	3.0	2.4	0.8	62.2	23.7
Skåne NE	G	84.6	3.2	196,700	30.0	22.1	22.2	5.5	6.0	3.1	4.5	4.1	1.7	0.8	38.5	36.8
Skåne S	G	87.9	3.8	239,845	24.6	28.2	16.6	7.3	5.3	3.6	7.0	3.5	2.9	1.0	35.4	44.1
Skåne W	G	83.5	2.9	182,009	30.3	24.5	19.3	6.1	4.6	3.8	5.2	3.2	1.9	1.0	40.2	37.5
Stockholm (city)	S	85.8	9.3	577,565	21.6	27.7	6.6	11.1	4.9	7.7	7.9	4.3	7.2	0.9	40.5	44.7
Stockholm County	S	85.5	12.3	764,195	24.0	32.7	9.7	7.8	5.1	4.7	7.0	5.3	2.7	1.0	36.5	50.1
Södermanland	S	86.0	2.9	178,632	34.6	22.4	15.1	6.3	5.5	5.1	4.4	3.9	2.1	0.8	46.0	36.1
Uppsala	S	87.4	3.7	228,351	28.9	22.8	10.5	8.4	6.9	6.3	6.2	4.7	4.1	1.2	43.5	40.6
Värmland	S	86.0	2.9	182,077	39.1	19.6	12.6	5.2	7.4	5.2	4.1	4.0	2.0	0.7	49.5	35.2
Västerbotten	N	86.9	2.8	175,279	42.0	13.8	7.4	5.9	6.7	11.0	4.4	4.3	3.8	0.8	58.9	29.0
Västernorrland	N	86.1	2.6	162,112	46.3	15.9	10.8	4.4	6.7	5.7	3.4	3.8	2.2	0.9	56.3	29.8
Västmanland	S	85.2	2.7	166,939	35.9	21.4	14.8	5.1	5.2	5.4	5.2	3.9	2.0	1.0	46.4	35.7
Västra Götaland E	G	87.2	2.8	174,445	34.6	21.0	14.8	5.0	8.2	4.5	4.2	5.1	1.7	0.8	44.1	38.5
Västra Götaland N	G	86.4	2.9	179,053	32.6	20.1	15.1	6.3	6.9	5.5	5.3	5.1	2.3	0.9	44.3	37.4
Västra Götaland S	G	85.7	2.0	124,892	31.1	22.3	15.0	6.0	7.5	5.2	4.9	5.1	2.0	0.8	42.3	39.8
Västra Götaland W	G	87.2	3.8	234,945	27.0	25.6	13.4	6.8	6.0	5.2	6.9	5.7	2.5	0.9	39.0	44.2
Örebro	S	86.7	3.0	188,704	36.9	18.6	14.4	6.4	5.6	5.4	4.3	5.2	2.4	0.9	48.6	33.6
Östergötland	G	87.0	4.7	291,484	32.6	22.3	14.4	6.6	6.0	4.8	5.1	5.1	2.2	1.0	44.0	38.4
Total		85.8	100.0	6,231,573	31.0	23.3	12.9	6.9	6.1	5.7	5.4	4.6	3.1	1.0	43.6	39.4
Source: val.se

=== By votes ===
Location	Land	Turnout	Share	Votes	S	M	SD	MP	C	V	FP	KD	F!	Other	Left	Right
Blekinge	G	86.8	1.6	102,225	37,981	19,824	18,960	4,969	5,792	4,746	3,984	3,483	1,701	785	47,696	33,083
Dalarna	S	86.2	3.0	184,911	65,543	35,087	31,043	9,352	14,371	10,672	6,350	6,427	4,176	1,890	85,567	62,235
Gothenburg	G	82.8	5.4	334,294	79,167	79,768	32,240	32,868	12,696	31,272	24,136	15,389	21,661	5,097	143,307	131,989
Gotland	G	86.5	0.6	39,655	12,774	8,450	3,259	2,859	5,317	2,308	1,494	1,095	1,764	335	17,941	16,356
Gävleborg	N	85.4	2.9	183,515	70,150	31,911	29,329	9,238	12,244	12,054	6,840	5,931	4,053	1,765	91,442	56,926
Halland	G	87.5	3.3	206,559	58,562	57,261	26,555	12,184	17,367	7,785	11,807	8,988	3,766	2,284	78,531	95,423
Jämtland	N	85.3	1.3	83,714	33,303	14,513	9,224	4,760	9,487	5,252	2,370	2,119	2,035	651	43,315	28,489
Jönköping	G	87.0	3.6	224,596	71,487	45,594	32,815	12,095	17,800	8,685	8,090	23,322	3,154	1,554	92,267	94,806
Kalmar	G	86.7	2.5	158,822	56,370	32,313	24,260	7,435	13,867	7,235	5,611	7,448	2,954	1,329	71,040	59,239
Kronoberg	G	86.7	1.9	120,775	39,179	26,453	18,820	6,559	10,988	5,459	4,109	5,983	2,227	998	51,197	47,533
Malmö	G	79.7	2.9	179,103	52,460	41,510	24,171	15,367	4,850	13,598	10,000	4,620	9,999	2,528	81,425	60,980
Norrbotten	N	85.6	2.7	166,177	80,984	21,438	18,237	8,111	7,513	14,225	5,369	5,048	3,944	1,308	103,320	39,368
Skåne NE	G	84.6	3.2	196,700	58,940	43,518	43,582	10,809	11,815	6,083	8,887	8,131	3,328	1,607	75,832	72,351
Skåne S	G	87.9	3.8	239,845	59,020	67,671	39,734	17,391	12,795	8,578	16,819	8,379	7,049	2,409	84,989	105,664
Skåne W	G	83.5	2.9	182,009	55,185	44,558	35,180	11,032	8,380	6,962	9,470	5,860	3,537	1,845	73,179	68,268
Stockholm (city)	S	85.8	9.3	577,565	124,792	160,166	38,356	64,392	28,201	44,656	45,365	24,691	41,488	5,458	233,840	258,423
Stockholm County	S	85.5	12.3	764,195	183,738	249,616	74,136	59,586	38,898	35,722	53,766	40,492	20,573	7,668	279,046	382,772
Södermanland	S	86.0	2.9	178,632	61,834	39,991	26,887	11,165	9,774	9,084	7,776	6,888	3,789	1,444	82,083	64,429
Uppsala	S	87.4	3.7	228,351	65,926	52,071	24,091	19,080	15,827	14,363	14,141	10,776	9,317	2,759	99,369	92,815
Värmland	S	86.0	2.9	182,077	71,173	35,687	22,978	9,398	13,521	9,517	7,531	7,263	3,697	1,312	90,088	64,002
Västerbotten	N	86.9	2.8	175,279	73,661	24,158	12,979	10,341	11,660	19,214	7,606	7,477	6,720	1,463	103,216	50,901
Västernorrland	N	86.1	2.6	162,112	74,977	25,833	17,569	7,073	10,922	9,211	5,440	6,097	3,575	1,415	91,261	48,292
Västmanland	S	85.2	2.7	166,939	59,936	35,697	24,728	8,549	8,719	9,051	8,756	6,496	3,398	1,609	77,536	59,668
Västra Götaland E	G	87.2	2.8	174,445	60,424	36,579	25,765	8,707	14,295	7,858	7,392	8,919	3,035	1,471	76,989	67,185
Västra Götaland N	G	86.4	2.9	179,053	58,289	35,979	27,027	11,219	12,335	9,895	9,472	9,099	4,205	1,533	79,403	66,885
Västra Götaland S	G	85.7	2.0	124,892	38,791	27,795	18,773	7,534	9,423	6,520	6,145	6,376	2,484	1,051	52,845	49,739
Västra Götaland W	G	87.2	3.8	234,945	63,552	60,129	31,401	15,971	14,091	12,132	16,134	13,486	5,978	2,071	91,655	103,840
Örebro	S	86.7	3.0	188,704	69,604	35,070	27,126	12,013	10,546	10,183	8,053	9,771	4,567	1,771	91,800	63,440
Östergötland	G	87.0	4.7	291,484	94,909	64,877	41,953	19,218	17,443	14,011	14,860	14,752	6,545	2,916	128,138	111,932
Total		85.8	100.0	6,231,573	1,932,711	1,453,517	801,178	429,275	380,937	356,331	337,773	284,806	194,719	60,326	2,718,317	2,457,033
Source: val.se

== Municipal summary ==
Location	County	Turnout	Votes	S	M	SD	MP	C	V	FP	KD	F!	Other	Left	Right
Ale	Västra Götaland	86.2	17,853	32.3	22.2	16.3	5.6	5.1	6.3	4.3	4.4	2.5	1.0	44.3	36.0
Alingsås	Västra Götaland	88.2	26,316	27.5	22.6	10.8	8.9	6.7	6.0	6.9	6.9	2.9	0.8	42.4	43.1
Alvesta	Kronoberg	86.5	12,114	31.0	20.5	21.6	3.5	10.6	4.1	2.4	4.2	1.3	0.8	38.6	37.7
Aneby	Jönköping	89.1	4,425	29.1	16.8	16.5	4.8	12.3	2.6	2.9	13.5	0.8	0.6	36.5	45.5
Arboga	Västmanland	85.2	8,975	38.3	20.6	15.5	5.2	5.5	5.0	3.9	3.5	1.7	0.8	48.5	33.6
Arjeplog	Norrbotten	80.3	1,851	44.2	9.8	14.7	3.5	6.9	12.0	3.3	3.5	1.7	0.5	59.6	23.4
Arvidsjaur	Norrbotten	85.0	4,326	52.1	10.1	13.1	1.6	6.2	10.2	3.1	1.8	1.2	0.6	63.9	21.2
Arvika	Värmland	84.6	16,818	39.4	17.6	13.8	5.1	7.9	6.1	3.5	3.7	2.4	0.6	50.5	32.7
Askersund	Örebro	86.7	7,664	37.9	17.4	17.7	4.1	8.5	4.4	3.1	4.4	1.6	1.0	46.5	33.3
Avesta	Dalarna	86.0	14,654	41.8	15.4	19.4	3.6	5.3	5.6	3.1	3.0	1.5	1.0	50.9	27.2
Bengtsfors	Västra Götaland	83.6	6,058	37.5	15.9	19.2	3.3	9.6	3.7	3.0	4.5	2.3	0.9	44.6	33.0
Berg	Jämtland	84.9	4,757	39.0	17.0	14.1	3.8	15.6	4.5	1.8	1.7	1.8	0.7	47.3	36.1
Bjurholm	Västerbotten	84.3	1,607	37.1	21.0	10.1	1.7	12.1	4.9	5.5	6.1	1.0	0.4	43.8	44.7
Bjuv	Skåne	81.0	8,470	40.4	16.8	25.7	3.7	3.2	3.5	2.6	2.2	1.0	0.9	47.6	24.8
Boden	Norrbotten	86.5	18,890	46.5	15.4	14.7	3.6	3.7	6.6	4.1	2.8	2.0	0.6	56.8	26.0
Bollebygd	Västra Götaland	89.6	5,802	27.0	24.6	18.5	5.2	7.9	4.3	4.7	5.1	1.8	0.8	36.6	42.3
Bollnäs	Gävleborg	83.9	17,170	38.9	15.2	18.6	4.2	8.4	5.9	3.1	3.2	2.0	0.6	48.9	29.9
Borgholm	Kalmar	87.0	7,587	25.6	24.6	15.3	4.5	14.7	3.7	3.5	5.1	2.3	0.8	33.7	47.8
Borlänge	Dalarna	86.2	31,740	37.3	18.0	17.7	5.6	5.1	6.2	3.7	3.2	2.3	1.1	49.0	30.0
Borås	Västra Götaland	84.9	67,295	31.4	23.3	14.4	6.8	4.9	5.8	5.2	5.1	2.2	0.8	44.0	38.6
Botkyrka	Stockholm	77.8	43,727	36.1	22.1	10.3	8.1	2.7	6.8	4.8	5.7	2.3	1.1	51.1	35.2
Boxholm	Östergötland	89.3	3,687	44.1	14.8	15.6	4.2	8.3	4.3	2.7	4.4	0.9	0.6	52.6	30.2
Bromölla	Skåne	85.8	8,029	37.9	15.3	28.4	4.2	3.0	4.5	3.0	2.1	1.0	0.5	46.6	23.4
Bräcke	Jämtland	83.9	4,226	47.4	13.0	12.6	2.8	11.6	6.2	2.0	1.3	1.3	1.7	56.4	28.1
Burlöv	Skåne	80.6	9,661	36.7	21.1	19.3	6.1	3.0	4.3	4.9	1.8	1.8	0.9	47.1	30.9
Båstad	Skåne	86.9	10,086	18.2	34.7	14.8	6.3	10.1	2.2	6.1	5.4	1.7	0.6	26.6	56.3
Dals-Ed	Västra Götaland	83.7	2,892	29.4	18.5	20.3	2.7	13.8	2.8	2.8	7.1	1.4	1.2	34.8	42.2
Danderyd	Stockholm	90.8	21,264	6.8	50.0	5.3	4.7	7.1	1.3	11.9	10.5	1.8	0.6	12.9	79.5
Degerfors	Örebro	86.4	6,426	51.2	10.6	14.4	4.0	4.2	8.1	1.9	3.4	1.5	0.7	63.3	20.1
Dorotea	Västerbotten	85.7	1,872	49.2	6.9	9.6	1.6	10.9	10.7	6.6	2.7	1.3	0.5	61.5	27.1
Eda	Värmland	79.7	4,344	41.8	17.7	15.2	2.0	11.2	5.0	2.4	3.2	1.0	0.6	48.7	34.4
Ekerö	Stockholm	90.7	17,013	16.1	38.9	9.3	8.3	7.1	3.2	7.3	6.3	2.9	0.7	27.5	59.6
Eksjö	Jönköping	87.0	11,143	30.9	20.5	13.3	5.4	11.2	3.4	4.2	8.6	1.6	0.9	39.7	44.6
Emmaboda	Kalmar	85.9	6,028	40.1	16.6	15.3	3.9	11.1	4.6	1.7	4.0	1.6	0.9	48.7	33.5
Enköping	Uppsala	86.0	26,698	30.2	26.5	13.5	5.5	8.9	3.7	5.0	4.0	1.7	1.0	39.4	44.4
Eskilstuna	Södermanland	84.0	61,217	35.5	21.4	16.6	6.1	4.3	5.4	4.4	3.6	2.0	0.9	46.9	33.6
Eslöv	Skåne	84.4	19,986	32.8	20.0	21.5	5.7	6.7	3.7	4.4	2.3	2.0	0.9	42.3	33.4
Essunga	Västra Götaland	86.8	3,692	30.7	24.2	16.0	4.1	11.4	3.8	2.8	4.3	1.9	0.7	38.7	42.8
Fagersta	Västmanland	83.5	7,809	45.0	15.5	18.6	4.2	2.5	6.5	2.7	2.6	1.6	0.9	55.7	23.3
Falkenberg	Halland	86.2	28,099	32.6	23.2	13.0	5.7	11.3	3.9	4.0	3.9	1.7	0.6	42.2	42.5
Falköping	Västra Götaland	87.2	21,103	32.3	19.9	17.5	4.9	9.2	4.2	3.4	6.1	1.8	0.7	41.5	38.5
Falun	Dalarna	87.4	38,251	30.2	23.2	12.8	7.2	8.0	5.9	4.5	3.8	3.3	1.0	43.3	39.5
Filipstad	Värmland	83.5	6,671	46.2	12.3	21.3	3.0	3.9	6.7	2.3	2.1	1.4	0.8	55.9	20.6
Finspång	Östergötland	86.4	13,971	43.2	16.1	15.4	4.6	5.1	5.3	3.3	4.5	1.8	0.8	53.0	29.0
Flen	Södermanland	85.4	10,136	36.2	18.9	17.8	4.9	7.5	5.4	3.4	3.5	1.6	0.9	46.6	33.1
Forshaga	Värmland	87.3	7,597	46.9	14.9	14.0	3.8	6.5	4.8	3.1	3.5	1.5	0.8	55.6	28.0
Färgelanda	Västra Götaland	85.8	4,248	34.3	13.0	24.0	2.6	13.8	3.4	3.2	3.7	1.2	0.8	40.3	33.8
Gagnef	Dalarna	88.1	6,771	32.7	18.1	17.3	4.3	11.6	5.1	3.1	4.2	2.6	0.9	42.2	37.0
Gislaved	Jönköping	85.1	18,152	35.4	21.9	15.9	3.7	10.1	3.1	3.2	5.4	0.8	0.6	42.1	40.5
Gnesta	Södermanland	87.2	6,880	30.2	23.4	13.2	7.7	8.7	5.9	3.3	2.9	3.6	1.0	43.8	38.3
Gnosjö	Jönköping	85.1	5,770	30.5	20.7	15.9	3.4	8.5	2.6	2.9	14.2	0.8	0.4	36.5	46.4
Gothenburg	Västra Götaland	82.8	334,294	23.7	23.9	9.6	9.8	3.8	9.4	7.2	4.6	6.5	1.5	42.9	39.5
Gotland	Gotland	86.5	39,655	32.2	21.3	8.2	7.2	13.4	5.8	3.8	2.8	4.4	0.8	45.2	41.2
Grums	Värmland	84.5	5,935	48.0	15.2	14.9	2.9	7.4	4.3	2.4	3.0	1.1	0.9	55.1	28.0
Grästorp	Västra Götaland	86.8	3,853	30.7	23.6	15.8	3.6	13.0	3.9	3.3	4.2	1.2	0.8	38.2	44.0
Gullspång	Västra Götaland	85.3	3,394	42.3	16.0	16.4	3.1	7.9	5.3	2.4	3.8	1.9	1.1	50.7	30.0
Gällivare	Norrbotten	82.2	12,108	50.5	10.8	15.2	4.2	1.8	11.6	1.4	2.3	1.6	0.6	66.3	16.3
Gävle	Gävleborg	86.8	64,299	34.1	21.0	15.8	6.2	4.3	6.7	5.1	3.2	2.6	1.0	47.0	33.6
Götene	Västra Götaland	88.4	8,825	36.0	18.9	12.9	4.8	9.4	5.2	3.8	6.2	2.1	0.8	45.9	38.3
Habo	Jönköping	91.6	7,254	27.7	22.7	15.4	5.4	6.5	3.2	3.7	13.4	1.1	0.9	36.3	46.3
Hagfors	Värmland	84.0	7,943	54.1	10.6	14.3	1.9	6.6	6.5	2.1	2.1	1.1	0.6	62.5	21.4
Hallsberg	Örebro	88.3	10,280	43.6	14.6	16.7	4.3	6.2	5.0	2.9	4.3	1.6	0.7	53.0	28.1
Hallstahammar	Västmanland	83.9	9,655	45.0	15.0	16.6	4.0	3.8	6.1	3.8	3.3	1.3	1.1	55.1	25.9
Halmstad	Halland	86.0	62,999	33.4	24.6	12.4	6.2	6.3	4.5	5.4	3.9	1.8	1.6	44.1	40.1
Hammarö	Värmland	90.0	10,274	37.7	25.8	8.3	6.1	5.1	4.6	5.3	4.8	1.8	0.6	48.4	40.9
Haninge	Stockholm	83.5	46,666	30.4	28.5	12.3	7.5	3.5	5.1	5.2	3.7	2.3	1.5	43.0	40.9
Haparanda	Norrbotten	70.4	4,323	50.3	13.3	13.5	2.9	8.4	4.8	1.8	2.7	1.6	0.7	58.1	26.1
Heby	Uppsala	85.0	8,824	35.5	16.4	16.5	3.6	13.1	4.6	2.7	4.8	1.8	1.0	43.7	37.0
Hedemora	Dalarna	84.6	9,923	35.0	17.7	17.5	4.5	9.3	6.1	2.8	3.1	2.5	1.6	45.6	32.9
Helsingborg	Skåne	82.7	83,482	29.5	27.3	17.4	6.7	3.4	4.1	5.3	3.4	1.9	0.9	40.4	39.4
Herrljunga	Västra Götaland	87.6	6,259	28.4	18.9	17.4	4.3	12.7	4.3	4.2	7.0	1.7	1.0	37.0	42.9
Hjo	Västra Götaland	88.2	6,093	30.8	23.0	14.5	5.5	7.8	4.6	5.1	6.4	1.8	0.6	40.9	42.3
Hofors	Gävleborg	84.1	6,100	47.4	11.2	16.0	3.0	4.5	10.8	2.8	1.7	1.6	1.0	61.2	20.2
Huddinge	Stockholm	83.5	57,254	26.9	30.5	10.4	8.5	4.2	5.4	6.0	4.1	3.0	1.0	40.7	44.8
Hudiksvall	Gävleborg	84.5	24,350	38.4	16.2	13.8	6.0	9.2	7.0	2.8	3.3	2.5	0.9	51.4	31.5
Hultsfred	Kalmar	84.1	8,767	39.6	14.3	17.6	2.7	10.9	4.1	2.1	6.6	1.1	1.0	46.4	33.9
Hylte	Halland	84.3	6,123	36.6	17.3	18.5	2.9	12.1	2.9	4.2	3.3	1.1	1.1	42.4	36.9
Håbo	Uppsala	87.6	12,616	25.7	33.8	14.9	5.6	4.9	3.4	4.9	4.3	1.6	1.1	34.7	47.8
Hällefors	Örebro	82.5	4,398	47.2	12.9	18.0	3.1	4.7	6.6	2.2	2.1	1.9	1.3	57.0	21.8
Härjedalen	Jämtland	82.8	6,765	42.9	17.1	15.2	3.0	10.5	5.2	2.1	1.9	1.5	0.7	51.0	31.6
Härnösand	Västernorrland	85.4	16,338	43.2	15.5	11.0	7.0	6.5	6.4	3.3	3.3	3.0	0.8	56.6	28.6
Härryda	Västra Götaland	89.3	23,152	22.6	29.5	12.6	8.0	6.2	4.6	8.2	4.9	2.6	0.9	35.1	48.8
Hässleholm	Skåne	85.1	32,633	29.9	19.0	23.5	6.9	6.1	3.1	3.8	5.1	1.8	0.8	39.9	34.1
Höganäs	Skåne	87.7	16,846	22.0	33.9	14.8	6.3	5.3	3.0	6.4	5.4	2.1	0.9	31.3	50.9
Högsby	Kalmar	85.7	3,628	39.3	14.7	19.9	2.3	10.6	4.1	1.9	5.3	1.1	0.7	45.7	32.6
Hörby	Skåne	84.0	9,503	24.9	19.4	27.4	4.8	9.0	2.7	4.0	3.7	1.9	2.1	32.5	36.1
Höör	Skåne	86.5	10,108	25.5	22.4	21.0	7.8	7.0	4.2	4.8	3.8	2.4	1.2	37.5	37.9
Jokkmokk	Norrbotten	81.7	3,296	48.5	9.1	12.8	9.5	2.4	9.7	3.2	1.3	2.9	0.7	67.6	16.0
Järfälla	Stockholm	85.5	42,200	28.6	29.0	10.2	7.7	4.0	5.9	6.1	5.0	2.4	1.1	42.2	44.1
Jönköping	Jönköping	87.1	86,829	30.5	21.9	12.5	6.8	5.8	4.6	4.2	11.1	1.9	0.7	41.9	43.0
Kalix	Norrbotten	85.3	10,979	55.7	11.5	11.5	4.1	4.7	6.3	2.4	2.1	1.3	0.3	66.1	18.7
Kalmar	Kalmar	87.6	43,711	32.7	23.5	13.1	6.9	6.8	4.5	4.5	4.4	2.7	0.9	44.2	39.1
Karlsborg	Västra Götaland	88.6	4,821	35.0	17.2	17.7	3.6	9.7	3.2	6.0	5.8	1.3	0.5	41.8	38.7
Karlshamn	Blekinge	85.9	20,992	38.7	18.9	18.4	5.7	4.8	5.0	2.9	3.1	2.0	0.7	49.3	29.5
Karlskoga	Örebro	85.7	19,877	44.7	18.7	14.4	4.8	3.4	5.0	3.3	3.6	1.3	0.9	54.4	29.0
Karlskrona	Blekinge	87.9	42,727	36.3	20.7	15.5	5.4	5.8	4.6	5.2	3.9	1.8	0.8	46.3	35.7
Karlstad	Värmland	87.7	61,111	34.7	23.3	9.6	7.7	5.7	5.5	5.3	4.5	3.0	0.8	47.9	38.8
Katrineholm	Södermanland	86.0	21,351	39.5	19.0	14.3	6.0	6.4	4.7	4.2	3.5	1.8	0.6	50.2	33.1
Kil	Värmland	87.4	7,982	38.8	18.7	14.6	4.5	8.5	5.2	3.3	4.2	1.5	0.7	48.5	34.7
Kinda	Östergötland	88.0	6,682	31.7	19.2	16.7	5.0	10.4	4.6	3.2	6.3	1.8	1.2	41.2	39.1
Kiruna	Norrbotten	84.3	14,964	47.4	10.3	13.2	5.2	2.9	11.6	2.3	3.4	2.8	0.9	64.2	18.9
Klippan	Skåne	81.9	10,077	33.7	19.1	25.6	3.8	5.3	3.4	2.8	4.1	1.3	0.9	40.9	31.2
Knivsta	Uppsala	89.0	9,716	21.7	30.6	10.8	8.0	8.0	3.9	6.5	6.7	2.6	1.1	33.6	51.8
Kramfors	Västernorrland	85.1	12,448	51.8	11.3	9.7	3.3	9.5	7.5	1.7	2.4	2.2	0.6	62.6	24.9
Kristianstad	Skåne	84.6	51,872	29.8	22.5	21.5	5.9	5.2	3.1	6.4	3.3	1.6	0.8	38.8	37.3
Kristinehamn	Värmland	86.1	16,173	41.2	19.3	11.4	5.1	6.3	5.6	4.8	3.8	1.7	0.8	51.9	34.2
Krokom	Jämtland	85.7	9,253	37.0	17.6	10.7	4.7	15.6	6.6	2.3	2.8	2.0	0.7	48.3	38.4
Kumla	Örebro	87.7	13,529	38.2	18.0	16.2	5.0	5.1	4.3	5.0	5.8	1.7	0.8	47.4	33.8
Kungsbacka	Halland	90.3	52,386	17.1	38.0	12.0	6.0	7.6	2.9	8.1	5.5	2.0	0.8	26.0	59.2
Kungsör	Västmanland	86.2	5,332	36.3	18.7	17.5	3.6	7.2	5.0	4.9	4.4	1.6	0.8	45.0	35.2
Kungälv	Västra Götaland	89.1	28,818	26.9	26.1	13.6	6.4	6.6	4.9	6.6	5.7	2.2	0.9	38.2	45.1
Kävlinge	Skåne	89.7	19,329	27.1	29.4	18.9	5.8	5.6	2.0	6.4	2.8	1.2	0.7	35.0	44.2
Köping	Västmanland	83.9	15,938	40.7	17.4	17.4	4.0	6.0	5.6	3.7	3.1	1.3	0.7	50.2	30.3
Laholm	Halland	86.0	15,661	27.0	24.8	18.3	5.1	11.3	3.0	3.9	3.9	1.5	1.3	35.1	43.8
Landskrona	Skåne	81.9	25,354	37.3	19.9	18.8	5.0	2.8	4.2	7.0	2.0	1.9	1.0	46.5	31.7
Laxå	Örebro	85.9	3,760	43.9	13.8	18.1	3.2	5.6	5.5	2.9	5.4	0.9	0.8	52.6	27.7
Lekeberg	Örebro	88.4	4,939	30.0	16.9	18.2	4.3	13.4	4.3	3.1	6.8	1.9	1.2	38.5	40.2
Leksand	Dalarna	87.5	10,584	29.4	23.7	11.8	5.8	10.0	4.9	3.8	7.4	2.5	0.7	40.1	44.9
Lerum	Västra Götaland	89.7	25,953	23.6	27.4	12.0	8.5	6.0	5.0	7.9	5.6	3.2	0.9	37.1	46.9
Lessebo	Kronoberg	87.3	5,014	41.5	16.3	18.0	4.6	6.8	5.8	2.1	2.4	1.9	0.7	51.9	27.6
Lidingö	Stockholm	88.9	29,568	11.0	44.7	6.4	6.4	7.0	2.0	11.6	7.9	2.5	0.4	19.4	71.2
Lidköping	Västra Götaland	88.2	26,698	36.1	19.8	12.5	5.8	7.0	5.6	5.1	5.4	1.8	0.9	47.6	37.2
Lilla Edet	Västra Götaland	83.0	8,076	35.3	15.4	22.7	4.2	6.3	6.4	3.5	3.0	2.1	1.0	45.9	28.2
Lindesberg	Örebro	86.8	15,348	36.9	16.9	20.9	4.7	7.5	4.3	2.8	3.7	1.5	0.9	45.9	30.8
Linköping	Östergötland	88.0	100,372	29.1	24.2	11.2	8.2	6.1	4.7	7.0	5.8	2.6	1.2	42.0	43.1
Ljungby	Kronoberg	85.2	17,712	33.4	20.3	16.4	4.2	10.2	4.2	3.1	5.8	1.3	1.1	41.8	39.4
Ljusdal	Gävleborg	83.0	12,119	36.5	18.8	16.6	4.9	8.6	5.6	3.2	2.5	2.6	0.9	46.9	32.9
Ljusnarsberg	Örebro	83.7	3,130	42.0	12.3	23.7	3.3	5.1	6.6	2.3	2.2	1.4	1.1	51.9	21.9
Lomma	Skåne	92.9	15,473	17.4	39.9	12.6	5.8	5.8	1.3	9.9	5.0	1.6	0.6	24.5	60.6
Ludvika	Dalarna	85.5	16,841	40.6	15.4	20.0	4.6	4.1	7.6	3.1	2.4	1.7	0.5	52.9	25.0
Luleå	Norrbotten	87.6	51,682	44.7	15.9	8.8	6.6	4.6	7.5	4.4	3.2	3.0	1.2	58.8	28.2
Lund	Skåne	88.6	75,844	22.6	22.7	9.2	12.3	5.7	6.4	9.8	4.0	6.0	1.3	36.1	42.1
Lycksele	Västerbotten	83.5	7,971	46.0	14.1	10.5	2.3	4.1	10.3	3.7	7.2	1.3	0.4	58.6	29.2
Lysekil	Västra Götaland	85.2	9,746	35.4	18.0	15.9	5.8	5.3	6.1	6.2	4.2	2.5	0.6	47.3	33.7
Malmö	Skåne	79.7	179,103	29.3	23.2	13.5	8.6	2.7	7.6	5.6	2.6	5.6	1.4	45.5	34.0
Malung-Sälen	Dalarna	85.3	6,674	36.2	22.6	17.3	2.7	8.6	4.7	3.7	2.4	0.9	1.0	43.6	37.2
Malå	Västerbotten	83.3	2,050	50.8	8.6	10.6	2.3	4.7	13.0	4.6	3.0	1.5	0.9	66.0	20.9
Mariestad	Västra Götaland	85.9	16,065	37.1	21.9	13.6	5.1	6.4	5.2	3.6	4.6	1.7	0.7	47.5	36.6
Mark	Västra Götaland	86.4	22,161	33.2	18.9	14.8	5.4	8.9	5.6	5.2	5.2	2.0	0.9	44.2	38.2
Markaryd	Kronoberg	83.9	5,939	34.5	19.6	21.1	3.5	7.5	2.4	1.7	7.4	0.9	1.4	40.4	36.2
Mellerud	Västra Götaland	83.0	5,709	30.6	18.4	21.1	3.3	12.6	3.7	3.3	4.8	1.5	0.6	37.6	39.1
Mjölby	Östergötland	87.0	17,732	37.7	21.0	14.9	4.3	6.4	4.3	4.3	4.8	1.5	0.8	46.4	36.4
Mora	Dalarna	84.5	13,457	35.5	19.5	16.9	4.6	9.9	4.5	2.9	3.1	1.7	1.3	44.6	35.4
Motala	Östergötland	87.0	28,327	39.8	18.7	16.2	4.9	5.0	4.8	4.4	3.8	1.4	1.0	49.5	31.9
Mullsjö	Jönköping	89.2	4,752	28.6	16.7	16.0	6.0	5.1	4.8	3.4	17.0	1.4	1.0	39.4	42.2
Munkedal	Västra Götaland	83.6	6,564	31.8	19.5	19.2	3.2	9.8	5.5	3.2	5.0	1.8	1.0	40.5	37.5
Munkfors	Värmland	85.1	2,463	58.1	9.7	11.4	2.1	4.6	6.2	3.5	2.0	2.1	0.4	64.8	21.4
Mölndal	Västra Götaland	87.5	40,637	25.3	25.5	11.6	9.1	5.1	5.8	8.4	5.3	3.1	1.0	40.1	44.3
Mönsterås	Kalmar	87.5	8,830	39.1	16.9	18.3	3.1	9.6	4.5	2.4	4.3	1.2	0.7	46.6	33.2
Mörbylånga	Kalmar	90.3	10,127	29.3	24.8	15.2	5.5	9.7	3.8	4.1	4.5	2.6	0.5	38.6	43.1
Nacka	Stockholm	88.7	59,114	17.7	37.1	6.5	9.6	6.3	4.3	8.5	5.2	3.9	0.8	31.5	57.2
Nora	Örebro	85.9	6,924	39.5	16.3	15.4	5.1	7.5	5.4	3.5	3.9	2.1	1.2	50.0	31.2
Norberg	Västmanland	86.0	3,766	38.4	14.2	20.3	4.3	4.3	8.9	2.8	2.3	2.8	1.7	51.6	23.6
Nordanstig	Gävleborg	84.8	6,204	38.7	14.6	18.2	3.7	9.4	5.8	3.4	3.7	1.8	0.9	48.1	31.1
Nordmaling	Västerbotten	84.0	4,644	43.0	13.6	9.3	2.3	11.3	9.2	5.1	4.6	1.2	0.3	54.4	34.7
Norrköping	Östergötland	85.3	86,258	30.9	23.2	16.3	6.9	4.5	5.5	4.5	4.6	2.7	1.0	43.3	36.8
Norrtälje	Stockholm	85.4	38,444	29.9	27.9	12.4	6.3	7.4	4.5	4.6	3.6	2.3	1.1	40.6	43.5
Norsjö	Västerbotten	83.0	2,634	50.2	8.6	9.7	1.3	8.3	12.3	3.6	4.9	0.6	0.5	63.7	25.5
Nybro	Kalmar	85.6	13,001	36.8	17.2	17.2	3.4	10.5	5.3	2.6	4.6	1.3	1.2	45.5	34.9
Nykvarn	Stockholm	89.4	6,106	26.3	31.5	18.0	5.6	5.8	2.5	4.5	3.8	1.2	0.8	34.3	45.6
Nyköping	Södermanland	87.4	35,684	34.0	23.0	12.5	7.5	6.0	4.8	4.5	4.4	2.5	0.7	46.3	37.9
Nynäshamn	Stockholm	85.1	16,995	30.6	26.4	14.7	6.4	4.3	5.1	5.3	3.8	2.3	1.1	42.0	39.9
Nässjö	Jönköping	87.1	19,218	33.8	16.7	19.3	5.1	7.0	4.1	2.8	9.2	1.2	0.7	43.1	35.7
Ockelbo	Gävleborg	85.2	3,881	38.4	12.9	20.7	3.7	11.3	5.9	2.1	2.2	2.0	0.7	47.9	28.6
Olofström	Blekinge	83.8	8,372	45.9	13.4	19.1	3.5	5.6	4.9	2.0	3.4	1.2	0.9	54.3	24.5
Orsa	Dalarna	84.8	4,607	33.1	14.5	20.8	5.0	10.7	5.7	2.8	3.2	2.9	1.5	43.7	31.1
Orust	Västra Götaland	87.1	10,559	27.4	24.4	15.2	5.4	8.6	5.3	5.9	4.5	2.6	0.7	38.1	43.5
Osby	Skåne	85.5	8,244	35.2	16.1	25.4	4.2	5.9	3.4	2.7	4.9	1.2	0.9	42.9	29.6
Oskarshamn	Kalmar	86.6	17,615	37.8	21.0	16.3	3.3	4.6	4.9	4.4	5.8	1.3	0.7	46.0	35.8
Ovanåker	Gävleborg	85.1	7,684	36.5	14.4	16.0	3.5	13.4	3.8	2.2	8.2	1.1	0.9	43.8	38.2
Oxelösund	Södermanland	86.0	7,597	44.1	17.1	14.0	5.2	2.7	8.0	3.4	2.8	1.9	0.8	57.3	26.0
Pajala	Norrbotten	80.9	4,024	46.2	9.5	11.4	2.3	3.3	17.9	1.6	5.3	2.0	0.6	66.4	19.7
Partille	Västra Götaland	86.8	23,242	24.9	27.3	11.6	8.0	4.5	6.1	8.0	5.4	3.0	1.2	39.0	45.2
Perstorp	Skåne	80.8	4,171	37.1	17.4	25.3	4.2	4.9	3.3	3.1	2.8	1.0	1.0	44.6	28.1
Piteå	Norrbotten	88.8	29,203	53.6	11.6	7.6	4.6	5.0	8.0	2.9	3.5	2.7	0.5	66.2	22.4
Ragunda	Jämtland	83.5	3,551	48.4	9.4	13.8	2.7	12.8	7.2	1.2	1.6	1.8	1.0	58.3	25.0
Robertsfors	Västerbotten	85.8	4,507	42.3	11.1	6.8	3.4	16.8	8.9	2.9	4.6	2.2	0.9	54.7	35.4
Ronneby	Blekinge	86.8	18,695	36.0	17.8	21.5	3.9	6.9	5.2	3.5	2.9	1.5	0.8	45.1	31.1
Rättvik	Dalarna	84.6	7,458	31.7	21.4	17.0	4.8	10.2	4.5	3.6	3.4	1.9	1.5	41.0	38.6
Sala	Västmanland	86.2	14,529	33.5	19.9	15.4	4.7	11.0	4.6	4.0	3.6	2.2	1.1	42.8	38.5
Salem	Stockholm	87.8	9,728	24.9	30.7	11.4	7.8	5.3	4.2	6.9	5.6	2.4	0.8	36.9	48.5
Sandviken	Gävleborg	86.1	24,741	43.7	15.5	15.3	3.9	5.1	7.1	3.7	2.7	1.8	1.0	54.7	27.1
Sigtuna	Stockholm	82.5	24,526	28.3	30.2	12.8	6.5	4.3	4.6	5.0	5.2	2.0	1.0	39.4	44.7
Simrishamn	Skåne	84.8	13,094	26.1	25.1	19.2	5.8	7.6	3.6	4.5	3.6	3.9	0.6	35.5	40.8
Sjöbo	Skåne	84.2	11,830	23.7	23.2	30.0	3.9	7.7	2.3	2.8	3.4	2.0	1.0	29.9	37.2
Skara	Västra Götaland	87.1	12,332	34.5	21.4	16.0	5.4	7.7	4.4	3.6	4.2	2.0	0.9	44.2	37.0
Skinnskatteberg	Västmanland	84.9	2,909	42.8	13.3	18.2	3.0	6.4	6.4	5.1	2.4	1.7	0.7	52.1	27.3
Skellefteå	Västerbotten	86.7	48,779	50.2	10.7	7.8	5.3	5.8	9.3	3.8	4.0	2.4	0.8	64.8	24.3
Skurup	Skåne	85.7	9,556	28.6	23.6	25.1	3.9	6.7	3.3	3.8	2.3	1.7	0.9	35.9	36.5
Skövde	Västra Götaland	87.1	35,405	32.8	23.7	12.7	5.7	7.4	4.0	5.5	4.9	2.0	1.2	42.5	41.6
Smedjebacken	Dalarna	87.4	7,391	44.1	15.0	18.5	3.6	5.4	6.7	1.9	2.1	1.9	0.8	54.4	24.4
Sollefteå	Västernorrland	85.3	13,108	53.7	10.5	12.8	3.1	6.5	6.6	2.1	2.0	1.8	0.9	63.4	21.1
Sollentuna	Stockholm	87.7	41,878	20.2	36.1	7.1	8.2	5.6	4.2	8.8	6.4	2.5	0.9	32.6	56.9
Solna	Stockholm	85.9	46,764	22.5	29.9	7.7	10.0	4.9	6.7	8.1	4.4	4.7	1.0	39.2	47.4
Sorsele	Västerbotten	79.5	1,548	39.5	11.3	13.2	3.0	9.6	13.5	1.7	5.9	1.8	0.4	56.1	28.6
Sotenäs	Västra Götaland	86.4	6,350	29.1	31.4	12.4	3.7	5.2	3.9	6.6	5.4	1.7	0.4	36.7	48.7
Staffanstorp	Skåne	89.7	14,766	25.4	31.1	17.3	5.9	5.4	2.4	6.3	3.4	1.7	1.1	33.7	46.1
Stenungsund	Västra Götaland	88.0	16,555	27.6	28.5	13.7	6.4	5.9	4.2	6.5	4.4	2.0	0.8	38.2	45.3
Stockholm	Stockholm	85.8	577,565	21.6	27.7	6.6	11.1	4.9	7.7	7.9	4.3	7.2	0.9	40.5	44.7
Storfors	Värmland	86.4	2,627	49.0	12.2	17.5	2.2	6.5	6.2	1.8	3.6	0.6	0.5	57.4	24.1
Storuman	Västerbotten	81.3	3,881	40.4	13.1	11.6	3.0	9.4	10.2	4.0	6.5	1.2	0.5	53.6	33.1
Strängnäs	Södermanland	87.2	21,889	27.5	28.8	14.7	5.9	5.5	4.6	5.4	4.9	2.0	0.7	37.9	44.6
Strömstad	Västra Götaland	81.4	6,956	27.0	23.0	13.5	7.6	9.5	4.6	7.3	4.1	2.6	0.7	39.2	44.0
Strömsund	Jämtland	83.9	7,755	49.7	11.5	14.1	2.2	10.2	7.2	1.1	2.1	1.3	0.7	59.1	24.8
Sundbyberg	Stockholm	84.1	25,866	27.7	27.1	9.2	10.1	4.2	7.1	6.2	3.6	3.8	1.2	44.9	41.0
Sundsvall	Västernorrland	86.4	64,556	41.2	19.7	11.7	5.1	5.3	5.6	4.5	3.4	2.6	0.9	52.0	32.8
Sunne	Värmland	86.1	8,866	34.9	21.5	12.6	3.6	13.7	3.7	4.0	3.5	1.8	0.7	42.2	42.7
Surahammar	Västmanland	84.5	6,245	45.4	13.6	18.4	3.4	3.7	7.2	3.4	2.3	1.5	1.1	56.0	23.0
Svalöv	Skåne	85.2	8,260	29.3	17.8	26.4	4.7	9.7	3.1	3.5	2.6	2.2	0.9	37.1	33.5
Svedala	Skåne	88.9	12,922	26.6	26.9	24.1	5.1	4.4	2.1	5.4	2.9	1.5	1.1	33.8	39.5
Svenljunga	Västra Götaland	84.7	6,619	30.2	21.3	19.0	3.5	11.4	3.2	4.0	4.2	1.4	1.8	37.0	40.9
Säffle	Värmland	85.2	10,109	33.2	19.1	17.9	3.3	13.6	3.5	3.4	4.2	1.2	0.6	40.1	40.3
Säter	Dalarna	87.3	7,405	33.6	18.6	18.8	3.8	10.4	5.4	2.9	3.2	2.3	0.9	42.8	35.2
Sävsjö	Jönköping	86.8	6,993	27.4	17.8	18.7	2.6	11.5	2.7	2.3	15.3	0.8	0.8	32.8	48.9
Söderhamn	Gävleborg	84.6	16,967	43.6	15.0	15.8	4.1	6.9	6.2	2.6	2.8	1.7	1.2	53.9	27.3
Söderköping	Östergötland	88.3	9,826	27.0	26.0	16.5	5.8	8.7	3.8	4.3	5.0	1.9	1.0	36.6	44.1
Södertälje	Stockholm	77.9	47,151	32.0	23.1	12.3	7.3	3.8	5.8	4.6	6.9	2.7	1.4	45.1	38.4
Sölvesborg	Blekinge	87.0	11,439	33.0	22.7	25.0	3.9	4.6	3.2	2.8	3.0	1.3	0.7	40.0	33.0
Tanum	Västra Götaland	85.6	8,285	23.5	27.9	11.8	5.2	13.4	4.0	6.7	3.8	3.2	0.8	32.6	51.7
Tibro	Västra Götaland	87.7	7,235	37.1	16.9	16.8	4.4	7.3	3.6	4.7	7.0	1.5	0.6	45.1	36.0
Tidaholm	Västra Götaland	87.6	8,603	43.8	15.2	16.7	4.4	6.3	4.6	2.9	4.2	1.2	0.7	52.8	28.6
Tierp	Uppsala	85.6	13,308	42.6	15.1	14.3	4.2	9.7	5.1	2.9	2.9	1.9	1.3	51.9	30.6
Timrå	Västernorrland	86.1	11,804	50.3	13.0	13.9	3.0	4.8	6.7	3.5	2.6	1.6	0.7	60.0	23.9
Tingsryd	Kronoberg	84.9	7,952	31.2	20.3	20.4	2.8	13.1	3.6	2.2	4.4	1.3	0.6	37.6	40.0
Tjörn	Västra Götaland	88.7	10,673	22.1	28.9	14.2	5.5	5.5	3.5	7.5	10.1	2.1	0.7	31.1	52.0
Tomelilla	Skåne	84.4	8,326	28.6	20.4	25.5	4.2	9.6	2.6	3.0	2.3	2.4	1.2	35.5	35.4
Torsby	Värmland	81.3	7,599	43.5	17.3	14.4	2.7	8.9	5.8	2.5	2.8	1.3	0.8	52.0	31.6
Torsås	Kalmar	87.1	4,727	33.5	16.1	20.8	3.2	13.7	3.2	3.4	4.1	1.3	0.8	39.9	37.3
Tranemo	Västra Götaland	86.7	7,554	33.3	20.4	15.4	4.5	13.2	3.2	3.5	4.1	1.6	0.8	41.0	41.2
Tranås	Jönköping	87.4	12,308	36.1	18.9	15.5	5.5	6.4	4.0	3.7	7.7	1.6	0.6	45.6	36.8
Trelleborg	Skåne	84.6	27,191	32.8	23.9	23.8	4.3	4.0	2.5	3.9	2.5	1.4	1.0	39.5	34.2
Trollhättan	Västra Götaland	85.1	35,703	40.6	17.9	13.5	6.1	4.1	5.8	5.3	3.7	2.3	0.8	52.5	30.9
Trosa	Södermanland	89.4	7,983	26.6	32.3	12.2	6.6	6.4	3.5	5.1	4.3	2.2	0.8	36.7	48.1
Tyresö	Stockholm	88.7	28,236	24.0	34.5	9.6	8.4	4.6	4.3	6.5	4.6	2.6	1.0	36.7	50.1
Täby	Stockholm	89.8	43,791	12.5	45.3	6.4	6.1	6.4	2.2	11.3	7.0	1.9	0.8	20.9	70.0
Töreboda	Västra Götaland	85.0	5,944	35.6	18.4	17.3	3.7	12.1	4.1	2.6	3.9	1.4	0.8	43.4	37.1
Uddevalla	Västra Götaland	85.7	34,683	33.8	20.5	15.4	6.0	4.8	6.0	4.8	5.3	2.4	0.9	45.8	35.4
Ulricehamn	Västra Götaland	87.1	15,461	27.3	22.9	14.8	5.7	12.5	4.5	4.4	5.7	1.5	0.6	37.6	45.5
Umeå	Västerbotten	88.7	80,308	36.2	16.5	5.7	8.1	5.5	12.3	4.9	3.8	6.0	0.9	56.6	30.8
Upplands-Bro	Stockholm	85.6	14,874	29.6	27.3	12.3	6.4	4.0	4.9	6.7	5.7	1.9	1.3	40.9	43.7
Upplands Väsby	Stockholm	84.1	24,527	30.3	28.4	10.9	6.8	3.7	5.8	6.1	4.5	2.1	1.3	43.0	42.7
Uppsala	Uppsala	88.2	136,810	25.9	22.3	8.1	10.6	5.9	7.7	7.4	5.2	5.6	1.3	44.1	40.9
Uppvidinge	Kronoberg	85.7	5,707	33.4	17.7	20.0	2.9	13.2	4.2	2.7	3.7	1.3	0.8	40.5	37.3
Vadstena	Östergötland	88.1	5,277	33.2	25.2	12.5	6.2	6.8	3.8	3.8	5.8	2.2	0.6	43.1	41.5
Vaggeryd	Jönköping	87.0	8,525	34.3	17.8	15.5	4.1	8.0	3.5	3.1	11.9	1.0	0.9	41.8	40.8
Valdemarsvik	Östergötland	87.1	5,378	35.3	20.0	18.5	3.3	10.5	3.7	2.8	3.5	1.2	1.1	42.3	36.8
Vallentuna	Stockholm	89.3	20,051	19.6	36.3	10.3	8.3	6.8	3.2	7.0	4.9	2.3	1.2	31.1	55.1
Vansbro	Dalarna	84.4	4,441	36.5	14.4	16.2	2.7	14.2	5.7	2.2	5.9	0.8	1.3	45.0	36.7
Vara	Västra Götaland	86.0	10,382	29.6	25.7	17.1	3.4	11.0	4.0	3.3	4.1	1.1	0.7	37.0	44.1
Varberg	Halland	88.5	41,291	31.4	25.2	11.6	6.1	9.1	4.2	5.2	4.2	2.0	1.0	41.6	43.8
Vaxholm	Stockholm	90.6	7,384	15.2	41.1	6.7	8.5	7.9	3.2	8.7	5.5	2.6	0.7	26.8	63.2
Vellinge	Skåne	91.4	23,522	12.0	48.6	16.5	3.6	4.3	1.0	7.9	4.6	1.1	0.5	16.6	65.4
Vetlanda	Jönköping	86.4	17,403	32.1	18.3	16.4	4.1	11.0	3.5	3.5	9.3	1.1	0.7	39.6	42.1
Vilhelmina	Västerbotten	84.4	4,428	45.9	9.0	12.7	2.5	8.0	11.0	2.6	5.5	1.9	0.8	59.4	25.2
Vimmerby	Kalmar	86.6	10,314	36.3	18.9	15.5	3.9	11.6	4.4	2.3	5.0	1.4	0.9	44.5	37.8
Vindeln	Västerbotten	85.0	3,563	39.9	15.3	9.7	3.0	11.0	7.9	3.7	6.0	1.9	1.6	50.8	36.0
Vingåker	Södermanland	88.4	5,895	39.0	16.6	20.5	4.6	6.4	4.0	2.6	3.5	1.8	0.8	47.7	29.2
Vårgårda	Västra Götaland	88.8	7,366	28.0	18.0	15.7	5.2	11.9	4.3	4.3	10.4	1.4	0.8	37.4	44.7
Vänersborg	Västra Götaland	86.4	24,725	34.7	17.8	15.9	6.2	6.5	6.7	4.8	4.5	2.0	0.9	47.6	33.6
Vännäs	Västerbotten	85.9	5,594	39.8	12.8	8.5	4.3	10.6	12.3	3.4	4.7	2.6	1.0	56.4	31.5
Värmdö	Stockholm	89.3	25,255	20.3	37.4	10.4	8.3	5.4	3.7	6.2	4.3	3.1	0.8	32.4	53.3
Värnamo	Jönköping	86.8	21,824	33.8	20.4	13.4	4.1	10.9	3.0	3.0	9.8	1.0	0.6	40.9	44.0
Västervik	Kalmar	85.4	24,487	39.3	19.3	13.6	4.5	7.9	5.1	3.8	3.9	1.8	0.9	48.9	34.8
Västerås	Västmanland	85.5	91,781	32.5	24.8	12.9	5.9	4.5	5.1	6.5	4.5	2.3	1.0	43.5	40.2
Växjö	Kronoberg	87.9	56,319	31.3	24.0	12.2	7.2	7.6	5.2	4.3	5.0	2.4	0.7	43.7	40.9
Ydre	Östergötland	90.2	2,566	29.1	17.7	14.3	4.3	16.4	3.2	3.4	9.7	1.4	0.5	36.6	47.2
Ystad	Skåne	85.7	19,751	30.1	28.1	16.8	5.3	6.2	2.9	4.7	3.0	2.0	0.9	38.2	42.0
Åmål	Västra Götaland	83.0	7,895	39.1	16.6	17.0	5.0	7.2	5.1	3.9	3.6	1.9	0.6	49.2	31.3
Ånge	Västernorrland	84.6	6,464	49.7	11.4	16.2	1.9	7.5	5.8	1.5	2.7	1.5	1.9	57.4	23.0
Åre	Jämtland	86.1	6,806	31.6	21.6	9.4	8.8	13.7	4.9	3.1	4.0	2.4	0.6	45.3	42.3
Årjäng	Värmland	83.2	5,565	29.5	19.0	18.3	2.4	12.5	3.2	5.6	8.0	0.8	0.7	35.1	45.1
Åsele	Västerbotten	84.9	1,893	44.8	11.7	10.9	1.9	10.6	9.1	5.2	3.4	1.6	0.8	55.8	30.9
Åstorp	Skåne	80.1	8,360	38.7	17.8	24.1	3.9	4.0	3.1	3.1	3.2	1.1	1.0	45.7	28.1
Åtvidaberg	Östergötland	87.8	7,872	39.7	18.4	17.2	4.5	7.9	3.9	2.8	3.8	1.2	0.6	48.1	32.9
Älmhult	Kronoberg	86.2	10,018	33.5	22.5	15.0	5.2	10.0	3.4	3.1	5.1	1.4	0.8	42.1	40.7
Älvdalen	Dalarna	85.6	4,714	41.5	13.5	21.8	2.3	9.6	4.5	2.3	2.2	1.2	1.1	48.3	27.7
Älvkarleby	Uppsala	86.7	6,036	47.1	12.8	19.8	3.8	3.1	6.2	2.8	2.2	1.4	0.7	57.1	20.9
Älvsbyn	Norrbotten	84.9	5,416	53.5	8.1	12.8	2.2	6.1	9.2	2.7	3.2	1.5	0.8	64.8	20.1
Ängelholm	Skåne	85.7	26,882	26.5	29.5	17.6	6.0	6.2	2.7	4.7	4.7	1.6	0.7	35.1	45.0
Öckerö	Västra Götaland	89.7	8,725	20.4	30.2	10.6	5.3	2.9	4.0	6.9	16.9	2.3	0.6	29.7	56.9
Ödeshög	Östergötland	87.4	3,536	31.5	18.4	17.4	4.9	9.4	3.0	2.7	10.0	1.9	0.8	39.4	40.5
Örebro	Örebro	86.9	92,429	32.4	21.0	11.6	8.4	5.1	5.7	5.4	6.2	3.3	1.0	46.5	37.7
Örkelljunga	Skåne	83.5	6,071	28.0	18.1	26.6	3.8	6.0	2.4	3.0	9.9	0.8	1.4	34.1	37.1
Örnsköldsvik	Västernorrland	86.8	37,394	49.9	14.9	7.0	3.5	9.0	4.3	2.8	6.2	1.6	0.8	57.7	32.9
Östersund	Jämtland	86.2	40,601	37.9	18.9	9.3	7.3	9.7	6.6	3.7	2.7	3.2	0.7	51.8	35.0
Österåker	Stockholm	88.2	25,813	20.4	37.4	9.8	7.8	5.8	3.5	7.6	5.1	2.0	0.8	31.7	55.8
Östhammar	Uppsala	85.2	14,343	38.2	21.0	13.2	3.7	9.0	4.3	4.2	3.2	1.9	1.4	46.1	37.0
Östra Göinge	Skåne	85.5	8,855	35.8	16.4	26.0	3.7	5.8	3.3	3.1	3.7	1.3	0.9	42.8	29.0
Överkalix	Norrbotten	85.4	2,382	52.5	8.1	13.0	2.2	8.9	10.5	1.8	1.1	1.5	0.5	65.2	19.9
Övertorneå	Norrbotten	80.5	2,733	47.2	10.6	11.0	2.8	11.1	10.1	2.2	3.6	1.1	0.4	60.0	27.4
		85.8	6,231,573	31.0	23.3	12.9	6.9	6.1	5.7	5.4	4.6	3.1	1.0	43.6	39.4
Source: val.se

== Municipal results ==
Social Democratic

Moderate Party

Sweden Democrats

Green Party

Centre Party

Left Party

Liberal People's Party

Christian Democrats

Feminist Initiative

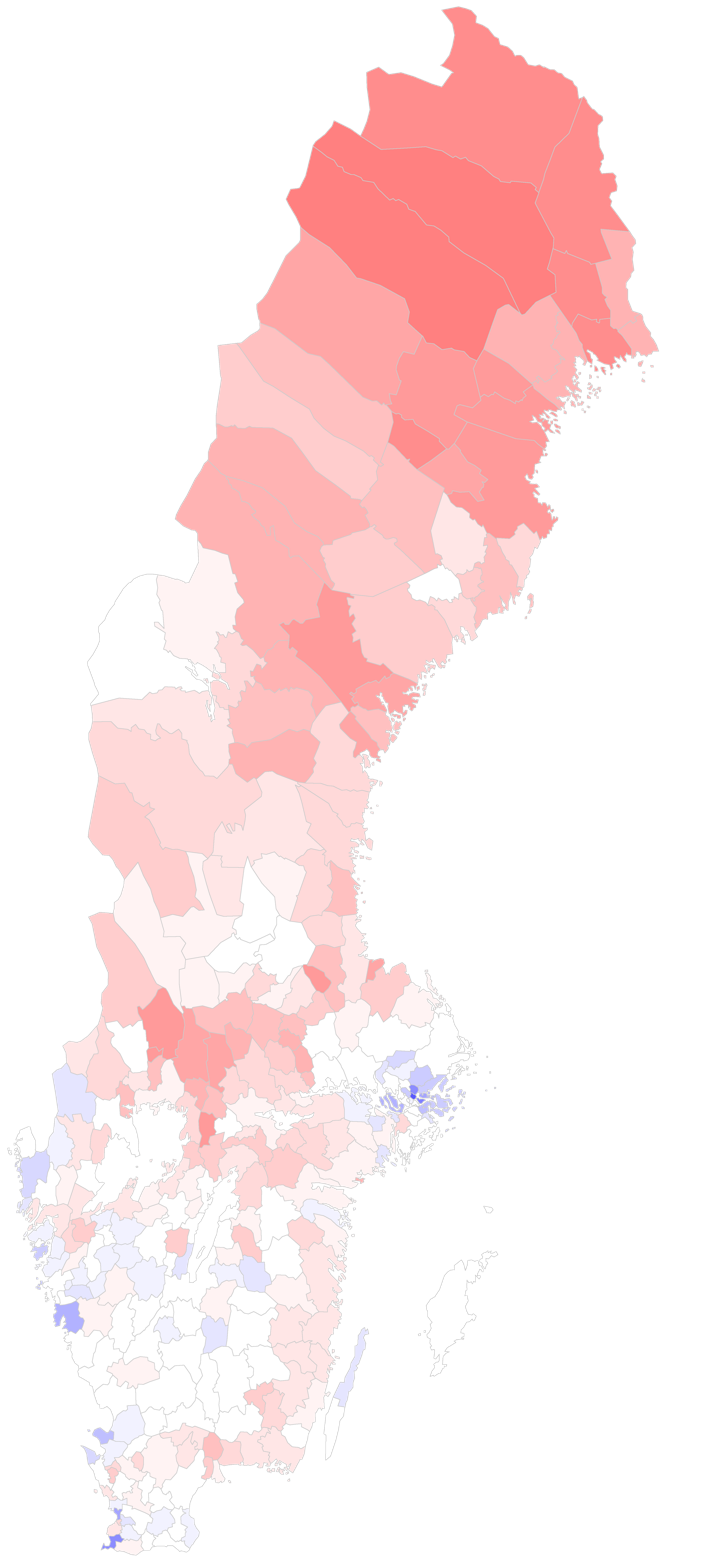
Shaded, red (S+V+MP) to blue (M+C+FP+KD)

=== Blekinge ===
Location	Turnout	Share	Votes	S	M	SD	MP	C	V	FP	KD	F!	Other	Left	Right
Karlshamn	85.9	20.5	20,992	38.7	18.9	18.4	5.7	4.8	5.0	2.9	3.1	2.0	0.7	49.3	29.5
Karlskrona	87.9	41.8	42,727	36.3	20.7	15.5	5.4	5.8	4.6	5.2	3.9	1.8	0.8	46.3	35.7
Olofström	83.8	8.2	8,372	45.9	13.4	19.1	3.5	5.6	4.9	2.0	3.4	1.2	0.9	54.3	24.5
Ronneby	86.8	18.3	18,695	36.0	17.8	21.5	3.9	6.9	5.2	3.5	2.9	1.5	0.8	45.1	31.1
Sölvesborg	87.0	11.2	11,439	33.0	22.7	25.0	3.9	4.6	3.2	2.8	3.0	1.3	0.7	40.0	33.0
Total	86.8	1.6	102,225	37.2	19.4	18.5	4.9	5.7	4.6	3.9	3.4	1.7	0.8	46.7	32.4
Source: val.se

=== Dalarna ===
Location	Turnout	Share	Votes	S	M	SD	MP	C	V	FP	KD	F!	Other	Left	Right
Avesta	86.0	7.9	14,654	41.8	15.4	19.4	3.6	5.3	5.6	3.1	3.0	1.5	1.0	50.9	27.2
Borlänge	86.2	17.2	31,740	37.3	18.0	17.7	5.6	5.1	6.2	3.7	3.2	2.3	1.1	49.0	30.0
Falun	87.4	20.7	38,251	30.2	23.2	12.8	7.2	8.0	5.9	4.5	3.8	3.3	1.0	43.3	39.5
Gagnef	88.1	3.7	6,771	32.7	18.1	17.3	4.3	11.6	5.1	3.1	4.2	2.6	0.9	42.2	37.0
Hedemora	84.6	5.4	9,923	35.0	17.7	17.5	4.5	9.3	6.1	2.8	3.1	2.5	1.6	45.6	32.9
Leksand	87.5	5.7	10,584	29.4	23.7	11.8	5.8	10.0	4.9	3.8	7.4	2.5	0.7	40.1	44.9
Ludvika	85.5	9.1	16,841	40.6	15.4	20.0	4.6	4.1	7.6	3.1	2.4	1.7	0.5	52.9	25.0
Malung-Sälen	85.3	3.6	6,674	36.2	22.6	17.3	2.7	8.6	4.7	3.7	2.4	0.9	1.0	43.6	37.2
Mora	84.5	7.3	13,457	35.5	19.5	16.9	4.6	9.9	4.5	2.9	3.1	1.7	1.3	44.6	35.4
Orsa	84.8	2.5	4,607	33.1	14.5	20.8	5.0	10.7	5.7	2.8	3.2	2.9	1.5	43.7	31.1
Rättvik	84.6	4.0	7,458	31.7	21.4	17.0	4.8	10.2	4.5	3.6	3.4	1.9	1.5	41.0	38.6
Smedjebacken	87.4	4.0	7,391	44.1	15.0	18.5	3.6	5.4	6.7	1.9	2.1	1.9	0.8	54.4	24.4
Säter	87.3	4.0	7,405	33.6	18.6	18.8	3.8	10.4	5.4	2.9	3.2	2.3	0.9	42.8	35.2
Vansbro	84.4	2.4	4,441	36.5	14.4	16.2	2.7	14.2	5.7	2.2	5.9	0.8	1.3	45.0	36.7
Älvdalen	85.6	2.5	4,714	41.5	13.5	21.8	2.3	9.6	4.5	2.3	2.2	1.2	1.1	48.3	27.7
Total	86.2	3.0	184,911	35.4	19.0	16.8	5.1	7.8	5.8	3.4	3.5	2.3	1.0	46.3	33.7
Source: val.se

=== Gotland ===
Location	Turnout	Share	Votes	S	M	SD	MP	C	V	FP	KD	F!	Other	Left	Right
Gotland	86.5	100.0	39,655	32.2	21.3	8.2	7.2	13.4	5.8	3.8	2.8	4.4	0.8	45.2	41.2
Total	86.5	0.6	39,655	32.2	21.3	8.2	7.2	13.4	5.8	3.8	2.8	4.4	0.8	45.2	41.2
Source: val.se

=== Gävleborg ===
Location	Turnout	Share	Votes	S	M	SD	MP	C	V	FP	KD	F!	Other	Left	Right
Bollnäs	83.9	9.4	17,170	38.9	15.2	18.6	4.2	8.4	5.9	3.1	3.2	2.0	0.6	48.9	29.9
Gävle	86.8	35.0	64,299	34.1	21.0	15.8	6.2	4.3	6.7	5.1	3.2	2.6	1.0	47.0	33.6
Hofors	84.1	3.3	6,100	47.4	11.2	16.0	3.0	4.5	10.8	2.8	1.7	1.6	1.0	61.2	20.2
Hudiksvall	84.5	13.3	24,350	38.4	16.2	13.8	6.0	9.2	7.0	2.8	3.3	2.5	0.9	51.4	31.5
Ljusdal	83.0	6.6	12,119	36.5	18.8	16.6	4.9	8.6	5.6	3.2	2.5	2.6	0.9	46.9	32.9
Nordanstig	84.8	3.4	6,204	38.7	14.6	18.2	3.7	9.4	5.8	3.4	3.7	1.8	0.9	48.1	31.1
Ockelbo	85.2	2.1	3,881	38.4	12.9	20.7	3.7	11.3	5.9	2.1	2.2	2.0	0.7	47.9	28.6
Ovanåker	85.1	4.2	7,684	36.5	14.4	16.0	3.5	13.4	3.8	2.2	8.2	1.1	0.9	43.8	38.2
Sandviken	86.1	13.5	24,741	43.7	15.5	15.3	3.9	5.1	7.1	3.7	2.7	1.8	1.0	54.7	27.1
Söderhamn	84.6	9.2	16,967	43.6	15.0	15.8	4.1	6.9	6.2	2.6	2.8	1.7	1.2	53.9	27.3
Total	85.4	2.9	183,515	38.2	17.4	16.0	5.0	6.7	6.6	3.7	3.2	2.2	1.0	49.8	31.0
Source: val.se

=== Halland ===
Location	Turnout	Share	Votes	S	M	SD	MP	C	V	FP	KD	F!	Other	Left	Right
Falkenberg	86.2	13.6	28,099	32.6	23.2	13.0	5.7	11.3	3.9	4.0	3.9	1.7	0.6	42.2	42.5
Halmstad	86.0	30.5	62,999	33.4	24.6	12.4	6.2	6.3	4.5	5.4	3.9	1.8	1.6	44.1	40.1
Hylte	84.3	3.0	6,123	36.6	17.3	18.5	2.9	12.1	2.9	4.2	3.3	1.1	1.1	42.4	36.9
Kungsbacka	90.3	25.4	52,386	17.1	38.0	12.0	6.0	7.6	2.9	8.1	5.5	2.0	0.8	26.0	59.2
Laholm	86.0	7.6	15,661	27.0	24.8	18.3	5.1	11.3	3.0	3.9	3.9	1.5	1.3	35.1	43.8
Varberg	88.5	20.0	41,291	31.4	25.2	11.6	6.1	9.1	4.2	5.2	4.2	2.0	1.0	41.6	43.8
Total	87.5	3.5	206,559	28.4	27.7	12.9	5.9	8.4	3.8	5.7	4.4	1.8	1.1	38.0	46.2
Source: val.se

=== Jämtland ===
Location	Turnout	Share	Votes	S	M	SD	MP	C	V	FP	KD	F!	Other	Left	Right
Berg	84.9	5.7	4,757	39.0	17.0	14.1	3.8	15.6	4.5	1.8	1.7	1.8	0.7	47.3	36.1
Bräcke	83.9	5.0	4,226	47.4	13.0	12.6	2.8	11.6	6.2	2.0	1.3	1.3	1.7	56.4	28.1
Härjedalen	82.8	8.1	6,765	42.9	17.1	15.2	3.0	10.5	5.2	2.1	1.9	1.5	0.7	51.0	31.6
Krokom	85.7	11.1	9,253	37.0	17.6	10.7	4.7	15.6	6.6	2.3	2.8	2.0	0.7	48.3	38.4
Ragunda	83.5	4.2	3,551	48.4	9.4	13.8	2.7	12.8	7.2	1.2	1.6	1.8	1.0	58.3	25.0
Strömsund	83.9	9.3	7,755	49.7	11.5	14.1	2.2	10.2	7.2	1.1	2.1	1.3	0.7	59.1	24.8
Åre	86.1	8.1	6,806	31.6	21.6	9.4	8.8	13.7	4.9	3.1	4.0	2.4	0.6	45.3	42.3
Östersund	86.2	48.5	40,601	37.9	18.9	9.3	7.3	9.7	6.6	3.7	2.7	3.2	0.7	51.8	35.0
Total	85.3	1.3	83,714	39.8	17.3	11.0	5.7	11.3	6.3	2.8	2.5	2.4	0.8	51.7	34.0
Source: val.se

=== Jönköping ===
Location	Turnout	Share	Votes	S	M	SD	MP	C	V	FP	KD	F!	Other	Left	Right
Aneby	89.1	2.0	4,425	29.1	16.8	16.5	4.8	12.3	2.6	2.9	13.5	0.8	0.6	36.5	45.5
Eksjö	87.0	5.0	11,143	30.9	20.5	13.3	5.4	11.2	3.4	4.2	8.6	1.6	0.9	39.7	44.6
Gislaved	85.1	8.1	18,152	35.4	21.9	15.9	3.7	10.1	3.1	3.2	5.4	0.8	0.6	42.1	40.5
Gnosjö	85.1	2.6	5,770	30.5	20.7	15.9	3.4	8.5	2.6	2.9	14.2	0.8	0.4	36.5	46.4
Habo	91.6	3.2	7,254	27.7	22.7	15.4	5.4	6.5	3.2	3.7	13.4	1.1	0.9	36.3	46.3
Jönköping	87.1	38.7	86,829	30.5	21.9	12.5	6.8	5.8	4.6	4.2	11.1	1.9	0.7	41.9	43.0
Mullsjö	89.2	2.1	4,752	28.6	16.7	16.0	6.0	5.1	4.8	3.4	17.0	1.4	1.0	39.4	42.2
Nässjö	87.1	8.6	19,218	33.8	16.7	19.3	5.1	7.0	4.1	2.8	9.2	1.2	0.7	43.1	35.7
Sävsjö	86.8	3.1	6,993	27.4	17.8	18.7	2.6	11.5	2.7	2.3	15.3	0.8	0.8	32.8	48.9
Tranås	87.4	5.5	12,308	36.1	18.9	15.5	5.5	6.4	4.0	3.7	7.7	1.6	0.6	45.6	36.8
Vaggeryd	87.0	3.8	8,525	34.3	17.8	15.5	4.1	8.0	3.5	3.1	11.9	1.0	0.9	41.8	40.8
Vetlanda	86.4	7.7	17,403	32.1	18.3	16.4	4.1	11.0	3.5	3.5	9.3	1.1	0.7	39.6	42.1
Värnamo	86.8	9.7	21,824	33.8	20.4	13.4	4.1	10.9	3.0	3.0	9.8	1.0	0.6	40.9	44.0
Total	87.0	3.6	224,596	31.8	20.3	14.6	5.4	7.9	3.9	3.6	10.4	1.4	0.7	41.1	42.2
Source: val.se

=== Kalmar ===
Location	Turnout	Share	Votes	S	M	SD	MP	C	V	FP	KD	F!	Other	Left	Right
Borgholm	87.0	4.8	7,587	25.6	24.6	15.3	4.5	14.7	3.7	3.5	5.1	2.3	0.8	33.7	47.8
Emmaboda	85.9	3.8	6,028	40.1	16.6	15.3	3.9	11.1	4.6	1.7	4.0	1.6	0.9	48.7	33.5
Hultsfred	84.1	5.5	8,767	39.6	14.3	17.6	2.7	10.9	4.1	2.1	6.6	1.1	1.0	46.4	33.9
Högsby	85.7	2.3	3,628	39.3	14.7	19.9	2.3	10.6	4.1	1.9	5.3	1.1	0.7	45.7	32.6
Kalmar	87.6	27.5	43,711	32.7	23.5	13.1	6.9	6.8	4.5	4.5	4.4	2.7	0.9	44.2	39.1
Mönsterås	87.5	5.6	8,830	39.1	16.9	18.3	3.1	9.6	4.5	2.4	4.3	1.2	0.7	46.6	33.2
Mörbylånga	90.3	6.4	10,127	29.3	24.8	15.2	5.5	9.7	3.8	4.1	4.5	2.6	0.5	38.6	43.1
Nybro	85.6	8.2	13,001	36.8	17.2	17.2	3.4	10.5	5.3	2.6	4.6	1.3	1.2	45.5	34.9
Oskarshamn	86.6	11.1	17,615	37.8	21.0	16.3	3.3	4.6	4.9	4.4	5.8	1.3	0.7	46.0	35.8
Torsås	87.1	3.0	4,727	33.5	16.1	20.8	3.2	13.7	3.2	3.4	4.1	1.3	0.8	39.9	37.3
Vimmerby	86.6	6.5	10,314	36.3	18.9	15.5	3.9	11.6	4.4	2.3	5.0	1.4	0.9	44.5	37.8
Västervik	85.4	15.4	24,487	39.3	19.3	13.6	4.5	7.9	5.1	3.8	3.9	1.8	0.9	48.9	34.8
Total	86.7	2.5	158,822	35.5	20.3	15.3	4.7	8.7	4.6	3.5	4.7	1.9	0.8	44.7	37.3
Source: val.se

=== Kronoberg ===
Location	Turnout	Share	Votes	S	M	SD	MP	C	V	FP	KD	F!	Other	Left	Right
Alvesta	86.5	10.0	12,114	31.0	20.5	21.6	3.5	10.6	4.1	2.4	4.2	1.3	0.8	38.6	37.7
Lessebo	87.3	4.2	5,014	41.5	16.3	18.0	4.6	6.8	5.8	2.1	2.4	1.9	0.7	51.9	27.6
Ljungby	85.2	14.7	17,712	33.4	20.3	16.4	4.2	10.2	4.2	3.1	5.8	1.3	1.1	41.8	39.4
Markaryd	83.9	4.9	5,939	34.5	19.6	21.1	3.5	7.5	2.4	1.7	7.4	0.9	1.4	40.4	36.2
Tingsryd	84.9	6.6	7,952	31.2	20.3	20.4	2.8	13.1	3.6	2.2	4.4	1.3	0.6	37.6	40.0
Uppvidinge	85.7	4.7	5,707	33.4	17.7	20.0	2.9	13.2	4.2	2.7	3.7	1.3	0.8	40.5	37.3
Växjö	87.9	46.6	56,319	31.3	24.0	12.2	7.2	7.6	5.2	4.3	5.0	2.4	0.7	43.7	40.9
Älmhult	86.2	8.3	10,018	33.5	22.5	15.0	5.2	10.0	3.4	3.1	5.1	1.4	0.8	42.1	40.7
Total	86.7	1.9	120,775	32.4	21.9	15.6	5.4	9.1	4.5	3.4	5.0	1.8	0.8	42.4	39.4
Source: val.se

=== Norrbotten ===
Location	Turnout	Share	Votes	S	M	SD	MP	C	V	FP	KD	F!	Other	Left	Right
Arjeplog	80.3	1.1	1,851	44.2	9.8	14.7	3.5	6.9	12.0	3.3	3.5	1.7	0.5	59.6	23.4
Arvidsjaur	85.0	2.6	4,326	52.1	10.1	13.1	1.6	6.2	10.2	3.1	1.8	1.2	0.6	63.9	21.2
Boden	86.5	11.4	18,890	46.5	15.4	14.7	3.6	3.7	6.6	4.1	2.8	2.0	0.6	56.8	26.0
Gällivare	82.2	7.3	12,108	50.5	10.8	15.2	4.2	1.8	11.6	1.4	2.3	1.6	0.6	66.3	16.3
Haparanda	70.4	2.6	4,323	50.3	13.3	13.5	2.9	8.4	4.8	1.8	2.7	1.6	0.7	58.1	26.1
Jokkmokk	81.7	2.0	3,296	48.5	9.1	12.8	9.5	2.4	9.7	3.2	1.3	2.9	0.7	67.6	16.0
Kalix	85.3	6.6	10,979	55.7	11.5	11.5	4.1	4.7	6.3	2.4	2.1	1.3	0.3	66.1	18.7
Kiruna	84.3	9.0	14,964	47.4	10.3	13.2	5.2	2.9	11.6	2.3	3.4	2.8	0.9	64.2	18.9
Luleå	87.6	31.1	51,682	44.7	15.9	8.8	6.6	4.6	7.5	4.4	3.2	3.0	1.2	58.8	28.2
Pajala	80.9	2.4	4,024	46.2	9.5	11.4	2.3	3.3	17.9	1.6	5.3	2.0	0.6	66.4	19.7
Piteå	88.8	17.6	29,203	53.6	11.6	7.6	4.6	5.0	8.0	2.9	3.5	2.7	0.5	66.2	22.4
Älvsbyn	84.9	3.3	5,416	53.5	8.1	12.8	2.2	6.1	9.2	2.7	3.2	1.5	0.8	64.8	20.1
Överkalix	85.4	1.4	2,382	52.5	8.1	13.0	2.2	8.9	10.5	1.8	1.1	1.5	0.5	65.2	19.9
Övertorneå	80.5	1.6	2,733	47.2	10.6	11.0	2.8	11.1	10.1	2.2	3.6	1.1	0.4	60.0	27.4
Total	85.6	2.7	166,177	48.7	12.9	11.0	4.9	4.5	8.6	3.2	3.0	2.4	0.8	62.2	23.7
Source: val.se

=== Skåne ===
==== Malmö ====
Location	Turnout	Share	Votes	S	M	SD	MP	C	V	FP	KD	F!	Other	Left	Right
Malmö	79.7	100.0	179,103	29.3	23.2	13.5	8.6	2.7	7.6	5.6	2.6	5.6	1.4	45.5	34.0
Total	79.7	2.9	179,103	29.3	23.2	13.5	8.6	2.7	7.6	5.6	2.6	5.6	1.4	45.5	34.0
Source: val.se

==== Skåne NE ====
Location	Turnout	Share	Votes	S	M	SD	MP	C	V	FP	KD	F!	Other	Left	Right
Bromölla	85.8	4.1	8,029	37.9	15.3	28.4	4.2	3.0	4.5	3.0	2.1	1.0	0.5	46.6	23.4
Båstad	86.9	5.1	10,086	18.2	34.7	14.8	6.3	10.1	2.2	6.1	5.4	1.7	0.6	26.6	56.3
Hässleholm	85.1	16.6	32,633	29.9	19.0	23.5	6.9	6.1	3.1	3.8	5.1	1.8	0.8	39.9	34.1
Klippan	81.9	5.1	10,077	33.7	19.1	25.6	3.8	5.3	3.4	2.8	4.1	1.3	0.9	40.9	31.2
Kristianstad	84.6	26.4	51,872	29.8	22.5	21.5	5.9	5.2	3.1	6.4	3.3	1.6	0.8	38.8	37.3
Osby	85.5	4.2	8,244	35.2	16.1	25.4	4.2	5.9	3.4	2.7	4.9	1.2	0.9	42.9	29.6
Perstorp	80.8	2.1	4,171	37.1	17.4	25.3	4.2	4.9	3.3	3.1	2.8	1.0	1.0	44.6	28.1
Simrishamn	84.8	6.7	13,094	26.1	25.1	19.2	5.8	7.6	3.6	4.5	3.6	3.9	0.6	35.5	40.8
Tomelilla	84.4	4.2	8,326	28.6	20.4	25.5	4.2	9.6	2.6	3.0	2.3	2.4	1.2	35.5	35.4
Åstorp	80.1	4.3	8,360	38.7	17.8	24.1	3.9	4.0	3.1	3.1	3.2	1.1	1.0	45.7	28.1
Ängelholm	85.7	13.7	26,882	26.5	29.5	17.6	6.0	6.2	2.7	4.7	4.7	1.6	0.7	35.1	45.0
Örkelljunga	83.5	3.1	6,071	28.0	18.1	26.6	3.8	6.0	2.4	3.0	9.9	0.8	1.4	34.1	37.1
Östra Göinge	85.5	4.5	8,855	35.8	16.4	26.0	3.7	5.8	3.3	3.1	3.7	1.3	0.9	42.8	29.0
Total	84.6	3.2	196,700	30.0	22.1	22.2	5.5	6.0	3.1	4.5	4.1	1.7	0.8	38.5	36.8
Source: val.se

==== Skåne S ====
Location	Turnout	Share	Votes	S	M	SD	MP	C	V	FP	KD	F!	Other	Left	Right
Burlöv	80.6	4.0	9,661	36.7	21.1	19.3	6.1	3.0	4.3	4.9	1.8	1.8	0.9	47.1	30.9
Kävlinge	89.7	8.1	19,329	27.1	29.4	18.9	5.8	5.6	2.0	6.4	2.8	1.2	0.7	35.0	44.2
Lomma	92.9	6.5	15,473	17.4	39.9	12.6	5.8	5.8	1.3	9.9	5.0	1.6	0.6	24.5	60.6
Lund	88.6	31.6	75,844	22.6	22.7	9.2	12.3	5.7	6.4	9.8	4.0	6.0	1.3	36.1	42.1
Sjöbo	84.2	4.9	11,830	23.7	23.2	30.0	3.9	7.7	2.3	2.8	3.4	2.0	1.0	29.9	37.2
Skurup	85.7	4.0	9,556	28.6	23.6	25.1	3.9	6.7	3.3	3.8	2.3	1.7	0.9	35.9	36.5
Staffanstorp	89.7	6.2	14,766	25.4	31.1	17.3	5.9	5.4	2.4	6.3	3.4	1.7	1.1	33.7	46.1
Svedala	88.9	5.4	12,922	26.6	26.9	24.1	5.1	4.4	2.1	5.4	2.9	1.5	1.1	33.8	39.5
Trelleborg	84.6	11.3	27,191	32.8	23.9	23.8	4.3	4.0	2.5	3.9	2.5	1.4	1.0	39.5	34.2
Vellinge	91.4	9.8	23,522	12.0	48.6	16.5	3.6	4.3	1.0	7.9	4.6	1.1	0.5	16.6	65.4
Ystad	85.7	8.2	19,751	30.1	28.1	16.8	5.3	6.2	2.9	4.7	3.0	2.0	0.9	38.2	42.0
Total	87.9	3.8	239,845	24.6	28.2	16.6	7.3	5.3	3.6	7.0	3.5	2.9	1.0	35.4	44.1
Source: val.se

==== Skåne W ====
Location	Turnout	Share	Votes	S	M	SD	MP	C	V	FP	KD	F!	Other	Left	Right
Bjuv	81.0	4.7	8,470	40.4	16.8	25.7	3.7	3.2	3.5	2.6	2.2	1.0	0.9	47.6	24.8
Eslöv	84.4	11.0	19,986	32.8	20.0	21.5	5.7	6.7	3.7	4.4	2.3	2.0	0.9	42.3	33.4
Helsingborg	82.7	45.9	83,482	29.5	27.3	17.4	6.7	3.4	4.1	5.3	3.4	1.9	0.9	40.4	39.4
Höganäs	87.7	9.3	16,846	22.0	33.9	14.8	6.3	5.3	3.0	6.4	5.4	2.1	0.9	31.3	50.9
Hörby	84.0	5.2	9,503	24.9	19.4	27.4	4.8	9.0	2.7	4.0	3.7	1.9	2.1	32.5	36.1
Höör	86.5	5.6	10,108	25.5	22.4	21.0	7.8	7.0	4.2	4.8	3.8	2.4	1.2	37.5	37.9
Landskrona	81.9	13.9	25,354	37.3	19.9	18.8	5.0	2.8	4.2	7.0	2.0	1.9	1.0	46.5	31.7
Svalöv	85.2	4.5	8,260	29.3	17.8	26.4	4.7	9.7	3.1	3.5	2.6	2.2	0.9	37.1	33.5
Total	83.5	2.9	182,009	30.3	24.5	19.3	6.1	4.6	3.8	5.2	3.2	1.9	1.0	40.2	37.5
Source: val.se

=== Stockholm ===
==== Stockholm (city) ====
Location	Turnout	Share	Votes	S	M	SD	MP	C	V	FP	KD	F!	Other	Left	Right
Stockholm NE	89.2	18.1	104,538	10.2	42.3	5.8	7.9	6.3	11.5	6.9	3.8	4.7	0.7	21.9	66.9
Stockholm NW	76.8	13.4	77,412	35.1	22.7	7.7	9.4	3.1	7.9	5.6	4.0	3.4	1.2	52.4	35.3
Stockholm S	89.3	20.1	116,256	19.5	23.2	5.8	14.2	5.0	9.8	7.6	3.1	11.1	0.8	43.5	38.8
Stockholm SE	83.5	15.5	89,808	29.1	18.9	8.0	12.3	3.5	10.7	4.9	2.7	8.5	1.3	52.1	30.1
Stockholm SW	84.7	15.8	91,262	26.2	21.9	6.9	12.3	4.3	9.6	6.0	3.1	8.7	1.0	48.1	35.2
Stockholm W	89.7	17.0	98,289	14.5	35.1	6.2	10.3	6.5	4.9	10.6	5.6	5.5	0.8	29.7	57.8
Total	85.8	9.3	577,565	21.6	27.7	6.6	11.1	4.9	7.7	7.9	4.3	7.2	0.9	40.5	44.7
Source: val.se

==== Stockholm County ====
Location	Turnout	Share	Votes	S	M	SD	MP	C	V	FP	KD	F!	Other	Left	Right
Botkyrka	77.8	5.7	43,727	36.1	22.1	10.3	8.1	2.7	6.8	4.8	5.7	2.3	1.1	51.1	35.2
Danderyd	90.8	2.8	21,264	6.8	50.0	5.3	4.7	7.1	1.3	11.9	10.5	1.8	0.6	12.9	79.5
Ekerö	90.7	2.2	17,013	16.1	38.9	9.3	8.3	7.1	3.2	7.3	6.3	2.9	0.7	27.5	59.6
Haninge	83.5	6.1	46,666	30.4	28.5	12.3	7.5	3.5	5.1	5.2	3.7	2.3	1.5	43.0	40.9
Huddinge	83.5	7.5	57,254	26.9	30.5	10.4	8.5	4.2	5.4	6.0	4.1	3.0	1.0	40.7	44.8
Järfälla	85.5	5.5	42,200	28.6	29.0	10.2	7.7	4.0	5.9	6.1	5.0	2.4	1.1	42.2	44.1
Lidingö	88.9	3.9	29,568	11.0	44.7	6.4	6.4	7.0	2.0	11.6	7.9	2.5	0.4	19.4	71.2
Nacka	88.7	7.7	59,114	17.7	37.1	6.5	9.6	6.3	4.3	8.5	5.2	3.9	0.8	31.5	57.2
Norrtälje	85.4	5.0	38,444	29.9	27.9	12.4	6.3	7.4	4.5	4.6	3.6	2.3	1.1	40.6	43.5
Nykvarn	89.4	0.8	6,106	26.3	31.5	18.0	5.6	5.8	2.5	4.5	3.8	1.2	0.8	34.3	45.6
Nynäshamn	85.1	2.2	16,995	30.6	26.4	14.7	6.4	4.3	5.1	5.3	3.8	2.3	1.1	42.0	39.9
Salem	87.8	1.3	9,728	24.9	30.7	11.4	7.8	5.3	4.2	6.9	5.6	2.4	0.8	36.9	48.5
Sigtuna	82.5	3.2	24,526	28.3	30.2	12.8	6.5	4.3	4.6	5.0	5.2	2.0	1.0	39.4	44.7
Sollentuna	87.7	5.5	41,878	20.2	36.1	7.1	8.2	5.6	4.2	8.8	6.4	2.5	0.9	32.6	56.9
Solna	85.9	6.1	46,764	22.5	29.9	7.7	10.0	4.9	6.7	8.1	4.4	4.7	1.0	39.2	47.4
Sundbyberg	84.1	3.4	25,866	27.7	27.1	9.2	10.1	4.2	7.1	6.2	3.6	3.8	1.2	44.9	41.0
Södertälje	77.9	6.2	47,151	32.0	23.1	12.3	7.3	3.8	5.8	4.6	6.9	2.7	1.4	45.1	38.4
Tyresö	88.7	3.7	28,236	24.0	34.5	9.6	8.4	4.6	4.3	6.5	4.6	2.6	1.0	36.7	50.1
Täby	89.8	5.7	43,791	12.5	45.3	6.4	6.1	6.4	2.2	11.3	7.0	1.9	0.8	20.9	70.0
Upplands-Bro	85.6	1.9	14,874	29.6	27.3	12.3	6.4	4.0	4.9	6.7	5.7	1.9	1.3	40.9	43.7
Upplands Väsby	84.1	3.2	24,527	30.3	28.4	10.9	6.8	3.7	5.8	6.1	4.5	2.1	1.3	43.0	42.7
Vallentuna	89.3	2.6	20,051	19.6	36.3	10.3	8.3	6.8	3.2	7.0	4.9	2.3	1.2	31.1	55.1
Vaxholm	90.6	1.0	7,384	15.2	41.1	6.7	8.5	7.9	3.2	8.7	5.5	2.6	0.7	26.8	63.2
Värmdö	89.3	3.3	25,255	20.3	37.4	10.4	8.3	5.4	3.7	6.2	4.3	3.1	0.8	32.4	53.3
Österåker	88.2	3.4	25,813	20.4	37.4	9.8	7.8	5.8	3.5	7.6	5.1	2.0	0.8	31.7	55.8
Total	85.5	12.3	764,195	24.0	32.7	9.7	7.8	5.1	4.7	7.0	5.3	2.7	1.0	36.5	50.1
Source: val.se

=== Södermanland ===
Location	Turnout	Share	Votes	S	M	SD	MP	C	V	FP	KD	F!	Other	Left	Right
Eskilstuna	84.0	34.3	61,217	35.5	21.4	16.6	6.1	4.3	5.4	4.4	3.6	2.0	0.9	46.9	33.6
Flen	85.4	5.7	10,136	36.2	18.9	17.8	4.9	7.5	5.4	3.4	3.5	1.6	0.9	46.6	33.1
Gnesta	87.2	3.9	6,880	30.2	23.4	13.2	7.7	8.7	5.9	3.3	2.9	3.6	1.0	43.8	38.3
Katrineholm	86.0	12.0	21,351	39.5	19.0	14.3	6.0	6.4	4.7	4.2	3.5	1.8	0.6	50.2	33.1
Nyköping	87.4	20.0	35,684	34.0	23.0	12.5	7.5	6.0	4.8	4.5	4.4	2.5	0.7	46.3	37.9
Oxelösund	86.0	4.3	7,597	44.1	17.1	14.0	5.2	2.7	8.0	3.4	2.8	1.9	0.8	57.3	26.0
Strängnäs	87.2	12.3	21,889	27.5	28.8	14.7	5.9	5.5	4.6	5.4	4.9	2.0	0.7	37.9	44.6
Trosa	89.4	4.5	7,983	26.6	32.3	12.2	6.6	6.4	3.5	5.1	4.3	2.2	0.8	36.7	48.1
Vingåker	88.4	3.3	5,895	39.0	16.6	20.5	4.6	6.4	4.0	2.6	3.5	1.8	0.8	47.7	29.2
Total	86.0	2.9	178,632	34.6	22.4	15.1	6.3	5.5	5.1	4.4	3.9	2.1	0.8	46.0	36.1
Source: val.se

=== Uppsala ===
Location	Turnout	Share	Votes	S	M	SD	MP	C	V	FP	KD	F!	Other	Left	Right
Enköping	86.0	11.7	26,698	30.2	26.5	13.5	5.5	8.9	3.7	5.0	4.0	1.7	1.0	39.4	44.4
Heby	85.0	3.9	8,824	35.5	16.4	16.5	3.6	13.1	4.6	2.7	4.8	1.8	1.0	43.7	37.0
Håbo	87.6	5.5	12,616	25.7	33.8	14.9	5.6	4.9	3.4	4.9	4.3	1.6	1.1	34.7	47.8
Knivsta	89.0	4.3	9,716	21.7	30.6	10.8	8.0	8.0	3.9	6.5	6.7	2.6	1.1	33.6	51.8
Tierp	85.6	5.8	13,308	42.6	15.1	14.3	4.2	9.7	5.1	2.9	2.9	1.9	1.3	51.9	30.6
Uppsala	88.2	59.9	136,810	25.9	22.3	8.1	10.6	5.9	7.7	7.4	5.2	5.6	1.3	44.1	40.9
Älvkarleby	86.7	2.6	6,036	47.1	12.8	19.8	3.8	3.1	6.2	2.8	2.2	1.4	0.7	57.1	20.9
Östhammar	85.2	6.3	14,343	38.2	21.0	13.2	3.7	9.0	4.3	4.2	3.2	1.9	1.4	46.1	37.0
Total	87.4	3.7	228,351	28.9	22.4	10.5	8.4	6.9	6.3	6.2	4.7	4.1	1.2	43.5	40.6
Source: val.se

=== Värmland ===
Location	Turnout	Share	Votes	S	M	SD	MP	C	V	FP	KD	F!	Other	Left	Right
Arvika	84.6	9.2	16,818	39.4	17.6	13.8	5.1	7.9	6.1	3.5	3.7	2.4	0.6	50.5	32.7
Eda	79.7	2.4	4,344	41.8	17.7	15.2	2.0	11.2	5.0	2.4	3.2	1.0	0.6	48.7	34.4
Filipstad	83.5	3.7	6,671	46.2	12.3	21.3	3.0	3.9	6.7	2.3	2.1	1.4	0.8	55.9	20.6
Forshaga	87.3	4.2	7,597	46.9	14.9	14.0	3.8	6.5	4.8	3.1	3.5	1.5	0.8	55.6	28.0
Grums	84.5	3.3	5,935	48.0	15.2	14.9	2.9	7.4	4.3	2.4	3.0	1.1	0.9	55.1	28.0
Hagfors	84.0	4.4	7,943	54.1	10.6	14.3	1.9	6.6	6.5	2.1	2.1	1.1	0.6	62.5	21.4
Hammarö	90.0	5.6	10,274	37.7	25.8	8.3	6.1	5.1	4.6	5.3	4.8	1.8	0.6	48.4	40.9
Karlstad	87.7	33.6	61,111	34.7	23.3	9.6	7.7	5.7	5.5	5.3	4.5	3.0	0.8	47.9	38.8
Kil	87.4	4.4	7,982	38.8	18.7	14.6	4.5	8.5	5.2	3.3	4.2	1.5	0.7	48.5	34.7
Kristinehamn	86.1	8.9	16,173	41.2	19.3	11.4	5.1	6.3	5.6	4.8	3.8	1.7	0.8	51.9	34.2
Munkfors	85.1	1.4	2,463	58.1	9.7	11.4	2.1	4.6	6.2	3.5	2.0	2.1	0.4	64.8	21.4
Storfors	86.4	1.4	2,627	49.0	12.2	17.5	2.2	6.5	6.2	1.8	3.6	0.6	0.5	57.4	24.1
Sunne	86.1	4.9	8,866	34.9	21.5	12.6	3.6	13.7	3.7	4.0	3.5	1.8	0.7	42.2	42.7
Säffle	85.2	5.6	10,109	33.2	19.1	17.9	3.3	13.6	3.5	3.4	4.2	1.2	0.6	40.1	40.3
Torsby	81.3	4.2	7,599	43.5	17.3	14.4	2.7	8.9	5.8	2.5	2.8	1.3	0.8	52.0	31.6
Årjäng	83.2	3.1	5,565	29.5	19.0	18.3	2.4	12.5	3.2	5.6	8.0	0.8	0.7	35.1	45.1
Total	86.0	2.9	182,077	39.1	19.6	12.6	5.2	7.4	5.2	4.1	4.0	2.0	0.7	49.5	35.2
Source: val.se

=== Västerbotten ===
Location	Turnout	Share	Votes	S	M	SD	MP	C	V	FP	KD	F!	Other	Left	Right
Bjurholm	84.3	0.9	1,607	37.1	21.0	10.1	1.7	12.1	4.9	5.5	6.1	1.0	0.4	43.8	44.7
Dorotea	85.7	1.1	1,872	49.2	6.9	9.6	1.6	10.9	10.7	6.6	2.7	1.3	0.5	61.5	27.1
Lycksele	83.5	4.5	7,971	46.0	14.1	10.5	2.3	4.1	10.3	3.7	7.2	1.3	0.4	58.6	29.2
Malå	83.3	1.2	2,050	50.8	8.6	10.6	2.3	4.7	13.0	4.6	3.0	1.5	0.9	66.0	20.9
Nordmaling	84.0	2.6	4,644	43.0	13.6	9.3	2.3	11.3	9.2	5.1	4.6	1.2	0.3	54.4	34.7
Norsjö	83.0	1.5	2,634	50.2	8.6	9.7	1.3	8.3	12.3	3.6	4.9	0.6	0.5	63.7	25.5
Robertsfors	85.8	2.6	4,507	42.3	11.1	6.8	3.4	16.8	8.9	2.9	4.6	2.2	0.9	54.7	35.4
Skellefteå	86.7	27.8	48,779	50.2	10.7	7.8	5.3	5.8	9.3	3.8	4.0	2.4	0.8	64.8	24.3
Sorsele	79.5	0.9	1,548	39.5	11.3	13.2	3.0	9.6	13.5	1.7	5.9	1.8	0.4	56.1	28.6
Storuman	81.3	2.2	3,881	40.4	13.1	11.6	3.0	9.4	10.2	4.0	6.5	1.2	0.5	53.6	33.1
Umeå	88.7	45.8	80,308	36.2	16.5	5.7	8.1	5.5	12.3	4.9	3.8	6.0	0.9	56.6	30.8
Vilhelmina	84.4	2.5	4,428	45.9	9.0	12.7	2.5	8.0	11.0	2.6	5.5	1.9	0.8	59.4	25.2
Vindeln	85.0	2.0	3,563	39.9	15.3	9.7	3.0	11.0	7.9	3.7	6.0	1.9	1.6	50.8	36.0
Vännäs	85.9	3.2	5,594	39.8	12.8	8.5	4.3	10.6	12.3	3.4	4.7	2.6	1.0	56.4	31.5
Åsele	84.9	1.1	1,893	44.8	11.7	10.9	1.9	10.6	9.1	5.2	3.4	1.6	0.8	55.8	30.9
Total	86.9	2.9	175,279	42.0	13.8	7.4	5.9	6.7	11.0	4.4	4.3	3.8	0.8	58.9	29.0
Source: val.se

=== Västernorrland ===
Location	Turnout	Share	Votes	S	M	SD	MP	C	V	FP	KD	F!	Other	Left	Right
Härnösand	85.4	10.1	16,338	43.2	15.5	11.0	7.0	6.5	6.4	3.3	3.3	3.0	0.8	56.6	28.6
Kramfors	85.1	7.7	12,448	51.8	11.3	9.7	3.3	9.5	7.5	1.7	2.4	2.2	0.6	62.6	24.9
Sollefteå	85.3	8.1	13,108	53.7	10.5	12.8	3.1	6.5	6.6	2.1	2.0	1.8	0.9	63.4	21.1
Sundsvall	86.4	39.8	64,556	41.2	19.7	11.7	5.1	5.3	5.6	4.5	3.4	2.6	0.9	52.0	32.8
Timrå	86.1	7.3	11,804	50.3	13.0	13.9	3.0	4.8	6.7	3.5	2.6	1.6	0.7	60.0	23.9
Ånge	84.6	4.0	6,464	49.7	11.4	16.2	1.9	7.5	5.8	1.5	2.7	1.5	1.9	57.4	23.0
Örnsköldsvik	86.8	23.1	37,394	49.9	14.9	7.0	3.5	9.0	4.3	2.8	6.2	1.6	0.8	57.7	32.9
Total	86.1	2.6	162,112	46.3	15.9	10.8	4.4	6.7	5.7	3.4	3.8	2.2	0.9	56.3	29.8
Source: val.se

=== Västmanland ===
Location	Turnout	Share	Votes	S	M	SD	MP	C	V	FP	KD	F!	Other	Left	Right
Arboga	85.2	5.4	8,975	38.3	20.6	15.5	5.2	5.5	5.0	3.9	3.5	1.7	0.8	48.5	33.6
Fagersta	83.5	4.7	7,809	45.0	15.5	18.6	4.2	2.5	6.5	2.7	2.6	1.6	0.9	55.7	23.3
Hallstahammar	83.9	5.8	9,655	45.0	15.0	16.6	4.0	3.8	6.1	3.8	3.3	1.3	1.1	55.1	25.9
Kungsör	86.2	3.2	5,332	36.3	18.7	17.5	3.6	7.2	5.0	4.9	4.4	1.6	0.8	45.0	35.2
Köping	83.9	9.5	15,938	40.7	17.4	17.4	4.0	6.0	5.6	3.7	3.1	1.3	0.7	50.2	30.3
Norberg	86.0	2.3	3,766	38.4	14.2	20.3	4.3	4.3	8.9	2.8	2.3	2.8	1.7	51.6	23.6
Sala	86.2	8.7	14,529	33.5	19.9	15.4	4.7	11.0	4.6	4.0	3.6	2.2	1.1	42.8	38.5
Skinnskatteberg	84.9	1.7	2,909	42.8	13.3	18.2	3.0	6.4	6.4	5.1	2.4	1.7	0.7	52.1	27.3
Surahammar	84.5	3.7	6,245	45.4	13.6	18.4	3.4	3.7	7.2	3.4	2.3	1.5	1.1	56.0	23.0
Västerås	85.5	55.0	91,781	32.5	24.8	12.9	5.9	4.5	5.1	6.5	4.5	2.3	1.0	43.5	40.2
Total	85.2	2.7	166,939	35.9	21.4	14.8	5.1	5.2	5.4	5.2	3.9	2.0	1.0	46.4	35.7
Source: val.se

=== Västra Götaland ===
==== Gothenburg ====
Location	Turnout	Share	Votes	S	M	SD	MP	C	V	FP	KD	F!	Other	Left	Right
Gothenburg	82.8	100.0	334,294	23.7	23.9	9.6	9.8	3.8	9.4	7.2	4.6	6.5	1.5	42.9	39.5
Total	82.8	5.4	334,294	23.7	23.9	9.6	9.8	3.8	9.4	7.2	4.6	6.5	1.5	42.9	39.5
Source: val.se

==== Västra Götaland E ====
Location	Turnout	Share	Votes	S	M	SD	MP	C	V	FP	KD	F!	Other	Left	Right
Essunga	86.8	2.1	3,692	30.7	24.2	16.0	4.1	11.4	3.8	2.8	4.3	1.9	0.7	38.7	42.8
Falköping	87.2	12.1	21,103	32.3	19.9	17.5	4.9	9.2	4.2	3.4	6.1	1.8	0.7	41.5	38.5
Grästorp	86.8	2.2	3,853	30.7	23.6	15.8	3.6	13.0	3.9	3.3	4.2	1.2	0.8	38.2	44.0
Gullspång	85.3	1.9	3,394	42.3	16.0	16.4	3.1	7.9	5.3	2.4	3.8	1.9	1.1	50.7	30.0
Götene	88.4	5.1	8,825	36.0	18.9	12.9	4.8	9.4	5.2	3.8	6.2	2.1	0.8	45.9	38.3
Hjo	88.2	3.5	6,093	30.8	23.0	14.5	5.5	7.8	4.6	5.1	6.4	1.8	0.6	40.9	42.3
Karlsborg	88.6	2.8	4,821	35.0	17.2	17.7	3.6	9.7	3.2	6.0	5.8	1.3	0.5	41.8	38.7
Lidköping	88.2	15.3	26,698	36.1	19.8	12.5	5.8	7.0	5.6	5.1	5.4	1.8	0.9	47.6	37.2
Mariestad	85.9	9.2	16,065	37.1	21.9	13.6	5.1	6.4	5.2	3.6	4.6	1.7	0.7	47.5	36.6
Skara	87.1	7.1	12,332	34.5	21.4	16.0	5.4	7.7	4.4	3.6	4.2	2.0	0.9	44.2	37.0
Skövde	87.1	20.3	35,405	32.8	23.7	12.7	5.7	7.4	4.0	5.5	4.9	2.0	1.2	42.5	41.6
Tibro	87.7	4.1	7,235	37.1	16.9	16.8	4.4	7.3	3.6	4.7	7.0	1.5	0.6	45.1	36.0
Tidaholm	87.6	4.9	8,603	43.8	15.2	16.7	4.4	6.3	4.6	2.9	4.2	1.2	0.7	52.8	28.6
Töreboda	85.0	3.4	5,944	35.6	18.4	17.3	3.7	12.1	4.1	2.6	3.9	1.4	0.8	43.4	37.1
Vara	86.0	6.0	10,382	29.6	25.7	17.1	3.4	11.0	4.0	3.3	4.1	1.1	0.7	37.0	44.1
Total	87.2	2.8	174,445	34.6	21.0	14.8	5.0	8.2	4.5	4.2	5.1	1.7	0.8	44.1	38.5
Source: val.se

==== Västra Götaland N ====
Location	Turnout	Share	Votes	S	M	SD	MP	C	V	FP	KD	F!	Other	Left	Right
Ale	86.2	10.0	17,853	32.3	22.2	16.3	5.6	5.1	6.3	4.3	4.4	2.5	1.0	44.3	36.0
Alingsås	88.2	14.7	26,316	27.5	22.6	10.8	8.9	6.7	6.0	6.9	6.9	2.9	0.8	42.4	43.1
Bengtsfors	83.6	3.4	6,058	37.5	15.9	19.2	3.3	9.6	3.7	3.0	4.5	2.3	0.9	44.6	33.0
Dals-Ed	83.7	1.6	2,892	29.4	18.5	20.3	2.7	13.8	2.8	2.8	7.1	1.4	1.2	34.8	42.2
Färgelanda	85.8	2.4	4,248	34.3	13.0	24.0	2.6	13.8	3.4	3.2	3.7	1.2	0.8	40.3	33.8
Herrljunga	87.6	3.5	6,259	28.4	18.9	17.4	4.3	12.7	4.3	4.2	7.0	1.7	1.0	37.0	42.9
Lerum	89.7	14.5	25,953	23.6	27.4	12.0	8.5	6.0	5.0	7.9	5.6	3.2	0.9	37.1	46.9
Lilla Edet	83.0	4.5	8,076	35.3	15.4	22.7	4.2	6.3	6.4	3.5	3.0	2.1	1.0	45.9	28.2
Mellerud	83.0	3.2	5,709	30.6	18.4	21.1	3.3	12.6	3.7	3.3	4.8	1.5	0.6	37.6	39.1
Trollhättan	85.1	19.9	35,703	40.6	17.9	13.5	6.1	4.1	5.8	5.3	3.7	2.3	0.8	52.5	30.9
Vårgårda	88.8	4.1	7,366	28.0	18.0	15.7	5.2	11.9	4.3	4.3	10.4	1.4	0.8	37.4	44.7
Vänersborg	86.4	13.8	24,725	34.7	17.8	15.9	6.2	6.5	6.7	4.8	4.5	2.0	0.9	47.6	33.6
Åmål	83.0	4.4	7,895	39.1	16.6	17.0	5.0	7.2	5.1	3.9	3.6	1.9	0.6	49.2	31.3
Total	86.4	2.9	179,053	32.6	20.1	15.1	6.3	6.9	5.5	5.3	5.1	2.3	0.9	44.3	37.4
Source: val.se

==== Västra Götaland S ====
Location	Turnout	Share	Votes	S	M	SD	MP	C	V	FP	KD	F!	Other	Left	Right
Bollebygd	89.6	4.6	5,802	27.0	24.6	18.5	5.2	7.9	4.3	4.7	5.1	1.8	0.8	36.6	42.3
Borås	84.9	53.9	67,295	31.4	23.3	14.4	6.8	4.9	5.8	5.2	5.1	2.2	0.8	44.0	38.6
Mark	86.4	17.7	22,161	33.2	18.9	14.8	5.4	8.9	5.6	5.2	5.2	2.0	0.9	44.2	38.2
Svenljunga	84.7	5.3	6,619	30.2	21.3	19.0	3.5	11.4	3.2	4.0	4.2	1.4	1.8	37.0	40.9
Tranemo	86.7	6.0	7,554	33.3	20.4	15.4	4.5	13.2	3.2	3.5	4.1	1.6	0.8	41.0	41.2
Ulricehamn	87.1	12.4	15,461	27.3	22.9	14.8	5.7	12.5	4.5	4.4	5.7	1.5	0.6	37.6	45.5
Total	85.7	2.0	124,892	31.1	22.3	15.0	6.0	7.5	5.2	4.9	5.1	2.0	0.8	42.3	39.8
Source: val.se

==== Västra Götaland W ====
Location	Turnout	Share	Votes	S	M	SD	MP	C	V	FP	KD	F!	Other	Left	Right
Härryda	89.3	9.9	23,152	22.6	29.5	12.6	8.0	6.2	4.6	8.2	4.9	2.6	0.9	35.1	48.8
Kungälv	89.1	12.3	28,818	26.9	26.1	13.6	6.4	6.6	4.9	6.6	5.7	2.2	0.9	38.2	45.1
Lysekil	85.2	4.1	9,746	35.4	18.0	15.9	5.8	5.3	6.1	6.2	4.2	2.5	0.6	47.3	33.7
Munkedal	83.6	2.8	6,564	31.8	19.5	19.2	3.2	9.8	5.5	3.2	5.0	1.8	1.0	40.5	37.5
Mölndal	87.5	17.3	40,637	25.3	25.5	11.6	9.1	5.1	5.8	8.4	5.3	3.1	1.0	40.1	44.3
Orust	87.1	4.5	10,559	27.4	24.4	15.2	5.4	8.6	5.3	5.9	4.5	2.6	0.7	38.1	43.5
Partille	86.8	9.9	23,242	24.9	27.3	11.6	8.0	4.5	6.1	8.0	5.4	3.0	1.2	39.0	45.2
Sotenäs	86.4	2.7	6,350	29.1	31.4	12.4	3.7	5.2	3.9	6.6	5.4	1.7	0.4	36.7	48.7
Stenungsund	88.0	7.0	16,555	27.6	28.5	13.7	6.4	5.9	4.2	6.5	4.4	2.0	0.8	38.2	45.3
Strömstad	81.4	3.0	6,956	27.0	23.0	13.5	7.6	9.5	4.6	7.3	4.1	2.6	0.7	39.2	44.0
Tanum	85.6	3.5	8,285	23.5	27.9	11.8	5.2	13.4	4.0	6.7	3.8	3.2	0.8	32.6	51.7
Tjörn	88.7	4.5	10,673	22.1	28.9	14.2	5.5	5.5	3.5	7.5	10.1	2.1	0.7	31.1	52.0
Uddevalla	85.7	14.8	34,683	33.8	20.5	15.4	6.0	4.8	6.0	4.8	5.3	2.4	0.9	45.8	35.4
Öckerö	89.7	3.7	8,725	20.4	30.2	10.6	5.3	2.9	4.0	6.9	16.9	2.3	0.6	29.7	56.9
Total	87.2	3.8	234,945	27.0	25.6	13.4	6.8	6.0	5.2	6.9	5.7	2.5	0.9	39.0	44.2
Source: val.se

=== Örebro ===
Location	Turnout	Share	Votes	S	M	SD	MP	C	V	FP	KD	F!	Other	Left	Right
Askersund	86.7	4.1	7,664	37.9	17.4	17.7	4.1	8.5	4.4	3.1	4.4	1.6	1.0	46.5	33.3
Degerfors	86.4	3.4	6,426	51.2	10.6	14.4	4.0	4.2	8.1	1.9	3.4	1.5	0.7	63.3	20.1
Hallsberg	88.3	5.4	10,280	43.6	14.6	16.7	4.3	6.2	5.0	2.9	4.3	1.6	0.7	53.0	28.1
Hällefors	82.5	2.3	4,398	47.2	12.9	18.0	3.1	4.7	6.6	2.2	2.1	1.9	1.3	57.0	21.8
Karlskoga	85.7	10.5	19,877	44.7	18.7	14.4	4.8	3.4	5.0	3.3	3.6	1.3	0.9	54.4	29.0
Kumla	87.7	7.2	13,529	38.2	18.0	16.2	5.0	5.1	4.3	5.0	5.8	1.7	0.8	47.4	33.8
Laxå	85.9	2.0	3,760	43.9	13.8	18.1	3.2	5.6	5.5	2.9	5.4	0.9	0.8	52.6	27.7
Lekeberg	88.4	2.6	4,939	30.0	16.9	18.2	4.3	13.4	4.3	3.1	6.8	1.9	1.2	38.5	40.2
Lindesberg	86.8	8.1	15,348	36.9	16.9	20.9	4.7	7.5	4.3	2.8	3.7	1.5	0.9	45.9	30.8
Ljusnarsberg	83.7	1.7	3,130	42.0	12.3	23.7	3.3	5.1	6.6	2.3	2.2	1.4	1.1	51.9	21.9
Nora	85.9	3.7	6,924	39.5	16.3	15.4	5.1	7.5	5.4	3.5	3.9	2.1	1.2	50.0	31.2
Örebro	86.9	49.0	92,429	32.4	21.0	11.6	8.4	5.1	5.7	5.4	6.2	3.3	1.0	46.5	37.7
Total	86.7	3.0	188,704	36.9	18.6	14.4	6.4	5.6	5.4	4.3	5.2	2.4	0.9	48.6	33.6
Source: val.se

=== Östergötland ===
Location	Turnout	Share	Votes	S	M	SD	MP	C	V	FP	KD	F!	Other	Left	Right
Boxholm	89.3	1.3	3,687	44.1	14.8	15.6	4.2	8.3	4.3	2.7	4.4	0.9	0.6	52.6	30.2
Finspång	86.4	4.8	13,971	43.2	16.1	15.4	4.6	5.1	5.3	3.3	4.5	1.8	0.8	53.0	29.0
Kinda	88.0	2.3	6,682	31.7	19.2	16.7	5.0	10.4	4.6	3.2	6.3	1.8	1.2	41.2	39.1
Linköping	88.0	34.4	100,372	29.1	24.2	11.2	8.2	6.1	4.7	7.0	5.8	2.6	1.2	42.0	43.1
Mjölby	87.0	6.1	17,732	37.7	21.0	14.9	4.3	6.4	4.3	4.3	4.8	1.5	0.8	46.4	36.4
Motala	87.0	9.7	28,327	39.8	18.7	16.2	4.9	5.0	4.8	4.4	3.8	1.4	1.0	49.5	31.9
Norrköping	85.3	29.6	86,258	30.9	23.2	16.3	6.9	4.5	5.5	4.5	4.6	2.7	1.0	43.3	36.8
Söderköping	88.3	3.4	9,826	27.0	26.0	16.5	5.8	8.7	3.8	4.3	5.0	1.9	1.0	36.6	44.1
Vadstena	88.1	1.8	5,277	33.2	25.2	12.5	6.2	6.8	3.8	3.8	5.8	2.2	0.6	43.1	41.5
Valdemarsvik	87.1	1.8	5,378	35.3	20.0	18.5	3.3	10.5	3.7	2.8	3.5	1.2	1.1	42.3	36.8
Ydre	90.2	0.9	2,566	29.1	17.7	14.3	4.3	16.4	3.2	3.4	9.7	1.4	0.5	36.6	47.2
Åtvidaberg	87.8	2.7	7,872	39.7	18.4	17.2	4.5	7.9	3.9	2.8	3.8	1.2	0.6	48.1	32.9
Ödeshög	87.4	1.2	3,536	31.5	18.4	17.4	4.9	9.4	3.0	2.7	10.0	1.9	0.8	39.4	40.5
Total	87.0	4.7	291,484	32.6	22.3	14.4	6.6	6.0	4.8	5.1	5.1	2.2	1.0	44.0	38.4
Source: val.se
