= Norrbotten Party =

The Norbotten Party (Norrbottenspartiet) was a minor, regional party in Sweden. The base of the party was in the most northern Swedish province, Norrbotten County, and in the local and regional parties, the Kiruna Party and the Norrbotten Healthcare Party.

In the 2002 Swedish general elections the Kiruna and NHP parties agreed to attempt parliamentary representation in the Swedish Riksdag by running as a joint alternative, trying to reach the county's 4% threshold for representation in the national parliament. The party received 0.28% of the vote, and thus didn't get representation in the Riksdag. The party dissolved shortly afterwards.

The party leader was Lars Törnman who was at the time co-Mayor (along with the Social Democrat leader) in the local municipality of Kiruna and leader of the Kiruna Party.
