= Lars Törnman =

Lars Törnman (born 6 May 1951) is a Swedish mine worker, trade union leader, politician, municipal commissioner, and mayor of Kiruna in 1994–2003 and 2008–2010 (sharing the latter post in 1998–2002 and 2008–2010). Törnman was born in Kiruna, Norrbotten County. He was a devoted Social Democrat until his founding of the Kiruna Party in 1994 and again since 2010. He made a failed attempt to reach the Riksdag of Sweden by running his Kiruna Party jointly with another local party as the Norrbotten Party (falling, with 9.1% of the vote, roughly three points short of the 12% threshold which would have allowed for a parliamentary seat for Törnman).

During the 1990s and early 2000s the Kiruna Party was the dominant political force of Kiruna, dropping the Social Democrats with over a fifth of the electorate in its first showing in 1994. Later, successes were mixed, but dwindled after 2003, when the leadership of the town was forced to resign after internal disputes. Törnman was again appointed Municipal commissioner in 2008, two years after a devastating electoral showing, but returned to the Social Democrats in 2010.
