= Kiruna Party =

Kiruna Party Kirunapartiet
- Leader: Lars Törnman
- Founded: 1994
- Dissolved: June 2022
- Split from: SAP
- Headquarters: Kiruna
- Ideology: Social democracy Regionalism; Localism
- Political position: Centre-left

Kirunapartiet (lit. 'Kiruna Party') was a local political party in Kiruna Municipality, Sweden. It was founded in 1994 as a splinter group of the local branch of the Social Democrats and was led by Lars Törnman from 1994 until 2010, when Törnman left the party for the Social Democrats. After Törnman's leaving the party, Henry Emmoth was selected as its new leader.

In the municipal elections in 1994, Kirunapartiet got 33% of the total vote, which meant that the party was the largest of the parties in the municipal government, and got the right to appoint the municipal commissioner. It held this right until 2006, when the Social Democrats received more votes in the municipal elections of that year. Following Törnman's realignment and a (failed) internal attempt to dissolve the party in favor of a stronger Social Democratic party, the municipal election of 2010 resulted in poor figures for the party.

The Kiruna Party attempted to reach parliament in 2002 (as a part of the Norrbotten Party ticket) and Norrbotten County council in 2002 and 2006, respectively. In 2006, the party failed by a mere 137 votes to gain representation.
