= Elections in Sweden =

Elections in Sweden are held once every four years. At the highest level, all 349 members of Riksdag, the national parliament of Sweden, are elected in general elections. Elections to the 20 regions (Swedish: regioner) and 290 municipal assemblies (kommunfullmäktige) – all using almost the same electoral system – are held concurrently with the legislative elections on the second Sunday in September (with effect from 2014 – until 2010 they had been held on the third Sunday in September).

Sweden also holds elections to the European Parliament, which unlike Swedish domestic elections are held in June every five years, although they are also held on a Sunday and use an almost identical electoral system. The most recent Swedish general election was held on 13 September 2026. The most recent Swedish election to the European Parliament was held on 9 June 2024.

== Electoral system ==
=== Dates ===
Elections to Sweden's county councils occur simultaneously with the general elections on the second Sunday of September. Elections to the municipal councils also occur on the second Sunday of September. Elections to the European Parliament occur every five years in May or June throughout the entire European Union; the exact day of the election varies by country according to the local tradition, thus in Sweden they happen on a Sunday.

=== Voter eligibility ===
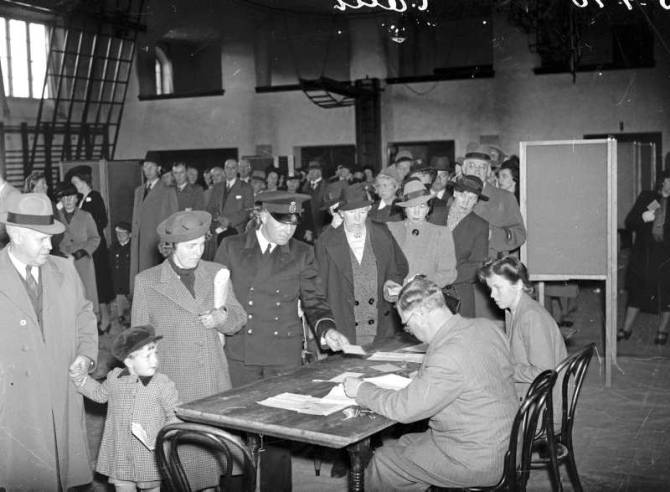
Polling station in Gothenburg, 1940 general election

To vote in a Swedish general election, one must be:

- a Swedish citizen,
- at least 18 years of age on election day,
- and have at some point been a registered resident of Sweden (thus excluding foreign-born Swedes who have never lived in Sweden)

To vote in Swedish local elections (for the county councils and municipal assemblies), one must:

- be a registered resident of the county or municipality in question and be at least 18 years of age on election day
- fall into one of the following groups:
1. Swedish citizens
2. Citizens of Iceland, Norway, or any country in the European Union
3. Citizens of any other country who have permanent residency in Sweden and have lived in Sweden for three consecutive years

In order to vote in elections to the European Parliament, one must be at least 18 years old, and fall into one of the following groups:

1. Swedish citizens who are or have been residents of Sweden
2. Citizens of any other country in the European Union who are currently residents of Sweden; such citizens, by choosing to vote in European Parliamentary elections in Sweden, become ineligible to vote in European Parliamentary elections in any other EU member state

In general, any person who is eligible to vote is also eligible to stand for election.

Sweden does not disenfranchise prisoners or those with criminal convictions. Expat Swedish citizens may however be removed from the polling register if they do not renew their registration every 10 years.

=== Voting ===
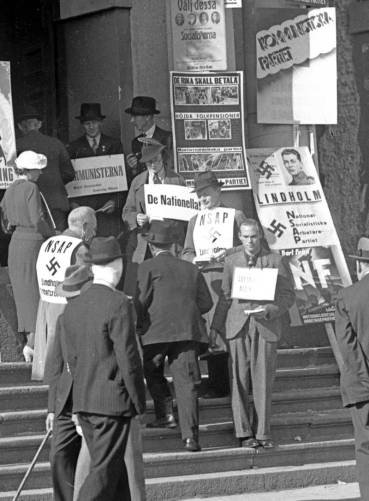
A typical feature of Swedish elections is the handing out of party ballot papers by activists of the different parties outside polling stations on election day. Photo from the 1936 election.

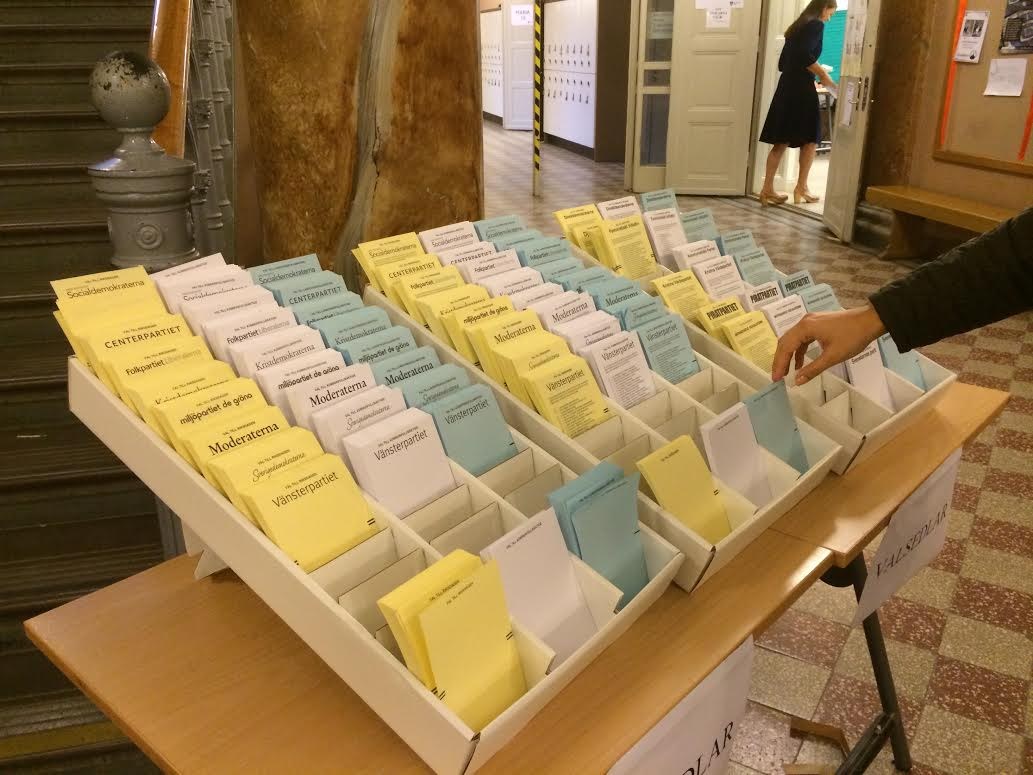
Swedish polling station with an assortment of ballots for different parties.

Unlike in many countries where voters chose from a list of candidates or parties, each party in Sweden has separate ballot papers. The ballot papers must be identical in size and material, and have different colors depending on the type of election: yellow for Riksdag elections, blue for county council elections and white for municipal elections and elections to the European Parliament.

Sweden uses open lists and utilizes apparentment between lists of the same party and constituency to form a cartel, a group of lists that are legally allied for purposes of seat allocation. A single preference vote may be indicated as well.

Swedish voters can choose between three different types of ballot papers. The party ballot paper has simply the name of a political party printed on the front and is blank on the back. This ballot is used when a voter wishes to vote for a particular party, but does not wish to give preference to a particular candidate. The name ballot paper has a party name followed by a list of candidates (which can continue on the other side). A voter using this ballot can choose (but is not required) to cast a personal vote by entering a mark next to a particular candidate, in addition to voting for their political party. Alternatively, a voter can take a blank ballot paper and write a party name on it. Finally, if a party has not registered its candidates with the election authority, it is possible for a voter to manually write the name of an arbitrary candidate. In reality, this option is almost exclusively available when voting for unestablished parties. However, it has occasionally caused individuals to be elected into the city council to represent parties they do not even support as a result of a single voter's vote.

The municipalities and the national election authority have the responsibility to organise the elections. On the election day, voting takes place in a municipal building such as a school. It is possible to do early voting, also in a municipal building which is available in day time, such as a library. Early voting can be performed anywhere in Sweden, not just in the home municipality.

Sweden, for a long time, had a policy of always displaying the ballot papers for voters to select in public. This was criticised as undemocratic and in contravention to the European Convention on Human Rights (ECHR), which stipulates that elections must be "by secret ballot". There had been a common practice of masking by selecting multiple ballot papers. After voting in the 2014 election to the European Parliament, a German citizen reported the lack of secrecy to the European Commission. The policy was changed ahead of the 2019 election to the European Parliament, such that ballot papers are selected from behind a screen. The same change was also implemented in Swedish parliamentary and local elections, and was first seen in the 2022 elections.

=== Cost of ballot papers ===
For the general elections, the State pays for the printing and distribution of ballot papers for any party which has received at least one percent of the vote nationally in either of the previous two elections. For local elections, any party that is currently represented in the legislative body in question is entitled to free printing of ballot papers.

=== Constituencies ===
In Riksdag elections, constituencies are usually coterminous with one of the Swedish counties, though the Counties of Stockholm, Skåne (containing Malmö), and Västra Götaland (containing Gothenburg) are divided into smaller electoral constituencies due to their larger populations. The number of available seats in each constituency is based on its number of voters (vis-à-vis the number of voters nationwide), and parties are apportioned seats in each constituency based on their votes in that constituency.

In County Council elections, individual municipalities—or alternatively groups of municipalities—are used as electoral constituencies. The number of seats on the county council allocated to each constituency, and the borders of these constituencies, is entirely at the discretion of each county council itself. As mandated by Swedish law, nine out of ten seats on each county council are permanent seats from a particular constituency; the remaining seats are at-large adjustment seats, used to ensure county-wide proportionality with the vote, just as with general elections.

For European parliamentary elections, all of Sweden consists of one electoral district.

=== Party list candidate selection ===
In Sweden, the seats of the Riksdag are allocated to the parties, and the prospective members are selected by their party. Sweden uses open lists and utilizes apparentement between lists of the same constituency and party to form a cartel, a group of lists that are legally allied for purposes of seat allocation. Which candidates from which lists are to secure the seats allocated to the party is determined by two factors: preference votes are first used to choose candidates which pass a certain threshold, then the number of votes cast for the various lists within that party are used. In national general elections, any candidates who receive a number of personal votes equal to five percent or greater of the party's total number of votes will automatically be bumped to the top of the list, regardless of their ranking on the list by the party. This threshold is similarly five percent for local elections and elections to the European Parliament.

Although sometimes dissatisfied party supporters put forward their own lists, the lists are usually put forward by the parties, and target different constituencies and categories of voters. Competition between lists is usually more of a feature of campaign strategies than for effective candidate preferences, and does not bear prominently in elections.

Because seats are allocated primarily to the parties and not candidates, the seat of an MP who resigns during their term in office can be taken by a replacement runner-up candidate from their own party (unlike systems such as the United Kingdom, a by-election is not triggered). In contrast to assigning the seat, resigning is a voluntary action of the MP, meaning that there exists the possibility of MPs resigning from their parties but not their seats and sitting as independents. The system of replacement runner-up candidates also means that the Prime Minister and their potential members of cabinet appear on ballot papers, but surrender their seats to replacement candidates as they are appointed as ministers (holding both posts is not permitted). This allows senior party politicians to assume roles as opposition members of parliament if they lose an election.

=== Seat allocation ===
Seats in the various legislative bodies are allocated amongst the Swedish political parties proportionally using a modified form of the Sainte-Laguë method. This modification creates a systematic preference in the mathematics behind seat distribution, favoring larger and medium-sized parties over smaller parties. It reduces the slight bias towards larger parties in the d'Hondt formula. At the core of it, the system remains intensely proportional, and thus a party which wins approximately 25% of the vote should win approximately 25% of the seats. An example of the close correlation between seats and votes can be seen below in the results of the 2002 Stockholm municipal election.

In Riksdag elections, 310 of the members are elected using a party-list proportional representation system within each of Sweden's 29 electoral constituencies. The remaining 39 seats in the Riksdag are "adjustment seats", distributed amongst the parties in numbers that will ensure that the party distribution in the Riksdag matches the distribution of the votes nationally as closely as possible. County elections use the same system. All seats on municipal assemblies are permanent; there are no adjustment seats. This can cause the distribution of seats in the municipal assemblies to differ somewhat from the actual distribution of votes in the election. The European Parliament has 751 permanent seats, 20 of which were allocated to Sweden for the 2019 election. After Brexit, an additional seat was allocated for Sweden.

In order to restrict the number of parties which win seats in the Riksdag, a threshold has been put in place. In order to win seats in the Riksdag, a party must win at least four percent of the vote nationally, or twelve percent of the vote in any electoral constituency. County elections use a lower threshold of three percent. For municipal elections, since the elections of 2018 there has been a minimum threshold of two percent in municipalities with only one constituency, and three percent in those with more than one.

Comparison of vote share vs. share of allocated seats after 2018 municipal elections:

Party	Votes (%)	Seats (%)
Social Democratic Party	27.6	29.5
Moderate Party	20.1	18.9
Sweden Democrats	12.7	14.2
Centre Party	9.7	12.6
Left Party	7.7	6.4
Liberals	6.8	5.4
Christian Democrats	5.2	5.3
Green Party	4.6	3.1

=== Terms of office ===
The assembly members are elected for a fixed term of four years. From 1970 to 1994, terms were three years; before that, normally four. The Riksdag may be dissolved earlier by a decree of the prime minister, in which case new elections are held; however, new members will hold office only until the next ordinary election, the date of which remains the same. Thus, the terms of office of the new members will be the remaining parts of the terms of the MPs in the dissolved parliament.

The unicameral Riksdag has never been dissolved by decree. The last time the second chamber of the old Riksdag was dissolved in this manner was in 1958.

The regional and local assemblies cannot be dissolved before the end of their term.

=== Party organisation ===
While parties have been very careful to maintain their original mass party image, party organisations have become increasing professionalised and dependent on the state, and less connected with their grass-roots members and civil society. Party membership has declined to 210,067 members in 2010 across all parties (3.67% of the electorate), from 1,124,917 members in 1960 (22.62% of the electorate). Political parties can be registered with the support of 1500 electors for Riksdag elections, 1500 electors for EU elections, 100 electors for county council elections, and/or 50 electors for municipal elections.

== Riksdag elections ==
The unicameral Parliament of Sweden has 349 members: 310 are elected using party-list proportional representation, and 39 using "adjustment seats".

=== Riksdag election results in percent of the vote 1911–2022 ===
The first elections to a unicameral Riksdag were held in 1970. The older figures refer to elections of the Andra kammaren under the older bicameral system.

Note that, as of 16 September 2026, the 2026 results are still preliminary; official results will be announced about two weeks after the election.

Year	V	S	MP	L	C	M	KD	SD	Various	Others	Turnout
2026	8.25	28.06	6.11	5.37	7.06	19.8	6.2	17.5		1.56	80.3%
2022	6.8	30.3	5.1	4.6	6.7	19.1	5.3	20.5		1.5	84.2%
2018	8.0	28.3	4.4	5.5	8.6	19.8	6.3	17.5		1.6	87.2%
2014	5.7	31.0	6.9	5.4	6.1	23.3	4.6	12.9	3.1 (Fi)	1.4	85.8%
2010	5.6	30.7	7.3	7.1	6.6	30.1	5.6	5.7		1.4	84.6%
2006	5.9	35.0	5.2	7.5	7.9	26.2	6.6	2.9		2.7	82.0%
2002	8.4	39.9	4.7	13.4	6.2	15.3	9.1	1.4		1.4	80.1%
1998	12.0	36.4	4.5	4.7	5.1	22.9	11.8	0.4		2.2	81.4%
1994	6.2	45.3	5.0	7.2	7.7	22.4	4.1		1.2 (NyD)	1.0	86.4%
1991	4.5	37.6	3.4	9.1	8.5	21.9	7.1		6.7 (NyD)	1.2	86.7%
1988	5.8	43.2	5.5	12.2	11.3	18.3	2.9			0.7	86.0%
1985	5.4	44.7	1.5	14.2	10.1	21.3	2.3			0.5	89.9%
1982	5.6	45.6	1.7	5.9	15.5	23.6	1.9			0.2	91.4%
1979	5.6	43.2		10.6	18.1	20.3	1.4			0.8	90.7%
1976	4.8	42.7		11.1	24.1	15.6	1.4			0.4	91.8%
1973	5.3	43.6		9.4	25.1	14.3	1.8			0.6	90.8%
1970	4.8	45.3		16.2	19.9	11.5	1.8			0.4	88.3%
Andra kammaren
1968	3.0	50.1		14.3	15.7	12.9	1.5			2.6	89.3%
1964	5.2	47.3		17.0	13.2	13.7	1.8			1.8	83.3%
1960	4.5	47.8		17.5	13.6	16.5				0.1	85.9%
1958	3.4	46.2		18.2	12.7	19.5				0.0	77.4%
1956	5.0	44.6		23.8	9.4	17.1				0.1	79.8%
1952	4.3	46.1		24.4	10.7	14.4				0.1	79.1%
1948	6.3	46.1		22.8	12.4	12.3			(SP)	0.1	82.7%
1944	10.3	46.7		12.9	13.6	15.9			0.2	0.4	71.9%
1940	3.5	53.8		12.0	12.0	18.0			0.7	0.0	70.3%
1936	3.3	45.9		12.9	14.3	17.6			4.4	1.6	74.5%
1932	3.0	41.7		11.7	14.1	23.5			5.3	0.7	68.6%
1928	6.4	37.0		15.9	11.2	29.4				0.1	67.4%
1924	5.1	41.1		16.9	10.8	26.1			(SSV)	0.0	53.0%
1921	4.6	36.2		19.1	11.1	25.8			3.2	0.0	54.2%
1920	6.4	29.7		21.8	14.2	27.9				0.0	55.3%
1917	8.1	31.1		27.6	8.5	24.7				0.0	65.8%
1914 (Sept.)		36.4		26.9	0.2	36.5				0.0	66.2%
1914 (Mar.)		30.1		32.2		37.7				0.0	69.9%
1911		28.5		40.2		31.2				0.1	57.0%

=== 2022 election ===
General elections were held in Sweden on 11 September 2022 to elect the 349 members of the Riksdag who in turn elected the Prime Minister of Sweden. Under the constitution, regional and municipal elections were also held on the same day. The preliminary results presented on 15 September showed the government parties lost their majority, which were confirmed by the final results published on 17 September. After a month of negotiations following the elections that led to the Tidö Agreement among the right-wing bloc, Moderate Party (M) leader Ulf Kristersson was elected prime minister on 17 October. The Kristersson cabinet is a minority government of the Moderates, Christian Democrats (KD) and Liberals (L) that relies on confidence and supply from the Sweden Democrats (SD).

The campaign period was met with issues regarding Sweden's accession to NATO due to the 2022 Russian invasion of Ukraine, as well as crime, energy, the economy, and immigration. Parliamentary parties campaigned through July and August, while in late August SD surpassed M in opinion polls. Exit polls showed that S and its confidence-and-supply parties Left Party, Centre Party and Green Party had a narrow lead against the right-leaning bloc (SD, M, KD, L). During the counting of the preliminary results and later on, Sweden's Election Authority said that the right overtook the left (S, V, C, MP) by three seats. Andersson conceded the election three days later, and resigned the day after that.

The election saw massive swings between the two blocs in different regions. The left-leaning bloc won the most votes in large cities and several university towns with unprecedented massive margins. Stockholm city went red by 18 points, Gothenburg by 11 points and the left also flipped two suburban municipalities in Stockholm County. Meanwhile, the right managed to overturn dozens of municipalities that had historically been dominated by S, especially in the central interior Bergslagen region. In this historically industrial area, the county of Dalarna was won by the right-leaning coalition for the first time in history, while the left held on by just 373 votes in Värmland. Likewise, some municipalities that the outright leftist parties (S, V, MP) had won with an overall majority of 50 points in the 1994 Swedish general election, flipped to the right. In middle Sweden, the right won Eskilstuna, Gävle, Norrköping, Södertälje and Västerås. All five had been historical leftist strongholds.

Major gains in minority were also made by the right-leaning bloc in Northern Sweden, leading the vote in eight municipalities compared to none four years prior. In the lower east, the historically leftist swing counties Kalmar, Södermanland, Västmanland and Östergötland all went to the right to seal the parliamentary majority. S won 30% of the popular vote, with a net increase in spite of the election loss. SD became the second-largest party with above 20% of the popular vote, surpassing M at 19%. The blocs were separated by a thin margin of about half a percentage point. The parties aligned with the outgoing government did somewhat better in the regional and municipal elections.

=== 2026 election ===
General elections were held in Sweden on 13 September 2026 to elect the 349 members of the Riksdag, alongside municipal and regional elections. The incumbent Ulf Kristersson cabinet was a coalition minority between the Moderate Party (M), the Christian Democrats (KD), and the Liberals (L), with external support from the Sweden Democrats (SD) under the Tidö Agreement. It was the first general election since Sweden joined NATO in 2024 and resulted in the left-leaning opposition winning a narrow parliamentary majority.

The main parties contested the election within two broad political blocs. The governing Tidö parties consisted of M, KD, L, and SD, while the opposition was led by the Social Democrats (S) under Magdalena Andersson, together with the Left Party (V), Centre Party (C), and Green Party (MP). The campaign focused heavily on immigration and integration, crime and law and order, the economy, healthcare, education, climate change, and energy policy. SD sought a formal role in government after supporting the Tidö government from outside the cabinet during the previous parliamentary term, making its potential entry into government one of the central issues of the campaign.

Opinion polls gave the red-green opposition a clear advantage throughout the campaign. As the election came closer, the opposition's lead narrowed in the opinion polls and the difference between the two blocs started to even out. However, the opposition still generally held an advantage in the final weeks, with several polls placing the four opposition parties above 50% of the vote. Exit polls initially indicated a wider opposition victory than the final result, with the first projections giving the opposition a clearer parliamentary advantage. The election nevertheless remained close until the final votes were counted, with the outcome ultimately determined by a small difference in support between the two blocs. The opposition primarily gained ground in the bigger cities and won unprecedented landslides in the four largest cities. The opposition also reduced deficits in much of the south and the outer county surrounding Stockholm, whereas the Tidö coalition made big gains in central and northern Sweden. This notably resulted in the Tidö coalition winning historically socialist counties Gävleborg and Värmland against the national trend. Many municipalities in former socialist strongholds likewise voted for the right for the first time in a national election, resulting in a very polarised map.

The opposition parties won a narrow parliamentary majority, securing 176 of the Riksdag's 349 seats, compared with 173 for the Tidö parties. Social Democrats remained the largest party with 28.0% of the vote and 99 seats, while Moderates overtook Sweden Democrats to become the second-largest party with 19.9% and 70 seats, as Sweden Democrats fell to third place with 17.5% and 62 seats. The result marked the first decline in support for Sweden Democrats at a general election since 1988, and Social Democrats recorded their lowest vote and seat share since 1911. Following the result, Kristersson announced his resignation as prime minister and Andersson began negotiations with the opposition parties over the formation of a new government.

== County Council elections ==
=== County Council elections results ===
- 2002 Swedish county council elections

== Municipal elections ==
=== Municipal elections results ===
==== Other municipalities ====
- 2002 Stockholm municipal election

== Elections to the European Parliament ==
Members of the European Parliament for Sweden
Delegation	(1995)
4th term	(1995)
5th term	(1999)
6th term	(2004)
7th term	(2009)
8th term	(2014)
9th term	(2019)
10th term	(2024)

The most recent European parliamentary elections in Sweden were held in June 2024.

The Swedish Social Democratic party has won every EU election since 1995, As of 2024.

== See also ==
- Elections to the Church Assembly, 2005
- Electoral calendar
- Electoral system
- Party-list proportional representation
- List of political parties in Sweden
- Swedish Election Authority
- Referendums in Sweden
