= List of members of the European Parliament for Sweden, 1995–1999 =

Members of the European Parliament for Sweden
Delegation	(1995)
4th term	(1995)
5th term	(1999)
6th term	(2004)
7th term	(2009)
8th term	(2014)
9th term	(2019)
10th term	(2024)

This is a list of the 22 members of the European Parliament for Sweden in the 1994 to 1999 session.

== List ==
Name	National party	EP Group
Birgitta Ahlqvist	Social Democratic Party	PES
Jan Andersson	Social Democratic Party	PES
Gunilla Carlsson	Moderate Party	EPP
Hadar Cars	Liberal People's Party	ELDR
Charlotte Cederschiöld	Moderate Party	EPP
Marianne Eriksson	Left Party	EUL–NGL
Per Gahrton	Green Party	G
Ulf Holm	Green Party	G
Anneli Hulthén	Social Democratic Party	PES
Staffan Burenstam Linder	Moderate Party	EPP
MaLou Lindholm	Green Party	G
Hans Lindqvist	Centre Party	ELDR
Maj-Lis Lööw	Social Democratic Party	PES
Karl Olsson	Centre Party	ELDR
Inger Schörling	Green Party	G
Jonas Sjöstedt	Left Party	EUL–NGL
Per Stenmarck	Moderate Party	EPP
Jörn Svensson	Left Party	EUL–NGL
Maj Britt Theorin	Social Democratic Party	PES
Ivar Virgin	Moderate Party	EPP
Tommy Waidelich	Social Democratic Party	PES
Sören Wibe	Social Democratic Party	PES
