= List of members of the European Parliament for Sweden, 1999–2004 =

Members of the European Parliament for Sweden
Delegation	(1995)
4th term	(1995)
5th term	(1999)
6th term	(2004)
7th term	(2009)
8th term	(2014)
9th term	(2019)
10th term	(2024)

This is a list of the 22 members of the European Parliament for Sweden in the 1999 to 2004 session.

== List ==
Name	National party	EP group
Jan Andersson	Social Democratic Party	PES
Per-Arne Arvidsson	Moderate Party	EPP–ED
Gunilla Carlsson	Moderate Party	EPP–ED
Charlotte Cederschiöld	Moderate Party	EPP–ED
Marianne Eriksson	Left Party	EUL–NGL
Göran Färm	Social Democratic Party	PES
Per Gahrton	Green Party	G–EFA
Ewa Hedkvist Petersen	Social Democratic Party	PES
Anneli Hulthén	Social Democratic Party	PES
Staffan Burenstam Linder	Moderate Party	EPP–ED
Cecilia Malmström	Liberal People's Party	ELDR
Karl Erik Olsson	Centre Party	ELDR
Marit Paulsen	Liberal People's Party	ELDR
Lennart Sacrédeus	Christian Democrats	EPP–ED
Herman Schmid	Left Party	EUL–NGL
Olle Schmidt	Liberal People's Party	ELDR
Pierre Schori	Social Democratic Party	PES
Inger Schörling	Green Party	G–EFA
Jonas Sjöstedt	Left Party	EUL–NGL
Per Stenmarck	Moderate Party	EPP–ED
Maj Britt Theorin	Social Democratic Party	PES
Anders Wijkman	Christian Democrats	EPP–ED
