= List of members of the European Parliament for Sweden, 2004–2009 =

Members of the European Parliament for Sweden
Delegation	(1995)
4th term	(1995)
5th term	(1999)
6th term	(2004)
7th term	(2009)
8th term	(2014)
9th term	(2019)
10th term	(2024)

This is a list of the 19 members of the European Parliament for Sweden in the 2004 to 2009 session.

== List ==
Name	National party	EP Group
Jan Andersson	Social Democratic Party	PES
Maria Carlshamre	Liberal People's Party (until 2 October 2006) Feminist Initiative	ALDE
Charlotte Cederschiöld	Moderate Party	EPP–ED
Lena Ek	Centre Party	ALDE
Christofer Fjellner	Moderate Party	EPP–ED
Hélène Goudin	June List	IND&DEM
Anna Hedh	Social Democratic Party	PES
Ewa Hedkvist Petersen (until 31 January 2007) Göran Färm (from 1 February 2007)	Social Democratic Party	PES
Gunnar Hökmark	Moderate Party	EPP–ED
Anna Ibrisagic	Moderate Party	EPP–ED
Nils Lundgren	June List	IND&DEM
Cecilia Malmström (until 5 October 2006) Olle Schmidt (from 19 October 2006)	Liberal People's Party	ALDE
Carl Schlyter	Green Party	G–EFA
Inger Segelström	Social Democratic Party	PES
Jonas Sjöstedt (until 26 September 2006) Jens Holm (from 27 September 2006)	Left Party	EUL–NGL
Eva-Britt Svensson	Left Party	EUL–NGL
Åsa Westlund	Social Democratic Party	PES
Anders Wijkman	Christian Democrats	EPP–ED
Lars Wohlin	June List (until 27 September 2006) Christian Democrats	IND&DEM (until 25 September 2006) EPP–ED
