= List of members of the European Parliament for Sweden, 2014–2019 =

Members of the European Parliament for Sweden
Delegation	(1995)
4th term	(1995)
5th term	(1999)
6th term	(2004)
7th term	(2009)
8th term	(2014)
9th term	(2019)
10th term	(2024)

This is a list of the 20 members of the European Parliament for Sweden in the 2014 to 2019 session.

== List ==
Name	National party	EP Group	Preference votes
Jytte Guteland	Social Democratic Party	S&D	38,970
Anna Hedh	Social Democratic Party	S&D	16,664
Olle Ludvigsson	Social Democratic Party	S&D	38,705
Jens Nilsson	Social Democratic Party	S&D	19,887
Marita Ulvskog	Social Democratic Party	S&D	176,721
Soraya Post	Feminist Initiative	S&D	76,211
Max Andersson	Green Party	G–EFA	6,822
Bodil Ceballos	Green Party	G–EFA	8,961
Peter Eriksson	Green Party	G–EFA	58,623
Isabella Lövin	Green Party	G–EFA	133,765
Anna Maria Corazza Bildt	Moderate Party	EPP	83,068
Christofer Fjellner	Moderate Party	EPP	39,816
Gunnar Hökmark	Moderate Party	EPP	61,285
Lars Adaktusson	Christian Democrats	EPP	107,897
Marit Paulsen	Liberal People's Party	ALDE	144,364
Cecilia Wikström	Liberal People's Party	ALDE	41,328
Fredrick Federley	Centre Party	ALDE	32,844
Peter Lundgren	Sweden Democrats	EFDD	27,628
Kristina Winberg	Sweden Democrats	EFDD	43,643
Malin Björk	Left Party	EUL–NGL	39,942

== Midterm replacements ==
- Isabella Lövin resigned on 3 October 2014 when she was appointed Minister for International Development Cooperation in the Swedish Government. She was replaced by Linnéa Engström.
- Marit Paulsen resigned on 29 September 2015 due health problems. She was replaced by Jasenko Selimovic.
- Peter Eriksson resigned on 25 May 2016 when he was appointed Minister for Housing and Digitalization in the Swedish Government. He was replaced by Jakop Dalunde.
- Jens Nilsson died on 13 March 2018. He was replaced by Aleksander Gabelic.
- Lars Adaktusson resigned on 23 September 2018 when he was elected Member of the Riksdag in the 2018 general election. He was replaced by Anders Sellström.
