= List of members of the European Parliament for Sweden, 2009–2014 =

Members of the European Parliament for Sweden
Delegation	(1995)
4th term	(1995)
5th term	(1999)
6th term	(2004)
7th term	(2009)
8th term	(2014)
9th term	(2019)
10th term	(2024)

This is a list of the 18 members of the European Parliament for Sweden in the 2009 to 2014 session. One person from Pirate Party and one from Social Democratic Party entered the Parliament in December 2011, bringing the number of MEPs to 20.

== List ==
Name	National party	EP Group	Votes
Amelia Andersdotter	Pirate Party	G–EFA	22,303
Anna Maria Corazza	Moderate Party	EPP	85,405
Lena Ek	Centre Party	ALDE	57,836
Christian Engström	Pirate Party	G–EFA	43,808
Christofer Fjellner	Moderate Party	EPP	40,142
Göran Färm	Social Democratic Party	S&D	20,078
Anna Hedh	Social Democratic Party	S&D	20,716
Gunnar Hökmark	Moderate Party	EPP	90,505
Amna Ibrišagić	Moderate Party	EPP	23,598
Olle Ludvigsson	Social Democratic Party	S&D	53,182
Isabella Lövin	Green Party	G–EFA	48,061
Jens Nilsson	Social Democratic Party	S&D	17,156
Marit Paulsen	Liberal People's Party	ALDE	221,489
Carl Schlyter	Green Party	G–EFA	89,347
Olle Schmidt	Liberal People's Party	ALDE	11,708
Alf Svensson	Christian Democrats	EPP	54,082
Eva-Britt Svensson	Left Party	EUL–NGL	39,145
Marita Ulvskog	Social Democratic Party	S&D	173,894
Åsa Westlund	Social Democratic Party	S&D	40,432
Cecilia Wikström	Liberal People's Party	ALDE	17,746
