= List of members of the European Parliament for Sweden, 2024–2029 =

Members of the European Parliament for Sweden
Delegation	(1995)
4th term	(1995)
5th term	(1999)
6th term	(2004)
7th term	(2009)
8th term	(2014)
9th term	(2019)
10th term	(2024)

This is a list of the 21 members of the European Parliament for Sweden in the 2024 to 2029 session.

== List ==
Name	National party	EP Group	Preference votes
Tomas Tobé	Moderate Party	EPP	173,223
Jessica Polfjärd	Moderate Party	EPP	16,160
Jörgen Warborn	Moderate Party	EPP	12,072
Arba Kokalari	Moderate Party	EPP	6,750
Alice Teodorescu Måwe	Christian Democrats	EPP	91,999
Heléne Fritzon	Social Democratic Party	S&D	112,778
Johan Danielsson	Social Democratic Party	S&D	50,972
Sofie Eriksson	Social Democratic Party	S&D	20,780
Evin Incir	Social Democratic Party	S&D	15,438
Adnan Dibrani	Social Democratic Party	S&D	15,082
Charlie Weimers	Sweden Democrats	ECR	143,315
Dick Erixon	Sweden Democrats	ECR	16,374
Beatrice Timgren	Sweden Democrats	ECR	11,751
Emma Wiesner	Centre Party	RE	72,995
Abir Al-Sahlani	Centre Party	RE	10,659
Karin Karlsbro	Liberals	RE	28,145
Alice Bah Kuhnke	Green Party	Greens/EFA	220,162
Pär Holmgren	Green Party	Greens/EFA	42,559
Isabella Lövin	Green Party	Greens/EFA	41,737
Jonas Sjöstedt	Left Party	GUE/NGL	260,093
Hanna Gedin	Left Party	GUE/NGL	10,098
