= List of members of the European Parliament for Sweden, 1995 =

Members of the European Parliament for Sweden
Delegation	(1995)
4th term	(1995)
5th term	(1999)
6th term	(2004)
7th term	(2009)
8th term	(2014)
9th term	(2019)
10th term	(2024)

This is a list of the 22 appointed members in the European Parliament for Sweden in the 1995 session (from 1 January 1995 until 16 September 1995), ordered by name. They were appointed by the Riksdag, not elected. The first Swedish MEP elections were held on 17 September 1995, with the first elected MEPs taking their seats 9 October 1995.

== List ==
Name	National party	EP Group
Margaretha af Ugglas	Moderate Party	EPP
Birgitta Ahlqvist	Social Democratic Party	PES
Axel Andersson	Social Democratic Party	PES
Jan Andersson	Social Democratic Party	PES
Hadar Cars	Liberal People's Party	ELDR
Charlotte Cederschiöld	Moderate Party	EPP
Karin Falkmer	Moderate Party	EPP
Reynoldh Furustrand	Social Democratic Party	PES
Per Gahrton	Green Party	GG
Holger Gustafsson	Christian Democrats	EPP
Bengt Hurtig	Left Party	EUL–NGL
Inga-Britt Johansson	Social Democratic Party	PES
Maj-Lis Lööw	Social Democratic Party	PES
Karl Olsson	Centre Party	ELDR
Kristina Persson	Social Democratic Party	PES
Bengt-Ola Ryttar	Social Democratic Party	PES
Yvonne Sandberg-Fries	Social Democratic Party	PES
Karin Starrin	Centre Party	ELDR
Per Stenmarck	Moderate Party	EPP
Maj Britt Theorin	Social Democratic Party	PES
Ivar Virgin	Moderate Party	EPP
Tommy Waidelich	Social Democratic Party	PES
