= List of members of the European Parliament for Sweden, 2019–2024 =

Members of the European Parliament for Sweden
Delegation	(1995)
4th term	(1995)
5th term	(1999)
6th term	(2004)
7th term	(2009)
8th term	(2014)
9th term	(2019)
10th term	(2024)

This is a list of the 21 members of the European Parliament for Sweden in the 2019 to 2024 session.

== List ==
Name	National party	EP Group	Preference votes
Tomas Tobé	Moderate Party	EPP	150,726
Jessica Polfjärd	Moderate Party	EPP	17,945
Jörgen Warborn	Moderate Party	EPP	13,503
Arba Kokalari	Moderate Party	EPP	10,284
Sara Skyttedal	Folklistan	EPP	74,325
David Lega	Christian Democrats	EPP	27,862
Heléne Fritzon	Social Democratic Party	S&D	73,929
Jytte Guteland (until 2022)	Social Democratic Party	S&D	42,617
Johan Danielsson (until 2021)	Social Democratic Party	S&D	40,136
Erik Bergkvist (until 2024)	Social Democratic Party	S&D	17,117
Evin Incir	Social Democratic Party	S&D	9,479
Carina Ohlsson (since 2022)	Social Democratic Party	S&D	7,653
Ilan de Basso (since 2021)	Social Democratic Party	S&D	6,970
Linus Glanzelius (since 2024)	Social Democratic Party	S&D	4,994
Peter Lundgren	Independent	ECR	87,384
Jessica Stegrud (until 2022)	Sweden Democrats	ECR	41,202
Charlie Weimers	Sweden Democrats	ECR	30,668
Johan Nissinen (since 2022)	Sweden Democrats	ECR	3,981
Fredrick Federley (until 2020)	Centre Party	RE	108,240
Emma Wiesner (since 2021)	Centre Party	RE	20,683
Abir Al-Sahlani	Centre Party	RE	6,352
Karin Karlsbro	Liberals	RE	15,826
Alice Bah Kuhnke	Green Party	Greens/EFA	141,106
Pär Holmgren	Green Party	Greens/EFA	73,120
Jakop Dalunde (since 2020)	Green Party	Greens/EFA	12,098
Malin Björk	Left Party	GUE/NGL	63,264
