= MaLou Lindholm =

Swedish politician

Marie-Louise "MaLou" Lindholm (born 18 October 1948) is a Swedish politician born in Stockholm who served as a Green Party member of the European Parliament from 9 October 1995 to 19 July 1999.

In 2003, she was awarded the Swedish Carnegie Institute's journalist prize, together with Torgny Peterson, for "the unveiling of the Mike Trace scandal in the United Nations and for a news service via the Hassela Nordic Network".

In the 2004 European Parliament election in Sweden, she ran as a cross-political candidate.
