= Inger Schörling =

Swedish politician (born 1946)

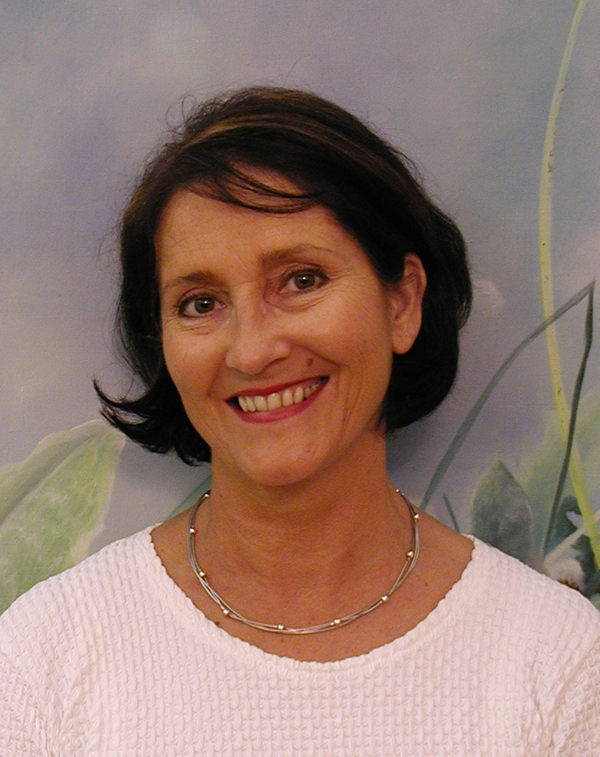
Inger Schörling in 2002

Inger Schörling (born 7 March 1946) is a Swedish politician for the Green Party and former member of the Riksdagen and the European Parliament.

Schörling was born in Kalvträsk. She made it to the Riksdagen after the election of 1988. In 1995, she was elected into the European Parliament where she worked with environmental, health and consumer questions. Schörling left the parliament in 2004 because of the parties rules of how long one person can stay in the European parliament.
