= Marianne Eriksson =

Swedish MEP from 1995-2004

Member of the European Parliament
- In office 1995–2004
- Constituency: Sweden

Personal details
- Born: 17 May 1952 (age 73) Brännkyrka, Sweden
- Party: Left Party (until 2016)

Jane Marianne Eriksson (born 17 May 1952 in Brännkyrka) is a Swedish politician and former MEP for the Left Party. She sat in the European Parliament for two terms from 1995 until 2004. In the 1999–2004 term she was vice chair of the Committee on Women's Rights and Gender Equality. She left the Left Party in 2016 following conflict with the party leadership.
