= Olle Ludvigsson =

Swedish politician

Olle Ludvigsson MEP
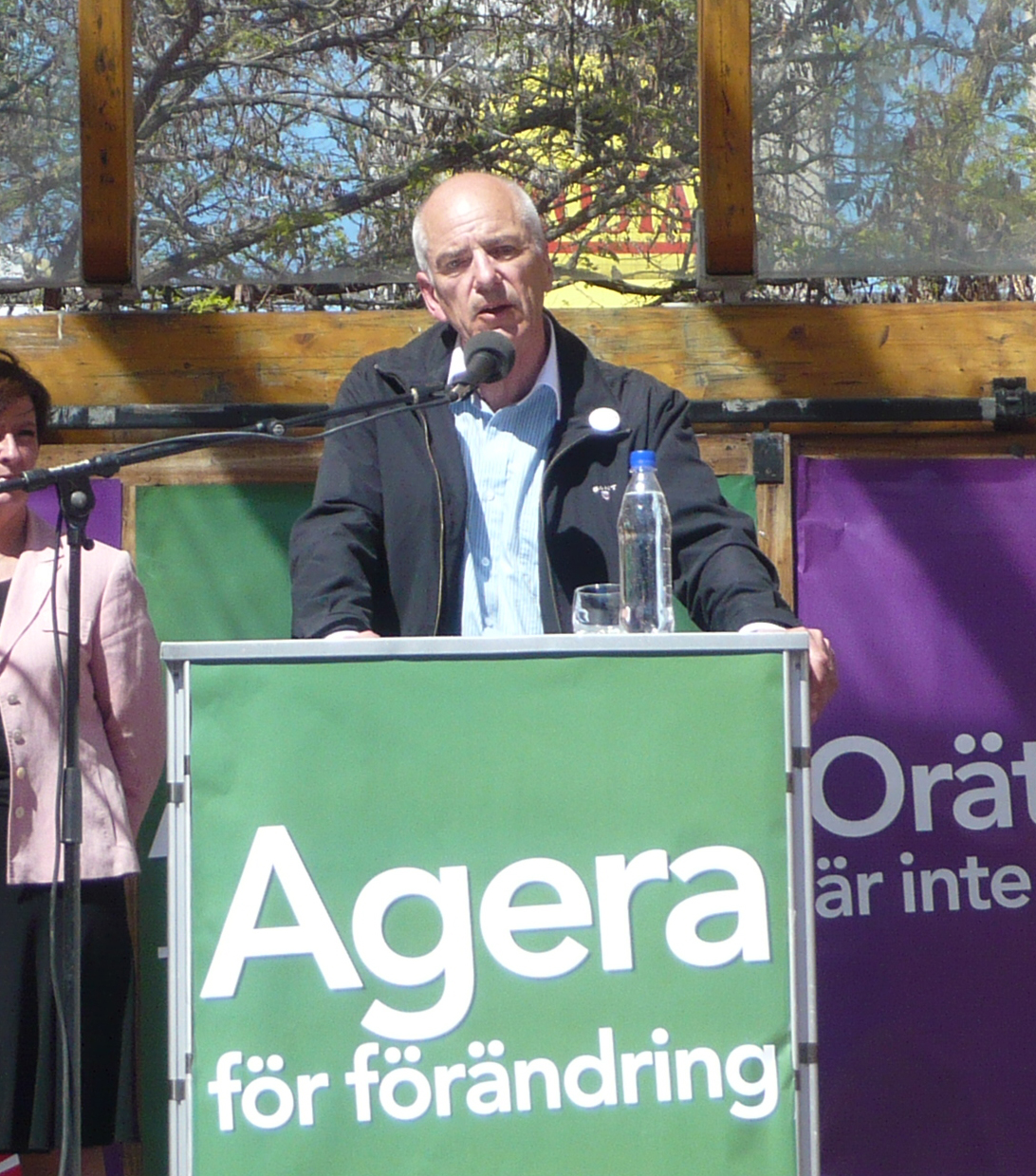

Member of the European Parliament
- In office 2009–2019
- Constituency: Sweden

Personal details
- Born: 26 April 1948 (age 78) Uppsala, Sweden
- Party: Swedish; Social Democratic Party; EU; Party of European Socialists
- Education: Vienna University

Olle Ludvigsson (born 26 April 1948) is a Swedish politician who served as a Member of the European Parliament (MEP) from 2009 until 2019. He is a member of the Swedish Social Democratic Party, part of the Party of European Socialists.

In addition to his committee assignments, Ludvigsson served as a member of the European Parliament Intergroup on Western Sahara.
