= Jonas Sjöstedt =

Swedish politician (born 1964)

Jonas Sjöstedt V
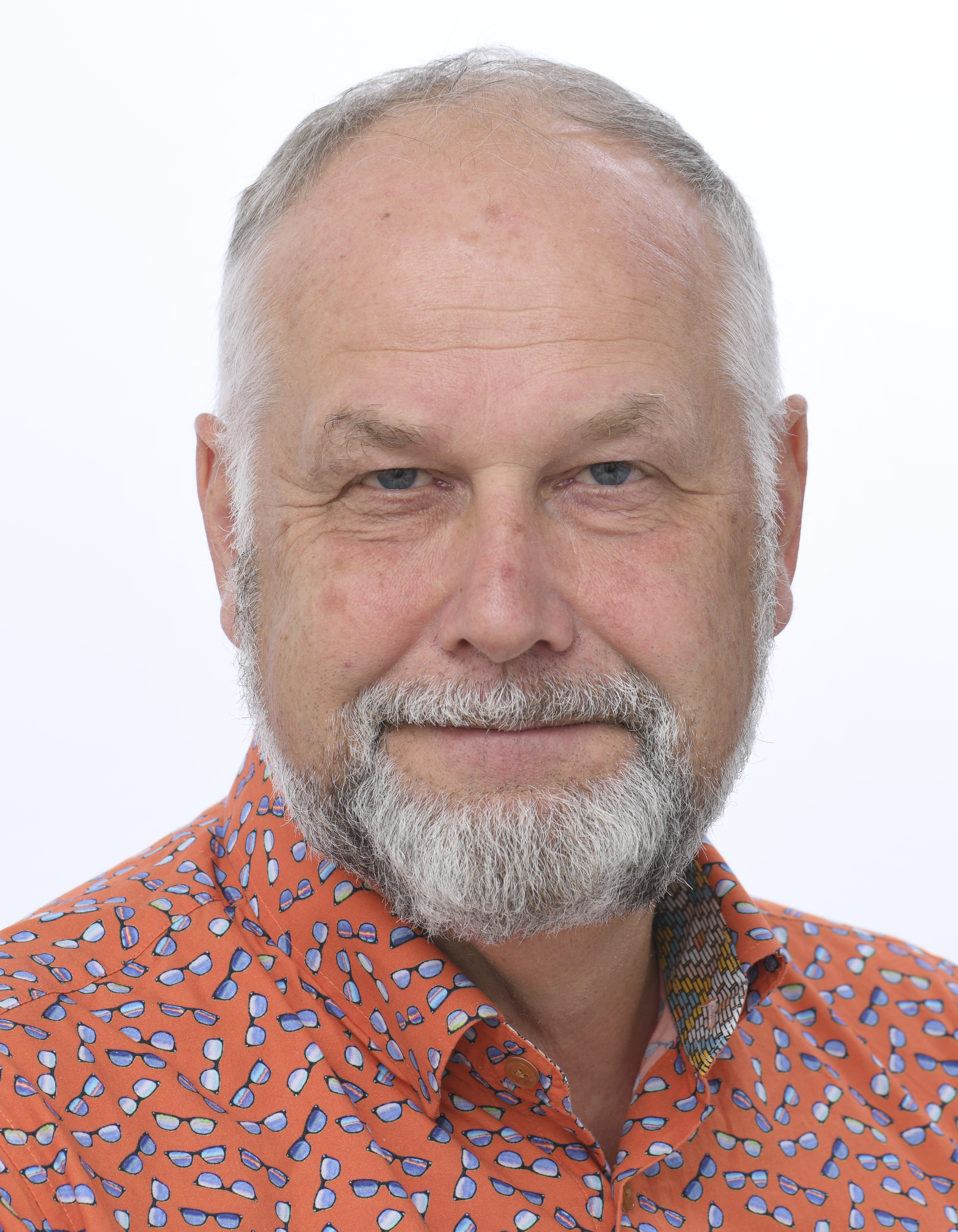
- Official portrait, 2024

Member of the European Parliament
- Incumbent
- Assumed office 16 July 2024
- Constituency: Sweden
- In office 9 October 1995 – 26 September 2006
- Constituency: Sweden

Leader of the Left Party
- In office 6 January 2012 – 31 October 2020
- Preceded by: Lars Ohly
- Succeeded by: Nooshi Dadgostar

Member of the Riksdag
- In office 4 October 2010 – 3 November 2020
- Succeeded by: Gudrun Nordborg
- Constituency: Västerbotten County

Personal details
- Born: 25 December 1964 (age 61) Gothenburg, Sweden
- Party: Left
- Other political affiliations: Socialist Party USA
- Spouse: Ann Måwe (m. 2004)
- Children: 2
- Profession: Metalworker

Sjöstedt introducing himself at the Gothenburg book fair 2012

Tor Jonas Sjöstedt (born 25 December 1964) is a Swedish politician who has been a Member of the European Parliament for the Left Party since 2024. He served as the leader of the Left Party from 2012 to 2020, was a member of the Swedish parliament, the Riksdag, from 2010 to 2020, and was a member of the European Parliament from 1995 to 2006.

== Early life and education ==
Tor Jonas Sjöstedt was born on 25 December 1964 in Gothenburg. His father worked as an engineer at hydroelectric power stations as well as a teacher, while his mother was a psychotherapist. He has one older sister and one younger brother. Due to his father's occupation, his family moved often; from Sundsvall to Västerås, before settling in Vänersborg.

Due to his dyslexia, Sjöstedt could not read until he was nine years old and found schooling difficult. He dropped out twice before moving to Luleå to complete a two-year social studies course at Hermelinsskolan. During this time, he participated in the Sveriges Elevkårer, which was then known as the Student Organisation, becoming its vice chairman.

Sjöstedt worked odd jobs after graduating before moving to Umeå after the birth of his daughter, where he worked at the local Volvo plant's assembly line.

== Political career ==
=== Early political activities ===
He became politically active at an early age and was an opponent of the Vietnam War. He recalled feeling a sense of euphoria upon learning of the fall of Saigon at the age of 10.

He joined the Left Party's youth association in Vänersborg at the age of 13, and was the co-editor of the association's newspaper, Röd Press, in the 1980s.

=== Member of the European parliament (1995–2006) ===
Sjöstedt was opposed to Swedish membership in European Union, but when the "No" side lost the 1994 referendum, he participated in the 1995 European Parliament election in Sweden for the Left Party as part of the European United Left-Nordic Green Left group and was elected. He was re-elected in the 1999 and 2004 European parliament elections and served on the committee on the environment, public health, and consumer policy from 1999 until his resignation from the European parliament in 2006. He supported the "No" side in the 2003 Swedish euro referendum.

=== New York ===
He stepped back from politics in Sweden after he found himself on the losing side of an ideological battle within the Left Party in the aftermath of Gudrun Schyman's resignation, having been unsuccessful in moving the party away from its "old revolutionary traditions". He moved to New York City in 2006 and became a member of the Socialist Party USA.

=== Member of the Riksdag ===
Upon his return to Sweden, he was elected as a member of the Riksdag representing Västerbotten County. In the election, he was the number one candidate on the Left Party's electoral list in the constituency, which generally returns at least one representative. He received one third of all preference votes from Left Party voters, the most of any Left Party candidate in the constituency.

=== Leader of the Left Party (2012–2020) ===
Increasingly popular among Left Party members, Sjöstedt announced his intention to stand for the leadership of the Left Party in July 2011. During the campaign, he advocated for a co-leadership system, arguing that a woman needed to be the head of a feminist party. He was nominated by the party's election committee on 10 December 2011 He was challenged by Ulla Andersson, Hans Linde and Rossana Dinamarca.

He was elected on 6 January 2012 at a party congress, receiving 179 votes to Rossana Dinamarca's 39. In a press conference after his election, he promised Dinamarca a leading role within the party before the 2014 general election. He advocated co-operation with the Swedish Social Democratic Party and the Green Party, but decried the 2010 red-green alliance for necessitating too much compromise on the part of the Left.

In August 2018, he criticised the tightening of Swedish immigration laws and rejected what he called a "competition in Europe to have the harshest policies", advocating the reintroduction of permanent residence permits and family reunification rights.

In January 2020, Sjöstedt announced his intention to resign as the Left Party's leader at their congress in May, citing a desire to spend more time with his family who were currently living in Vietnam. Due to the COVID-19 pandemic, the congress was postponed, and Sjöstedt remained as party leader until the congress could be held on 31 October 2020, when Nooshi Dadgostar was elected as his successor.

=== Activities after party chairmanship ===
He criticised the Swedish government for its concessions to Turkey to secure NATO membership, accusing it of betraying the Kurdish people in Sweden and Turkey.

Sjöstedt was chosen as the lead candidate for the Left Party's list for the 2024 European Parliament election in Sweden and received the most personal votes in a European parliamentary election in Sweden, surpassing Marit Paulsen's record of 221,489 personal votes in 2009. He is one of the party's two MEPs for the 2024–2029 term. He is a member of the Parliament's Committee on Climate and Environment, the Committee on Budgetary Control and a deputy member of the Committee on Foreign Affairs. Sjöstedt is also a columnist in Västerbottens Folkblad.

In 2026, Sjöstedt and fellow MEP Hanna Gedin were barred by the Israeli government from entering the country, citing anti-Israel activities.

== Personal life ==
Sjöstedt married Ann Måwe, a Swedish diplomat, in 2004. They have twins. Jonas also has a daughter from a previous marriage.

He moved to New York City in 2006, accompanying his wife, who was part of the Swedish delegation to the United Nations. During his time there, he was an active member of the Socialist Party USA. He moved to Hanoi in 2020, where his wife works as the Swedish ambassador to Vietnam. He writes for Swedish leftist publications, radio, and print columns, as well as works of history and fiction.

Party political offices
| Preceded by Lars Ohly | Chairman of the Left Party; 2012–2020 | Succeeded by Nooshi Dadgostar |
