= 1999 European Parliament election in Sweden =

- 13 June 1999

22 seats to the European Parliament
- Turnout: 38.84% (▼2.79 pp)
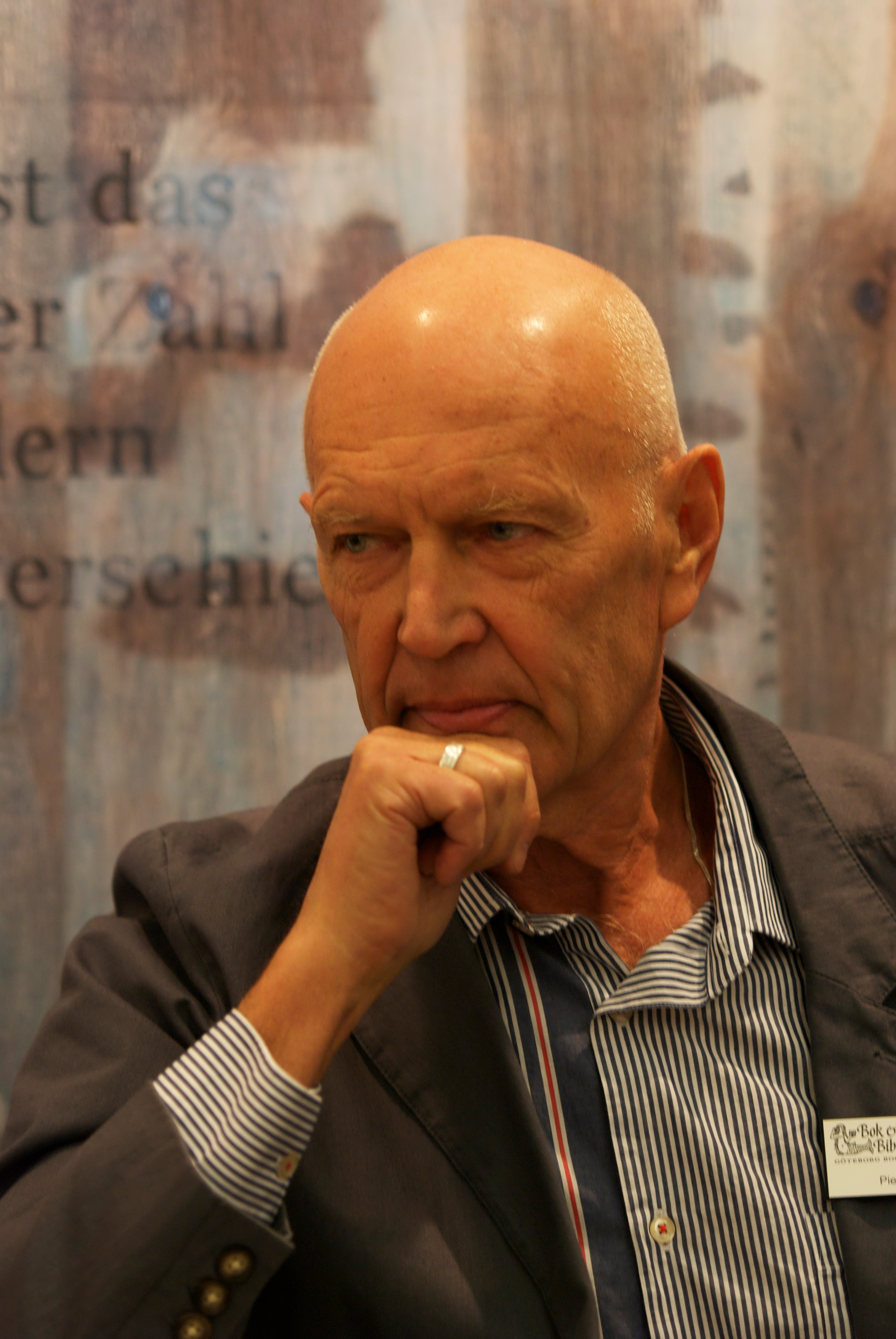

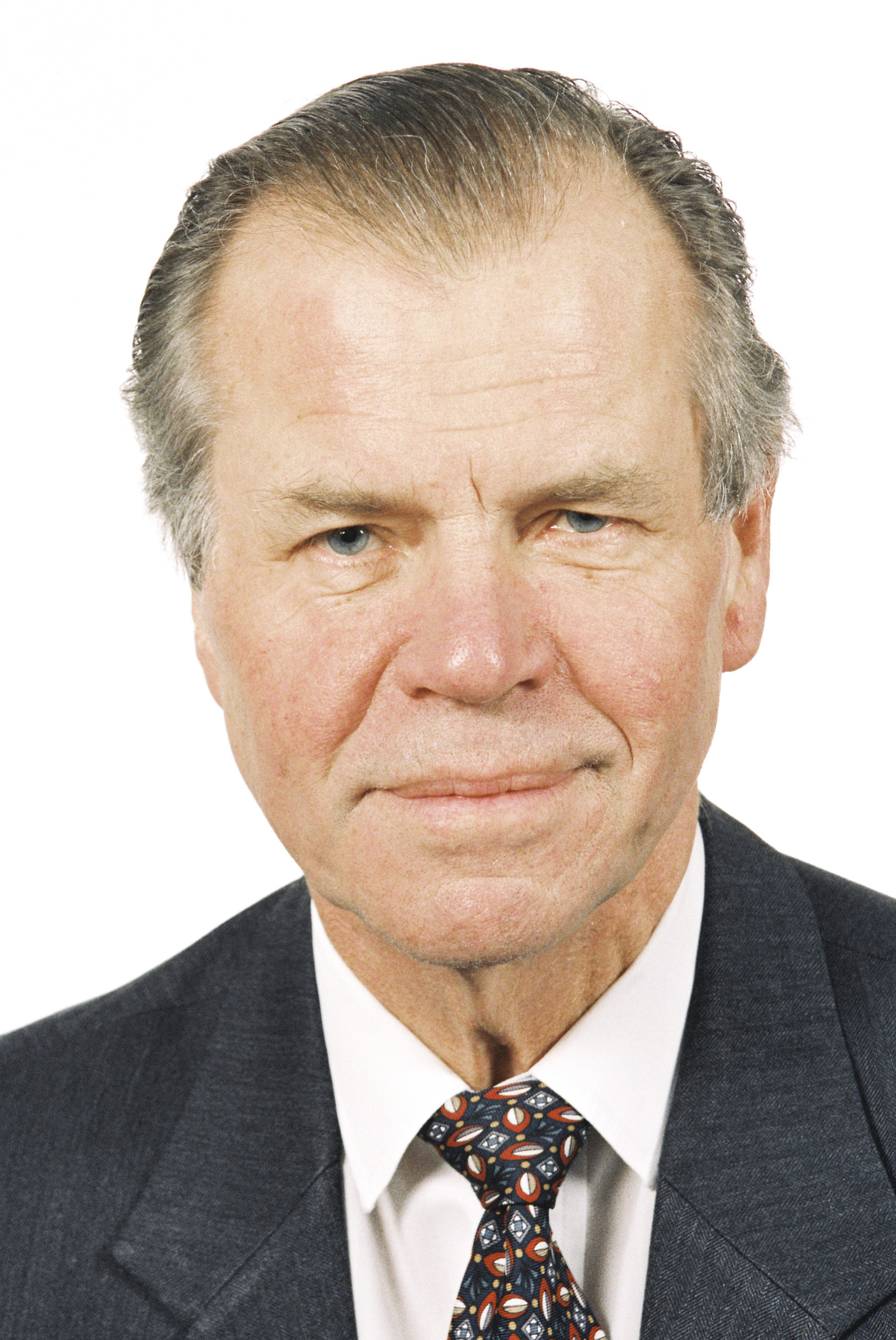

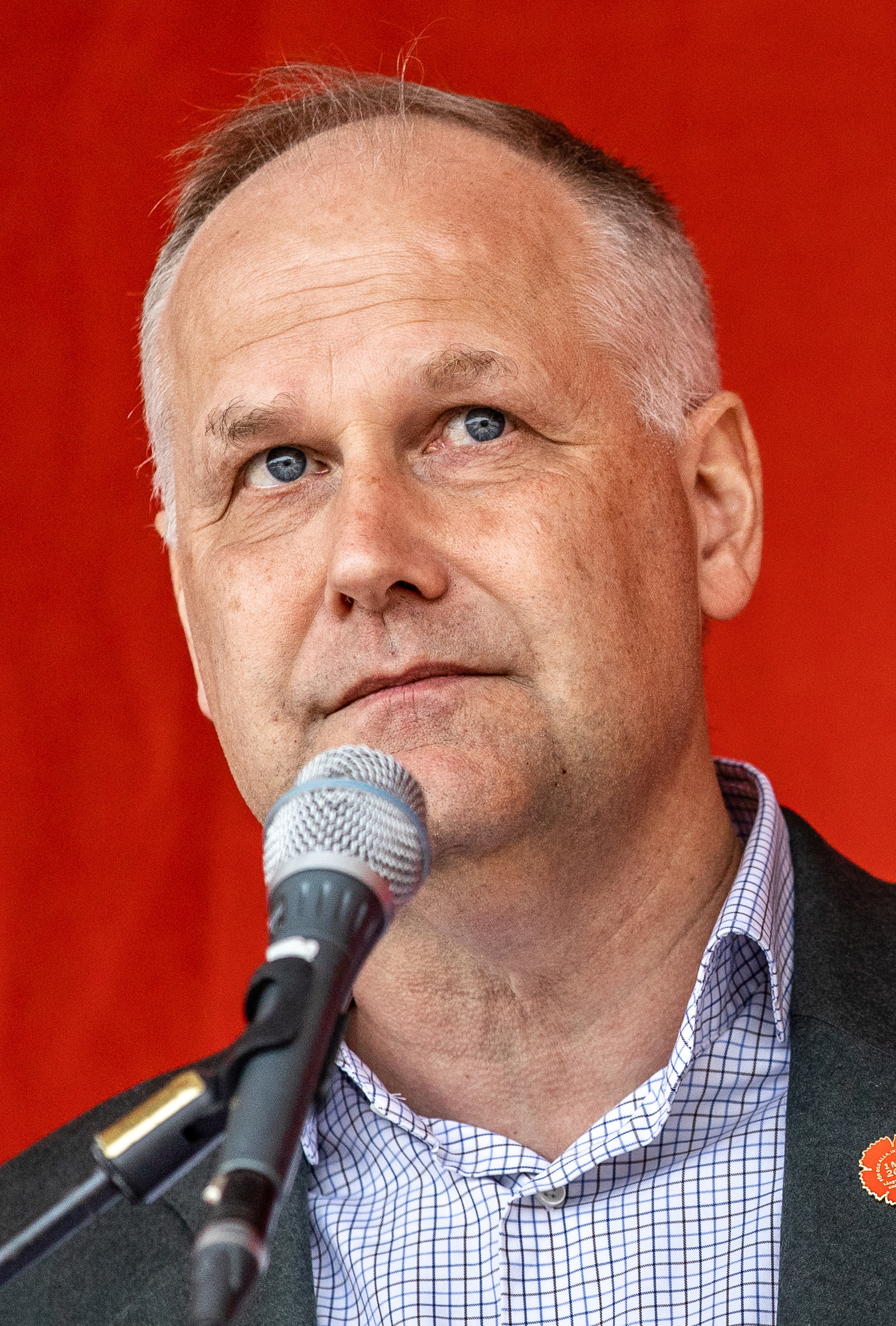

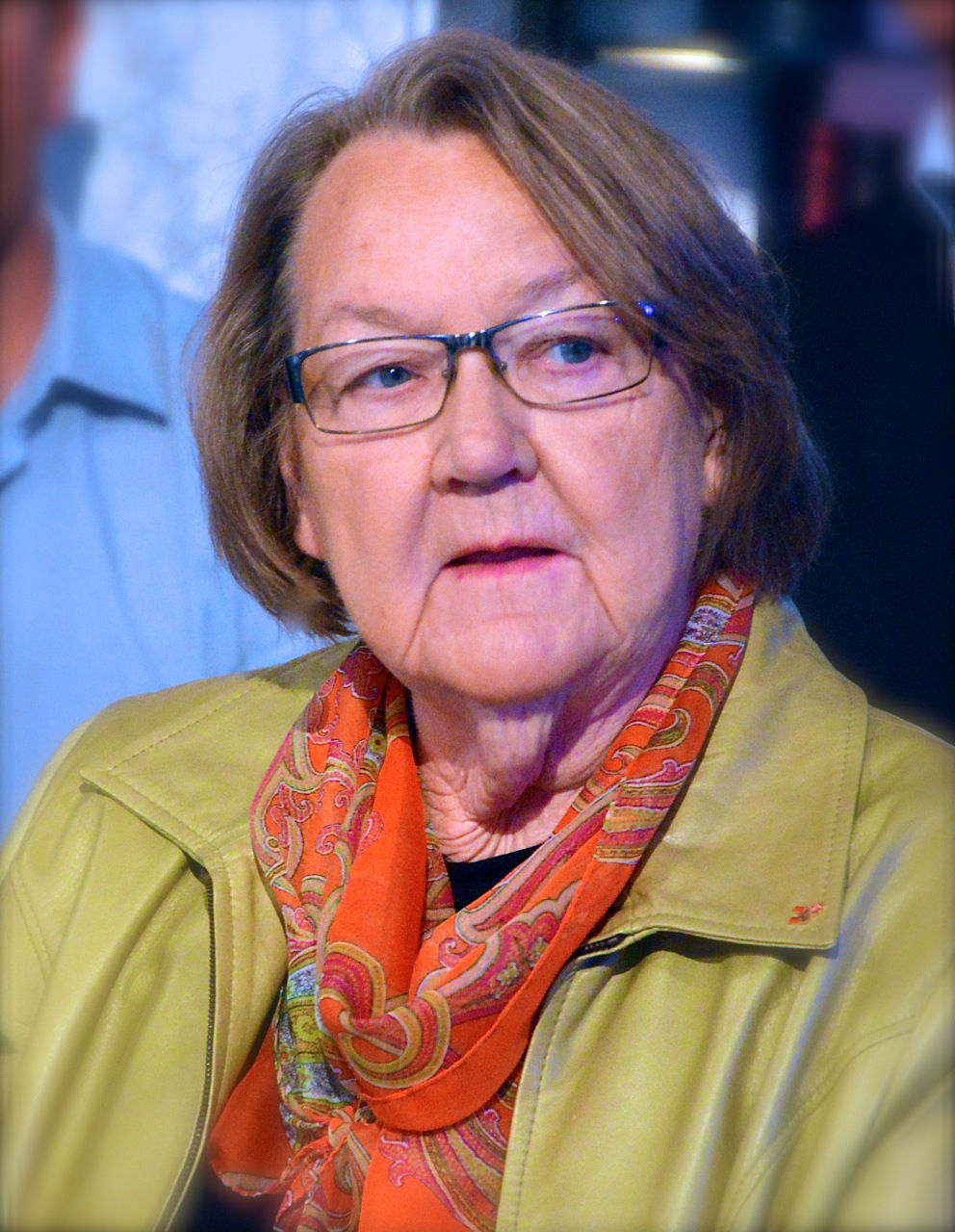

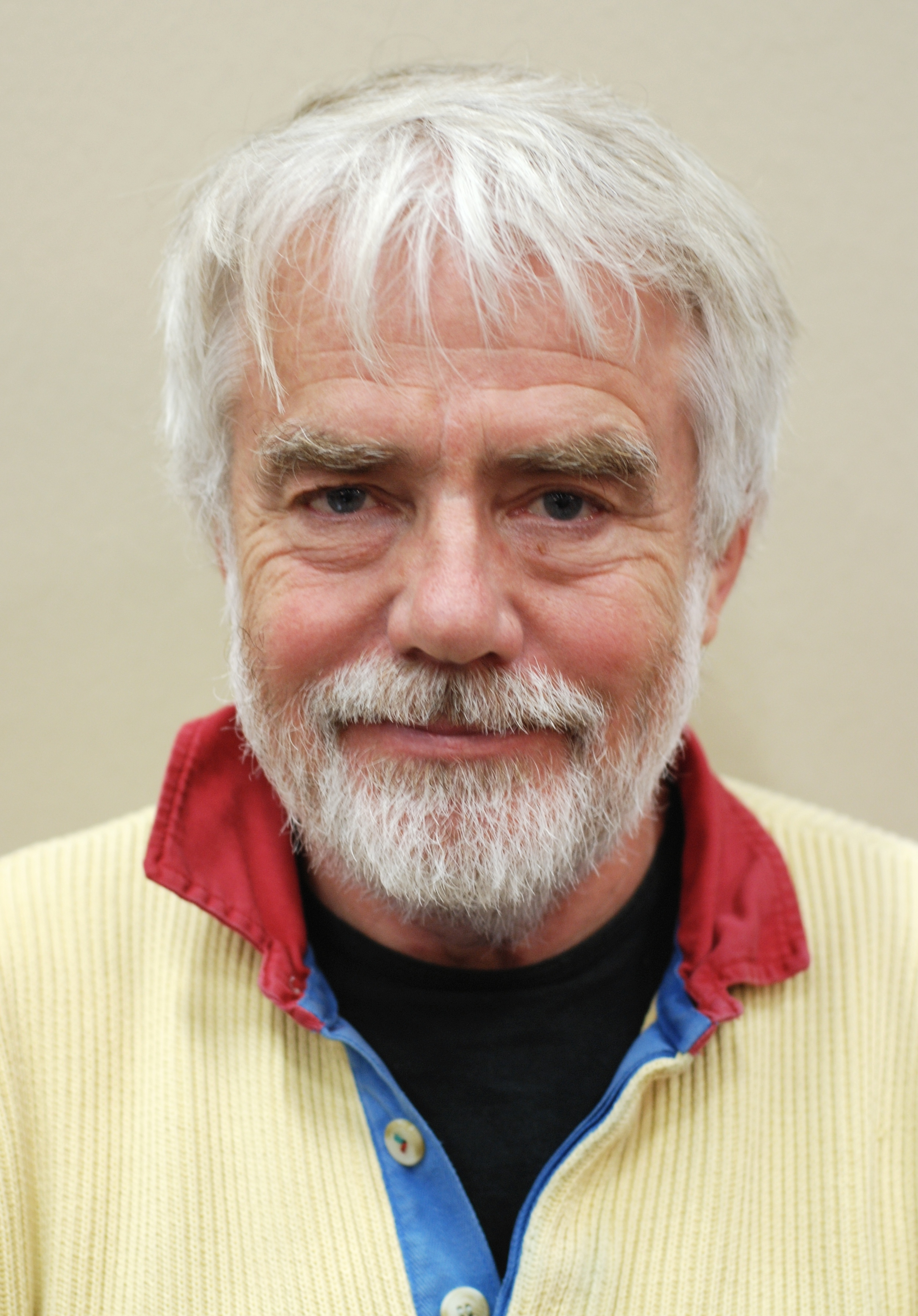

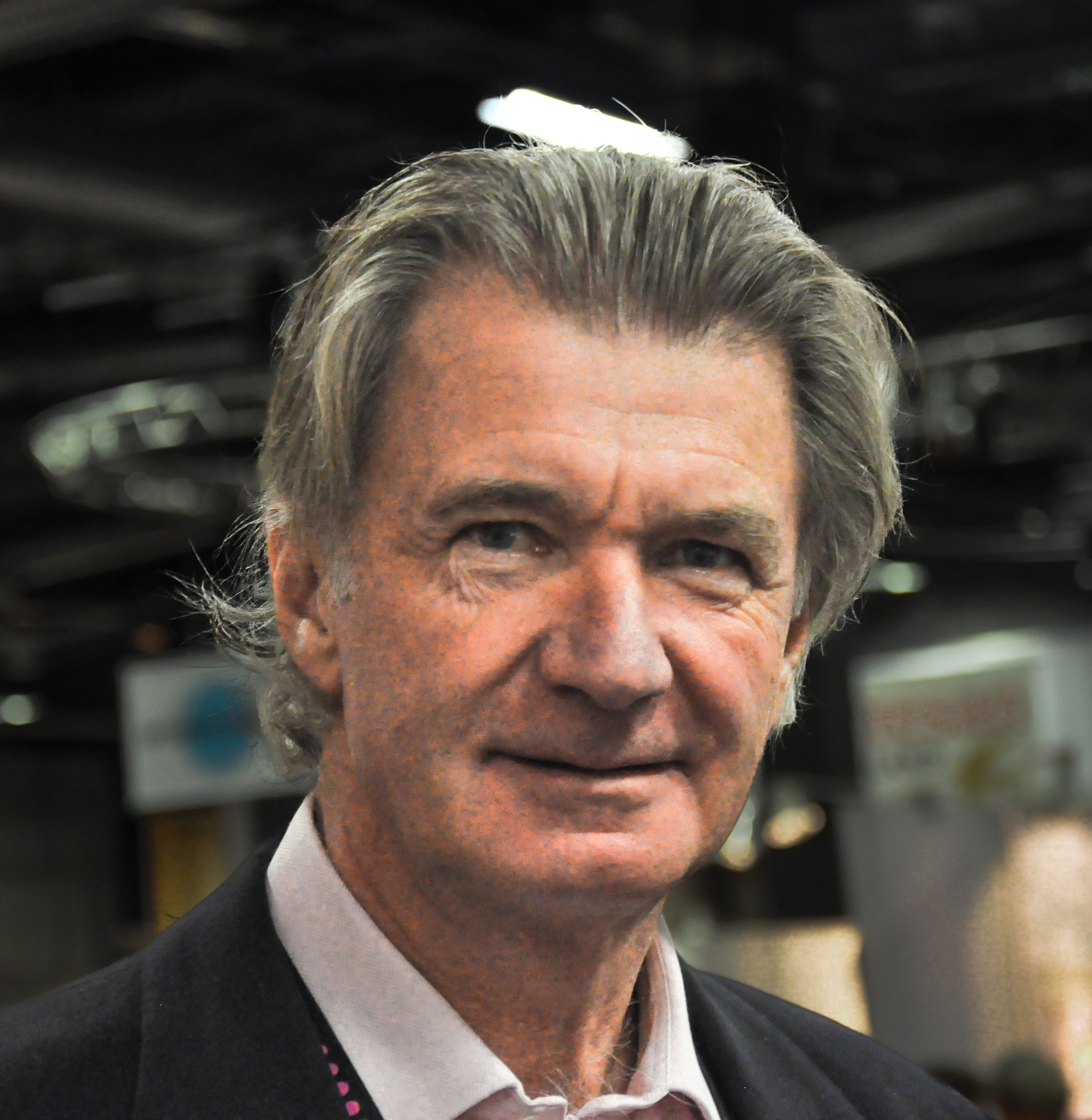

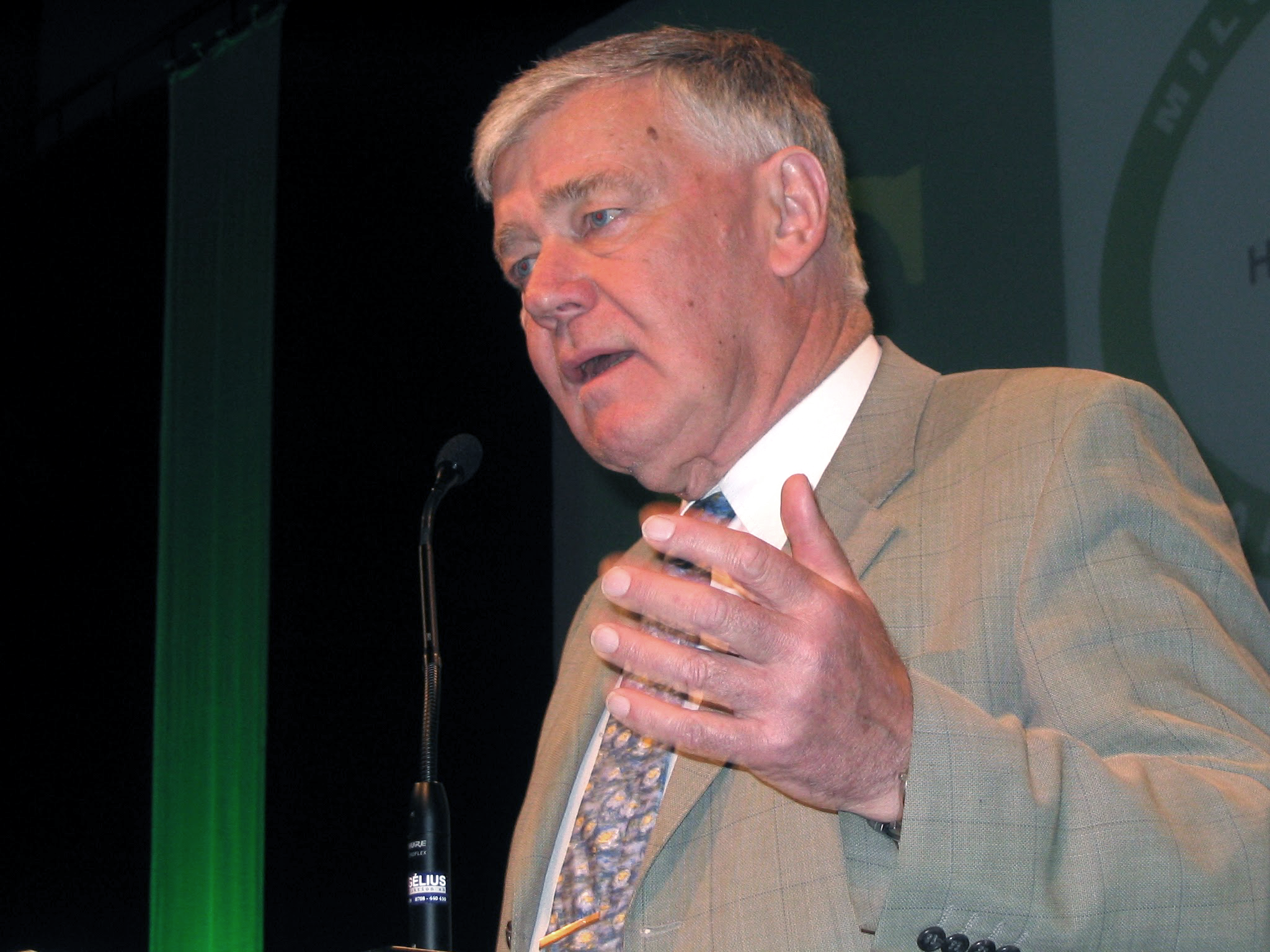
	First party	Second party	Third party
Leader	Pierre Schori	Staffan Burenstam Linder	Jonas Sjöstedt
Party	Social Democrats	Moderate	Left
Alliance	PES	EPP	GUE/NGL
Last election	7 seats, 28.06%	5 seats, 23.17%	3 seats, 12.92%
Seats won	6	5	3
Seat change	▼1	0	0
Popular vote	657,497	524,755	400,073
Percentage	25.99%	20.75%	15.82%
Swing	▼2.07%	▼2.42%	▲2.90%
	Fourth party	Fifth party	Sixth party
Leader	Marit Paulsen	Per Gahrton	Anders Wijkman
Party	Liberals	Green	Christian Democrats
Alliance	ALDE	Greens/EFA	EPP
Last election	1 seat, 4.82%	4 seats, 17.22%	0 seats, 3.92%
Seats won	3	2	2
Seat change	▲2	▼2	▲2
Popular vote	350,339	239,946	193,354
Percentage	13.85%	9.49%	7.64%
Swing	▲9.03%	▼7.73%	▲3.72%
	Seventh party
Leader	Karl Erik Olsson
Party	Centre
Alliance	ALDE
Last election	2 seats, 7.16%
Seats won	1
Seat change	▼1
Popular vote	151,442
Percentage	5.99%
Swing	▼1.17%

The 1999 European Parliament election in Sweden was the election of MEP representing Sweden constituency for the 1999–2004 term of the European Parliament. It was part of the wider 1999 European election. The vote took place on 13 June.

== Results ==
The map shows which European party group received the most votes in each municipality

Party	Votes	%	Seats	+/–
Swedish Social Democratic Party	657,497	25.99	6	–1
Moderate Party	524,755	20.75	5	0
Left Party	400,073	15.82	3	0
Liberal People's Party	350,339	13.85	3	+2
Green Party	239,946	9.49	2	–2
Christian Democrats	193,354	7.64	2	+2
Centre Party	151,442	5.99	1	–1
Sweden Democrats	8,568	0.34	0	–
Socialist Justice Party	1,430	0.06	0	–
Natural Law Party	435	0.02	0	–
European Workers Party	99	0.00	0	–
Alliance Party	75	0.00	0	–
Hey You Party	72	0.00	0	–
Viking Party Sweden out of the EU	64	0.00	0	–
Beach Protection Party	47	0.00	0	–
Republicans	33	0.00	0	–
Communist League	32	0.00	0	–
Independent Liberals	24	0.00	0	–
Old School and Sports Party	21	0.00	0	–
Crisis	3	0.00	0	–
Dust	3	0.00	0	–
Other parties	1,125	0.04	0	–
Total	2,529,437	100.00	22	0
Valid votes	2,529,437	97.72		
Invalid/blank votes	59,077	2.28		
Total votes	2,588,514	100.00		
Registered voters/turnout	6,664,205	38.84		
Source: Europa Portalen
