= 2019 European Parliament election in Sweden =

- 26 May 2019

All 21 Swedish seats to the European Parliament Only top candidates on party ballots are shown.
- Opinion polls
- Turnout: 55.27% (▲4.20 pp)
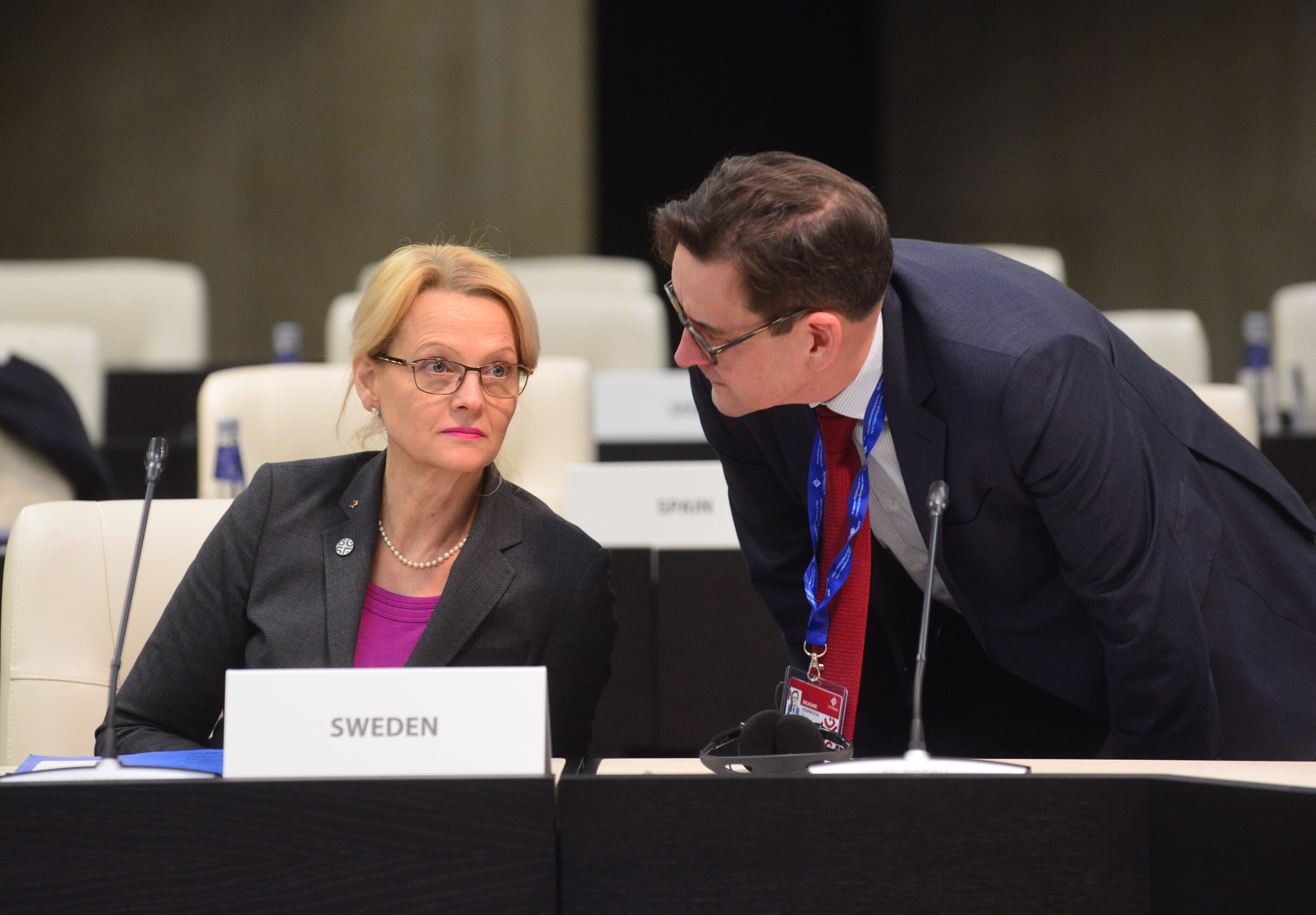

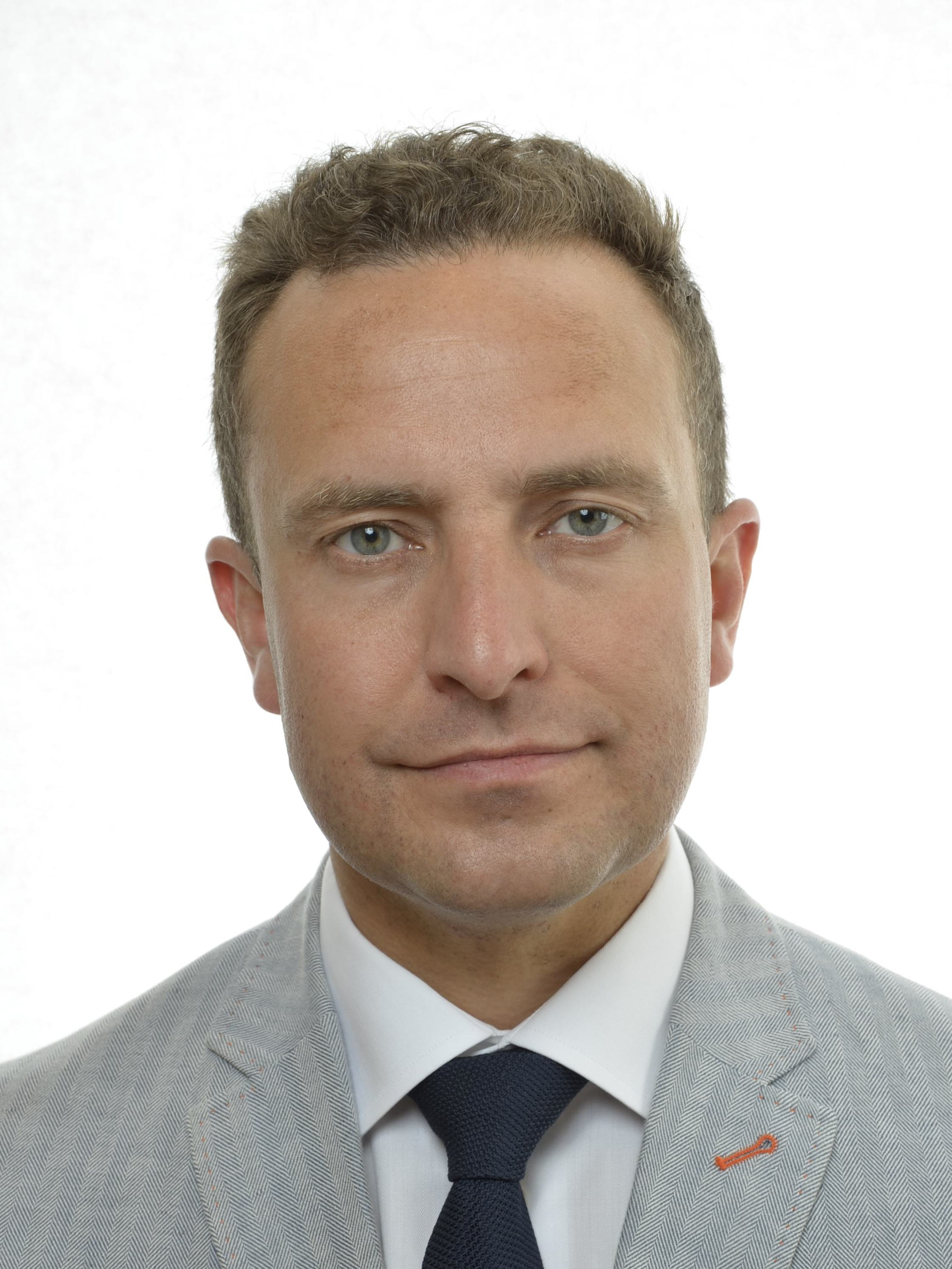

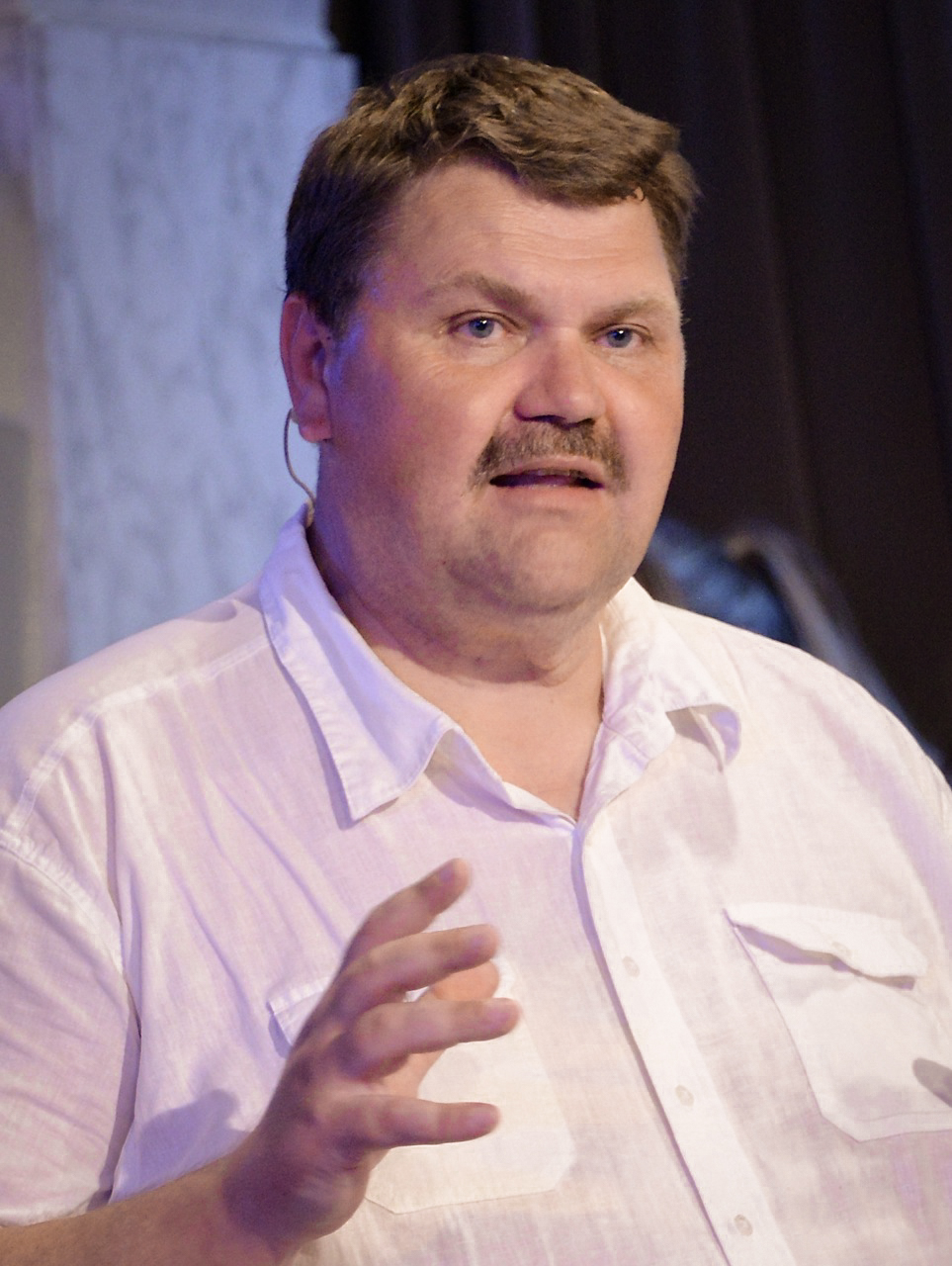

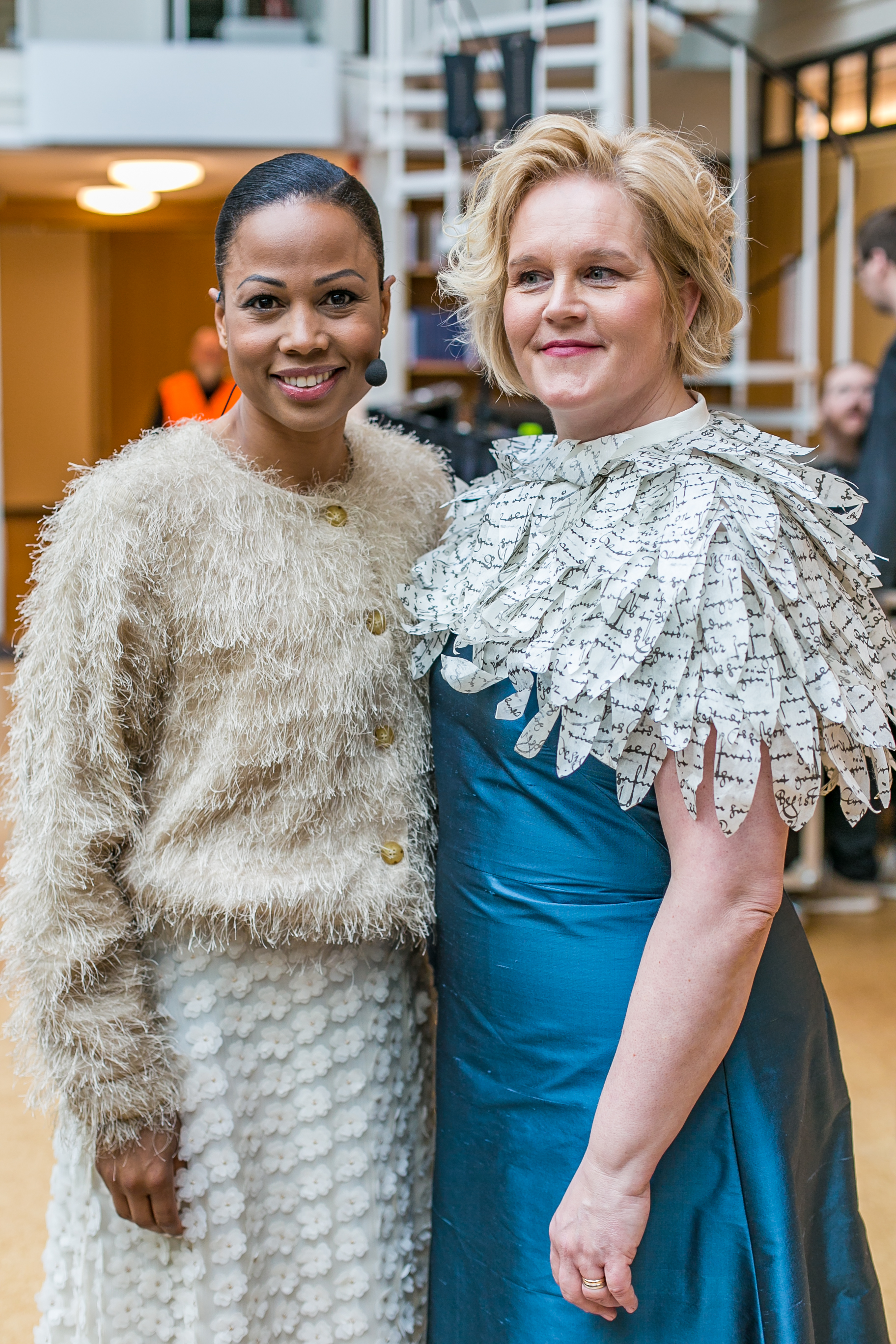

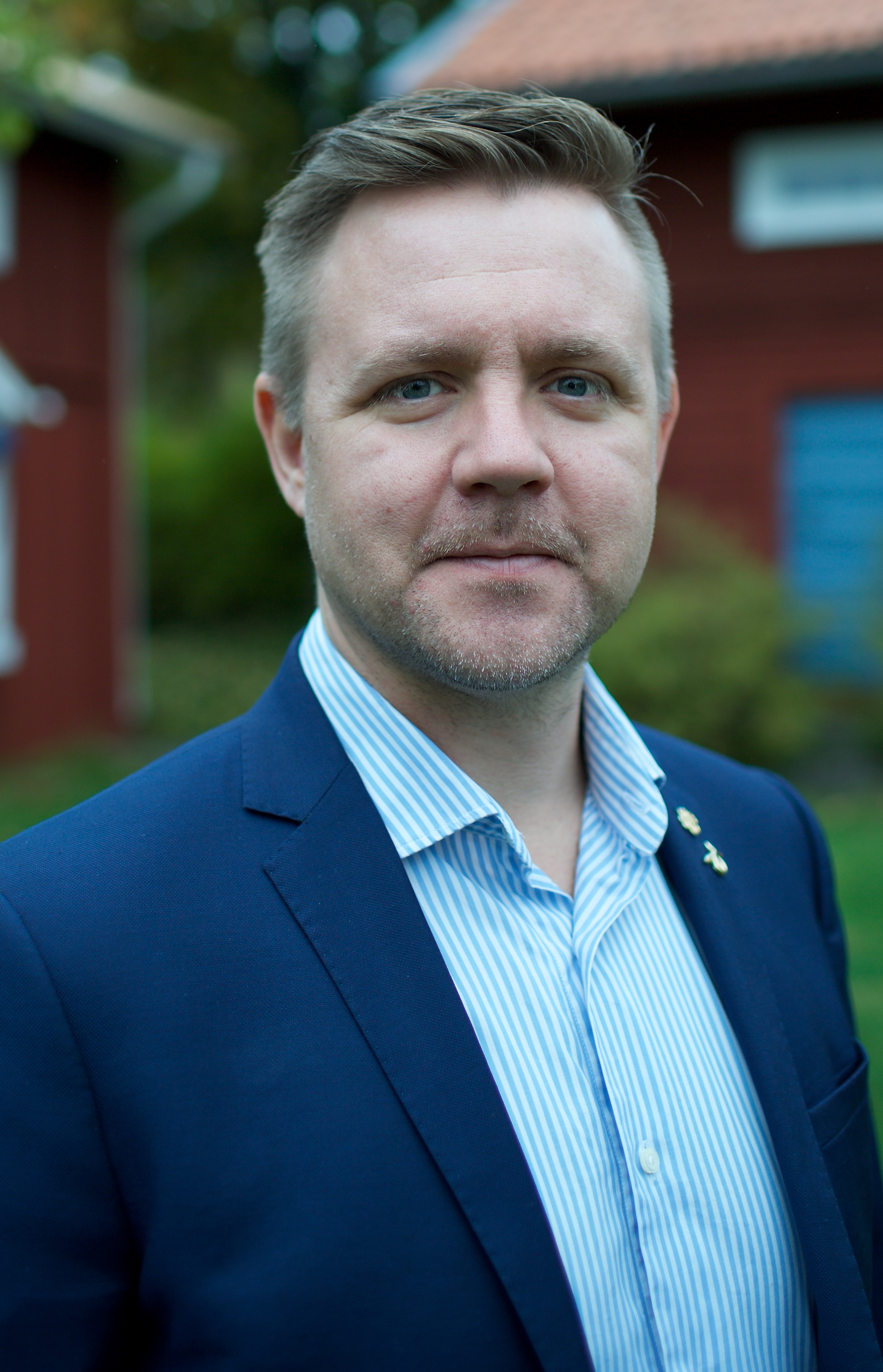

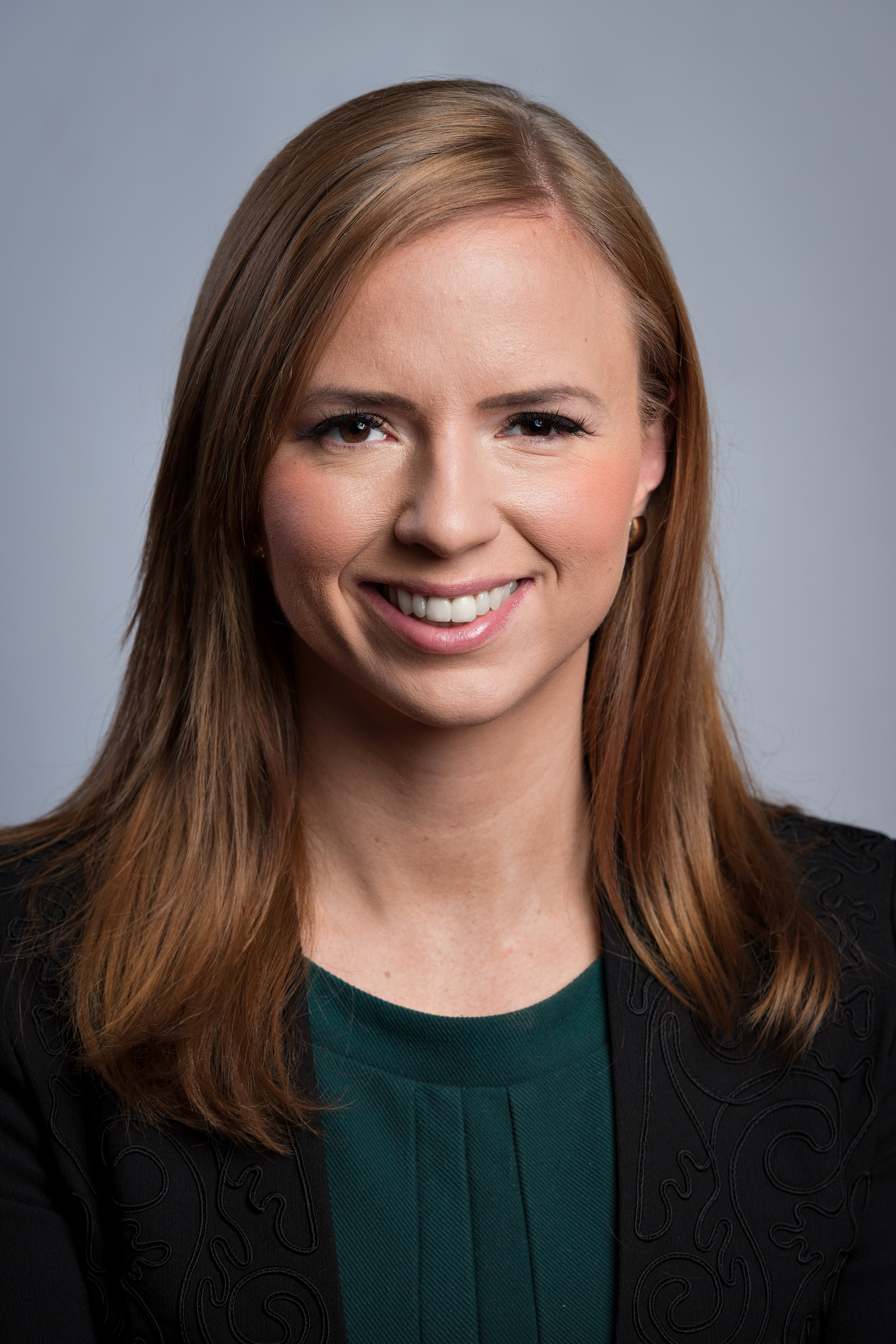

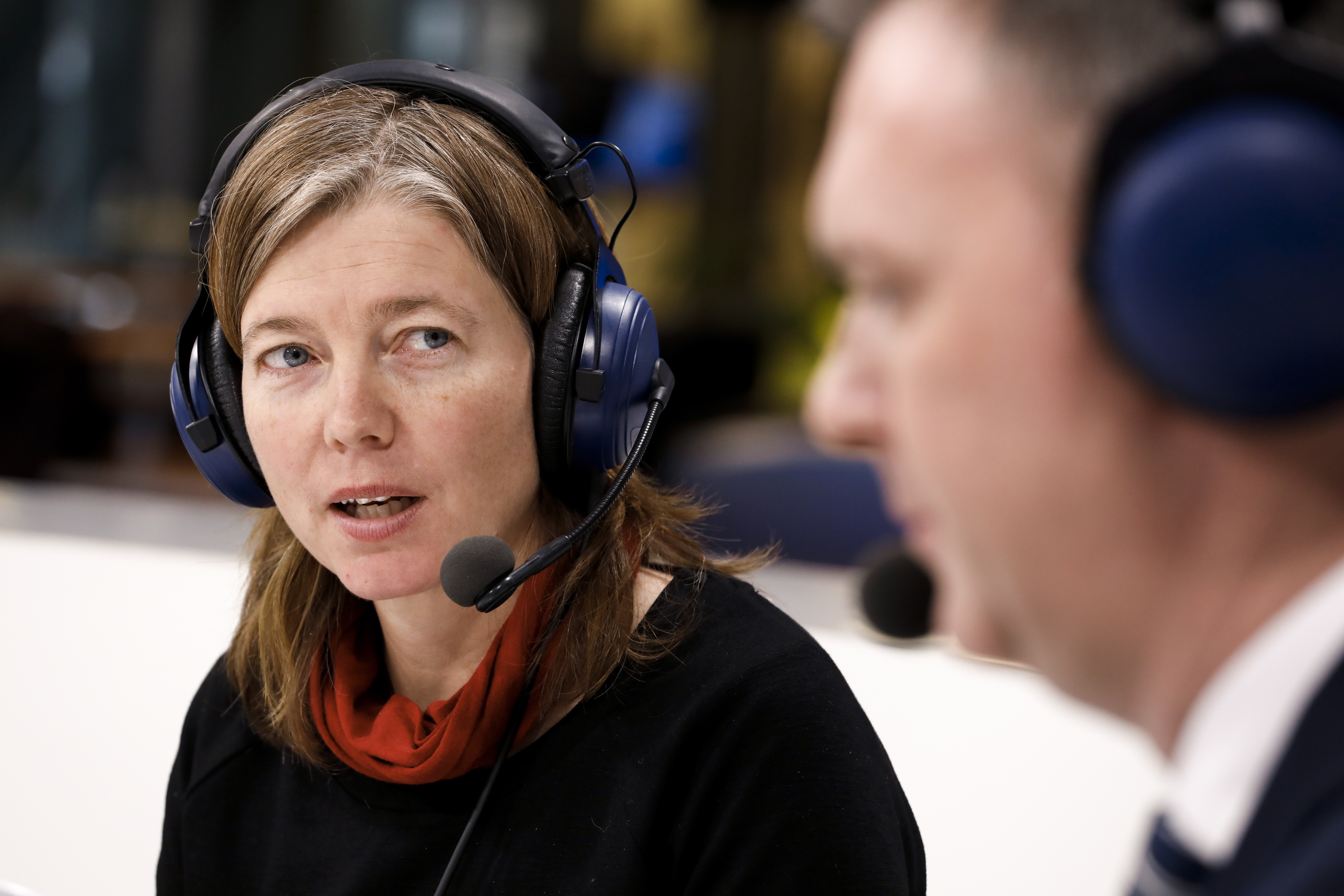

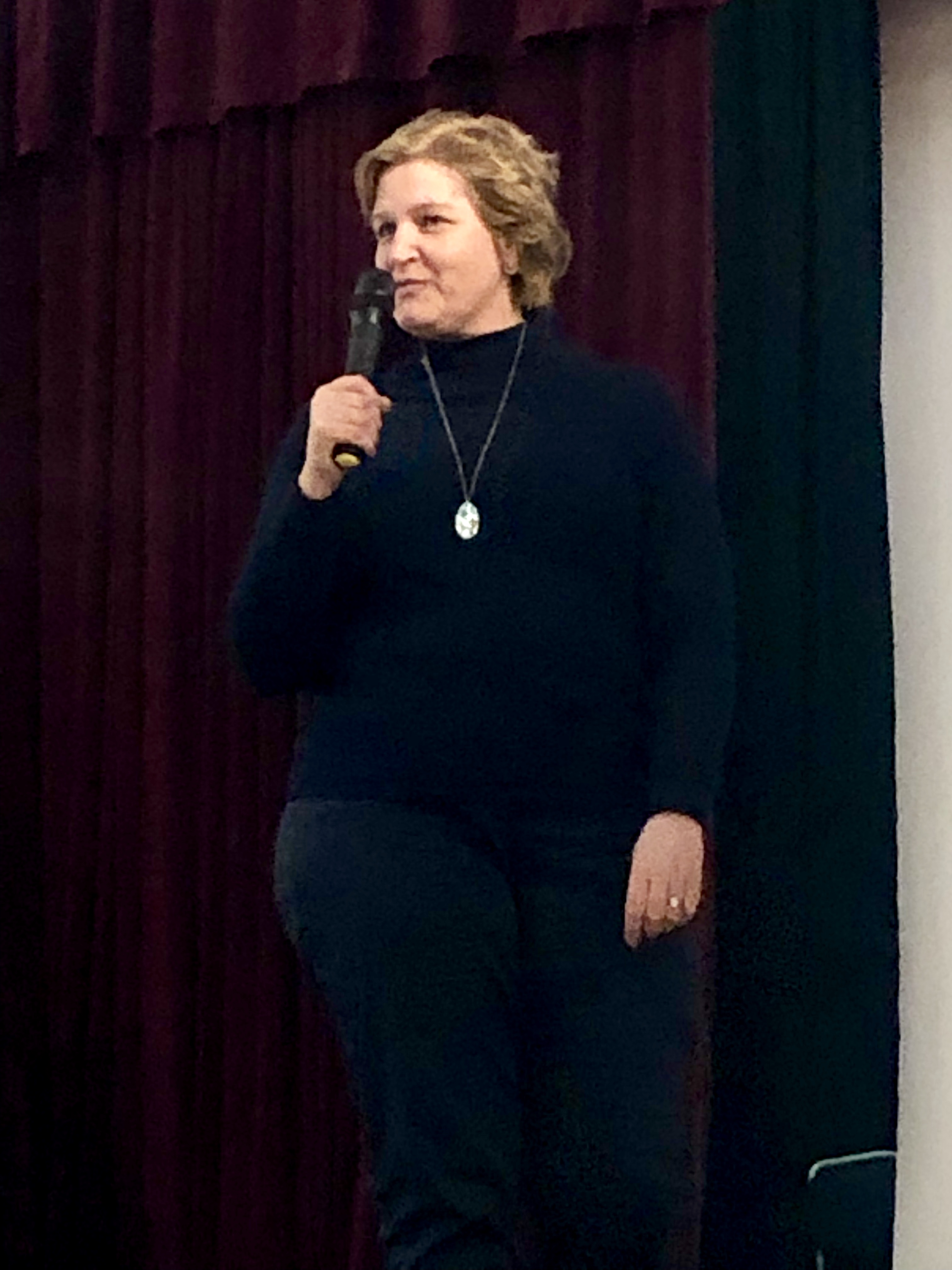

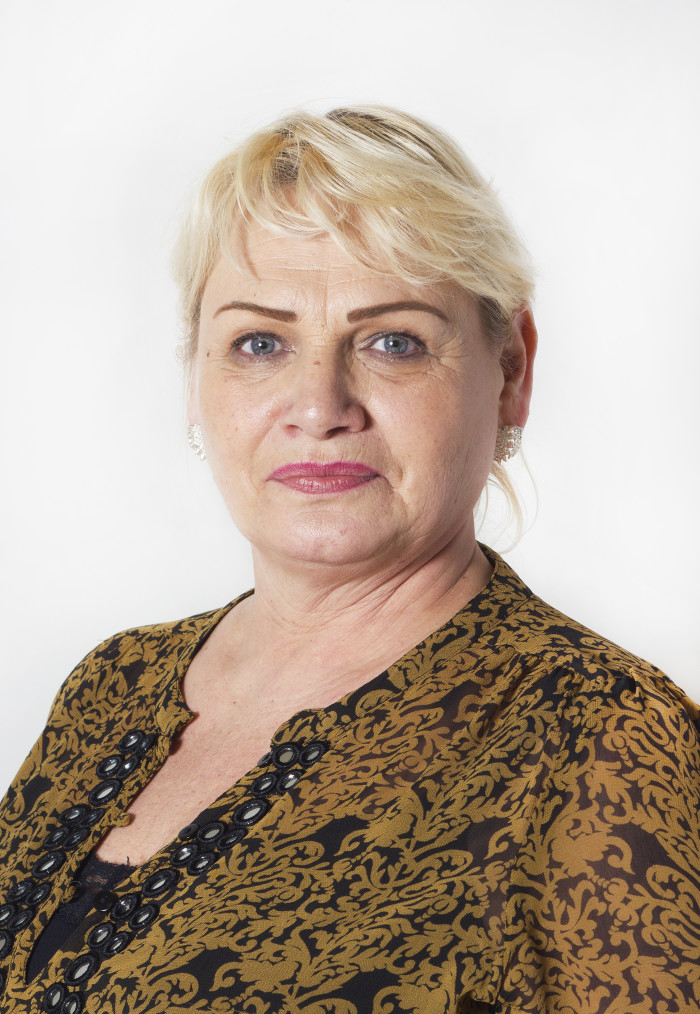
	First party	Second party	Third party
Candidate	Heléne Fritzon	Tomas Tobé	Peter Lundgren
Party	Social Democrats	Moderate	Sweden Democrats
Alliance	S&D	EPP	ECR
Last election	5 seats, 24.19%	3 seats, 13.65%	2 seats, 9.67%
Seats won	5	4	3
Seat change	Steady	▲1	▲1
Popular vote	974,589	698,770	636,877
Percentage	23.48%	16.83%	15.34%
Swing	▼0.71%	▲3.18%	▲5.67%
	Fourth party	Fifth party	Sixth party
Candidate	Alice Bah Kuhnke	Fredrick Federley	Sara Skyttedal
Party	Green	Centre	Christian Democrats
Alliance	Greens/EFA	ALDE	EPP
Last election	4 seats, 15.41%	1 seat, 6.49%	1 seat, 5.93%
Seats won	3	2	2
Seat change	▼1	▲1	▲1
Popular vote	478,258	447,641	357,856
Percentage	11.52%	10.78%	8.62%
Swing	▼3.89%	▲4.29%	▲2.69%
	Seventh party	Eighth party	Ninth party
Candidate	Malin Björk	Karin Karlsbro	Soraya Post
Party	Left	Liberals	Feminist Initiative
Alliance	GUE/NGL	ALDE	S&D
Last election	1 seat, 6.30%	2 seats, 9.91%	1 seat, 5.49%
Seats won	1	1	0
Seat change	Steady	▼1	▼1
Popular vote	282,300	171,419	32,143
Percentage	6.80%	4.13%	0.77%
Swing	▲0.50%	▼5.78%	▼4.72%

European Parliament elections were held in Sweden in May 2019 to elect the country's twenty members of the European Parliament.

== Opinion polls ==
=== Vote share ===
Polling firm	Fieldwork date	Sample size	V	S	MP	C	L	M	KD	SD	Fi	PP	Others	Lead
2019 election	26 May 2019	–	6.8	23.5	11.5	10.8	4.1	16.8	8.6	15.3	0.8	0.6	1.1	6.6
SKOP	19–24 May 2019	1,938	7.4	23.1	9.4	9.2	4.7	16.0	10.3	17.1	1.0	–	1.8	6.0
Sifo	20–23 May 2019	2,437	8.3	23.1	10.0	10.3	4.0	14.4	9.0	18.9	0.5	–	1.6	4.2
Ipsos	16–23 May 2019	3,155	7.2	23.9	9.9	8.5	4.5	13.6	12.5	16.9	0.9	–	2.1	7.0
Novus	6–22 May 2019	2,456	7.2	23.5	10.7	8.6	5.2	15.9	9.9	16.2	1.1	?	?	7.3
SKOP	19–20 May 2019	1,042	7.5	23.5	9.4	9.6	3.8	16.8	10.5	17.2	0.9	–	1.0	6.3
Inizio	10–16 May 2019	2,200	6.9	23.0	9.3	9.5	3.4	15.7	9.1	18.8	2.0	–	2.3	4.2
Sifo	10–15 May 2019	2,867	9.5	21.9	9.6	7.6	4.1	13.5	11.2	19.9	1.2	–	1.6	2.0
Sifo	2–9 May 2019	2,383	7.4	23.1	11.6	7.6	3.3	15.5	12.4	16.9	1.0	–	2.4	6.2
Inizio	1–9 May 2019	2,218	6.9	23.9	9.6	8.4	3.4	16.9	8.8	17.9	2.2	–	2.5	6.0
Novus	15–28 Apr 2019	1,792	11.1	24.8	10.6	7.4	5.3	12.6	9.7	13.7	1.1	1.9	1.9	11.1
Sifo	23–25 Apr 2019	1,834	8.2	21.0	10.0	6.3	3.4	16.5	10.7	19.9	1.7	–	2.4	1.1
Inizio	15–25 Apr 2019	2,068	7.6	24.9	8.7	9.5	3.7	15.9	9.0	17.4	1.4	–	1.9	7.5
Demoskop	12–24 Apr 2019	1,595	7.9	23.4	9.0	6.1	3.3	17.0	10.4	19.3	1.0	–	2.6	4.1
Ipsos	9–22 Apr 2019	1,507	10	23	9	8	6	15	10	17	1	–	2	6
SKOP	7–27 Mar 2019	1,510	7.6	25.7	9.2	7.6	4.5	17.7	9.3	15.1	1.4	–	1.9	8.0
Sifo	19–25 Mar 2019	2,097	8.6	25.2	8.1	7.1	4.0	16.2	10.4	17.3	1.5	–	1.5	7.9
Novus	11–24 Mar 2019	1,842	10.6	25.5	9.2	9.2	5.0	13.7	8.9	14.3	1.2	1.3	1.2	11.2
Sifo	20–25 Feb 2019	1,537	10.0	27.5	6.4	5.8	3.8	16.4	8.6	18.0	1.2	–	2.4	9.5
2014 election	25 May 2014	–	6.3	24.2	15.4	6.5	9.9	13.7	5.9	9.7	5.5	2.2	0.7	8.8
2014 election	25 May 2014	–	1	5	4	1	2	3	1	2	1	0	0	1

== Results ==
Party	Votes	%	Seats	+/–
Swedish Social Democratic Party	974,589	23.48	5	0
Moderate Party	698,770	16.83	4	+1
Sweden Democrats	636,877	15.34	3	+1
Green Party	478,258	11.52	3	–1
Centre Party	447,641	10.78	2	+1
Christian Democrats	357,856	8.62	2	+1
Left Party	282,300	6.80	1	0
Liberals	171,419	4.13	1	–1
Feminist Initiative	32,143	0.77	0	–1
Pirate Party	26,526	0.64	0	0
Alternative for Sweden	19,178	0.46	0	New
Citizens' Coalition	6,363	0.15	0	New
Turning Point Party	5,171	0.12	0	New
Animals' Party	4,105	0.10	0	0
Independent Rural Party	2,059	0.05	0	New
Christian Values Party	1,596	0.04	0	New
Direct Democrats	1,276	0.03	0	New
Communist Party	974	0.02	0	New
We Social Conservatives	715	0.02	0	New
Classical Liberal Party	702	0.02	0	0
Basic Income Party	213	0.01	0	New
Scania Party	117	0.00	0	New
Freedom and Justice Party	103	0.00	0	0
Security Party	53	0.00	0	New
New Reform	50	0.00	0	New
Common Sense in Sweden	33	0.00	0	New
European Workers Party	29	0.00	0	0
Solens Frihetsparti	19	0.00	0	New
BRP	8	0.00	0	New
The New Party	7	0.00	0	New
Electoral Cooperation Party	3	0.00	0	New
Kustkult	2	0.00	0	New
Parties not on the ballot	2,315	0.06	0	–
Total	4,151,470	100.00	21	+1
Valid votes	4,151,470	99.13		
Invalid/blank votes	36,378	0.87		
Total votes	4,187,848	100.00		
Registered voters/turnout	7,576,917	55.27		
Source: Val

== Voter demographics ==
Voter demographics of the 2019 European Parliament election in Sweden, according to the Swedish Television's exit polls.

Gender and age

Cohort	Percentage of cohort voting for				
	Social Democrats	Moderates	Sweden Democrats	Other parties	Total
Females	24	16	12	48	100
Males	22	18	19	41	100
18–21 years old	11	20	9	60	100
22–30 years old	16	16	10	58	100
31–50 years old	20	16	14	50	100
51–64 years old	25	17	19	39	100
65 years old and older	30	18	16	36	100

Employment

Cohort	Percentage of cohort voting for				
	Social Democrats	Moderates	Sweden Democrats	Other parties	Total
Gainfully employed	21	17	14	48	100
Unemployed	25	16	24	34	100
Retired	30	17	17	36	100
Permanently outside the labor market	27	5	26	42	100
Students	14	16	6	64	100

Occupation

Cohort	Percentage of cohort voting for				
	Social Democrats	Moderates	Sweden Democrats	Other parties	Total
Blue-collar workers	31	11	21	37	100
Blue-collar workers, foremen	28	14	28	30	100
White-collar workers	24	16	11	49	100
White-collar workers, supervisors	22	22	12	44	100
Managers	16	28	14	42	100
Farmers	3	16	15	66	100
Self-employed	16	16	18	50	100
Business owners	8	22	20	50	100

Union membership

Cohort	Percentage of cohort voting for				
	Social Democrats	Moderates	Sweden Democrats	Other parties	Total
Blue-collar unions (LO)	37	9	23	31	100
White-collar unions (TCO)	30	15	10	45	100
Professional unions (SACO)	21	17	6	56	100

Education

Cohort	Percentage of cohort voting for				
	Social Democrats	Moderates	Sweden Democrats	Other parties	Total
Less than nine years of school	30	11	27	32	100
Compulsory comprehensive school	35	13	24	28	100
Secondary school	28	16	22	34	100
Tertiary non-academic education	22	18	23	37	100
College education	20	18	9	53	100
Post-graduate education	19	13	7	61	100

Public/Private sector employment

Cohort	Percentage of cohort voting for				
	Social Democrats	Moderates	Sweden Democrats	Other parties	Total
Government employment	27	14	13	46	100
Local government employment	30	13	12	45	100
Private sector employment	19	20	18	43	100

Foreign born

Cohort	Percentage of cohort voting for				
	Social Democrats	Moderates	Sweden Democrats	Other parties	Total
Raised in Sweden	23	17	15	45	100
Raised in Scandinavia outside of Sweden	33	15	18	34	100
Raised in Europe outside of Scandinavia	27	18	16	39	100
Raised outside of Europe	36	6	14	44	100

Church attendance

Cohort	Percentage of cohort voting for				
	Social Democrats	Moderates	Sweden Democrats	Other parties	Total
At least once a month	20	7	14	59	100
A few times a year	24	17	16	43	100
Rarely	26	19	16	39	100
Never	22	17	15	46	100

== Referendums ==
In connection with the 2019 European Parliament elections, two local referendums were held in Sweden. In Svedala municipality, citizens took a stand on whether a prison should be established there, with 67.5% voting no. In the municipalities of Borgholm and Mörbylånga, residents voted on a proposal for a merger to the municipality of Öland, which gave no in both municipalities.
