= 2004 European Parliament election in Sweden =

- 13 June 2004

19 seats to the European Parliament
- Turnout: 37.85% (▼0.99 pp)
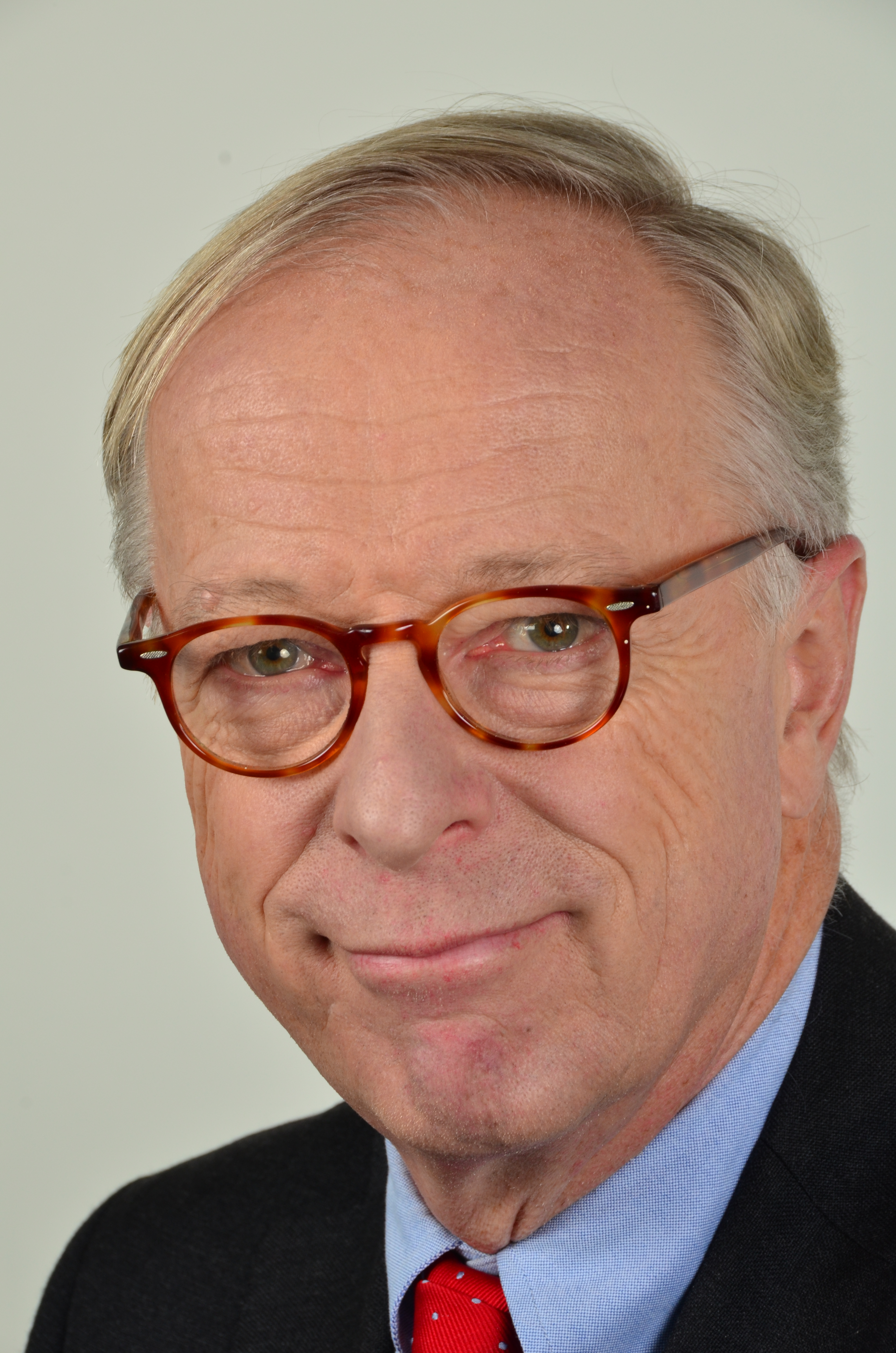

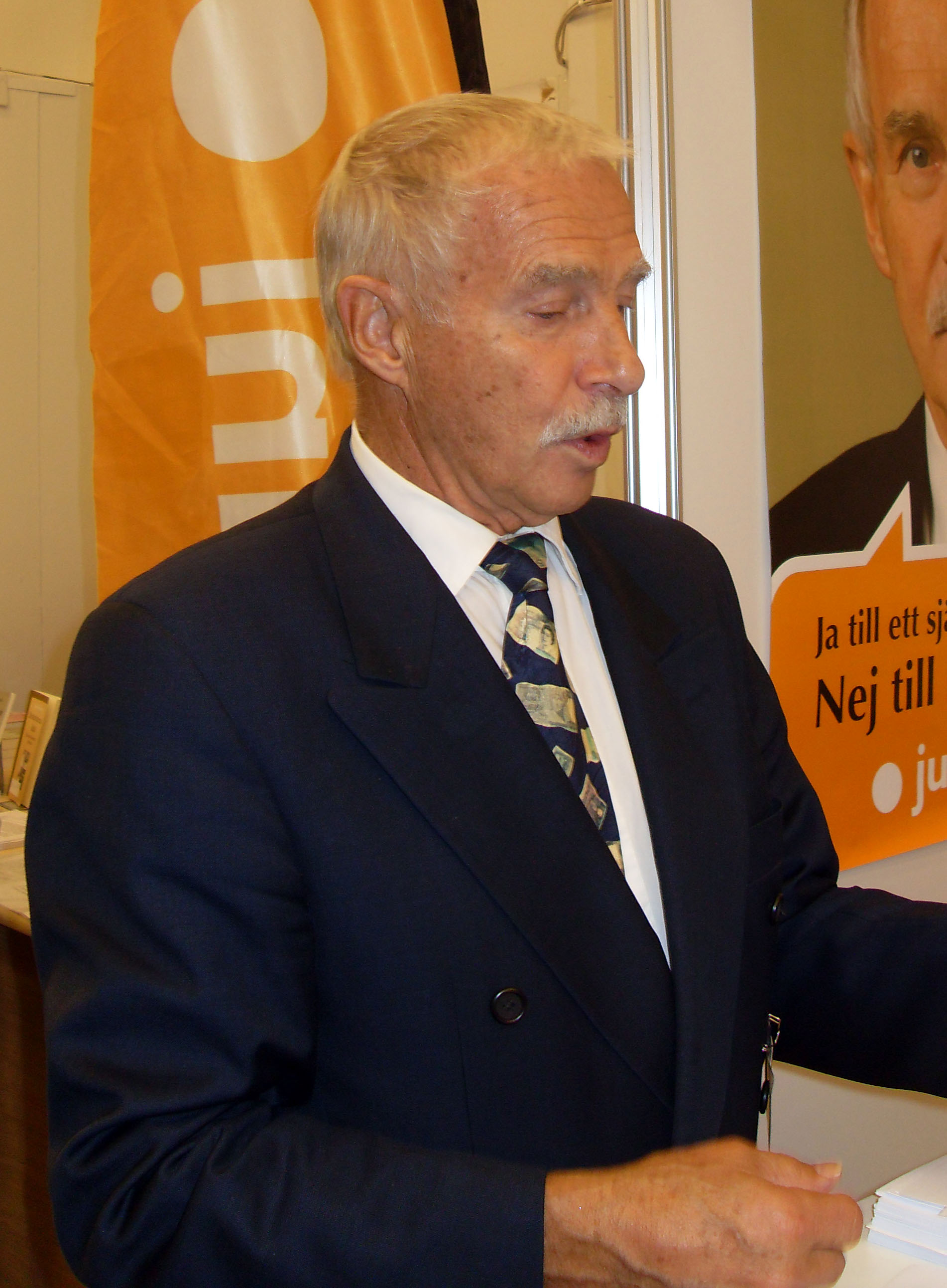

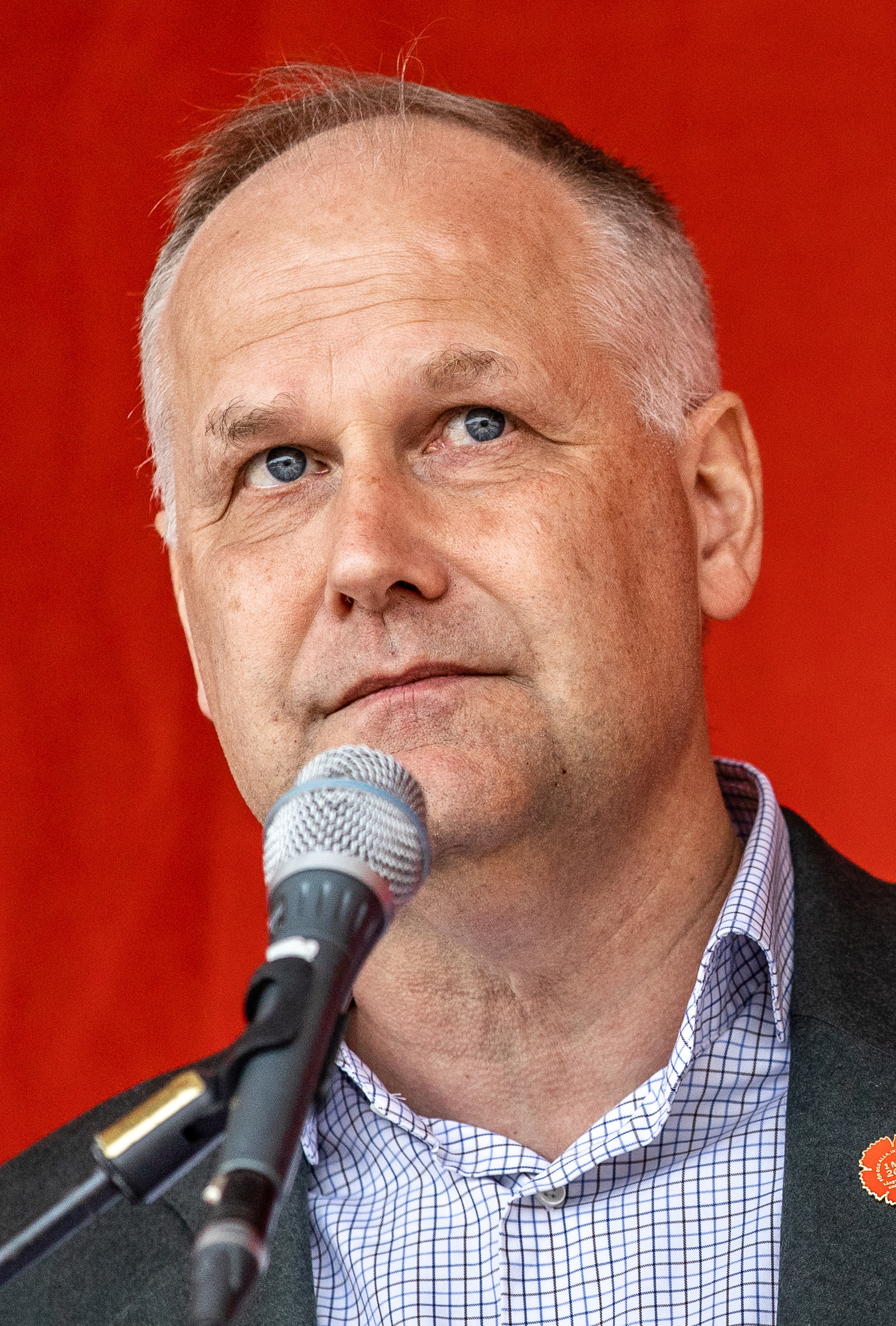

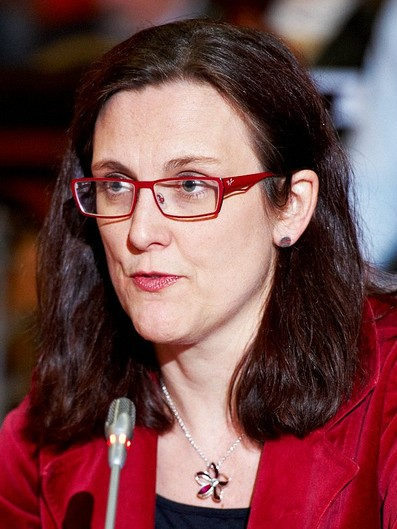

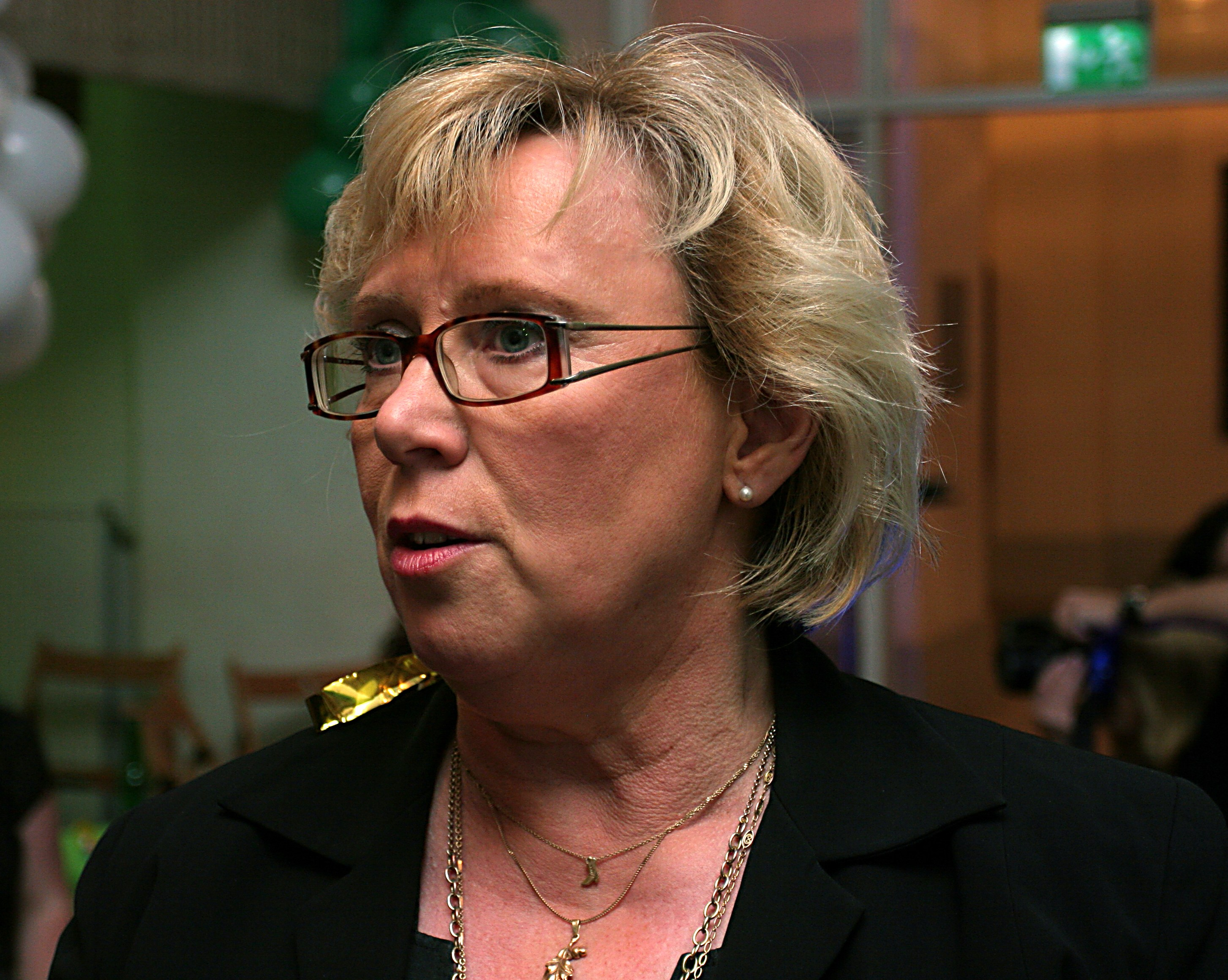

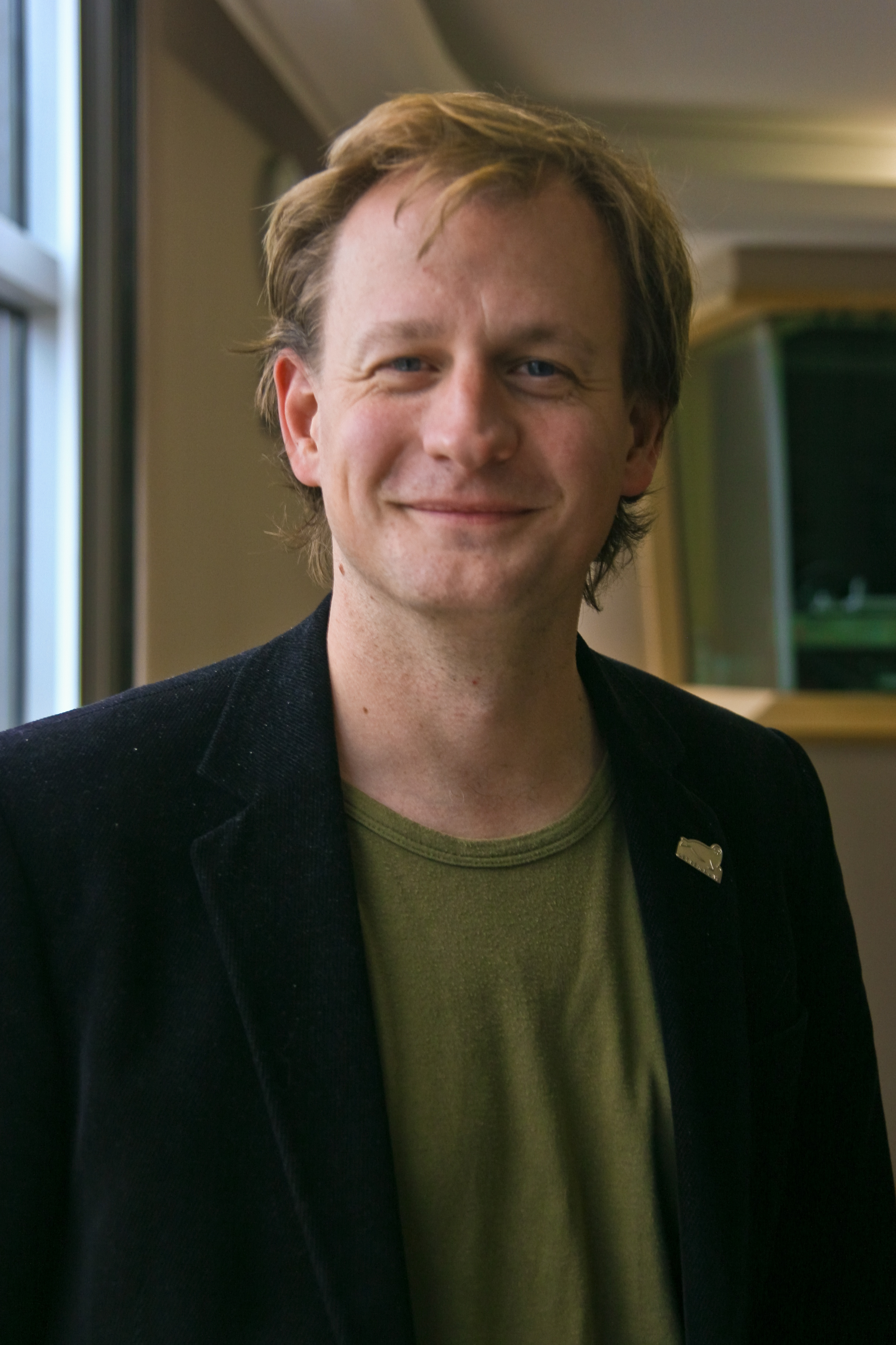

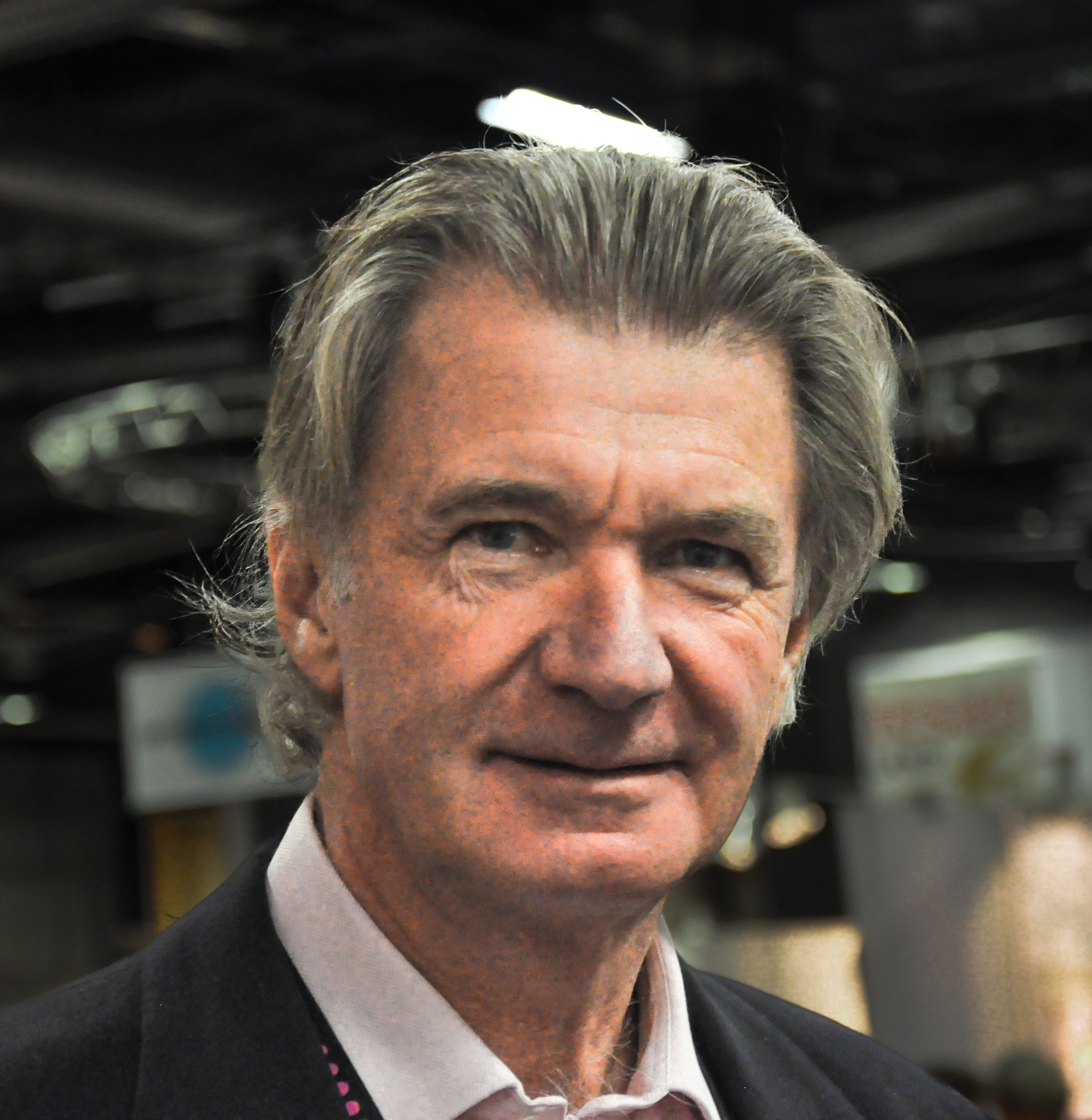
	First party	Second party	Third party
Leader	Inger Segelström	Gunnar Hökmark	Nils Lundgren
Party	Social Democrats	Moderate	June List
Alliance	PES	EPP	EUD
Last election	6 seats, 25.99%	5 seats, 20.75%	new
Seats won	5	4	3
Seat change	▼1	▼1	▲3
Popular vote	616,963	458,398	363,472
Percentage	24.56%	18.25%	14.47%
Swing	▼1.43%	▼2.50%	new
	Fourth party	Fifth party	Sixth party
Leader	Jonas Sjöstedt	Cecilia Malmström	Lena Ek
Party	Left	Liberals	Centre
Alliance	NGLA	ALDE	ALDE
Last election	3 seats, 15.82%	3 seats, 13.85%	1 seat, 5.99%
Seats won	2	2	1
Seat change	▼1	▼1	0
Popular vote	321,344	247,750	157,258
Percentage	12.79%	9.86%	6.26%
Swing	▼3.03%	▼3.99%	▲0.27%
	Seventh party	Eighth party
Leader	Carl Schlyter	Anders Wijkman
Party	Green	Christian Democrats
Alliance	Greens/EFA	EPP
Last election	2 seats, 9.49%	2 seats, 7.64%
Seats won	1	1
Seat change	▼1	▼1
Popular vote	149,603	142,704
Percentage	5.96%	5.68%
Swing	▼3.53%	▼1.96%

The 2004 European Parliament election in Sweden was the election of MEP representing Sweden constituency for the 2004-2009 term of the European Parliament. It was part of the wider 2004 European election. The vote took place on 13 June. The ruling Social Democrats polled poorly, receiving their worst result in a nation-wide election since 1908, and the eurosceptic June List, which had been formed just four months before, won 14.5% of the vote and three MEPs in what was widely seen as a surprise result.

== Results ==
The map shows which European party group received the most votes in each municipality

The Insight Party, Struggle of the Union Citizens, International Integration Party, Vision Europe Party, International Integration Party, Republicans right and all the various lists of Bosse Persson had only one candidate on their lists. The Communist League had 4 candidates, but only got 2 votes.

Party	Votes	%	Seats	+/–
Swedish Social Democratic Party	616,963	24.56	5	–1
Moderate Party	458,398	18.25	4	–1
June List	363,472	14.47	3	New
Left Party	321,344	12.79	2	–1
Liberal People's Party	247,750	9.86	2	–1
Centre Party	157,258	6.26	1	0
Green Party	149,603	5.96	1	–1
Christian Democrats	142,704	5.68	1	–1
Sweden Democrats	28,303	1.13	0	0
EU Opponents	15,505	0.62	0	New
National Democrats	7,209	0.29	0	New
Socialist Justice Party	2,087	0.08	0	0
Freedom and Justice Party	147	0.01	0	New
European Workers Party	137	0.01	0	0
Swedish National Democratic Party	66	0.00	0	New
Transparency Party	37	0.00	0	New
Union Citizens' Fight for an EU Superstate	36	0.00	0	New
Right Party the Conservatives	29	0.00	0	New
Vision Europe Party	25	0.00	0	New
EU Critical Santa Party	19	0.00	0	New
Viking Party	9	0.00	0	0
International Integration Party	8	0.00	0	New
Motbokspartiet	8	0.00	0	New
EU out of Sweden Party	4	0.00	0	New
Communist League	2	0.00	0	0
EU-Critic Party	2	0.00	0	New
Republican Right	1	0.00	0	New
Other parties	943	0.04	0	–
Total	2,512,069	100.00	19	–3
Valid votes	2,512,069	97.20		
Invalid/blank votes	72,395	2.80		
Total votes	2,584,464	100.00		
Registered voters/turnout	6,827,870	37.85		
Source: Val
