= Farida al-Abani =

Swedish politician

Co-leader of Feminist Initiative
- In office 10 February 2019 – 2022 Co-leading with Gita Nabavi (2019–2020), Teysir Subhi (2021–2022)
- Preceded by: Gudrun Schyman

Personal details
- Born: Farida Massaoud al-Abani; 16 September 1988 (age 38) Tajura, Libya

Farida Massaoud al-Abani (born 16 September 1988) is a Swedish politician who served as the co-leader of the Feminist Initiative political party from 2019 to 2022, serving alongside Gita Nabavi and Teysir Subhi. She previously was the party's spokesperson on social issues and migration policy.

Born in Tajura, Libya, al-Abani moved with her family to Sweden at the age of three. She has a degree in public health and is active within the temperance movement. She was awarded the title Årets eldsjäl by IOGT-NTO in 2017. al-Abani has previously served on the board of the women's organization Streetgäris.

In February 2019, al-Abani succeeded Gudrun Schyman as one of two party leaders of Feminist Initiative. She served alongside Gita Nabavi, incumbent since 2018, until Nabavi resigned on 8 March 2020. al-Abani remained as the sole leader of the party until 2021. From 2021 to 2022 she served as co-leader alongside Teysir Subhi.
