= Victoria Kawesa =

Swedish politician (born 1975)

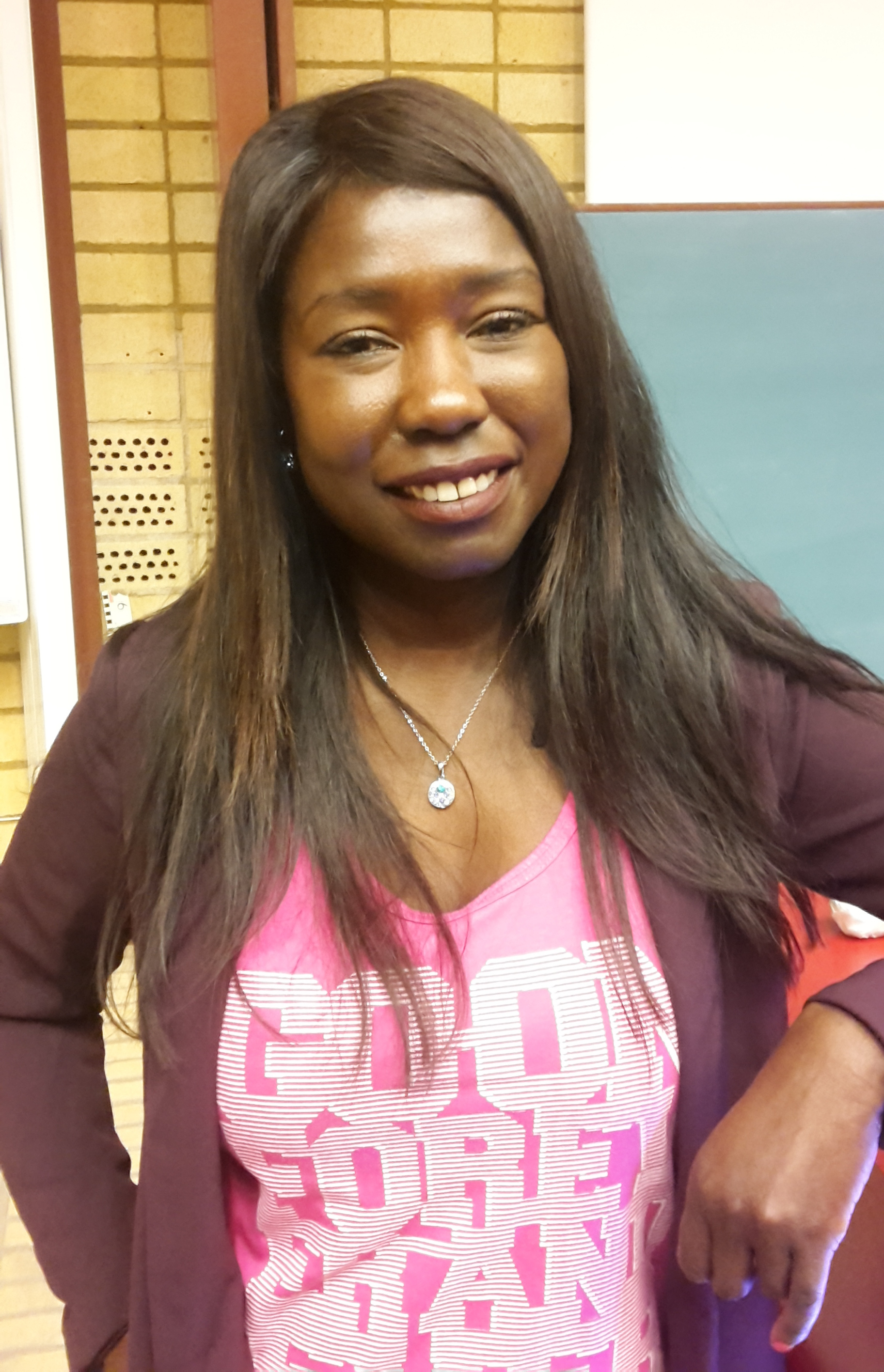

Leader of Feminist Initiative
- In office 26 March 2017 – 15 September 2017

Personal details
- Born: 12 April 1975 (age 50) Uganda
- Party: Feminist Initiative

Victoria Kawesa (born 12 April 1975) is a Swedish politician and former leader of the Feminist Initiative party. In March 2017, she was elected the leader of the party, along with Gudrun Schyman. Kawesa was the first black party leader in Swedish history. In September 2017, she resigned, citing personal reasons. Kawesa was charged and found guilty of copyright violation. She is a former lecturer at Södertörn University.

== Background ==
Kawesa came to Sweden as a nine-year-old with her family who had fled from the war in Uganda, and the family resided in Tensta outside of Stockholm.

== Plagiarism and assault ==
In April 2017, a police investigation was commenced against Kawesa after she was accused of plagiarizing a doctoral work and presented it as her own research, for which she was given an admonition by Linköping University. She has previously (2013) been reported to have plagiarized another researcher's project application. Kawesa was found guilty by the Crown Court of Stockholm and sentenced to 15,000 kr fines and 6000 kr in damages.

In 2018, Kawesa was charged with assault after hitting a man in the face and kicking him at a Stockholm subway station. The incident occurred at 17:52, 11 January 2018, during which Kawesa had attempted to walk through the subway barrier without using her Access card. Kawesa claims self defence after the man first attacked her. Surveillance footage showed otherwise, and Kawesa was convicted of battery, given a suspended sentence and ordered to pay a fine of 36,000 Swedish kronor.
