= Stina Svensson =

Swedish politician (born 1970)

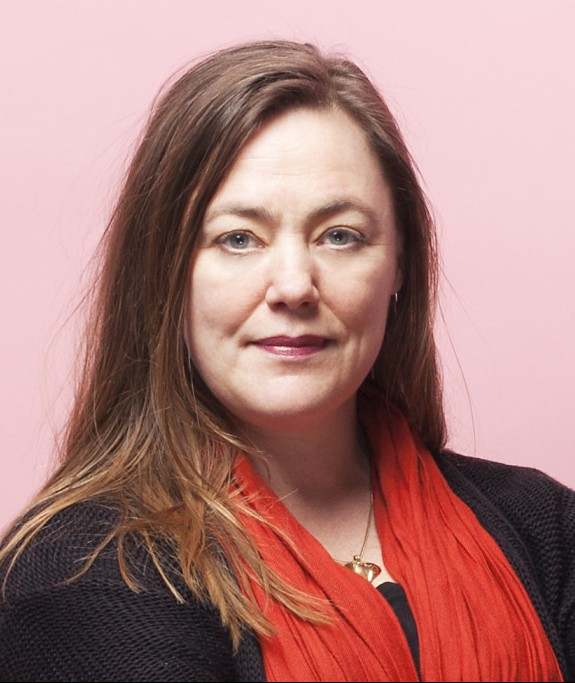
Stina Svensson

Stina Svensson (born 1970) is a Swedish politician, who served as spokesperson of the Feminist Initiative party from March 2011 to 2015, with Gudrun Schyman and then Sissela Nordling Blanco.

== Biography ==
Born in Linköping, she has had a number of occupations, working, among other things, as a student assistant, assisting lighting technician, metal lather, and tour technician for Gothenburg City Theatre. Svensson lives in Gothenburg, and has a bachelor's degree in pedagogy, specializing on public health.

Chosen as spokesperson of the feminist political party Feminist Initiative in March 2011, she is a candidate for the Riksdag in the September 2014 general election. She has also been active in LGBTQ advocacy.
