= Results of the 2009 European Parliament election in Sweden =

Sweden held its 2009 European Parliament election to nominate Sweden's 18 members of the European Parliament on 7 June 2009. The election was held in the same week as 26 other member states.

== Results ==
| Party | Votes | % | Seats | | | |
| Party | Votes | % | Won | +/– | Post-Lisbon | +/– |
|---|---|---|---|---|---|---|
| Swedish Social Democratic Party | 773,513 | 24.41 | 5 | 0 | 6 | +1 |
| Moderate Party | 596,710 | 18.83 | 4 | 0 | 4 | 0 |
| Liberals | 430,385 | 13.58 | 3 | +1 | 3 | 0 |
| Green Party | 349,114 | 11.02 | 2 | +1 | 2 | 0 |
| Pirate Party | 225,915 | 7.13 | 1 | +1 | 2 | +1 |
| Left Party | 179,182 | 5.66 | 1 | –1 | 1 | 0 |
| Centre Party | 173,414 | 5.47 | 1 | 0 | 1 | 0 |
| Christian Democrats | 148,141 | 4.68 | 1 | 0 | 1 | 0 |
| June List | 112,355 | 3.55 | 0 | –3 | 0 | 0 |
| Sweden Democrats | 103,584 | 3.27 | 0 | 0 | 0 | 0 |
| Feminist Initiative | 70,434 | 2.22 | 0 | New | 0 | New |
| Labour Initiative (SP–RS) | 2,862 | 0.09 | 0 | 0 | 0 | 0 |
| National Democrats | 1,329 | 0.04 | 0 | 0 | 0 | 0 |
| European Workers Party | 196 | 0.01 | 0 | 0 | 0 | 0 |
| Socialists | 78 | 0.00 | 0 | New | 0 | New |
| Swedish National Democratic Party | 57 | 0.00 | 0 | 0 | 0 | 0 |
| Partiet.se | 32 | 0.00 | 0 | New | 0 | New |
| 666 for an EU Superstate | 28 | 0.00 | 0 | 0 | 0 | 0 |
| Freedom and Justice Party | 28 | 0.00 | 0 | 0 | 0 | 0 |
| Communist League | 18 | 0.00 | 0 | 0 | 0 | 0 |
| Democratic National Party | 15 | 0.00 | 0 | New | 0 | New |
| Blankledamöterna | 13 | 0.00 | 0 | New | 0 | New |
| Nordic Union | 11 | 0.00 | 0 | New | 0 | New |
| Republican Right | 2 | 0.00 | 0 | 0 | 0 | 0 |
| Parties not on the ballot | 1,130 | 0.04 | 0 | – | 0 | – |
| Total | 3,168,546 | 100.00 | 18 | –1 | 20 | +2 |
| Valid votes | 3,168,546 | 98.17 | | | | |
| Invalid/blank votes | 59,015 | 1.83 | | | | |
| Total votes | 3,227,561 | 100.00 | | | | |
| Registered voters/turnout | 7,088,303 | 45.53 | | | | |
Source: Val

== Results by county ==
The Swedish results are counted by county only, since the seats are shared on a national basis, rendering eight fewer counting areas than in Riksdag elections.

=== Percentage share ===
| Location | Land | Turnout | Share | Votes | S | M | FP | MP | PP | V | C | KD | JL | SD | F! | Other |
|---|---|---|---|---|---|---|---|---|---|---|---|---|---|---|---|---|
| Blekinge | G | 40.6 | 1.5 | 46,834 | 28.6 | 16.4 | 11.1 | 8.4 | 6.9 | 5.7 | 6.3 | 4.1 | 2.6 | 7.9 | 2.0 | 0.1 |
| Dalarna | S | 41.2 | 2.7 | 87,066 | 30.2 | 12.7 | 11.8 | 9.0 | 7.4 | 7.8 | 6.2 | 4.0 | 5.6 | 3.1 | 2.0 | 0.1 |
| Gotland | G | 43.9 | 0.6 | 19,717 | 26.1 | 15.0 | 10.2 | 11.7 | 7.0 | 5.5 | 14.4 | 2.9 | 2.4 | 1.3 | 3.2 | 0.2 |
| Gävleborg | N | 37.8 | 2.5 | 80,447 | 31.0 | 12.5 | 10.5 | 9.8 | 6.4 | 8.2 | 6.8 | 3.7 | 5.5 | 4.1 | 1.4 | 0.1 |
| Halland | G | 46.6 | 3.3 | 103,476 | 23.7 | 22.9 | 14.0 | 9.4 | 6.3 | 3.8 | 7.9 | 4.5 | 2.7 | 3.4 | 1.3 | 0.1 |
| Jämtland | N | 41.3 | 1.3 | 40,674 | 34.7 | 10.1 | 6.6 | 9.2 | 5.9 | 6.7 | 14.0 | 2.4 | 7.1 | 2.0 | 1.2 | 0.1 |
| Jönköping | G | 45.1 | 3.6 | 112,851 | 24.9 | 15.9 | 10.5 | 8.1 | 5.6 | 4.9 | 6.8 | 15.3 | 3.9 | 3.4 | 0.7 | 0.1 |
| Kalmar | G | 43.1 | 2.4 | 77,248 | 29.6 | 15.5 | 9.6 | 8.7 | 6.5 | 5.6 | 10.5 | 6.2 | 3.3 | 3.3 | 1.0 | 0.2 |
| Kronoberg | G | 42.6 | 1.8 | 58,072 | 23.9 | 17.2 | 10.6 | 8.9 | 6.4 | 9.4 | 8.7 | 6.0 | 3.2 | 4.7 | 1.1 | 0.0 |
| Norrbotten | N | 40.4 | 2.5 | 77,763 | 39.6 | 10.1 | 6.6 | 7.0 | 7.8 | 11.4 | 3.8 | 3.3 | 6.6 | 1.9 | 1.6 | 0.5 |
| Skåne | G | 43.2 | 12.3 | 390,270 | 22.2 | 22.9 | 14.6 | 9.6 | 7.3 | 3.9 | 4.5 | 3.3 | 2.0 | 6.5 | 2.7 | 0.2 |
| Stockholm | S | 51.1 | 23.4 | 742,301 | 16.6 | 24.9 | 18.1 | 13.8 | 7.1 | 4.9 | 3.0 | 3.7 | 2.5 | 1.9 | 3.3 | 0.2 |
| Södermanland | S | 44.1 | 2.8 | 87,958 | 29.3 | 17.5 | 12.9 | 10.8 | 6.7 | 5.0 | 5.5 | 4.2 | 3.5 | 2.8 | 1.7 | 0.2 |
| Uppsala | S | 48.3 | 3.8 | 119,531 | 21.0 | 17.6 | 16.0 | 13.0 | 7.2 | 5.7 | 6.1 | 4.6 | 3.7 | 2.2 | 2.7 | 0.1 |
| Värmland | S | 40.7 | 2.7 | 85,173 | 31.2 | 14.8 | 11.8 | 9.2 | 6.4 | 6.5 | 7.5 | 4.1 | 3.7 | 3.3 | 1.2 | 0.2 |
| Västerbotten | N | 45.5 | 2.9 | 90,458 | 30.5 | 7.7 | 8.7 | 10.0 | 7.9 | 8.4 | 5.1 | 4.9 | 12.9 | 1.3 | 2.2 | 0.4 |
| Västernorrland | N | 40.4 | 2.4 | 75,990 | 37.6 | 11.1 | 9.0 | 8.2 | 7.1 | 6.8 | 6.1 | 4.8 | 5.2 | 2.5 | 1.5 | 0.2 |
| Västmanland | S | 45.0 | 2.7 | 84,447 | 29.8 | 16.6 | 14.3 | 8.2 | 7.6 | 6.9 | 4.6 | 4.1 | 4.2 | 2.5 | 1.2 | 0.1 |
| Västra Götaland | G | 46.5 | 17.3 | 547,275 | 24.3 | 18.1 | 13.2 | 11.9 | 7.5 | 5.7 | 5.4 | 5.1 | 3.1 | 3.3 | 2.1 | 0.2 |
| Örebro | S | 45.4 | 3.0 | 95,477 | 31.2 | 13.8 | 11.0 | 9.9 | 6.8 | 6.4 | 4.6 | 6.1 | 3.5 | 4.5 | 2.1 | 0.1 |
| Östergötland | G | 45.2 | 4.6 | 145,518 | 25.8 | 17.0 | 10.5 | 12.1 | 8.1 | 4.7 | 9.2 | 4.9 | 3.4 | 2.7 | 1.4 | 0.1 |
| Total | | 45.5 | 100.0 | 3,168,546 | 24.4 | 18.8 | 13.6 | 11.0 | 7.1 | 5.7 | 5.5 | 4.7 | 3.5 | 3.3 | 2.2 | 0.2 |
Source: val.se

=== Percentage share ===
| Location | Land | Turnout | Share | Votes | S | M | FP | MP | PP | V | C | KD | JL | SD | F! | Other |
|---|---|---|---|---|---|---|---|---|---|---|---|---|---|---|---|---|
| Blekinge | G | 40.6 | 1.5 | 46,834 | 13,401 | 7,686 | 5,177 | 3,924 | 3,245 | 2,658 | 2,935 | 1,923 | 1,240 | 3,693 | 927 | 25 |
| Dalarna | S | 41.2 | 2.7 | 87,066 | 26,285 | 11,065 | 10,256 | 7,855 | 6,460 | 6,762 | 5,426 | 3,502 | 4,895 | 2,692 | 1,761 | 107 |
| Gotland | G | 43.9 | 0.6 | 19,717 | 5,151 | 2,967 | 2,002 | 2,315 | 1,381 | 1,087 | 2,841 | 564 | 473 | 266 | 634 | 36 |
| Gävleborg | N | 37.8 | 2.5 | 80,447 | 24,954 | 10,046 | 8,473 | 7,880 | 5,167 | 6,600 | 5,481 | 2,987 | 4,452 | 3,263 | 1,094 | 50 |
| Halland | G | 46.6 | 3.3 | 103,476 | 24,521 | 23,720 | 14,515 | 9,759 | 6,543 | 3,920 | 8,206 | 4,655 | 2,757 | 3,515 | 1,310 | 55 |
| Jämtland | N | 41.3 | 1.3 | 40,674 | 14,112 | 4,099 | 2,666 | 3,748 | 2,397 | 2,715 | 5,698 | 984 | 2,895 | 833 | 482 | 45 |
| Jönköping | G | 45.1 | 3.6 | 112,851 | 28,094 | 17,964 | 11,862 | 9,163 | 6,303 | 5,535 | 7,647 | 17,261 | 4,386 | 3,769 | 797 | 70 |
| Kalmar | G | 43.1 | 2.4 | 77,248 | 22,893 | 11,950 | 7,401 | 6,689 | 5,050 | 4,339 | 8,121 | 4,768 | 2,576 | 2,526 | 774 | 161 |
| Kronoberg | G | 42.6 | 1.8 | 58,072 | 13,863 | 9,969 | 6,133 | 5,157 | 3,689 | 5,480 | 5,040 | 3,457 | 1,867 | 2,755 | 640 | 22 |
| Norrbotten | N | 40.4 | 2.5 | 77,763 | 30,772 | 7,823 | 5,125 | 5,471 | 6,083 | 8,831 | 2,938 | 2,529 | 5,112 | 1,442 | 1,273 | 364 |
| Skåne | G | 43.2 | 12.3 | 390,270 | 86,735 | 89,452 | 56,930 | 37,525 | 28,644 | 15,346 | 17,755 | 13,018 | 7,874 | 25,533 | 10,722 | 736 |
| Stockholm | S | 51.1 | 23.4 | 742,301 | 123,503 | 184,483 | 134,485 | 102,491 | 52,774 | 36,393 | 22,231 | 27,235 | 18,600 | 13,891 | 24,370 | 1,845 |
| Södermanland | S | 44.1 | 2.8 | 87,958 | 25,738 | 15,430 | 11,320 | 9,476 | 5,875 | 4,391 | 4,822 | 3,681 | 3,080 | 2,454 | 1,522 | 169 |
| Uppsala | S | 48.3 | 3.8 | 119,531 | 25,133 | 21,049 | 19,117 | 15,595 | 8,644 | 6,775 | 7,274 | 5,494 | 4,474 | 2,609 | 3,208 | 159 |
| Värmland | S | 40.7 | 2.7 | 85,173 | 26,533 | 12,634 | 10,063 | 7,812 | 5,480 | 5,525 | 6,428 | 3,520 | 3,161 | 2,829 | 1,034 | 154 |
| Västerbotten | N | 45.5 | 2.9 | 90,458 | 27,591 | 6,984 | 7,838 | 9,015 | 7,133 | 7,598 | 4,636 | 4,425 | 11,643 | 1,186 | 2,004 | 405 |
| Västernorrland | N | 40.4 | 2.4 | 75,990 | 28,544 | 8,446 | 6,838 | 6,245 | 5,372 | 5,136 | 4,673 | 3,611 | 3,989 | 1,865 | 1,152 | 119 |
| Västmanland | S | 45.0 | 2.7 | 84,447 | 25,161 | 13,985 | 12,061 | 6,915 | 6,403 | 5,832 | 3,908 | 3,448 | 3,552 | 2,082 | 993 | 107 |
| Västra Götaland | G | 46.5 | 17.3 | 547,275 | 133,203 | 98,973 | 72,355 | 65,093 | 40,995 | 31,211 | 29,630 | 28,112 | 16,951 | 18,094 | 11,759 | 899 |
| Örebro | S | 45.4 | 3.0 | 95,477 | 29,748 | 13,182 | 10,507 | 9,427 | 6,512 | 6,146 | 4,368 | 5,826 | 3,372 | 4,328 | 1,961 | 100 |
| Östergötland | G | 45.2 | 4.6 | 145,518 | 37,578 | 24,803 | 15,261 | 17,559 | 11,765 | 6,902 | 13,356 | 7,141 | 5,006 | 3,959 | 2,017 | 171 |
| Total | | 45.5 | 100.0 | 3,168,546 | 773,513 | 596,710 | 430,385 | 349,114 | 225,915 | 179,182 | 173,414 | 148,141 | 112,355 | 103,584 | 70,434 | 5,799 |
Source: val.se

== Municipal results ==
=== Blekinge ===
| Location | Turnout | Share | Votes | S | M | FP | MP | PP | V | C | KD | JL | SD | F! | Other |
|---|---|---|---|---|---|---|---|---|---|---|---|---|---|---|---|
| Karlshamn | 30.5 | 19.8 | 9,250 | 29.1 | 15.6 | 10.7 | 9.8 | 7.4 | 6.2 | 5.4 | 4.0 | 2.5 | 7.4 | 2.0 | 0.1 |
| Karlskrona | 44.0 | 43.9 | 20,574 | 27.5 | 17.5 | 12.4 | 8.9 | 6.5 | 4.7 | 5.9 | 4.3 | 2.7 | 7.4 | 1.9 | 0.0 |
| Olofström | 37.0 | 7.8 | 3,658 | 38.4 | 10.4 | 8.7 | 5.8 | 6.6 | 7.4 | 6.2 | 4.3 | 3.1 | 8.1 | 0.8 | 0.1 |
| Ronneby | 40.2 | 18.7 | 8,770 | 26.1 | 15.4 | 10.2 | 8.0 | 7.7 | 6.4 | 8.6 | 3.5 | 2.9 | 8.4 | 2.7 | 0.1 |
| Sölvesborg | 35.5 | 9.8 | 4,582 | 29.7 | 19.7 | 9.1 | 5.7 | 6.8 | 5.9 | 5.2 | 4.4 | 1.8 | 9.8 | 1.8 | 0.0 |
| Total | 40.6 | 1.5 | 46,834 | 28.6 | 16.4 | 11.1 | 8.4 | 6.9 | 5.7 | 6.3 | 4.1 | 2.6 | 7.9 | 2.0 | 0.1 |
Source: val.se

=== Dalarna ===
| Location | Turnout | Share | Votes | S | M | FP | MP | PP | V | C | KD | JL | SD | F! | Other |
|---|---|---|---|---|---|---|---|---|---|---|---|---|---|---|---|
| Avesta | 49.7 | 9.5 | 8,290 | 36.6 | 10.8 | 9.7 | 8.3 | 7.9 | 7.3 | 6.5 | 3.5 | 5.3 | 3.5 | 0.8 | 0.1 |
| Borlänge | 41.7 | 17.1 | 14,891 | 33.7 | 12.3 | 10.2 | 8.1 | 8.9 | 8.0 | 4.3 | 3.4 | 4.8 | 4.0 | 2.1 | 0.3 |
| Falun | 45.0 | 21.9 | 19,033 | 24.1 | 15.7 | 13.8 | 12.6 | 7.2 | 6.7 | 5.3 | 4.4 | 4.8 | 2.4 | 3.0 | 0.1 |
| Gagnef | 41.4 | 3.6 | 3,121 | 29.0 | 10.4 | 10.5 | 8.8 | 7.0 | 7.3 | 10.8 | 5.1 | 6.2 | 3.5 | 1.4 | 0.0 |
| Hedemora | 37.9 | 5.1 | 4,474 | 28.2 | 11.5 | 8.5 | 9.7 | 7.4 | 7.6 | 10.3 | 4.3 | 5.9 | 3.3 | 2.9 | 0.3 |
| Leksand | 44.9 | 6.2 | 5,393 | 24.4 | 15.7 | 14.0 | 9.2 | 5.9 | 5.7 | 7.9 | 7.1 | 6.1 | 1.8 | 2.1 | 0.2 |
| Ludvika | 37.1 | 8.5 | 7,368 | 37.2 | 10.8 | 10.0 | 7.4 | 7.7 | 9.8 | 3.2 | 3.2 | 5.4 | 3.5 | 1.8 | 0.1 |
| Malung-Sälen | 39.6 | 3.6 | 3,159 | 29.1 | 12.9 | 17.4 | 4.6 | 5.3 | 14.6 | 6.1 | 2.2 | 4.4 | 2.7 | 0.5 | 0.1 |
| Mora | 36.7 | 6.6 | 5,764 | 25.3 | 12.7 | 15.4 | 8.5 | 8.7 | 7.3 | 6.0 | 3.2 | 8.5 | 2.7 | 1.8 | 0.0 |
| Orsa | 39.2 | 2.4 | 2,104 | 25.6 | 10.6 | 11.9 | 9.6 | 10.2 | 6.0 | 6.1 | 4.4 | 7.6 | 5.3 | 2.8 | 0.0 |
| Rättvik | | | | | | | | | | | | | | | |
| Smedjebacken | | | | | | | | | | | | | | | |
| Säter | | | | | | | | | | | | | | | |
| Vansbro | | | | | | | | | | | | | | | |
| Älvdalen | | | | | | | | | | | | | | | |
| Total | 41.2 | 2.7 | 87,066 | 30.2 | 12.7 | 11.8 | 9.0 | 7.4 | 7.8 | 6.2 | 4.0 | 5.6 | 3.1 | 2.0 | 0.1 |
Source: val.se

=== Gotland ===
| Location | Turnout | Share | Votes | S | M | FP | MP | PP | V | C | KD | JL | SD | F! | Other |
|---|---|---|---|---|---|---|---|---|---|---|---|---|---|---|---|
| Gotland | 43.6 | 100.0 | 19,717 | 26.1 | 15.0 | 10.2 | 11.7 | 7.0 | 5.5 | 14.4 | 2.9 | 2.4 | 1.3 | 3.2 | 0.2 |
| Total | 43.9 | 0.6 | 19,717 | 26.1 | 15.0 | 10.2 | 11.7 | 7.0 | 5.5 | 14.4 | 2.9 | 2.4 | 1.3 | 3.2 | 0.2 |
Source: val.se

=== Gävleborg ===
| Location | Turnout | Share | Votes | S | M | FP | MP | PP | V | C | KD | JL | SD | F! | Other |
|---|---|---|---|---|---|---|---|---|---|---|---|---|---|---|---|
| Bollnäs | 33.9 | 8.6 | 6,945 | 32.2 | 10.2 | 10.4 | 8.1 | 5.8 | 7.0 | 10.6 | 4.4 | 6.5 | 3.6 | 1.0 | 0.2 |
| Gävle | 41.5 | 36.8 | 29,609 | 27.8 | 15.6 | 13.2 | 12.1 | 7.4 | 7.4 | 3.2 | 3.0 | 4.2 | 4.5 | 1.6 | 0.1 |
| Hofors | 39.5 | 3.7 | 2,976 | 44.2 | 8.1 | 8.1 | 5.6 | 5.3 | 12.1 | 4.1 | 2.2 | 4.1 | 4.7 | 1.4 | 0.0 |
| Hudiksvall | 38.1 | 13.5 | 10,889 | 29.6 | 12.0 | 7.6 | 11.3 | 5.6 | 8.3 | 11.0 | 4.1 | 6.2 | 3.0 | 1.3 | 0.1 |
| Ljusdal | 32.5 | 6.0 | 4,806 | 27.2 | 12.6 | 9.5 | 8.2 | 5.9 | 7.9 | 10.2 | 3.0 | 10.0 | 4.1 | 1.3 | 0.1 |
| Nordanstig | 34.9 | 3.3 | 2,616 | 29.4 | 7.9 | 8.2 | 8.5 | 5.0 | 9.5 | 13.0 | 5.6 | 6.9 | 4.6 | 1.4 | 0.0 |
| Ockelbo | 34.4 | 2.0 | 1,622 | 35.1 | 10.0 | 7.4 | 9.1 | 4.3 | 11.8 | 10.0 | 2.6 | 4.9 | 3.8 | 0.8 | 0.0 |
| Ovanåker | 32.6 | 3.7 | 2,988 | 30.9 | 7.7 | 9.8 | 6.2 | 4.7 | 5.7 | 15.5 | 10.1 | 6.0 | 3.0 | 0.5 | 0.0 |
| Sandviken | 38.8 | 13.7 | 11,061 | 35.5 | 11.6 | 10.0 | 7.7 | 7.1 | 9.3 | 4.4 | 3.5 | 5.5 | 3.7 | 1.6 | 0.0 |
| Söderhamn | 34.1 | 8.6 | 6,935 | 35.3 | 10.1 | 8.5 | 7.5 | 5.8 | 9.4 | 7.7 | 3.7 | 6.0 | 4.7 | 1.1 | 0.0 |
| Total | 37.8 | 2.5 | 80,447 | 31.0 | 12.5 | 10.5 | 9.8 | 6.4 | 8.2 | 6.8 | 3.7 | 5.5 | 4.1 | 1.4 | 0.1 |
Source: val.se

=== Halland ===
| Location | Turnout | Share | Votes | S | M | FP | MP | PP | V | C | KD | JL | SD | F! | Other |
|---|---|---|---|---|---|---|---|---|---|---|---|---|---|---|---|
| Falkenberg | 45.4 | 13.5 | 13,919 | 27.9 | 18.0 | 11.9 | 8.5 | 5.7 | 3.7 | 13.1 | 4.0 | 3.2 | 3.2 | 0.9 | 0.1 |
| Halmstad | 46.7 | 31.3 | 32,348 | 28.0 | 21.2 | 13.5 | 10.2 | 6.5 | 4.1 | 4.9 | 4.4 | 2.4 | 3.4 | 1.3 | 0.0 |
| Hylte | 39.9 | 2.8 | 2,933 | 32.7 | 14.5 | 11.0 | 6.9 | 5.1 | 3.5 | 13.4 | 4.5 | 2.8 | 4.7 | 0.7 | 0.1 |
| Kungsbacka | 48.9 | 25.3 | 26,227 | 13.8 | 31.9 | 17.8 | 9.6 | 7.2 | 2.5 | 5.6 | 4.9 | 2.7 | 2.4 | 1.5 | 0.0 |
| Laholm | 42.2 | 7.2 | 7,493 | 21.5 | 19.6 | 12.6 | 7.6 | 5.6 | 4.2 | 13.9 | 4.8 | 2.4 | 6.1 | 1.7 | 0.2 |
| Varberg | 47.6 | 19.9 | 20,556 | 26.2 | 20.0 | 12.3 | 9.8 | 5.7 | 4.9 | 9.2 | 4.3 | 2.8 | 3.6 | 1.0 | 0.1 |
| Total | 46.6 | 3.3 | 103,476 | 23.7 | 22.9 | 14.0 | 9.4 | 6.3 | 3.8 | 7.9 | 4.5 | 2.7 | 3.4 | 1.3 | 0.1 |
Source: val.se

=== Jämtland ===
| Location | Turnout | Share | Votes | S | M | FP | MP | PP | V | C | KD | JL | SD | F! | Other |
|---|---|---|---|---|---|---|---|---|---|---|---|---|---|---|---|
| Berg | 37.3 | 5.4 | 2,186 | 32.5 | 7.8 | 5.3 | 6.5 | 5.1 | 7.7 | 17.8 | 2.0 | 11.7 | 3.0 | 0.7 | 0.0 |
| Bräcke | 39.3 | 5.1 | 2,082 | 44.9 | 9.0 | 4.9 | 5.0 | 5.8 | 7.0 | 12.8 | 1.0 | 7.3 | 1.6 | 0.5 | 0.2 |
| Härjedalen | 35.9 | 7.5 | 3,033 | 42.0 | 9.8 | 6.8 | 5.9 | 4.4 | 6.4 | 9.8 | 2.3 | 7.2 | 4.4 | 0.9 | 0.1 |
| Krokom | 42.4 | 11.2 | 4,540 | 30.7 | 7.9 | 5.6 | 8.6 | 5.0 | 6.9 | 23.4 | 2.6 | 6.1 | 1.9 | 1.2 | 0.1 |
| Ragunda | 34.7 | 3.8 | 1,550 | 42.9 | 5.6 | 4.1 | 5.3 | 4.4 | 9.0 | 15.0 | 0.9 | 8.3 | 3.2 | 1.2 | 0.1 |
| Strömsund | 36.4 | 8.7 | 3,554 | 45.6 | 5.8 | 3.8 | 4.1 | 5.6 | 7.6 | 11.4 | 2.2 | 10.7 | 2.6 | 0.6 | 0.1 |
| Åre | 43.9 | 8.4 | 3,405 | 27.5 | 13.0 | 9.1 | 12.2 | 6.3 | 4.7 | 15.5 | 3.3 | 6.0 | 1.2 | 1.1 | 0.1 |
| Östersund | 44.0 | 50.0 | 20,324 | 32.4 | 11.5 | 7.3 | 11.3 | 6.5 | 6.5 | 12.4 | 2.6 | 6.3 | 1.6 | 1.5 | 0.1 |
| Total | 41.3 | 1.3 | 40,674 | 34.7 | 10.1 | 6.6 | 9.2 | 5.9 | 6.7 | 14.0 | 2.4 | 7.1 | 2.0 | 1.2 | 0.1 |
Source: val.se

=== Jönköping ===
| Location | Turnout | Share | Votes | S | M | FP | MP | PP | V | C | KD | JL | SD | F! | Other |
|---|---|---|---|---|---|---|---|---|---|---|---|---|---|---|---|
| Aneby | 42.1 | 1.8 | 2,053 | 22.6 | 10.6 | 10.7 | 7.2 | 4.2 | 3.7 | 12.9 | 18.7 | 3.0 | 5.8 | 0.4 | 0.1 |
| Eksjö | 41.4 | 4.6 | 5,203 | 21.3 | 17.3 | 11.0 | 9.0 | 5.4 | 3.9 | 11.9 | 13.0 | 3.1 | 3.2 | 0.8 | 0.0 |
| Gislaved | 41.0 | 7.7 | 8,698 | 31.8 | 17.7 | 10.0 | 6.0 | 5.3 | 3.4 | 9.7 | 8.9 | 3.6 | 3.2 | 0.5 | 0.1 |
| Gnosjö | 44.2 | 2.6 | 2,986 | 25.1 | 16.2 | 11.2 | 4.6 | 4.6 | 2.9 | 5.6 | 22.2 | 4.3 | 2.7 | 0.5 | 0.1 |
| Habo | 50.7 | 3.4 | 3,831 | 22.2 | 17.8 | 10.1 | 7.9 | 5.2 | 4.5 | 4.6 | 19.5 | 4.7 | 2.9 | 0.5 | 0.1 |
| Jönköping | 48.9 | 41.1 | 46,354 | 23.6 | 16.4 | 11.1 | 9.8 | 6.0 | 5.1 | 4.2 | 16.3 | 4.0 | 2.4 | 0.9 | 0.1 |
| Mullsjö | 48.3 | 2.2 | 2,504 | 23.6 | 14.2 | 9.9 | 8.0 | 5.9 | 4.0 | 4.3 | 22.9 | 3.6 | 2.5 | 1.0 | 0.0 |
| Nässjö | 41.4 | 8.0 | 9,060 | 27.9 | 14.5 | 9.0 | 7.8 | 6.7 | 5.5 | 7.1 | 13.1 | 3.0 | 4.9 | 0.5 | 0.0 |
| Sävsjö | 41.9 | 3.0 | 3,346 | 18.4 | 14.2 | 8.1 | 5.4 | 5.1 | 5.2 | 11.2 | 20.1 | 4.3 | 7.6 | 0.4 | 0.0 |
| Tranås | 42.9 | 5.2 | 5,898 | 26.5 | 15.9 | 10.3 | 9.3 | 5.1 | 5.8 | 6.2 | 12.1 | 3.9 | 4.0 | 1.0 | 0.0 |
| Vaggeryd | 45.6 | 3.8 | 4,333 | 29.4 | 13.1 | 8.8 | 5.8 | 4.4 | 4.8 | 7.2 | 17.2 | 4.8 | 3.8 | 0.5 | 0.1 |
| Vetlanda | 37.0 | 6.5 | 7,298 | 22.8 | 15.6 | 10.3 | 6.5 | 5.4 | 5.7 | 10.8 | 13.3 | 4.9 | 4.2 | 0.5 | 0.1 |
| Värnamo | 46.3 | 10.0 | 11,287 | 27.0 | 15.4 | 11.0 | 6.1 | 4.8 | 5.1 | 9.0 | 14.1 | 3.3 | 3.7 | 0.4 | 0.0 |
| Total | 45.1 | 3.6 | 112,851 | 24.9 | 15.9 | 10.5 | 8.1 | 5.6 | 4.9 | 6.8 | 15.3 | 3.9 | 3.4 | 0.7 | 0.1 |
Source: val.se

=== Kalmar ===
| Location | Turnout | Share | Votes | S | M | FP | MP | PP | V | C | KD | JL | SD | F! | Other |
|---|---|---|---|---|---|---|---|---|---|---|---|---|---|---|---|
| Borgholm | 54.3 | 5.9 | 4,589 | 22.2 | 17.7 | 11.0 | 8.0 | 4.6 | 4.0 | 18.9 | 6.0 | 2.9 | 3.2 | 1.4 | 0.1 |
| Emmaboda | 42.0 | 3.8 | 2,969 | 36.2 | 12.1 | 6.6 | 7.4 | 5.9 | 6.9 | 11.5 | 5.1 | 3.9 | 3.3 | 0.9 | 0.1 |
| Hultsfred | 36.0 | 5.0 | 3,832 | 33.1 | 11.0 | 7.1 | 6.6 | 5.7 | 6.3 | 12.6 | 8.3 | 4.8 | 3.3 | 0.9 | 0.3 |
| Högsby | 36.1 | 2.1 | 1,599 | 32.0 | 12.4 | 7.7 | 6.9 | 7.9 | 5.5 | 12.7 | 7.4 | 2.0 | 4.9 | 0.4 | 0.2 |
| Kalmar | 46.3 | 28.6 | 22,093 | 27.8 | 17.8 | 10.7 | 11.6 | 7.5 | 5.3 | 6.8 | 5.4 | 2.7 | 3.0 | 1.4 | 0.1 |
| Mönsterås | 38.1 | 4.9 | 3,785 | 34.1 | 11.5 | 8.2 | 6.9 | 6.1 | 5.3 | 13.5 | 6.2 | 3.4 | 4.3 | 0.6 | 0.1 |
| Mörbylånga | 61.3 | 8.1 | 6,290 | 30.5 | 16.6 | 9.8 | 8.2 | 6.4 | 3.8 | 13.1 | 4.9 | 2.5 | 2.8 | 1.2 | 0.1 |
| Nybro | 42.6 | 8.3 | 6,416 | 34.1 | 12.5 | 7.5 | 5.9 | 6.8 | 8.2 | 11.1 | 6.8 | 3.5 | 2.8 | 0.6 | 0.1 |
| Oskarshamn | 37.5 | 9.7 | 7,516 | 31.9 | 16.0 | 10.7 | 6.9 | 6.6 | 6.6 | 5.6 | 8.1 | 3.3 | 3.7 | 0.5 | 0.1 |
| Torsås | 38.8 | 2.7 | 2,100 | 27.1 | 13.6 | 9.6 | 6.9 | 6.1 | 4.0 | 17.9 | 7.7 | 3.6 | 2.9 | 0.7 | 0.0 |
| Vimmerby | 37.8 | 5.8 | 4,466 | 27.8 | 12.0 | 7.7 | 7.1 | 5.4 | 5.2 | 14.7 | 9.6 | 5.4 | 3.6 | 0.4 | 0.9 |
| Västervik | 40.8 | 15.0 | 11,593 | 28.2 | 16.6 | 10.2 | 8.9 | 6.2 | 5.8 | 10.6 | 4.5 | 3.7 | 3.5 | 1.0 | 0.6 |
| Total | 43.1 | 2.4 | 77,248 | 29.6 | 15.5 | 9.6 | 8.7 | 6.5 | 5.6 | 10.5 | 6.2 | 3.3 | 3.3 | 1.0 | 0.2 |
Source: val.se

=== Kronoberg ===
| Location | Turnout | Share | Votes | S | M | FP | MP | PP | V | C | KD | JL | SD | F! | Other |
|---|---|---|---|---|---|---|---|---|---|---|---|---|---|---|---|
| Alvesta | 39.6 | 9.4 | 5,483 | 25.1 | 15.7 | 8.6 | 7.6 | 5.6 | 10.7 | 11.2 | 5.2 | 3.8 | 6.1 | 0.4 | 0.1 |
| Lessebo | 39.1 | 4.0 | 2,294 | 35.7 | 12.5 | 8.1 | 7.2 | 6.2 | 11.8 | 6.7 | 2.7 | 3.6 | 4.9 | 0.6 | 0.0 |
| Ljungby | 39.2 | 13.9 | 8,088 | 25.0 | 15.6 | 10.5 | 7.3 | 6.3 | 7.2 | 10.2 | 8.4 | 3.4 | 4.8 | 1.3 | 0.0 |
| Markaryd | 36.0 | 4.4 | 2,556 | 27.3 | 13.3 | 7.9 | 5.0 | 7.9 | 3.9 | 8.8 | 11.6 | 5.4 | 8.3 | 0.7 | 0.0 |
| Tingsryd | 34.0 | 5.6 | 3,242 | 22.8 | 17.3 | 7.9 | 6.8 | 5.2 | 7.1 | 17.0 | 5.6 | 4.0 | 5.5 | 0.9 | 0.1 |
| Uppvidinge | 39.3 | 4.6 | 2,660 | 26.0 | 12.7 | 8.8 | 6.0 | 6.1 | 8.8 | 13.0 | 4.8 | 5.1 | 8.1 | 0.5 | 0.1 |
| Växjö | 47.7 | 50.0 | 29,047 | 21.5 | 18.9 | 11.9 | 10.7 | 6.6 | 11.1 | 6.5 | 5.3 | 2.6 | 3.6 | 1.3 | 0.0 |
| Älmhult | 40.6 | 8.1 | 4,702 | 27.4 | 17.9 | 10.3 | 7.8 | 5.8 | 5.5 | 9.3 | 6.1 | 2.8 | 5.8 | 1.1 | 0.0 |
| Total | 42.6 | 1.8 | 58,072 | 23.9 | 17.2 | 10.6 | 8.9 | 6.4 | 9.4 | 8.7 | 6.0 | 3.2 | 4.7 | 1.1 | 0.0 |
Source: val.se

=== Norrbotten ===
| Location | Turnout | Share | Votes | S | M | FP | MP | PP | V | C | KD | JL | SD | F! | Other |
|---|---|---|---|---|---|---|---|---|---|---|---|---|---|---|---|
| Arjeplog | 38.7 | 1.2 | 958 | 34.4 | 6.9 | 8.0 | 5.4 | 7.7 | 17.2 | 4.5 | 2.8 | 10.0 | 2.6 | 0.3 | 0.0 |
| Arvidsjaur | 41.6 | 2.8 | 2,212 | 43.0 | 7.4 | 6.6 | 3.8 | 7.6 | 15.4 | 4.5 | 1.3 | 7.2 | 2.2 | 0.7 | 0.2 |
| Boden | 43.0 | 11.8 | 9,212 | 38.9 | 13.2 | 7.8 | 5.7 | 7.9 | 10.1 | 2.7 | 3.4 | 6.2 | 2.5 | 1.4 | 0.2 |
| Gällivare | 32.5 | 6.2 | 4,803 | 42.9 | 9.4 | 4.0 | 4.4 | 7.6 | 17.4 | 1.2 | 2.3 | 7.3 | 2.3 | 0.8 | 0.3 |
| Haparanda | 28.6 | 2.4 | 1,848 | 39.6 | 14.2 | 4.5 | 4.9 | 7.7 | 7.3 | 9.2 | 3.7 | 6.9 | 1.2 | 0.9 | 0.1 |
| Jokkmokk | 37.7 | 2.0 | 1,573 | 39.2 | 6.8 | 5.8 | 9.2 | 7.9 | 14.4 | 2.5 | 1.9 | 9.0 | 1.8 | 1.3 | 0.0 |
| Kalix | 37.4 | 6.4 | 4,943 | 49.1 | 8.8 | 6.7 | 6.7 | 5.3 | 8.3 | 4.0 | 2.5 | 6.2 | 1.8 | 0.5 | 0.1 |
| Kiruna | 32.0 | 7.3 | 5,671 | 36.1 | 6.9 | 4.3 | 7.2 | 8.7 | 17.3 | 1.7 | 3.3 | 7.0 | 3.8 | 1.9 | 1.8 |
| Luleå | 44.6 | 32.4 | 25,199 | 35.2 | 12.5 | 8.3 | 9.9 | 9.4 | 9.3 | 3.6 | 3.1 | 4.4 | 1.5 | 2.2 | 0.7 |
| Pajala | 33.8 | 2.2 | 1,709 | 38.3 | 7.3 | 3.3 | 3.6 | 4.2 | 24.2 | 3.9 | 5.1 | 6.7 | 1.6 | 1.1 | 0.6 |
| Piteå | 46.3 | 19.0 | 14,809 | 43.8 | 7.7 | 6.0 | 6.2 | 6.6 | 9.2 | 3.9 | 3.9 | 9.5 | 1.1 | 2.1 | 0.2 |
| Älvsbyn | 36.9 | 3.1 | 2,447 | 38.9 | 5.8 | 5.7 | 3.4 | 8.4 | 15.7 | 5.2 | 4.5 | 8.7 | 3.1 | 0.8 | 0.0 |
| Överkalix | 38.1 | 1.5 | 1,128 | 53.4 | 4.8 | 3.3 | 3.0 | 4.5 | 13.9 | 8.6 | 1.7 | 4.5 | 1.5 | 0.7 | 0.1 |
| Övertorneå | 34.9 | 1.6 | 1,251 | 36.7 | 9.5 | 3.9 | 4.0 | 4.4 | 12.9 | 17.1 | 4.6 | 4.8 | 1.7 | 0.3 | 0.1 |
| Total | 40.4 | 2.5 | 77,763 | 39.6 | 10.1 | 6.6 | 7.0 | 7.8 | 11.4 | 3.8 | 3.3 | 6.6 | 1.9 | 1.6 | 0.5 |
Source: val.se

=== Skåne ===
| Location | Turnout | Share | Votes | S | M | FP | MP | PP | V | C | KD | JL | SD | F! | Other |
|---|---|---|---|---|---|---|---|---|---|---|---|---|---|---|---|
| Bjuv | 32.8 | 0.8 | 3,317 | 37.1 | 16.0 | 9.3 | 4.9 | 8.1 | 3.5 | 4.6 | 3.0 | 2.5 | 9.8 | 1.1 | 0.2 |
| Bromölla | 34.2 | 0.8 | 3,153 | 36.4 | 12.8 | 8.7 | 5.2 | 7.5 | 6.9 | 4.3 | 3.0 | 2.1 | 11.3 | 1.5 | 0.2 |
| Burlöv | 39.7 | 1.2 | 4,533 | 31.1 | 18.9 | 11.5 | 7.8 | 7.3 | 4.3 | 2.6 | 2.4 | 2.2 | 9.4 | 2.1 | 0.2 |
| Båstad | 46.1 | 1.3 | 5,246 | 11.3 | 36.5 | 17.0 | 8.3 | 4.6 | 1.6 | 8.6 | 4.4 | 1.8 | 3.8 | 2.1 | 0.1 |
| Eslöv | 39.2 | 2.3 | 8,839 | 30.0 | 17.1 | 10.5 | 8.1 | 7.9 | 3.5 | 7.9 | 2.5 | 2.5 | 8.6 | 1.2 | 0.1 |
| Helsingborg | 42.7 | 10.5 | 40,946 | 22.7 | 24.9 | 15.2 | 8.7 | 7.6 | 3.1 | 2.7 | 3.6 | 2.1 | 6.9 | 2.3 | 0.2 |
| Hässleholm | 39.6 | 3.8 | 14,807 | 23.6 | 17.7 | 10.6 | 8.2 | 6.3 | 3.7 | 8.8 | 7.4 | 2.6 | 9.4 | 1.6 | 0.1 |
| Höganäs | 48.5 | 2.3 | 8,982 | 17.6 | 30.7 | 19.1 | 7.9 | 5.9 | 2.3 | 4.2 | 5.3 | 1.8 | 4.2 | 1.0 | 0.1 |
| Hörby | 36.4 | 1.0 | 3,979 | 22.5 | 17.1 | 9.7 | 7.2 | 6.3 | 3.2 | 12.2 | 5.4 | 3.5 | 11.3 | 1.6 | 0.1 |
| Höör | 40.1 | 1.1 | 4,447 | 19.9 | 21.9 | 11.3 | 11.2 | 7.5 | 3.9 | 6.8 | 4.4 | 2.8 | 7.8 | 2.3 | 0.1 |
| Klippan | 34.1 | 1.0 | 4,081 | 28.2 | 20.2 | 11.3 | 5.8 | 8.1 | 3.4 | 6.3 | 5.2 | 2.3 | 7.8 | 1.2 | 0.3 |
| Kristianstad | 41.3 | 6.2 | 24,108 | 23.4 | 20.9 | 13.9 | 8.5 | 6.9 | 3.6 | 5.4 | 4.3 | 2.5 | 8.3 | 2.2 | 0.1 |
| Kävlinge | 45.1 | 2.4 | 9,284 | 23.7 | 25.0 | 15.5 | 6.8 | 7.3 | 2.8 | 6.0 | 2.1 | 2.4 | 6.9 | 1.3 | 0.2 |
| Landskrona | 41.5 | 3.1 | 12,162 | 31.2 | 17.8 | 17.3 | 6.1 | 7.5 | 3.9 | 2.5 | 1.7 | 1.8 | 8.9 | 1.3 | 0.2 |
| Lomma | 57.0 | 2.2 | 8,594 | 13.8 | 34.9 | 20.9 | 7.6 | 5.7 | 1.5 | 4.1 | 3.0 | 2.5 | 3.8 | 1.9 | 0.2 |
| Lund | 57.1 | 12.0 | 46,784 | 15.2 | 19.2 | 18.6 | 16.8 | 8.9 | 5.1 | 4.2 | 2.9 | 1.6 | 3.1 | 4.1 | 0.2 |
| Malmö | 43.1 | 23.0 | 90,132 | 22.9 | 21.3 | 14.1 | 11.8 | 7.9 | 5.7 | 2.0 | 2.2 | 1.5 | 5.6 | 4.5 | 0.4 |
| Osby | 37.2 | 0.9 | 3,545 | 29.7 | 12.7 | 10.0 | 6.9 | 5.8 | 4.7 | 8.6 | 6.7 | 2.5 | 11.5 | 1.0 | 0.0 |
| Perstorp | 33.2 | 0.4 | 1,685 | 30.9 | 17.3 | 11.4 | 4.3 | 9.2 | 5.2 | 7.3 | 3.1 | 2.0 | 8.4 | 0.8 | 0.0 |
| Simrishamn | 41.3 | 1.6 | 6,367 | 19.5 | 24.0 | 15.2 | 8.6 | 6.0 | 3.2 | 7.2 | 3.2 | 2.3 | 5.0 | 5.7 | 0.0 |
| Sjöbo | 35.5 | 1.2 | 4,816 | 22.5 | 20.6 | 10.8 | 6.8 | 7.1 | 3.3 | 10.3 | 3.1 | 2.7 | 11.0 | 1.6 | 0.2 |
| Skurup | 38.3 | 1.0 | 4,091 | 23.2 | 22.4 | 12.1 | 6.0 | 8.0 | 3.5 | 8.8 | 2.4 | 2.1 | 9.2 | 2.2 | 0.2 |
| Staffanstorp | 48.4 | 1.9 | 7,556 | 22.7 | 28.1 | 14.9 | 7.0 | 7.3 | 1.9 | 5.0 | 3.1 | 2.1 | 5.7 | 2.0 | 0.1 |
| Svalöv | 39.7 | 1.0 | 3,792 | 25.6 | 17.8 | 9.5 | 7.8 | 7.4 | 2.8 | 13.6 | 2.8 | 2.1 | 9.1 | 1.4 | 0.1 |
| Svedala | 40.8 | 1.5 | 5,668 | 24.5 | 24.0 | 14.6 | 6.0 | 7.2 | 2.9 | 5.6 | 2.5 | 2.3 | 8.9 | 1.4 | 0.2 |
| Tomelilla | 33.8 | 0.8 | 3,295 | 22.5 | 18.8 | 11.2 | 8.6 | 6.8 | 2.8 | 11.8 | 2.3 | 2.0 | 9.5 | 3.5 | 0.2 |
| Trelleborg | 38.7 | 3.1 | 11,913 | 28.6 | 21.9 | 12.4 | 6.4 | 6.3 | 3.0 | 4.8 | 3.1 | 2.1 | 10.0 | 1.3 | 0.1 |
| Vellinge | 50.6 | 3.2 | 12,437 | 9.6 | 46.7 | 19.3 | 4.6 | 4.6 | 0.9 | 3.5 | 3.1 | 1.8 | 4.7 | 1.3 | 0.1 |
| Ystad | 40.7 | 2.3 | 8,990 | 25.0 | 25.0 | 14.0 | 7.5 | 6.7 | 2.6 | 6.0 | 2.4 | 2.4 | 5.9 | 2.5 | 0.1 |
| Åstorp | 33.4 | 0.9 | 3,359 | 34.6 | 18.7 | 8.7 | 5.1 | 9.2 | 4.3 | 4.9 | 3.4 | 2.1 | 7.7 | 1.3 | 0.2 |
| Ängelholm | 43.3 | 3.3 | 12,989 | 18.4 | 32.2 | 13.6 | 8.7 | 6.2 | 2.6 | 4.9 | 4.4 | 2.3 | 5.0 | 1.8 | 0.1 |
| Örkelljunga | 36.8 | 0.7 | 2,597 | 20.7 | 19.3 | 13.3 | 5.7 | 6.3 | 2.2 | 6.4 | 14.0 | 2.1 | 8.8 | 1.2 | 0.2 |
| Östra Göinge | 37.0 | 1.0 | 3,773 | 31.6 | 14.6 | 8.8 | 6.7 | 6.2 | 4.2 | 7.3 | 6.2 | 2.8 | 10.0 | 1.4 | 0.1 |
| Total | 43.2 | 12.3 | 390,270 | 22.2 | 22.9 | 14.6 | 9.6 | 7.3 | 3.9 | 4.5 | 3.3 | 2.0 | 6.5 | 2.7 | 0.2 |
Source: val.se

=== Stockholm ===
| Location | Turnout | Share | Votes | S | M | FP | MP | PP | V | C | KD | JL | SD | F! | Other |
|---|---|---|---|---|---|---|---|---|---|---|---|---|---|---|---|
| Botkyrka | | | | | | | | | | | | | | | |
| Danderyd | | | | | | | | | | | | | | | |
| Ekerö | | | | | | | | | | | | | | | |
| Haninge | | | | | | | | | | | | | | | |
| Huddinge | | | | | | | | | | | | | | | |
| Järfälla | | | | | | | | | | | | | | | |
| Lidingö | | | | | | | | | | | | | | | |
| Nacka | | | | | | | | | | | | | | | |
| Norrtälje | | | | | | | | | | | | | | | |
| Nykvarn | | | | | | | | | | | | | | | |
| Nynäshamn | | | | | | | | | | | | | | | |
| Salem | | | | | | | | | | | | | | | |
| Sigtuna | | | | | | | | | | | | | | | |
| Sollentuna | | | | | | | | | | | | | | | |
| Solna | | | | | | | | | | | | | | | |
| Stockholm | | | | | | | | | | | | | | | |
| Sundbyberg | | | | | | | | | | | | | | | |
| Södertälje | | | | | | | | | | | | | | | |
| Tyresö | | | | | | | | | | | | | | | |
| Täby | | | | | | | | | | | | | | | |
| Upplands-Bro | | | | | | | | | | | | | | | |
| Upplands Väsby | | | | | | | | | | | | | | | |
| Vallentuna | | | | | | | | | | | | | | | |
| Vaxholm | | | | | | | | | | | | | | | |
| Värmdö | | | | | | | | | | | | | | | |
| Österåker | | | | | | | | | | | | | | | |
| Total | 51.1 | 23.4 | 742,301 | 16.6 | 24.9 | 18.1 | 13.8 | 7.1 | 4.9 | 3.0 | 3.7 | 2.5 | 1.9 | 3.3 | 0.2 |
Source: val.se

=== Södermanland ===
| Location | Turnout | Share | Votes | S | M | FP | MP | PP | V | C | KD | JL | SD | F! | Other |
|---|---|---|---|---|---|---|---|---|---|---|---|---|---|---|---|
| Eskilstuna | 41.6 | 32.9 | 28,896 | 31.6 | 16.6 | 12.4 | 11.1 | 7.2 | 5.2 | 4.1 | 3.9 | 2.9 | 3.3 | 1.3 | 0.4 |
| Flen | 44.3 | 6.1 | 5,326 | 33.4 | 15.5 | 10.4 | 9.6 | 5.0 | 5.8 | 7.9 | 3.6 | 4.0 | 3.2 | 1.4 | 0.1 |
| Gnesta | 43.1 | 3.7 | 3,249 | 25.7 | 16.3 | 10.6 | 15.1 | 5.6 | 5.7 | 8.9 | 3.4 | 4.1 | 2.6 | 1.8 | 0.0 |
| Katrineholm | 43.0 | 11.8 | 10,393 | 31.6 | 14.5 | 13.4 | 10.7 | 6.6 | 5.1 | 6.5 | 4.0 | 3.3 | 3.0 | 1.0 | 0.2 |
| Nyköping | 48.2 | 21.3 | 18,717 | 29.0 | 17.3 | 12.7 | 10.5 | 6.2 | 4.3 | 6.3 | 5.0 | 3.9 | 2.2 | 2.5 | 0.1 |
| Oxelösund | 43.0 | 4.2 | 3,704 | 33.9 | 13.5 | 10.8 | 9.6 | 7.3 | 10.1 | 3.4 | 2.9 | 3.6 | 2.2 | 2.6 | 0.1 |
| Strängnäs | 45.6 | 12.3 | 10,777 | 20.6 | 24.1 | 16.5 | 10.2 | 7.3 | 3.9 | 5.4 | 4.7 | 3.4 | 2.3 | 1.5 | 0.1 |
| Trosa | 49.3 | 4.7 | 4,162 | 20.5 | 26.8 | 14.8 | 10.7 | 6.1 | 2.9 | 4.0 | 3.7 | 5.0 | 2.5 | 2.9 | 0.0 |
| Vingåker | 40.8 | 3.1 | 2,734 | 34.3 | 11.9 | 10.0 | 10.6 | 7.0 | 5.1 | 7.5 | 4.4 | 4.8 | 2.9 | 1.4 | 0.1 |
| Total | 44.1 | 2.8 | 87,958 | 29.3 | 17.5 | 12.9 | 10.8 | 6.7 | 5.0 | 5.5 | 4.2 | 3.5 | 2.8 | 1.7 | 0.2 |
Source: val.se

=== Uppsala ===
| Location | Turnout | Share | Votes | S | M | FP | MP | PP | V | C | KD | JL | SD | F! | Other |
|---|---|---|---|---|---|---|---|---|---|---|---|---|---|---|---|
| Enköping | 40.9 | 10.0 | 11,974 | 23.9 | 23.4 | 11.2 | 8.6 | 6.6 | 4.5 | 10.2 | 3.6 | 4.4 | 2.4 | 1.1 | 0.1 |
| Heby | 37.9 | 3.2 | 3,836 | 27.0 | 10.7 | 10.8 | 5.7 | 6.2 | 8.2 | 16.3 | 5.6 | 4.9 | 3.3 | 1.1 | 0.2 |
| Håbo | 42.5 | 4.8 | 5,772 | 20.6 | 25.2 | 16.4 | 9.1 | 8.5 | 4.3 | 3.9 | 3.3 | 3.7 | 3.2 | 1.5 | 0.2 |
| Knivsta | 51.3 | 4.3 | 5,094 | 16.1 | 22.4 | 20.2 | 11.6 | 6.3 | 3.7 | 6.4 | 5.8 | 3.4 | 2.1 | 1.9 | 0.1 |
| Tierp | 38.8 | 5.0 | 5,961 | 37.9 | 9.6 | 10.8 | 7.8 | 5.2 | 7.4 | 9.4 | 3.1 | 4.6 | 3.3 | 0.9 | 0.1 |
| Uppsala | 53.5 | 65.2 | 77,947 | 17.9 | 17.2 | 17.5 | 15.5 | 7.7 | 5.8 | 4.6 | 5.0 | 3.4 | 1.8 | 3.4 | 0.2 |
| Älvkarleby | 39.4 | 2.2 | 2,682 | 43.0 | 8.0 | 10.0 | 7.4 | 5.8 | 10.1 | 2.5 | 2.2 | 5.2 | 5.2 | 0.6 | 0.0 |
| Östhammar | 38.1 | 5.2 | 6,265 | 29.2 | 16.4 | 12.8 | 7.3 | 5.3 | 4.3 | 10.8 | 3.7 | 5.3 | 2.6 | 2.3 | 0.0 |
| Total | 48.3 | 3.8 | 119,531 | 21.0 | 17.6 | 16.0 | 13.0 | 7.2 | 5.7 | 6.1 | 4.6 | 3.7 | 2.2 | 2.7 | 0.1 |
Source: val.se

=== Värmland ===
| Location | Turnout | Share | Votes | S | M | FP | MP | PP | V | C | KD | JL | SD | F! | Other |
|---|---|---|---|---|---|---|---|---|---|---|---|---|---|---|---|
| Arvika | 36.4 | 8.5 | 7,249 | 30.7 | 13.7 | 11.1 | 10.8 | 5.9 | 7.2 | 7.1 | 3.8 | 5.1 | 3.2 | 1.3 | 0.1 |
| Eda | 30.4 | 2.0 | 1,677 | 36.3 | 12.2 | 7.8 | 5.8 | 5.4 | 6.7 | 11.2 | 3.2 | 7.3 | 3.3 | 0.7 | 0.2 |
| Filipstad | 34.8 | 3.4 | 2,899 | 43.8 | 10.9 | 8.3 | 5.8 | 6.6 | 9.6 | 3.5 | 2.6 | 3.9 | 3.9 | 0.9 | 0.2 |
| Forshaga | 38.2 | 3.8 | 3,273 | 40.8 | 10.4 | 9.0 | 7.4 | 6.0 | 6.3 | 6.5 | 3.8 | 3.8 | 4.1 | 1.6 | 0.3 |
| Grums | 37.0 | 3.1 | 2,617 | 43.4 | 11.0 | 7.0 | 6.0 | 6.8 | 7.3 | 7.1 | 3.7 | 3.1 | 3.5 | 0.9 | 0.2 |
| Hagfors | 33.2 | 3.9 | 3,317 | 47.1 | 8.3 | 7.2 | 4.9 | 4.4 | 10.6 | 5.8 | 2.7 | 3.6 | 4.3 | 1.1 | 0.1 |
| Hammarö | 47.5 | 6.0 | 5,145 | 32.1 | 16.6 | 14.1 | 9.6 | 7.2 | 5.4 | 3.9 | 5.1 | 2.8 | 1.9 | 0.9 | 0.1 |
| Karlstad | 47.0 | 36.5 | 31,074 | 26.9 | 17.7 | 13.8 | 11.6 | 7.4 | 5.4 | 5.2 | 4.3 | 2.8 | 3.2 | 1.6 | 0.2 |
| Kil | 40.8 | 4.2 | 3,598 | 28.1 | 15.1 | 11.2 | 10.3 | 6.5 | 5.3 | 10.1 | 5.3 | 4.0 | 3.0 | 1.0 | 0.1 |
| Kristinehamn | 41.7 | 9.1 | 7,729 | 31.4 | 15.9 | 12.9 | 9.4 | 6.2 | 7.2 | 5.6 | 4.0 | 3.3 | 3.2 | 0.7 | 0.2 |
| Munkfors | 38.8 | 1.4 | 1,164 | 47.0 | 5.8 | 8.1 | 5.7 | 5.6 | 9.1 | 8.0 | 2.0 | 3.3 | 4.5 | 1.0 | 0.1 |
| Storfors | 40.1 | 1.6 | 1,322 | 40.2 | 10.4 | 6.2 | 4.2 | 7.0 | 11.2 | 5.7 | 3.3 | 5.1 | 5.1 | 1.1 | 0.4 |
| Sunne | 40.3 | 4.9 | 4,182 | 23.0 | 12.5 | 9.0 | 6.8 | 4.6 | 5.0 | 27.0 | 3.8 | 4.5 | 2.6 | 0.9 | 0.3 |
| Säffle | 35.9 | 5.1 | 4,353 | 26.1 | 15.2 | 13.0 | 6.3 | 5.8 | 5.2 | 13.1 | 5.4 | 4.3 | 4.5 | 0.8 | 0.1 |
| Torsby | 33.4 | 3.8 | 3,269 | 36.0 | 13.1 | 9.0 | 6.5 | 5.4 | 10.3 | 7.5 | 2.4 | 5.3 | 3.5 | 0.9 | 0.2 |
| Årjäng | 34.0 | 2.7 | 2,305 | 26.2 | 12.3 | 14.2 | 5.2 | 4.1 | 5.9 | 13.4 | 7.7 | 7.6 | 3.0 | 0.3 | 0.0 |
| Total | 40.7 | 2.7 | 85,173 | 31.1 | 14.8 | 11.8 | 9.2 | 6.4 | 6.5 | 7.5 | 4.1 | 3.7 | 3.3 | 1.2 | 0.2 |
Source: val.se

=== Västerbotten ===
| Location | Turnout | Share | Votes | S | M | FP | MP | PP | V | C | KD | JL | SD | F! | Other |
|---|---|---|---|---|---|---|---|---|---|---|---|---|---|---|---|
| Bjurholm | 40.2 | 0.9 | 785 | 30.6 | 12.4 | 14.4 | 3.3 | 5.1 | 3.1 | 9.0 | 7.3 | 12.6 | 1.1 | 1.0 | 0.1 |
| Dorotea | 35.9 | 0.9 | 832 | 43.0 | 5.9 | 10.7 | 2.2 | 3.8 | 7.2 | 5.4 | 1.8 | 17.4 | 2.3 | 0.1 | 0.1 |
| Lycksele | 37.8 | 4.1 | 3,664 | 34.9 | 7.2 | 8.4 | 3.6 | 5.4 | 8.5 | 3.6 | 8.7 | 17.5 | 1.3 | 0.8 | 0.1 |
| Malå | 34.6 | 1.0 | 888 | 35.8 | 5.1 | 11.3 | 3.7 | 5.6 | 13.7 | 3.0 | 4.3 | 15.3 | 1.7 | 0.3 | 0.2 |
| Nordmaling | 41.5 | 2.6 | 2,347 | 34.4 | 8.2 | 7.5 | 4.6 | 5.3 | 6.2 | 10.5 | 5.1 | 15.3 | 1.5 | 1.2 | 0.2 |
| Norsjö | 34.6 | 1.3 | 1,181 | 35.1 | 3.8 | 6.9 | 3.0 | 5.8 | 10.6 | 6.2 | 8.0 | 18.6 | 1.2 | 0.5 | 0.3 |
| Robertsfors | 42.1 | 2.5 | 2,258 | 29.1 | 5.3 | 5.9 | 6.9 | 6.2 | 6.4 | 16.1 | 7.1 | 14.3 | 1.1 | 1.1 | 0.6 |
| Skellefteå | 45.4 | 27.8 | 25,174 | 38.5 | 6.5 | 7.8 | 6.9 | 6.8 | 9.9 | 4.3 | 5.0 | 11.4 | 1.4 | 1.2 | 0.2 |
| Sorsele | 33.7 | 0.8 | 724 | 31.1 | 6.6 | 5.8 | 5.8 | 5.7 | 8.3 | 7.5 | 4.7 | 22.8 | 1.2 | 0.4 | 0.1 |
| Storuman | 36.5 | 2.0 | 1,815 | 27.2 | 8.5 | 8.4 | 5.3 | 5.1 | 6.3 | 4.8 | 6.4 | 25.2 | 1.9 | 0.8 | 0.0 |
| Umeå | 49.6 | 47.5 | 42,943 | 24.5 | 9.0 | 9.6 | 14.5 | 9.8 | 7.9 | 4.2 | 4.0 | 11.0 | 1.1 | 3.6 | 0.7 |
| Vilhelmina | 41.1 | 2.5 | 2,301 | 34.9 | 3.6 | 5.5 | 3.7 | 5.6 | 9.0 | 6.3 | 5.1 | 23.5 | 2.0 | 0.7 | 0.0 |
| Vindeln | 38.5 | 1.9 | 1,697 | 33.8 | 8.8 | 7.7 | 4.4 | 5.9 | 4.2 | 10.5 | 8.1 | 15.0 | 0.8 | 0.5 | 0.1 |
| Vännäs | 44.7 | 3.1 | 2,825 | 28.5 | 6.0 | 7.6 | 7.4 | 5.5 | 9.6 | 9.0 | 6.2 | 16.8 | 1.4 | 1.4 | 0.5 |
| Åsele | 41.4 | 1.1 | 1,024 | 38.4 | 6.3 | 8.7 | 1.9 | 4.2 | 6.4 | 7.1 | 3.7 | 20.6 | 2.1 | 0.6 | 0.0 |
| Total | 45.5 | 2.9 | 90,458 | 30.5 | 7.7 | 8.7 | 10.0 | 7.9 | 8.4 | 5.1 | 4.9 | 12.9 | 1.3 | 2.2 | 0.4 |
Source: val.se

=== Västernorrland ===
| Location | Turnout | Share | Votes | S | M | FP | MP | PP | V | C | KD | JL | SD | F! | Other |
|---|---|---|---|---|---|---|---|---|---|---|---|---|---|---|---|
| Härnösand | 42.4 | 10.7 | 8,116 | 31.7 | 11.6 | 10.4 | 11.0 | 7.6 | 6.7 | 7.2 | 4.2 | 4.3 | 2.2 | 3.0 | 0.0 |
| Kramfors | 39.3 | 7.9 | 6,025 | 41.6 | 8.3 | 6.3 | 6.3 | 5.6 | 10.5 | 10.1 | 3.5 | 4.9 | 1.7 | 1.0 | 0.1 |
| Sollefteå | 38.5 | 8.1 | 6,181 | 46.1 | 8.3 | 5.8 | 7.5 | 5.2 | 7.7 | 6.7 | 3.2 | 6.3 | 2.5 | 0.7 | 0.1 |
| Sundsvall | 41.5 | 40.1 | 30,449 | 33.5 | 13.6 | 11.0 | 9.5 | 8.3 | 6.5 | 4.2 | 4.0 | 4.4 | 3.0 | 1.7 | 0.3 |
| Timrå | 38.0 | 6.8 | 5,140 | 46.0 | 7.8 | 7.3 | 5.9 | 8.0 | 8.3 | 5.2 | 2.9 | 4.7 | 2.6 | 1.2 | 0.1 |
| Ånge | 34.9 | 3.7 | 2,784 | 44.0 | 8.3 | 5.6 | 5.4 | 6.1 | 8.2 | 7.6 | 3.3 | 6.9 | 3.9 | 0.6 | 0.0 |
| Örnsköldsvik | 40.4 | 22.8 | 17,295 | 39.5 | 9.9 | 8.0 | 6.7 | 5.8 | 4.9 | 7.5 | 8.0 | 6.9 | 1.5 | 1.1 | 0.1 |
| Total | 40.4 | 2.4 | 75,990 | 37.6 | 11.1 | 9.0 | 8.2 | 7.1 | 6.8 | 6.1 | 4.8 | 5.2 | 2.5 | 1.5 | 0.2 |
Source: val.se

=== Västmanland ===
| Location | Turnout | Share | Votes | S | M | FP | MP | PP | V | C | KD | JL | SD | F! | Other |
|---|---|---|---|---|---|---|---|---|---|---|---|---|---|---|---|
| Arboga | | | | | | | | | | | | | | | |
| Fagersta | | | | | | | | | | | | | | | |
| Hallstahammar | | | | | | | | | | | | | | | |
| Kungsör | | | | | | | | | | | | | | | |
| Köping | | | | | | | | | | | | | | | |
| Norberg | | | | | | | | | | | | | | | |
| Sala | | | | | | | | | | | | | | | |
| Skinnskatteberg | | | | | | | | | | | | | | | |
| Surahammar | | | | | | | | | | | | | | | |
| Västerås | | | | | | | | | | | | | | | |
| Total | 45.0 | 2.7 | 84,447 | 29.8 | 16.6 | 14.3 | 8.2 | 7.6 | 6.9 | 4.6 | 4.1 | 4.2 | 2.5 | 1.2 | 0.1 |
Source: val.se

=== Västra Götaland ===
| Location | Turnout | Share | Votes | S | M | FP | MP | PP | V | C | KD | JL | SD | F! | Other |
|---|---|---|---|---|---|---|---|---|---|---|---|---|---|---|---|
| Ale | 42.5 | 1.5 | 8,355 | 29.8 | 14.1 | 11.0 | 9.8 | 9.1 | 6.7 | 4.8 | 4.7 | 3.7 | 4.8 | 1.1 | 0.3 |
| Alingsås | 49.1 | 2.5 | 13,888 | 20.0 | 15.7 | 15.3 | 14.7 | 7.0 | 6.4 | 5.5 | 8.0 | 3.2 | 2.6 | 1.5 | 0.1 |
| Bengtsfors | 33.3 | 0.5 | 2,498 | 27.6 | 11.9 | 9.7 | 8.9 | 5.0 | 7.2 | 8.6 | 5.9 | 11.7 | 1.9 | 1.5 | 0.0 |
| Bollebygd | 46.3 | 0.5 | 2,823 | 22.7 | 20.3 | 11.8 | 10.0 | 7.8 | 6.2 | 5.9 | 5.7 | 3.1 | 5.0 | 1.3 | 0.2 |
| Borås | 46.5 | 6.4 | 35,154 | 28.2 | 18.6 | 12.1 | 9.8 | 7.5 | 5.8 | 4.1 | 5.1 | 3.8 | 3.9 | 1.0 | 0.0 |
| Dals-Ed | 32.1 | 0.2 | 1,096 | 24.1 | 10.3 | 8.9 | 7.2 | 6.8 | 4.2 | 13.2 | 8.9 | 12.9 | 2.8 | 0.7 | 0.0 |
| Essunga | 45.3 | 0.4 | 1,940 | 24.7 | 20.7 | 10.1 | 6.2 | 4.3 | 3.7 | 16.1 | 6.4 | 4.0 | 2.8 | 1.0 | 0.1 |
| Falköping | 43.3 | 1.9 | 10,300 | 25.8 | 15.6 | 10.2 | 8.5 | 5.8 | 5.1 | 12.4 | 8.0 | 3.9 | 4.1 | 0.7 | 0.0 |
| Färgelanda | 38.5 | 0.4 | 1,929 | 28.0 | 11.4 | 8.3 | 5.6 | 5.4 | 4.7 | 18.9 | 4.1 | 6.4 | 5.9 | 0.9 | 0.3 |
| Gothenburg | 49.0 | 34.2 | 187,270 | 20.5 | 19.8 | 13.8 | 15.4 | 8.8 | 6.7 | 2.3 | 4.0 | 2.0 | 3.2 | 3.3 | 0.3 |
| Grästorp | 40.6 | 0.3 | 1,803 | 24.3 | 21.9 | 9.3 | 6.2 | 5.4 | 4.5 | 17.7 | 4.7 | 2.8 | 2.3 | 0.8 | 0.0 |
| Gullspång | 44.1 | 0.3 | 1,822 | 36.8 | 12.2 | 9.1 | 5.7 | 6.0 | 5.0 | 8.5 | 5.0 | 6.6 | 4.1 | 0.9 | 0.1 |
| Götene | 47.9 | 0.9 | 4,714 | 28.4 | 14.5 | 10.3 | 9.2 | 5.2 | 5.7 | 10.6 | 9.3 | 3.2 | 2.7 | 0.8 | 0.1 |
| Herrljunga | 45.6 | 0.6 | 3,185 | 23.1 | 13.6 | 10.9 | 7.4 | 6.9 | 5.6 | 14.5 | 8.3 | 4.6 | 3.5 | 1.6 | 0.0 |
| Hjo | 49.3 | 0.6 | 3,378 | 27.0 | 18.9 | 12.4 | 8.9 | 5.4 | 4.4 | 8.2 | 8.1 | 2.5 | 2.7 | 1.4 | 0.1 |
| Härryda | 50.6 | 2.2 | 12,076 | 19.3 | 21.9 | 17.1 | 12.9 | 8.3 | 4.3 | 4.3 | 4.4 | 2.7 | 2.7 | 1.9 | 0.1 |
| Karlsborg | 41.9 | 0.4 | 2,246 | 28.9 | 15.5 | 12.2 | 7.2 | 5.7 | 3.3 | 10.9 | 6.6 | 4.7 | 3.7 | 1.2 | 0.0 |
| Kungälv | 49.1 | 2.7 | 14,875 | 25.9 | 19.1 | 13.9 | 10.1 | 6.9 | 4.2 | 6.0 | 5.9 | 3.4 | 3.3 | 1.3 | 0.0 |
| Lerum | 50.8 | 2.5 | 13,899 | 18.5 | 20.7 | 18.4 | 13.6 | 6.8 | 4.7 | 4.1 | 5.1 | 2.8 | 2.9 | 2.3 | 0.1 |
| Lidköping | 47.7 | 2.5 | 13,884 | 30.0 | 16.5 | 10.5 | 9.8 | 5.7 | 6.1 | 8.0 | 7.0 | 2.9 | 2.5 | 0.8 | 0.2 |
| Lilla Edet | 37.7 | 0.6 | 3,538 | 32.1 | 10.3 | 9.9 | 8.4 | 7.7 | 8.9 | 6.4 | 3.7 | 4.6 | 5.3 | 2.6 | 0.0 |
| Lysekil | 40.0 | 0.8 | 4,569 | 30.3 | 16.2 | 14.1 | 11.5 | 6.2 | 5.6 | 4.2 | 3.1 | 3.9 | 3.4 | 1.4 | 0.1 |
| Mariestad | 45.8 | 1.5 | 8,423 | 30.7 | 16.0 | 12.1 | 9.7 | 5.8 | 5.7 | 6.3 | 5.3 | 3.9 | 3.5 | 1.0 | 0.0 |
| Mark | 44.6 | 2.0 | 11,188 | 30.6 | 13.6 | 10.6 | 9.8 | 5.9 | 6.0 | 9.1 | 5.7 | 4.1 | 3.5 | 0.9 | 0.1 |
| Mellerud | 37.6 | 0.5 | 2,654 | 23.5 | 15.4 | 9.5 | 7.4 | 5.9 | 5.0 | 15.3 | 6.0 | 6.3 | 3.8 | 1.8 | 0.1 |
| Munkedal | 37.0 | 0.5 | 2,874 | 27.1 | 14.0 | 8.4 | 8.0 | 6.8 | 6.3 | 12.2 | 4.8 | 6.8 | 3.7 | 1.9 | 0.0 |
| Mölndal | 50.1 | 4.1 | 22,292 | 20.3 | 20.1 | 16.3 | 13.0 | 8.7 | 4.8 | 3.5 | 4.6 | 2.8 | 3.4 | 2.4 | 0.1 |
| Orust | 45.3 | 1.0 | 5,401 | 23.2 | 18.1 | 14.7 | 11.2 | 5.6 | 5.4 | 8.4 | 3.6 | 4.8 | 3.2 | 1.8 | 0.0 |
| Partille | 48.6 | 2.2 | 12,032 | 21.3 | 20.7 | 15.9 | 11.3 | 8.3 | 5.0 | 2.8 | 6.1 | 2.9 | 3.2 | 2.3 | 0.1 |
| Skara | 45.6 | 1.2 | 6,424 | 27.0 | 17.6 | 11.0 | 10.0 | 5.6 | 4.8 | 10.9 | 5.2 | 3.0 | 3.1 | 1.7 | 0.1 |
| Skövde | 47.1 | 3.3 | 18,191 | 26.5 | 17.4 | 13.0 | 8.6 | 8.1 | 4.4 | 8.3 | 5.5 | 2.9 | 3.7 | 1.5 | 0.0 |
| Sotenäs | 42.5 | 0.6 | 3,144 | 24.6 | 22.7 | 16.6 | 7.3 | 5.5 | 4.7 | 5.1 | 5.5 | 4.2 | 2.6 | 1.0 | 0.2 |
| Stenungsund | 45.2 | 1.4 | 7,866 | 25.5 | 20.8 | 14.4 | 10.3 | 6.9 | 4.6 | 4.8 | 4.5 | 4.3 | 2.5 | 1.3 | 0.1 |
| Strömstad | 33.7 | 0.5 | 2,745 | 23.1 | 16.5 | 16.2 | 11.8 | 6.4 | 6.8 | 8.6 | 3.7 | 3.8 | 1.8 | 1.2 | 0.1 |
| Svenljunga | 39.6 | 0.6 | 3,035 | 26.7 | 16.7 | 11.0 | 7.1 | 4.9 | 3.8 | 12.5 | 4.9 | 4.9 | 5.9 | 1.6 | 0.0 |
| Tanum | 38.4 | 0.7 | 3,606 | 16.4 | 21.4 | 14.3 | 11.4 | 5.6 | 4.3 | 13.2 | 3.6 | 5.4 | 2.1 | 2.2 | 0.1 |
| Tibro | 42.4 | 0.6 | 3,425 | 32.2 | 12.6 | 12.2 | 7.2 | 5.6 | 4.2 | 8.9 | 9.5 | 3.4 | 3.3 | 0.9 | 0.1 |
| Tidaholm | 45.1 | 0.8 | 4,366 | 40.7 | 10.9 | 8.3 | 7.4 | 5.9 | 5.4 | 8.0 | 5.5 | 3.6 | 3.6 | 0.7 | 0.0 |
| Tjörn | 46.1 | 1.0 | 5,349 | 20.7 | 21.1 | 16.6 | 10.7 | 6.4 | 3.0 | 4.4 | 9.9 | 3.4 | 2.7 | 1.1 | 0.1 |
| Tranemo | 46.4 | 0.7 | 4,049 | 30.3 | 15.2 | 10.1 | 7.5 | 4.4 | 2.8 | 14.4 | 4.3 | 3.6 | 5.4 | 1.7 | 0.2 |
| Trollhättan | 44.1 | 3.2 | 17,703 | 36.9 | 14.1 | 11.7 | 9.5 | 7.5 | 5.4 | 4.4 | 3.3 | 2.8 | 2.5 | 1.8 | 0.1 |
| Töreboda | 39.6 | 0.5 | 2,814 | 29.3 | 14.6 | 10.0 | 6.9 | 5.5 | 5.4 | 13.9 | 4.7 | 4.5 | 3.9 | 1.2 | 0.0 |
| Uddevalla | 44.6 | 3.2 | 17,303 | 28.0 | 15.3 | 12.5 | 10.2 | 6.5 | 5.7 | 4.6 | 5.5 | 4.2 | 4.0 | 3.1 | 0.4 |
| Ulricehamn | 44.9 | 1.4 | 7,705 | 23.6 | 17.8 | 12.3 | 8.9 | 4.9 | 4.1 | 12.3 | 6.6 | 3.3 | 5.3 | 0.9 | 0.0 |
| Vara | 43.2 | 1.0 | 5,234 | 24.7 | 19.4 | 10.4 | 6.4 | 6.3 | 4.6 | 16.1 | 5.5 | 3.1 | 2.4 | 0.9 | 0.1 |
| Vårgårda | 45.7 | 0.7 | 3,664 | 20.5 | 12.2 | 12.3 | 9.8 | 6.5 | 3.8 | 12.5 | 14.6 | 3.8 | 3.2 | 0.8 | 0.1 |
| Vänersborg | 44.8 | 2.3 | 12,609 | 29.5 | 15.1 | 11.7 | 10.0 | 6.5 | 6.5 | 7.6 | 4.8 | 3.3 | 2.8 | 2.2 | 0.1 |
| Åmål | 35.8 | 0.6 | 3,468 | 31.0 | 14.3 | 10.8 | 9.3 | 4.9 | 6.9 | 8.3 | 4.6 | 5.0 | 3.1 | 1.3 | 0.4 |
| Öckerö | 48.6 | 0.8 | 4,469 | 23.2 | 19.8 | 14.9 | 8.1 | 7.0 | 2.8 | 1.6 | 14.9 | 4.1 | 2.1 | 1.5 | 0.1 |
| Total | 46.5 | 17.3 | 547,275 | 24.3 | 18.1 | 13.2 | 11.9 | 7.5 | 5.7 | 5.4 | 5.1 | 3.1 | 3.3 | 2.1 | 0.2 |
Source: val.se

=== Örebro ===
| Location | Turnout | Share | Votes | S | M | FP | MP | PP | V | C | KD | JL | SD | F! | Other |
|---|---|---|---|---|---|---|---|---|---|---|---|---|---|---|---|
| Askersund | | | | | | | | | | | | | | | |
| Degerfors | | | | | | | | | | | | | | | |
| Hallsberg | | | | | | | | | | | | | | | |
| Hällefors | | | | | | | | | | | | | | | |
| Karlskoga | | | | | | | | | | | | | | | |
| Kumla | | | | | | | | | | | | | | | |
| Laxå | | | | | | | | | | | | | | | |
| Lekeberg | | | | | | | | | | | | | | | |
| Lindesberg | | | | | | | | | | | | | | | |
| Ljusnarsberg | | | | | | | | | | | | | | | |
| Nora | | | | | | | | | | | | | | | |
| Örebro | | | | | | | | | | | | | | | |
| Total | 45.4 | 3.0 | 95,477 | 31.2 | 13.8 | 11.0 | 9.9 | 6.8 | 6.4 | 4.6 | 6.1 | 3.5 | 4.5 | 2.1 | 0.1 |
Source: val.se

=== Östergötland ===
| Location | Turnout | Share | Votes | S | M | FP | MP | PP | V | C | KD | JL | SD | F! | Other |
|---|---|---|---|---|---|---|---|---|---|---|---|---|---|---|---|
| Boxholm | | | | | | | | | | | | | | | |
| Finspång | | | | | | | | | | | | | | | |
| Kinda | | | | | | | | | | | | | | | |
| Linköping | | | | | | | | | | | | | | | |
| Mjölby | | | | | | | | | | | | | | | |
| Motala | | | | | | | | | | | | | | | |
| Norrköping | | | | | | | | | | | | | | | |
| Söderköping | | | | | | | | | | | | | | | |
| Vadstena | | | | | | | | | | | | | | | |
| Valdemarsvik | | | | | | | | | | | | | | | |
| Ydre | | | | | | | | | | | | | | | |
| Åtvidaberg | | | | | | | | | | | | | | | |
| Ödeshög | | | | | | | | | | | | | | | |
| Total | 45.2 | 4.6 | 145,518 | 25.8 | 17.0 | 10.5 | 12.1 | 8.1 | 4.7 | 9.2 | 4.9 | 3.4 | 2.7 | 1.4 | 0.1 |
Source: val.se
