= Results of the 2014 European Parliament election in Sweden =

Sweden held its 2014 European Parliament election on the 25 May 2014. the same week as the other 27 countries held their elections.

== Results ==
Party	Votes	%	Seats	+/–
Swedish Social Democratic Party	899,074	24.19	5	–1
Green Party	572,591	15.41	4	+2
Moderate Party	507,488	13.65	3	–1
Liberals	368,514	9.91	2	–1
Sweden Democrats	359,248	9.67	2	+2
Centre Party	241,101	6.49	1	0
Left Party	234,272	6.30	1	0
Christian Democrats	220,574	5.93	1	0
Feminist Initiative	204,005	5.49	1	+1
Pirate Party	82,763	2.23	0	–2
June List	11,629	0.31	0	0
Animals' Party	8,773	0.24	0	New
Classical Liberal Party	492	0.01	0	New
European Workers Party	170	0.00	0	0
Swedish Multi-Democrats	133	0.00	0	New
Sweden out of the EU / Freedom and Justice Party	106	0.00	0	0
Socialist Welfare Party	86	0.00	0	New
True Democracy	72	0.00	0	New
Swedish National Democratic Party	49	0.00	0	0
666 for an EU Superstate	11	0.00	0	0
Republican Right	9	0.00	0	0
Parties not on the ballot	5,618	0.15	0	–
Total	3,716,778	100.00	20	0
Valid votes	3,716,778	98.88		
Invalid/blank votes	42,173	1.12		
Total votes	3,758,951	100.00		
Registered voters/turnout	7,359,962	51.07		
Source: Val

== Results by county ==
The Swedish results are counted by county only, since the seats are shared on a national basis, rendering eight fewer counting areas than in Riksdag elections.

=== Percentage share ===
Location	Land	Turnout	Share	Votes	S	MP	M	FP	SD	C	V	KD	F!	PP	Other
Blekinge	G	46.2	1.5	54,180	30.2	12.3	12.1	7.4	14.0	7.0	5.6	5.4	3.2	2.3	0.6
Dalarna	S	48.2	2.8	103,454	30.1	11.4	10.4	9.9	11.6	8.2	7.4	4.6	3.9	1.8	0.8
Gotland	G	48.9	0.6	22,429	25.4	17.4	11.8	7.5	5.1	13.9	6.9	3.6	6.1	1.7	0.5
Gävleborg	N	43.9	2.5	94,498	31.1	12.5	9.5	7.9	12.4	7.2	7.6	4.6	4.4	1.9	0.8
Halland	G	50.8	3.2	119,531	22.5	14.4	16.4	10.9	10.4	9.2	4.3	5.8	3.6	1.8	0.7
Jämtland	N	47.4	1.3	46,631	35.9	13.9	8.8	5.0	7.9	11.1	7.2	3.9	4.1	1.6	0.6
Jönköping	G	50.7	3.5	131,019	25.4	11.8	11.4	6.6	11.5	8.1	4.4	16.2	2.6	1.5	0.6
Kalmar	G	45.8	2.3	84,024	28.5	11.9	11.5	6.9	11.7	10.5	5.9	7.4	3.5	1.6	0.6
Kronoberg	G	49.2	1.9	68,813	26.2	12.6	13.1	6.6	12.6	9.7	5.7	7.6	3.6	1.8	0.5
Norrbotten	N	47.3	2.5	92,313	40.7	12.7	7.1	4.7	8.1	4.6	10.3	4.4	4.6	2.1	0.7
Skåne	G	48.7	12.5	463,379	21.0	15.2	16.4	10.2	13.4	5.6	5.1	4.6	5.4	2.3	0.8
Stockholm	S	56.7	24.0	891,125	17.1	19.4	17.6	12.9	6.6	4.6	6.0	4.9	7.4	2.5	0.9
Södermanland	S	47.3	2.6	98,213	28.5	14.3	13.0	9.3	11.0	6.3	6.1	5.3	3.7	1.9	0.6
Uppsala	S	54.0	3.8	141,758	20.9	18.4	11.8	11.8	7.5	7.2	6.2	5.8	6.7	2.9	0.7
Värmland	S	48.0	2.7	101,834	31.8	12.4	11.2	8.6	9.4	8.1	6.6	5.9	3.8	1.7	0.6
Västerbotten	N	53.7	2.9	107,825	32.8	14.0	6.6	6.2	5.9	6.5	11.9	6.5	6.5	2.6	0.5
Västernorrland	N	46.7	2.4	87,908	39.8	10.9	8.3	6.3	8.5	7.5	6.9	5.3	4.0	1.9	0.5
Västmanland	S	46.6	2.5	91,563	30.5	12.2	12.2	9.5	10.8	6.3	6.3	5.6	3.6	2.2	0.8
Västra Götaland	G	52.2	17.3	641,163	22.8	15.2	12.9	10.0	10.1	6.7	6.7	6.5	6.2	2.3	0.6
Örebro	S	49.9	2.9	108,754	30.4	14.5	10.5	7.9	10.3	6.1	6.3	7.1	4.3	1.9	0.8
Östergötland	G	49.5	4.5	166,364	25.8	14.8	12.7	9.3	10.4	6.9	5.1	7.1	4.3	2.8	0.8
Total		51.1	100.0	3,716,778	24.2	15.4	13.7	9.9	9.7	6.5	6.3	5.9	5.5	2.2	0.7
Source: val.se

=== By votes ===
Location	Land	Turnout	Share	Votes	S	MP	M	FP	SD	C	V	KD	F!	PP	Other
Blekinge	G	46.2	1.5	54,180	16,348	6,667	6,558	3,991	7,560	3,777	3,039	2,922	1,756	1,244	318
Dalarna	S	48.2	2.8	103,454	31,116	11,806	10,748	10,244	11,970	8,451	7,631	4,736	4,007	1,875	870
Gotland	G	48.9	0.6	22,429	5,694	3,896	2,646	1,688	1,153	3,119	1,552	813	1,357	387	124
Gävleborg	N	43.9	2.5	94,498	29,360	11,832	9,014	7,490	11,724	6,802	7,197	4,387	4,204	1,760	728
Halland	G	50.8	3.2	119,531	26,855	17,204	19,610	13,024	12,422	11,000	5,190	6,937	4,295	2,107	887
Jämtland	N	47.4	1.3	46,631	16,760	6,461	4,096	2,329	3,663	5,180	3,353	1,803	1,923	763	300
Jönköping	G	50.7	3.5	131,019	33,231	15,470	14,930	8,607	15,120	10,631	5,740	21,212	3,435	1,912	731
Kalmar	G	45.8	2.3	84,024	23,906	10,020	9,636	5,809	9,836	8,861	4,965	6,219	2,909	1,370	493
Kronoberg	G	49.2	1.9	68,813	18,014	8,678	9,048	4,545	8,663	6,678	3,932	5,220	2,474	1,214	347
Norrbotten	N	47.3	2.5	92,313	37,546	11,716	6,593	4,309	7,507	4,274	9,495	4,090	4,234	1,937	612
Skåne	G	48.7	12.5	463,379	97,411	70,075	76,034	47,471	62,154	26,140	23,804	21,103	24,859	10,794	3,534
Stockholm	S	56.7	24.0	891,125	152,230	172,559	157,103	115,158	59,210	41,416	53,723	43,604	65,996	21,961	8,165
Södermanland	S	47.3	2.6	98,213	28,004	14,092	12,790	9,094	10,807	6,171	6,016	5,181	3,670	1,818	570
Uppsala	S	54.0	3.8	141,758	29,683	26,118	16,726	16,711	10,635	10,192	8,797	8,207	9,562	4,155	972
Värmland	S	48.0	2.7	101,834	32,347	12,641	11,400	8,736	9,526	8,233	6,721	6,008	3,904	1,710	608
Västerbotten	N	53.7	2.9	107,825	35,388	15,122	7,121	6,705	6,349	7,058	12,800	6,958	6,990	2,821	513
Västernorrland	N	46.7	2.4	87,908	35,006	9,544	7,273	5,565	7,516	6,550	6,044	4,695	3,548	1,690	477
Västmanland	S	46.6	2.5	91,563	27,883	11,182	11,177	8,710	9,907	5,785	5,804	5,143	3,303	1,978	691
Västra Götaland	G	52.2	17.3	641,163	146,311	97,149	82,523	64,196	65,002	42,709	43,145	41,815	39,668	14,535	4,110
Örebro	S	49.9	2.9	108,754	33,048	15,747	11,395	8,597	11,171	6,642	6,835	7,736	4,701	2,060	822
Östergötland	G	49.5	4.5	166,364	42,933	24,612	21,067	15,535	17,353	11,432	8,489	11,785	7,210	4,672	1,276
Total		51.1	100.0	3,716,778	899,074	572,591	507,488	368,514	359,248	241,101	234,272	220,574	204,005	82,763	27,148
Source: val.se

== Municipal results ==
=== Blekinge ===
Location	Turnout	Share	Votes	S	MP	M	FP	SD	C	V	KD	F!	PP	Other
Karlshamn														
Karlskrona														
Olofström														
Ronneby														
Sölvesborg														
Total	46.2	1.5	54,180	30.2	12.3	12.1	7.4	14.0	7.0	5.6	5.4	3.2	2.3	0.6
Source: val.se

=== Dalarna ===
Location	Turnout	Share	Votes	S	MP	M	FP	SD	C	V	KD	F!	PP	Other
Avesta														
Borlänge														
Falun														
Gagnef														
Hedemora														
Leksand														
Ludvika														
Malung-Sälen														
Mora														
Orsa														
Rättvik														
Smedjebacken														
Säter														
Vansbro														
Älvdalen														
Total	48.2	2.8	103,454	30.1	11.4	10.4	9.9	11.6	8.2	7.4	4.6	3.9	1.8	0.8
Source: val.se

=== Gotland ===
Location	Turnout	Share	Votes	S	MP	M	FP	SD	C	V	KD	F!	PP	Other
Gotland														
Total	48.9	0.6	22,429	25.4	17.4	11.8	7.5	5.1	13.9	6.9	3.6	6.1	1.7	0.5
Source: val.se

=== Gävleborg ===
Location	Turnout	Share	Votes	S	MP	M	FP	SD	C	V	KD	F!	PP	Other
Bollnäs														
Gävle														
Hofors														
Hudiksvall														
Ljusdal														
Nordanstig														
Ockelbo														
Ovanåker														
Sandviken														
Söderhamn														
Total	43.9	2.5	94,498	31.1	12.5	9.5	7.9	12.4	7.2	7.6	4.6	4.4	1.9	0.8
Source: val.se

=== Halland ===
Location	Turnout	Share	Votes	S	MP	M	FP	SD	C	V	KD	F!	PP	Other
Falkenberg														
Halmstad														
Hylte														
Kungsbacka														
Laholm														
Varberg														
Total	50.8	3.2	119,531	22.5	14.4	16.4	10.9	10.4	9.2	4.3	5.8	3.6	1.8	0.7
Source: val.se

=== Jämtland ===
Location	Turnout	Share	Votes	S	MP	M	FP	SD	C	V	KD	F!	PP	Other
Berg														
Bräcke														
Härjedalen														
Krokom														
Ragunda														
Strömsund														
Åre														
Östersund														
Total	47.4	1.3	46,631	35.9	13.9	8.8	5.0	7.9	11.1	7.2	3.9	4.1	1.6	0.6
Source: val.se

=== Jönköping ===
Location	Turnout	Share	Votes	S	MP	M	FP	SD	C	V	KD	F!	PP	Other
Aneby														
Eksjö														
Gislaved														
Gnosjö														
Habo														
Jönköping														
Mullsjö														
Nässjö														
Sävsjö														
Tranås														
Vaggeryd														
Vetlanda														
Värnamo														
Total	50.7	3.5	131,019	25.4	11.8	11.4	6.6	11.5	8.1	4.4	16.2	2.6	1.5	0.6
Source: val.se

=== Kalmar ===
Location	Turnout	Share	Votes	S	MP	M	FP	SD	C	V	KD	F!	PP	Other
Borgholm														
Emmaboda														
Hultsfred														
Högsby														
Kalmar														
Mönsterås														
Mörbylånga														
Nybro														
Oskarshamn														
Torsås														
Vimmerby														
Västervik														
Total	45.8	2.3	84,024	28.5	11.9	11.5	6.9	11.7	10.5	5.9	7.4	3.5	1.6	0.6
Source: val.se

=== Kronoberg ===
Location	Turnout	Share	Votes	S	MP	M	FP	SD	C	V	KD	F!	PP	Other
Alvesta														
Lessebo														
Ljungby														
Markaryd														
Tingsryd														
Uppvidinge														
Växjö														
Älmhult														
Total	49.2	1.9	68,813	26.2	12.6	13.1	6.6	12.6	9.7	5.7	7.6	3.6	1.8	0.5
Source: val.se

=== Norrbotten ===
Location	Turnout	Share	Votes	S	MP	M	FP	SD	C	V	KD	F!	PP	Other
Arjeplog														
Arvidsjaur														
Boden														
Gällivare														
Haparanda														
Jokkmokk														
Kalix														
Kiruna														
Luleå														
Pajala														
Piteå														
Älvsbyn														
Överkalix														
Övertorneå														
Total	47.3	2.5	92,313	40.7	12.7	7.1	4.7	8.1	4.6	10.3	4.4	4.6	2.1	0.7
Source: val.se

=== Skåne ===
Location	Turnout	Share	Votes	S	MP	M	FP	SD	C	V	KD	F!	PP	Other
Bjuv														
Bromölla														
Burlöv														
Båstad														
Eslöv														
Helsingborg														
Hässleholm														
Höganäs														
Hörby														
Höör														
Klippan														
Kristianstad														
Kävlinge														
Landskrona														
Lomma														
Lund														
Malmö														
Osby														
Perstorp														
Simrishamn														
Sjöbo														
Skurup														
Staffanstorp														
Svalöv														
Svedala														
Tomelilla														
Trelleborg														
Vellinge														
Ystad														
Åstorp														
Ängelholm														
Örkelljunga														
Östra Göinge														
Total	48.7	12.5	463,379	21.0	15.2	16.4	10.2	13.4	5.6	5.1	4.6	5.4	2.3	0.8
Source: val.se

=== Stockholm ===
Location	Turnout	Share	Votes	S	MP	M	FP	SD	C	V	KD	F!	PP	Other
Botkyrka														
Danderyd														
Ekerö														
Haninge														
Huddinge														
Järfälla														
Lidingö														
Nacka														
Norrtälje														
Nykvarn														
Nynäshamn														
Salem														
Sigtuna														
Sollentuna														
Solna														
Stockholm														
Sundbyberg														
Södertälje														
Tyresö														
Täby														
Upplands-Bro														
Upplands Väsby														
Vallentuna														
Vaxholm														
Värmdö														
Österåker														
Total	56.4	24.0	891,125	17.1	19.4	17.6	12.9	6.6	4.6	6.0	4.9	7.4	2.5	0.9
Source: val.se

=== Södermanland ===
Location	Turnout	Share	Votes	S	MP	M	FP	SD	C	V	KD	F!	PP	Other
Eskilstuna														
Flen														
Gnesta														
Katrineholm														
Nyköping														
Oxelösund														
Strängnäs														
Trosa														
Vingåker														
Total	47.3	2.6	98,213	28.5	14.3	13.0	9.3	11.0	6.3	6.1	5.3	3.7	1.9	0.6
Source: val.se

=== Uppsala ===
Location	Turnout	Share	Votes	S	MP	M	FP	SD	C	V	KD	F!	PP	Other
Enköping														
Heby														
Håbo														
Knivsta														
Tierp														
Uppsala														
Älvkarleby														
Östhammar														
Total	54.0	3.8	141,758	20.9	18.4	11.8	11.8	7.5	7.2	6.2	5.8	6.7	2.9	0.7
Source: val.se

=== Värmland ===
Location	Turnout	Share	Votes	S	MP	M	FP	SD	C	V	KD	F!	PP	Other
Arvika														
Eda														
Filipstad														
Forshaga														
Grums														
Hagfors														
Hammarö														
Karlstad														
Kil														
Kristinehamn														
Munkfors														
Storfors														
Sunne														
Säffle														
Torsby														
Årjäng														
Total	48.0	2.7	101,834	31.8	12.4	11.2	8.6	9.4	8.1	6.6	5.9	3.8	1.7	0.6
Source: val.se

=== Västerbotten ===
Location	Turnout	Share	Votes	S	MP	M	FP	SD	C	V	KD	F!	PP	Other
Bjurholm														
Dorotea														
Lycksele														
Malå														
Nordmaling														
Norsjö														
Robertsfors														
Skellefteå														
Sorsele														
Storuman														
Umeå														
Vilhelmina														
Vindeln														
Vännäs														
Åsele														
Total	53.7	2.9	107,825	32.8	14.0	6.6	6.2	5.9	6.5	11.9	6.5	6.5	2.5	0.5
Source: val.se

=== Västernorrland ===
Location	Turnout	Share	Votes	S	MP	M	FP	SD	C	V	KD	F!	PP	Other
Härnösand														
Kramfors														
Sollefteå														
Sundsvall														
Timrå														
Ånge														
Örnsköldsvik														
Total	46.7	2.4	87,908	39.8	10.9	8.3	6.3	8.5	7.5	6.9	5.3	4.0	1.9	0.5
Source: val.se

=== Västmanland ===
Location	Turnout	Share	Votes	S	MP	M	FP	SD	C	V	KD	F!	PP	Other
Arboga														
Fagersta														
Hallstahammar														
Kungsör														
Köping														
Norberg														
Sala														
Skinnskatteberg														
Surahammar														
Västerås														
Total	50.3	2.4	101,280	26.7	17.7	17.7	8.7	10.3	7.8	5.7	3.4	0.5	1.5	0.8
Source: val.se

=== Västra Götaland ===
Location	Turnout	Share	Votes	S	MP	M	FP	SD	C	V	KD	F!	PP	Other
Ale														
Alingsås														
Bengtsfors														
Bollebygd														
Borås														
Dals-Ed														
Essunga														
Falköping														
Färgelanda														
Grästorp														
Gothenburg														
Gullspång														
Götene														
Herrljunga														
Hjo														
Härryda														
Karlsborg														
Kungälv														
Lerum														
Lidköping														
Lilla Edet														
Lysekil														
Mariestad														
Mark														
Mellerud														
Munkedal														
Mölndal														
Orust														
Partille														
Skara														
Skövde														
Sotenäs														
Stenungsund														
Strömstad														
Svenljunga														
Tanum														
Tibro														
Tidaholm														
Tjörn														
Tranemo														
Trollhättan														
Töreboda														
Uddevalla														
Ulricehamn														
Vara														
Vårgårda														
Vänersborg														
Åmål														
Öckerö														
Total	52.2	17.3	641,163	22.8	15.2	12.9	10.0	10.1	6.7	6.7	6.5	6.2	2.3	0.6
Source: val.se

=== Örebro ===
Location	Turnout	Share	Votes	S	MP	M	FP	SD	C	V	KD	F!	PP	Other
Askersund														
Degerfors														
Hallsberg														
Hällefors														
Karlskoga														
Kumla														
Laxå														
Lekeberg														
Lindesberg														
Ljusnarsberg														
Nora														
Örebro														
Total	49.9	2.9	108,754	30.4	14.5	10.5	7.9	10.3	6.1	6.3	7.1	4.3	1.9	0.8
Source: val.se

=== Östergötland ===
Location	Turnout	Share	Votes	S	MP	M	FP	SD	C	V	KD	F!	PP	Other
Boxholm														
Finspång														
Kinda														
Linköping														
Mjölby														
Motala														
Norrköping														
Söderköping														
Vadstena														
Valdemarsvik														
Ydre														
Åtvidaberg														
Ödeshög														
Total	49.5	4.5	166,364	25.8	14.8	12.7	9.3	10.4	6.9	5.1	7.1	4.3	2.8	0.8
Source: val.se
