= Schyman =

Schyman is a surname. Notable people with the surname include:

- Garry Schyman, American composer
- Gudrun Schyman (born 1948), Swedish politician
