= Gita Nabavi =

Swedish politician (born 1982)

Gita Nabavi (Persian: گیتا نبوی; born 14 February 1982 in Tehran, Iran) is a Swedish politician. On 24 February 2018 she was elected leader of the Feminist Initiative, along with its founder Gudrun Schyman. In February 2020, Nabavi resigned from her post, stating that she wanted to spend more time with her children.
