= Damian Drăghici =

Romanian musician and politician (born 1970)

- Born: March 31, 1970 (age 56); Bucharest, Romania
- Genres: Lăutari, Balkan music, Jazz, World music
- Occupations: Musician, composer, panflute player
- Instruments: Pan flute; Drums; Cymbal; Piano; Accordion; Double bass
- Years active: 1980–present
- Member of: Damian & Brothers
- Website: damiandraghici.ro

Damian Drăghici (born 31 March 1970) is a Romanian musician, pan flute player, multi-instrumentalist, and composer. He is best known as the leader and founder of the Balkan Lăutari fusion band Damian & Brothers.

== Early life ==
Drăghici was born in Bucharest to a family of lăutari whose distinguished musical heritage dates back at least seven generations. He started to play lăutărească music in the family and tried an array of instruments before settling on the nai at the age of eleven. He is Romani.

Drăghici was already playing panpipes in nightclubs when he was 15. Some fellow musicians gave him a copy of The Real Book, which led to him learning jazz standards and becoming obsessed with jazz.

== Musical career ==
=== USA Berklee College of Music ===
In 1996, Drăghici auditioned for faculty members visiting Athens from the Berklee College of Music in Boston. The school offered him a full scholarship, which Drăghici accepted. While there, he studied with George Garzone, Jerry Bergonzi and Hal Crook.

=== Los Angeles ===
After spending 3 years at Berklee and graduating summa cum laude he relocated to Los Angeles. While there, he became friends with many of the top session musicians in the area. He was eventually introduced to a producer for PBS, which would lead to Drăghici being featured in a large concert backed by a 150-piece orchestra. The concert and its DVD were successful enough for PBS to arrange a tour of the United States, after which Drăghici was offered a recording contract with EMI.

=== Tours ===
In 2004, Drăghici joined James Brown, Joe Cocker, reggae star Shaggy, Cyndi Lauper, Zucchero, Gipsy Kings, Roger Hodgson (Supertramp) and The Pointer Sisters for one of Europe's most esteemed musical events, the Night of the Proms tour.

On 12 November 2010, he showcased his ability to perform some of the most challenging jazz tunes on pan-flute live on stage in a Bucharest concert together with clarinet player Eddie Daniels and vocalist Diane Schuur. At the 8 May 2011 Classical Meets Jazz event Drăghici and violinist Nigel Kennedy performed together in the Palace Square. The repertoire included classical, jazz and Romanian folk music. This was his last public performance as he announced his withdrawal from the music scene.

== Damian & Brothers ==
In 2006 Drăghici decided to come back to his roots with a new concept and a new group, “his gypsy brothers” as he called them. One of the purposes of “Damian & Brothers, was to change the negative perception and stereotypes of the Romani minority through their music. The impact and the huge popularity achieved during the three-year period of the project are a legacy of their common effort.

As the founder and musical director, Drăghici has continued to lead the ensemble through a fusion of traditional lăutari music with rock, jazz, and pop influences.

=== Discography ===
Over its activity, the group has released several studio albums:

- Magdalena – Keeping the Fire Alive (2007)
- Romaniac (2009)
- Gypsy Cuban (2016)
- Gypsy Rock – Change or Die (2016)

=== Collaborations and Receptive Impact ===
With the release of Gypsy Rock – Change or Die in 2016, the project introduced collaborations between traditional lăutari musicians and prominent Romanian pop artists, including Smiley, Delia, Connect-R, Loredana, and Andra. The album's leading single, "În stație la Lizeanu" (featuring Smiley), received extensive radio airplay in Romania and spent multiple weeks on national charts.

=== Member of the European Parliament ===
In the 2014 European Parliament election, he was one of two Roma candidates elected, along with Soraya Post. Drăghici was an MEP for the Romanian Social Democrats during his tenure as an MEP.

== See also ==
- List of Berklee College of Music alumni
