= Climate Alliance (Sweden) =

Climate Alliance Klimatalliansen
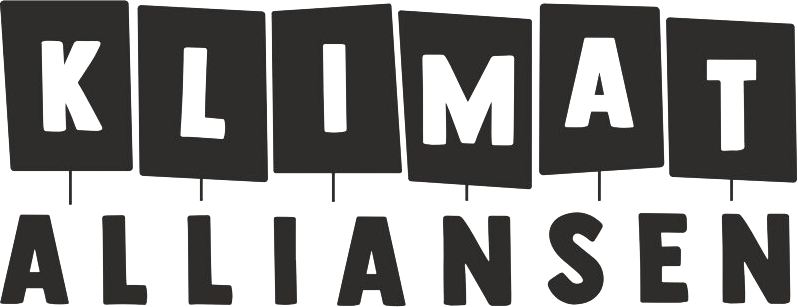
- Leader: Gudrun Schyman; K. G. Hammar
- Founders: Gudrun Schyman; K. G. Hammar; Pontus Bergendahl; William Grönlund; Mariam Jallow Tholozan
- Founded: Autumn 2021
- Registered: 17 March 2022
- Ideology: Environmentalism
- Colours: Black; Yellow

Website
- klimatalliansen.nu

The Climate Alliance (Swedish: Klimatalliansen) is a Swedish political party with a focus on climate issues that describes itself as a non-ideological, party- and bloc-crossing influence organization, neither of the right nor left. The party's electoral platform has been described by classical liberal business think tank Timbro and newspaper Norran editorial board as left-wing.

The Climate Alliance was started in autumn 2021 by people who have long been active in the social debate within various parties or outside party politics, such as Gudrun Schyman, Anders Wijkman, Kristina Persson and K. G. Hammar. The party decided in February 2022 to stand in the parliamentary election, further, on 17 March 2022, the Climate Alliance registered as a party with the electoral authority. The party's parliamentary list is topped by Gudrun Schyman and K. G. Hammar.

In connection with the party announcing that they are standing in the parliamentary elections, Wijkman announced that he will not participate in party work. The party received 0.03% of the vote in the 2022 parliamentary elections.

In June 2022, the party announced that they would also stand in the municipal elections in 2022, including in the city of Stockholm. The list was topped there by former Green Party regional politician Petra Schagerholm. Party leader Gudrun Schyman was elected as a member of the municipal council of Simrishamn in the 2022 elections, though this was on the list of the formally separate Climate Initiative (Swedish: Klimatinitiativ) Simrishamn.

== Election results ==
=== European Parliament ===
Election	List leader	Votes	%	Seats	+/–	EP Group
2024	Helen Wahlgren	1,200	0.03 (#19)	0 / 21	New	–

== See also ==
- Climate movement
