= Maria Robsahm =

Swedish politician (born 1957)

Maria Robsahm (before June 2008 Maria Carlshamre; born Maria Kelldén on 3 February 1957 in Enköping) is a Swedish politician who was a Member of the European Parliament from 2004 to 2009. She was elected as a member of the Liberal People's Party, part of the Alliance of Liberals and Democrats for Europe. However, she defected to Feminist Initiative on 1 March 2006.

She sat on the European Parliament's Committee on Civil Liberties, Justice and Home Affairs and the Committee on Women's Rights and Gender Equality. She was also a substitute for the Committee on Culture and Education and a member of the Delegation to the EU-Moldova Parliamentary Cooperation Committee.

Robsahm was convicted of accounting irregularities in August 2005, following the bankruptcy of a company owned jointly by herself (then known as Maria Carlshamre) and her former husband. She was given a suspended sentence. As a result of her conviction, the leadership of the Liberal People's Party called on her to resign from her seat in the European Parliament. Instead, she left that party and joined Feminist Initiative. This move received some Swedish media attention for the fact that one of the two co-leaders of Feminist Initiative, Gudrun Schyman, had been convicted on another finance-related crime, tax evasion.

== Education ==
- 1979: Bachelor's degree in philosophy
- 1988–90: University diploma in journalism

== Career ==
- 1979–88: lecturer in philosophy at University of Gothenburg
- 1992–95: Editor at TV4
- 1996: Grand prize for journalism
- 1996–97: Journal Moderna tider
- 1998–2002: Documentary film producer at TV4
- 2002–03: Political editor at Dagens Nyheter

== See also ==
- 2004 European Parliament election in Sweden
