= Young Feminists =

Youth wing of the Swedish Feminist Initiative

Young Feminists Unga Feminister
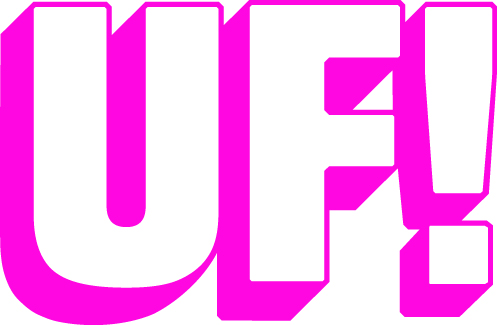
- Chairperson: Nazanin Asaid
- Co-Chairperson: Lisa Palm
- Founded: 2011
- Ideology: Feminism
- Mother party: Feminist Initiative
- Website: www.ungafeminister.se

The Young Feminists (Swedish: Unga Feminister) is the youth wing of the Swedish Feminist Initiative (Swedish: Feministiskt Initiativ). Founded in 2011, it is one of the fastest growing youth organisations in Sweden, having over 2,000 members after three years of operation. The organisation is based upon the same political platform as its parent party, focusing on human rights and gender equality and aligning itself with feminism rather than traditional left–right politics.
