= Sissela Nordling Blanco =

Swedish politician (born 1988)

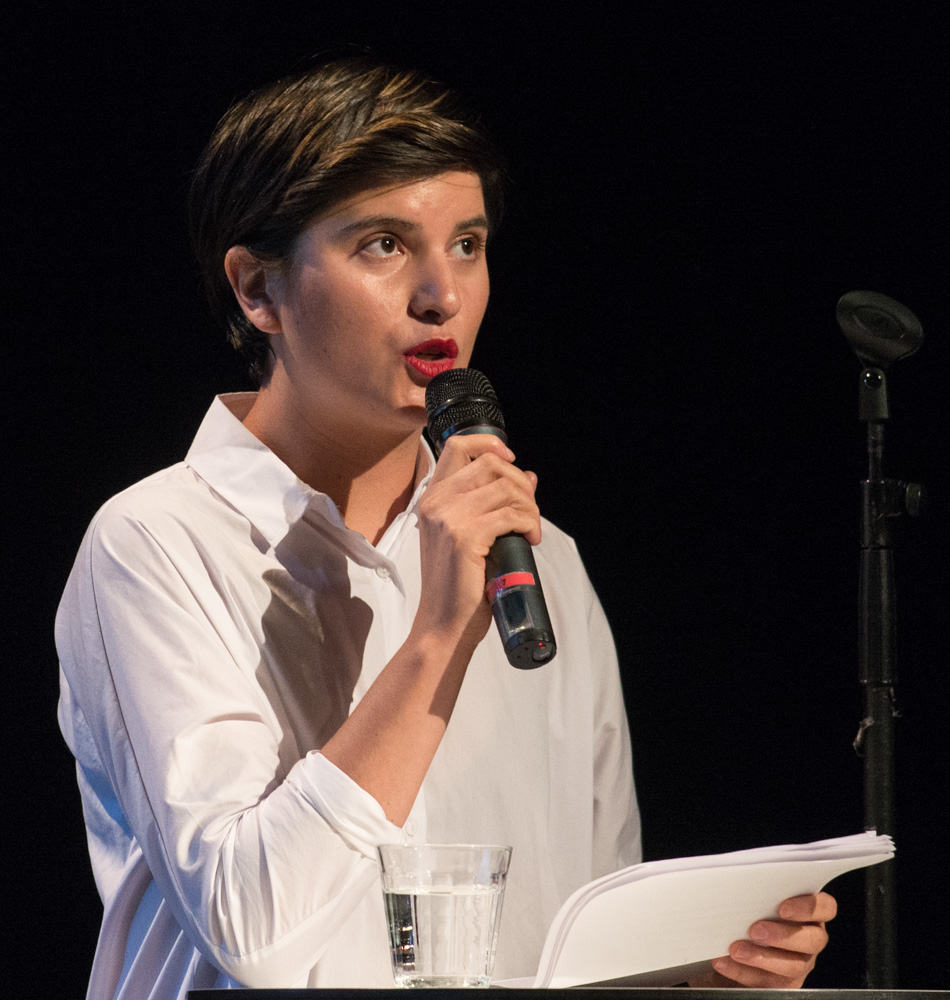
Nordling Blanco in 2016

Sissela Nordling Blanco (born 5 April 1988) is a Swedish politician, who served as spokesperson of the Feminist Initiative party from March 2011 to 2016, serving together with Carl Emanuelsson, Stina Svensson, and Gudrun Schyman.

== Biography ==
Born in 1988 in Uppsala, Nordling Blanco grew up there and in Temuco, Chile. Her maternal grandfather is Hugo Blanco, a Peruvian left-wing peasant leader, former presidential candidate, and socialist member of parliament. Blanco came to Sweden as a political refugee in 1976, where his daughter Carmen Blanco Valer (born 1959) grew up and, among other things, became Chairperson of Solidarity Sweden-Latin America.

Chosen as spokesperson of the feminist political party Feminist Initiative in March 2011, Sissela Nordling Blanco is a candidate for the Riksdag in the September 2014 general election. She lives in Stockholm, where she, in addition to her political work, is a project leader for Fanzingo, a media house for youths in Alby, Botkyrka Municipality. Nordling Blanco has previously worked as a graphic designer and lecturer, and with the feminist and anti-racist think tank Interfem. She was an editor for the book Makthandbok för unga feminister som (be)möter rasism och sexism i föreningslivet published in 2009, and again for its second edition in 2011.

She is also one of the founders of the anti-racist and queer feminist festival Uppsala Pride, which she helped organize in 2007-2009.
