= Soraya Post =

Swedish politician

Soraya Post MEP
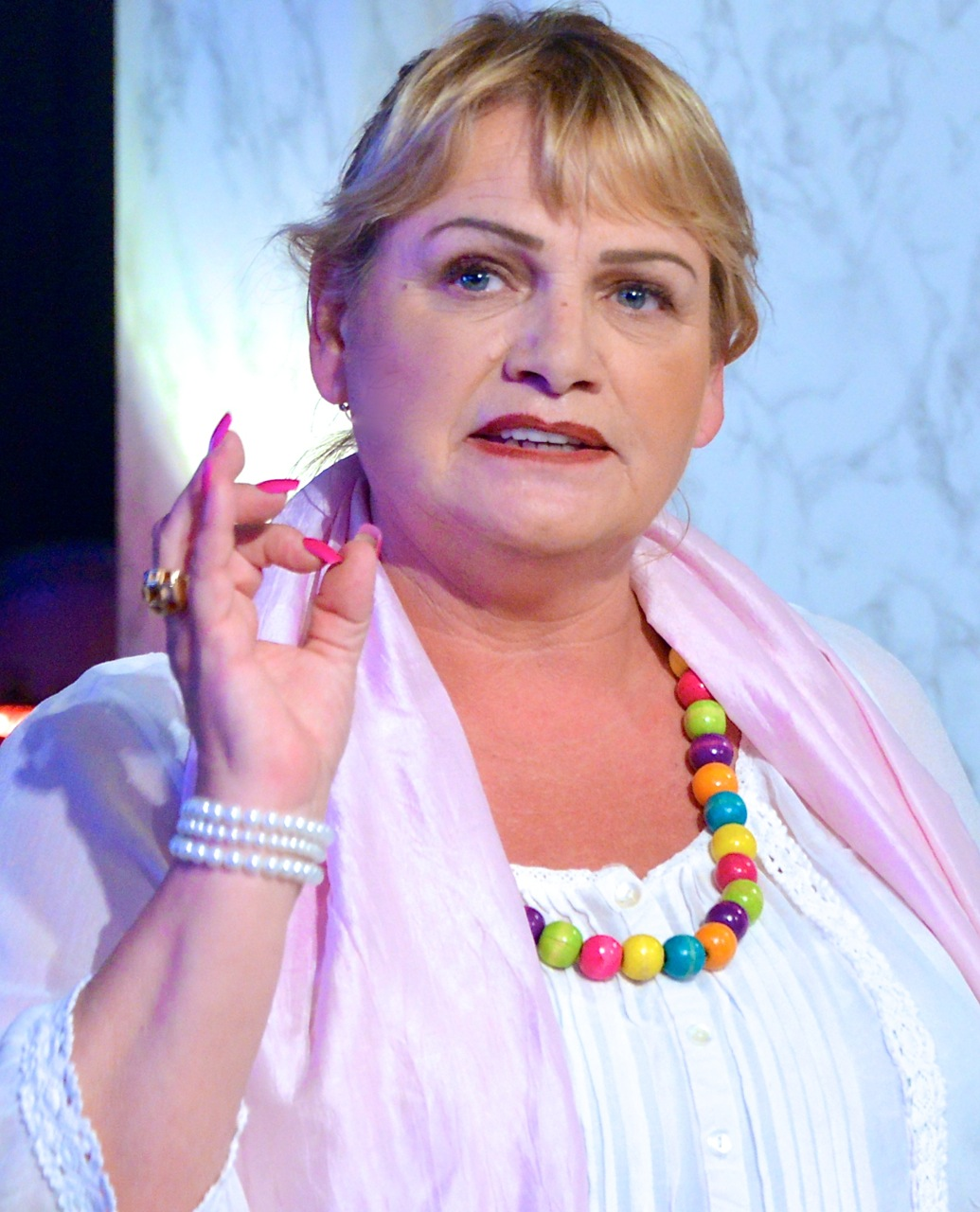

Member of the European Parliament
- In office 1 July 2014 – 2 July 2019
- Constituency: Sweden

Personal details
- Born: Soraya Viola Heléna Post; 15 October 1956 (age 69) Gothenburg, Sweden
- Party: Swedish; Feminist Initiative; EU; Progressive Alliance of Socialists and Democrats
- Education: University of Gothenburg

Soraya Viola Heléna Post (born 15 October 1956) is a Swedish politician who was a member of European Parliament from Sweden. She is a member of the Feminist Initiative, part of the Progressive Alliance of Socialists and Democrats.

== Career ==
Post has worked with questions about national minorities at Västra Götaland County justice and equality committee, and has also worked with question surrounding the Romani people and she also helped starting Agnesbergs folkhögskola in Gothenburg in 2007. She has been a commissioner at Sveriges Television.

In February 2014, Post was chosen as the party's top candidate for the 2014 European Parliament election in Sweden. In the election on 25 May 2014, the Feminist Initiative won one seat in the European Parliament with Post taking the party seat. On 7 June 2014, Post joined the S&D group in the European Parliament.

While Post's election has been widely seen as the party's first European representation, former Liberal People's Party MEP Maria Robsahm had in 2006 defected to the Feminist Initiative, representing the party in the European Parliament until 2009. Post however became the party's first elected MEP and the first Romani in Swedish history to be chosen as a candidate for a political party. Also, Post and Damian Drăghici from Romania were the only MEPs with Romani background at the time.

In addition to her committee assignments, Post served as a member of the European Parliament Intergroup on Western Sahara, and was an outspoken supporter of the Campaign for the Establishment of a United Nations Parliamentary Assembly, an organisation which campaigns for democratic reformation of the United Nations.

Soraya Post is also the initiator of the EU Roma Week, a yearly event that takes place in Brussels in connection to the International Roma Day on 8 April. The week consists of a series of events organized and co-hosted by the European Parliament, the European Commission, the European Economic and Social Committee, the Council of Europe, the City of Brussels, several Members of European Parliament (MEPs) from various political groups, the European Parliament Anti-Racism and Diversity Intergroup (ARDI) and many civil society organisations.

== Personal life ==
Post has Romani ancestry through her mother, and she has been working actively for the rights of Roma people in Sweden and in Europe. Her father was a German-born Jew.

== Debate over child marriages ==
Post's eldest daughter entered into an unofficial marriage/Romani engagement at sixteen years of age which was approved by the Romani community. In 2014, the relationship led to public debate in Sweden where critics accused Post for holding a cultural relativistic position and not opposing child marriages. Post responded by referring to the relationship as an engagement, wrote that the engagement had happened 20 years ago and her position on the issue had evolved and that she clearly was against child marriages.

== See also ==
- Viktória Mohácsi, 2004–2009 MEP of Romani ethnicity
- Damian Drăghici, MEP of Romani ethnicity
- Lívia Járóka, Hungarian politician of part Romani ethnicity elected in 2004
