= Feminist Initiative (Sweden) =

Feminist Initiative Feministiskt initiativ
- Abbreviation: FI
- Spokesperson: Agnes Lundgren and Luis Lineo
- Founder: Gudrun Schyman
- Founded: 4 April 2005
- Headquarters: Stockholm
- Youth wing: Young Feminists
- Membership (2017): ▼5,500
- Ideology: Feminism; Equity feminism
- Political position: Left-wing
- European affiliation: European Feminist Parties Coordination Board
- European Parliament group: Progressive Alliance of Socialists and Democrats (2014–2019)
- Colours: Pink
- Riksdag: 0 / 349
- European Parliament: 0 / 20
- County councils: 0 / 1,696
- Municipal councils: 1 / 12,536

Party flag

Website
- feministisktinitiativ.se

The Feminists (Swedish: Feministerna), Feminist Initiative (2005–2025; Feministiskt initiativ, FI, Fi or F!) is a feminist political party in Sweden. The party was formed in 2005 from a pressure group of the same name, and has since taken part in every election to the Riksdag (Parliament) and the European Parliament. The party won its first elected representative in 2014, with Soraya Post taking one seat in the European Parliament.

Fi received 3.1% of the vote in the 2014 general election, the best result in its history, and won seats in thirteen municipalities in the 2014 municipal elections – including in Sweden's largest cities of Gothenburg and Stockholm, where it became part of governing "red-green-pink" coalitions.

Support for Feminist Initiative dwindled, however, and the party only managed to obtain 0.4% of the vote in the 2018 general election, making it the largest political party without representation in the Riksdag. The party lost four seats in the municipal elections, and did not gain any county council seats.

In October 2018, party co-founder Gudrun Schyman announced that she would step down as leader of the party at the next party congress.

In 2023, Agnes Lundgren and Luis Lineo became co-leaders of the party, succeeding Teysir Subhi.

== History ==
=== Pressure group ===
The original pressure group was presented at a press conference in Stockholm on 4 April 2005. The announcement was preceded by a large number of rumours of a new feminist party; these were concerned, in particular, with the growing feminist movement around Gudrun Schyman, a former leader of the Swedish Left Party and at that time an independent member of the Riksdag.

Schyman is one of Sweden's most prominent political feminists, and had attracted attention when she asked in 2004 how society and men would take responsibility for violence against women. This question came in the form of an investigation, which was dubbed "man tax" by Swedish journalists, for they assumed that was how the problem would be resolved.

At the press conference, the founding members stressed that Fi was not yet a political party. The question of whether or not to stand for elections was postponed until further notice. In 2008, it was stated that the organisation was a political party that would stand in elections. In 2009, Feminist Initiative stood for the European Parliament election and got 2.2 percent. In 2010, it stood in the national, regional and local elections.

=== Political party ===
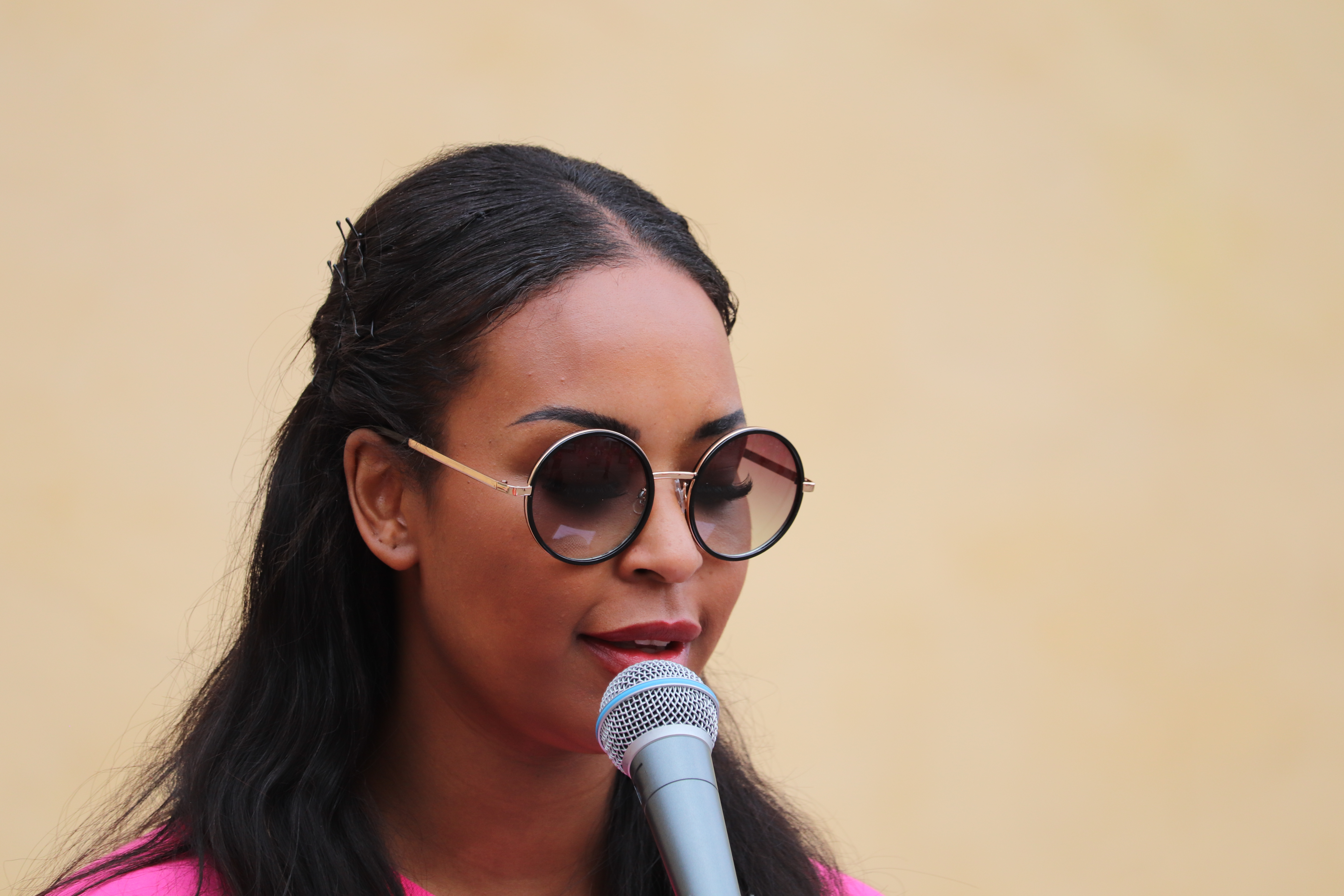
Teysir Subhi, leader of the party from 2022 to 2023

Following the introduction of the pressure group, things happened quickly. Six days later, the Fi website announced that the association now had more than 2,500 members. Regional and local groups of Fi were announced on the website regularly. Fi's first annual national conference was held in Örebro on 9–11 September 2005, and some 200 motions were submitted.

The inaugural assembly gathered some 350 members (still lacking a formal structure, the participants choose to regard themselves as independent members rather than delegates from regions or local groups). The agenda included three major decisions: the establishing of a political party, formulation of a party agenda, and organisational matters (notably a decision on chairperson). On 9 September 2005, the decision was taken to organise as a political party and stand for the parliamentary general election in 2006. The party's first executive committee included Ann-Marie Tung, Anna Jutterdal, Cecilia Chrapkowska, Gudrun Schyman, Helena Brandt, Lotten Sunna, Maria Jansson, Monica Brun, Monica Amante, Sandra Andersson, Sandra Dahlén, Sofia Karlsson, and Tiina Rosenberg.

Media also focused attention on what came to be called "the decision to campaign to abolish marriage" and the current state-recognised cohabiting partnerships, and instead introduce a new Cohabitation Act (Swedish: sammanlevnadsbalk) which would encompass a new legal status for private relationships between more than two people, irrespective of gender, thereby raising the possibility of legally recognising polygamy. In the event the decision was to enlarge the marriage law so as to include any form of voluntary cohabitation.

Regarding organisational matters, the conference decided to appoint three executive committee members as their spokespersons (Swedish: talesperson). So far it has, however, not been made clear to the public what the powers and functions of these spokespersons are. It was also decided that men could hold offices within Fi, whereupon two men were elected to the executive committee.

Professor Tiina Rosenberg was accused of plagiarism by political scientist Johan Tralau, citing a 2000 book review of Rosenberg's Byxbegär ('Wearing the trousers'). After a review of the alleged errors in the book, Rosenberg's faculty at Stockholm University deemed the matter unnecessary to investigate further. Rosenberg left Fi in October 2005, citing media attention and criticism directed toward her research and person as the reason, claiming to be the target of a deliberate antifeminist campaign instigated by right-wing lobbyists.

Some of the statements attributed to Tiina Rosenberg, such as "women who have sex with men are traitors to their sex" were criticized as too radical for the party by some other leading Fi members like Susanne Linde and Ebba Witt-Brattström. This led to worsening personal conflicts within the party, with both Linde and Witt-Brattström distancing themselves from the party.

On 1 March 2006, Liberal People's Party's MEP Maria Carlshamre defected to Feminist Initiative, while remaining within the liberal Alliance of Liberals and Democrats for Europe Group group. She explained her defection by citing "a lack of consideration for feminist issues among her former colleagues".

In 2005, Jane Fonda and Eve Ensler supported Fi by joining the election tour in Sweden. Fonda also donated 400,000 Swedish kronor for the campaign. In the days before the Swedish election on 17 September 2006, Fonda came to Sweden again to support the party's election campaign.

Benny Andersson, one of the members of the group ABBA, donated one million kronor to the party in 2009 for its European Parliament campaign.

In July 2010, the party burned 100,000 Swedish kronor ($13,000; £8,500) in a protest against unequal pay. Fi wanted to draw attention to its proposal for a government fund for equal pay. The money that was burned had been donated by the advertising agency Studio Total, and the event got major publicity around the world. In 2010, the Swedish electro group The Knife also donated money to the party.

In July 2016, the party announced that it was officially supporting the Black Lives Matter movement.

In July 2018, Feminist Initiative member Oldoz Javidi was strongly criticized in Swedish media for anti-semitic remarks made during a Ship to Gaza voyage. Javidi stated in an interview that the Jews living in Israel should be moved to the USA, a remark that made journalists draw comparisons to deportations during WWII. Javidi left the party following the criticism.

Gudrun Schyman announced on 28 October 2018 that she would not seek re-election as party leader at the next FI party congress, although she remains on the voting ballots in case of a snap election. She will remain a member of the party.

Gita Nabavi, who was re-elected to lead the party with Farida al-Abani in 2019, said that the party is made up of a diverse range of people. She said this includes: people of immigrant backgrounds, people who are transgender (who are spokespeople within the party on cultural issues), and people who are gay, lesbian, or bisexual. Nabavi also said that the party is anti-racist and that the outlook was a "huge part of our ideology and our way of working".

=== Spokespeople/leaders ===
- Sofia Karlsson, Devrim Mavi, Gudrun Schyman 2005–2006
- Sofia Karlsson, Gudrun Schyman 2006–2007
- Gudrun Schyman, Stina Sundberg 2007–2011
- Sissela Nordling Blanco, Carl Emanuelsson, Stina Svensson 2011–2013
- Sissela Nordling Blanco, Gudrun Schyman, Stina Svensson 2013–2015
- Sissela Nordling Blanco, Gudrun Schyman 2015–2016
- Gudrun Schyman 2016–2017
- Victoria Kawesa, Gudrun Schyman 2017
- Gudrun Schyman 2017–2018
- Gita Nabavi, Gudrun Schyman 2018–2019
- Gita Nabavi, Farida al-Abani 2019–2020
- Farida al-Abani 2020–2021
- Farida al-Abani, Teysir Subhi 2021–2022
- Teysir Subhi 2022–2023
- Agnes Lundgren and Luis Lineo 2023–

== Public support and election results ==
According to surveys made in 2005, as many as 10% might vote for the party. In the 2006 general election, the party received 0.68%. A party needs 4% to get into the Riksdag (Swedish parliament). In the 2009 European elections, the party improved its result, getting 2.2% of the national vote. However, this was not enough to get a seat in the European Parliament. In June 2009, it emerged that a one million kronor donation made to the party by former ABBA member Benny Andersson.

In the 2010 election, Fi saw a slump in support, compared to 2006, falling from 0.68% to 0.40% of the vote. Fi became the third-biggest party in the southern municipality of Simrishamn, with 8.9% of the votes, giving them four seats in the city council.

The 2014 European Parliament election proved to be the party's most successful election so far; it attracted 5.3% of the national vote in Sweden, with Soraya Post taking one seat as an MEP. In June 2014, the party announced that its single MEP would join the Socialists and Democrats group in the European parliament.

They appeared in the 2014 Swedish general election on 14 September. In its campaign, the party was supported by American recording artist Pharrell Williams and by Benny Andersson. Despite missing the electoral threshold, the Fi received by far the largest share of votes outside of parliament, with 3.12%. It also greatly increased its share of representation in municipalities, gaining seats in 13 municipalities.

In the 2022 Swedish municipal elections, the party was reduced to just three city council seats across the country.

The party only stood for election locally in the Gullspång Municipality for the 2026 elections, where it retained a single seat.

=== Riksdag ===
Election	Votes	%	Seats	+/–	Notes
2006	37,954	0.7 (#9)	0 / 349	New	No seats
2010	24,139	0.4 (#10)	0 / 349	0	No seats
2014	194,719	3.1 (#9)	0 / 349	0	No seats
2018	27,717	0.4 (#9)	0 / 349	0	No seats
2022	3,157	0.05 (#16)	0 / 349	0	No seats
2026	1,286	0.02 (#17)	0 / 349	0	No seats

=== European Parliament ===
Election	List leader	Votes	%	Seats	+/–	EP Group
2009	Gudrun Schyman	70,434	2.22 (#11)	0 / 18	New	—N/a
2014	Soraya Post	204,005	5.49 (#9)	1 / 20	▲1	S&D
2019	Soraya Post	32,143	0.77 (#9)	0 / 20	▼1	—N/a
2024 (Note: Run in a joint list with Turning Point Party.)	Paula Dahlberg	2,545	0.06 (#15)	0 / 21	0	—N/a

== See also ==
- Feminism in Sweden
- Feminist Party (Finland)
- Feminist Initiative (Norway)
