= Johan Tralau =

Swedish political scientist and writer (born 1972)

Johan Tralau (born 17 October 1972) is a Swedish political scientist and writer. He teaches at Uppsala University where he is Professor of Government since 2015. His 2002 Ph.D. thesis concerns utopian ideas in the philosophy of Georg Wilhelm Friedrich Hegel and their development in the writings of Karl Marx and Ernst Jünger. Tralau's subsequent research has focused on the origin of political philosophy in ancient Greece and on Thomas Hobbes. In 2013 he received the Johan Lundblad Award from the Swedish Academy for his work on ancient Greece. His 2015 book Monstret i mig ("the monster in me") is about mythological monsters and what roles such myths have played in traditional societies.

In 2007 and 2008 he hosted the television program Kanon-TV on Axess TV. In 2023, Tralau published Höken sjunger om död through Bokförlaget Polaris. Höken sjunger om död is his first fictional book, a detective novel set in Uppsala.

== Bibliography ==
- Människoskymning: främlingskap, frihet, och Hegels problem hos Karl Marx och Ernst Jünger (2002), translated into German as Menschendämmerung: Karl Marx, Ernst Jünger und der Untergang des Selbst (2005)
- Thomas Hobbes and Carl Schmitt: Order, Myth, and the Politics of Concealment (editor, 2008)
- Draksådd: den grekiska tragedin som politiskt tänkande (2010)
- Inbjudan till politisk teori (2012)
- Höken sjunger om död (2023)
