= Gudrun Schyman =

Swedish politician (born 1948)

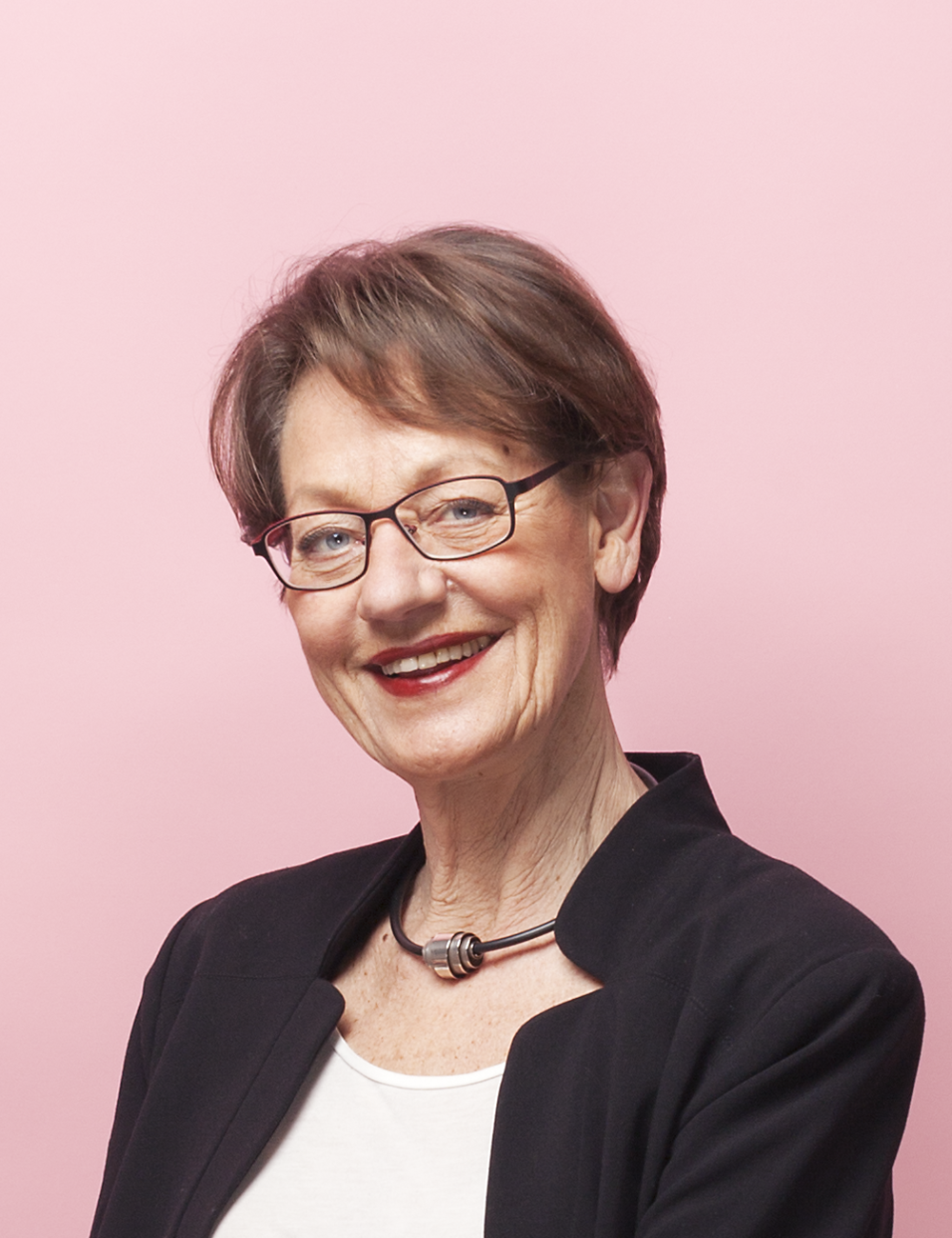
- Gudrun Schyman in August 2014

Leader of Feminist Initiative
- In office 6 March 2013 – 28 October 2018 Serving with Sissela Nordling Blanco (since 2011)

Leader of the Swedish Left Party
- In office 7 January 1993 – 26 January 2003
- Preceded by: Lars Werner
- Succeeded by: Ulla Hoffmann (Interim)

Member of the Riksdag
- In office 3 October 1988 – 5 September 1997
- In office 8 October 1997 – 2 October 2006 (Note: She represented the Left Party until she left it in 2004; she then sat until 2006 as an independent politician.)
- Constituency: Stockholm County

Personal details
- Born: Gerd Gudrun Maria Schyman; 9 June 1948 (age 78) Täby, Sweden
- Party: Climate Alliance
- Other political affiliations: Left Party (until 2004); Feminist Initiative (2005–2022)
- Education: Socialhögskolan i Stockholm
- Profession: Politician
- Website: schyman.se

Gerd Gudrun Maria Schyman (born 9 June 1948) is a Swedish politician. She served as leader of the Swedish Left Party from 1993 until January 2003. She remained a member of the Left Party until 2004, when she left to focus entirely on her feminist political work after a tax evasion scandal. She remained an independent member of the Riksdag until 2006. She co-founded Feminist Initiative in 2005 and was its co-spokesperson from 2005 to 2011 and from 2013 to 2019. She left the party in 2022.

== Leader of the Left Party ==
In 1993, Schyman was elected leader of the Left Party. Schyman's greatest asset was her appeal to the voters, and her party more than doubled its number of MPs during her leadership. She gained popularity for her candor: for example, she was open about her struggle with alcoholism and supported an initiative to make the Riksdag an alcohol-free workplace. During her period as party president, the party adopted feminism as an ideological basis. In 2003, she was charged with and later found guilty of misleading the tax authorities by attempting to take illicit tax deductions. She was temporarily succeeded by Ulla Hoffmann.

In 2002, she made a controversial speech concerning men's oppression of women, in which she said "The discrimination and the violations appears in different shapes depending on where we find ourselves. But it's the same norm, the same structure, the same pattern, that is repeated both in the Taliban's Afghanistan and here in Sweden".

In October 2004, Schyman together with other MEPs of the Left Party proposed before the Riksdag, a national assessment of the cost of men's violence towards women; furthermore they demanded that the state fund women's shelters. The proposal attracted wide attention, with the media calling it a "man tax".

== Founder of the Feminist Initiative ==
Schyman left the Left Party in 2004, and in 2005 co-founded Feminist Initiative (Fi), an organization which at its first congress decided to contest the coming parliamentary elections. Jane Fonda supported her in 2006, during the party's campaign prior to the 2006 Swedish general election. Fi received only approximately 0.7% of the vote, well below the 4% threshold required for parliamentary representation. In the 2009 European Parliament election in Sweden, the party received 2.22% of the vote.

In the summer leading up to the 2010 Swedish general election, Schyman burned 100,000 Swedish krona in a protest against unequal pay in Sweden. The stunt, staged by advertising collective Studio Total, gave Fi widespread attention; however, the party received only 0.4% of the vote in the election.

The 2014 European Parliament election in Sweden proved to be the party's most successful election so far; it attracted 5.3% of the national vote, with Soraya Post taking one seat as an MEP. In the 2014 Swedish general election Fi received 3.1% of the vote; despite still not meeting the 4.0% threshold for getting seats, it became the most popular party outside of the Riksdag.

== Notes ==
Preceded by Lars Werner	Leader of the Swedish Left Party; 1993–2003	Succeeded by Ulla Hoffmann
