= 2024 European Parliament election in Sweden =

- 9 June 2024

21 Swedish seats to the European Parliament
- Turnout: 53.39% (▼1.88pp)
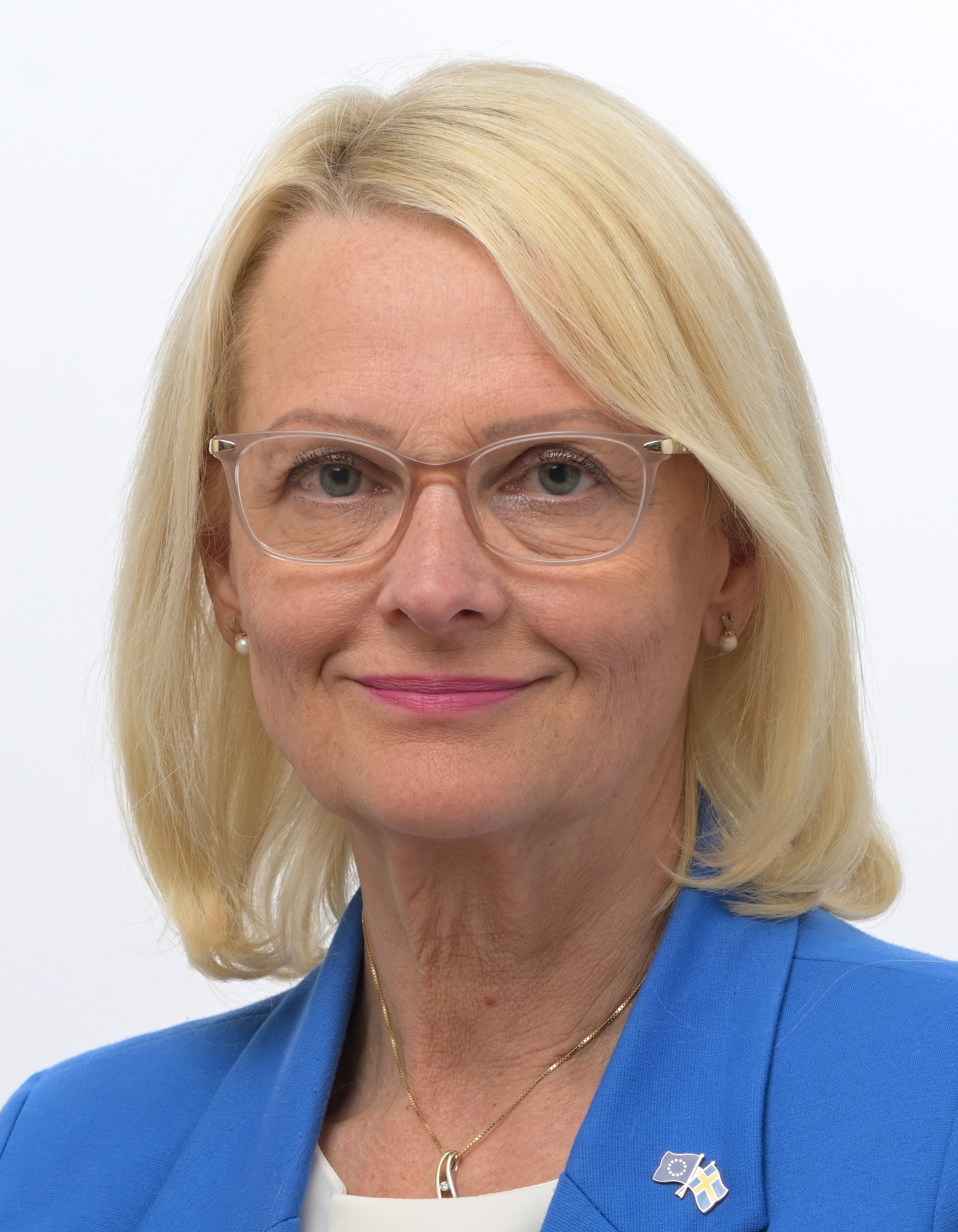

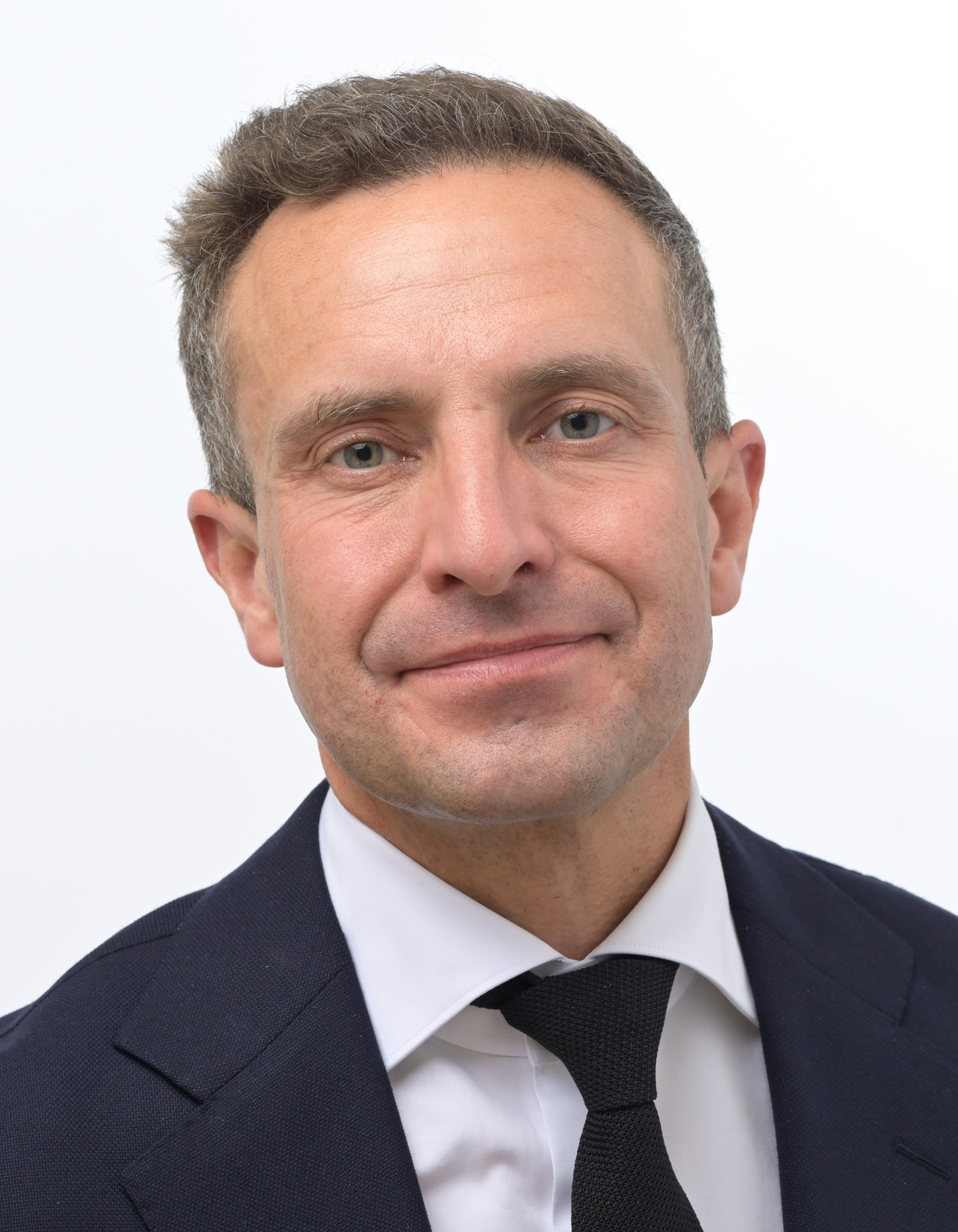

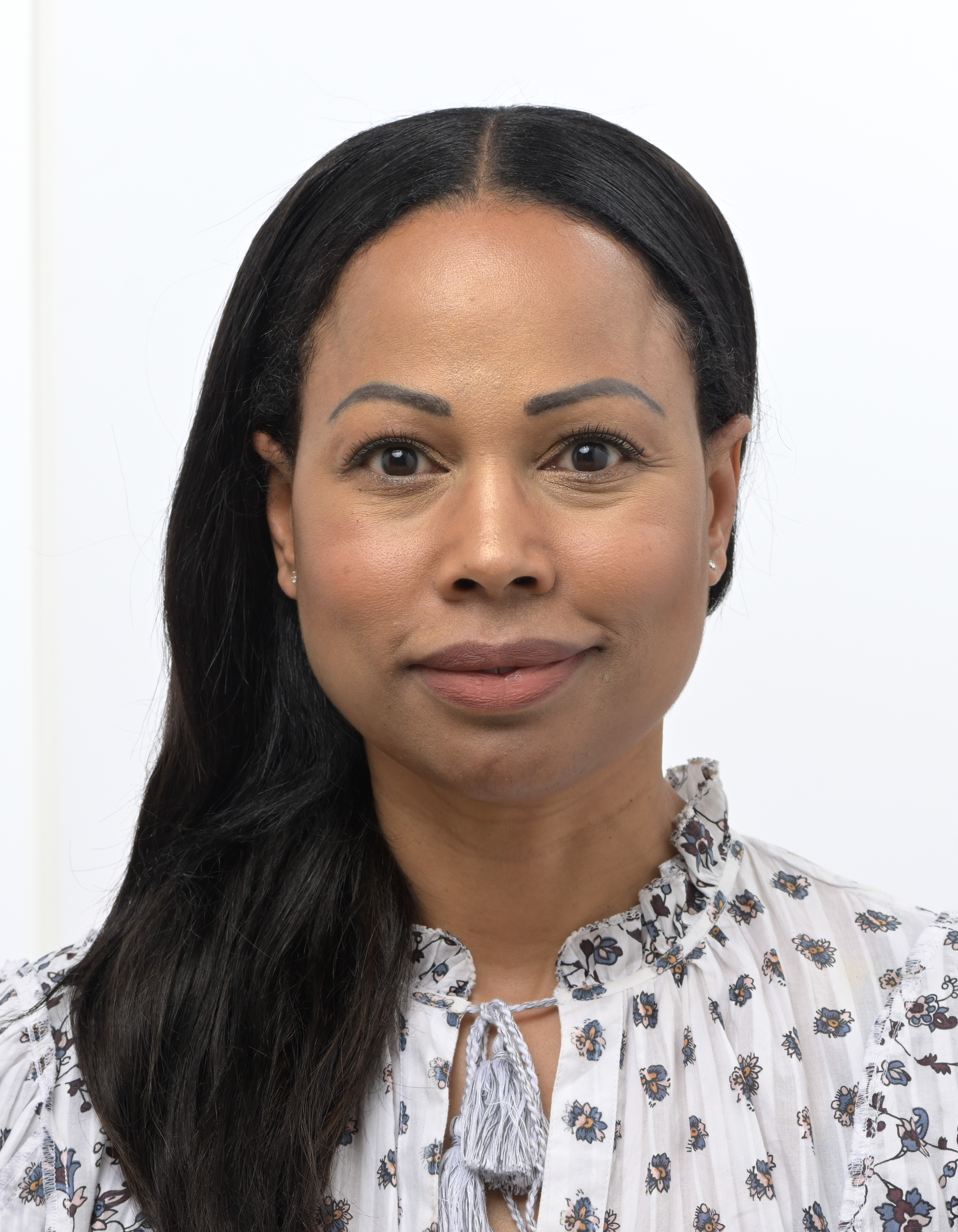

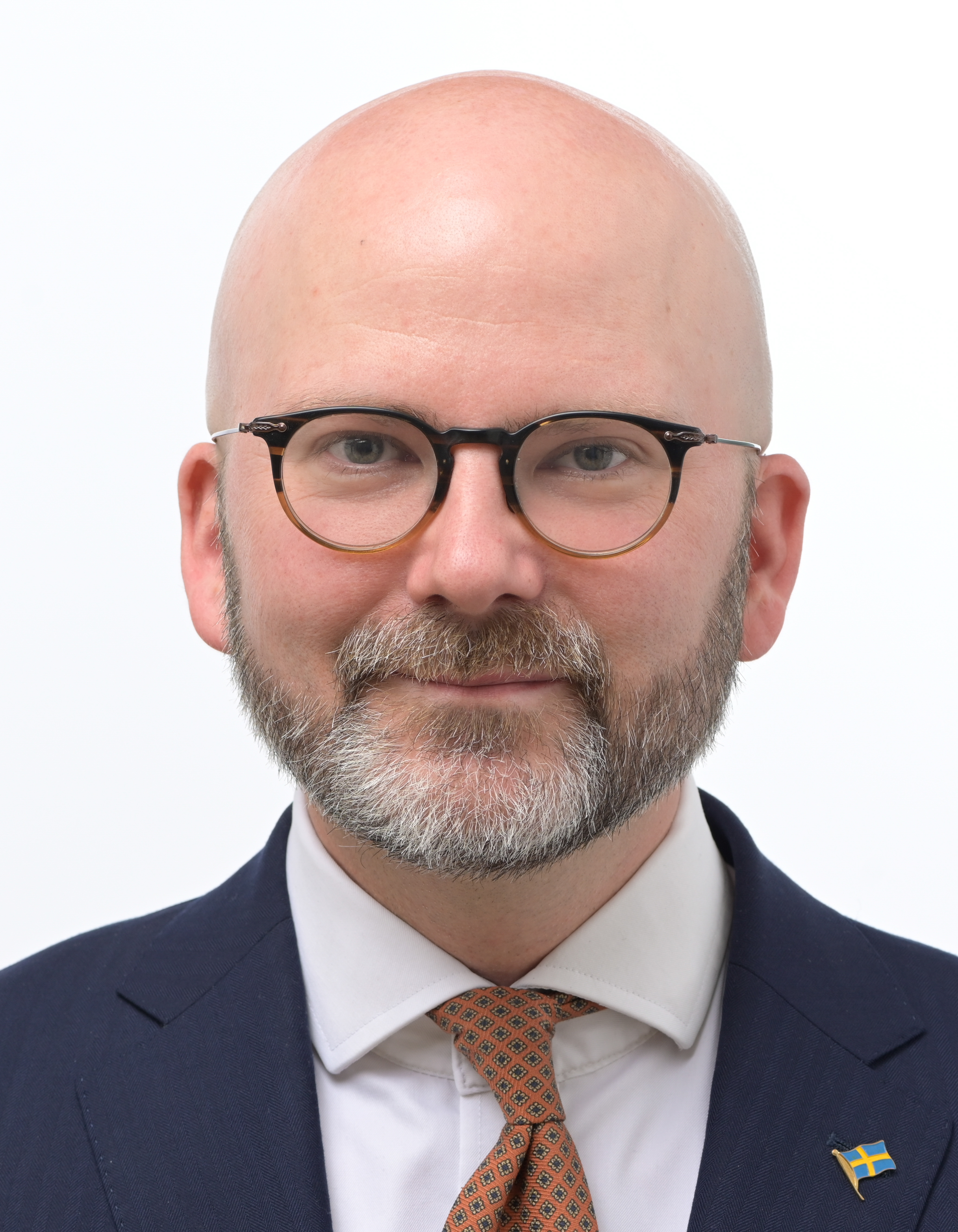

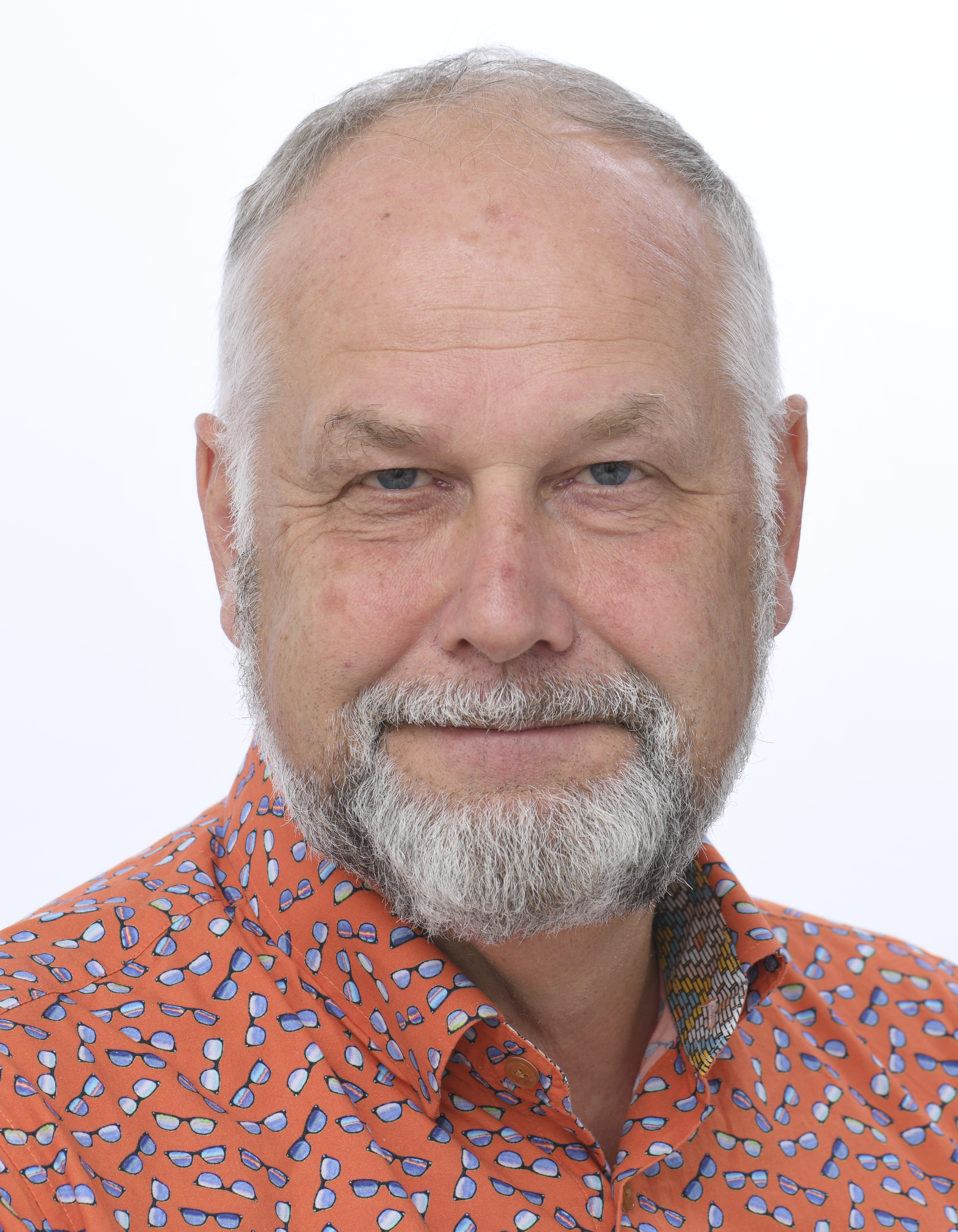

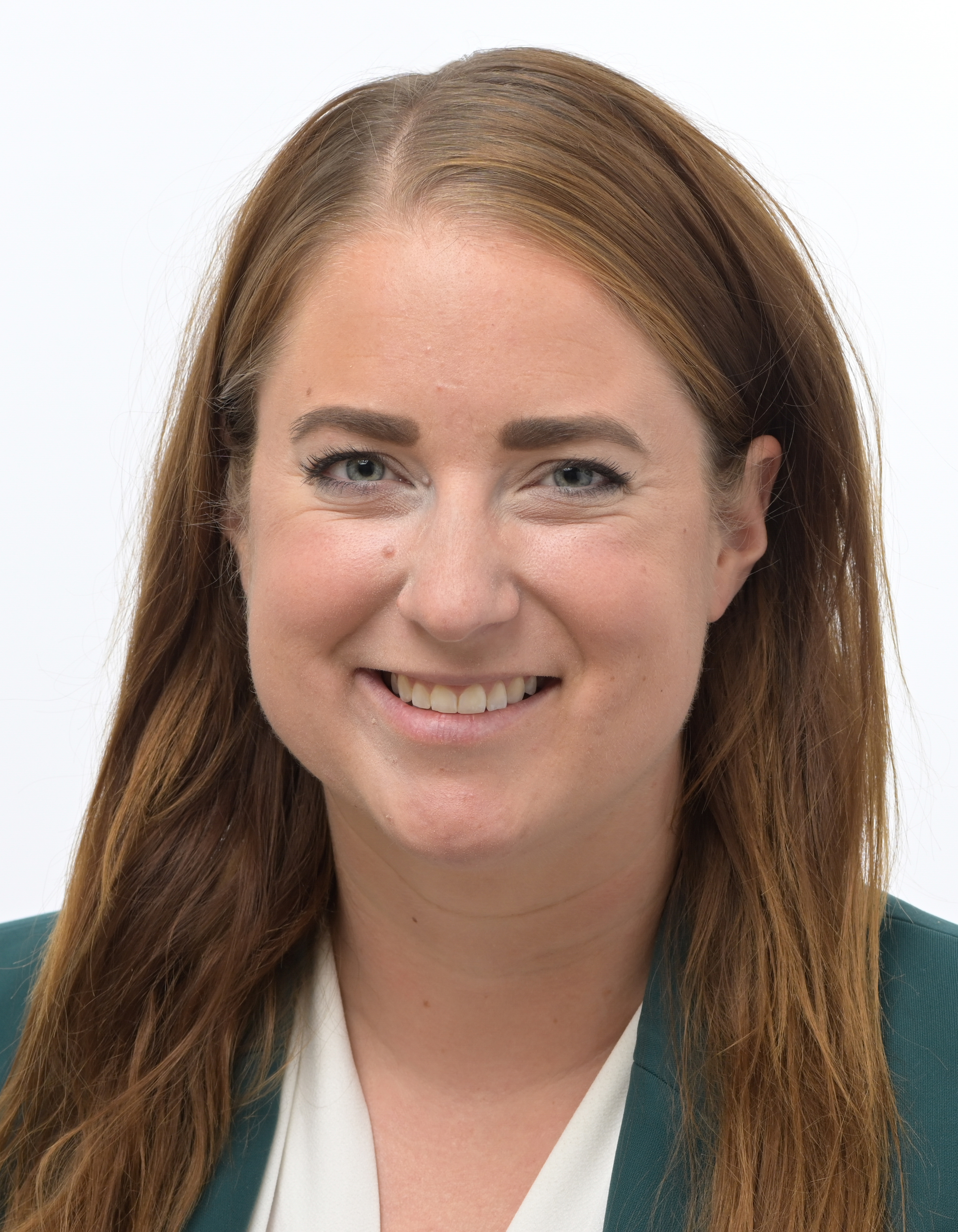

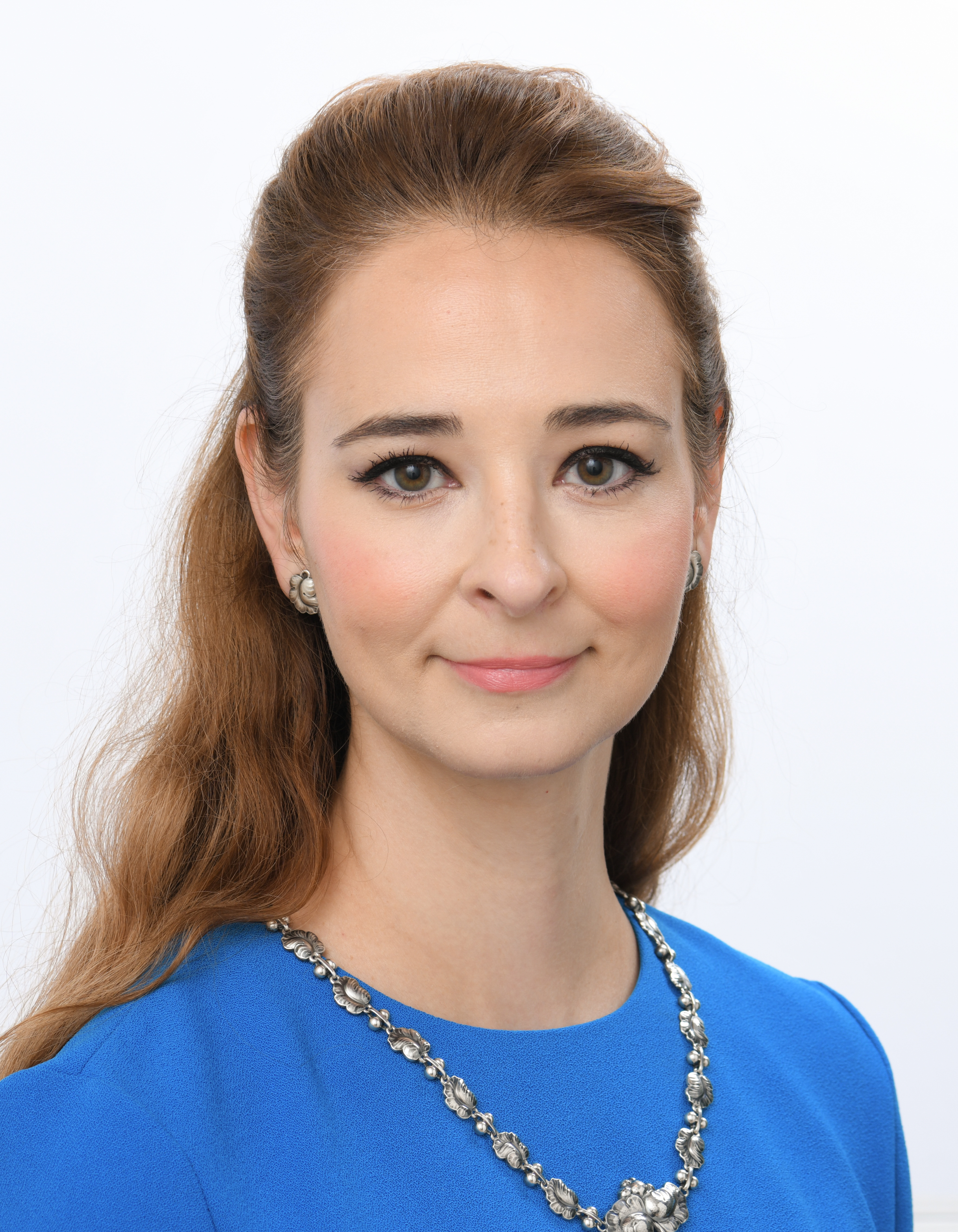

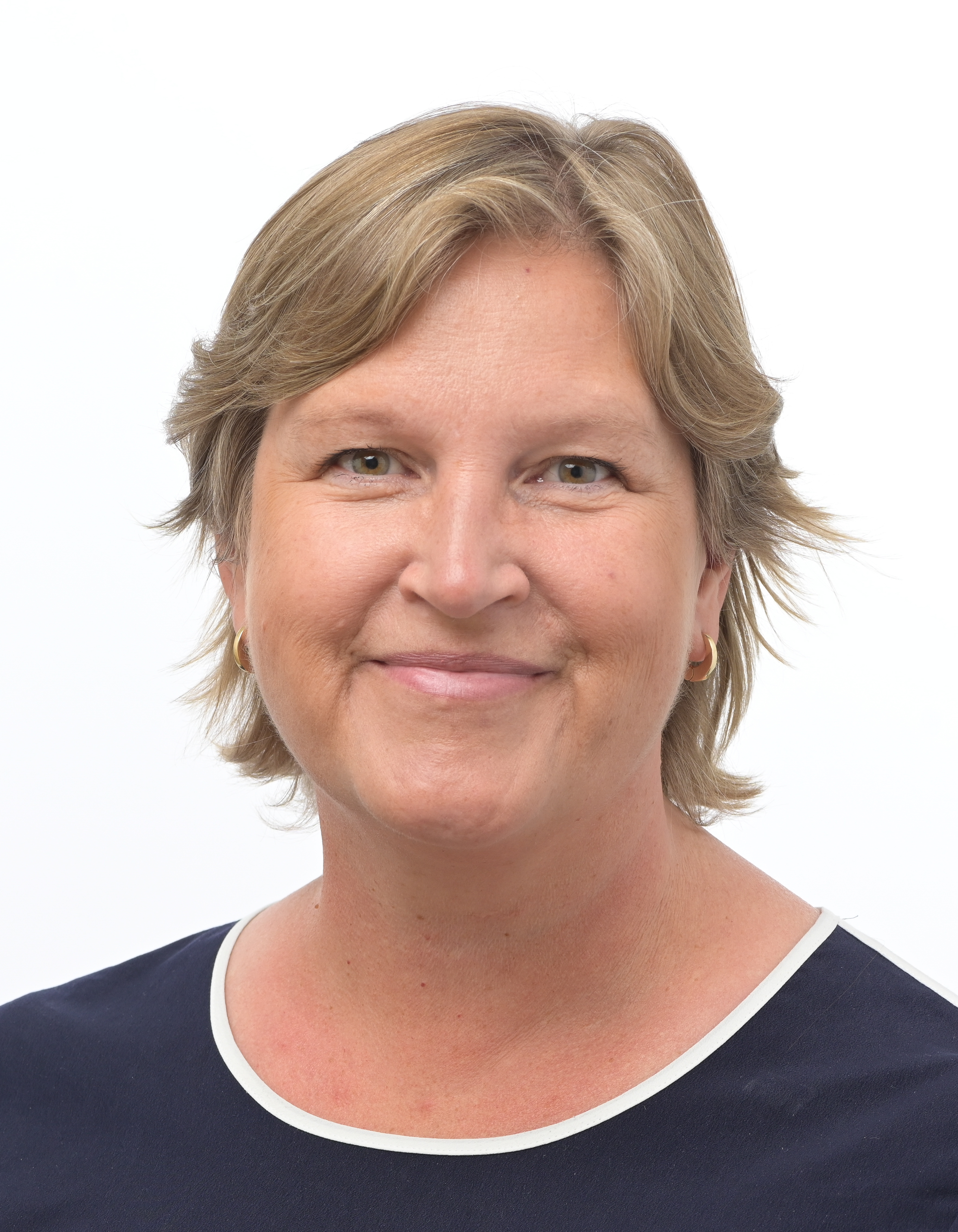
	First party	Second party	Third party
Candidate	Heléne Fritzon	Tomas Tobé	Alice Bah Kuhnke
Party	Social Democrats	Moderate	Green
Alliance	S&D	EPP	Greens–EFA
Last election	23.48%, 5 seats	16.83%, 4 seats	11.52%, 3 seats
Seats won	5	4	3
Seat change	Steady	Steady	Steady
Popular vote	1,039,676	736,079	581,322
Percentage	24.77%	17.53%	13.85%
Swing	▲1.29	▲0.70	▲2.33
	Fourth party	Fifth party	Sixth party
Candidate	Charlie Weimers	Jonas Sjöstedt	Emma Wiesner
Party	Sweden Democrats	Left	Centre
Alliance	ECR	The Left	Renew
Last election	15.34%, 3 seats	6.80%, 1 seat	10.78%, 2 seats
Seats won	3	2	2
Seat change	Steady	▲1	Steady
Popular vote	552,920	464,166	306,227
Percentage	13.17%	11.06%	7.29%
Swing	▼2.17	▲4.26	▼3.49
	Seventh party	Eighth party
Candidate	Alice Teodorescu Måwe	Karin Karlsbro
Party	Christian Democrats	Liberals
Alliance	EPP	Renew
Last election	8.62%, 2 seats	4.13%, 1 seat
Seats won	1	1
Seat change	▼1	Steady
Popular vote	239,530	183,675
Percentage	5.71%	4.38%
Swing	▼2.91	▲0.25
- County results

The 2024 European Parliament election in Sweden were held on 9 June 2024 as part of the 2024 European Parliament election. This was the seventh European Parliament election held in Sweden, and the first to take place after Brexit.

== Electoral system ==
=== Apportionment ===
Compared to last election, Sweden is entitled to one more MEP that has already been assigned in 2020 in the occasion of the redistribution post Brexit.

=== Electoral law ===
The 21 members are elected through semi-open list proportional representation in a single nationwide constituency with seats allocated through modified Sainte-Laguë system and a 4% electoral threshold.

Both Swedish and EU citizens residing in the country are entitled to vote in the European elections in Sweden. No registration is needed for Swedish citizens, while other EU citizens residing in Sweden are required to register in the county of their residence at least 30 days prior to election day. In addition, those eligible to vote must turn 18 years old by election day at the latest.

== Outgoing delegation ==
The table shows the detailed composition of the Swedish seats at the European Parliament as of 4 May 2024.

EP Group	Seats	Party	Seats	MEPs
European People's Party	6 / 21	Moderate Party	4	Arba Kokalari; Jessica Polfjärd; Tomas Tobé; Jörgen Warborn
European People's Party	6 / 21	Christian Democrats	1	David Lega
European People's Party	6 / 21	People’s List	1	Sara Skyttedal
Progressive Alliance of Socialists and Democrats	5 / 21	Swedish Social Democratic Party	5	Ilan de Basso; Heléne Fritzon; Linus Glanzelius; Evin Incir; Carina Ohlsson
Renew Europe	3 / 21	Centre Party	2	Abir Al-Sahlani; Emma Wiesner
Renew Europe	3 / 21	Liberals	1	Karin Karlsbro
Greens–European Free Alliance	3 / 21	Green Party	3	Jakop Dalunde; Pär Holmgren; Alice Bah Kuhnke
European Conservatives and Reformists	3 / 21	Sweden Democrats	1	Charlie Weimers
European Conservatives and Reformists	3 / 21	Independent	1	Peter Lundgren
European Conservatives and Reformists	3 / 21	People’s List	1	Johan Nissinen
The Left in the European Parliament – GUE/NGL	1 / 21	Left Party	1	Malin Björk
Total			21	
Source: European Parliament

=== Retiring incumbents ===
Name	Party	First elected	Terms	Date announced	Source
Peter Lundgren	Independent (Note: Elected from Sweden Democrats, left the party in February 2022)	2014	2	19 March 2022	
Malin Björk	Left Party	2014	2	22 August 2023	
David Lega	Christian Democrats	2019	1	13 October 2023	
Jakop Dalunde	Green Party	2016 (Note: Replaced Peter Eriksson)	2	18 October 2023	
Erik Bergkvist	Swedish Social Democratic Party	2019	1	17 November 2023	
Carina Ohlsson	Swedish Social Democratic Party	2022 (Note: Replaced Jytte Guteland)	1	17 November 2023	
Linus Glanzelius	Swedish Social Democratic Party	2024 (Note: Replaced Erik Bergkvist who had died in office.)	1	17 November 2023	

== Contesting parties ==
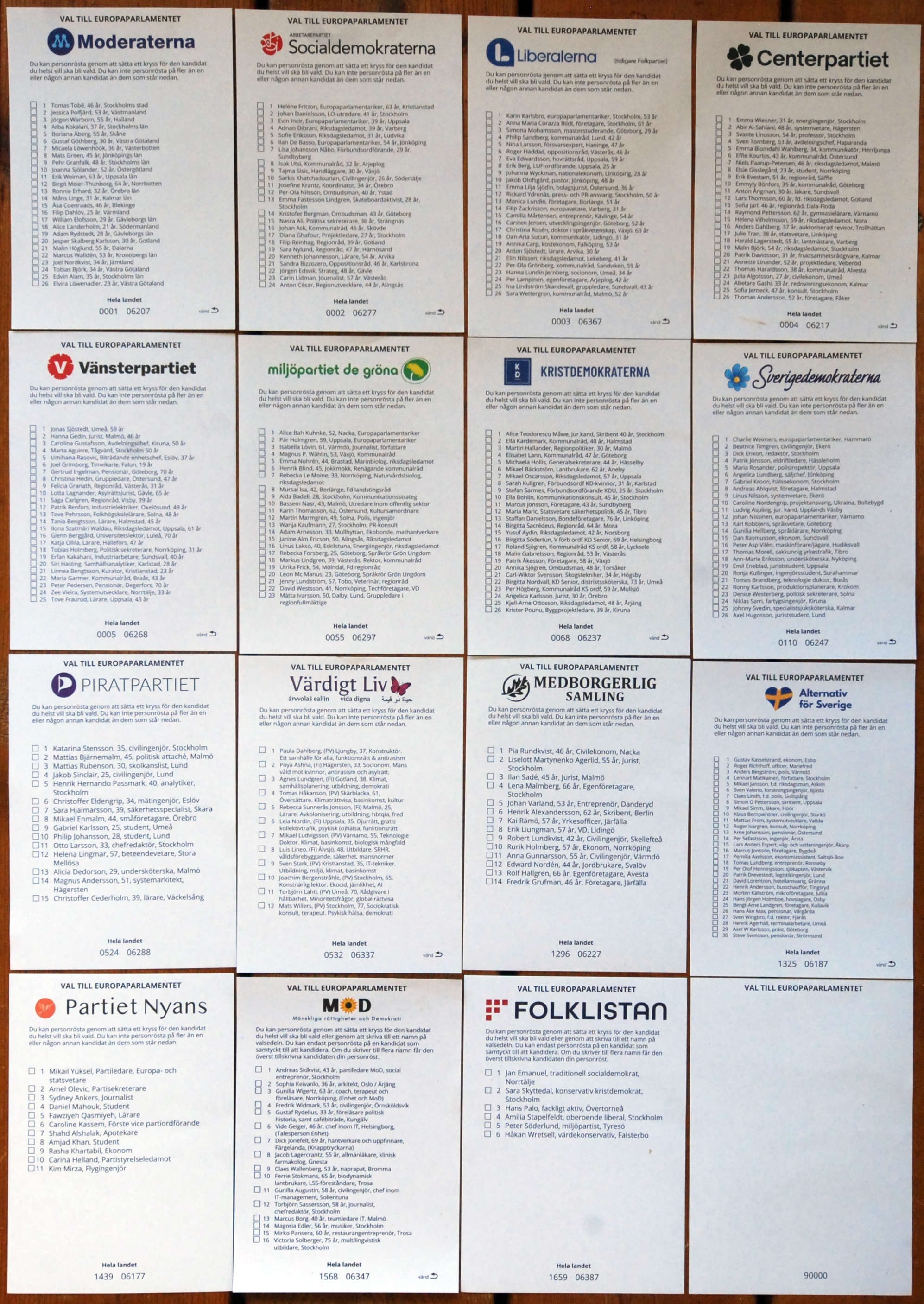
Some of the ballot papers for the elections to the EU Parliament in Sweden in 2024

102 parties/lists took part in the 2024 European Parliament in Sweden, the highest in any EU country. The following lists all parties which got over 1,000 votes.

Party		European Party	Group	2019 result	Top candidate
S	Swedish Social Democratic Party	PES	S&D	23.5	Heléne Fritzon
M	Moderate Party	EPP	EPP	16.8	Tomas Tobé
SD	Sweden Democrats	ECR	ECR	15.3	Charlie Weimers
MP	Green Party	EGP	Greens/EFA	11.5	Alice Bah Kuhnke
C	Centre Party	ALDE	RE	10.8	Emma Wiesner
KD	Christian Democrats	EPP	EPP	8.6	Alice Teodorescu Måwe
V	Left Party	MLP	The Left	6.8	Jonas Sjöstedt
L	Liberals	ALDE	RE	4.1	Karin Karlsbro
FI−PV	Feminist Initiative−Turning Point Party	—N/a		0.9 (Note: Combined performance of the two parties, that run separately in 2019.)	Paula Dahlberg
PP	Pirate Party	PPEU	—N/a	0.6	Katarina Stensson
AFS	Alternative for Sweden	—N/a		0.5	Gustav Kasselstrand
MED	Citizens' Coalition	—N/a		0.2	Pia Rundkvist
SKP	Communist Party of Sweden	ECA	—N/a	0.0	Martin Tairi
F	Folklistan	—N/a	EPP	—N/a	Jan Emanuel
PNy	Nuance Party	FPP	—N/a		Mikail Yüksel
KA	Climate Alliance	—N/a			Helen Wahlgren
MoD	Human Rights and Democracy	—N/a			Andreas Sidkvist
KrVP	Christian Values Party	—N/a			Mats Selander
Swexit	Swexit	—N/a			Ulf Ström

== Voting advice applications ==
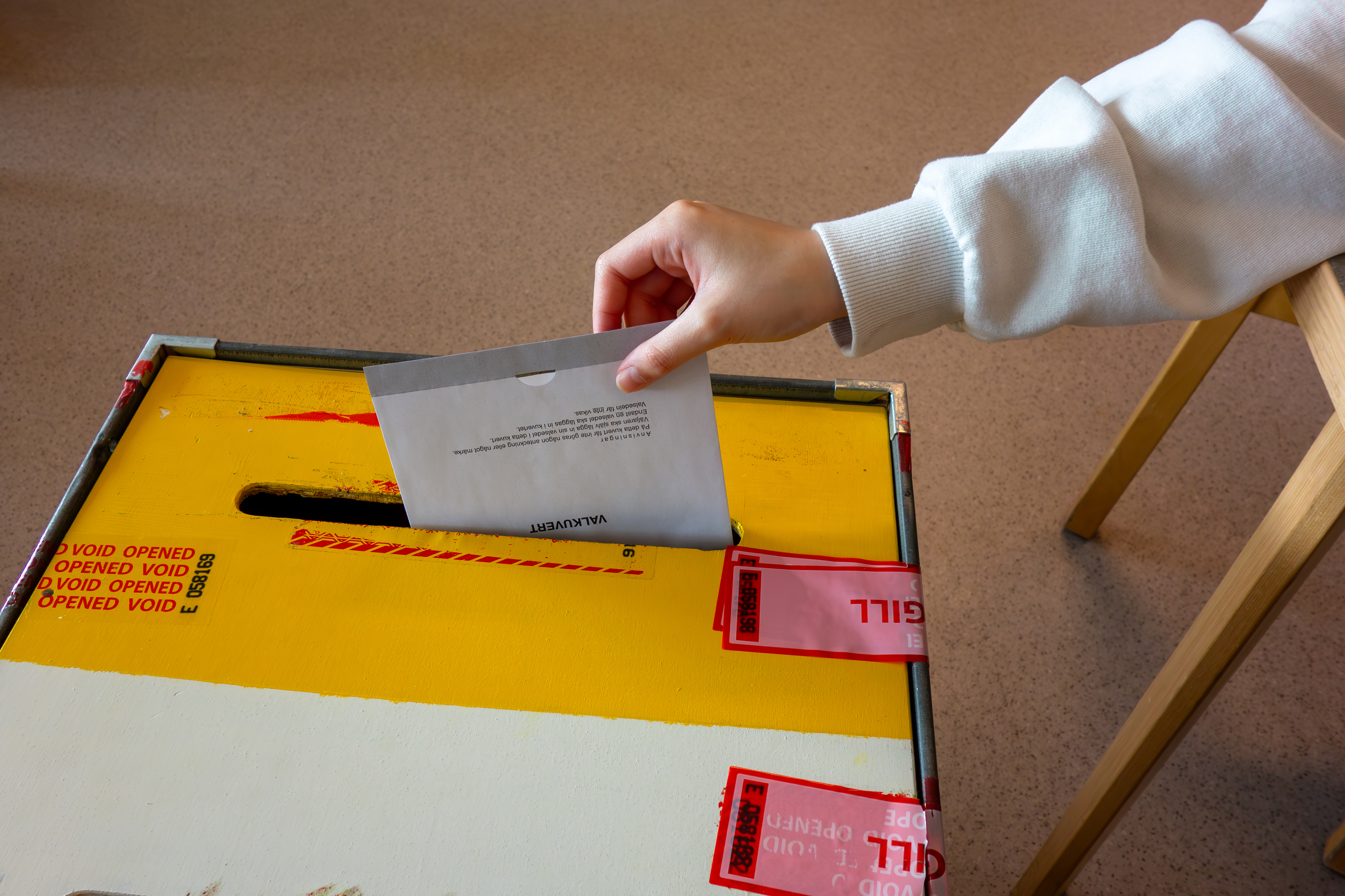
An envelope containing a ballot is dropped into a ballot box by a voting official at the 2024 EU election in Brastad, Sweden.

In Sweden, SVT's European election compass (EU-val Valkompass 2024) allows users to find the party and the candidates who best matches their convictions through 30 different statements across a range of issues.

== Opinion polls ==
Polling execution			Parties									
Polling firm	Fieldwork date	Sample size	V Left	S S&D	MP G/EFA	C Renew	L Renew	M EPP	KD EPP	SD ECR	Oth.	Lead
Demoskop	23 May–1 Jun 2024	3,222	10.0; 2	25.2; 6	11.3; 3	5.7; 1	3.1; 0	18.0; 4	5.5; 1	18.6; 4	2.7; 0	6.6
Novus	2–29 May 2024	2,325	10.0; 2	29.4; 7	11.0; 2	4.7; 1	5.1; 1	15.5; 4	3.8; 0	19.1; 4	1.3; 0	10.3
Verian	22–28 May 2024	1,000	9.5; 2	25.1; 6	10.6; 2	4.9; 1	4.7; 1	17.2; 4	5.4; 1	19.6; 4	3.1; 0	5.5
Demoskop	11–20 May 2024	2,994	8.7; 2	27.5; 7	9.8; 2	4.6; 1	2.8; 0	18.5; 4	3.9; 0	19.9; 5	4.3; 0	7.6
Ipsos	7–19 May 2024	1,646	7.6; 2	29.6; 7	10.8; 3	3.6; 0	4.7; 1	19.1; 4	3.9; 0	17.8; 4	2.9; 0	10.5
Demoskop	24 Apr–7 May 2024	3,970	8.7; 2	28.5; 6	9.2; 2	4.6; 1	3.2; 0	17.3; 4	4.4; 1	19.9; 5	4.2; 0	8.6
Verian	25–30 Apr 2024	1,900	8.8; 2	29.7; 7	9.5; 2	4.5; 1	3.7; 0	18.3; 4	4.2; 1	17.2; 4	4.2; 0	11.4
Novus	1–28 Apr 2024	2,311	8.5; 2	31.1; 8	10.3; 2	3.6; 0	3.8; 0	17.7; 4	3.5; 0	18.8; 5	2.6; 0	12.3
Indikator Opinion	28 Mar – 22 Apr 2024	6,943	8.1; 2	32.3; 8	9.7; 2	4.6; 1	3.3; 0	19.0; 4	2.3; 0	18.6; 4	2.1; 0	12.9
Ipsos	23 Feb – 5 Mar 2024	1,003	9.6; 2	30.4; 6	8.3; 2	7.0; 1	4.7; 1	16.4; 4	4.5; 1	17.5; 4	1.5; 0	12.9
Novus	19 Feb – 3 Mar 2024	504	7.3; 2	32.4; 7	8.0; 2	4.6; 1	3.3; 0	18.1; 4	4.2; 1	20.5; 4	1.7; 0	11.9
2022 general election	11 Sep 2022	–	6.8; 1	30.3; 7	5.1; 1	6.7; 1	4.6; 1	19.1; 4	5.3; 1	20.5; 5	1.5; 0	9.8
2019 EP election	26 May 2019	–	6.8; 1	23.5; 5	11.5; 3	10.8; 2	4.1; 1	16.8; 4	8.6; 2	15.3; 3	2.5; 0	6.7

== Results ==
Party	Votes	%	Seats	+/–
Swedish Social Democratic Party	1,039,676	24.77	5	0
Moderate Party	736,079	17.53	4	0
Green Party	581,322	13.85	3	0
Sweden Democrats	552,920	13.17	3	0
Left Party	464,166	11.06	2	+1
Centre Party	306,227	7.29	2	0
Christian Democrats	239,530	5.71	1	–1
Liberals	183,675	4.38	1	0
Folklistan	25,901	0.62	0	New
Alternative for Sweden	17,049	0.41	0	0
Pirate Party	15,403	0.37	0	0
Citizens' Coalition	12,699	0.30	0	0
Human Rights and Democracy	8,057	0.19	0	New
Christian Values Party	3,896	0.09	0	0
Dignified Life (FI−PV)	2,545	0.06	0	0
Swexit	2,285	0.05	0	New
Nuance Party	1,772	0.04	0	New
Communist Party of Sweden	1,629	0.04	0	0
Climate Alliance	1,200	0.03	0	New
Other parties	1,980	0.05	0	0
Total	4,198,011	100.00	21	0
Valid votes	4,198,011	99.00		
Invalid/blank votes	42,448	1.00		
Total votes	4,240,459	100.00		
Registered voters/turnout	7,942,272	53.39		
Source: Valmyndigheten

== Elected delegation ==
The table shows the detailed composition of the Swedish seats at the European Parliament 2024–2029.

EP Group	Seats	Party	Seats	MEPs
Progressive Alliance of Socialists and Democrats	5 / 21	Swedish Social Democratic Party	5	Heléne Fritzon; Johan Danielsson; Evin Incir; Adnan Dibrani; Sofie Eriksson
European People's Party	5 / 21	Moderate Party	4	Tomas Tobé; Jessica Polfjärd; Jörgen Warborn; Arba Kokalari
European People's Party	5 / 21	Christian Democrats	1	Alice Teodorescu Måwe
Greens–European Free Alliance	3 / 21	Green Party	3	Alice Bah Kuhnke; Pär Holmgren; Isabella Lövin
European Conservatives and Reformists	3 / 21	Sweden Democrats	3	Charlie Weimers; Beatrice Timgren; Dick Erixon
Renew Europe	3 / 21	Centre Party	2	Emma Wiesner; Abir Al-Sahlani
Renew Europe	3 / 21	Liberals	1	Karin Karlsbro
The Left in the European Parliament – GUE/NGL	2 / 21	Left Party	2	Jonas Sjöstedt; Hanna Gedin
Total			21	
Source: Valmyndigheten
