= List of MEPs who stood down at the 2024 European Parliament election =

List

This is a list of Members of the European Parliament (MEPs) who held seats at the end of the Ninth European Parliament who did not stand for re-election in the 2024 European Parliament election.

== MEPs not standing for re-election ==
=== Belgium ===
Name	Party	EP Group	First elected	Terms	Date announced	Source
Geert Bourgeois	N-VA	ECR	2019	1	8 October 2021	
Guy Verhofstadt	Open Vld	RE	2009	3	8 May 2023	
Gerolf Annemans	Vlaams Belang	ID	2014	2	6 October 2023	

=== Czech Republic ===
Name	Party	Date announced	Source
Jan Zahradil	Civic Democratic Party (ECR)	5 June 2023	
Radka Maxová	Independent (S&D)	31 October 2023	
Stanislav Polčák	Mayors and Independents (EPP)	3 January 2024	
Evžen Tošenovský	Civic Democratic Party (ECR)	5 April 2024	

=== Denmark ===
Departing MEP	Party	EP Group	First elected	Terms	Date announced
Nikolaj Villumsen	Red–Green	The Left	2019	1	N/A (Note: Villumsen is ineligible to stand as a candidate for the party, due to the party's rotation principle.)
Erik Poulsen	Venstre	RE	2019 (Note: Poulsen entered the European Parliament as a substitute following the 2022 Danish general election.)	1	16 November 2022
Karen Melchior	Independent	RE	2019	1	10 August 2022
Margrete Auken	Green Left	Greens/EFA	2004	4	1 April 2023
Morten Helveg Petersen	Social Liberals	RE	2014	2	3 June 2023
Pernille Weiss	Conservatives	EPP	2019	1	23 September 2023

=== Estonia ===
Departing MEP	Party	EP Group	First elected	Date announced
Andrus Ansip	Reform	RE	2019	24 April 2024

=== Finland ===
Name	Party	Date announced	Source
Heidi Hautala	Green League	9 January 2024	
Silvia Modig	Left Alliance	6 February 2024	
Alviina Alametsä	Green League	16 February 2024	
Petri Sarvamaa	National Coalition Party		
Miapetra Kumpula-Natri	Social Democratic Party		
Mauri Pekkarinen	Centre Party		
Nils Torvalds	Swedish People's Party		

=== Hungary ===
Name	Party	Date announced	Source
István Ujhelyi	Opportunity Community	2 June 2023	
László Trócsányi	Fidesz	22 January 2024	
Andor Deli	Fidesz	4 April 2024	
Balázs Hidvéghi	Fidesz	4 April 2024	
Andrea Bocskor	Fidesz	4 April 2024	
Lívia Járóka	Fidesz	4 April 2024	
Attila Ara-Kovács	Democratic Coalition	25 April 2024	

=== Ireland ===
Constituency	Departing MEP	Party	EP Group	First elected	Date announced
South	Deirdre Clune	Fine Gael	EPP	2014	15 November 2023
Dublin	Frances Fitzgerald	Fine Gael	EPP	2019	6 November 2023
Midlands–North-West	Colm Markey	Fine Gael	EPP	2020	23 March 2024

=== Italy ===
Constituency	Departing MEP	Party	EP Group	First elected	Terms	Date announced
North-West Italy	Mercedes Bresso	Democratic Party	S&D	2004	3	22 May 2023
North-East Italy	Achille Variati	Democratic Party	S&D	2022	1	19 January 2024
North-West Italy	Marco Zanni	League	ID	2014	2	28 February 2024
Southern Italy	Laura Ferrara	Five Star Movement	NI	2014	2	15 March 2024
Italian Islands	Ignazio Corrao	Independent	Greens/EFA	2014	2	9 April 2024
North-West Italy	Lara Comi	Forza Italia	EPP	2009	3	17 April 2024
North-East Italy	Paolo De Castro	Democratic Party	S&D	2009	3	20 April 2024
North-East Italy	Gianantonio Da Re	League	ID	2019	1	23 April 2024
Central Italy	Matteo Adinolfi	League	ID	2019	1	23 April 2024
Central Italy	Nicola Danti	Italia Viva	RE	2014	2	1 May 2024
Southern Italy	Massimo Casanova	League	ID	2019	1	2 May 2024
North-West Italy	Marco Campomenosi	League	ID	2019	1	
Central Italy	Antonio Maria Rinaldi	League	ID	2019	1	
Italian Islands	Francesca Donato	Christian Democracy	NI	2019	1	
North-West Italy	Giuliano Pisapia	Independent	S&D	2019	1	
Southern Italy	Franco Roberti	Democratic Party	S&D	2019	1	
Southern Italy	Andrea Cozzolino	Democratic Party	NI	2009	3	
North-West Italy	Tiziana Beghin	Five Star Movement	NI	2014	2	
North-East Italy	Marco Zullo	Independent	RE	2014	2	
North-East Italy	Fabio Massimo Castaldo	Action	RE	2014	2	
Italian Islands	Dino Giarrusso	Independent	NI	2019	1	
North-East Italy	Paola Ghidoni	League	ID	2022	1	
Southern Italy	Elisabetta De Blasis	Brothers of Italy	ECR	2022	1	

=== Latvia ===
Name	Party	First elected	Terms	Date announced	Source
Andris Ameriks	Honor to serve Riga	2019	1	9 February 2024	
Tatjana Ždanoka (Note: Inelegible to run for reelection.)	Latvian Russian Union	2004	4	9 February 2024	

=== Malta ===
Departing MEP	Party	EP Group	First elected	Date announced
Josianne Cutajar	Labour	S&D	2019	15 January 2024
Cyrus Engerer	Labour	S&D	2020	27 April 2024
Alfred Sant	Labour	S&D	2014	12 March 2021

=== Sweden ===
Name	Party	First elected	Terms	Date announced	Source
Peter Lundgren	Independent (Note: Elected from Sweden Democrats, left the party in February 2022)	2014	2	19 March 2022	
Malin Björk	Left Party	2014	2	22 August 2023	
David Lega	Christian Democrats	2019	1	13 October 2023	
Jakop Dalunde	Green Party	2016 (Note: Replaced Peter Eriksson)	2	18 October 2023	
Erik Bergkvist	Swedish Social Democratic Party	2019	1	17 November 2023	
Carina Ohlsson	Swedish Social Democratic Party	2022 (Note: Replaced Jytte Guteland)	1	17 November 2023	
Linus Glanzelius	Swedish Social Democratic Party	2024 (Note: Replaced Erik Bergkvist who had died in office.)	1	17 November 2023	
