= Glanzelius =

Glanzelius is a surname. Notable people with the surname include:

- Anton Glanzelius (born 1974), Swedish actor
- Linus Glanzelius, Swedish politician
