= Nuance Party =

Political party in Sweden

Nuance Party Partiet Nyans
- Founder: Mikail Yüksel
- Founded: 2019
- Split from: Centre Party
- Ideology: Multiculturalism; Turkophilia; Islamism; Muslim minority interests
- European political alliance: Free Palestine Party

Website
- www.partietnyans.se

The Nuance Party (Swedish: Partiet Nyans) is a political party in Sweden. It was founded in 2019 with the aim of representing minority groups with foreign backgrounds, especially the country's Muslim population. In the 2022 local election, the party won three municipal seats, one in Landskrona and two in Botkyrka. The party has been criticized due to allegedly defending former ISIS members. The leader of the party has stated his defence as being based on human rights and the lack of public evidence against the alleged offenders.

== History ==
The Nuance Party was founded in August 2019 by Mikail Yüksel, a Turkish-born politician expelled from the Centre Party for alleged links to the Turkish ultranationalist group the Grey Wolves. In his founding statement, he said that Islamophobia should be a criminal offence and that Sweden's Muslims should have a constitutional definition as a minority. The party was launched in September 2019 and registered with Sweden's Election Authority in October 2019 to contest the 2022 Swedish general election, as well as the 2024 European Parliament election in Sweden.

Ahead of the 2022 election, Maria Malmer Stenergard of the Moderate Party and Morgan Johansson of the Social Democrats raised serious concerns about the Nuance Party.

=== Controversies ===
Dagens Nyheter, Sweden's newspaper of record, reported in July 2022 that one in every seven of the party's electoral candidates was a convicted criminal. In 2024 a politician of the party, Hamza Akacha, was convicted for possession of child pornography.

In August 2022, Scania newspapers Helsingborgs Dagblad and Sydsvenskan found that five of Nuance's 25 candidates in the county had spread hate speech about Jews and Shia Muslims, COVID-19 misinformation, or 9/11 conspiracy theories. Three of the candidates were expelled due to the findings.

== Ideology ==
Political scientists Sofie Blombäck and Magnus Ranstorp have said that The Nuance Party's ideology is fundamentally based on identity politics. Kurdo Baksi, an anti-racist immigrant to Sweden from Turkey, has said Partiet Nyans is populist and attracts Islamists, something the party refutes. Swedish political scientist Henrik Ekengren Oscarsson said the party engages in client politics. Sofie Blombäck, a political scientist from Mid Sweden University, said that the party is unusual because religious-based parties are rare in Sweden. The Christian Democrats, for example, is smaller than its other European counterparts like the Germany's Christian Democratic Union, The Netherlands' Christian Democratic Appeal, or Spain's People's Party. Blombäck compared the Nuance Party to DENK, a minority-focused party in the Netherlands, and said that while it could enter local politics in Malmö, it was unlikely to join the Riksdag.

In 2022, the party erected a billboard in Kulu, located in Turkey's Konya province, which is the ancestral origin for a majority of Sweden's Turkish community. The billboard described itself as "the only Turkey-friendly party that distances itself from terrorist organisations".

== Platform ==
The Nuance Party accuses Swedish social services of "forcing" Muslim children into non-Muslim foster care to facilitate assimilation. These accusations have been picked up by foreign broadcasters including TRT World and Al Jazeera and rejected as false in Sweden. The party supports criminalising Quran desecration, such as the public burnings by activist Rasmus Paludan that preceded the 2022 Sweden riots that April. The party wants Skåne County to burn down Lars Vilks' large sculpture Nimis because of Vilks' depiction of Muhammed as a roundabout dog.

The party criticised a report by the Center for Knowledge and Security (CKS) in Borås which they claimed gave a one-sided and overly negative picture about Somalis. Yüksel expressed a desire to shut down CKS as a result.

The party is supportive of the European Union.

=== Party goals ===
The most important goals according to the party website is:

- Abolish employment fees for new immigrants and people under the age of 25
- Anonymous application for rental homes
- Compulsory Swedish-language education for new immigrants
- Criminalise Bosnian genocide denial
- Introduce criminal classifications for Islamophobia and Christophobia
- Criminalise Quran desecration
- Legalize hijab in all public sectors, removing veil bans
- Race-based affirmative action in both public and private job sectors
- Recognize Muslims and blacks as official minority groups
- Reduce VAT rates by 50%
- Sanction countries that do not take in refugees
- Sanction and withdraw recognition of Israel
- Remove Hamas from the EU terrorist list
- Accession of Bosnia and Herzegovina and Turkey in the European Union
- Make it a right to receive news from authorities in foreign languages

== Election results ==
=== Riksdag ===
In the 2022 Swedish general election, the Nuance Party came ninth with 0.44% of the vote, the highest of any party that did not enter parliament. The party claimed 2.1% of the vote in Malmö, 1.14% in Gothenburg and 0.76% in Stockholm. They received very high vote shares in some Muslim-dense suburbs, including 21.22% in Västra Hisingen, Svarte Mosse (Biskopsgården, Gothenburg), 26.36% in Spånga 27 Rinkeby mellersta (Rinkeby, Stockholm) and 28.11% in Rosengård Centrum (Malmö). Political scientist Anders Sannerstedt has said the rise of the Nuance Party may be one reason the left bloc lost.

Election	Votes	%	Seats	+/-	Government
2022	28,352	0.4 (#9)	0 / 349	New	No seats
2026	1,069	0.02 (#18)	0 / 349	New	No seats

=== Regional and local ===
In 2022, the party received 2.44% of the votes in the Landskrona Municipality election, and 2.03% of the votes in Botkyrka Municipality, putting them above the 2% minimum needed for a seat on the councils. In the 2026 election, they lost their seats in both municipality councils, receiving 1.42% of the votes in Botkyrka and 0.08% in Landskrona.

=== European Parliament ===
Election	List leader	Votes	%	Seats	+/–	EP Group
2024	Mikail Yüksel	1,772	0.04 (#17)	0 / 21	New	–

== See also ==
- Ethnic party
- Denk (political party)
- Identity politics
- Islamophobia in Sweden
- List of political parties in Sweden
- Minor political parties in Sweden and their results in parliamentary elections
