= Erixon =

Erixon is a surname. Notable people with the surname include:

- Christofer Erixon (born 1987), Swedish songwriter and composer
- Dick Erixon (born 1962), Swedish writer
- Jan Erixon (born 1962), Swedish ice hockey player
- Sebastian Erixon (born 1989), Swedish ice hockey player
- Stefan Erixon (born 1977), Swedish bandy player
- Tim Erixon (born 1991), Swedish ice hockey player
