= Hanna Gedin =

Swedish politician (born 1978)

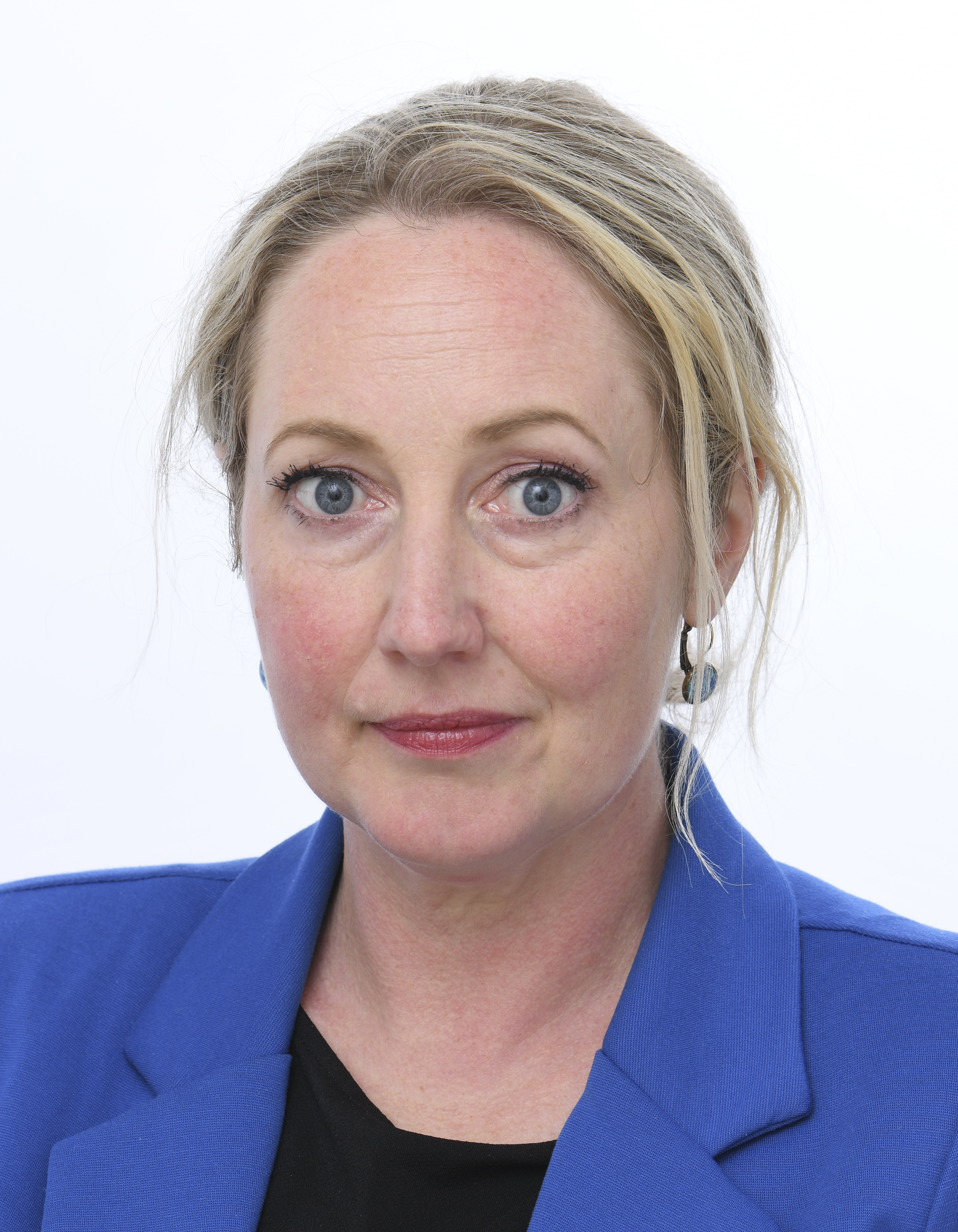
- Official portrait, 2024

Member of the European Parliament
- Incumbent
- Assumed office 16 July 2024
- Constituency: Sweden

Personal details
- Born: 11 March 1978 (age 48)
- Party: Left Party

Hanna Gedin (born 11 March 1978) is a Swedish politician and MEP for the Left Party. She served as deputy party secretary for five years, leaving the position in December 2022. She was elected as MEP in the 2024 European Parliament election.

Gedin was chosen as the second candidate for the Left Party's list for the 2024 European Parliament election in Sweden. Gedin is a member of the Committee on the Internal Market and Consumer Protection, as well as a substitute member of the Committee on Industry, Research and Energy and of the Committee on Women’s Rights and Gender Equality.

Gedin was mentioned as a potential candidate for party leader to follow Jonas Sjöstedt.

Gedin was born in 1978 on the Scanian countryside and grew up on Norra Fäladen in Lund. She joined the Left Party at age 15.

In 2026, Gedin and fellow MEP Jonas Sjöstedt were barred by the Israeli government from entering the country, citing anti-Israel activities.
