= Emma Ytterell =

Swedish politician (born 1992)

Emma Ytterell MEP
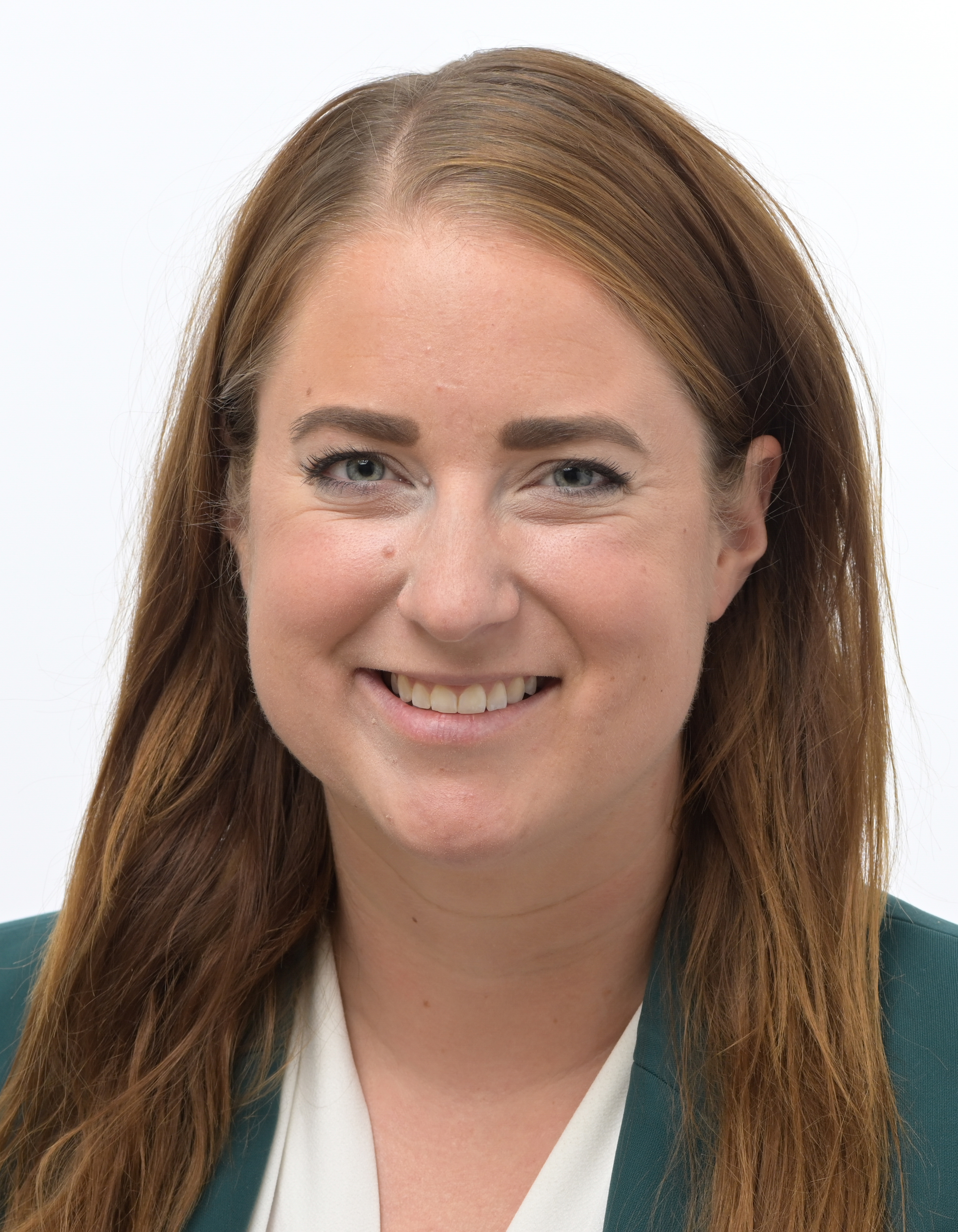

Member of the European Parliament for Sweden
- Incumbent
- Assumed office 4 February 2021
- Parliamentary group: Renew Europe

Personal details
- Born: Emma Wiesner; 11 November 1992 (age 34) Västerås, Sweden
- Party: Centre
- Education: Uppsala University
- Occupation: Engineer, politician

Emma Ytterell (née Wiesner; born 11 November 1992) is a Swedish politician for the Centre Party, and former energy systems engineer. Ytterell has been a Member of the European Parliament since 4 February 2021.

== Political career ==
Ytterell started her political career as a 13 year old, after having seen Al Gore's film An Inconvenient Truth. After realizing that the environmental movement was her major political issue she chose to join the green liberal Centre Party, where she began regional chairman for the youth wing.

In the run-up to the 2019 European Parliament election, Ytterell was third on the Centre party list with a campaign slogan to bring "new energy to Europe" and wanting to increase the renewable energy in the union. The Centre party won two places in the election and even though Ytterell received more than 20,683 votes, it was not enough to reach over the threshold.

=== 2021–present: Member of the European Parliament ===
On 11 December 2020, it was announced that Ytterell was going to replace Fredrick Federley's seat in the European Parliament, after his resignation the same day. At 28 years of age, she became Sweden’s youngest member of the European Parliament.

In parliament Ytterell is a full member of the Committee on the Environment, Public Health and Food Safety and the Committee on Fisheries. She is also a substitute member of the Industry, Research and Energy committee (ITRE), the European Parliament Committee on Agriculture and Rural Development and the Special Committee for the Protection of Animals in Transport (ANIT)

== Personal life ==
In October 2026, she announced on Instagram that she had married Anthon Ytterell and changed her social media handles from "Emma Wiesner" to "Emma Ytterell (fd. Wiesner)".
