= Jan Emanuel =

Swedish politician (born 1974)

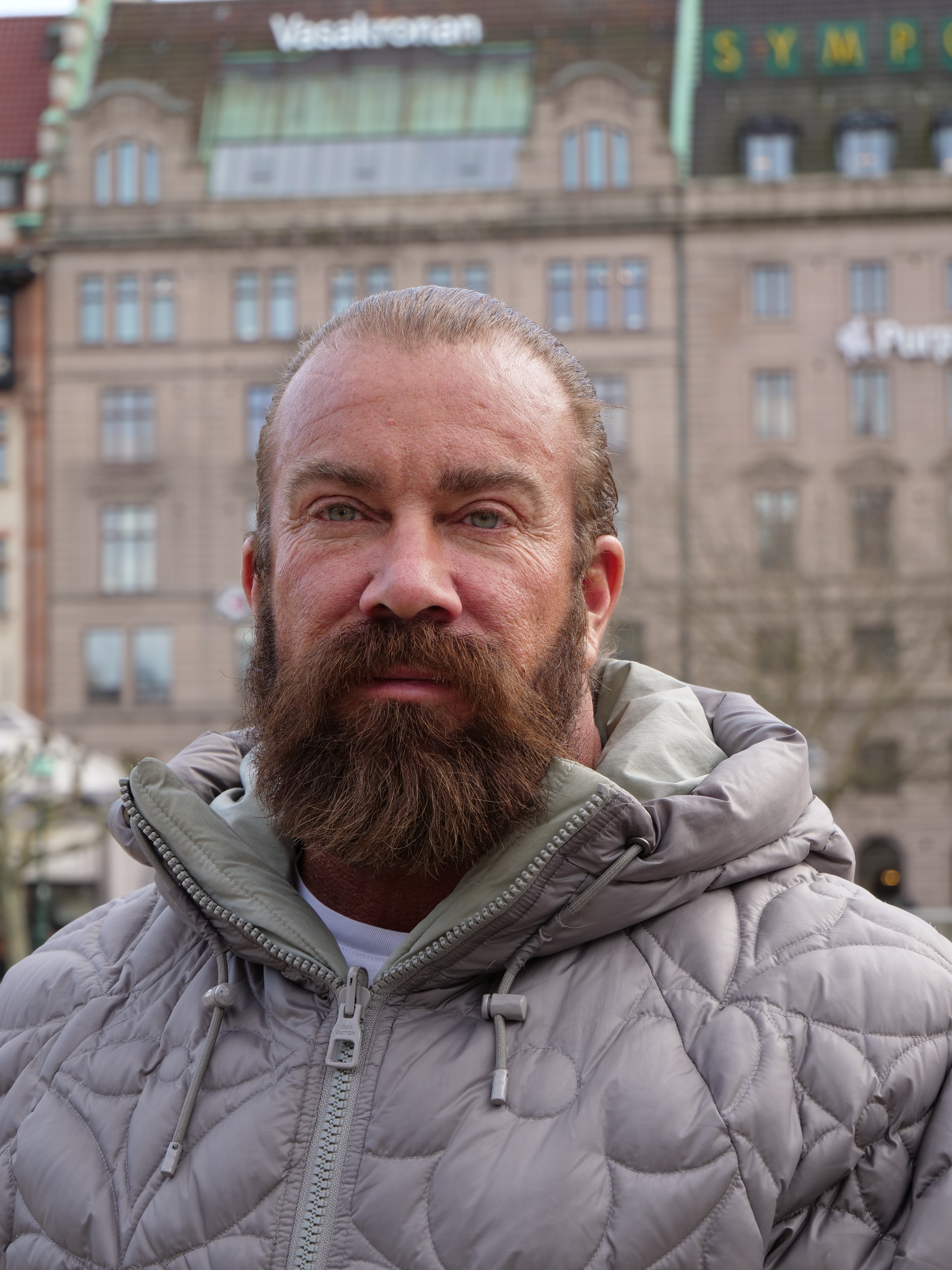
- Jan Emanuel in 2022

Member of the Riksdag
- In office 11 March 2009 – 4 October 2010
- Constituency: Stockholm County
- In office 14 December 2008 – 1 February 2009
- Constituency: Stockholm County
- In office 11 February 2008 – 13 April 2008
- Constituency: Stockholm County
- In office 30 September 2002 – 6 October 2006
- Constituency: Stockholm County

Personal details
- Born: 2 May 1974 (age 52)
- Party: Social Democratic (1998–2024; 2024–)
- Other political affiliations: Folklistan/The People's List (2024)
- A: Was an electoral alliance for the 2024 European Parliament election in Sweden.

Jan Emanuel (born Jan Emanuel Johansson, 2 May 1974) is a Swedish healthcare entrepreneur, Social Democratic politician and Member of Parliament (MP) from 2002 to 2006, who also held seats in the Riksdagen as a replacement at different times (2006, 2008 and 2009). He was again MP between March 2009 and October 2010, this time as a replacement for Pär Nuder. He has sat on the Social Committee, Parliamentary Committees as well as the foreign ministry. He is reputed to be the Social Democratic MP who put forward the highest number motions during his time at the Riksdagen. He was MP representing the Norrtälje municipality council between 1998 and 2010.

Emanuel participated in the reality series Expedition Robinson, broadcast on SVT in 2001, which he ended up winning for a prize of SEK 500,000. He has received several awards for his achievements, such as "Super-entrepreneur of the Year" by the Veckans Affärer paper, which he bagged for four years in a row between 2007 and 2010. In February 2012, he was investigated by the Economic Crime Unit, and accused of tax fraud and accounting offences. In June 2013, Emanuel was acquitted of the tax fraud charge but found guilty at Gotlands courts of obstruction of tax regulations, despite his denial of accounting offences.

== Biography ==
=== Early life ===
His father, Alf Ohlsson, was a part-owner of the company Alf Ohlsson, Av Egen Kraft/ELU AB. In 2001, Emanuel participated in a reality series called Expedition Robinson, which was broadcast on Sveriges Television (SVT). He ended up as the series' winner and used his prize money of SEK 500,000 to invest in his own business as well as donating some to Förbundet Djurens Rätt.

=== Politics ===
In 1998, Emanuel was elected to the Norrtälje municipality council. In that year's election, he managed to get more votes in Norrtälje than any of the other candidates. In November 2013, it was revealed that Emanuel had left politics to have more time to focus on his companies and businesses. In December of the same year, Norrtelje Tidning named him one of the most influential persons in Sweden.

Besides winning his candidature in Norrtälje, Emanuel also participated in the Riksdagen elections of the Social Democratic Party for the Stockholm constituency. He, however, was not as successful there as he got only 135 (0.007%) of the total votes cast. In 2002, a year after winning Expedition Robinson, Emanuel contested another election to be elected into the Riksdagen. The elections ended with Emanuel again not getting enough votes, but he was still elected into the Riksdagen as he was already in another elected seat for the Riksdagen. No other candidate got enough votes to get him off that seat.

During his campaign to yet again be elected into the Norrtälje municipality council in 2010, Emanuel illegally used the Harley-Davidson logotype which he had redone with a message to voters. This action was brought up in the Norrtelje Tidning on 9 September 2010, where it was said to be "incredibly distasteful". Nonetheless, his campaign succeeded and he got the highest number of votes among all constituencies for the Social Democrats.

Emanuel was a member of the Riksdagen Social Committee between 2002 and 2006, and the Law Committee between 2003 and 2006. He has also, for shorter periods, sat on the Justice Committee as well as the Constitutional Committee and that of the foreign ministry. Emanuel was the most active among the Stockholm Social Democratic MPs in pushing through motions in the Riksdagen. Emanuel's motions mostly concerned animal protection, animal welfare and social issues. During his time in the Riksdagen, Emanuel raised the issue of castration of sexual offenders. Emanuel has also made suggestions that reality series and other "unhealthy shows" should be made to pay higher taxes on their productions.

In 2005, Emanuel put forward a motion that all asylum seekers should be put through a mandatory HIV-test, which earned him criticism from Swedish Amnesty. Emanuel said that his suggestion arose from reviewing statistics of newly discovered HIV cases. He failed to be re-elected into the Riksdagen in 2006 – an election in which he became noted for using Bert Karlsson (an erstwhile leader of the right-wing party Ny Demokrati) as an advisor.

In 2021, Emanuel has stated his relationship with the Social Democrats has become cold and revealed that he no longer votes for them. According to him, the party has abandoned classical social democracy and abandoned the workers, and that "they're no longer the party that I joined". He also stated that he's in internal opposition within the party and that he's a "conservative leftist" and doesn't have a party which represents him.

He appeared on stage alongside Jimmie Åkesson during a Sweden Democrats campaign rally as part of their 2026 election campaign. Fellow conservative politician Arin Karapet encouraged him to 'come out of the closet' and become a Sweden Democrat.

==== Founding of Folklistan (The People's List) ====
On 8 April 2024, Jan Emanuel and former Christian Democrats and independent politician Sara Skyttedal founded Folklistan (The People's List), with the intention of running candidates for the upcoming 2024 European Parliament elections. Following this, he left the Social Democrats, but returned after the elections.

== Personal life ==
Emanuel is married and has two children.
