= Jörgen Warborn =

Swedish politician (born 1969)

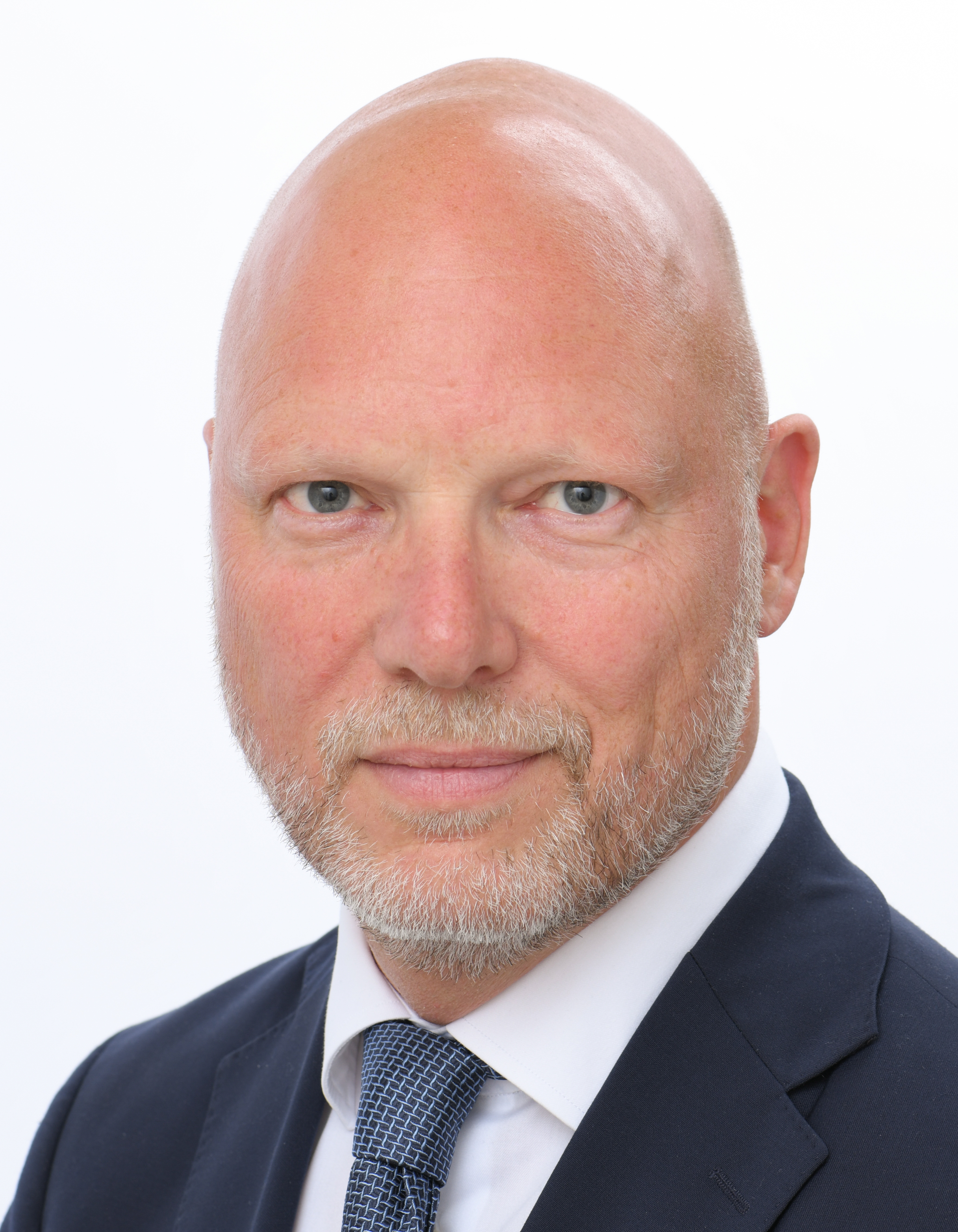

Member of the European Parliament
- Incumbent
- Assumed office 2 July 2019
- Constituency: Sweden

Member of the Riksdag
- In office 29 September 2014 – 1 July 2019
- Succeeded by: Helena Storckenfeldt
- Constituency: Halland County

Mayor of Varberg Municipality
- In office 1 January 2011 – 31 December 2014
- Preceded by: Gösta Bergenheim
- Succeeded by: Ann-Charlotte Stenkil

Personal details
- Born: 23 January 1969 (age 57) Varberg, Sweden
- Party: Moderate Party
- Spouse: Titti Warborn
- Children: 3
- Occupation: Entrepreneur, politician

Jörgen Tage Wilhelm Warborn (born 23 January 1969) is a Swedish entrepreneur and politician of the Moderate Party who has been serving as Member of the European Parliament since the 2019 elections.

In April 2024, Warborn was elected as president of SME Global, an international network for small- and medium sized business. In september 2024, Warborn was also elected as president of SME Europe, the biggest political organisation in Europe that operates for the rights of small and medium sized enterprises.

Prior to entering European politics, Warborn was Mayor of Varberg Municipality from the 2010 general election until his election to the Riksdag in 2014. He was re-elected to the Riksdag in 2018.

== Education and early career ==
Warborn studied economics and leadership at the International University of Monaco, international relations at the London School of Economics, and entrepreneurship at Babson College in Boston.

Warborn started his first business at the age of 17 and has since then started and managed several small business, primarily in the IT and marketing sector.

== Political career ==
=== Career in national politics ===
Warborn's political commitment grew in the early 1990s, when he wanted Sweden to become part of the European Union. In the Swedish 1994 referendum on EU membership, Warborn was the county campaign leader for the "Yes"-campaign, that organized 14 political parties and NGOs in Halland County.

After studying abroad, Warborn moved back to Varberg in 2005 and became active in the Moderate Party. He became mayor of Varberg in 2010 and a member of parliament in 2014. In addition to his role in parliament, Warborn briefly served as member of the Swedish delegation to the Parliamentary Assembly of the Council of Europe in 2019.

Since 2016, Warborn has been national chairman of the Moderate Party's business council.

=== Member of the European Parliament 2019 - 2029 ===
In parliament, Warborn serves as coordinator and spokesperson for the European People's Party in the Committee on International Trade; Politico Europe has named him as the most free trade friendly politician in the European Parliament.

From 2021 to 2022, Warborn was the rapporteur for the European Commission’s plan to reduce shipping emissions. Since 2024, he has been the rapporteur on the European Union's environmental and corporate sustainability rules.

In addition to his committee assignments, Warborn is part of the European Parliament Intergroup on Small and Medium-Sized Enterprises (SMEs).

On 22 of October 2023, he was elected as one of the top candidates of the Moderate Party for the European elections on 9 June 2024.

Warborn co-chairs the European People's Party's (EPP) Trade Ministerial Meeting, which brings together EPP trade ministers ahead of meetings of the Foreign Affairs Council (Trade) to coordinate positions and discuss longer-term trade policy.

== Recognition ==
In March 2022, IDG and Tech Sweden named Warborn as one of the most influential in tech and AI in Sweden.

== Personal life ==
Warborn lives in Varberg on the Swedish west coast. He is since 2008 married to Titti Warborn, and the couple have three children. His wife is also a small business entrepreneur, managing a furniture store.

== Rapporteur on Omnibus I ==
Jörgen Warborn was appointed rapporteur in 2025 on Omnibus I, simplifying CSRD and CSDDD. Cutting the biggest reporting cost in the history of the European Union.
