= Pär Holmgren =

Swedish meteorologist and politician

Pär Holmgren MEP
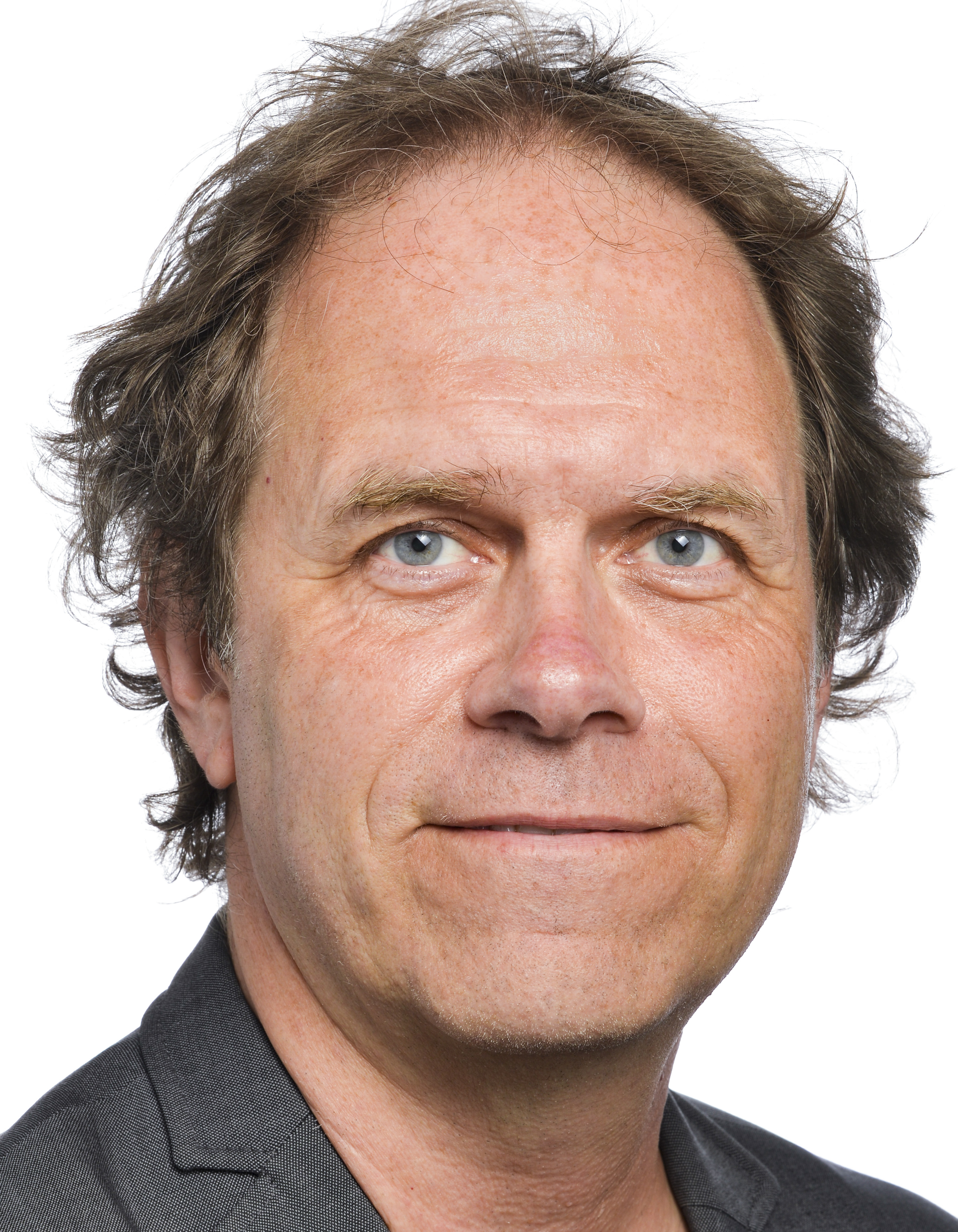

Member of the European Parliament
- Incumbent
- Assumed office 2 July 2019
- Constituency: Sweden

Personal details
- Born: Pär Anders Holmgren; 24 October 1964 (age 61) Gävle, Sweden
- Party: Sweden; Green Party; European Union; Greens-European Free Alliance

Pär Anders Holmgren (born 24 October 1964) is a Swedish meteorologist and politician who has been a Member of the European Parliament (MEP) since 2019. He is a member of the Green Party, part of Greens-European Free Alliance.

== Career as meteorologist ==
Holmgren was a meteorologist by profession, and between 1988 and 2008 presented the weather report for the Swedish public service company SVT He holds an honorary doctorate from Uppsala University, where he is a frequent lecturer, and has published several books on the subjects of meteorology and climate policy.

During his career he has also worked for the Swedish Air Force and the insurance company Länsförsäkringar.

== Political career ==
Holmgren took the step from academia to politics in the 2018, when he joined the Swedish Green party. In the 2019 European Parliament elections, he won one of two seats allocated to the Swedish Greens, together with Alice Bah Kuhnke. In parliament, he has since been serving on the Committee on the Environment, Public Health and Food Safety. In addition to his committee assignments, he is a member of the parliament's delegation to the EU-Russia Parliamentary Cooperation Committee.
