= Minor political parties in Sweden and their results in parliamentary elections =

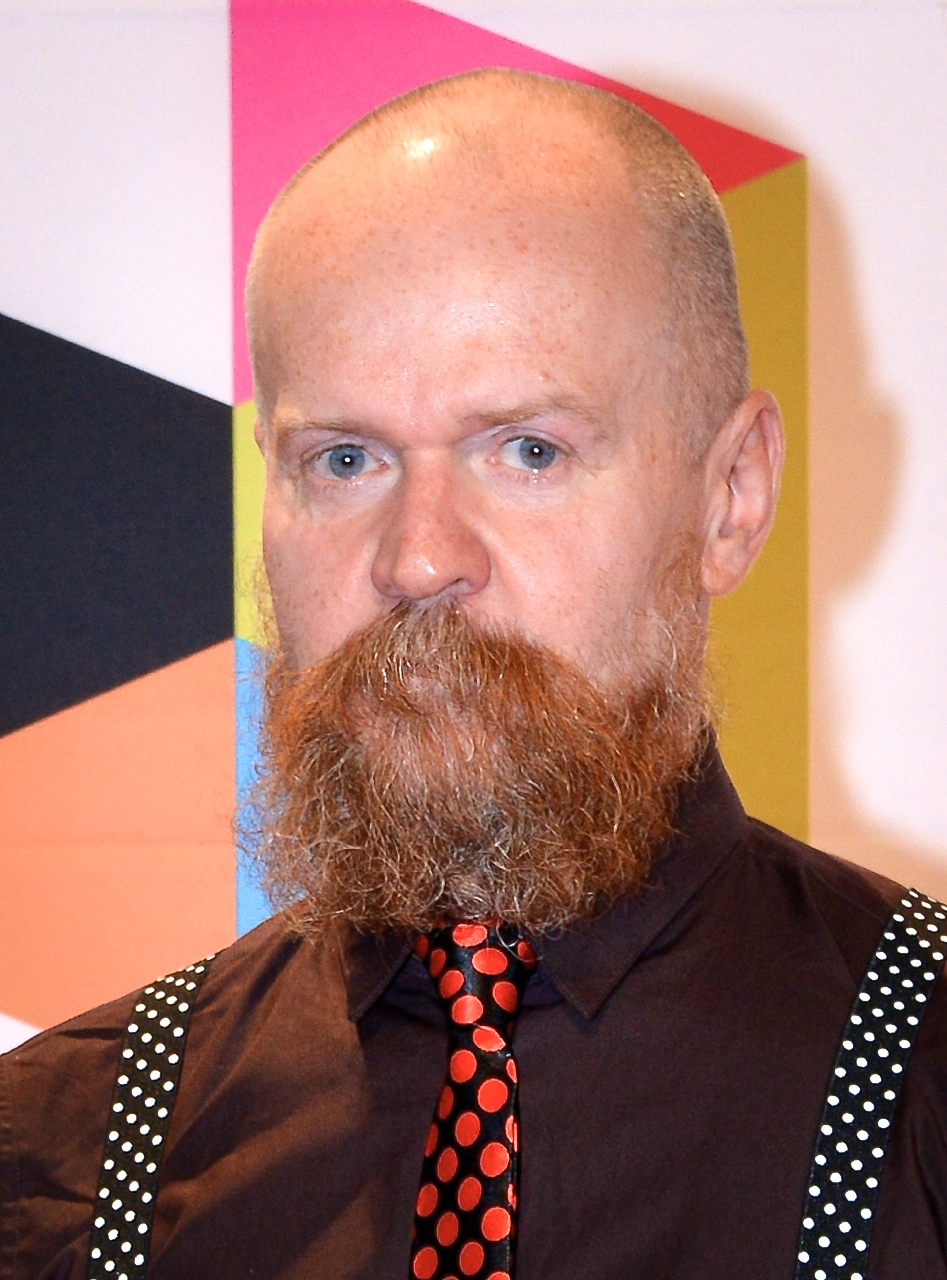
Alexander Bard, a Swedish musician and writer who has been involved in several small political parties. He is currently involved with Medborgerlig Samling (en: Citizens coalition), one of several new minor political parties in Sweden.

The electoral threshold to the parliament in Sweden, Riksdagen, is four percentage. Currently there are eight political parties in Riksdagen, but in every election there are also many political parties outside the parliament. The results for these smaller political parties in the Swedish general election since 1998 is listed below. The Sweden Democrats is included even though the party is in Riksdagen since 2010, because it was outside the parliament until that time. To the right Alexander Bard, a wellknown musician who has been involved with several minor political parties, from Piratpartiet (the Pirate Party) to Medborgerlig Samling (the Citizens coalition).

== Top results since 1998 ==
The top results in general elections for minor parties in Sweden from 1998 and forward are as follows:

- Feministiskt Initiativ, 3.12 percentage (2014)
- Sverigedemokraterna, 2.93 percentage (2006)
- SPI Välfärden, 1.00 percentage (1998)
- Piratpartiet, 0.65 percentage (2010)
- Det nya partiet, 0.48 percentage (1998)
- Junilistan, 0.47 percentage (2006)
- Partiet Nyans, 0.44 percentage (2022)

== General election from 1998 to 2022 ==
Parti	1998	2002	Valet 2006	2010	2014	2018	2022
Allianspartiet	175	58	133	87			
Alternativ för Sverige						20,290 (0,31 %)	16,646 (0,26 %)
Basinkomstpartiet (en: The Basic income party)						632	374
Centrumdemokraterna	377						
Det fria folkets röst		207					
Det nya partiet	25,276 (0,48 %)						
Direktdemokraterna (Note: Direktdemokraterna was formed some time before the general election of 2014. Before that it was called Aktiv Demokrati.)			81	76	1,417	5,153	1,755
Djurens parti (en: Party of the animals)					4,093	3,648	
Enhet	1,725	603	2,648	632	6,277	4,647	1,234
Europeiska arbetarpartiet	117	163	83	187	140	52	15
Feministiskt initiativ			37,954 (0,68 %)	24,139 (0,40 %)	194,719 (3,12 %)	29,665 (0,46 %)	3,157
Folkdemokraterna	109	12					
Folkets vilja			881	2			
Framstegspartiet					196		
Fria listan		274					
Frihetspartiet	8			688			
Förenade Demokratiska Partiet							157
Gottlandspartiet Gotlands framtid	405						
Hälsopartiet					131		
Initiativet						615	
Invandrarpartiet	133						2
Junilistan			26,072 (0,47 %)	41	8		
Klassiskt liberala partiet			202	716	1,210	1,504	344
Klimatalliansen							1,702
Knapptryckarna							5,493
Kristna Värdepartiet					3,553	3,202	5,983
Kvinnokraft			116				
Landsbygdspartiet oberoende				1,565	3,450	4,962	2,215
Medborgerlig samling						13,056	12,882 (0,20%)
MoD - Mänskliga rättigheter och Demokrati							6,077
Nationaldemokraterna		4,122	3,064	1,141			
Nordiska motståndsrörelsen						2,106	847
Norrbottenspartiet		14,854 (0,28 %)					
Norrländska samlingspartiet (Note: The party was dissolved in 2013.)				1,456			
Ny demokrati (Note: Partiet upplöstes 2000 men har alltså fortsatt att få handskrivna röster.)	8,297	106	61				3
Ny Framtid	9,171	9,337	1,171	4	5		
Partiet de fria					749		
Partiet för naturens lag	791						
Partiet Nyans							28,352 (0,44 %)
Partiet Vändpunkt							419
Pensionärspartiet	6,865		7	57	11		
Piratpartiet			34,918 (0,63 %)	38,491 (0,65 %)	26,515 (0,43 %)	7,326	9,135 (0,14%)
Rättvisepartiet Socialisterna	3,044	1,519	1,097	1,507	791		
Sjukvårdspartiet			11,519	185	10		
Skånepartiet	28	4,564	11	17	28	296	206 (0,0032%)
Socialisterna-Välfärdspartiet							892
Socialistiska Partiet	1,466	3,213	21	7	5		
SPI Välfärden (Note: Until 2013 under the party name Sveriges pensionärers intresseparti.)	52,869 (1,00 %)	37,573 (0,71 %)	28,806 (0,52 %)	11,078	3,369		
Spritpartiet				237	4		
Stram kurs Sverige							156 (0,0024%)
Svenskarnas parti (Note: T.o.m. 2008 under namnet Nationalsocialistisk front.)			1,417	681	4,189		
Sverigedemokraterna (Note: Since 2010 in Riksdagen.)	19,624 (0,37 %)	76,300 (1,44 %)	162,463 (2,93 %)				
Sveriges kommunistiska parti (Note: Until 2006 the party used the name "Kommunisterna" (en: the communists).)	1,868	1,182	438	375	558	702	1,181
Sverigesmultidemokrater					388		
Sverige ut ur EU/Frihetliga Rättvisepartiet (FRP)							174
Trygghetspartiet						511	66
Unika partiet			222				
Vägvalet				7	1,037		
