= Dick Erixon =

Swedish writer and blogger

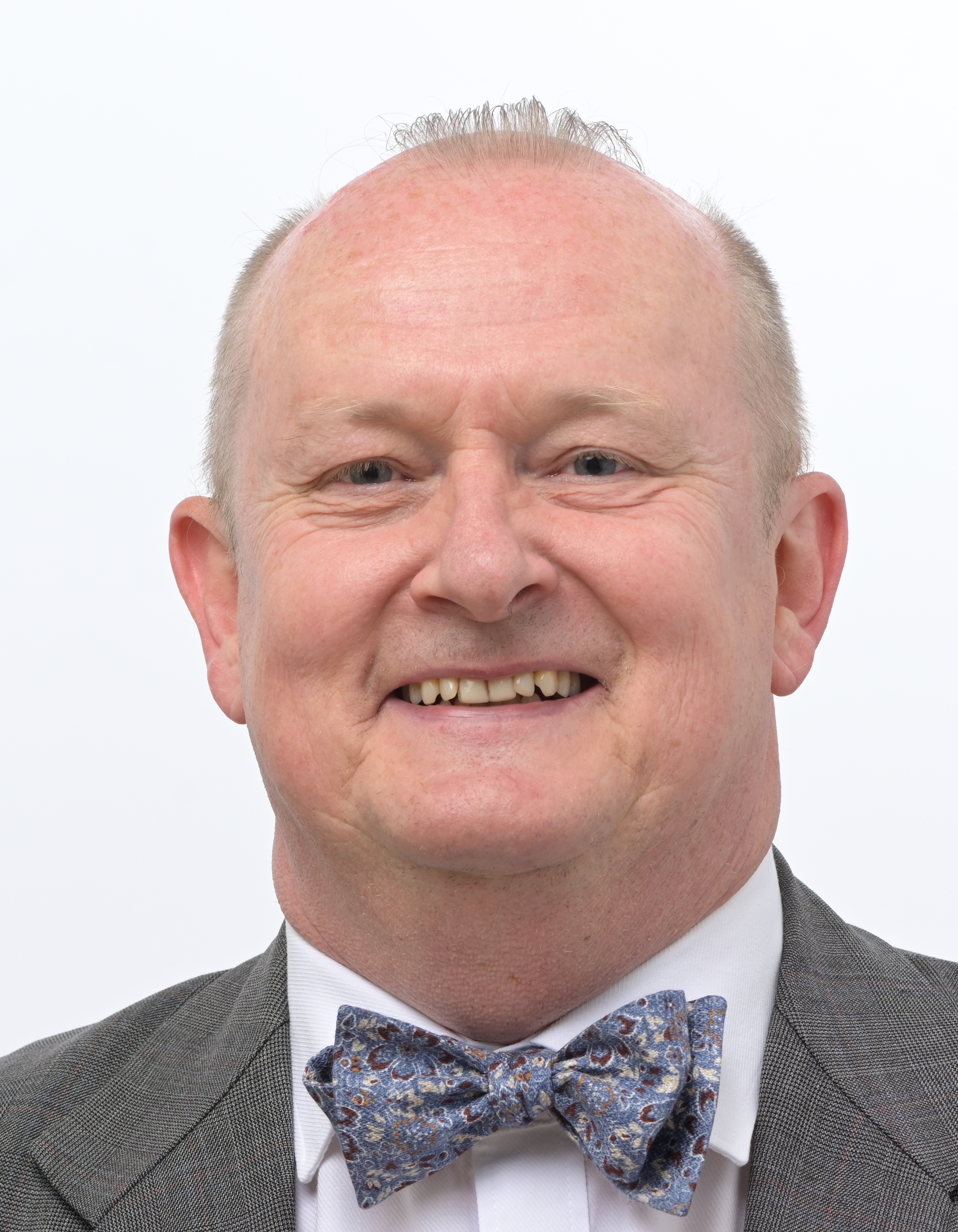

Member of the European Parliament
- Incumbent
- Assumed office 16 July 2024
- Constituency: Sweden

Personal details
- Born: Dick Harry Erixon; 16 July 1962 (age 63); Stockholm, Sweden
- Political party: Centre Party (1979–1999); Sweden Democrats (2016– )
- Occupation: Economist; Journalist

Dick Harry Erixon (born 16 July 1962) is a Swedish politician, economist and journalist. He is a Member of European Parliament for Sweden since July 2024, having been elected in the 2024 European election.

Erixon worked at the Swedish liberal think-tank Timbro from 1995 to 1997, and at the Swedish Enterprise Media Institute from 1994 to 1995. He was also an editorial writer for Finanstidningen from 1999 to 2002.

Erixon has also been active as a politician with the Swedish Centre Party, where he was a leading critic of former party leader Olof Johansson. Erixon expressed strong objections towards Johansson's close co-operation with the Social Democrats during the period 1995–98, which he argued outright prohibited the emergence of a serious centre-right alternative to the Social Democratic administration at the time. While Erixon is no longer a member of the Centre Party, he did support and vote for candidates of the party both in the 2006– and 2010 general elections. During the 2002 election he had however toured with the libertarian Free List party (Fria Listan), which gained little support and was eventually dissolved.

Politically, he rejects any labels other than non-socialist, but says that "libertarian-communitarian" comes closest to his views. While an atheist, Erixon has expressed enormous respect for Christian ethics and praised the cultural significance of Christianity in shaping Western civilization. On his blog, Erixon has made himself known as a supporter of the 2003 invasion of Iraq, the Bush Doctrine with its call for universal freedom to all and of the U.S. war on terror in general. He endorsed John McCain's candidacy in the 2008 United States Presidential Election, and has since shown strong support for the Tea Party movement.

Since at least 2018, Erixon has renounced his once strong belief in interventionism, describing it as "an idealistic dream without contact with reality" which "only led the West to sacrifice soldiers in vain", and that the Iraq War in particular had a goal "which was impossible to achieve".

In November 2020, Erixon together with Samtid & Framtid founded Riks.
