= Folklistan =

The People's List Folklistan
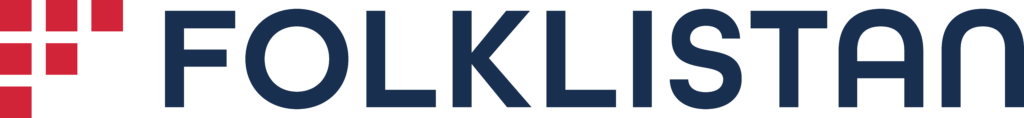
- Founder: Jan Emanuel; Sara Skyttedal
- Founded: 8 April 2024
- Dissolved: 27 June 2024
- Ideology: Populism; Anti-establishment; Soft Euroscepticism
- Political position: Big tent
- European affiliation: N/A
- European Parliament group: European People's Party Group (Sara Skyttedal - formerly)
- Slogan: Sätt gränser för EU ('Set limits for the EU')

Website
- folklistan.se

Folklistan (lit. 'The People's List') was a Swedish electoral alliance between individual candidates running in the 2024 European Parliament elections. Folklistan was launched by Jan Emanuel, a former Social Democratic Party MP, and Sara Skyttedal, an MEP previously with the Christian Democrats in April 2024. They are also the group's main candidates for the European Parliament elections 2024.

Sara Skyttedal was elected Member of the European Parliament in 2019 for the Christian Democrats, who are grouped with the European People's Party. She left the party in February 2024, but remained in parliament as an independent. In early April 2024, it was noticed that she had registered a new party called Folklistan, and it was later launched in Henrik Jönsson's program on YouTube. On June 27, Jan Emanuel announced that the party would be dissolved due to the poor result in the 2024 European Parliament elections.

== History and background ==
Jan Emanuel has long stated that his relationship with the Social Democrats had become cold. He revealed in 2021 that he no longer votes for them as according to him the party has abandoned classical social democracy and the workers, and that "they're no longer the party that I joined". He also stated that he is in internal opposition within the party and that he is a "conservative leftist" and does not have a party which represents him.

As of April 2024, four municipal politicians have left their parties to join Folklistan, with one Christian Democrat in Åtvidaberg, and three Swedish Democrats in Alingsås announcing their intent to join Folklistan.

== Election results ==
=== European Parliament ===
Election	List leader	Votes	%	Seats	+/–	EP Group
2024	Jan Emanuel	25,901	0.62 (#9)	0 / 21	New	–

== Priorities ==
Folklistan have set "Top 10 Priorities", with the ten priorities being:

1. Scrap the right of asylum
  The current asylum system is broken, built on an outdated 1951 refugee convention. The People's List wants to scrap the right to asylum, limit human smuggling and offer protection closer to conflict areas.
2. Send criminals to jail abroad
  The People's List proposes a new EU directive to allow member states to place criminals in other EU countries' prisons, reducing costs and increasing the efficient use of resources.
3. Improving European animal welfare
  We want to ban the import of meat from countries that cheat on animal welfare. The People's List wants to see stricter rules and better conditions for animals, as well as support farm-side slaughter to reduce long transports.
4. Save the Swedish model from the EU
  Sweden risks losing control over its welfare and labour market through EU legislation that affects wage formation, despite the fact that this is a national competence. Sweden should demand formal exemptions from the EU's centralising labour market policy in order to protect the Swedish party model.
5. Saving fish stocks in the Baltic Sea
  Fish stocks in the Baltic Sea are critically low and we are risking the availability of fish for future generations. The People's List proposes banning monster trawlers, reducing industrial fishing quotas and simplifying cormorant hunting to protect marine biodiversity and promote sustainable coastal fishing.
6. Tear up anti-rural legislation
  The People's List demands that parts of the EU's "Fit for 55" climate package be torn up to avoid over-regulation. We advocate expanding emissions trading instead of introducing bans and detailed regulations, especially in agriculture and forestry, for a more cost-effective and flexible reduction in emissions.
7. Release snus throughout the EU
  Adopt Sweden's successful model to dramatically reduce smoking in Europe. With the EU's lowest smoking rate thanks to available and tax-advantaged alternative nicotine products, Sweden has shown that it is possible to save lives and strengthen the economy. The EU must prioritise health by recognising and promoting safer nicotine alternatives.
8. Build a Fortress EU
  The People's List wants to strengthen the EU's defense by building security barriers against Russia and Belarus, increasing the European Defense Fund's budget, and coordinating defense purchases. We also propose increased support for ammunition production and adaptations of infrastructure for better defense mobility.
9. Start a European FBI
  Freedom of movement within the European Union is a great benefit, but it is exploited by criminals and terrorists who threaten our security. A European FBI is necessary to deal with these cross-border criminal networks. Europol must be given greatly increased powers and resources to combat these threats effectively and protect our citizens.
10. Stop waste – slim down the EU budget
  The EU budget costs Sweden SEK 45 billion annually. Much more than we get back. Despite promises from other parties to tighten the EU budget, the waste continues. The Corona Fund, which has also been adopted in addition to the regular budget, is ineffective and the funds have turned out to be pure stupidity. The People's List thinks we should get more for the money we spend on the EU.
