= Sara Skyttedal =

Swedish politician

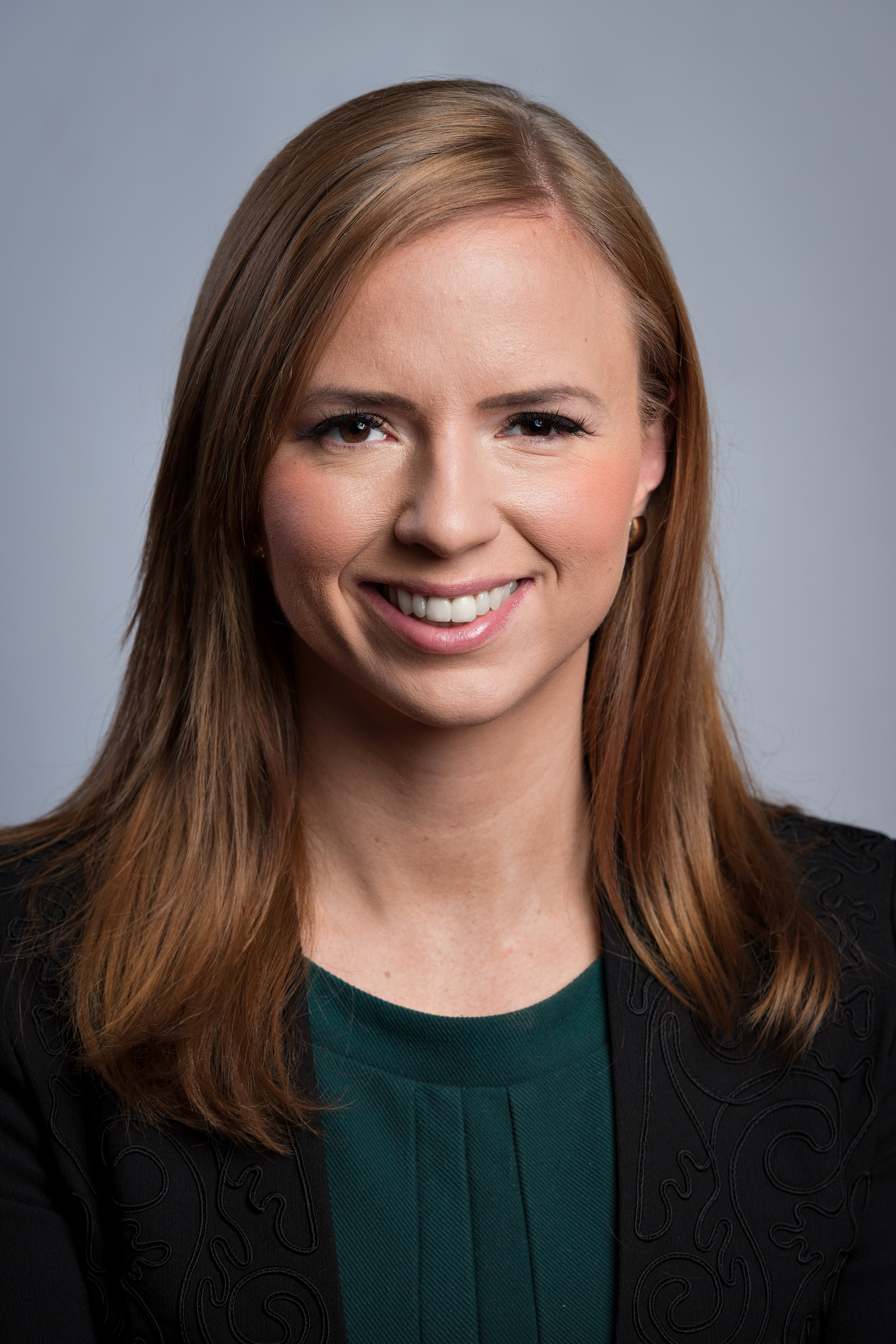
- Skyttedal in November 2016

Member of the European Parliament
- In office 2 July 2019 – 16 July 2024
- Constituency: Sweden

Personal details
- Born: Sara Magdalena Skyttedal; 6 August 1986 (age 40) Tyresö, Sweden
- Party: Folklistan (2024)
- Other political affiliations: Christian Democrats (2002–2024); Independent (2024)
- Spouse: Jimmy Dihang (m. 2023)
- Children: 2
- Education: Stockholm University; Södertörn University

Sara Magdalena Skyttedal Dihang (née Skyttedal; born 6 August 1986) is a Swedish politician previously of the Christian Democrats party. She was Member of the European Parliament from 2019 to 2024.

Between 2013 and 2016, she chaired the Young Christian Democrats. From 2016 to 2019, she was a municipal commissioner for Linköping.

== Early life and education ==
Skyttedal studied political science, political economy and history science at Stockholm University. She has also studied rhetoric, Swedish language and law. Skyttedal participated in the beauty pageant Miss Sweden in 2006, where she made the Top 15 in the final. It was her fiancé who had sent in an application for her to compete.

== Political career ==
=== Career in national politics ===
==== Christian Democrats ====
In September 2002, Skyttedal became a member of the Young Christian Democrats. Since then, she was chairperson of the Haninge constituance for the party, and district group ombudsman in the municipality of Stockholm. She was also district director for the Christian Democrats for Stockholm and vice chairperson for the party in Haninge.

Skyttedal has a background in municipality politics for Haninge; until 2010 she was first vice chairperson on the adult education and high school board, as well as juryman in Södertörn's court.

At the 2010 general elections in Sweden, she was a replacement at the Haninge City council, a job she was released from in early 2011 when she moved from the municipality. At the 2009 and 2014 elections for the European parliament, Skyttedal was a candidate for her party. At the 2010 general elections she became candidate for the municipality elections in Stockholm. She has also resided in Växjö and was part of the 2014 general election for the Kronoberg constituency.

Skyttedal was the chairperson of Young Christian Democrats since 11 May 2013 and a member of the Christian Democrats party executive board. She was previously first vice chairperson for the Young Christian Democrats. From May 2011 to May 2015, she was the vice chairperson for the Youth of the European People's Party (YEPP).

In October 2015, Skyttedal became the pivotal factor in the Christian Democrats' decision to pull out of the controversial December Agreement.

In July 2016, Skyttedal announced that she would resign as chairperson for the Young Christian Democrats at the next meeting, to be held in late 2016. On 8 September 2016, she announced that she had gained the office of municipal commissioner in Linköping. In the campaign for the September 2018 election for Linköping city hall, she made her party stand out as the most eager to lower municipal tax, and gained 7.5% of the votes, which – compared to 4.8% in the 2014 election – was the largest increase of any party.

In December 2022, Skyttedal wrote a debate article in which she advocates decriminalization of drug use and legalization of cannabis. She later said that she herself had used cannabis on "a handful of occasions" in countries where it was legal. These statements were controversial within the Christian Democrats and led to criticism from party leader Ebba Busch.

Skyttedal was excluded from the Christian Democrats on 19 January 2024 after having offered to be a candidate for the Sweden Democrats party in the 2024 European Parliament election. She was replaced by Alice Teodorescu Måwe. Skyttedal ultimately left the Christian Democrats on 15 February.

==== Founding of Folklistan (The People's List) ====
On 8 April 2024, Skyttedal and former Social Democratic politician and healthcare entrepreneur Jan Emanuel, founded Folklistan (The People's List), with the intention of running candidates for the upcoming 2024 European Parliament elections.

=== Member of the European Parliament, 2019–2024 ===
In 2018, Skyttedal was elected as the Christian Democrats’ leading candidate for the 2019 European elections. Since becoming a Member of the European Parliament, she has been serving on the Committee on Industry, Research and Energy. In this capacity, she has been leading the committee's work on reforming the European Union Emissions Trading System since 2021.

In addition to her committee assignments, Skyttedal has been part of the Parliament's delegation to the Conference on the Future of Europe since 2021.

=== Municipal commissioner ===
Skyttedal received harsh criticism on Twitter after using the word "Quisling" about Annie Lööf, with users pointing out that she was comparing Lööf to a Nazi. Party leader Ebba Busch Thor distanced herself from the remark, telling Nyheter24 that it was "not a word I would have chosen myself" and "an inappropriate choice of words." In January 2018, Skyttedal wrote on Twitter that there were so many "dumpuckon" boycotting air travel that the conditions for airlines to invest in new green technology were worsening, and that she therefore flew a few extra times as her own form of climate compensation.

== Personal life ==
Skyttedal is a practising Catholic.

In May 2024 Skyttedal revealed that she has tried psychedelic mushrooms where it was legal, but did not experience any significant effects. Skyttedal believes in the potential health benefits of psychedelic mushrooms but maintains that they should not be freely available for recreational use.

== See also ==
- List of cannabis rights leaders
