= David Lega =

Swedish Paralympian and politician

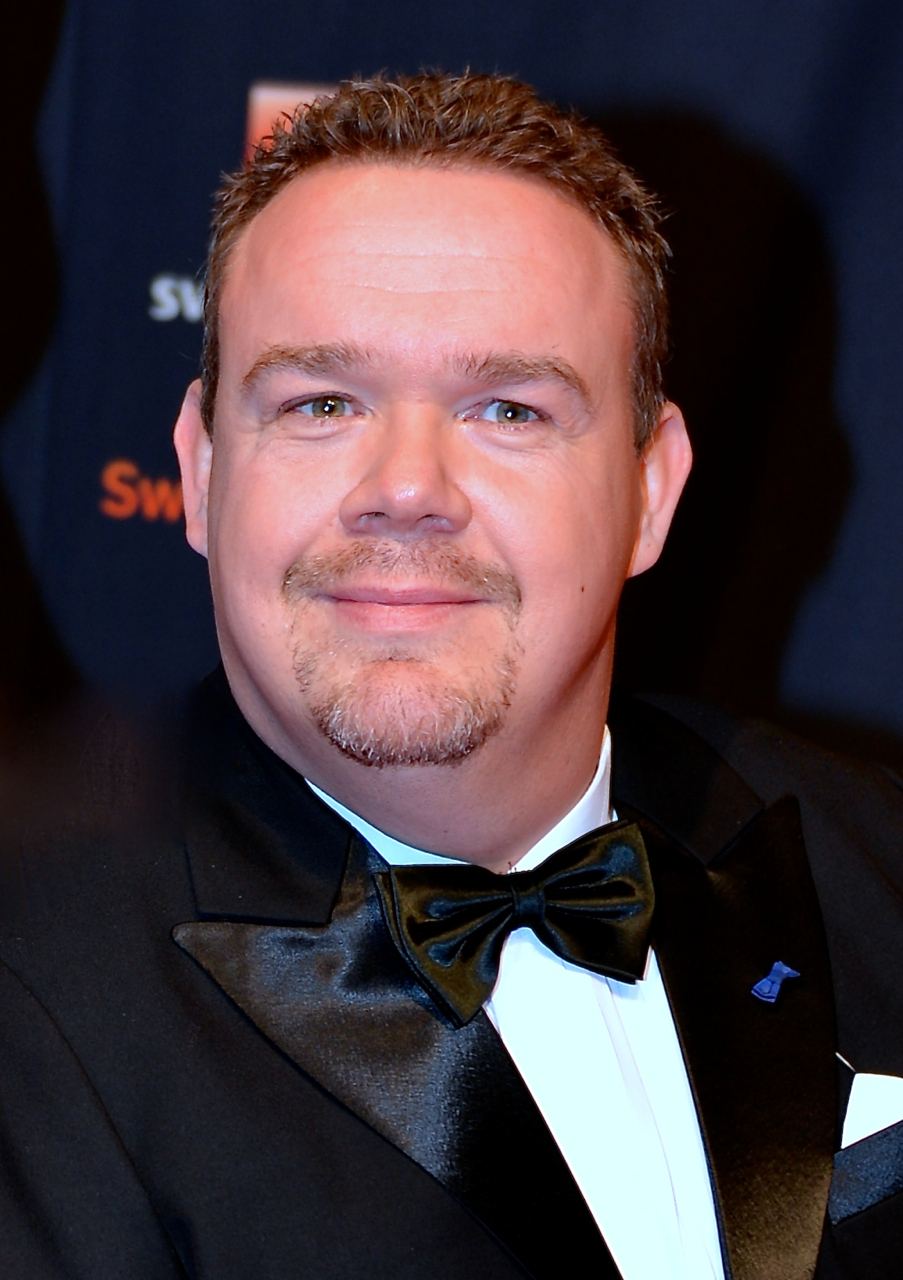
- David Lega in January 2014

Member of the European Parliament
- In office 2 July 2019 – 16 July 2024
- Constituency: Sweden

Personal details
- Born: 12 October 1973 (age 51); Gothenburg, Sweden
- Occupation: Deputy Mayor of Gothenburg
- Known for: Paralympic swimming, public speaking

Michael David Alexander Lega (born 12 October 1973) is a Swedish politician for the Christian Democrats, and a former paralympic swimmer who beat 14 world records during his career. He was a Member of the European Parliament from 2019 to 2024, and served on the committee on foreign affairs and the committee of human rights.

== Early life and career ==
Lega was born with the congenital disease arthrogryposis. He became a paralympic swimmer, competing in the Paralympic Games in Atlanta in 1996 and Sydney in 2000, and the IPC Swimming World Championships in 1994 and 1998. He won three gold medals in the 1998 IPC Championships.

Lega retired as a swimmer after the 2000 Paralympic Games and became a public speaker and entrepreneur. He owns companies within personal development, computer technology, and a fashion brand called Lega Wear. He released the book HANDS FREE - David Lega's Inspiring Journey in 2008. In 2005, he was named one of the JCI Ten Outstanding Young Persons of the World.

He has been on the executive boards of the Swedish Sports Confederation and UNICEF Sweden. He won the Whang Youn Dai Achievement Award in 1996.

== Political career ==
In January 2011, Lega was elected chairman of the executive committee of Gothenburg. In January 2012 he became the second vice chairman of the executive board for the Christian Democratic Party in Sweden.

Lega has been a Member of the European Parliament since the 2019 elections, serving on the Committee on Foreign Affairs and its Subcommittee on Human Rights. In addition to his committee assignments, he is part of the European Parliament Intergroup on Disability.

In late 2023, Lega announced that he would not stand in the 2024 European Parliament election.

== Sources ==
- https://web.archive.org/web/20081007090024/http://www.davidlega.com/
- http://www.jci.cc/news/en/5491/Sweden's-David-Lega-Selected-as-a-TOYP-Honoree
- http://www.legawear.com
