= Erik Bergkvist =

Swedish politician (1965–2024)

Erik Bergkvist MEP
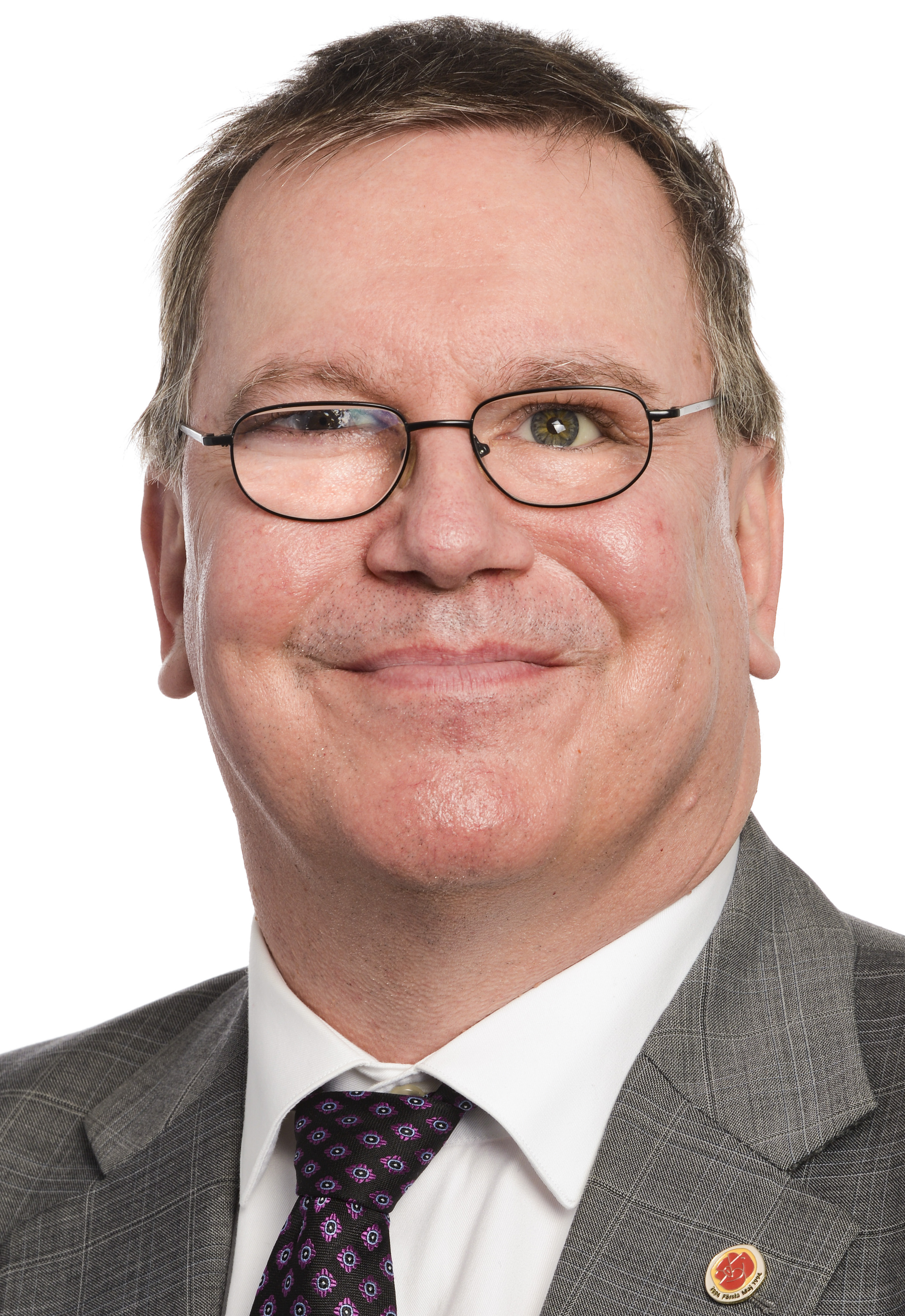

Member of the European Parliament for Sweden
- In office 2019 – 20 February 2024

Personal details
- Born: 1 May 1965
- Died: 20 February 2024 (aged 58)

Erik Rickard Bergkvist (1 May 1965 – 20 February 2024) was a Swedish politician for the Social Democratic Party. In 2019, he was voted into the European Parliament.

Bergkvist died after suffering from lung cancer on 20 February 2024, at the age of 58.

He was replaced in the European Parliament by Linus Glanzelius.
