= National minorities in Sweden =

Officially recognized national minorities in Sweden are Jews, Roma, Sámi, Swedish Finns and Tornedalians. The recognition is made in accordance with Sweden's commitments under the Council of Europe's Framework Convention for the Protection of National Minorities and the European Charter for Regional or Minority Languages. The Riksdag has also recognized Yiddish, Romani Chib, Sámi, Finnish and Meänkieli national minority languages in Sweden. The Sámi are also recognized as an indigenous people. It is the position of the Swedish government that the national minorities and minority languages have existed in the country for a long time, and the language and culture of the minorities are part of a common Swedish cultural heritage. Sweden has, however, not become a signatory to the Indigenous and Tribal Peoples Convention, 1989.

== National minority population statistics ==
The Riksdag has decided that in order to obtain the status of a recognized national minority, a minority population must be a group with a pronounced affinity, which can be distinguished from the rest of the population, have a religious, linguistic, traditional or cultural distinctiveness, which it does not share with others, have a pronounced desire to maintain its identity and have historical or long-standing ties with Sweden.

The recognized national minorities have through history actively protected its culture and language so that their cultures now are a living part of Swedish society and cultural heritage. All five national minorities have also been present in Sweden for a very long time. Jews have lived in the country since the 17th century and Roma since at least the 16th century. The Sámi, the Tornedalians and the Finnish speakers have been present in what today is Sweden since before the formation of the Swedish state.

National minority	Population size (2023)
Jews	20,000–25,000
Roma	50,000–100,000
Sámi	20,000–35,000
Swedish Finns	450,000–600,000
Tornedalians	50,000

== National minority rights ==
National minority rights are regulated in the Act of 2009 on National Minorities and Minority Languages as amended, and the 2009 Language Act. According to these acts, government agencies, regions and municipalities have a responsibility to advance the minority languages, disseminate information and ensure that those belonging to national minorities have the opportunity to participate and influence matters affecting them. Speakers of three of the languages – Finnish, Meänkieli and Sámi – also have special rights to communicate with governments authorities, regions and municipalities in their own language, and in specified sections of the country or use the language in court.

The Swedish Institute for Language and Folklore is in charge of language preservation of the national minority languages, and provides grants to organizations with such aims. The institute is also responsible for the language centers for Finnish, Yiddish, Meänkieli and Romani Chib. The Sámi language center is under the Sámi Parliament of Sweden. The Swedish Arts Council provides special funding for the national minority culture projects. The National Library of Sweden supports book and library activities for the national minority languages. The charters for Sveriges Television, Sveriges Radio and the Swedish Educational Broadcasting Company contains provisions on minority languages.

In specific sections of the country, defined as the administrative areas for Finnish, Meänkieli or Sámi, children who belong to a national minority have the right to receive pre-school education entirely or to a significant extent in those languages. Several universities and colleges have a special mission to offer courses in the national minority languages. Senior citizens in these areas who speak Finnish, Meänkieli or Sami, have a right to receive elderly care entirely or to a significant extent in their language.

The Living History Forum, a Swedish government agency, is in charge of coordinating projects combating prejudices about Sami, Roma and Jews.

== Minority policy agencies ==
Two government agencies are in charge of a general overview of Sweden's minority policy; the County Administrative Board of Stockholm County and the Sámi Parliament. Finnish, Meänkieli or and Sámi can always be used in written contacts with the Parliamentary Ombudsman, Equality Ombudsman. They can also be used in written contacts with the Chancellor of Justice, the Social Insurance Agency, the Tax Agency and the Employment Service.

Finnish or Meänkieli can be used in cases handled in a court that have jurisdiction over the municipalities of Gällivare, Haparanda, Kiruna, Pajala and Övertorneå, if the case is related to any of these municipalities. Sámi can be used in cases handled in a court that have jurisdiction over the municipalities of Arjeplog, Gällivare, Jokkmokk and Kiruna, if the case is related to any of these municipalities.

Sixty-six municipalities (among them the City of Stockholm) belongs to the Finnish administrative area, 25 municipalities to the Sámi and 9 municipalities to the administrative area of Meänkieli.
