= Jakop Dalunde =

Swedish politician

Jakop Dalunde MEP
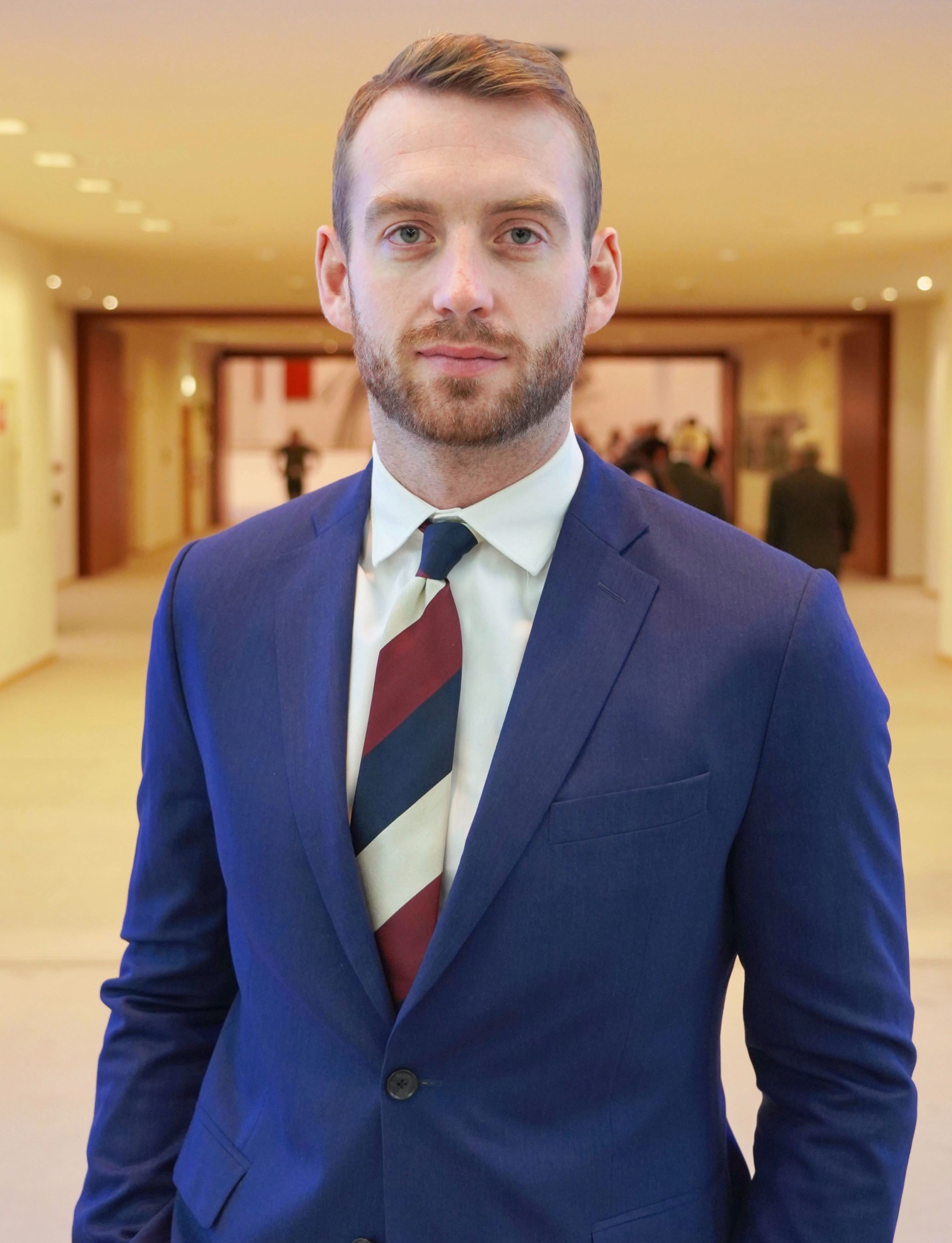
- Jakop Dalunde in 2018

Member of the European Parliament
- In office 1 February 2020 – 16 July 2024
- In office 7 June 2016 – 1 July 2019
- Constituency: Sweden

Personal details
- Born: 22 February 1984 (age 42) Stockholm, Sweden
- Party: Swedish; Green Party; EU; European Green Party
- Education: Stockholm University

Jakop Gideon Dalunde (born 2 February 1984) is a Swedish politician for the Green Party. Since 1 November 2025, he serves as Chair of SL (Stockholm Public Transport) and Traffic Commissioner in the Stockholm Region, where he also leads the Green Party group.

He previously served as a Member of the European Parliament (MEP) for Sweden from 2016 to 2019, and regained his seat after Brexit in February 2020, serving until July 2024. He is a member of the European Green Party.

== Political career ==
From 2014-2016 Dalunde served as a Member of the Swedish Parliament and defence policy spokesperson for the Green Party. From 2008–2011 he served as a spokesperson for the Young Greens of Sweden.

In the European Parliament, Dalunde served on the Committee on Industry, Research and Energy from 2016 until 2019. From 2020-2024 he was a member of the Committee on Transport and Tourism.

In addition to his committee assignments, Dalunde has been part of the Parliament’s delegations for Russia (2016-2017), Moldova (2016-2017) and India (since 2020). From 2017 until 2019, he was a member of the delegation to the Parliamentary Assembly of the Union for the Mediterranean.

On 18 October 2023, Dalunde announced that he would not seek reelection as a member of the European Parliament.
