= Mikail Yüksel =

Swedish politician

- Born: Kulu, Konya Province, Turkey
- Education: University of Gothenburg
- Occupation: Politician
- Known for: Founder and leader of the political party Partiet Nyans

Mikail Yüksel is a Swedish politician of Turkish origin, founder and leader of Partiet Nyans (“Party of Nuance”). He is widely acknowledged for his skill as a communicator and for mobilising voices in Swedish politics that previously had limited representation. According to commentary in the Swedish press, he has the ability to articulate complex issues of integration, discrimination and minority rights in a manner that resonates with voters.

== Early life and education ==
Yüksel was born in Kulu, Turkey, and immigrated to Sweden in 2001. He worked in a variety of jobs — including dishwasher, pizza maker, taxi driver, warehouse worker and IT technician — before entering university studies. His background gives him a perspective of both lived experience and academic training. He later studied political science and public administration at the University of Gothenburg.

== Political career ==
Yüksel entered formal politics via the Centre Party but was excluded in August 2018 amid allegations of links to the Turkish ultranationalist organisation Grey Wolves. In 2019 he founded the party Partiet Nyans and became its leader. The party presents itself primarily as an advocate for Muslims and other minority groups in Sweden, focusing on issues such as discrimination, social inclusion and the rights of families under Sweden’s child protection system.

== Advocacy and positions ==
Yüksel has garnered attention as an outspoken voice on Islamophobia and minority rights in Sweden. He and his party have called for stronger legal protections against hate crimes targeting Muslims and have intervened in public debates about acts they consider provocative, such as Quran burnings. Under his leadership, the party has also highlighted alleged misuse of Sweden’s child protection law (LVU) in cases affecting Muslim families.

== Controversies ==
Yüksel has been criticised for statements perceived as sympathetic to certain Turkish national‑political positions. In particular, his avoidance of the term “genocide” when discussing the Armenian genocide has been noted by Swedish media. During the 2023 Israel–Hamas conflict, Yüksel and his party drew attention for suggesting that Hamas be removed from the EU terrorist list — a stance that triggered substantial criticism from Swedish political commentators.

In September 2022, Sveriges Radio reported that Yüksel had been convicted by a Turkish court in 2009 of minor assault against a relative. The sentence was a conditional fine. Documents examined by Sveriges Radio and Expressen also indicated that he had been suspected of unlawful threat in connection with the same incident. Yüksel denied the allegations, acknowledging that a legal process had taken place but stating that he did not recall receiving a judgment and questioning the authenticity of the documents presented, which he said lacked stamps and signatures.

After the 2022 elections, Partiet Nyans experienced significant internal conflicts. Several members and co-founder Hassan Khan accused Yüksel of undemocratic and overly centralised leadership. An internal opposition group produced a report critical of his conduct and demanded his resignation. Multiple members left the party or were expelled. At an extraordinary congress held in December 2022, Yüksel was re-elected as party leader. The decision prompted protests and the departure of several participants, some of whom announced plans to form a new party.
