= Linus Glanzelius =

Swedish politician

Linus Glanzelius MEP
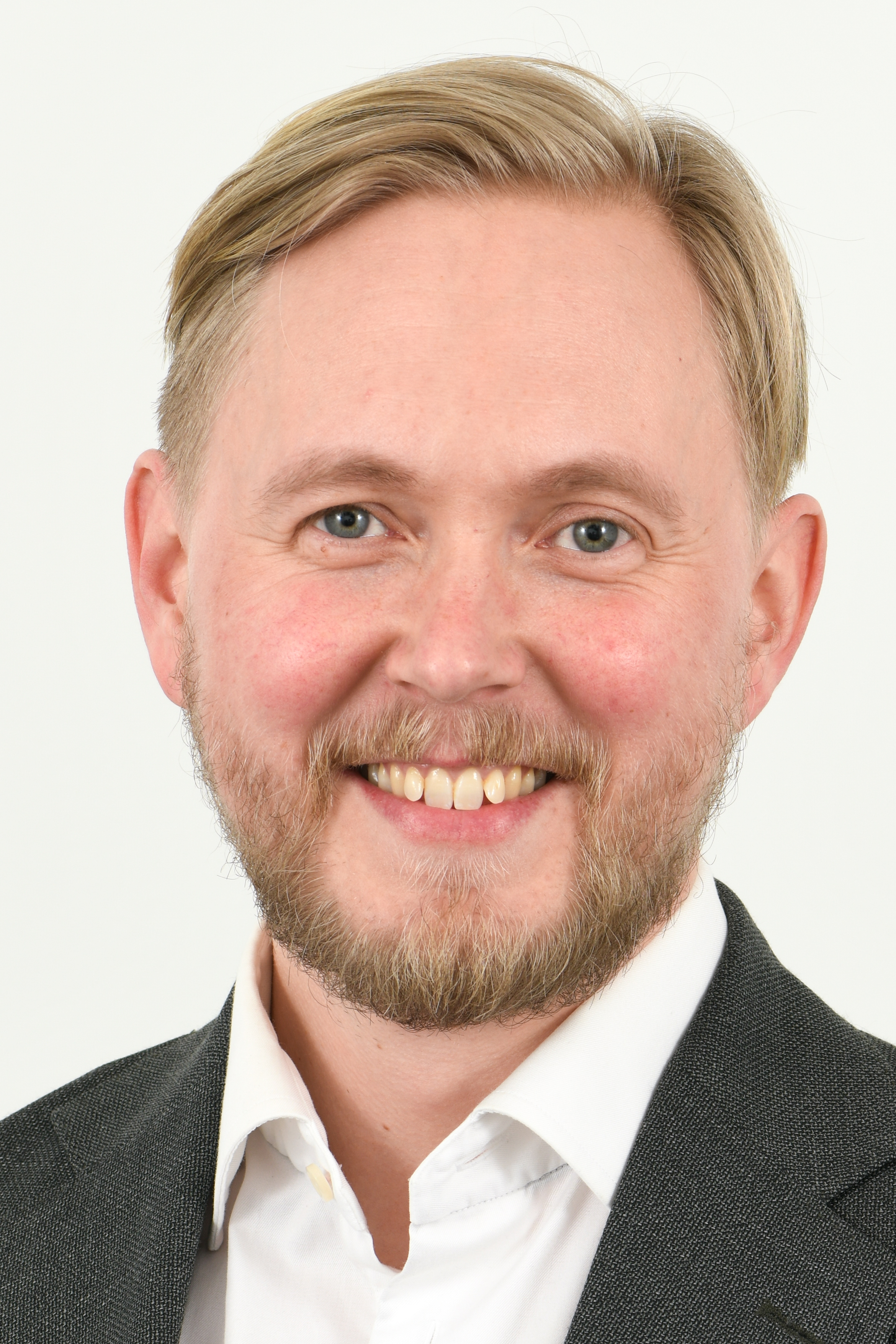

Member of the European Parliament for Sweden
- Incumbent
- Assumed office 27 February 2024

Personal details
- Born: 28 December 1990

Linus Glanzelius (born 28 December 1990) is a Swedish politician for the Social Democratic Party. On 27 February 2024, he became a member of the European Parliament for Sweden, replacing Erik Bergkvist who had died.
