= Sweden (European Parliament constituency) =

Constituency of the European Parliament

- European Parliament constituency
- Location among the current constituencies
- Member state: Sweden
- Created: 1995
- MEPs: 22 (1995–2004); 19 (2004–2009); 18 (2009–2011); 20 (2011–present)

Sweden is a European Parliament constituency for elections in the European Union covering the member state of Sweden. It is currently represented by twenty-one Members of the European Parliament.

== Elections ==
=== 1995 ===
The 1996 election was the first European election for Sweden as it acceded to the Union on 1 January 1995. The elections to elect the 22 Members of the European Parliament for Sweden were held on 17 September 1995.

=== 1999 ===
The 1999 European election was the fifth election to the European Parliament and the second for Sweden. The vote took place on 13 June 1999.

=== 2004 ===
The 2004 European election was the sixth election to the European Parliament and the third for Sweden. The vote took place on 13 June 2004. The ruling Social Democrats polled poorly, but virtually all the established parties lost ground to the eurosceptic June List.

=== 2009 ===
The 2009 European election was the seventh election to the European Parliament and the fourth for Sweden. The vote took place on 7 June 2009 The election was held using a modified form of the Sainte-Laguë method of party-list proportional representation using the entire country as a single electoral constituency.

=== 2014 ===
The 2014 European election was the eighth election to the European Parliament and the fifth for Sweden. The vote took place on 25 May 2014. At the election, twenty Members of the European Parliament (MEPs) were from the Swedish constituency.

=== 2019 ===
The 2019 European election was the ninth election to the European Parliament and the sixth for Sweden. The vote took place on 26 May 2019.

=== 2024 ===
The 2024 European election was the tenth election to the European Parliament and the seventh for Sweden.
