= 2014 European Parliament election in Sweden =

- 25 May 2014

All 20 Swedish seats to the European Parliament
- Turnout: 51.07% (▲5.54 pp)
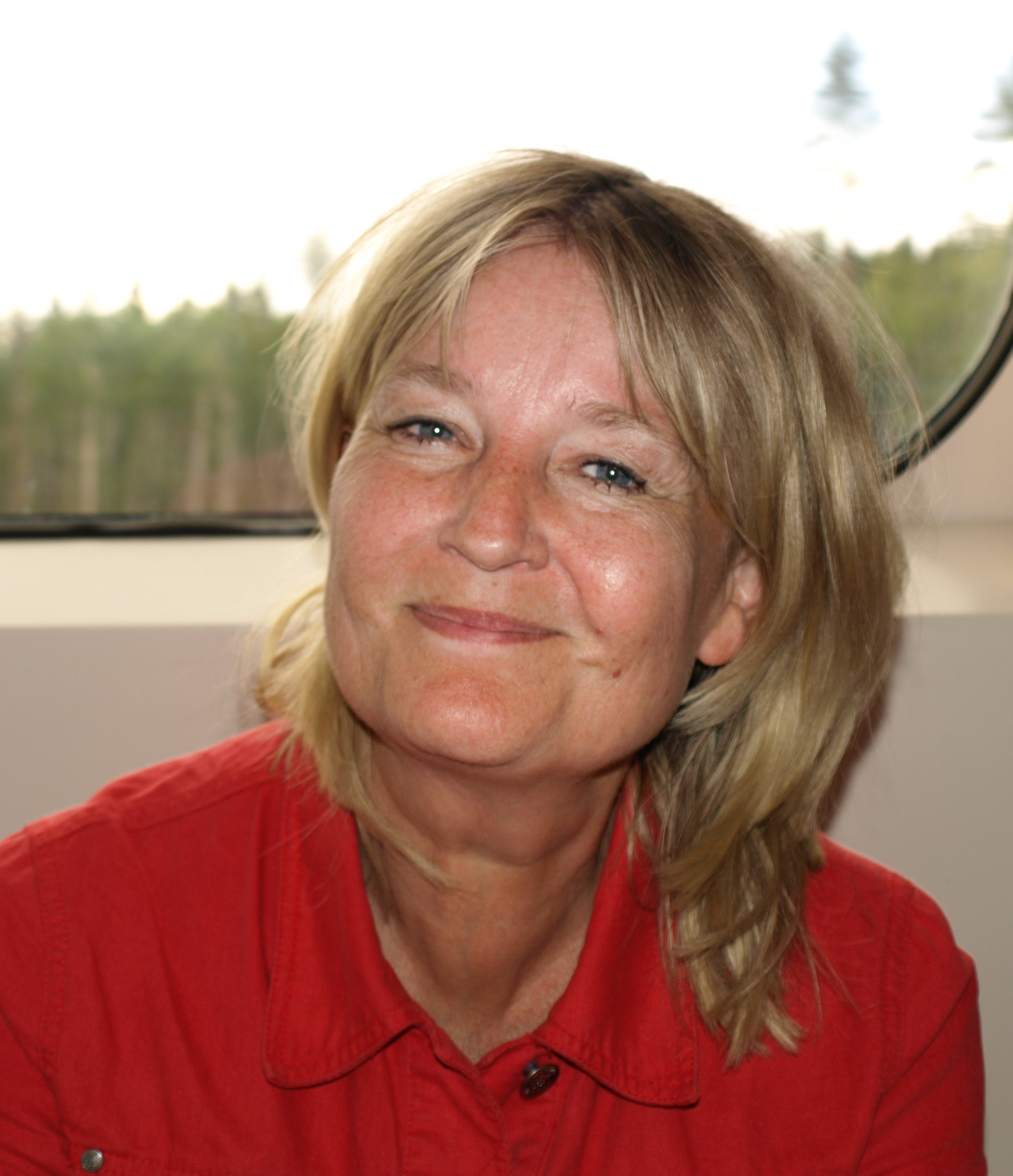

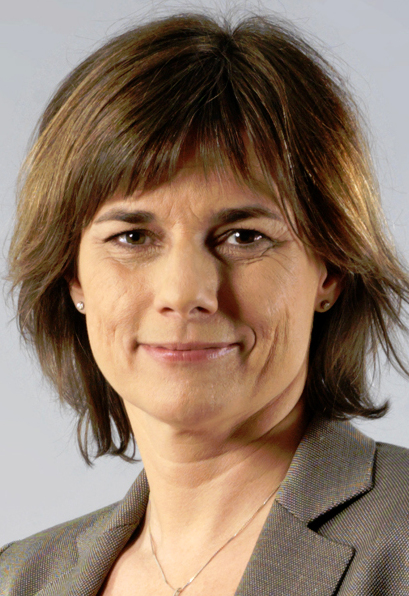

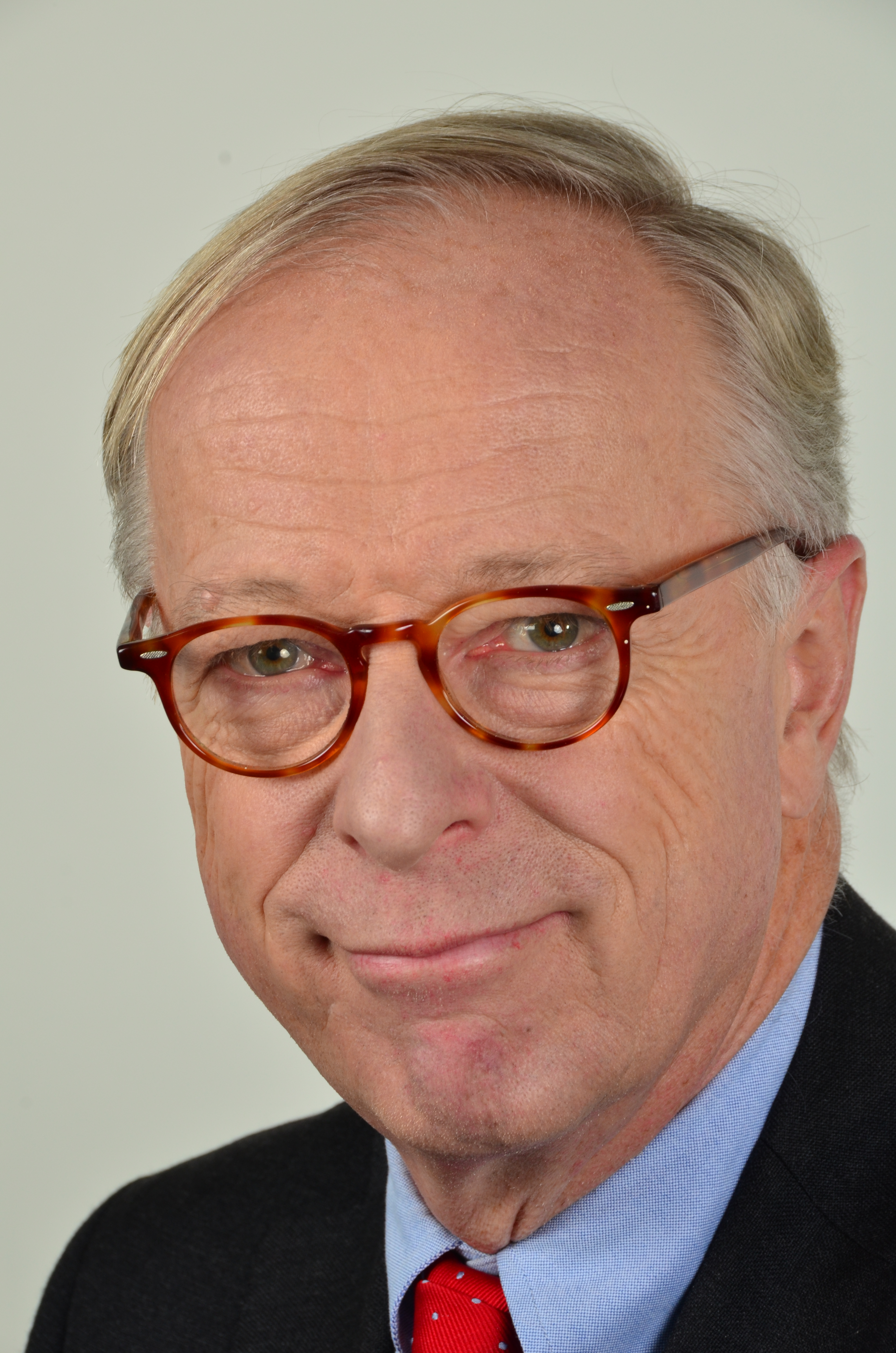

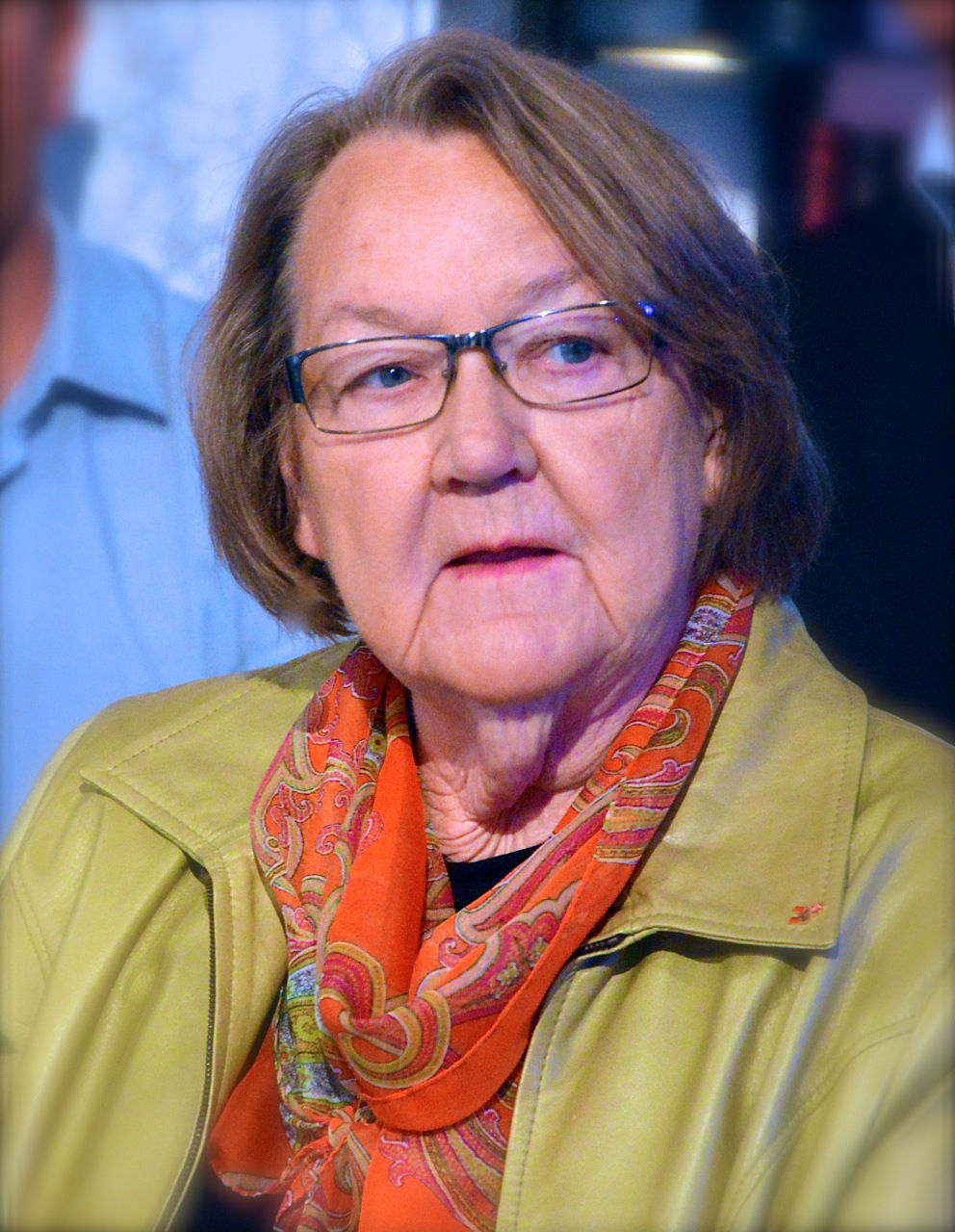

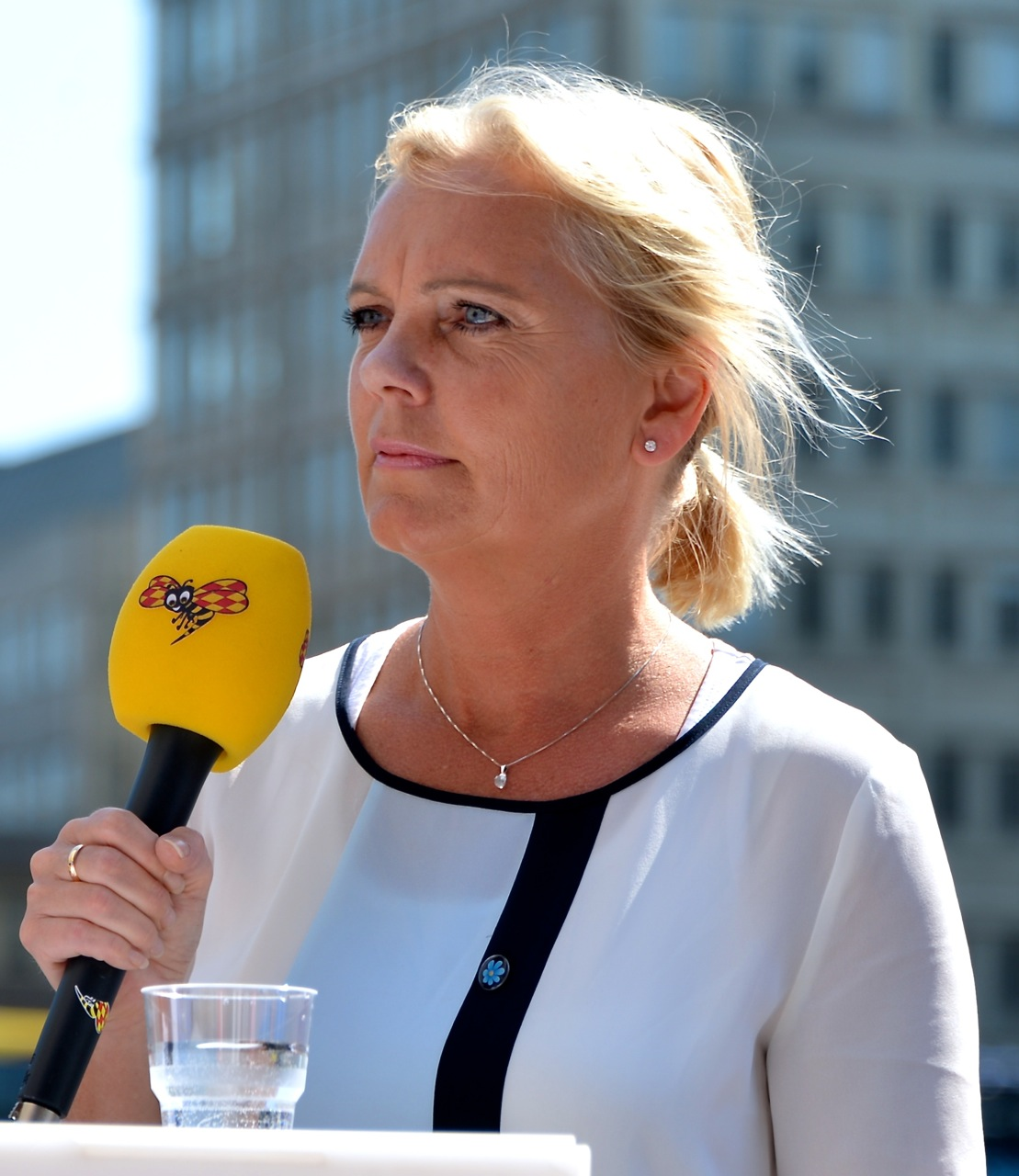

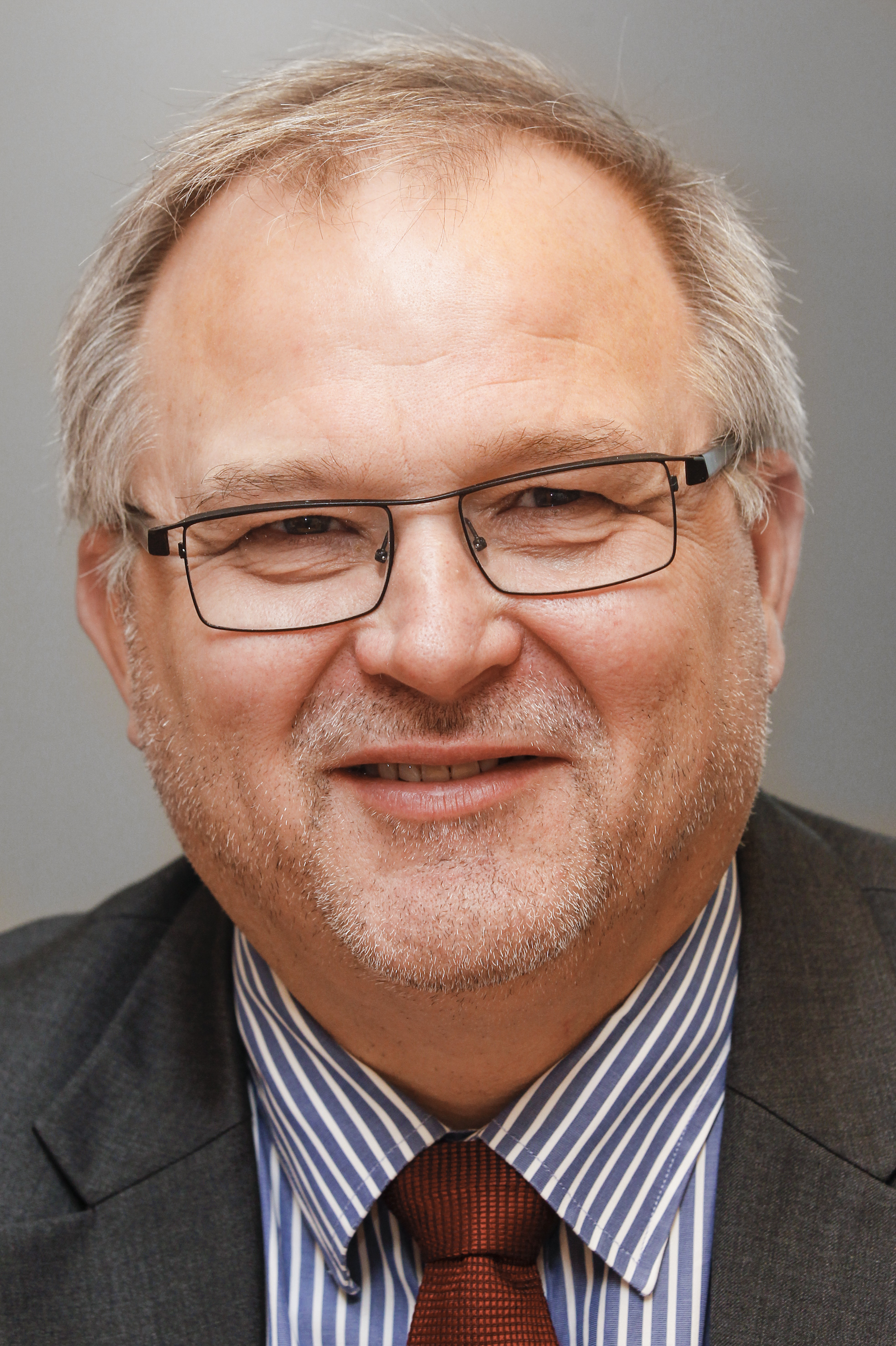

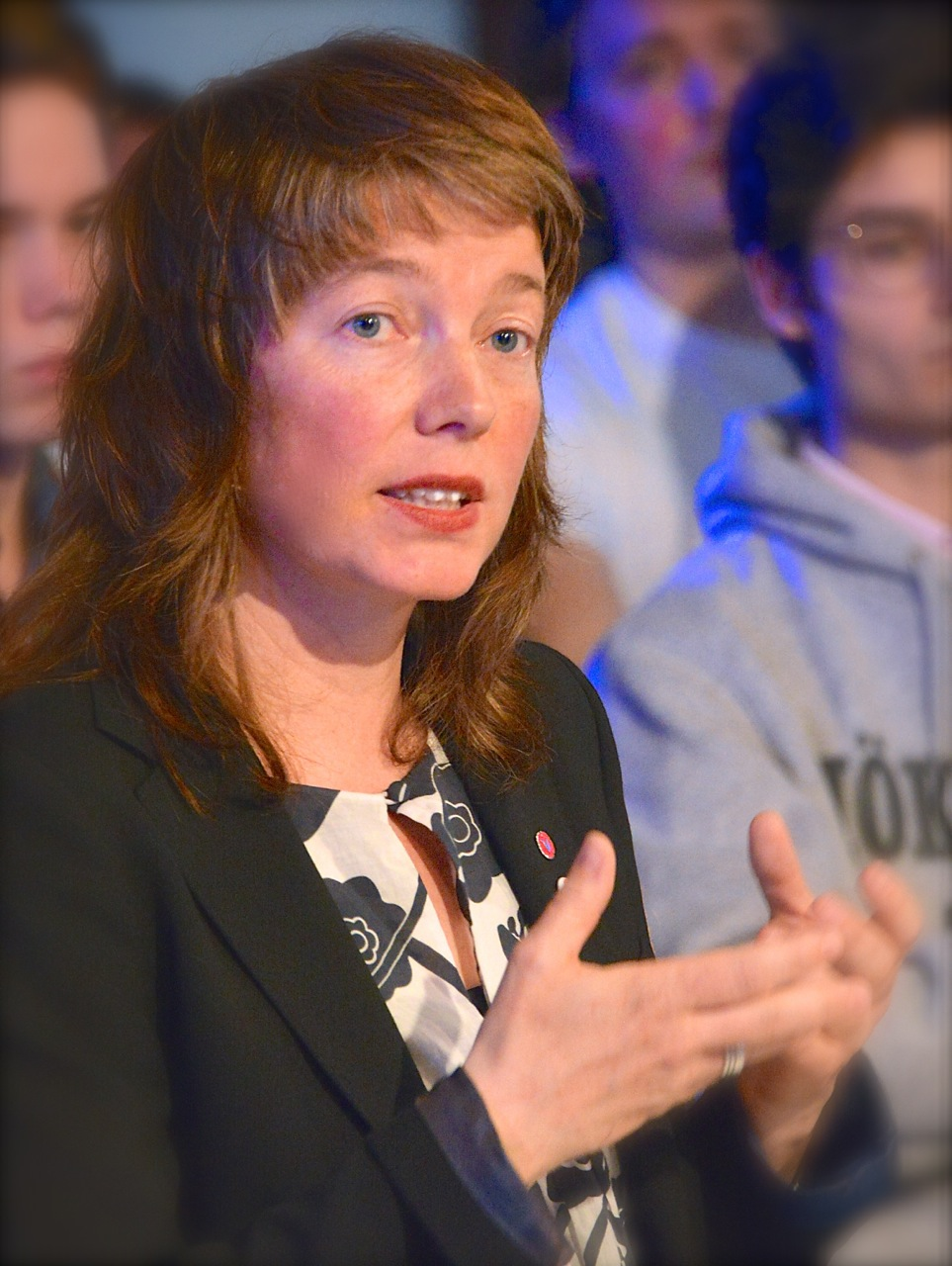

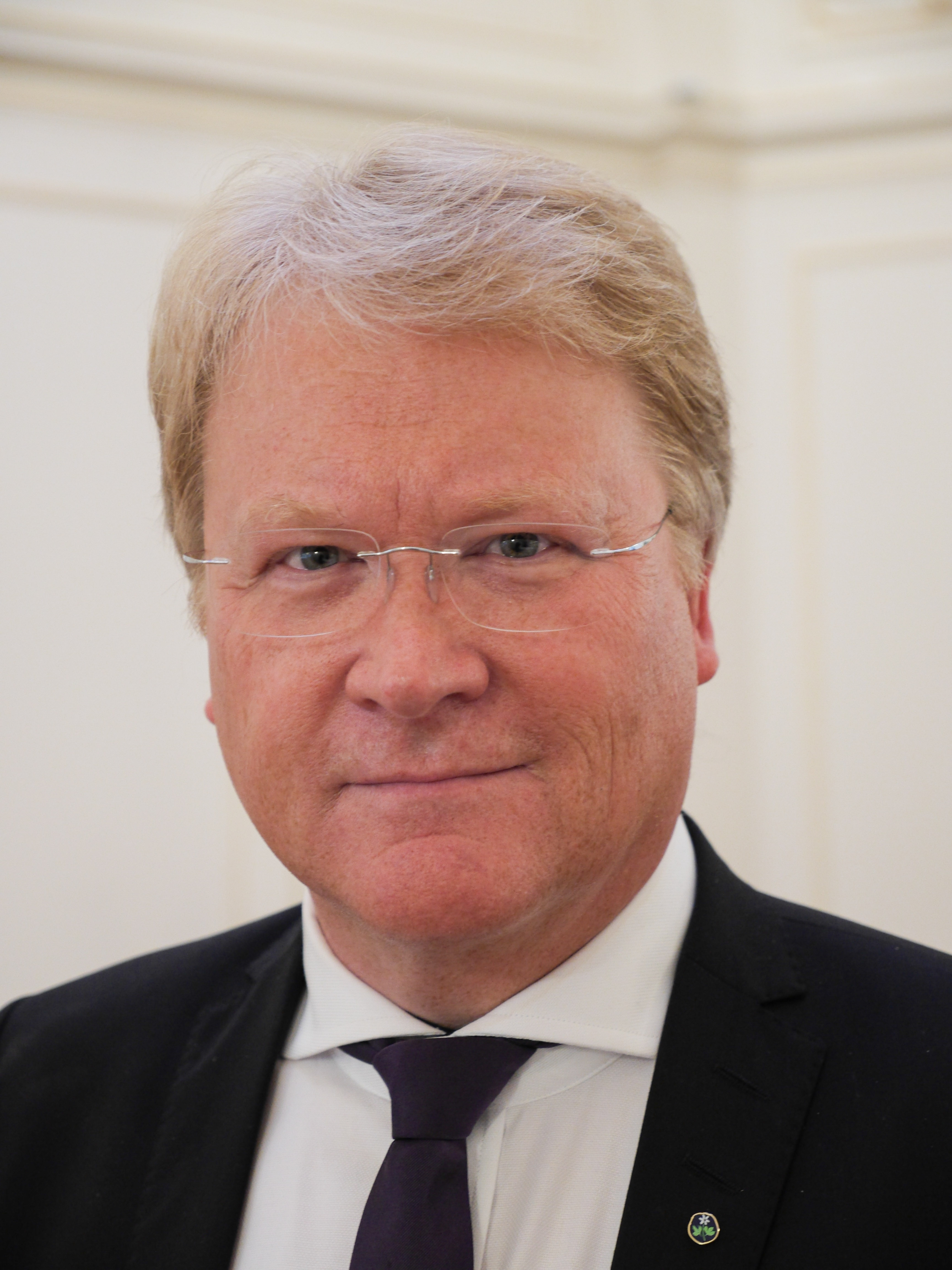

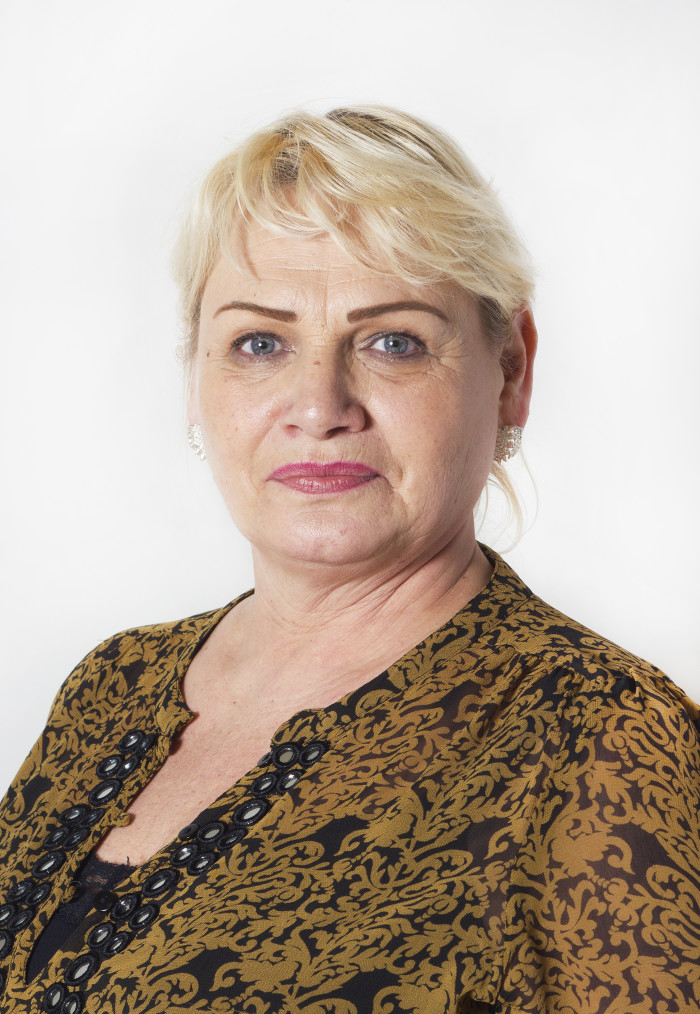
| | First party | Second party | Third party |
|---|---|---|---|
| Leader | Marita Ulvskog | Isabella Lövin | Gunnar Hökmark |
| Party | Social Democrats | Green | Moderate |
| Alliance | S&D | Greens/EFA | EPP |
| Last election | 6 seats, 24.4% | 2 seats, 11.0% | 4 seats, 18.8% |
| Seats won | 5 | 4 | 3 |
| Seat change | ▼1 | ▲2 | ▼1 |
| Popular vote | 899,074 | 572,591 | 507,488 |
| Percentage | 24.19% | 15.41% | 13.65% |
| Swing | ▼0.2% | ▲4.4% | ▼5.2% |
| | Fourth party | Fifth party | Sixth party |
| Leader | Marit Paulsen | Kristina Winberg | Kent Johansson |
| Party | Liberals | Sweden Democrats | Centre |
| Alliance | ALDE | EFDD | ALDE |
| Last election | 3 seats, 13.6% | 0 seats, 3.3% | 1 seat, 5.5% |
| Seats won | 2 | 2 | 1 |
| Seat change | ▼1 | ▲2 | 0 |
| Popular vote | 368,514 | 359,248 | 241,101 |
| Percentage | 9.91% | 9.67% | 6.49% |
| Swing | ▼3.7% | ▲6.4% | ▲1.0% |
| | Seventh party | Eighth party | Ninth party |
| Leader | Malin Björk | Lars Adaktusson | Soraya Post |
| Party | Left | Christian Democrats | Feminist Initiative |
| Alliance | GUE/NGL | EPP | S&D |
| Last election | 1 seat, 5.7% | 1 seat, 4.7% | 0 seats, 2.2% |
| Seats won | 1 | 1 | 1 |
| Seat change | 0 | 0 | ▲1 |
| Popular vote | 234,272 | 220,574 | 204,005 |
| Percentage | 6.30% | 5.93% | 5.49% |
| Swing | ▲0.6% | ▲1.2% | ▲3.3% |
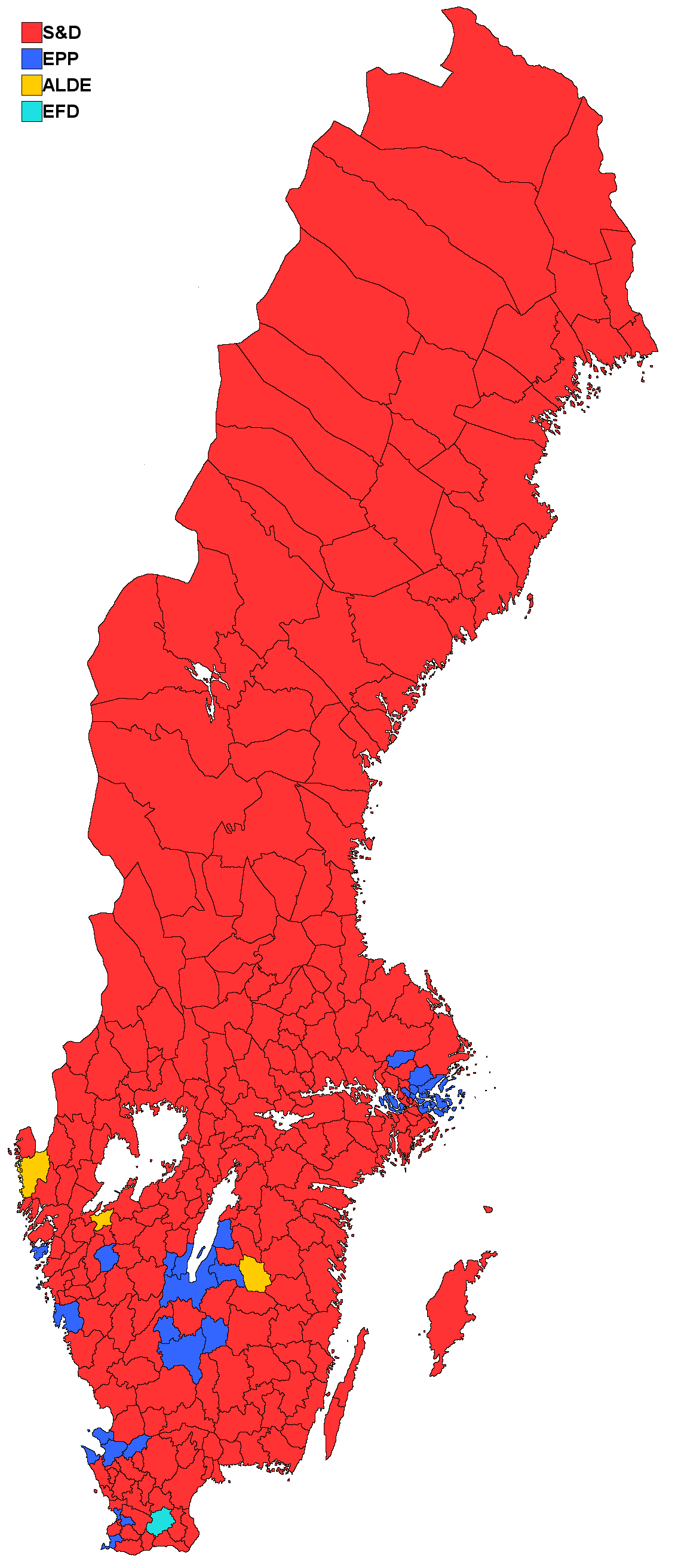

European Parliament elections in Sweden took place on 25 May 2014. At the election, twenty Members of the European Parliament (MEPs) were from the Swedish constituency. In the election, voters choose members of registered Swedish parties whose elected members then form political groups in the European Parliament, together with members of parties from other Member States with the same political affiliation.

As a result of the election, the Pirate Party lost their seats and Feminist Initiative won a seat for the first time.

== Previous result ==
Distribution of Sweden's mandate during the previous election, turnout was 45.53% in 2009

| Swedish party | Seats/20 | European party | Seats/754 |
|---|---|---|---|
| Social Democratic Party | 6 | Party of European Socialists | 195 |
| Moderate Party | 4 | European People's Party | 275 |
| Christian Democrats | 1 | European People's Party | 275 |
| Liberal People's Party | 3 | Alliance of Liberals and Democrats for Europe | 75 |
| Centre Party | 1 | Alliance of Liberals and Democrats for Europe | 75 |
| Green Party | 2 | European Green Party | 45 |
| Pirate Party | 2 | European Pirate Party | 2 |
| Left Party | 1 | Nordic Green Left Alliance | 2 |

== Results ==
| Party | Votes | % | Seats | +/– |
|---|---|---|---|---|
| Swedish Social Democratic Party | 899,074 | 24.19 | 5 | –1 |
| Green Party | 572,591 | 15.41 | 4 | +2 |
| Moderate Party | 507,488 | 13.65 | 3 | –1 |
| Liberals | 368,514 | 9.91 | 2 | –1 |
| Sweden Democrats | 359,248 | 9.67 | 2 | +2 |
| Centre Party | 241,101 | 6.49 | 1 | 0 |
| Left Party | 234,272 | 6.30 | 1 | 0 |
| Christian Democrats | 220,574 | 5.93 | 1 | 0 |
| Feminist Initiative | 204,005 | 5.49 | 1 | +1 |
| Pirate Party | 82,763 | 2.23 | 0 | –2 |
| June List | 11,629 | 0.31 | 0 | 0 |
| Animals' Party | 8,773 | 0.24 | 0 | New |
| Classical Liberal Party | 492 | 0.01 | 0 | New |
| European Workers Party | 170 | 0.00 | 0 | 0 |
| Swedish Multi-Democrats | 133 | 0.00 | 0 | New |
| Freedom and Justice Party | 106 | 0.00 | 0 | 0 |
| Socialist Welfare Party | 86 | 0.00 | 0 | New |
| True Democracy | 72 | 0.00 | 0 | New |
| Swedish National Democratic Party | 49 | 0.00 | 0 | 0 |
| 666 for an EU Superstate | 11 | 0.00 | 0 | 0 |
| Republican Right | 9 | 0.00 | 0 | 0 |
| Parties not on the ballot | 5,618 | 0.15 | 0 | – |
| Total | 3,716,778 | 100.00 | 20 | 0 |
| Valid votes | 3,716,778 | 98.88 | | |
| Invalid/blank votes | 42,173 | 1.12 | | |
| Total votes | 3,758,951 | 100.00 | | |
| Registered voters/turnout | 7,359,962 | 51.07 | | |
Source: Val

=== Elected members ===
Moderate Party

- Anna Maria Corazza Bildt
- Gunnar Hökmark
- Christofer Fjellner

Centre Party

- Fredrick Federley

Liberal People's Party

- Marit Paulsen
- Cecilia Wikström

Christian Democrats

- Lars Adaktusson

Social Democrats

- Marita Ulvskog
- Olle Ludvigsson
- Jytte Guteland
- Jens Nilsson
- Anna Hedh

Left Party

- Malin Björk

Green Party

- Isabella Lövin
- Peter Eriksson
- Bodil Ceballos
- Max Andersson

Sweden Democrats

- Kristina Winberg
- Peter Lundgren

Feminist Initiative

- Soraya Post
