= Peter Lundgren (politician) =

Swedish politician (born 1963)

Peter Lundgren MEP
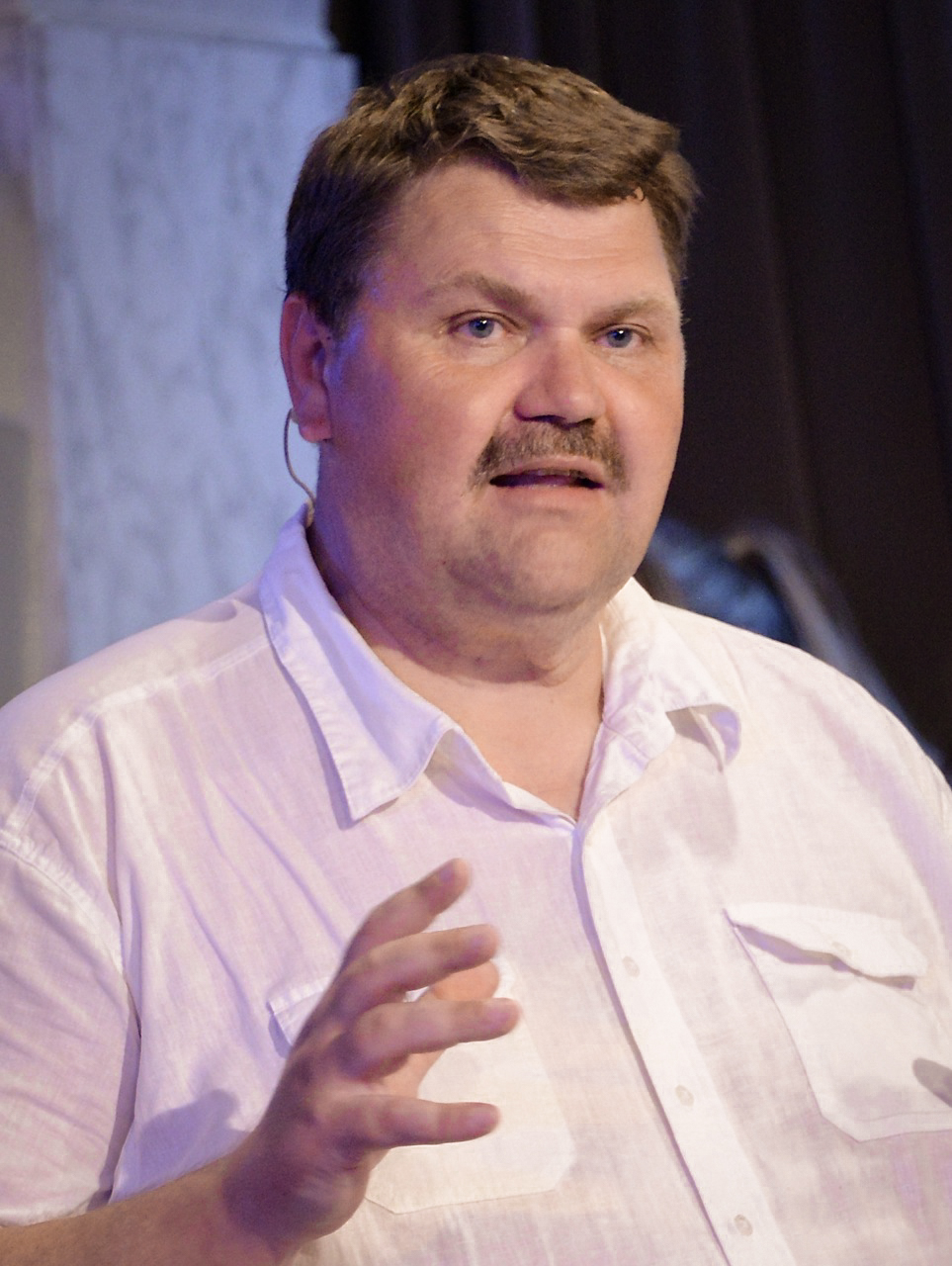
- Lundgren in 2014

Vice-chair of the European Conservatives and Reformists
- In office 2 July 2019 – 4 April 2022
- Succeeded by: Charlie Weimers
- Co-chairs: Raffaele Fitto; Ryszard Legutko
- Serving alongside: Roberts Zīle; Assita Kanko; Derk Jan Eppink; Hermann Tertsch

Member of the European Parliament
- In office 14 July 2014 – 16 July 2024
- Constituency: Sweden

Personal details
- Born: Kent Peter Lundgren; 2 February 1963 (age 63) Bjuv, Sweden
- Party: Independent (2019-)
- Other party: Sweden Democrats

Kent Peter Lundgren (born 2 February 1963) is a Swedish politician who was Member of the European Parliament (MEP), from Sweden, from 2014 to 2024. He was a member of the Sweden Democrats, part of European Conservatives and Reformists.

Lundgren was elected as Member of the European Parliament (MEP) in the May 2014 European Parliament election in Sweden. He was re-elected Member of the European Parliament in the 2019 European Parliament election in Sweden. In 2022, he left the Sweden Democrats in response to sexual misconduct allegations.

== Career ==
Lundgren is a former truck driver. He has been a member of the executive board of the Sweden Democrats since November 2013. Lundgren was launched as one of his party's top candidates to the European Parliament on 27 January 2014. On 25 May 2014, Lundgren and Kristina Winberg became the first representatives of the Sweden Democrats to be elected Members of the European Parliament.

In 2015, Lundgren was one of the nominees for the Parliament Magazine award as the best EU parliamentarian in the transport section. This was the very first nominee from the EFDD group. Lundgren did not win the award but said he was happy to be nominated.

Following his re-election to the European Parliament in 2019, Lundgren was elected one of six Vice-Chairs of the European Conservatives and Reformists Group.

== Sexual assault controversy ==
In March 2018, Lundgren was accused of groping a female colleague at a Sweden Democrats party event in Stockholm. In 2019, ahead of the 2019 European Parliament election in Sweden, Kristina Winberg, an MEP for the same party, was dropped from the party's ballot and later forced to leave the party on grounds of having "conspired to smear party colleagues with the help of the media" after Lundgren was confronted by an Expressen journalist over the allegations. Lundgren remained a candidate and was re-elected. In November 2021, the Göta Court of Appeal convicted him for the sexual assault, finding that it was "beyond a reasonable doubt" that he had "touched the breasts of the plaintiff against her will." He was sentenced to pay a 60-day fine.

In March 2022, the Swedish Supreme Court announced that it would not grant leave to appeal to Lundgren for him to work as an MEP. In response, it was announced that Lundgren would no longer represent the Sweden Democrats in Brussels over the conviction but would continue to sit in the European Parliament as an independent while keeping his party membership. Lundgren also stated he would contest the verdict at the European Court of Justice, arguing that he had been wrongly convicted.

== Personal life ==
He lives in Kulltorp and was member of the city council in Gnosjö Municipality until his election to the European Parliament in 2014.
