= Dassa =

Dassa may refer to:

- James Dassa, Mayor of Antwerp
- Dassa-Zoumé, Benin
- Dassa, Burkina Faso
