= Pouni Department =

Coordinates: 11.8°N 2.66667°W

Pouni
- Department
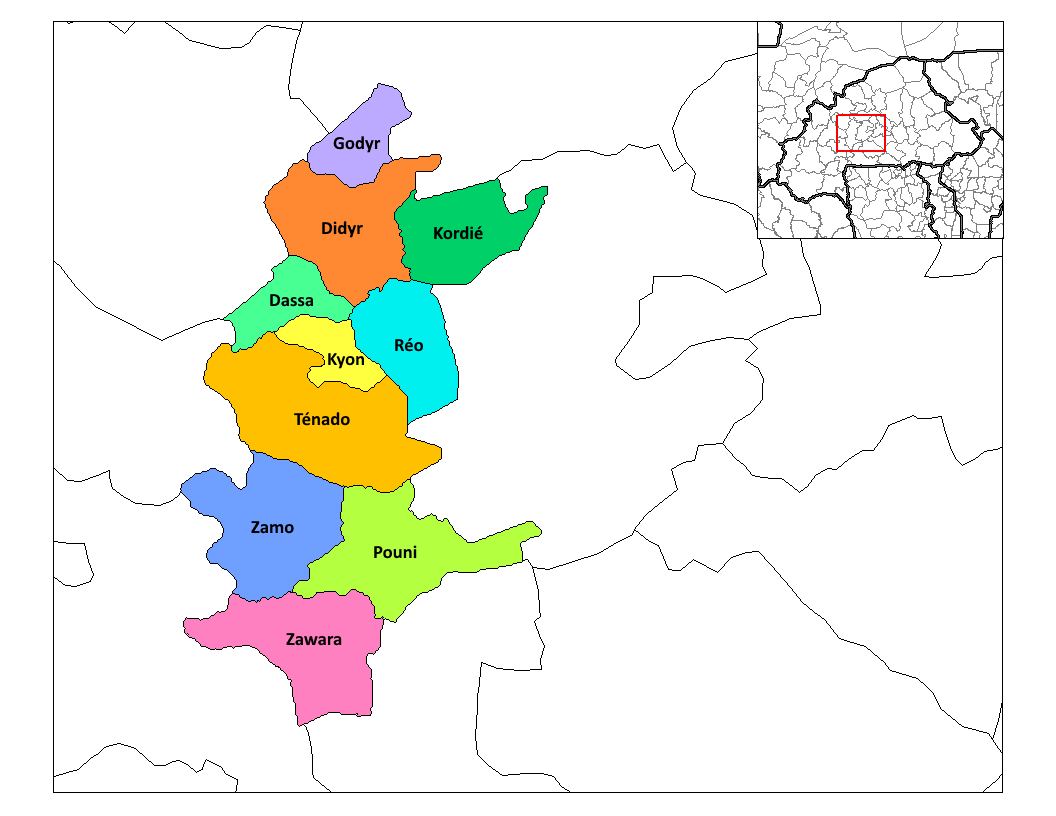
- Pouni Department location in the province
- Country: Burkina Faso
- Province: Sanguié Province

Area
  - Total: 259.8 sq mi (673.0 km^{2})

Population (2019 census)
  - Total: 57,067
  - Density: 219.6/sq mi (84.79/km^{2})
- Time zone: UTC+0 (GMT 0)

Pouni is a department or commune of Sanguié Province in central Burkina Faso. Its capital lies at the town of Pouni.
