= Réo =

- Location within Burkina Faso
- Coordinates: 12°19′N 2°28′W
- Country: Burkina Faso
- Region: Centre-Ouest Region
- Province: Sanguié Province
- Department: Réo Department
- Elevation: 284 m (932 ft)

Population (2019 census)
  - Total: 33,894
- Time zone: UTC+0 (GMT)
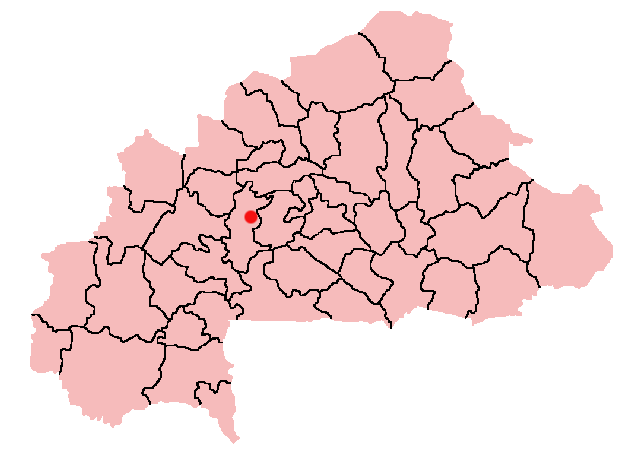
- Location of Réo in Burkina Faso

Réo is a city located in the province of Sanguié in Burkina Faso. It is the capital of Sanguié Province, and is in its own department.
