= Zawara Department =

Coordinates: 11°47′N 2°35′W

Zawara
- Department
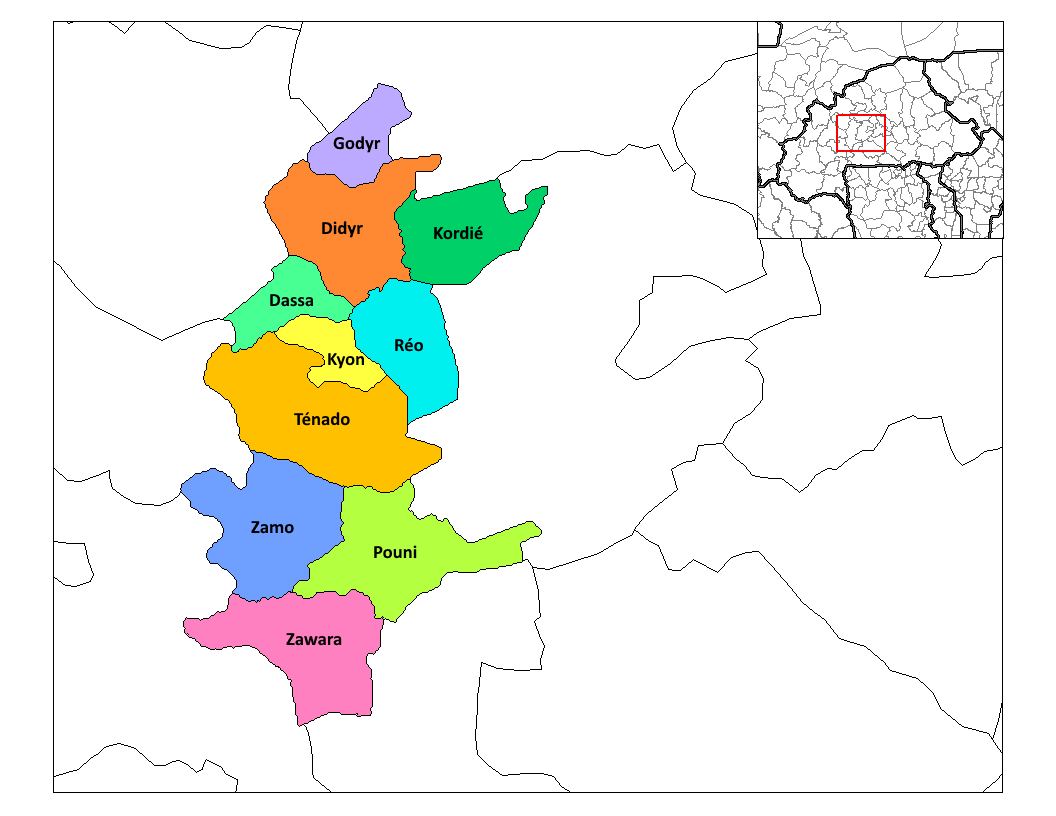
- Zawara Department location in the province
- Country: Burkina Faso
- Province: Sanguié Province

Area
  - Total: 260.9 sq mi (675.8 km^{2})

Population (2019 census)
  - Total: 27,322
  - Density: 104.7/sq mi (40.43/km^{2})
- Time zone: UTC+0 (GMT 0)

Zawara is a department or commune of Sanguié Province in central Burkina Faso. Its capital lies at the town of Zawara.
