= Kristina Winberg =

Swedish politician

Kristina Winberg MEP
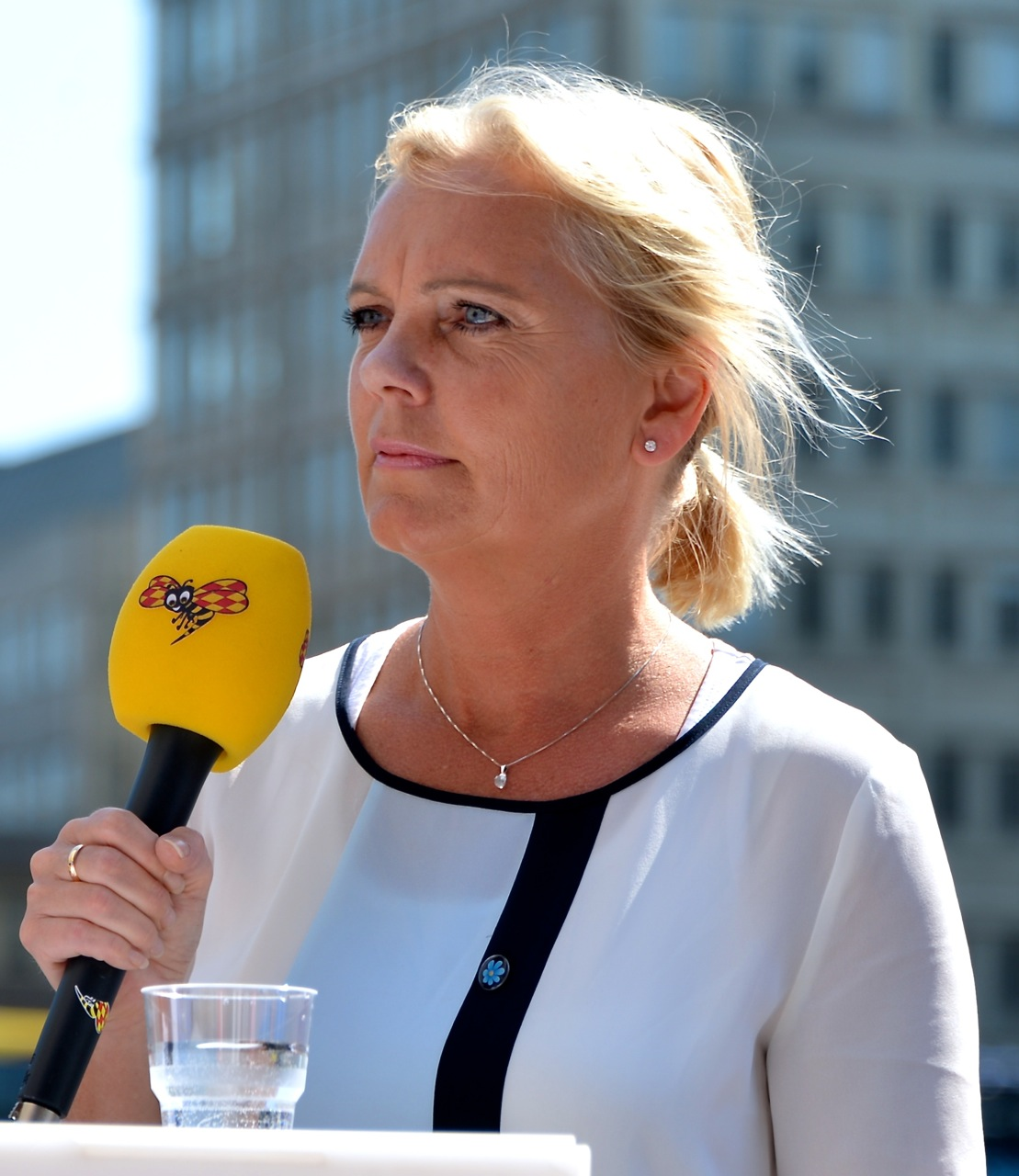
- Winberg in May 2014

Member of the European Parliament
- In office 1 July 2014 – 2 July 2019
- Constituency: Sweden

Personal details
- Born: Kristina Eva Martina Winberg; 27 May 1965 (age 61) Karlshamn, Sweden
- Party: Swedish; Sweden Democrats; EU; European Conservatives and Reformists
- Education: Stockholm University

Kristina Eva Martina Winberg (born 27 May 1965) is a Swedish former politician who was a Member of the European Parliament (MEP) representing the Sweden Democrats, part of the European Conservatives and Reformists. She was elected to the European Parliament in the 2014 European Parliament election in Sweden. In 2019, she was excluded from the Sweden Democrats.

== Career ==
Winberg sold advertising for the Jönköpings-Posten newspaper for 8 years, was a travel agent for 15 years, and then became a nursing assistant caring for people with dementia. In 2010 she was a candidate for the Riksdag; she has been a member of the city council in Jönköping Municipality since 2010.

Winberg was launched as her party's top candidate to the European Parliament on 27 January 2014. On 25 May 2014, Winberg and Peter Lundgren became the first representatives of the party to be elected Members of the European Parliament.

In December 2016, she was barred from attending a meeting with the Israeli Deputy Foreign Minister, Tzipi Hotovely, because the state of Israel considers the Sweden Democrats to have "sometimes neo-Nazi views", according to the Jewish Telegraphic Agency. In protest, Becky Norton Dunlop, the Ronald Reagan Distinguished Fellow at The Heritage Foundation, who served on the transition team of president-elect Donald Trump, canceled the meeting.

A few days before the 2019 elections to the European Parliament, Winberg was excluded from the party ballot of the Sweden Democrats, and soon after that she was forced to leave the party.
