= Malin Björk =

Swedish politician

Malin Björk MEP
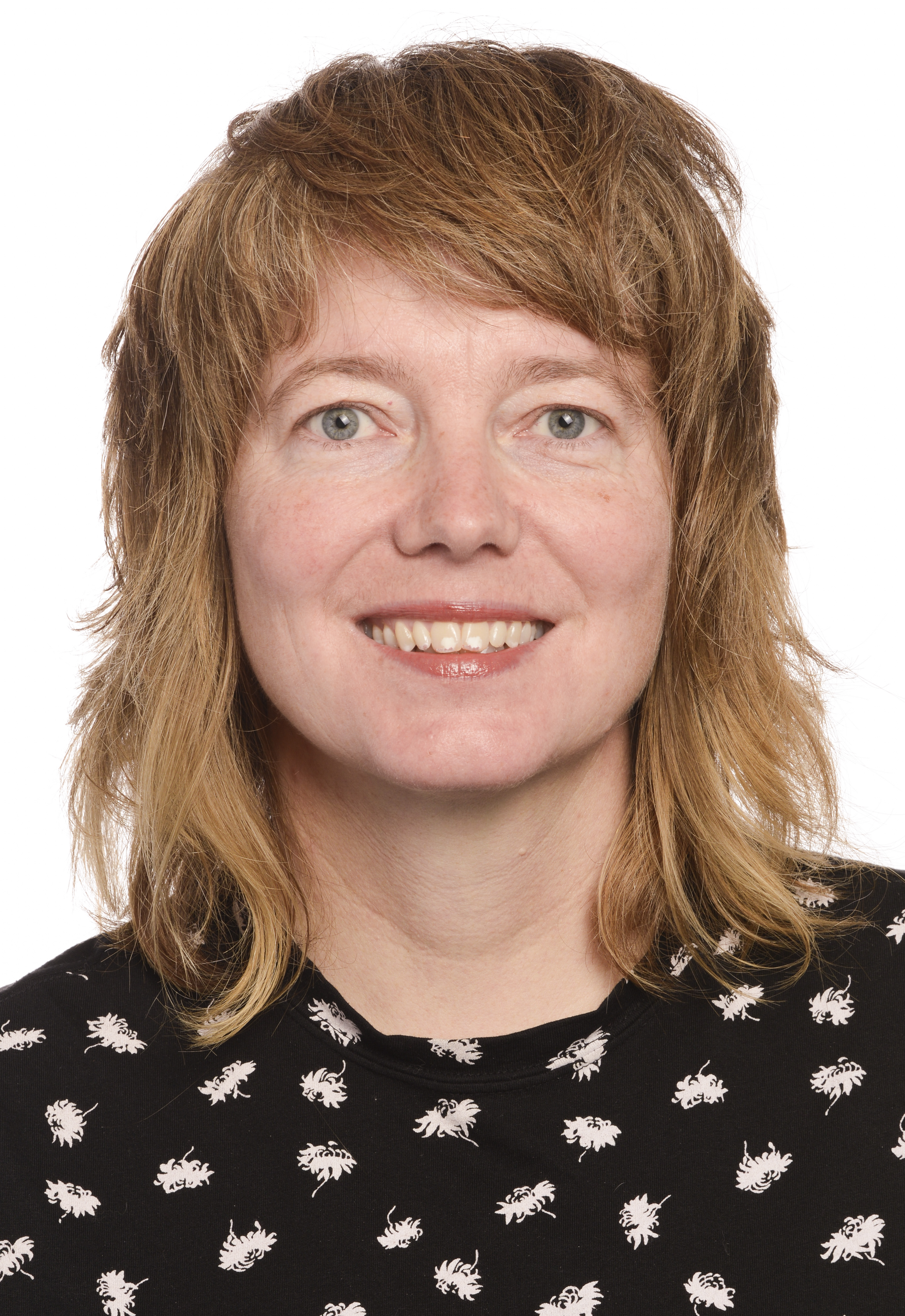

Member of the European Parliament
- In office 1 July 2014 – 15 July 2024
- Constituency: Sweden

Member of the Riksdag
- Incumbent
- Assumed office 28 September 2026

Personal details
- Born: Malin Anna Björk; 22 May 1972 (age 54) Gothenburg, Sweden
- Party: Swedish; Left Party; EU; European United Left–Nordic Green Left
- Children: 2
- Website: eu.vansterpartiet.se

Malin Anna Björk (born 22 May 1972) is a Swedish politician who was a Member of the European Parliament (MEP) of the Swedish Left Party and The Left (GUE/NGL) from 2014 to 2024. She was a full member of the parliament's Committee on Environment, Public Health, and Food Safety (ENVI) and a substitute member of the Committee on Civil Liberties, Justice, and Home Affairs (LIBE).

She was the European Parliament's rapporteur on the EU resettlement framework. In October 2017, her proposal to resettle around 240 000 refugees per year in the EU member states was approved in the LIBE committee.

Together with her colleague Eleonora Forenza, she is the author of a report on gender and trade, which calls for a more gender-sensitive EU trade policy. The report was adopted in the FEMM Committee and the Committee on International Trade in January 2018.

Björk worked for several years for the European Women's Lobby in Brussels. In 2009, she took up a job as a political advisor in the Committee on Women's Rights and Gender Equality for the committee's GUE/NGL coordinator Eva-Britt Svensson.

She was the Left Party's top candidate in the 2014 European Parliament election, after she narrowly won a fight for the position against incumbent MEP Mikael Gustafsson. She was elected as the sole member for the party.

As a feminist, during the election campaign, she focused on feminist issues, as well as anti-racism, LGBT rights, protection of welfare and workers' rights, and opposition to austerity policies. She seeks stronger measures against social dumping, including overturning the principle of the ruling in the case Laval Un Partneri Ltd v Svenska Byggnadsarbetareforbundet, which held that the right to strike is limited if it disproportionately affected the right to establish, or provide, business in the EU. She opposes the proposal to create a Transatlantic Free Trade Area.

In April 2014, Björk refused to buckle her seat belt on board in a Swedish plane, after she became aware that the plane would transport an asylum seeker from Iran who was about to get deported. As a result, the man was transferred to another place. He was later granted a permanent residency permit in Sweden.

She lives in Brussels with her partner and their two children.
