= Zamo (department) =

- Department
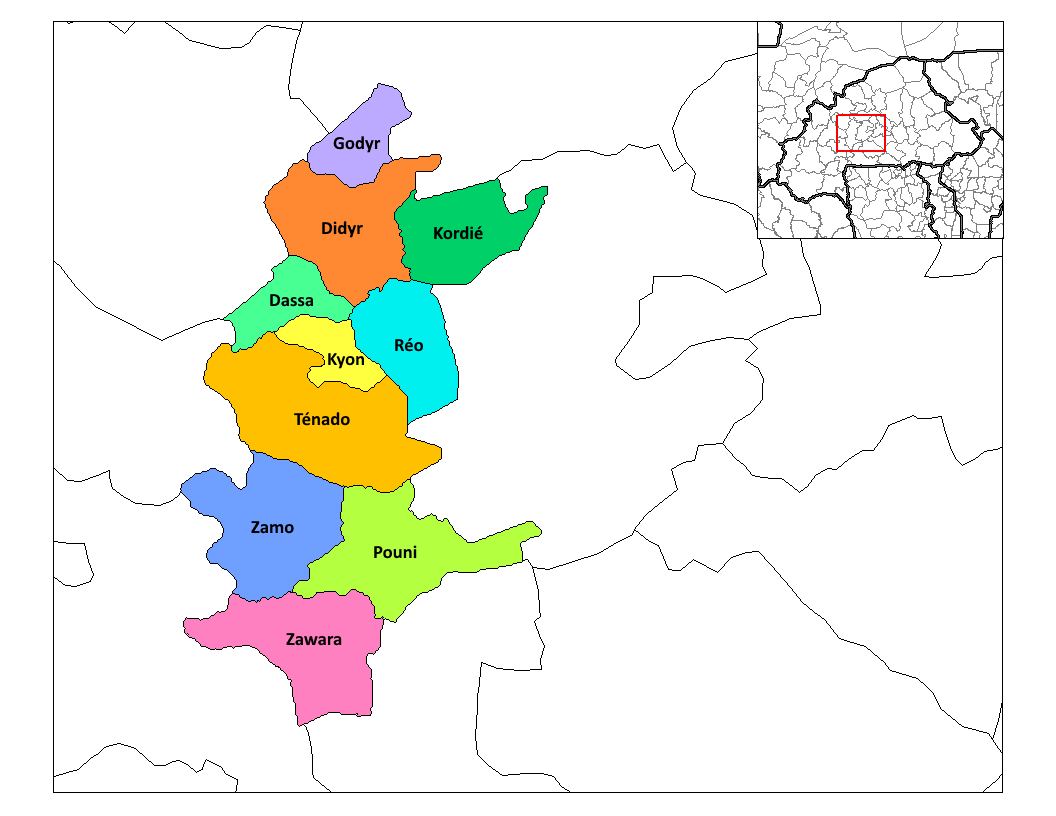
- Zamo Department location in the province
- Country: Burkina Faso
- Region: Centre-Ouest Region
- Province: Sanguié Province

Population (2012)
  - Total: 15,548
- Time zone: UTC+0 (GMT 0)

Zamo is a department or commune of Sanguié Province in Burkina Faso.

== Cities ==
The town is composed of a chief town :

- Zamo

and 7 villages:

- Bekaporé
- Bounga
- Bow
- Guigui
- Koualio
- Lia
- Sadouan.
