= Dassa Department =

Coordinates: 12°27′N 2°42′W

Dassa
- Department
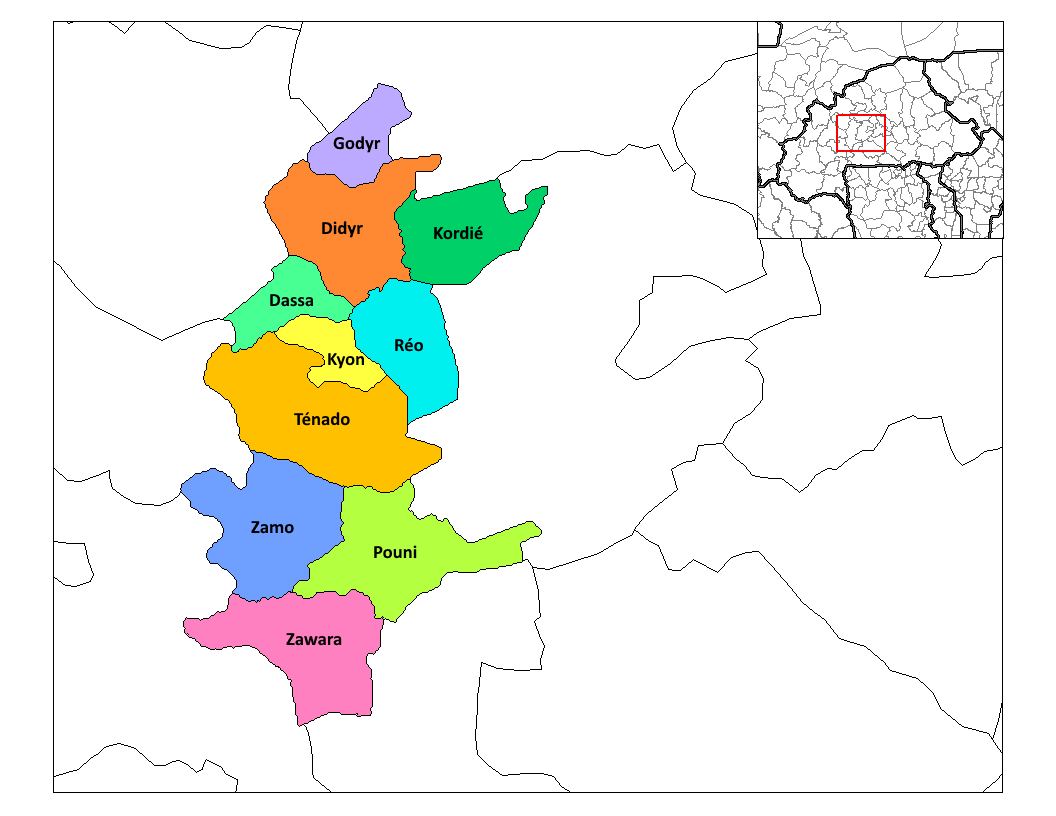
- Dassa Department location in the province
- Country: Burkina Faso
- Province: Sanguié Province

Area
  - Total: 94.4 sq mi (244.6 km^{2})

Population (2019 census)
  - Total: 20,411
  - Density: 216.1/sq mi (83.45/km^{2})
- Time zone: UTC+0 (GMT 0)

Dassa is a department or commune of Sanguié Province in central Burkina Faso. Its capital lies at the town of Dassa.
