= Kyon Department =

Coordinates: 12°17′N 2°34′W

Kyon
- Department
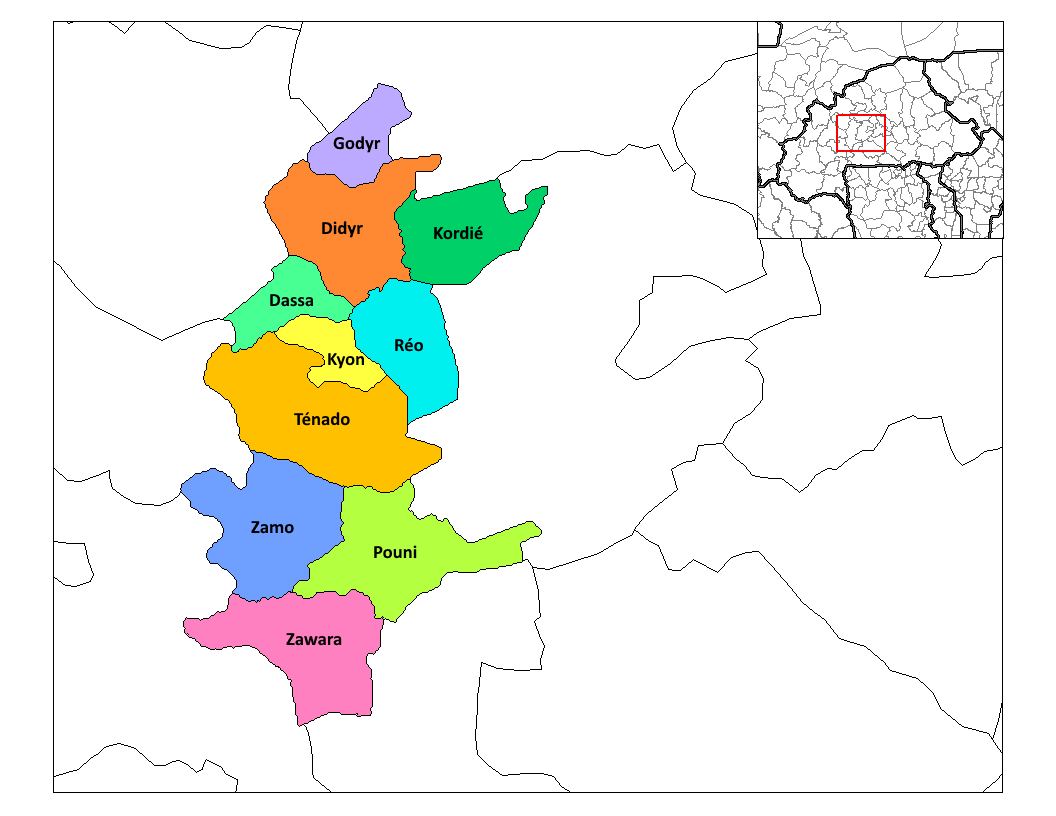
- Khyon Department location in the province
- Country: Burkina Faso
- Province: Sanguié Province
- Time zone: UTC+0 (GMT 0)

Kyon is a department or commune of Sanguié Province in central Burkina Faso. Its capital lies at the town of Kyon.
