= Godyr Department =

Coordinates: 12°42′N 2°37′W

Godyr
- Department
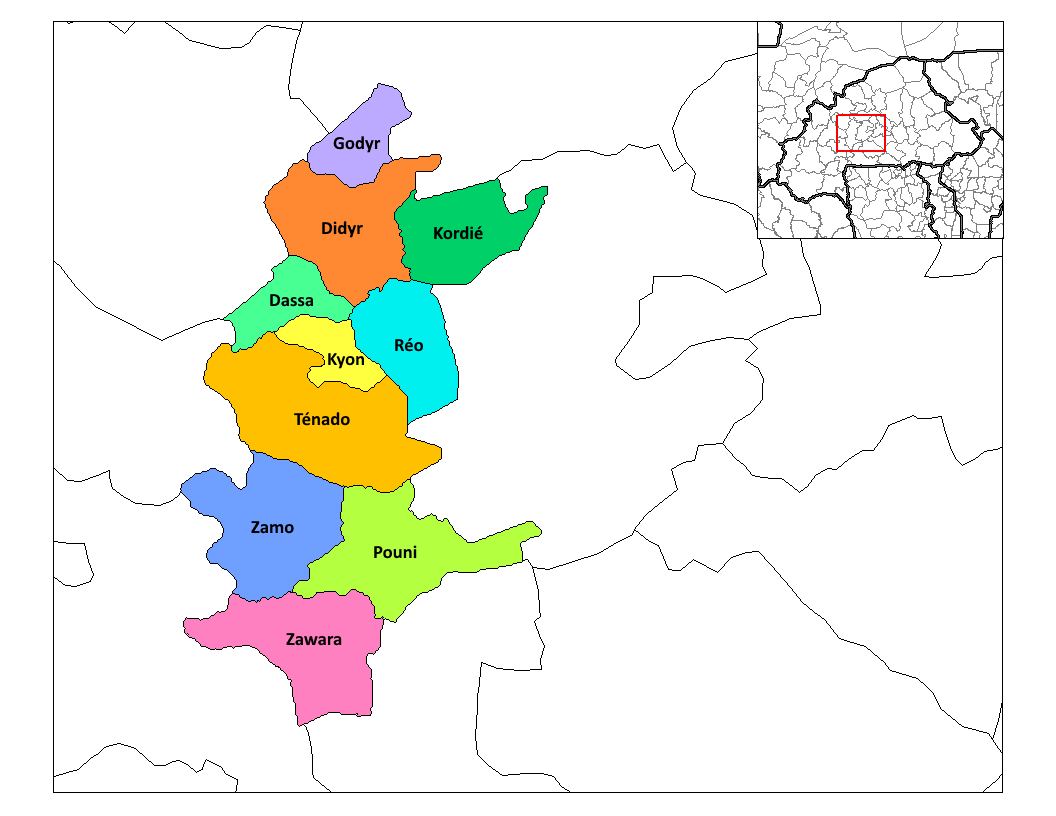
- Godyr Department location in the province
- Country: Burkina Faso
- Province: Sanguié Province

Area
  - Total: 95.4 sq mi (247.2 km^{2})

Population (2019 census)
  - Total: 23,824
  - Density: 249.6/sq mi (96.38/km^{2})
- Time zone: UTC+0 (GMT 0)

Godyr is a department or commune of Sanguié Province in central Burkina Faso. Its capital is the town of Godyr.

== Notable people ==
- Assita Kanko
