= Didyr Department =

Coordinates: 12°34′00″N 2°37′00″W

Didyr
- Department
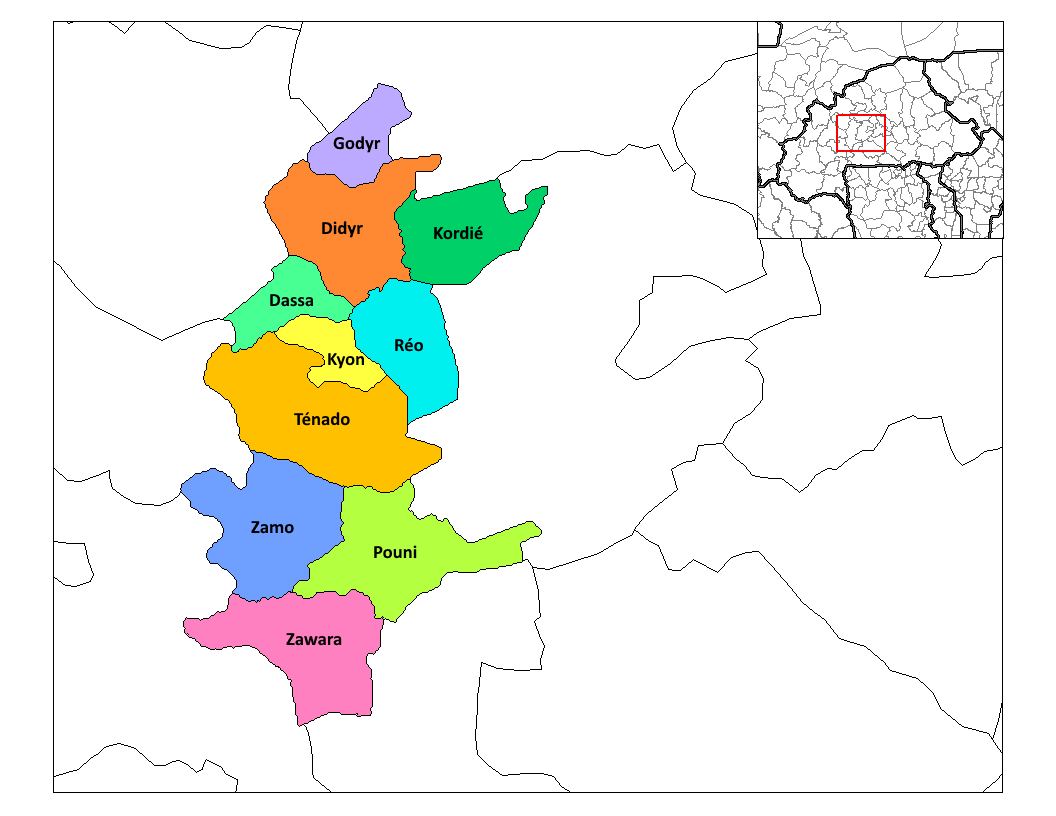
- Didyr Department location in the province
- Country: Burkina Faso
- Province: Sanguié Province

Area
  - Total: 243.8 sq mi (631.5 km^{2})

Population (2019 census)
  - Total: 53,361
  - Density: 218.9/sq mi (84.50/km^{2})
- Time zone: UTC+0 (GMT 0)

Didyr is a department or commune of Sanguié Province in central Burkina Faso. Its capital is the town of Didyr.

== Towns and villages ==
The département consists of one town :

- Didyr

and 15 villages :

- Barla
- Bouldié
- Douloulcy
- Goko
- Goumi
- Imouga
- Kya
- Ladiana
- Ladiou
- Mogueya
- Mousseo
- Mouzoumou
- Pouni-Nord
- Yamadio
- Youloupo
