= Kordié =

- Location within Burkina Faso, West Africa
- Coordinates: 12°36′N 2°22′W
- Country: Burkina Faso
- Region: Centre-Ouest Region
- Province: Sanguié Province
- Department: Kordié Department
- Time zone: UTC+0 (GMT)

Kordié is a city located in the province of Sanguié in Burkina Faso. The population of Kordié commune recorded in the 2019 census was 26,227, of which 11,319 were males and 14,908 were females.
