= Pouni =

- Location within Burkina Faso, West Africa
- Coordinates: 11.824341°N 2.691650°W
- Country: Burkina Faso
- Region: Centre-Ouest Region
- Province: Sanguié Province
- Department: Pouni Department
- Time zone: UTC+0 (GMT)

Pouni is a town in the Centre-Ouest Region of Burkina Faso.
