= Ténado Department =

Coordinates: 12.2000°N 2.6000°W

Ténado
- Department
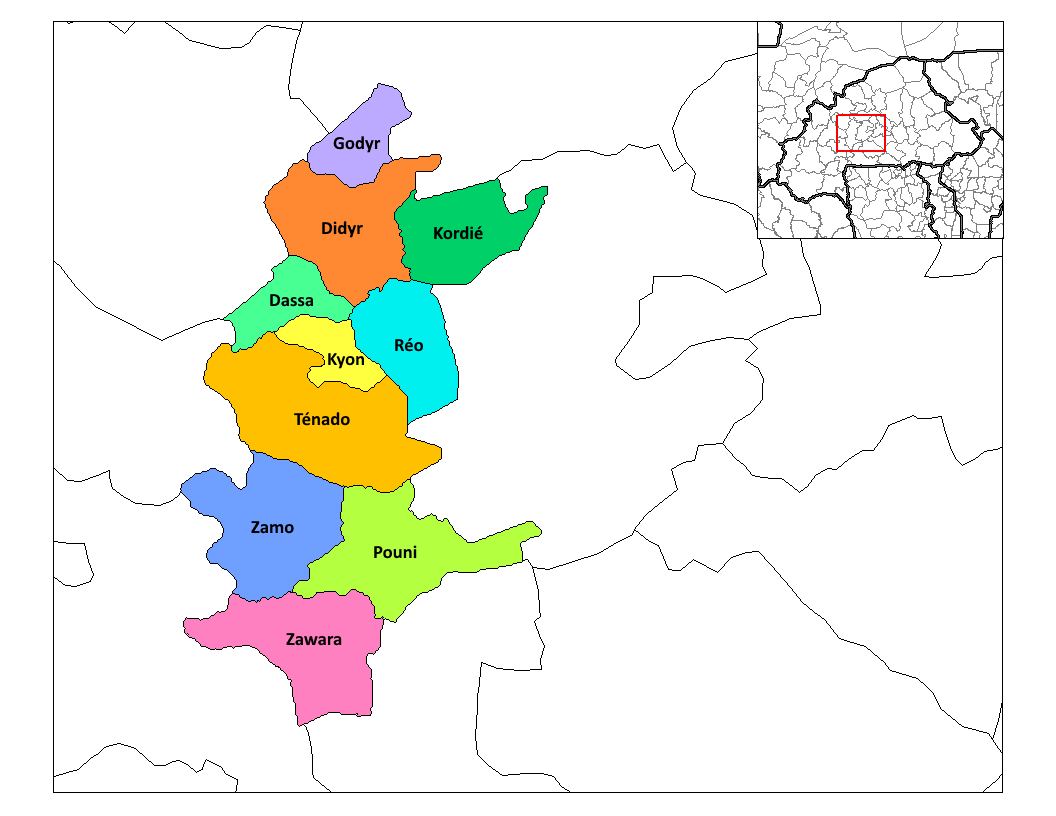
- Tenado Department location in the province
- Country: Burkina Faso
- Province: Sanguié Province

Area
  - Total: 346.9 sq mi (898.4 km^{2})

Population (2019 census)
  - Total: 60,190
  - Density: 173.5/sq mi (67.00/km^{2})
- Time zone: UTC+0 (GMT 0)

Ténado is a department or commune of Sanguié Province in central Burkina Faso. Its capital lies at the town of Ténado.
