= Kordie Department =

Coordinates: 12°36′N 2°22′W

Kordie
- Department
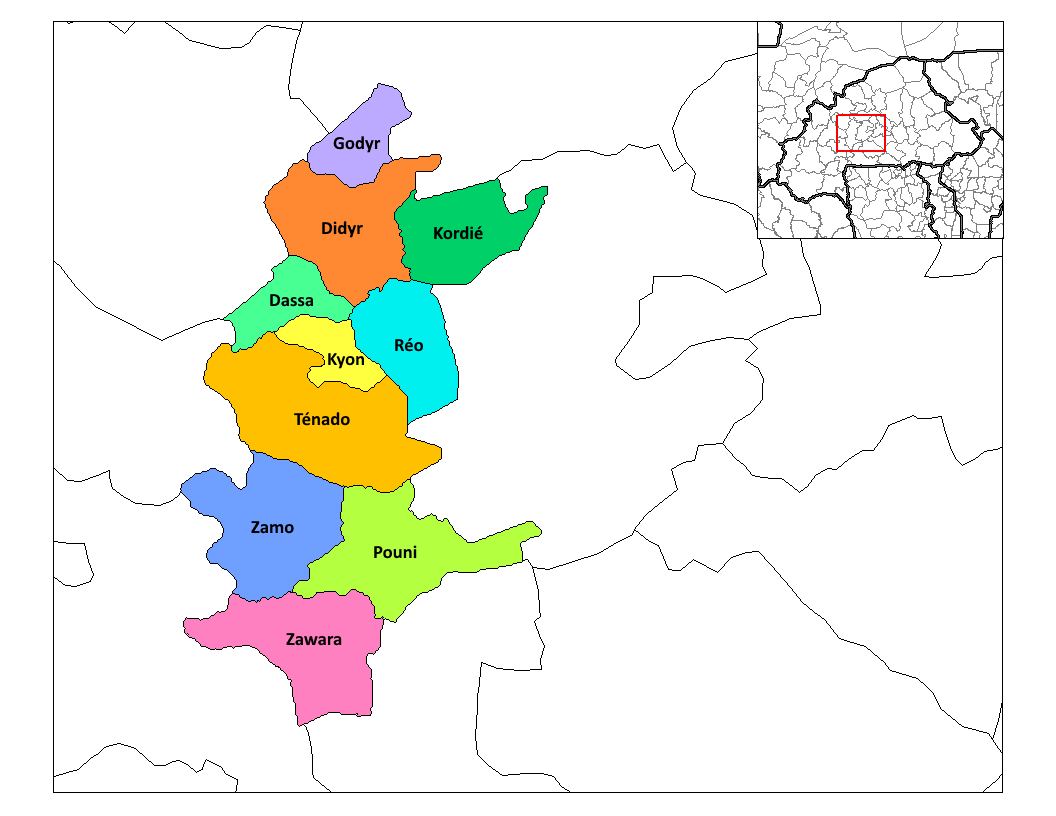
- Kordie Department location in the province
- Country: Burkina Faso
- Province: Sanguié Province
- Time zone: UTC+0 (GMT 0)

Kordie is a department or commune of Sanguié Province in central Burkina Faso. Its capital lies at the town of Kordie.
