= Réo Department =

Coordinates: 12.3170°N 2.4670°W

Réo
- Department
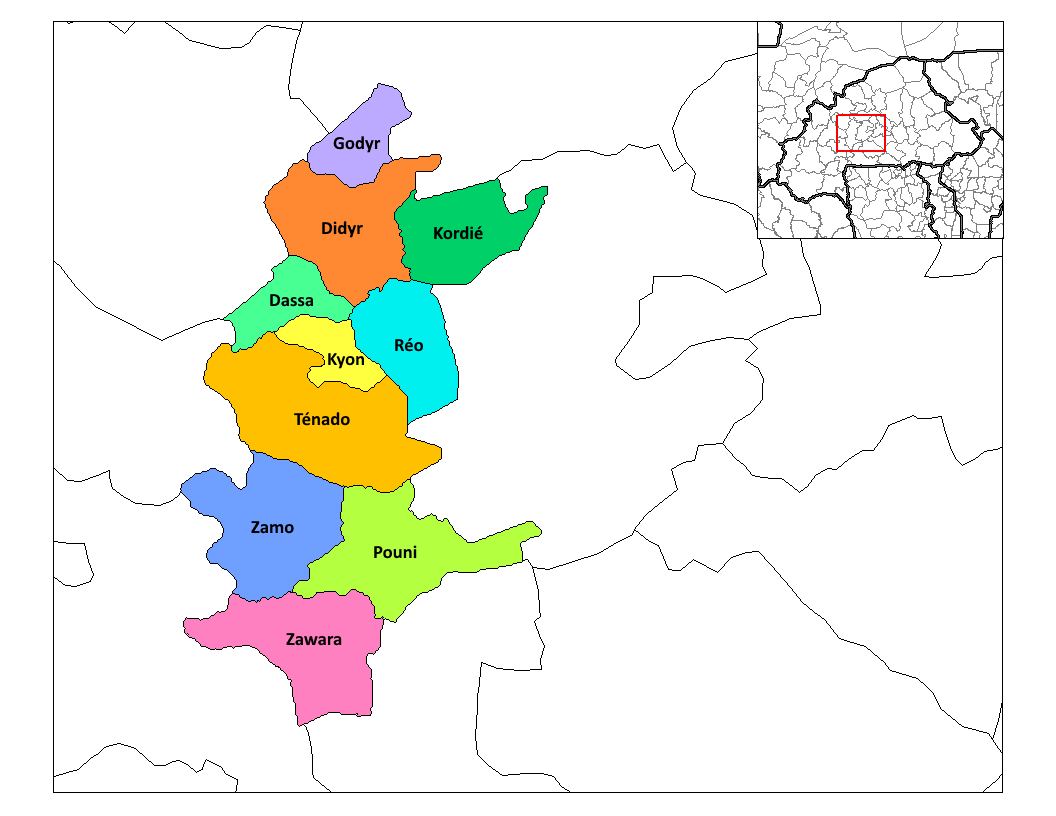
- Réo Department location in the province
- Country: Burkina Faso
- Province: Sanguié Province

Area
  - Department: 167 sq mi (432 km^{2})

Population (2019 census)
  - Department: 75,864
  - Density: 455/sq mi (176/km^{2})
  - Urban: 33,894
- Time zone: UTC+0 (GMT 0)

Réo is a department or commune of Sanguié Province in central Burkina Faso. Its capital is the town of Réo.
