= Sanguié Province =

Sanguie
- Province
- Location in Burkina Faso

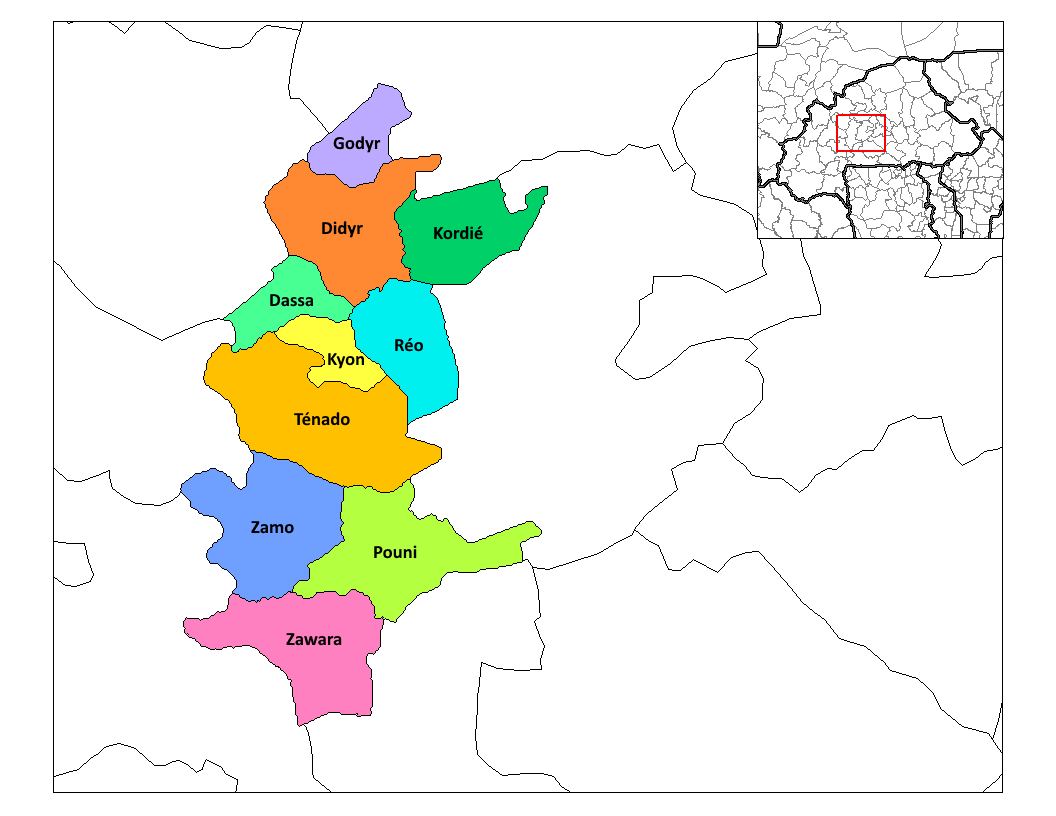
- Provincial map of its departments
- Coordinates: 12°19′N 2°28′E
- Country: Burkina Faso
- Region: Centre-Ouest Region
- Capital: Réo

Area
  - Province: 5,183 km^{2} (2,001 sq mi)

Population (2019 census)
  - Province: 391,520
  - Density: 75.54/km^{2} (195.6/sq mi)
  - Urban: 33,894
- Time zone: UTC+0 (GMT 0)

Sanguié is one of the 45 provinces of Burkina Faso, located in its Centre-Ouest Region. In 2019 the population was 391,520. Its capital is Réo.

Lyele is a major first language in this province.

== Education ==
In 2011 the province had 218 primary schools and 27 secondary schools.

== Healthcare ==
In 2011 the province had 34 health and social promotion centers (Centres de santé et de promotion sociale), 3 doctors and 66 nurses.

== Transportation ==
As of June 2014 Sitarail operates a passenger train three times a week along the route from Ouagadougou to Abidjan which passes through the province and stops at Zamo.

== Departments ==
Sanguie is divided into 10 departments:

Department	Capital	Population (Census 2006)
Dassa Department	Dassa	14,782
Didyr Department	Didyr	41,604
Godyr Department	Godyr	19,379
Kyon Department	Kyon	18,124
Kordie Department	Kordie	20,400
Pouni Department	Pouni	38,666
Réo Department	Réo	59, 799
Tenado Department	Tenado	46,203
Zamo Department	Zamo	16,242
Zawara Department	Zawara	21,869

== See also ==
- Regions of Burkina Faso
- Provinces of Burkina Faso
- Departments of Burkina Faso
