= Lars Adaktusson =

Swedish politician (born 1955)

Lars Adaktusson MP
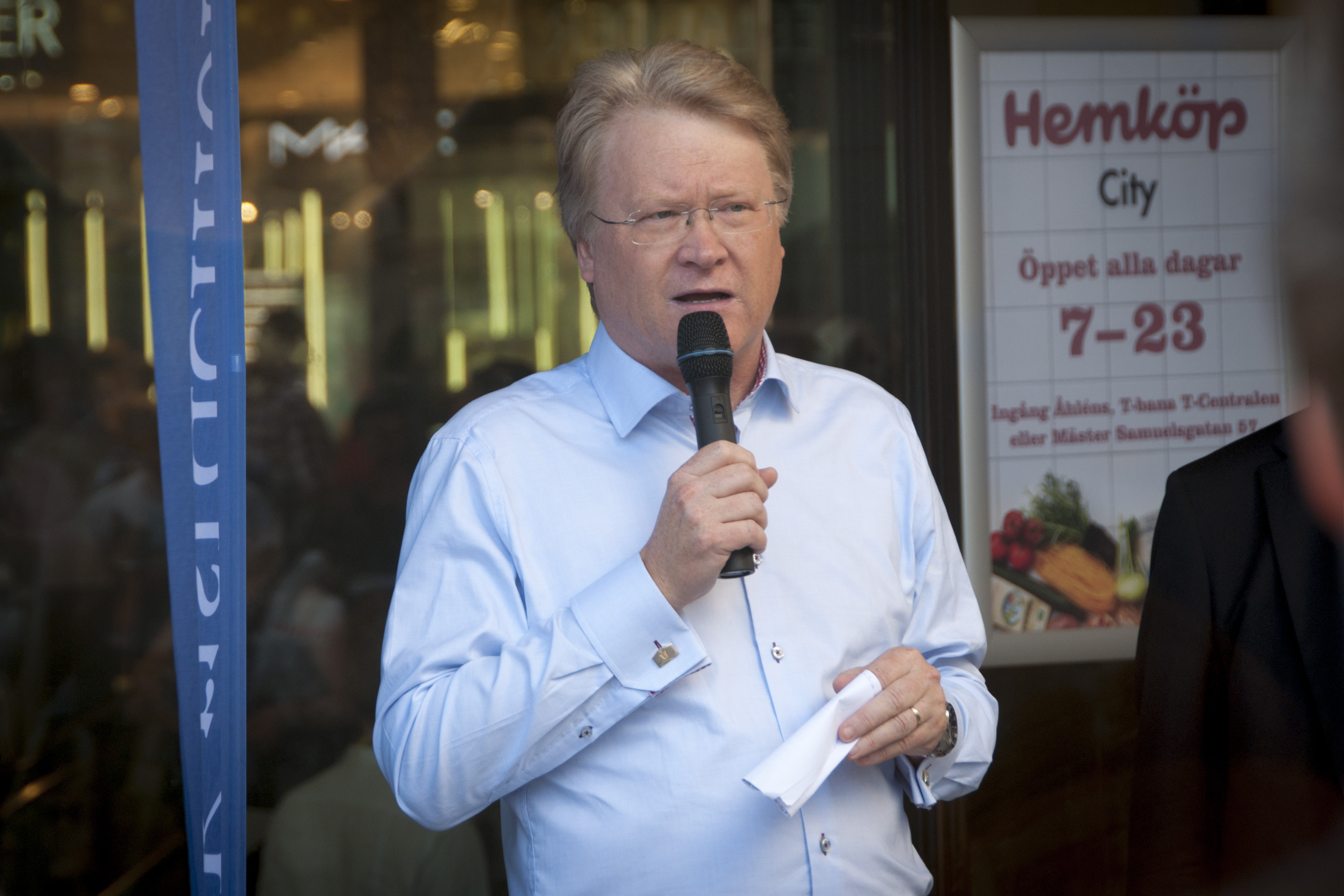
- Lars Adaktusson delivering a speech before the Swedish European Parliament election in May 2014

Member of the Riksdag
- In office 24 September 2018 – 26 September 2022
- Constituency: Dalarna County

Member of the European Parliament
- In office 1 July 2014 – 23 September 2018
- Constituency: Sweden

Personal details
- Born: Lars Göran Peter Adaktusson; 6 August 1955 (age 71) Jönköping, Sweden
- Party: Christian Democrats; European People's Party
- Spouse: Helen Adaktusson
- Children: 2
- Education: Örebro University; University of Gothenburg
- Website: adaktusson.eu/en/

Lars Göran Peter Adaktusson (born 6 August 1955) is a Swedish politician for the Christian Democrats. He served as a Member of the Riksdag from the 2018 general election until 2022. Prior to that, he was a Member of the European Parliament (MEP).

== Early career ==
An employee of public broadcaster Sveriges Television (SVT) for many years, Adaktusson has worked both as a reporter and a news anchor for the nightly news show Aktuellt, and has also been stationed as a foreign correspondent in Vienna, Washington DC, and in Amman.

== Member of the European Parliament ==
Adaktusson was elected as a Member of the European Parliament (MEP) in the 2014 European Parliament elections in Sweden. He has since been serving on the Committee on Foreign Affairs (AFET) and the Subcommittee on Human Rights (DROI). In addition to his committee assignments, he serves as vice-chairman of the parliament's delegation for relations with Afghanistan.

In February 2016, Adaktusson tabled a resolution recognizing the Islamic State militant group's (ISIS) systematic killing and persecution of religious minorities in the Middle East as a genocide, which the European Parliament unanimously passed.
