= Dassa, Burkina Faso =

- Location within Burkina Faso, West Africa
- Coordinates: 12°27′N 2°42′W
- Country: Burkina Faso
- Region: Centre-Ouest Region
- Province: Sanguié Province
- Department: Dassa Department
- Time zone: UTC+0 (GMT)

Dassa is a town and commune in Burkina Faso.
