= Max Andersson (politician) =

Swedish politician (born 1973)

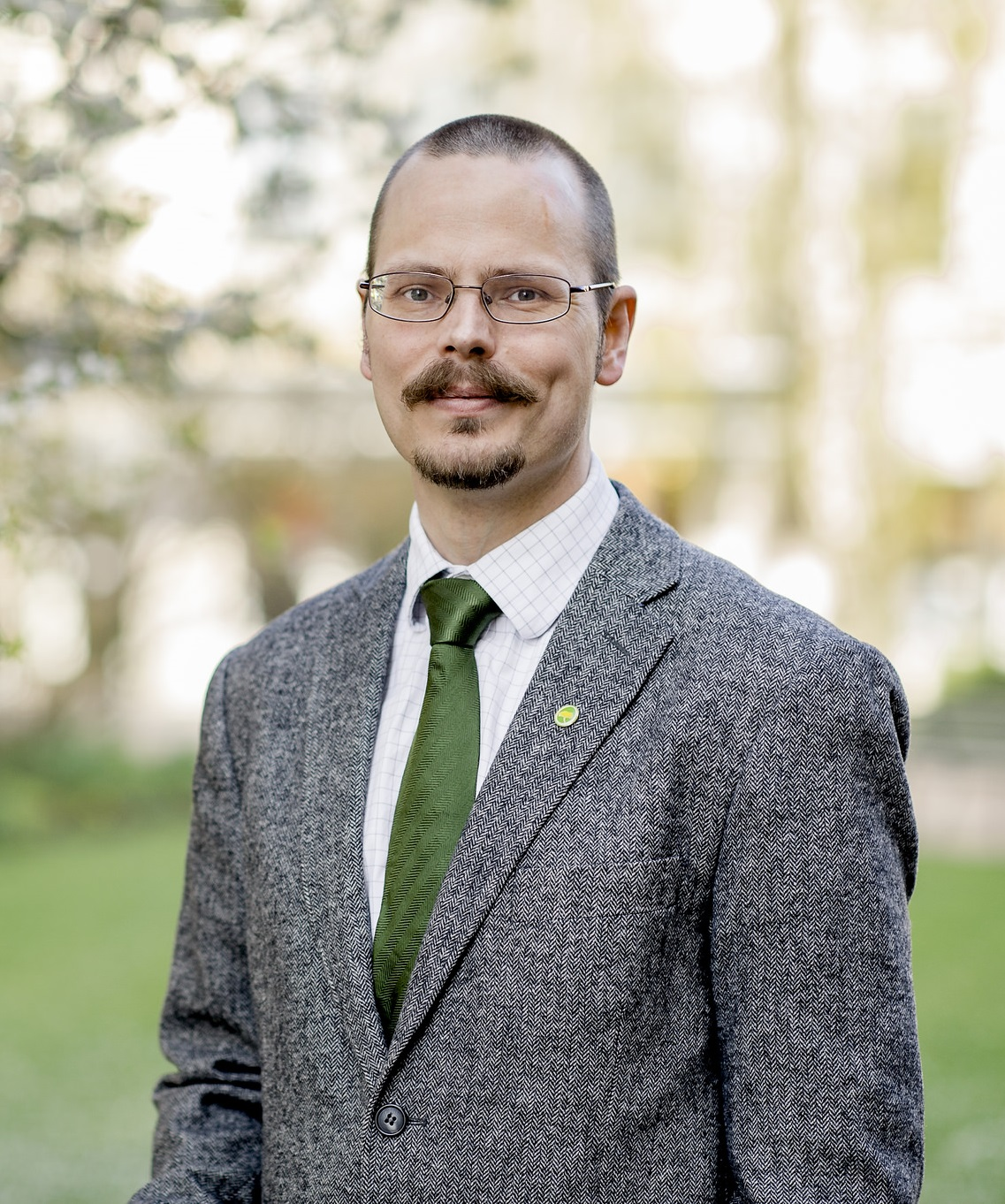

Member of the European Parliament
- In office 1 July 2014 – 2 July 2019
- Constituency: Sweden

Member of the Swedish Parliament
- In office 2 October 2006 – 4 October 2010
- Constituency: Gothenburg

Personal details
- Born: 26 October 1973 (age 52) Solna, Stockholm, Sweden
- Party: Green Party (until 2019); Partiet Vändpunkt (2019-)
- Website: Official website

Max Andersson (born 26 October 1973) is a Swedish politician. He was a Member of the Swedish Parliament, representing the Green Party, between 2006 and 2010, and a Member of the European Parliament (MEP) from 2014 until 2019.

In 2019, Andersson left the Green party to join the newly formed political party Vändpunkt.

== Parliamentary service ==
- Member, Committee on Legal Affairs
- Member, Delegation for relations with the People's Republic of China
