= Assita Kanko =

Belgian politician

Assita Kanko MEP
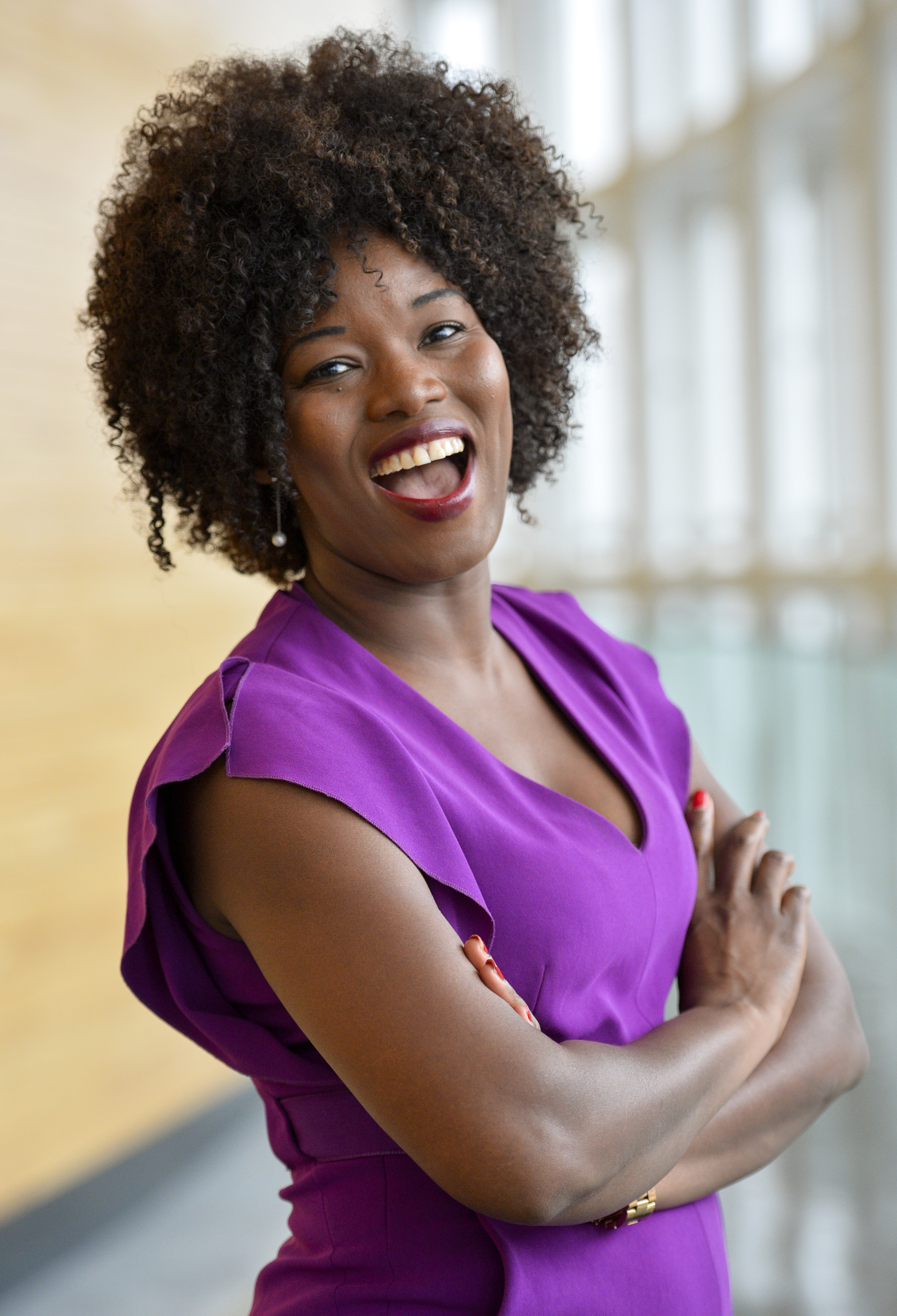

Member of the European Parliament for Belgium
- Incumbent
- Assumed office 2 July 2019
- Constituency: Dutch-speaking electoral college

Member of the Ixelles City Council
- In office 14 October 2012 – 14 October 2018

Personal details
- Born: Assita Adoua Kanko; 14 July 1980 (age 46) Godyr, Upper Volta (now Burkina Faso)
- Citizenship: Belgium; Burkina Faso
- Party: N-VA (2018–present)
- Other political affiliations: MR (2012–2018)
- Children: 1
- Education: JM International
- Occupation: Politician, human rights activist
- Website: www.assita-kanko.be

Assita Adoua Kanko (born 14 July 1980) is a Burkinabé-born Belgian human rights activist, author and politician.

She was elected as a Member of the European Parliament in 2019 representing the New Flemish Alliance and currently serves as a vice-chairwoman of the European Conservatives and Reformists group.

== Biography ==
=== Early life and education ===
Kanko was born in Godyr, Burkina Faso in 1980 to a Muslim family and grew up in a small village where her father worked as a teacher and according to Kanko was engaged in multiple polygamous relationships. She was subjected to female genital mutilation (FGM) as a child and has since campaigned for the practice to be banned. In a 2016 interview, Kanko explained that she was tricked into the procedure by her mother who told her she was being taken to a friend's house to play. At a young age, she discovered books by French feminist author Simone de Beauvoir and European enlightenment philosophers which made her question the society in which she was raised.

She has said her first exposure to politics was the assassination of Burkina Faso president Thomas Sankara. After the murder of the influential Burkinabè journalist Norbert Zongo in 1998, she studied journalism in Ouagadougou and took an interest in human rights activism. Kanko moved to the Netherlands in 2001 to continue journalism studies and settled in Brussels in 2004 after meeting her husband. She became a Belgian citizen in 2008. In 2010, she became a member of the think tank Liberales and worked as a parliamentary aide to the Flemish Open VLD party. From 2011 to 2015, Kanko worked in communications for the bank BNP Paribas before studying a master's degree in international politics at the CERIS-ULB Diplomatic School of Brussels. From 2015 to 2019, she worked for the Belgian Technical Cooperation (now Enabel) as a director and in 2018 was an advisor to Mouvement Réformateur (MR) politician Denis Ducarme on issues related to violence against women.

=== Political career ===
Kanko was elected as a municipal councillor in Ixelles for the French speaking Mouvement Réformateur in 2012. In 2018, she joined the Dutch speaking New Flemish Alliance (N-VA) party, stating that she supported the policies of the N-VA's migration spokesman Theo Francken and that stronger policies were needed to tackle human trafficking and illegal immigration.

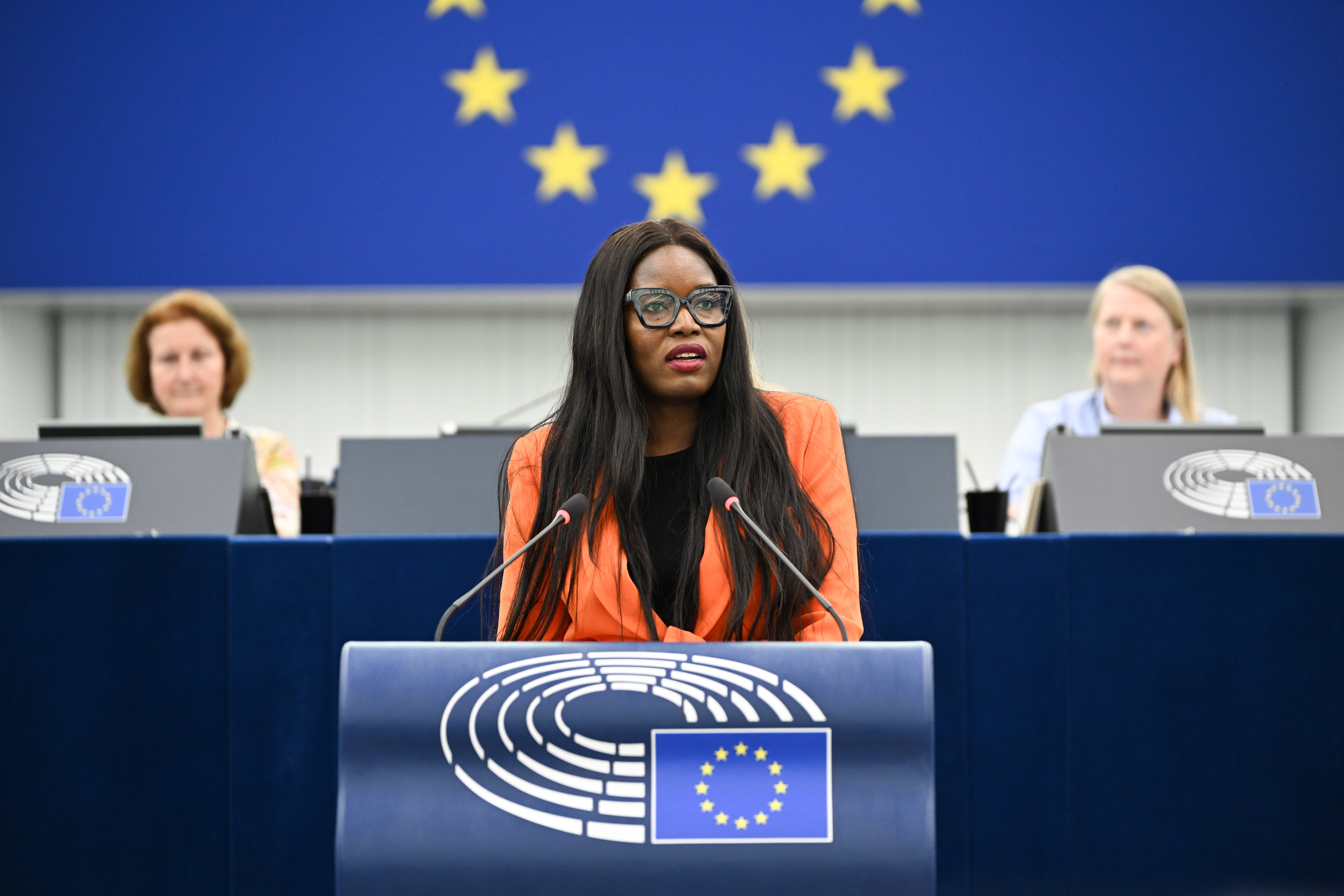
Assita Kanko speaking at the European Parliament plenary session, Strasbourg, 20 May 2026.

Kanko was elected to the European Parliament on the N-VA's list in 2019 and currently sits as a Vice-Chairwoman on the European Conservatives and Reformists group. In view of the apparent withdrawal of the United States from certain^{which ones?} global political issues, she supports a more active role of the European Union and assumes that if not, China would attempt to fill the void. In her role as an MEP she has also advocated for issues facing the African continent and called for increased cooperation in coordinating medical provisions for African nations during the COVID-19 pandemic.

In 2023, Kanko supported Ukraine during the 2022 Russian invasion of Ukraine and was critical of the EU's response, arguing the Union "woke up too late" to the problem and "took peace for granted". She argued against neutrality with Russian president Putin and supports sending surplus military equipment to Ukrainian forces, stating: "If I were Bambi, unarmed, why would I negotiate peace with a lion? I would see peace, but the lion would only see a meal."

In 2023, an investigation was opened against Kanko following complaints about her intimidating her parliamentary staff, a "culture of fear" in her office and related high turnover of staff, "improper demanding behavior" and psychological intimidation. This investigation was closed due to insufficient proof.

Following the October 7 attacks in Israel in 2023, Kanko called for Hamas to be "dismantled" during a speech in the European Parliament and argued the West should "not be naive about radical Islam." She has also called on Belgium and the European Union to review its funding towards UNRWA, arguing the organisation has become corrupted by Hamas. She has also spoken out against antisemitism in European and American universities.

In March 2024, Kanko was one of twenty MEPs to be given a "Rising Star" award at The Parliament Magazine's annual MEP Awards.

Kanko was reelected during the 2024 European Parliament elections and resumed her role as vice-chairwoman of the ECR group. In the 2024 Belgian municipal elections, she was elected as a councilor for the N-VA in Vilvoorde.

=== Activism and other work ===
In addition to her political work, Kanko has also been active as an author (see Bibliography), as an advisor to companies on how to best implement Sustainable Development Goals, and as a columnist for De Standaard.

Kanko has described herself as a women's rights activist and founded an organisation called Polin to encourage equal opportunities and more female involvement in politics. In her writing, she has spoken of the importance of defending European Enlightenment values, having responsible immigration policies and has argued for the stronger integration of immigrants into both European and Western society instead of pursuing multiculturalism. As a victim of FGM, Kanko has also worked with the AHA Foundation founded by Ayaan Hirsi Ali to combat FGM, forced marriages and human rights abuses.

In 2017, Kanko received the Ebony Spur award from the N-VA before she became a member, an annual award given by the party to an individual from a non-Flemish background who has made a special contribution to Flemish society. The award was presented by N-VA general secretary Louis Ide who justified the prize by stating: "As a politician, she tells a story about security, about the economy, about education that is a breath of fresh air in French-speaking Belgium. As a writer, her story gives female migrants the strength to escape the social pressure that they often still experience within their own communities and thus really build a new life here."

== Personal life ==
Kanko is married to a Belgian man and has one daughter (born 2008) and lives in Brussels with her family.

== Bibliography ==
- Omdat je een meisje bent. Verhaal van een besneden leven (Because you are a girl. Story of a circumcised life) s.l. : Doorbraak, 2019
- Leading ladies: maak je ambities waar (Leading ladies: realize your ambitions) Tielt: Lannoo, 2018
- De tweede helft. Tijd voor een nieuw feminisme (The second half. Time for a new feminism) [Tielt] : Lannoo, 2015
