= Jens Nilsson =

Swedish politician (1948–2018)

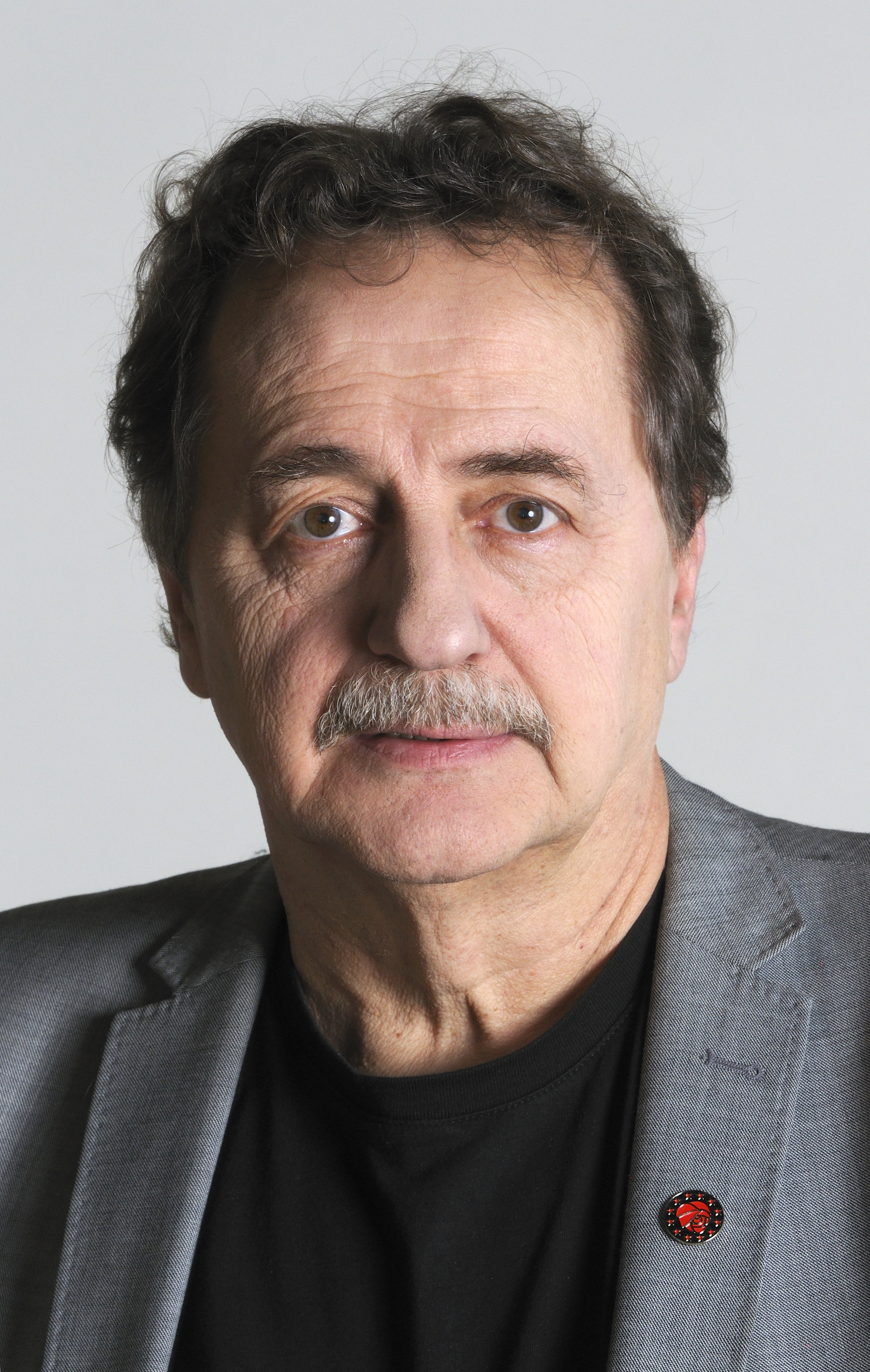

Member of the European Parliament
- In office 1 December 2011 – 13 March 2018
- Constituency: Sweden

Personal details
- Born: Jens Bertil Georg Nilsson; 25 September 1948 Västervik, Sweden
- Died: 13 March 2018 (aged 69) Brussels, Belgium
- Party: Swedish; Social Democratic Party; EU; Party of European Socialists
- Education: University of Uppsala

Jens Bertil Georg Nilsson (25 September 1948 – 13 March 2018) was a Swedish politician who served as a Member of the European Parliament (MEP) for Sweden from 2009 to 2018. He was a member of the Social Democrats, part of the Progressive Alliance of Socialists and Democrats.

He was elected a Member of the European Parliament (MEP) in the 2009 election, taking up his seat on 1 December 2011 on an additional seat to Sweden after the Treaty of Lisbon had entered into force. He served as member of the Committee on Transport and Tourism, Committee on Regional Development and the Delegation for relations with Belarus. In addition to his committee assignments, he served as a member of the European Parliament Intergroup on Social Economy.

Video Introduction (English) / (Swedish)

Jens Nilsson was born in Västervik and was raised in Gävle. He was trained as a youth pedagog and was Chairman of the Council of Östersund Municipality 1997-2009. He was elected chairman of the Jämtland party district of the Social Democratic Party in 2007. He died on 13 March 2018, aged 69.
