= Anders Karlsson =

Anders Karlsson may refer to:

- Anders Karlsson (politician) (born 1951), Swedish social democratic politician
- Anders Karlsson (physicist) (born 1964), scientist and professor of quantum photonics
- Anders Hans Karlsson (born 1959), Swedish scientist and agronomist
- Anders Karlsson (ice hockey) (born 1957), Swedish former ice hockey defenceman
- Anders Karlsson (footballer) (1963–2015), Swedish former footballer
- Anders Karlsson (mathematician) (born 1972), Swedish mathematician

== See also ==
- Anders Carlsson (disambiguation)
