= Hallstahammar =

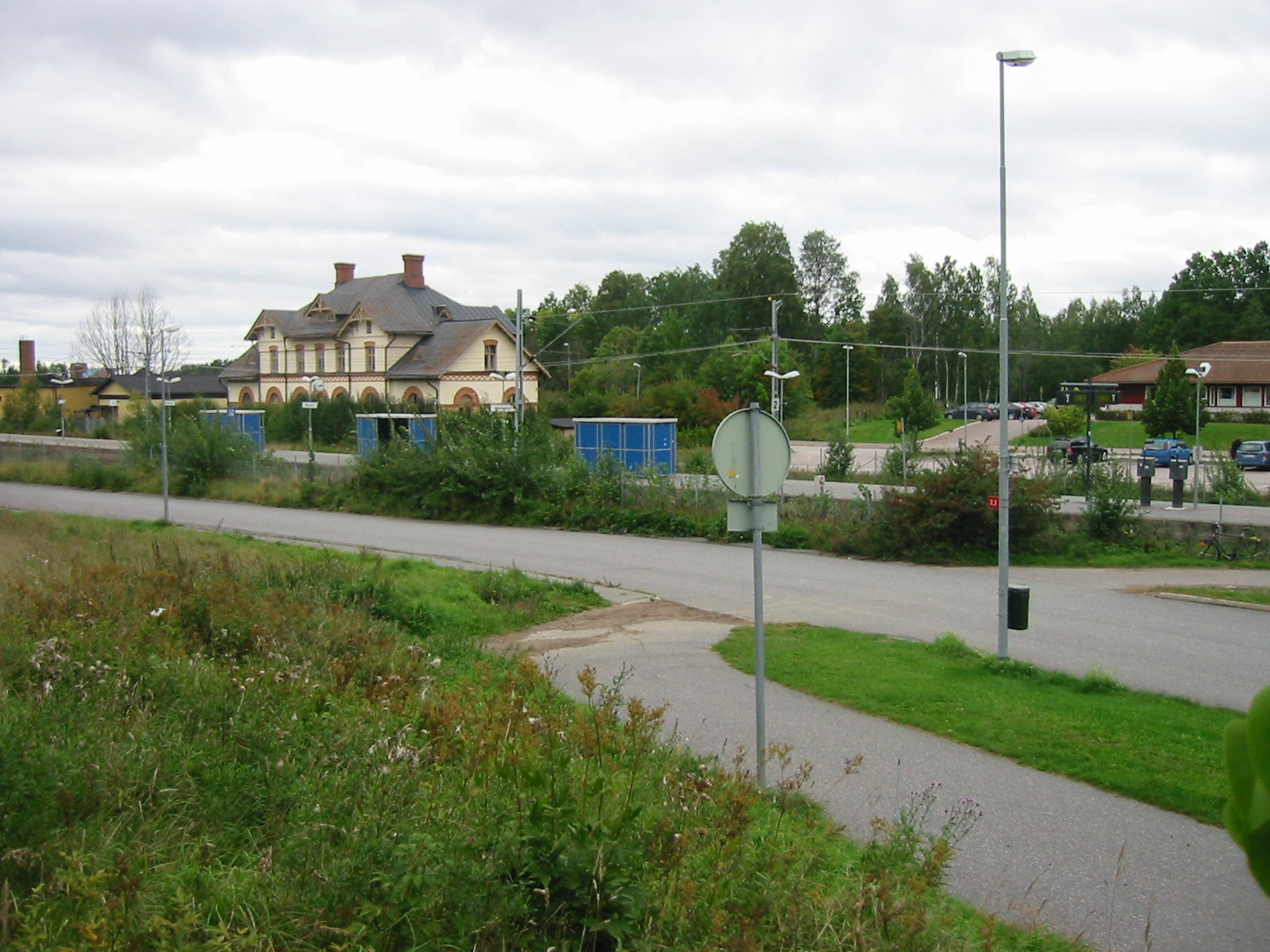
- Hallstahammar Train Station

- Location within Västmanland Location within Sweden
- Coordinates: 59°37′N 16°15′E
- Country: Sweden
- Province: Västmanland
- County: Västmanland County
- Municipality: Hallstahammar Municipality

Area
  - Total: 9.67 km^{2} (3.73 sq mi)

Population (31 December 2010)
  - Total: 15,200
  - Density: 1,084/km^{2} (2,810/sq mi)
- Time zone: UTC+1 (CET)
  - Summer (DST): UTC+2 (CEST)

Hallstahammar is a locality and the seat of Hallstahammar Municipality in Västmanland County, Sweden with 10,478 inhabitants in 2010.

== Overview ==
The King Gustaf Vasa built Strömsholm Castle along the lake about 1558. Its current appearance goes back to the 1680s. Today it hosts an interesting museum. The town is situated by the small river Kolbäcksån. Along that river many industries were established, and in 1628 the first smithy was built. In 1795 the Strömsholm Canal was inaugurated which enhanced goods transports. The town became a centre for transportation and commerce. In the 1930s it was shaped as a typical Swedish industrial town with close ties to the engineering industry. From the 1970s on, however, that industry has gradually lost its strong significance.

The Swedish soap opera Vänner och Fiender, which aired between 1996 and 2000, was recorded in the studio known as Hollyhammar.

The local bus traffic in Hallstahammar is free of charge, one of very few Swedish experiments with that type of service.

== Economy ==
Steel production company Ovako has a production site in Hallstahammar.

== Notable residents ==
- Anders Hans Karlsson, scientist and agronomist
- Thore Skogman, singer, actor and entertainer
- Hans von Kantzow, engineer
- Sofi Flinck, track and field athlete
- Emma Strandberg, beauty queen, model
