= Sörstafors =

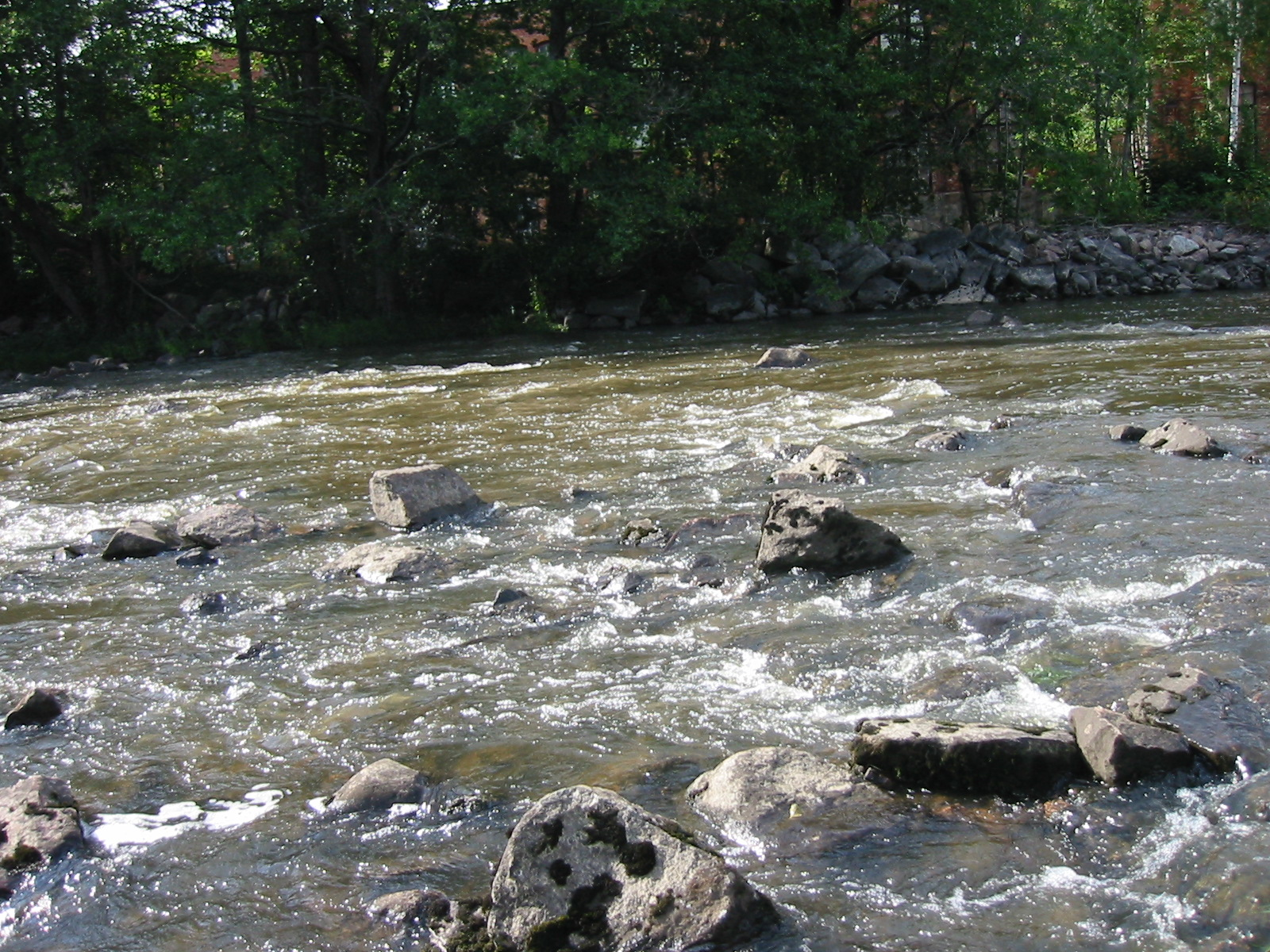
- The rapids in Sörstafors

- Location within Västmanland Location within Sweden
- Coordinates: 59°35′N 16°13′E
- Country: Sweden
- Province: Västmanland
- County: Västmanland County
- Municipality: Hallstahammar Municipality

Area
  - Total: 0.43 km^{2} (0.17 sq mi)

Population (31 December 2010)
  - Total: 278
  - Density: 646/km^{2} (1,670/sq mi)
- Time zone: UTC+1 (CET)
  - Summer (DST): UTC+2 (CEST)

Sörstafors is a locality situated in Hallstahammar Municipality, Västmanland County, Sweden with 278 inhabitants in 2010.
