= Arboga =

Locality in Sweden

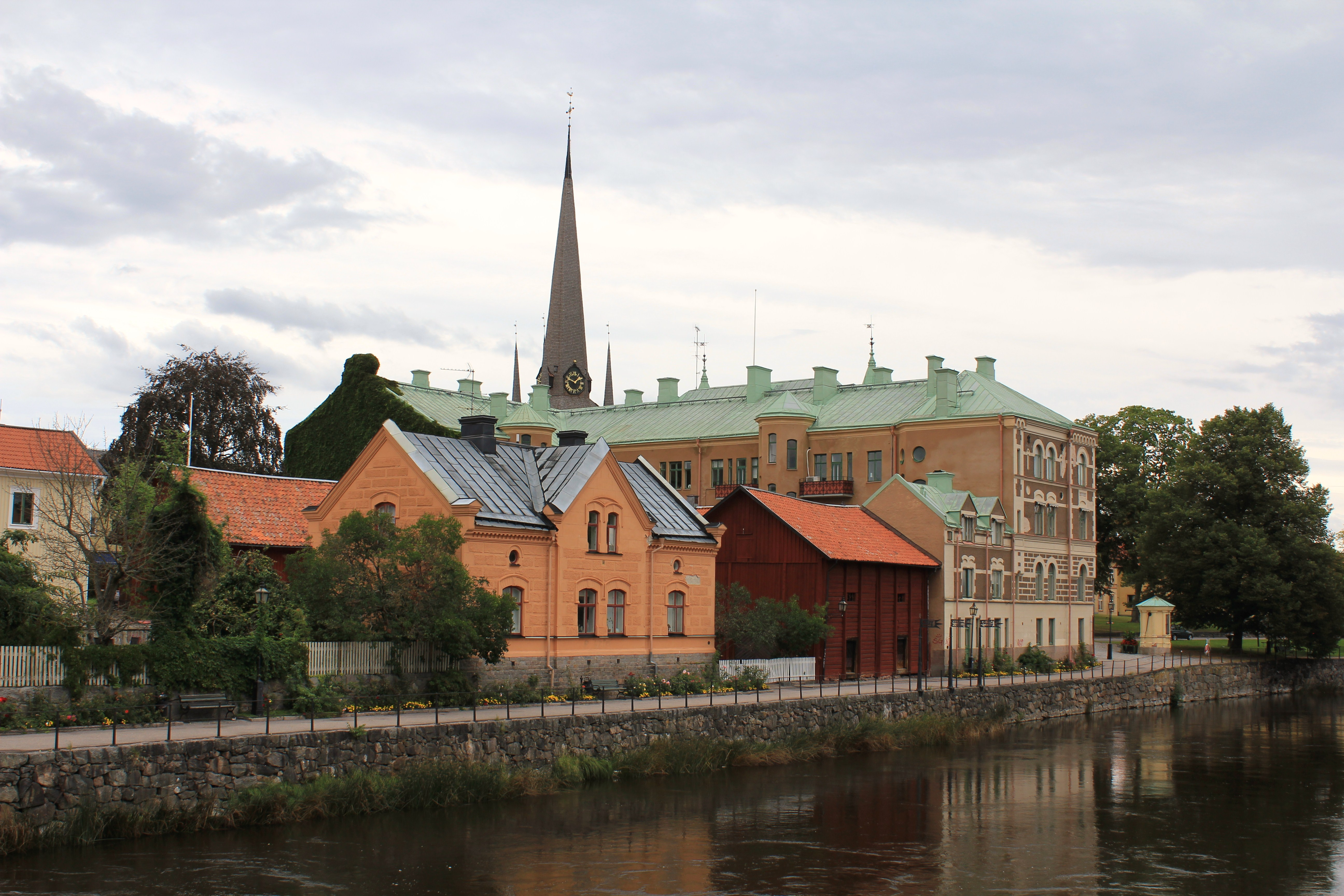
- Central Arboga

- Coat of arms

- Location within Västmanland Location within Sweden
- Coordinates: 59°23′38″N 15°50′19″E
- Country: Sweden
- Province: Västmanland
- County: Västmanland County
- Municipality: Arboga Municipality
- Established: 1200

Area
  - City: 799 km^{2} (308 sq mi)
- Elevation: 20 m (66 ft)

Population (31 December 2020 / 31 March 2023)
  - City: 10,989
  - Density: 1,375/km^{2} (3,560/sq mi)
  - Urban: 14,057
- Time zone: UTC+1 (CET)
  - Summer (DST): UTC+2 (CEST)
- Postal code: 732 xx
- Area code: (+46) 589
- Website: Official website

Arboga (Swedish pronunciation: [ˈârːˌboːɡa]) is a locality and the seat of Arboga Municipality in Västmanland County, Sweden with 10,989 inhabitants in 2020.

== Overview ==
The city of Arboga is known to have existed as a town since the 13th century but the area has been inhabited since around 900 AD. The name (originally Arbugæ) consists of the two words "Ar" which in ancient Swedish means river and bughi which means "bend" and which together have the meaning "river bend".

The city was at one time a residence of the royal family of Vasa. It was the scene of church assemblies and national diets, and it is known for the antiquities in its neighborhood. The first session of the Riksdag of the Estates was held in Arboga in 1435. Albertus Pictor, the most famous Swedish artist of the late medieval period, was admitted burgher of the town in 1465.

Today the city is an important traffic link since the highways E18 and E20 merge there. Two railways Mälarbanan and Svealandsbanan, between Stockholm and Hallsberg also merge in Arboga. The city has a population of about 14,057 (2023).

== Sports ==
The following sports clubs are in Arboga:

- Arboga Södra IF
- IFK Arboga IK
- Arboga Stad SK

In addition the Sixth Women's World Gliding Championships was held 15–25 June 2011.

Alexander Gustafsson, mixed martial artist, was born in Arboga.
