= Medåker =

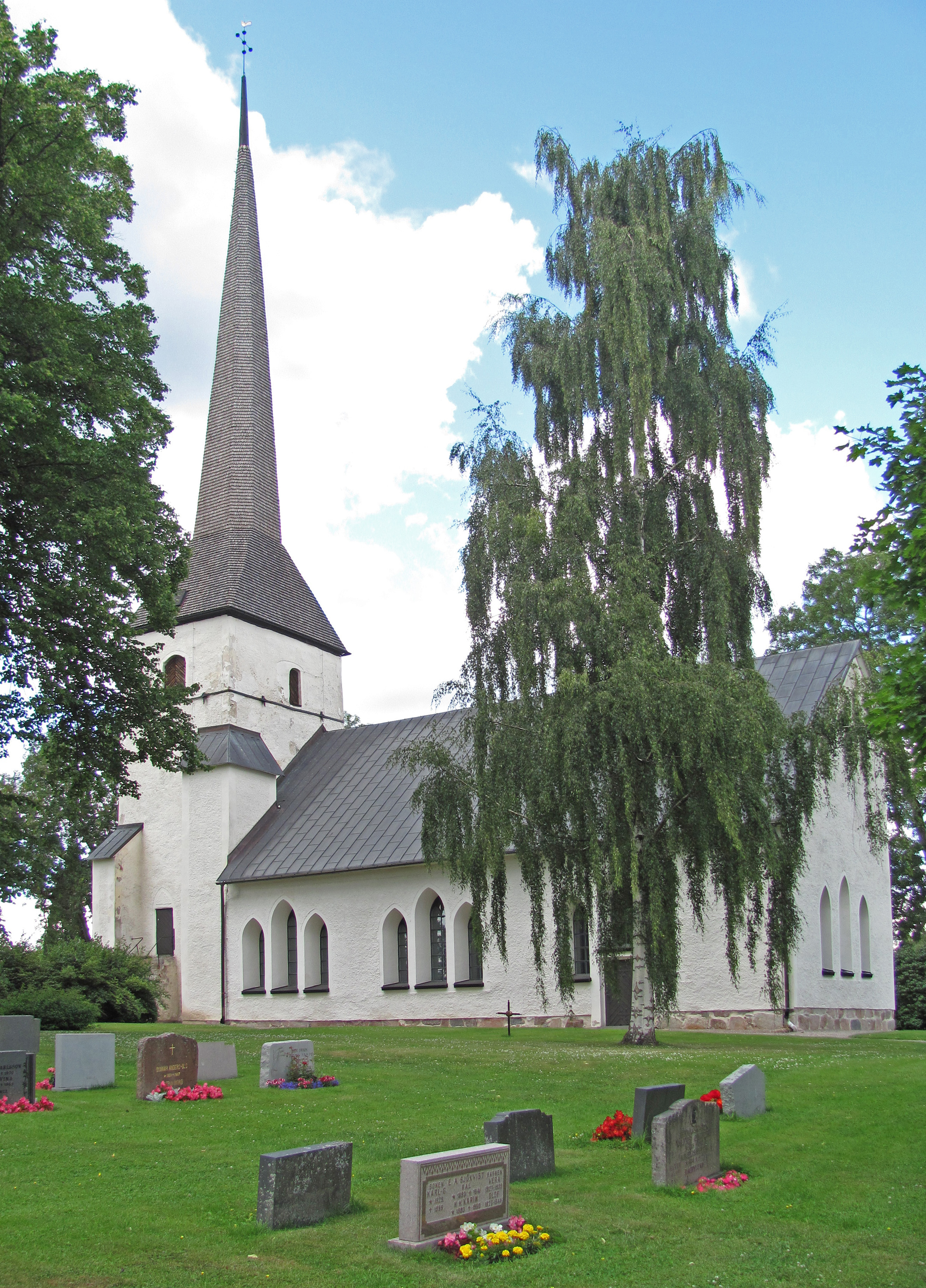
- Medåker Church

- Location within Västmanland Location within Sweden
- Coordinates: 59°27′N 15°45′E
- Country: Sweden
- Province: Västmanland
- County: Västmanland County
- Municipality: Arboga Municipality

Area
  - Total: 0.52 km^{2} (0.20 sq mi)

Population (31 December 2010)
  - Total: 224
  - Density: 430/km^{2} (1,100/sq mi)
- Time zone: UTC+1 (CET)
  - Summer (DST): UTC+2 (CEST)

Medåker is a locality situated in Arboga Municipality, Västmanland County, Sweden with 224 inhabitants in 2010.
