= Kärsta och Bredsdal =

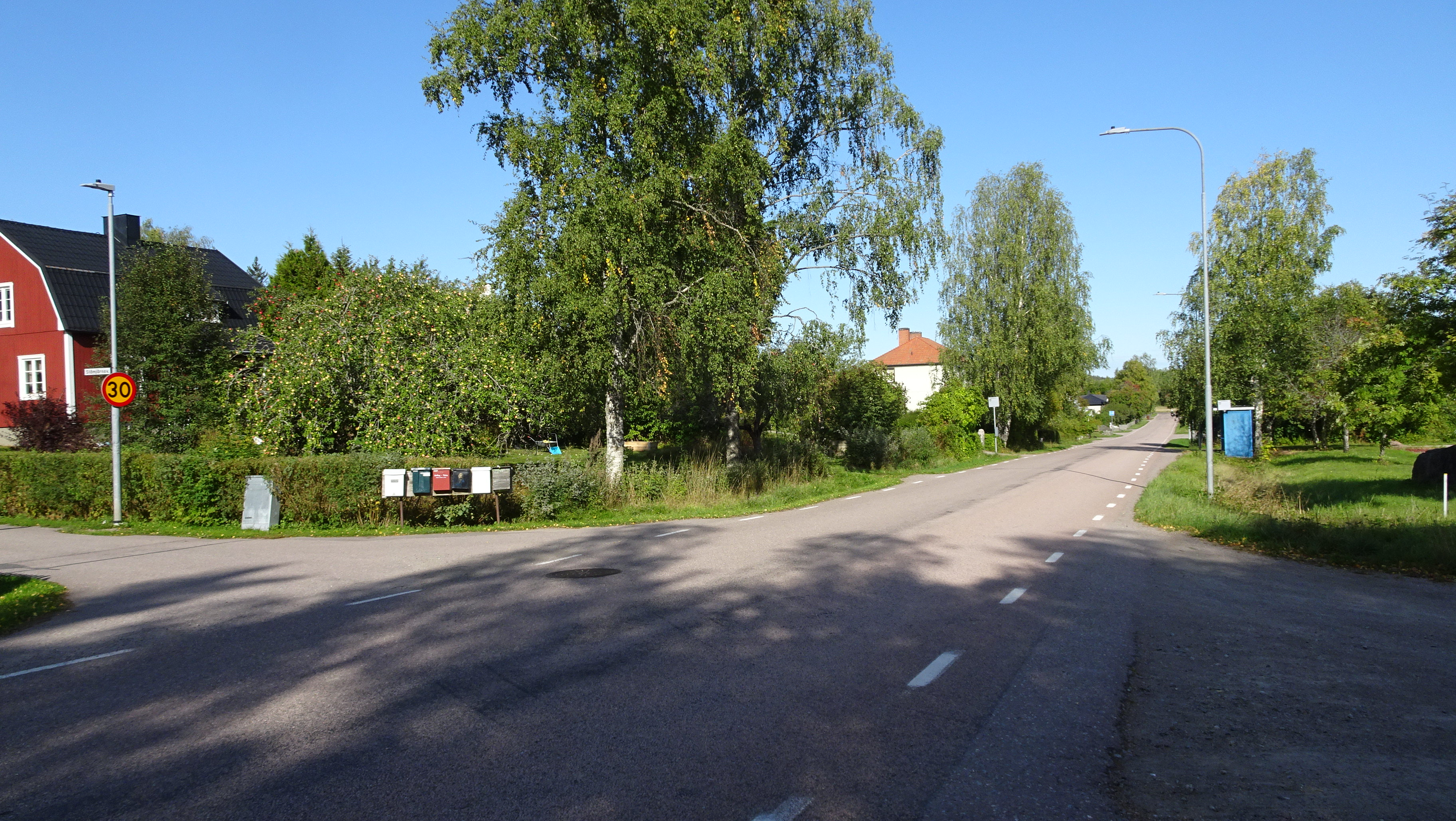
- Kärsta.jpg

- Location within Västmanland Location within Uppsala Location within Sweden
- Coordinates: 59°40′N 16°50′E
- Country: Sweden
- Province: Västmanland and Uppland
- County: Västmanland County and Uppsala County
- Municipality: Västerås Municipality and Enköping Municipality

Area
  - Total: 0.27 km^{2} (0.10 sq mi)

Population (31 December 2010)
  - Total: 261
  - Density: 958/km^{2} (2,480/sq mi)
- Time zone: UTC+1 (CET)
  - Summer (DST): UTC+2 (CEST)

Kärsta och Bredsdal is a bimunicipal locality situated in Västerås Municipality, Västmanland County and Enköping Municipality, Uppsala County in Sweden with 261 inhabitants in 2010.
