= Örtagården =

- Location within Västmanland Location within Sweden
- Coordinates: 59°33′45″N 16°28′35″E
- Country: Sweden
- Province: Västmanland
- County: Västmanland County
- Municipality: Västerås Municipality

Area
  - Total: 0.35 km^{2} (0.14 sq mi)

Population (31 December 2010)
  - Total: 460
  - Density: 1,325/km^{2} (3,430/sq mi)
- Time zone: UTC+1 (CET)
  - Summer (DST): UTC+2 (CEST)

Örtagården is a locality situated in Västerås Municipality, Västmanland County, Sweden with 460 inhabitants in 2010.
