= Tidö =

Tidö may refer to:

- Tidö Agreement. Swedish political 2022 agreement
- Tidö Castle, Swedish castle
- Tidö-Lindö, Swedish locality

== See also ==
- Bizzey, artist of album "Tido"
