= Tortuna =

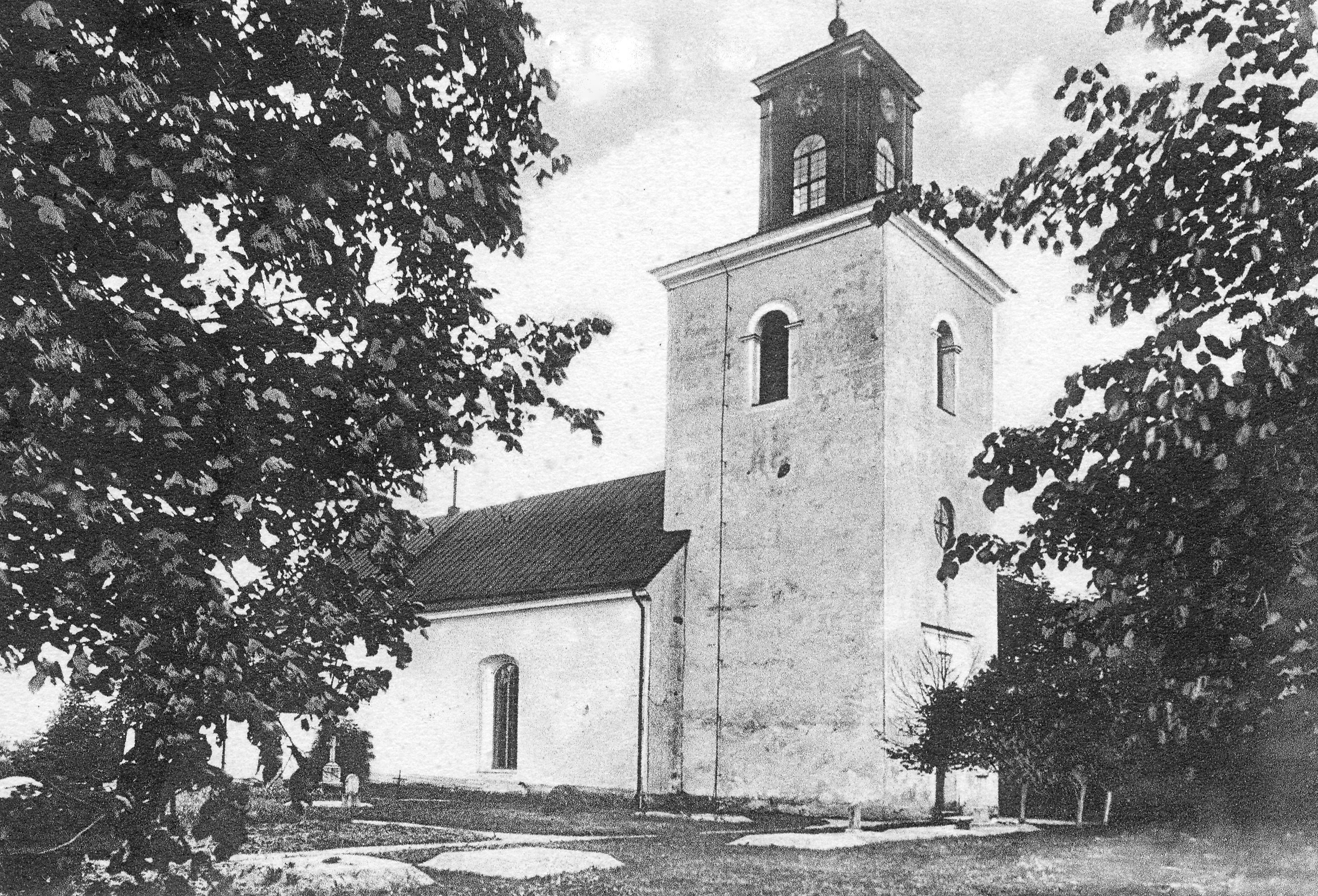
- Tortuna Church

- Location within Västmanland Location within Sweden
- Coordinates: 59°40′40″N 16°43′00″E
- Country: Sweden
- Province: Västmanland
- County: Västmanland County
- Municipality: Västerås Municipality

Area
  - Total: 0.62 km^{2} (0.24 sq mi)

Population (31 December 2010)
  - Total: 459
  - Density: 738/km^{2} (1,910/sq mi)
- Time zone: UTC+1 (CET)
  - Summer (DST): UTC+2 (CEST)

Tortuna (Swedish pronunciation: [ˈtɔ̂rːˌtʉːna]) is a locality situated in Västerås Municipality, Västmanland County, Sweden with 459 inhabitants in 2010.
