= JamaicansMusic.com =

JamaicansMusic.com is a website that catalogues and markets Jamaican music history, artists and culture. Its Facebook fan page has the largest number of fans of any company based in the Caribbean, having surpassed Digicel (Jamaica) in February 2011.

== Virtual Disc Jockey ==
On July 3, 2010, Alex Morrissey, the then 21-year-old CEO of the website, announced the launch of the world's first virtual turntables with Virtual Disc Jockey. Users could then log onto the site and create their own music mixes without the need to download any software. There were over 5,000 songs available to be mixed on the day of the launch.

== Songwrita ==
On December 14, 2010, Morrissey announced another JamaicansMusic.com creation called Songwrita, a game that allows players to select their favourite Jamaican artist and then use that artist's animated image to catch the lyrics to one of his or her popular singles as they fall from above. Points are accumulated as lyrics and other special items (such as mics and food) are caught. Points are deducted when bottles hit the artist. If no lyrics are caught for a while, then the audio begins to skip. Therefore, to keep the song playing smoothly, the player must continuously catch the falling words. Songwrita features Vybz Kartel, Mavado, Beenie Man, Bounty Killer, Gyptian, Wayne Marshall, Lady Saw, Munga, Protoje, Aidonia and other artists. The game was made available only on Facebook.
