= Parish granary =

Communal granaries in Sweden and Finland

Parish granaries (Swedish: sockenmagasin, Finnish: pitäjänmakasiini) were communal granaries established in Sweden and Finland during the 18th and 19th century. They were built for storing grains in case of poor harvest or crop failure. Farmers could borrow seeds at low rates of interest and the possible profit was used for the poor.

First parish granaries were constructed early 18th century. In 1756 the Swedish Riksdag enacted a law for establishing a granary in every parish. They were usually built of stone and often located by the churchyard. The wooden granaries had double walls for preventing theft. Many preserved ones serve today as museums, art galleries or summer cafés.

== Gallery ==
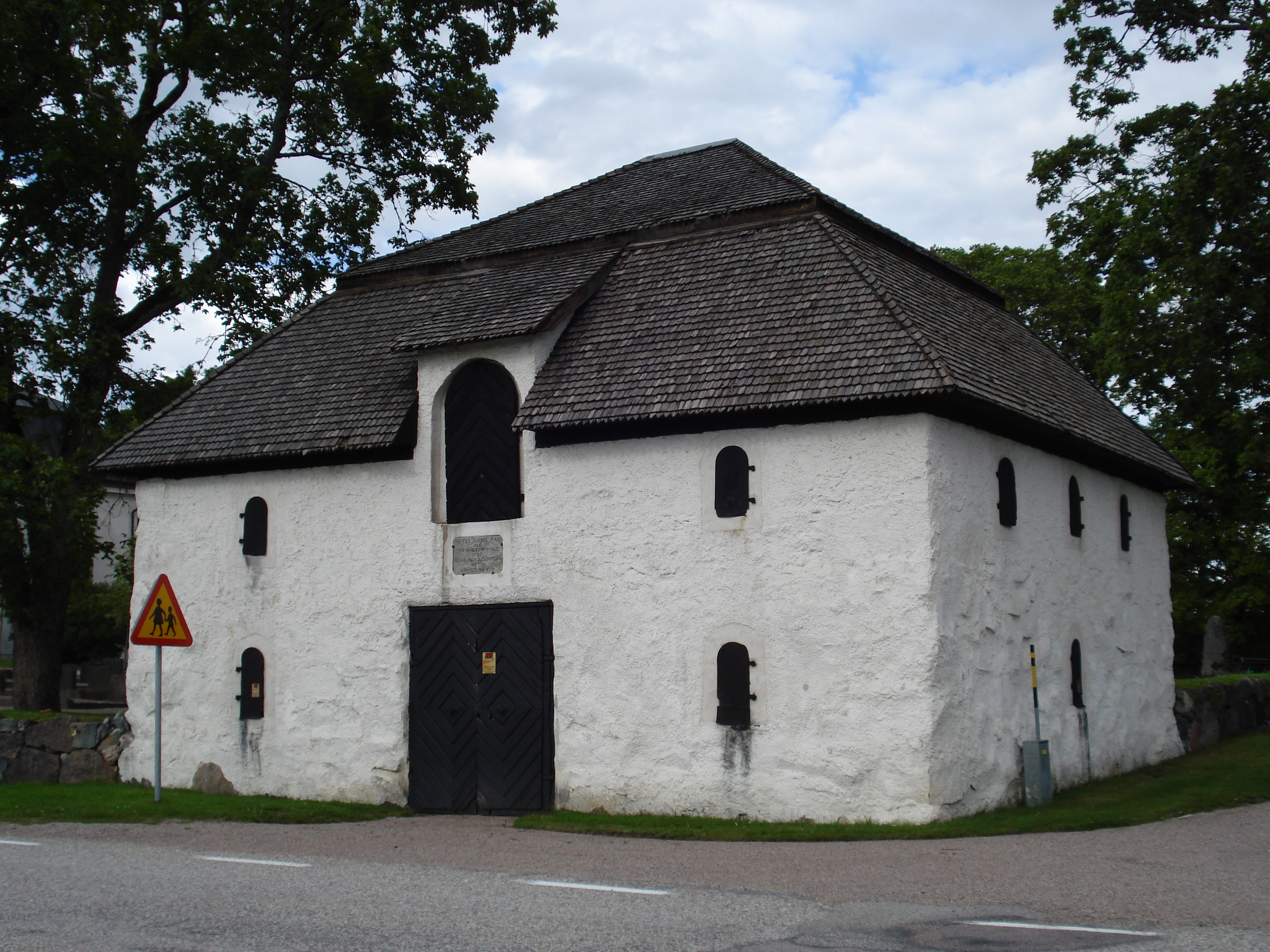
Götlunda, Sweden

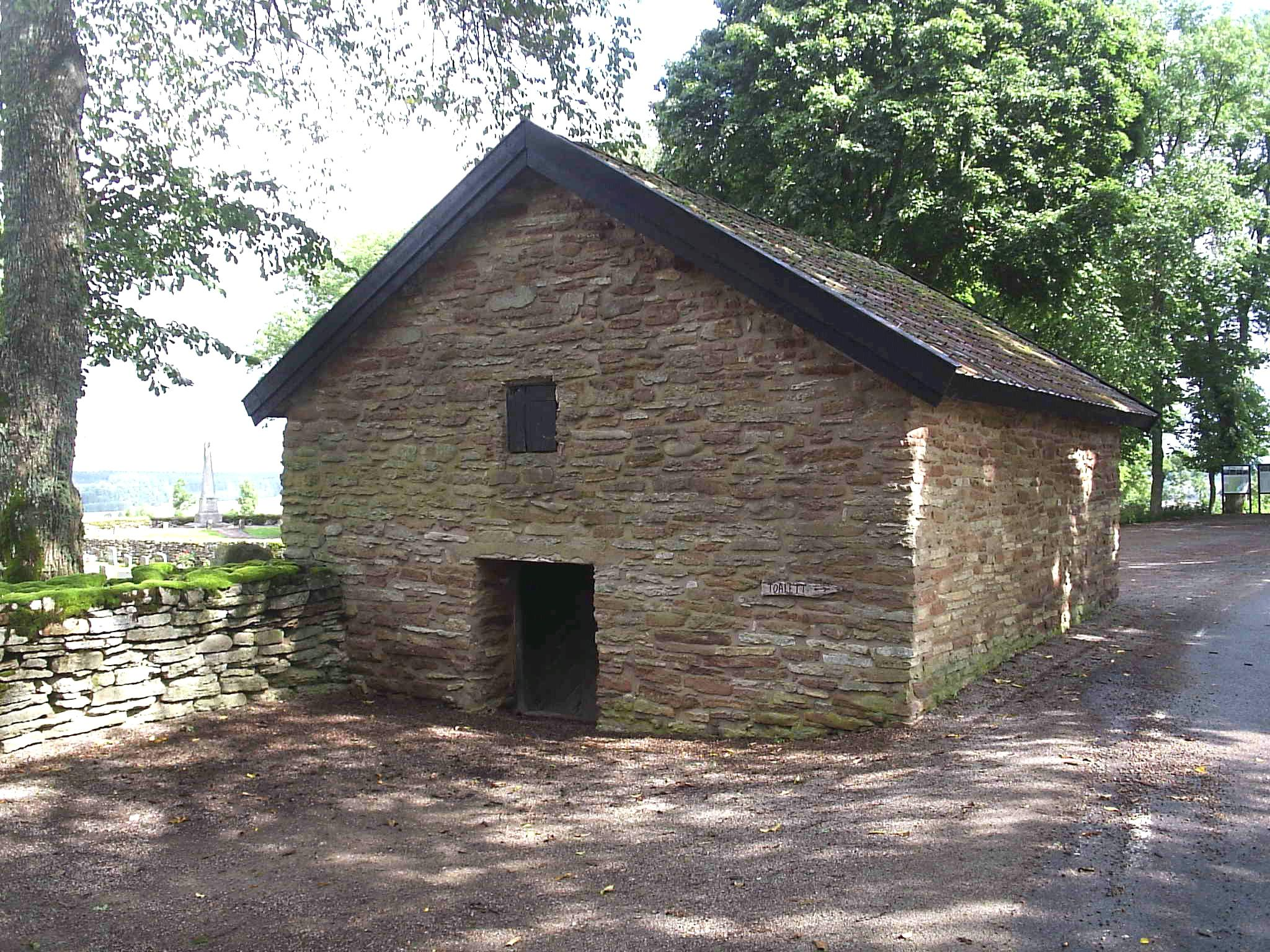
Kungslena, Sweden

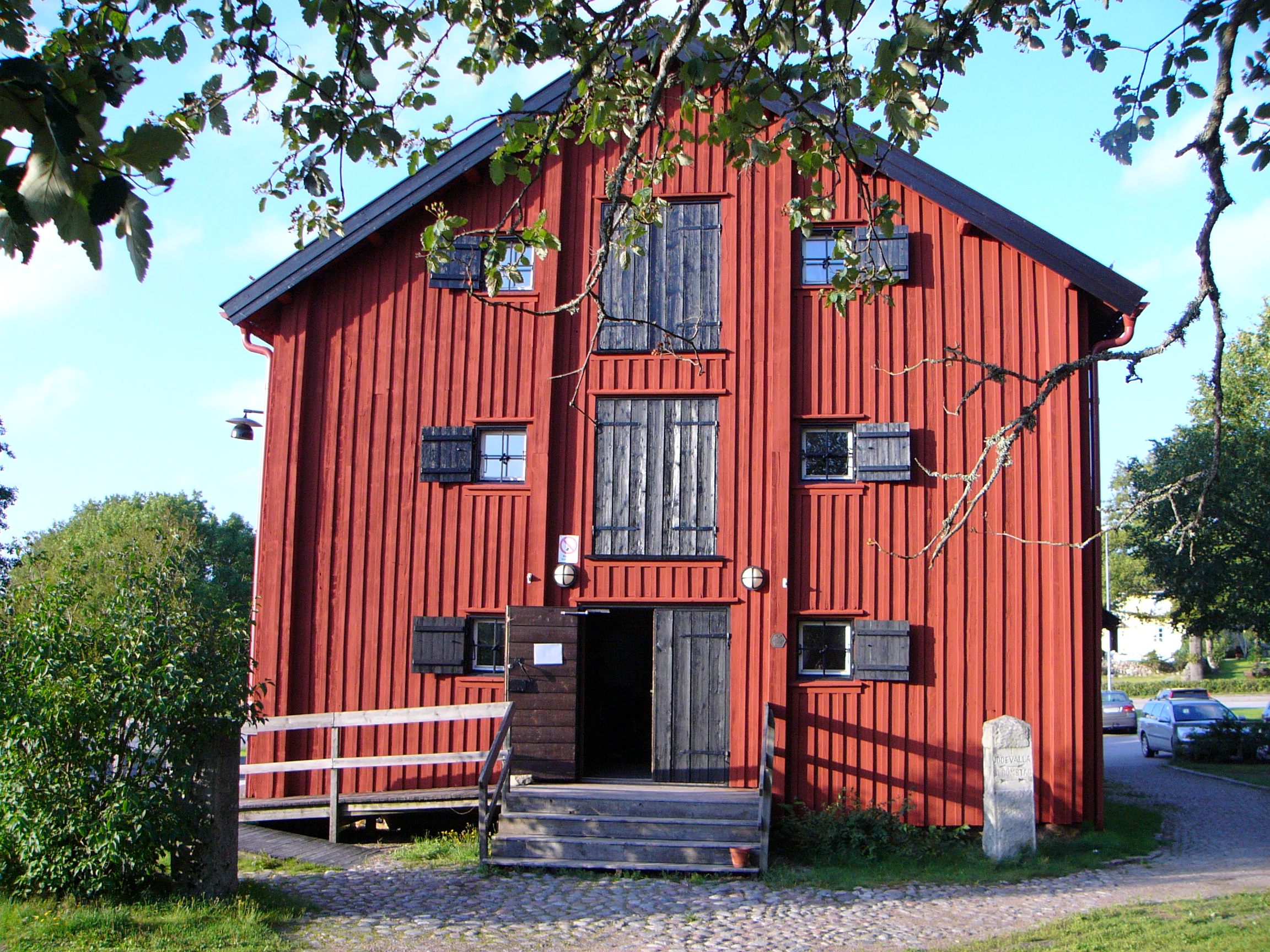
Tanumshede, Sweden

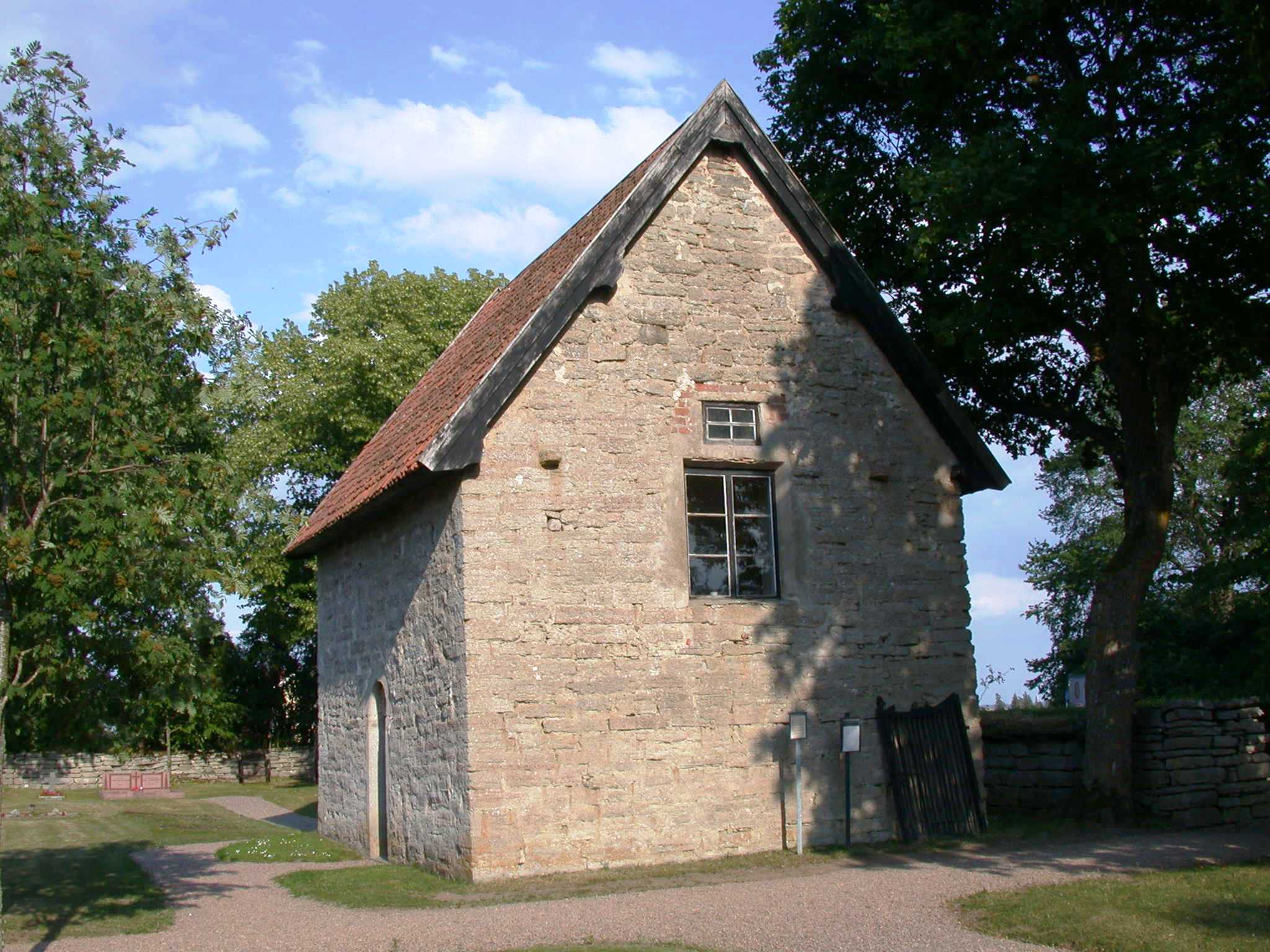
Vadstena, Sweden

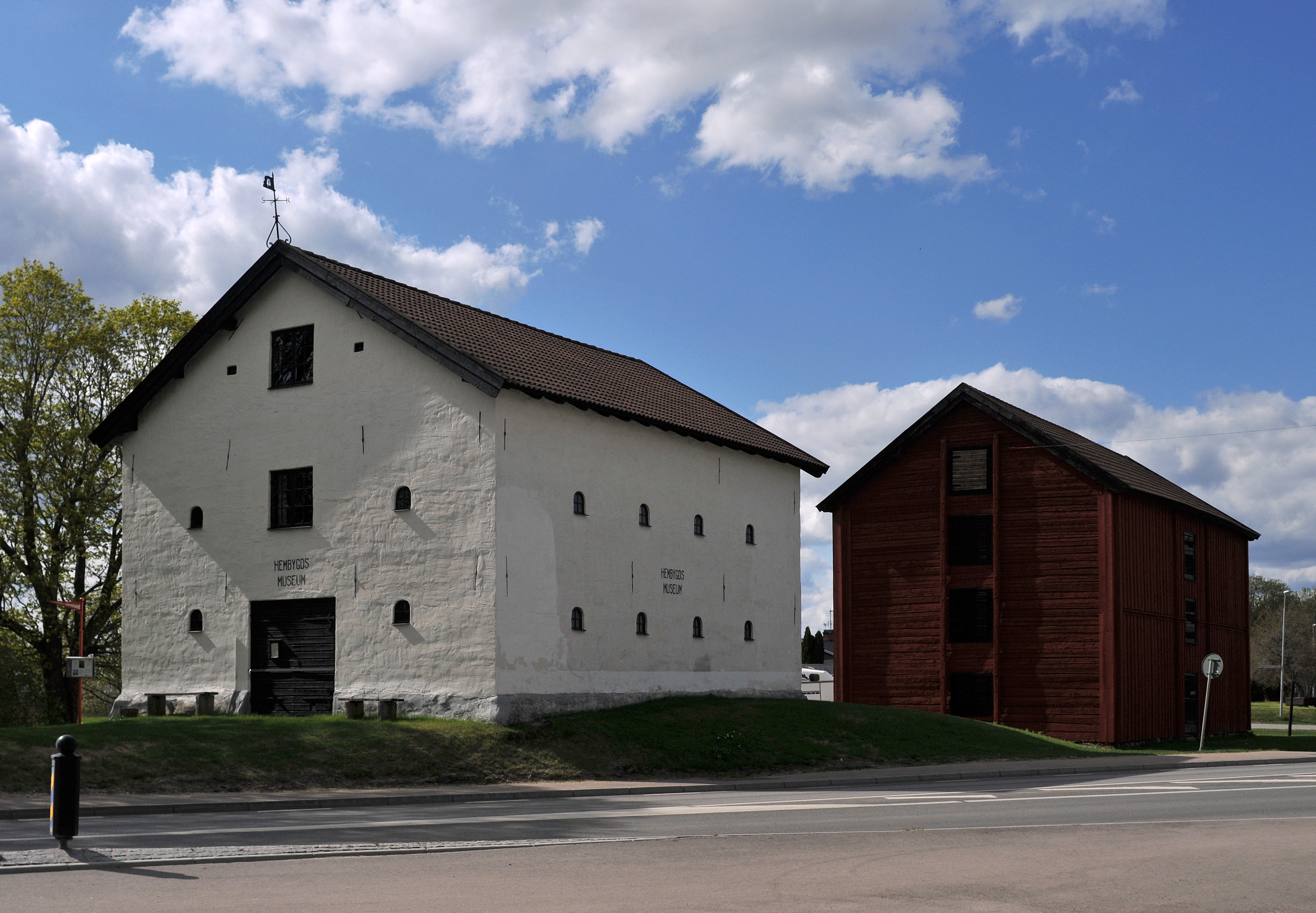
Vingåker, Sweden

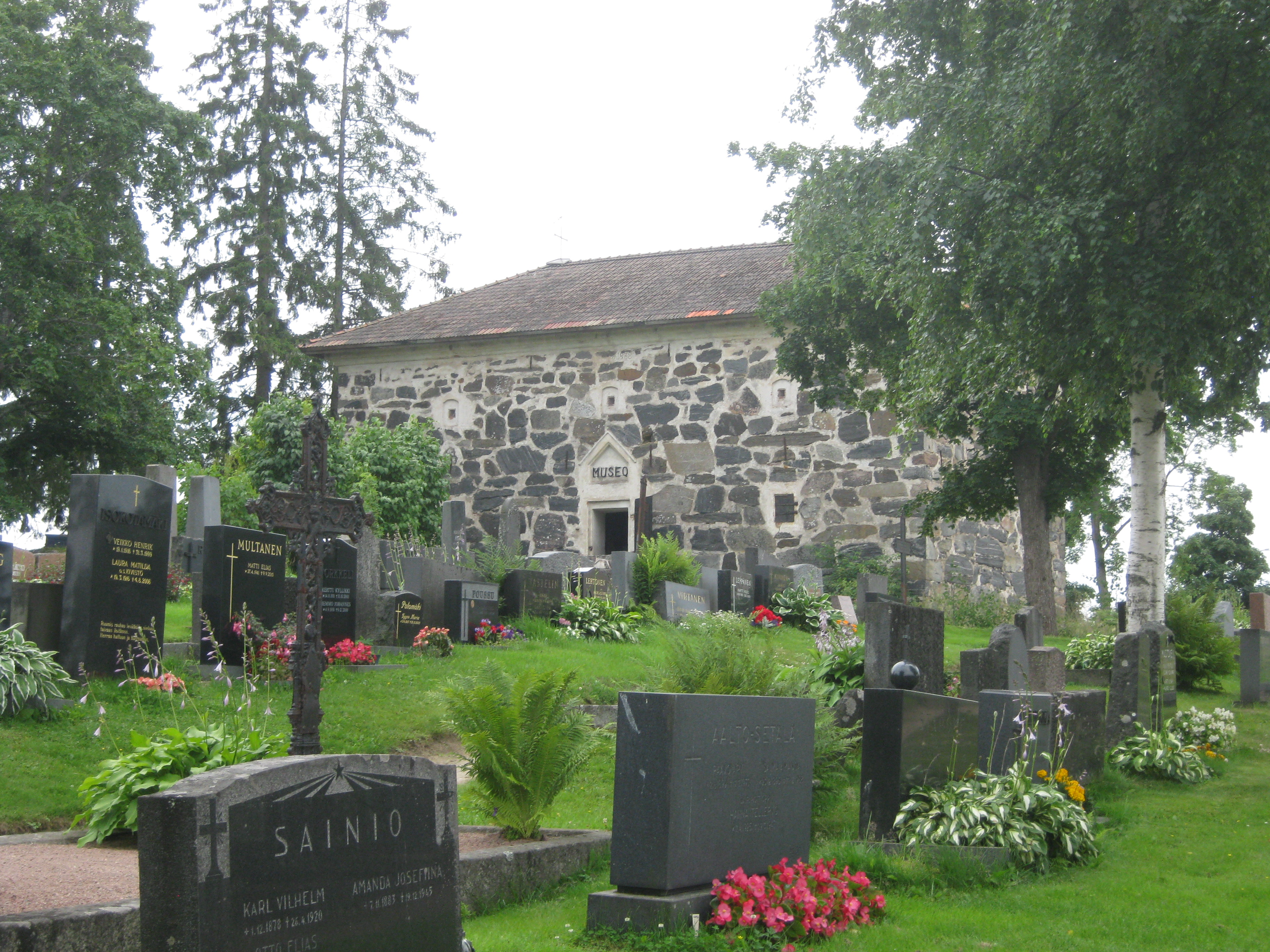
Kokemäki, Finland

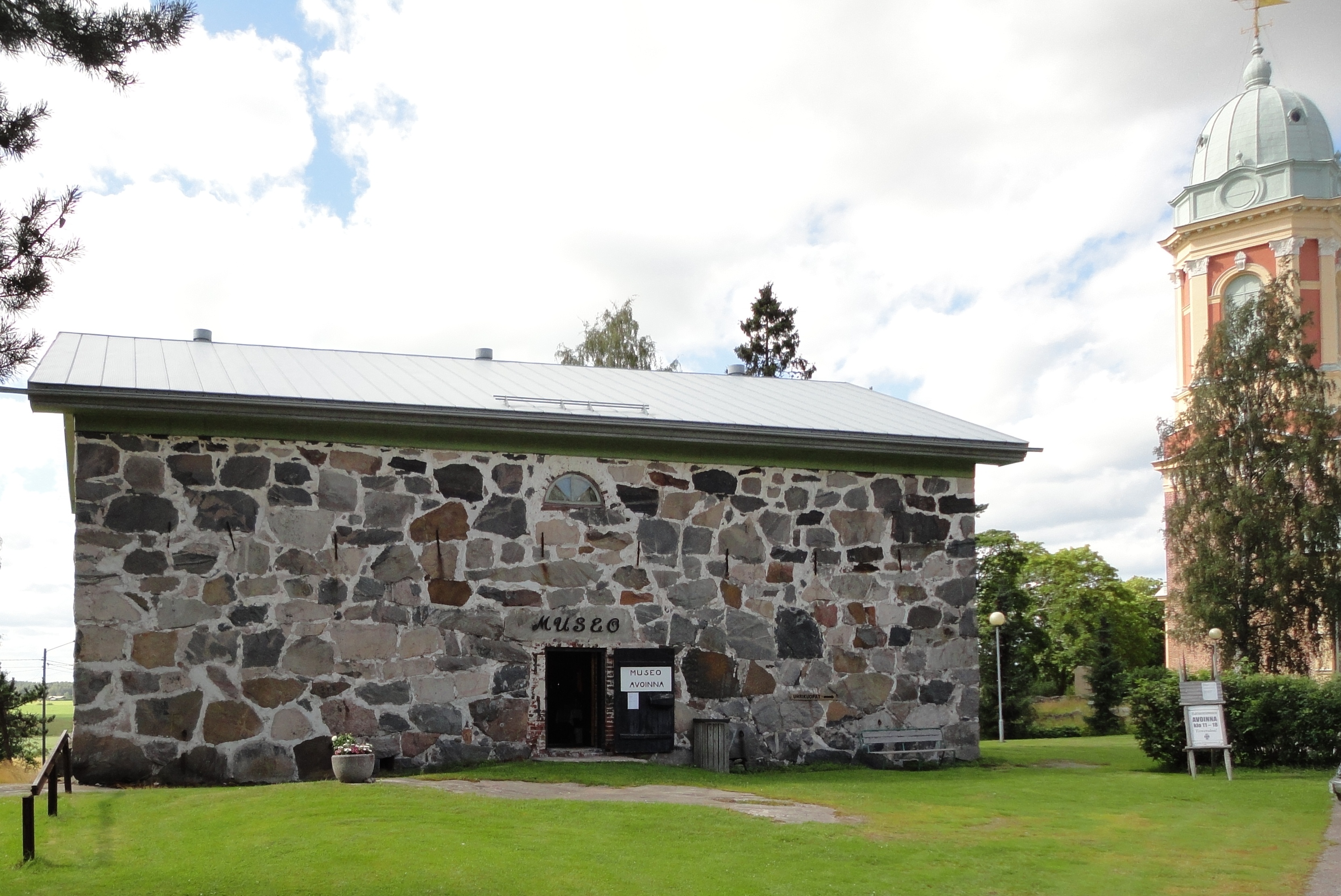
Loimaa, Finland

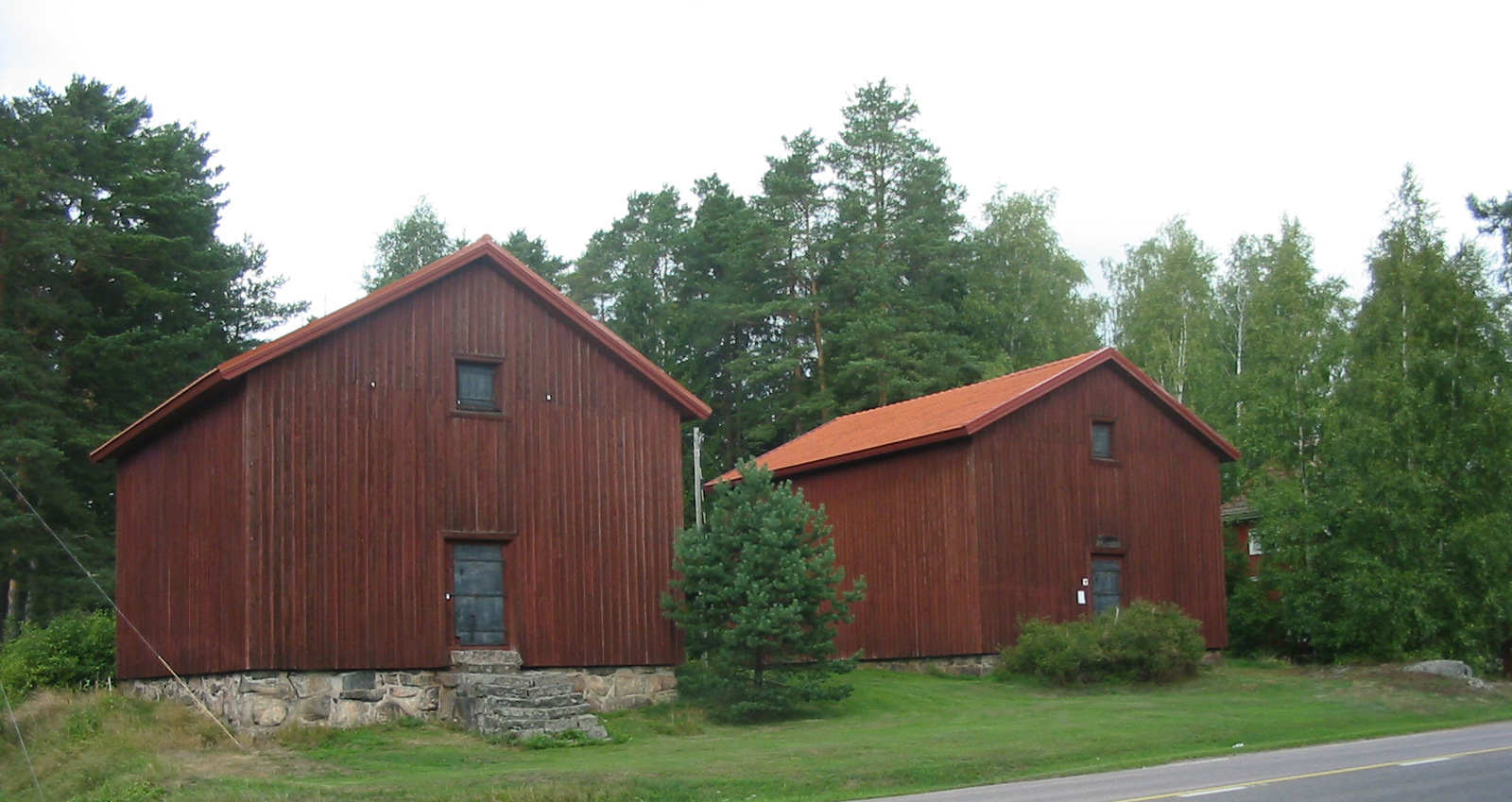
Marttila, Finland

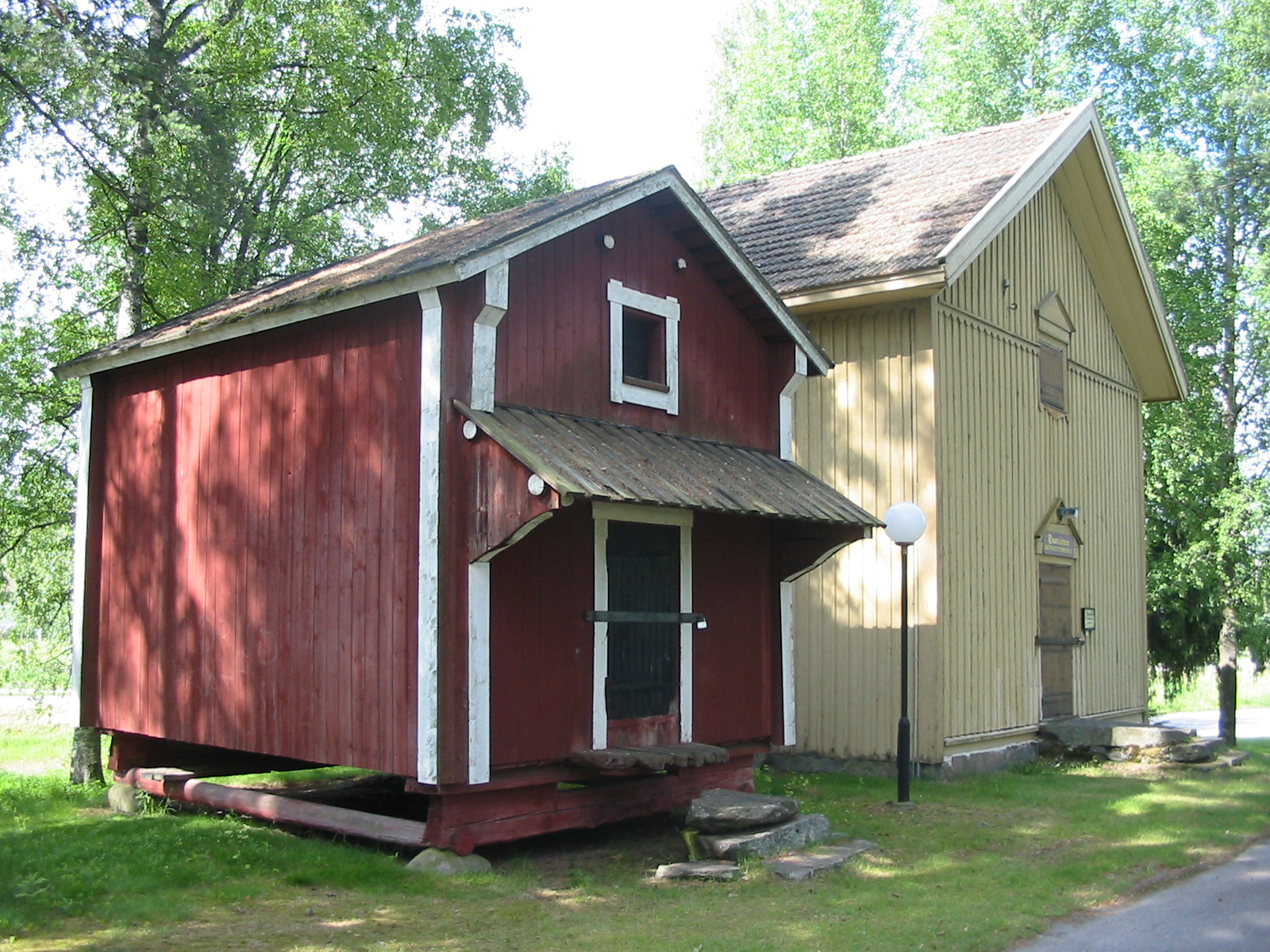
Paattinen, Finland

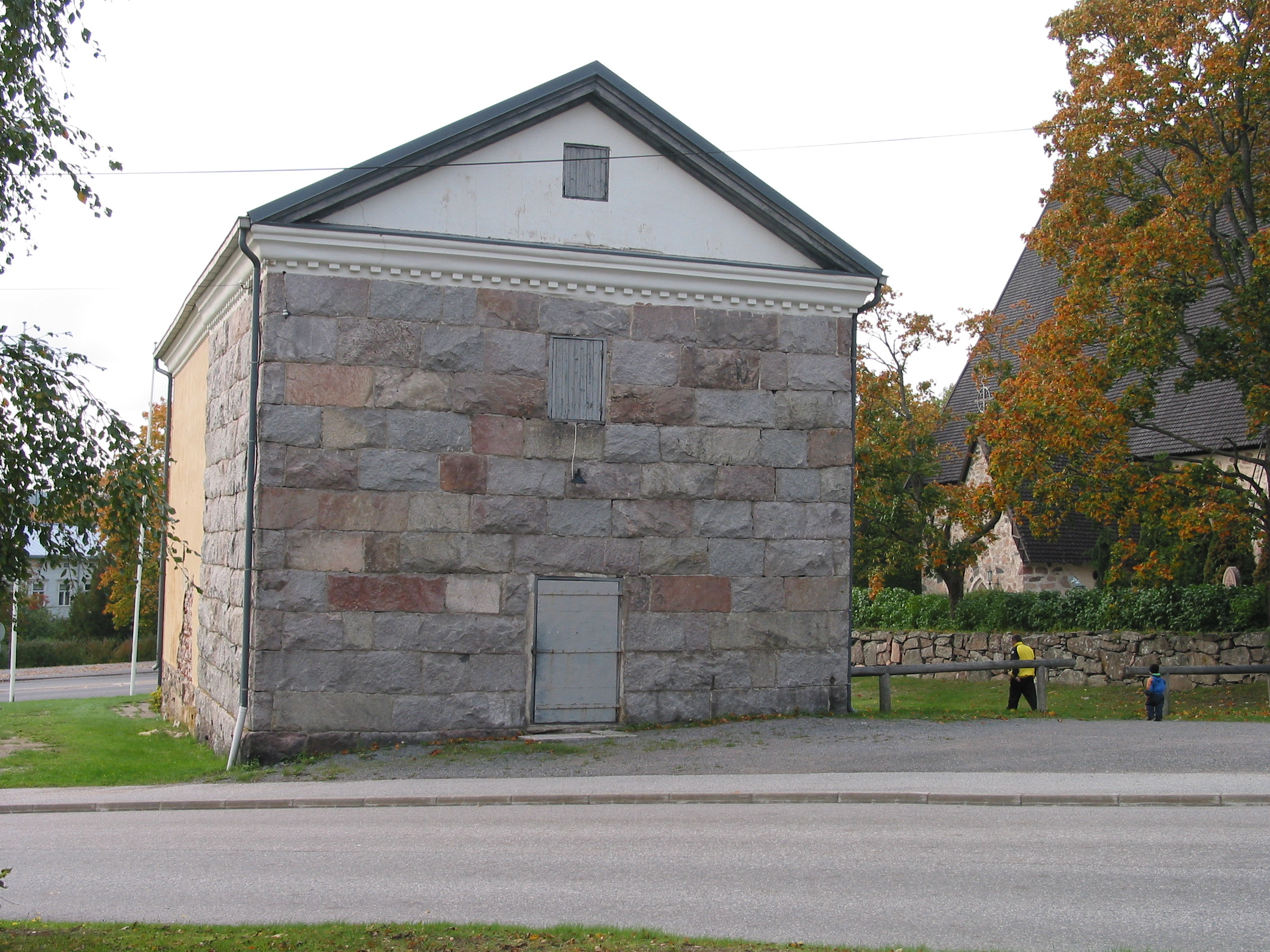
Perniö, Finland
