= Enhagen-Ekbacken =

- Location within Västmanland Location within Sweden
- Coordinates: 59°34′N 16°32′E
- Country: Sweden
- Province: Västmanland
- County: Västmanland County
- Municipality: Västerås Municipality

Area
  - Total: 0.71 km^{2} (0.27 sq mi)

Population (31 December 2010)
  - Total: 1,012
  - Density: 1,431/km^{2} (3,710/sq mi)
- Time zone: UTC+1 (CET)
  - Summer (DST): UTC+2 (CEST)

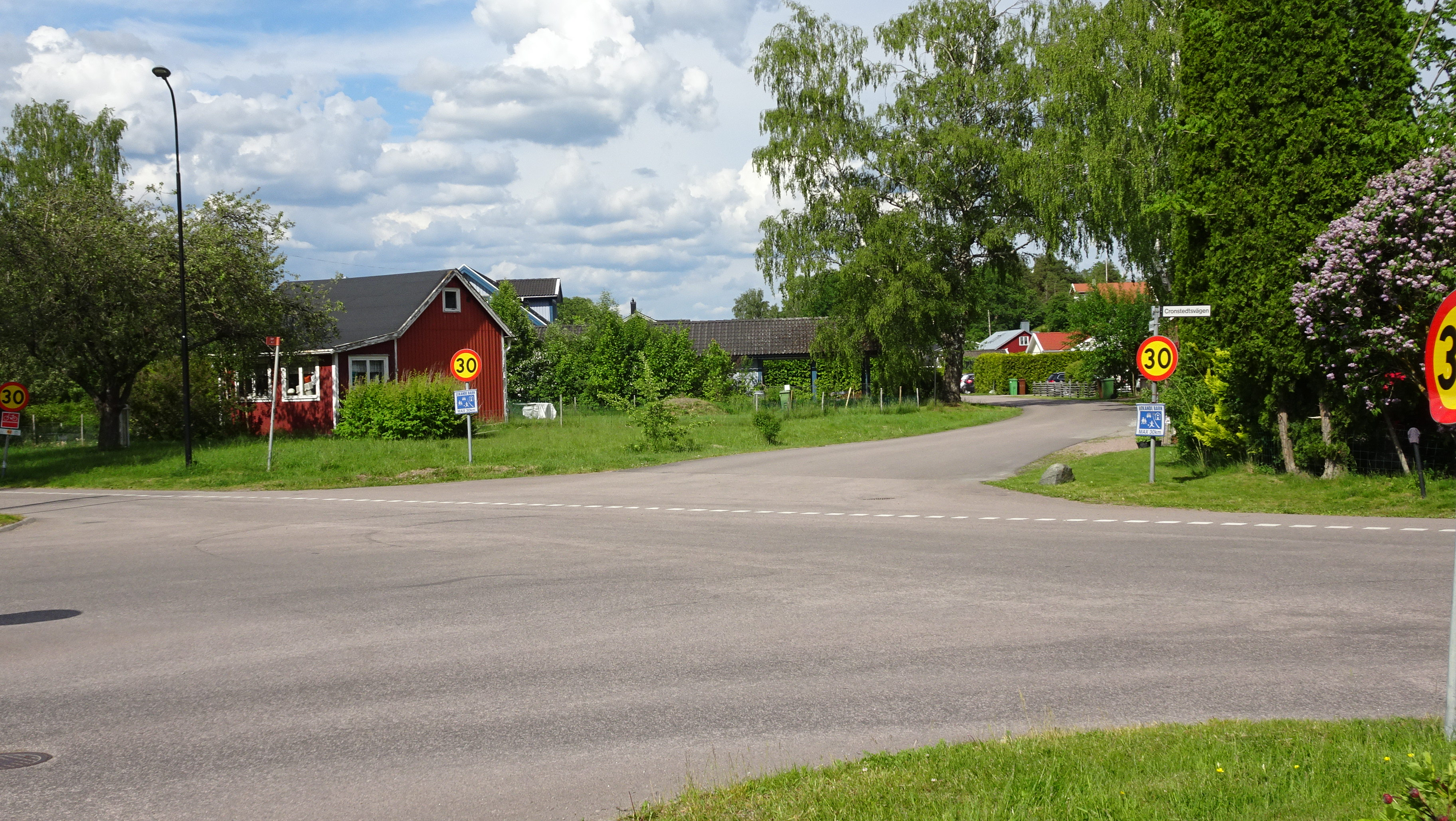

Enhagen-Ekbacken is a locality situated in Västerås Municipality, Västmanland County, Sweden with 1,012 inhabitants in 2010.
