= Götlunda =

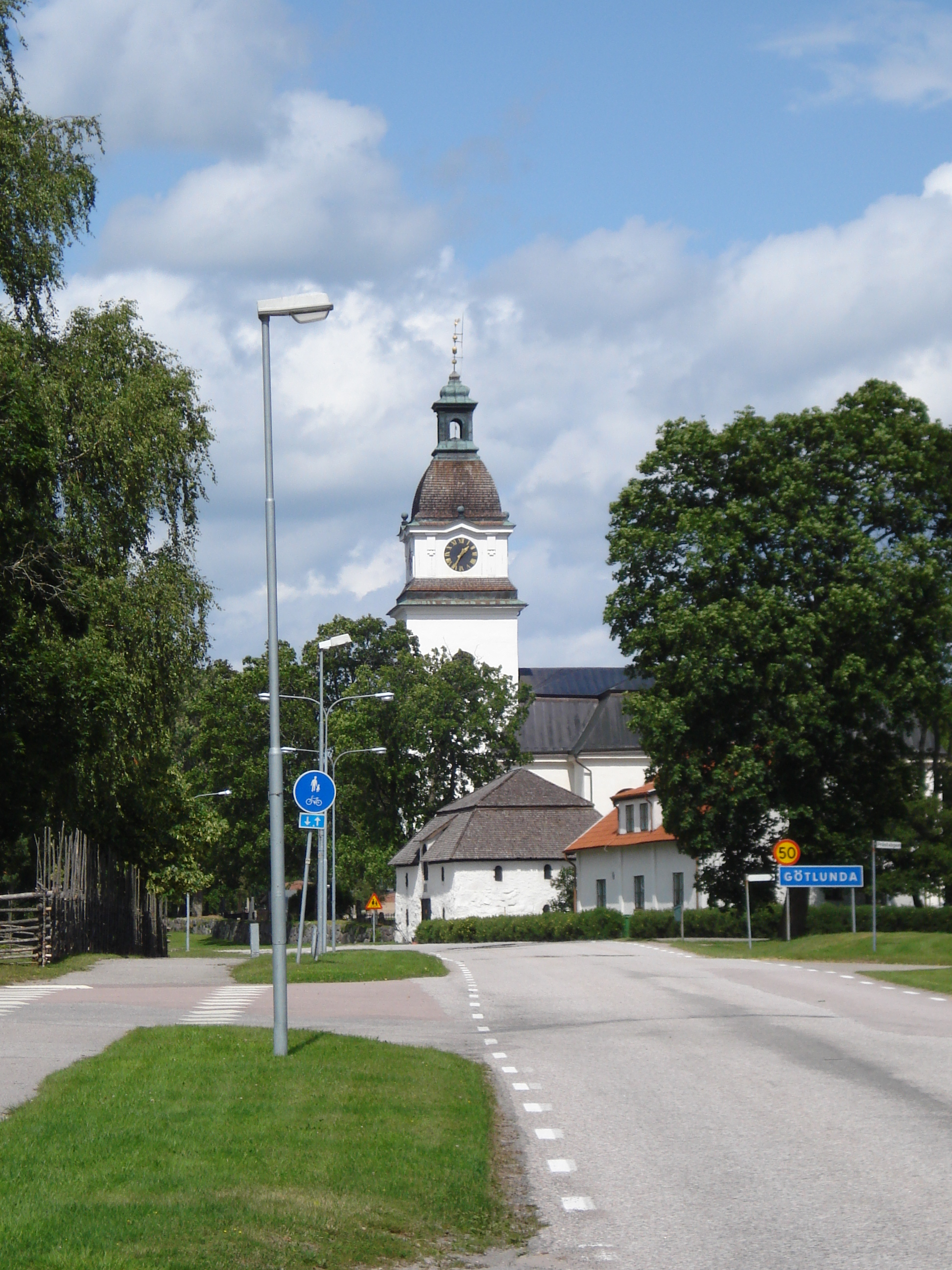
- Götlunda in July 2009

- Location within Västmanland Location within Sweden
- Coordinates: 59°21′N 15°40′E
- Country: Sweden
- Province: Närke
- County: Västmanland County
- Municipality: Arboga Municipality

Area
  - Total: 0.36 km^{2} (0.14 sq mi)

Population (31 December 2010)
  - Total: 270
  - Density: 760/km^{2} (2,000/sq mi)
- Time zone: UTC+1 (CET)
  - Summer (DST): UTC+2 (CEST)

Götlunda is a locality situated in Arboga Municipality, Västmanland County, Sweden with 270 inhabitants in 2010.
