= Västerås Municipality =

Västerås Municipality Västerås kommun
- Municipality
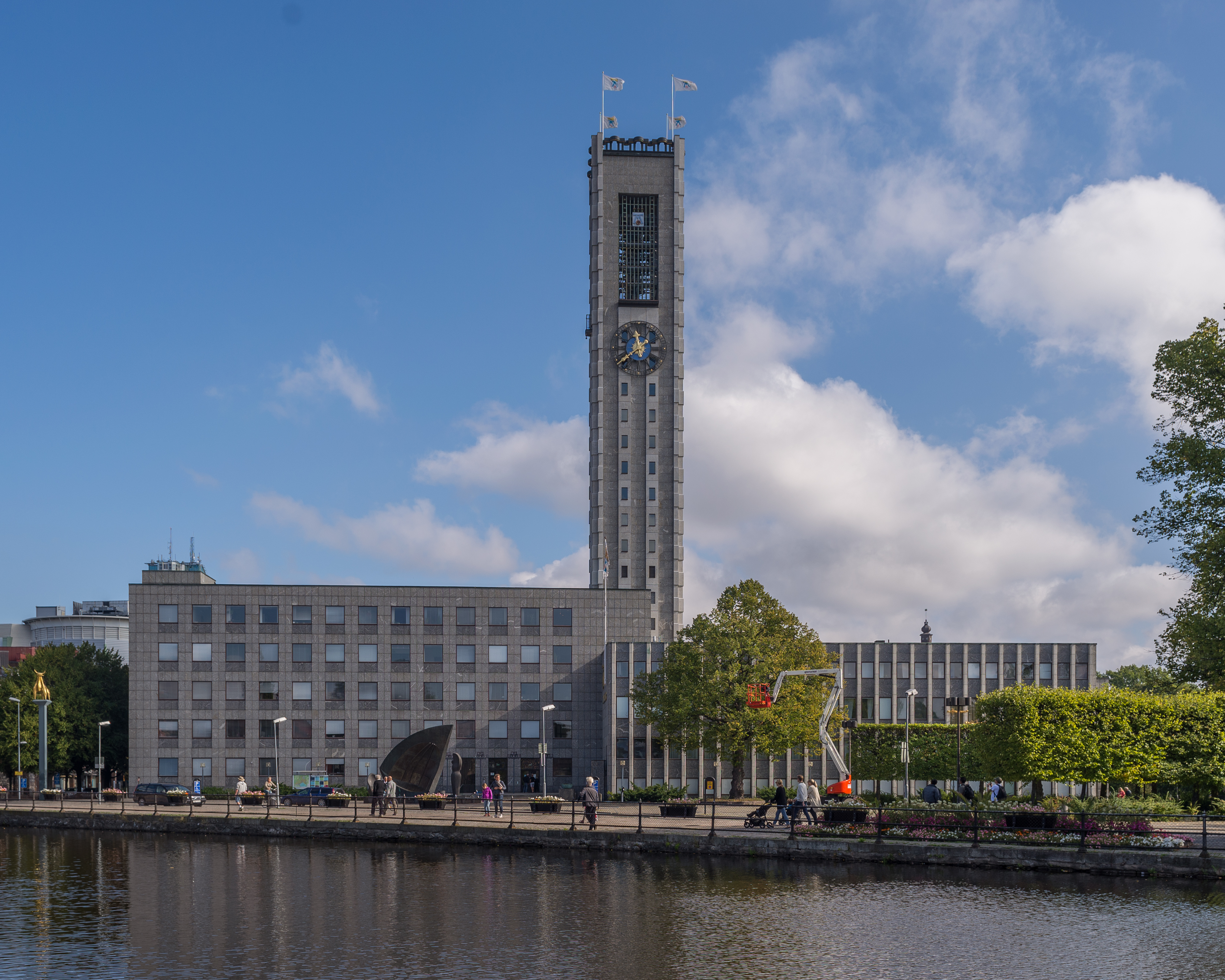
- Västerås City Hall

- Coat of arms

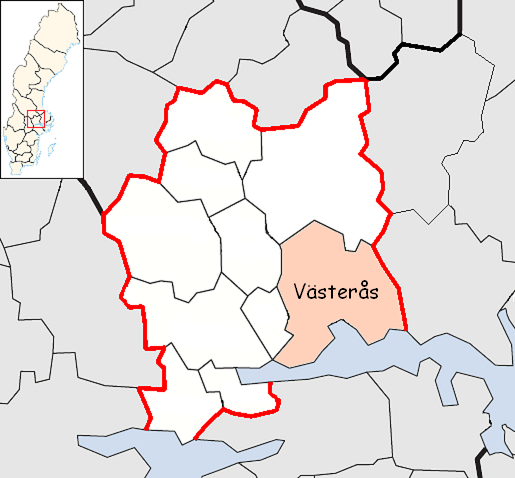
- Coordinates: 59°37′N 16°32′E
- Country: Sweden
- County: Västmanland County
- Seat: Västerås

Area
  - Total: 1,137.835976 km^{2} (439.320926 sq mi)
  - Land: 959.015976 km^{2} (370.278138 sq mi)
  - Water: 178.82 km^{2} (69.04 sq mi)
- Area as of 1 January 2014.

Population (30 June 2025)
  - Total: 161,050
  - Density: 167.93/km^{2} (434.94/sq mi)
- Time zone: UTC+1 (CET)
  - Summer (DST): UTC+2 (CEST)
- ISO 3166 code: SE
- Province: Västmanland
- Municipal code: 1980
- Website: www.vasteras.se
- Density is calculated using land area only.

Västerås Municipality (Swedish: Västerås kommun) is a municipality in Västmanland County in central Sweden. Its seat is located in the city of Västerås.

The municipality prefers to use the denomination Västerås stad (City of Västerås) for the whole territory, including rural areas.

The municipality evolved gradually during the municipal reforms in Sweden. Most of the amalgamations took place in 1967 and the municipality in its present form was created in 1971. There are 30 original local government units within the present municipality.

== Localities ==
As of 2018, there were 17 localities in the municipality:

Municipality	Population
Västerås	127 799
Skultuna	3 342
Hökåsen	3 023
Irsta	2 833
Kvicksund	2 208
Tillberga	2 164
Barkarö	1 546
Enhagen-Ekbacken	1 091
Dingtuna	1 032
Tidö-Lindö	710
Malmen	522
Örtagården	471
Tortuna	418
Harkie	284
Munga	272
Lycksta	240
Kärsta och Bredsdal	221

== Demographics ==
This is a demographic table based on Västerås Municipality's electoral districts in the 2022 Swedish general election sourced from SVT's election platform, in turn taken from SCB official statistics.

In total there were 156,510 residents, including 116,663 Swedish citizens of voting age. 46.8% voted for the left coalition and 51.9% for the right coalition. This made Västerås the most populated municipality in which the right coalition won the vote. Indicators are in percentage points except population totals and income.

Location	Residents	Citizen adults	Left vote	Right vote	Employed	Swedish parents	Foreign heritage	Income SEK	Degree
Location			%	%					
101 Centrum	1,572	1,429	45.8	53.8	75	71	29	26,218	45
102 Kyrkbacken	1,480	1,257	42.8	55.5	76	76	24	26,542	56
103 Herrgärdet	1,638	1,377	51.7	47.3	79	76	24	27,022	50
104 Kopparlunden	1,636	1,136	49.6	49.4	75	55	45	24,841	41
105 Östermalm	1,593	1,227	43.9	55.5	79	63	37	30,042	55
106 Östra Hamnen	1,694	1,476	40.5	58.8	87	76	24	36,688	65
107 Lillåudden	1,606	1,284	39.3	59.6	83	70	30	34,190	63
108 Norrmalm/Blåsbo	1,554	1,341	41.6	57.9	87	85	15	29,986	58
109 Aroslund/Iggebygärdet	1,679	1,322	45.4	53.4	80	78	22	27,061	53
110 Kristiansborg/Karlsdal	1,760	1,372	43.5	55.4	78	74	26	26,914	56
111 Annedal/Stallhagen	1,632	1,458	37.3	62.1	85	83	17	34,371	64
112 Oxbacken/Västermalm	1,617	1,407	47.2	51.9	81	76	24	25,258	54
113 Pettersberg Ö	1,221	1,025	49.4	49.4	83	75	25	26,848	49
114 Pettersberg V	3,042	1,619	64.7	29.9	54	21	79	14,560	26
115 Jakobsberg	1,801	1,452	40.9	58.4	84	83	17	32,033	66
116 Hammarby Stadshage	2,035	1,329	54.0	44.3	69	53	47	20,894	44
117 Vetterslund	1,632	1,193	54.3	43.5	77	57	43	24,027	45
201 Hammarby Ö	1,956	1,281	51.6	46.9	74	55	45	22,174	40
202 Hammarby V	1,617	1,311	57.9	38.1	66	35	65	20,134	33
203 Bäckby Ö	2,263	1,498	67.3	28.1	54	29	71	14,871	19
204 Bäckby N	2,099	1,287	67.3	28.6	57	20	80	16,691	22
205 Bäckby V	1,675	1,245	53.9	45.2	82	55	45	24,954	39
206 Bäckby C	1,483	1,106	59.0	38.8	76	44	56	23,031	31
207 Bäckby S	1,553	1,197	49.2	48.8	79	47	53	24,481	36
208 Skälby V	1,901	1,299	40.7	58.4	83	62	38	29,049	50
209 Skälby Ö	1,729	1,216	50.5	47.0	78	59	41	25,896	40
210 Stohagen/Spantgatan	1,615	1,287	52.0	46.3	76	71	29	25,615	46
211 Enhagen-Ekbacken	1,793	1,279	35.5	64.0	91	88	12	37,334	63
212 Barkarö/Tidö-Lindö	1,272	896	32.0	67.3	89	86	14	35,942	57
213 Barkarö C	1,778	1,192	39.2	59.6	91	89	11	36,249	70
214 Dingtuna-Lillhärad	1,744	1,324	39.6	59.9	88	89	11	31,863	45
215 Dingtuna C	1,011	721	37.1	62.6	89	86	14	29,292	39
216 Kvicksund/Rytterne	2,073	1,627	36.7	62.6	88	88	12	30,278	51
301 Skallberget S	1,678	1,159	57.1	39.9	60	45	55	16,808	30
302 Skallberget N	1,382	1,047	56.4	42.6	72	71	29	22,766	38
303 Nordanby	1,259	792	52.0	45.3	75	61	39	26,030	47
304 Gryta NÖ	1,950	1,460	52.2	47.4	88	82	18	30,799	59
305 Gryta NV	1,932	1,399	52.4	46.6	83	77	23	29,409	58
306 Önsta	1,737	1,251	48.2	50.9	79	67	33	30,099	53
307 Gryta SÖ	1,926	1,374	50.5	48.7	79	68	32	27,773	55
308 Gryta SV	1,919	1,348	52.6	45.9	74	67	33	25,773	44
309 Tunby-Vega	1,950	1,425	46.2	53.1	80	76	24	28,615	49
310 Rönnby S	1,980	1,472	41.3	57.6	89	87	13	33,185	67
311 Rönnby N	1,740	1,354	47.2	51.9	82	81	19	24,781	49
312 Fredriksberg	2,077	1,349	62.8	34.0	58	32	68	16,915	24
313 Råby S	1,621	1,138	61.0	36.5	67	35	65	19,000	35
314 Råby N	1,629	1,181	63.9	33.7	66	33	67	18,821	32
315 Råby Ö	1,298	946	57.5	41.2	71	45	55	20,007	31
316 Vallby S	2,195	1,331	65.4	30.0	55	19	81	14,069	27
317 Eriksborg/Hagaberg	1,819	1,324	44.9	53.8	84	59	41	29,016	54
318 Brottberga/Vallby N	1,919	1,428	35.3	63.3	82	55	45	30,410	49
319 Vallby C/Bjärby	2,255	1,379	48.7	48.0	65	38	62	18,951	33
320 Skultuna	1,813	1,254	48.4	50.8	76	76	24	24,698	36
321 Skultuna C	2,000	1,381	49.1	50.0	73	70	30	21,414	26
322 Haraker Romfartuna	2,043	1,648	38.3	60.0	86	89	11	28,076	39
401 Emaus	973	976	48.0	50.3	78	63	37	25,852	59
402 Bergslagsparken	1,324	1,071	45.5	53.8	83	75	25	27,075	46
403 Gideonsberg	1,754	1,324	53.8	45.7	73	69	31	21,882	41
404 Skälängen	1,559	1,313	52.7	46.2	79	72	28	24,541	44
405 Nordanby gärde	1,637	1,328	52.5	46.7	81	69	31	25,367	44
406 Sandgärdet	1,606	1,292	44.8	53.9	80	77	23	26,067	43
407 Haga	1,587	1,326	46.5	52.2	79	74	26	23,222	43
408 Skjutbanegatan	1,572	1,344	44.5	54.0	81	71	29	24,856	39
409 Hemdal	1,837	1,428	46.7	52.3	78	74	26	26,408	51
410 Malmaberg S	1,945	1,551	50.3	48.2	69	68	32	21,297	35
411 Malmaberg N	1,775	1,375	50.4	48.9	78	76	24	26,402	51
412 Klockartorp	1,793	1,500	45.7	53.2	79	79	21	24,068	37
413 Skiljebo S	1,699	1,289	46.5	52.6	87	81	19	31,933	58
414 Skiljebo N	1,747	1,333	50.1	47.4	68	63	37	19,881	37
415 Odensviplatsen	1,536	1,150	54.6	44.7	78	67	33	21,690	40
416 Brandthovda	1,315	984	43.2	56.2	89	83	17	33,273	59
417 Bjurhovda SV	1,552	1,042	53.6	44.2	69	52	48	21,272	28
418 Bjurhovda SO	1,610	1,136	49.2	48.2	67	64	36	21,772	30
419 Bjurhovda N	1,730	1,376	42.8	56.2	90	83	17	31,936	51
420 Hökåsen/Tillberga	1,974	1,386	31.8	67.3	88	90	10	31,356	50
421 Hökåsen C	1,852	1,315	40.8	58.5	91	86	14	31,319	48
422 Tillberga C	2,121	1,563	40.2	59.2	85	88	12	28,097	34
423 Tortuna/Sevalla	1,075	844	34.6	63.6	89	93	7	28,982	41
501 Viksäng V/Ängsgärdet	1,539	1,353	58.6	39.6	63	53	47	17,488	36
502 Viksäng/Stenhagen	1,715	1,373	50.4	47.7	79	72	28	24,536	47
503 Viksäng Ö	1,933	1,285	51.0	47.6	81	71	29	26,423	48
504 Talltorp/Lillhamra	2,030	1,282	40.2	58.8	88	80	20	35,351	67
505 Notudden	1,561	1,244	41.6	57.4	85	65	35	32,065	58
506 Mälarparken	1,270	1,029	44.8	54.6	87	77	23	31,394	54
507 Framnäs	1,371	1,185	38.7	60.5	87	86	14	34,017	70
508 Berghamra/Hamre	2,003	1,416	39.4	59.9	80	83	17	33,632	66
509 Gäddeholm	1,316	801	41.1	58.5	94	87	13	39,511	70
510 Irsta S	1,282	928	35.4	63.6	90	89	11	30,579	49
511 Irsta N	1,464	999	41.8	57.8	91	91	9	33,685	57
512 Björksta/Kungsåra	1,518	1,178	37.6	60.8	85	90	10	28,348	38
513 Öster Mälarstrand	1,518	1,241	45.0	54.3	86	67	33	32,060	58
514 Kärrbolandet	1,541	1,193	35.7	63.7	89	89	11	31,378	51
Source: SVT

== International relations ==
=== Twin towns — Sister cities ===
Västerås is twinned with:

- (Finland) Lahti
- (Denmark) Randers
- (Norway) Ålesund
- (Iceland) Akureyri
- (Czech Republic) České Budějovice
- (Bosnia and Herzegovina) Banja Luka
- (Germany) Kassel
- (China) Jinan
- (Botswana) Gaborone
