= Arboga Municipality =

Arboga Municipality Arboga kommun
- Municipality
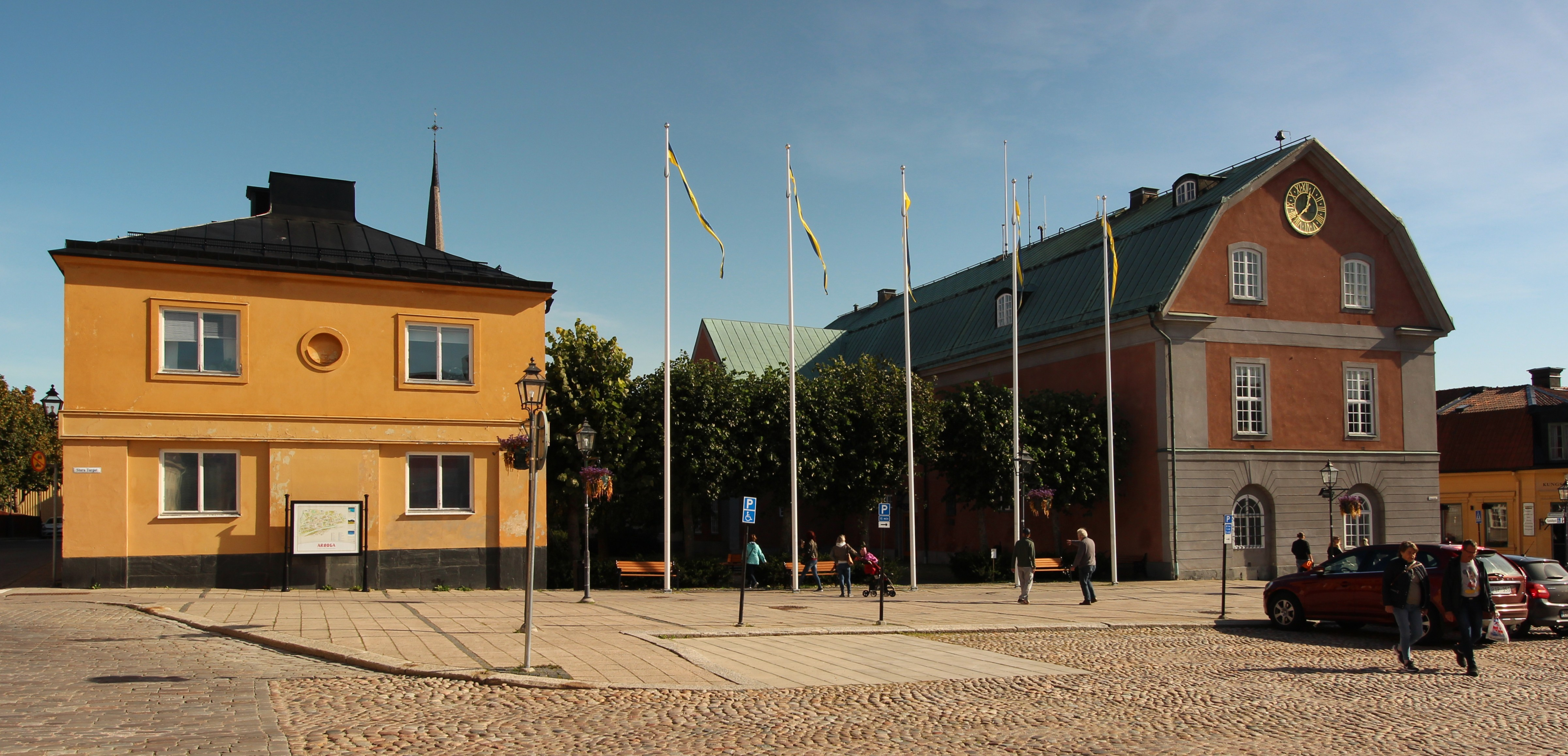
- Arboga town hall

- Flag Coat of arms

- Coordinates: 59°24′N 15°50′E
- Country: Sweden
- County: Västmanland County
- Seat: Arboga

Area
  - Total: 419.37 km^{2} (161.92 sq mi)
  - Land: 325.43 km^{2} (125.65 sq mi)
  - Water: 93.94 km^{2} (36.27 sq mi)
- Area as of 1 January 2014.

Population (30 June 2025)
  - Total: 13,924
  - Density: 42.786/km^{2} (110.82/sq mi)
- Time zone: UTC+1 (CET)
  - Summer (DST): UTC+2 (CEST)
- ISO 3166 code: SE
- Province: Västmanland and Närke
- Municipal code: 1984
- Website: www.arboga.se

Arboga Municipality (Swedish: Arboga kommun) is a municipality in Västmanland County in central Sweden. Its seat is located in the city of Arboga.

In 1971 the City of Arboga was amalgamated with a part of the rural municipality Medåker, forming a municipality of unitary type. In 1974 the parish Götlanda was added from the dissolved Glanshammar municipality and transferred from Örebro County.

== Localities ==
- Arboga (seat)
- Götlunda
- Kvarnsjön
- Medåker
- Medinge
- Värhulta

== Demographics ==
This is a demographic table based on Arboga Municipality's electoral districts in the 2022 Swedish general election sourced from SVT's election platform, in turn taken from SCB official statistics.

In total there were 14,061 residents, including 10,941 Swedish citizens of voting age. 47.3% voted for the left coalition and 51.6% for the right coalition. Indicators are in percentage points except population totals and income.

Location	Residents	Citizen adults	Left vote	Right vote	Employed	Swedish parents	Foreign heritage	Income SEK	Degree
Location			%	%					
Brattberget-Strömnäs	2,306	1,772	46.0	52.7	80	82	18	25,161	36
Götlunda-Medåker	2,103	1,712	42.1	56.6	87	93	7	26,443	35
Herrängen-Ekbacken	1,158	898	45.2	53.2	78	79	21	23,102	31
Ladubacksgärdena	1,765	1,324	46.8	52.4	86	87	13	27,230	38
Landsförsamlingen	1,496	1,073	44.8	54.8	72	69	31	22,213	27
Prästgärdet	1,374	1,122	51.3	48.2	84	86	14	25,733	25
Ringsborg-Strömsborg	1,979	1,597	49.5	48.8	71	66	34	19,127	27
Sturestaden-Nästkvarn	1,880	1,443	54.7	43.9	72	80	20	20,793	31
Source: SVT

== Riksdag elections ==
Year	%	Votes	V	S	MP	C	L	KD	M	SD	NyD	Left	Right
1973	91.6	9,486	4.3	50.7		24.4	9.1	1.0	10.3			55.0	43.8
1976	92.9	9,789	3.4	49.9		23.6	10.4	1.1	11.4			53.3	45.4
1979	91.0	9,853	4.2	51.0		17.1	10.7	1.2	15.2			55.2	43.0
1982	91.8	10,019	4.3	53.7	1.3	15.3	5.8	1.9	17.6			58.0	38.7
1985	90.1	9,859	4.4	53.2	1.7	12.2	12.2		16.2			57.6	40.6
1988	85.5	9,321	5.4	50.3	4.9	11.2	10.5	2.5	14.2			60.6	35.9
1991	86.3	9,499	4.2	45.3	3.5	8.4	8.8	6.7	17.2		5.3	49.5	41.1
1994	87.0	9,510	6.7	50.9	5.7	7.1	6.6	3.5	17.5		1.0	63.3	34.7
1998	82.0	8,589	13.5	41.9	5.9	5.2	4.1	10.7	17.9			61.3	37.9
2002	79.8	8,169	8.8	44.3	5.2	6.9	12.3	8.3	11.6	1.0		58.3	39.1
2006	81.0	8,207	6.4	42.1	3.9	8.8	6.6	5.2	21.1	2.5		52.4	41.7
2010	83.6	8,565	5.7	37.6	6.3	5.8	6.8	4.5	26.4	6.0		49.6	43.5
2014	85.2	8,975	5.0	38.3	5.2	5.5	3.9	3.5	20.6	15.5		48.5	33.5
2018	87.5	9,233	5.8	33.8	3.2	6.8	3.9	5.1	18.7	21.7		49.5	49.4
2022	84.0	9,081	4.8	33.8	3.5	5.2	3.6	4.8	17.6	25.6		47.3	51.6
