= Tidö-Lindö =

- Location within Västmanland Location within Sweden
- Coordinates: 59°31′N 16°31′E
- Country: Sweden
- Province: Västmanland
- County: Västmanland County
- Municipality: Västerås Municipality

Area
  - Total: 1.20 km^{2} (0.46 sq mi)

Population (31 December 2010)
  - Total: 637
  - Density: 531/km^{2} (1,380/sq mi)
- Time zone: UTC+1 (CET)
  - Summer (DST): UTC+2 (CEST)

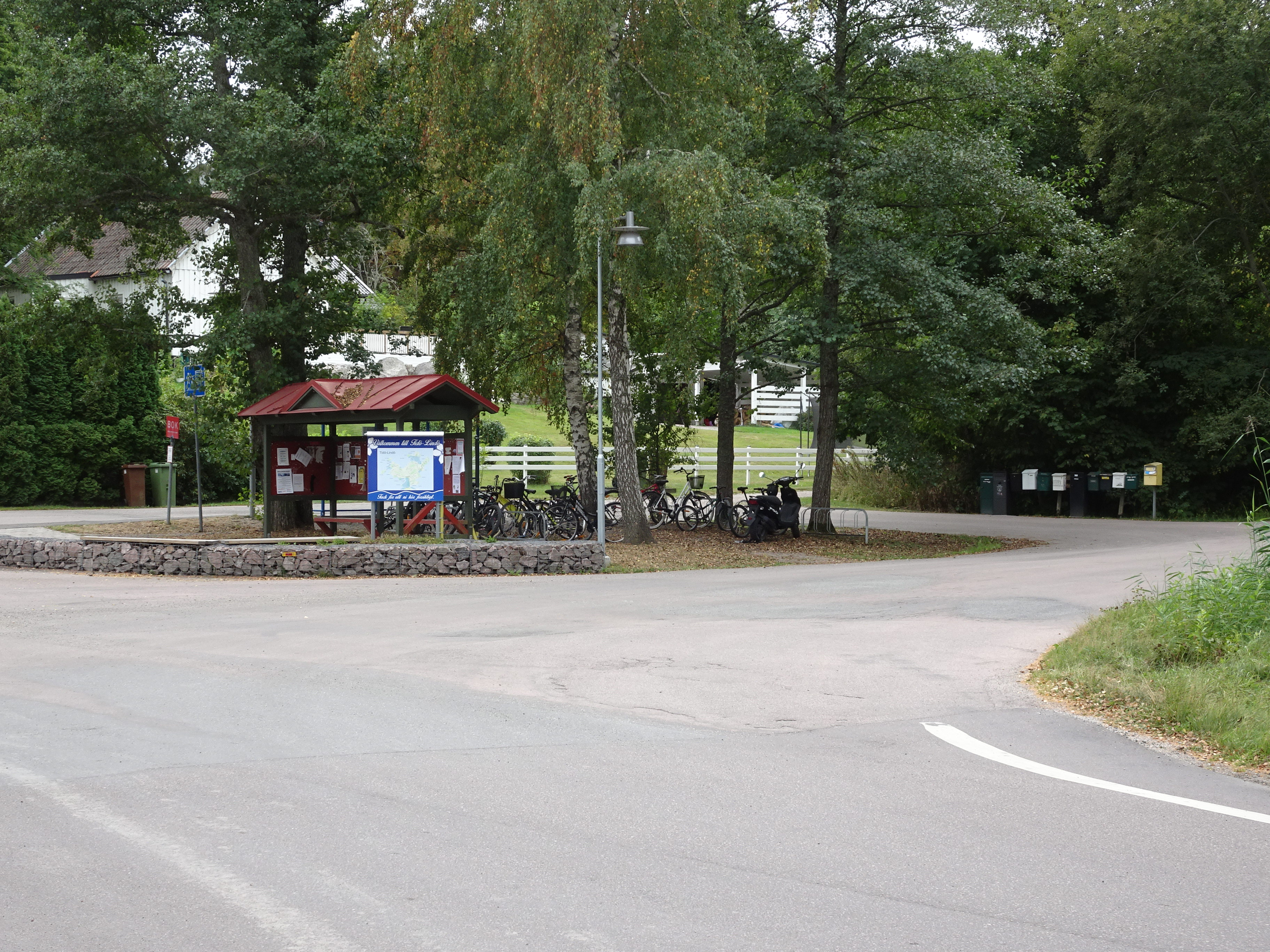
Tidö-Lindö is a minor locality, about 12 kilometers south from Västerås city center in Sweden.

Tidö-Lindö is a locality situated in Västerås Municipality, Västmanland County, Sweden with 637 inhabitants in 2010.
