= Munga =

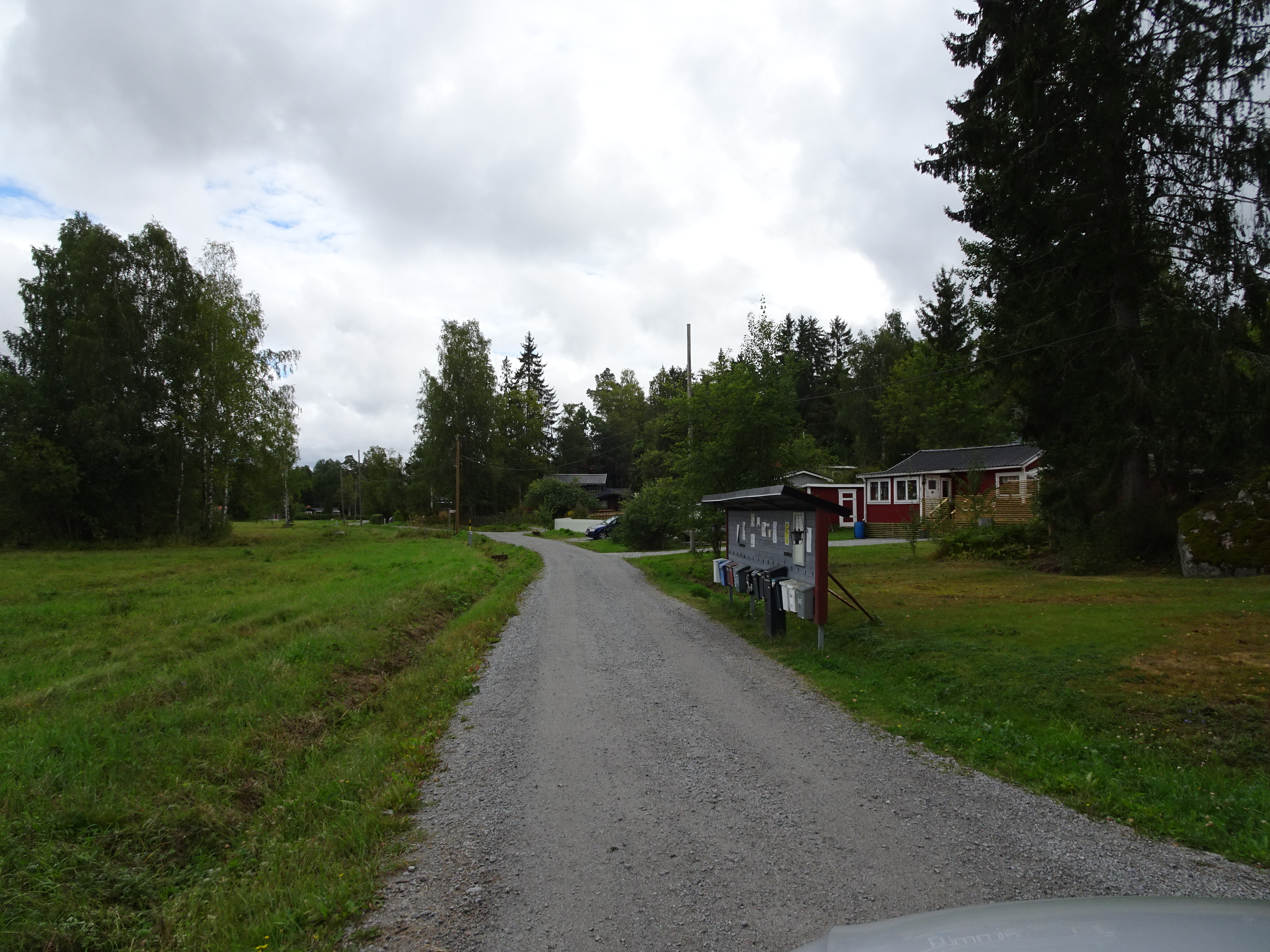

- Location within Västmanland Location within Sweden
- Coordinates: 59°44′40″N 16°31′35″E
- Country: Sweden
- Province: Västmanland
- County: Västmanland County
- Municipality: Västerås Municipality

Area
  - Total: 0.55 km^{2} (0.21 sq mi)

Population (31 December 2010)
  - Total: 212
  - Density: 383/km^{2} (990/sq mi)
- Time zone: UTC+1 (CET)
  - Summer (DST): UTC+2 (CEST)

Munga is a locality situated in Västerås Municipality, Västmanland County, Sweden with 212 inhabitants in 2010.
