= Anders Karlsson (mathematician) =

Swedish mathematician (born 1972)

Anders Karlsson (born 30 December 1972) is a Swedish mathematician working on ergodic theory, metric geometry, and their applications across various mathematical disciplines. He is currently holding academic positions at both the University of Geneva and Uppsala University.

== Early life and education ==
Karlsson was born in 1972 in Österhaninge, Stockholm. He studied Engineering Physics at KTH where he earned a Master of science. He pursued doctoral studies at Yale University, obtaining his Ph.D. in Mathematics in 2000, under the mentorship of Grigory Margulis.

== Career ==
Following his Ph.D., Karlsson held postdoctoral positions at ETH Zürich (2000–2002) and the University of Neuchâtel (2002–2003). From 2003 to 2009, he served as a research assistant at KTH, during which he was a visiting assistant professor at Yale University in 2005. Between 2008 and 2011, he was a research fellow of the Royal Swedish Academy of Sciences and a lecturer at KTH. In 2010, he joined the University of Geneva as an associate professor, and since 2013, he has also been a professor at Uppsala University.

== Research contributions ==
Karlsson's research interests encompass ergodic theory, metric geometry, heat kernels, spectral graph theory, analytic number theory, and group theory. He has explored their applications in complex analysis, mathematical physics, and deep learning. His work on non-commuting random products and metric functional analysis has found applications in random walks on groups, operator theory, and neural networks. Additionally, he has investigated asymptotics and connections between zeta functions of graphs, spaces, and numbers through heat kernel analysis. As a deep learning expert, he also focuses on Artificial Intelligence and its link to mathematical research. He was invited as Keynote speaker to talk about AI's role in shaping the present and future at the 2023 Game Changer Talks. Karlsson helps to spread mathematics to the general public, for example by contributing to popular science articles or celebrating Pi day.

== Awards and honors ==
- 1994 Gunnar Wallquist Study Medal and KTH Honorary Scholarship
- 2000 Alfred P. Sloan Dissertation Fellowship
- 2008 Wallenberg Prize
- 2015 Edlund Prize
- 2017 Gårding Prize from The Royal Physiographic Society of Lund

== Selected publications ==
- A. Karlsson, F. Ledrappier (2006). "On laws of large numbers for random walks". The Annals of Probability, 34(5), 1693–1706. (DOI: 10.1214/009117906000000296)
- Fabien Friedli, Anders Karlsson (2017). "Spectral zeta functions of graphs and the Riemann zeta function in the critical strip." Tohoku Math. J. (2) 69 (4) 585 - 610. (DOI: 10.2748/tmj/1512183631)
- Sébastien Gouëzel, Anders Karlsson (2020). "Subadditive and multiplicative ergodic theorems". J. Eur. Math. Soc. 22 , no. 6, pp. 1893–1915. (DOI:10.4171/JEMS/958)
- Anders Karlsson (2021). "From Linear to Metric Functional Analysis". Proc. Natl. Acad. Sci. U.S.A. 118 (28) e2107069118. (DOI:10.1073/pnas.2107069118)
- Benny Avelin, Anders Karlsson(2022). "Deep limits and a cut-off phenomenon for neural networks". J. Mach. Learn. Res. 23, 1, Article 191.
- Anders Karlsson (2024). "A Metric Fixed Point Theorem and Some of Its Applications". Geom. Funct. Anal. 34, 486–511. (DOI: 10.1007/s00039-024-00658-x)
