= Hallstahammar Municipality =

Hallstahammar Municipality Hallstahammars kommun
- Municipality
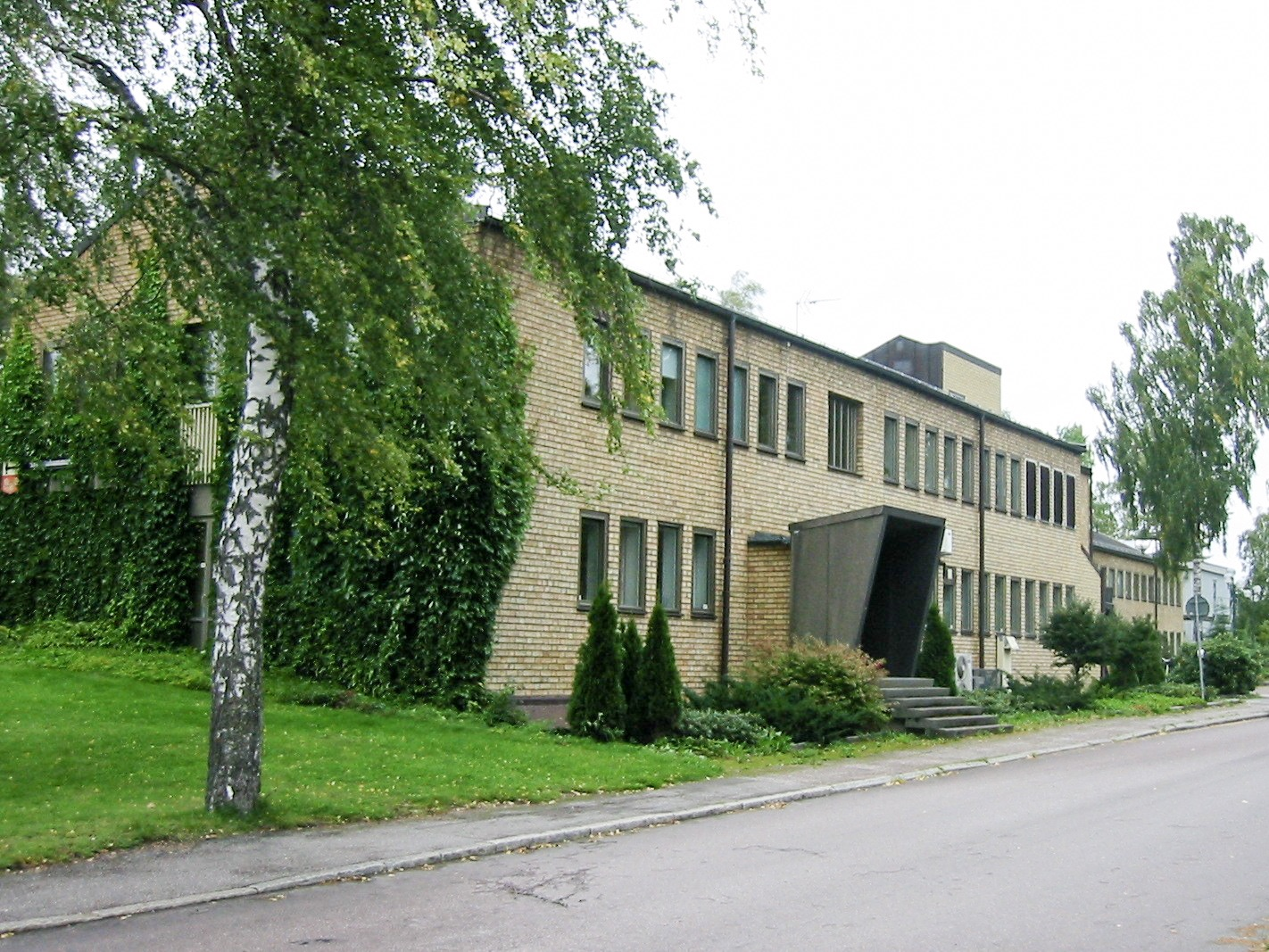
- Hallstahammar Town Hall

- Coat of arms

- Coordinates: 59°37′N 16°15′E
- Country: Sweden
- County: Västmanland County
- Seat: Hallstahammar

Area
  - Total: 180.134024 km^{2} (69.550135 sq mi)
  - Land: 169.574024 km^{2} (65.472897 sq mi)
  - Water: 10.56 km^{2} (4.08 sq mi)
- Area as of 1 January 2014.

Population (30 June 2025)
  - Total: 16,574
  - Density: 97.739/km^{2} (253.14/sq mi)
- Time zone: UTC+1 (CET)
  - Summer (DST): UTC+2 (CEST)
- ISO 3166 code: SE
- Province: Västmanland
- Municipal code: 1961
- Website: www.hallstahammar.se

Hallstahammar Municipality (Swedish: Hallstahammars kommun) is a municipality in Västmanland County in central Sweden. Its seat is located in the town of Hallstahammar.

In 1971 "old" Hallstahammar (with the status of a köping since 1943) was amalgamated with parts of the dissolved Kolbäck rural municipality to form the present unitary municipality.

The municipal slogan is "Bo hos oss" ("Live with us"), which reflects the ambition of the present municipal leadership to boost population figures.

== Geography ==
The municipality is subdivided into two parishes: Hallstahammar-Berg and Kolbäck-Säby. Hallstahammar-Berg in the north is situated along forest lands; Kolbäck-Säby in the south is a centre of communications by roads and railways as well as the intersecting river. Strömsholm, in the southern part of Kolbäck, borders Lake Mälaren and has open fields around its Royal Castle.

== Demographics ==
This is a demographic table based on Hallstahammar Municipality's electoral districts in the 2022 Swedish general election sourced from SVT's election platform, in turn taken from SCB official statistics.

In total there were 16,581 residents, including 12,314 Swedish citizens of voting age. 47.7% voted for the left coalition and 50.7% for the right coalition. Indicators are in percentage points except population totals and income.

Location	Residents	Citizen adults	Left vote	Right vote	Employed	Swedish parents	Foreign heritage	Income SEK	Degree
Location			%	%					
Barnängen	1,397	1,083	51.4	46.8	76	66	34	22,305	27
Eldsboda	1,584	1,214	43.5	55.9	82	78	22	25,895	32
Fredhem	1,880	1,336	47.8	51.1	87	78	22	27,630	34
Kolbäcks C	1,268	985	47.0	51.8	80	85	15	22,629	28
Lövboås	1,844	1,238	59.8	38.3	67	49	51	20,436	24
Nibble	2,321	1,551	47.4	50.2	69	56	44	19,763	20
Näs	1,563	1,213	47.4	51.1	87	84	16	27,369	38
Strömsholm	1,375	1,111	42.5	56.3	85	88	12	28,842	42
Tuna	1,832	1,393	50.3	47.9	81	72	28	23,568	29
Tunbo	1,517	1,190	43.2	55.1	87	84	16	27,313	33
Source: SVT

== Riksdag elections ==
Year	%	Votes	V	S	MP	C	L	KD	M	SD	NyD	Left	Right
1973	91.9	10,459	6.7	59.8		17.9	6.9	1.1	7.2			66.5	32.0
1976	92.3	10,852	5.2	59.4		16.5	8.5	1.2	8.8			64.6	33.8
1979	91.4	10,682	5.8	60.4		11.3	8.9	0.9	11.6			66.2	31.9
1982	92.1	10,976	6.8	62.2	0.8	9.6	4.4	1.4	14.3			69.1	28.3
1985	90.0	10,764	7.4	60.7	0.9	7.4	10.1		13.3			68.1	30.8
1988	85.7	10,231	8.0	59.2	3.1	6.7	9.3	1.6	10.6			70.3	26.6
1991	86.4	10,177	5.6	55.0	1.8	4.5	7.5	4.7	12.3		7.8	60.6	29.0
1994	86.5	9,938	8.5	61.3	3.3	4.3	5.1	2.3	12.6		1.3	73.0	24.3
1998	79.5	8,745	16.2	49.7	3.6	3.7	3.3	8.3	14.0			69.6	29.3
2002	77.1	8,345	10.6	52.3	3.3	4.3	9.8	8.3	8.3	1.9		66.2	30.8
2006	79.3	8,588	7.5	49.1	3.7	5.3	5.9	7.2	16.0	2.8		60.3	34.5
2010	82.4	9,203	7.3	47.0	4.8	3.5	6.1	4.3	20.4	5.7		59.0	34.3
2014	83.9	9,655	6.1	45.0	4.0	3.8	3.8	3.3	15.0	16.6		55.1	25.9
2018	85.8	10,063	8.0	36.2	2.2	5.3	4.0	5.1	14.7	23.3		51.6	47.0
2022	83.2	10,125	5.9	34.9	2.6	4.3	2.9	4.9	14.8	28.2		47.7	50.7

== Communications ==
By train, Hallstahammar is 10 minutes from the centre of Västerås (a larger city), and about an hour from the Central Station of Stockholm. There is also a connection to the larger city of Eskilstuna via a bridge over Lake Mälaren.

Good car transport is provided by European route E18 that passes between Kolbäck and Hallstahammar.

== Notable places ==
One of Sweden's foremost riding gymnasiums is located in Strömsholm, as part of the Kantzowska Gymnasium. The Church of Kolbäck goes back to the 13th century and has interior decorations paid for by Queen Hedvig Eleonora in the 17th century. The Church of Säby was beautifully restored in the 1630s.
