= Anders Karlsson (ice hockey) =

Swedish ice hockey player

- Born: August 5, 1957 (age 68) Sweden
- Position: Defence
- Played for: HV71; Södertälje SK
- NHL draft: Undrafted
- Playing career: 1977–1984

Anders Karlsson (born August 5, 1957) is a Swedish former professional ice hockey defenceman. Between 1979 and 1981, Karlsson played in the Swedish Elitserien with HV71 and Södertälje SK.
