= Anders Hans Karlsson =

Swedish agronomist

Anders Hans Karlsson (born July 22, 1959) is a Swedish scientist and agronomist working in Denmark since 1996. As of 2004, he is Professor at the University of Copenhagen's Department of Food Science until 2016. From 2016 he was appointed Professor at Swedish University of Agricultural Sciences, and upon retirement in 2025 he received the title Professor Emeritus.

== Biography ==
Karlsson was born in Västerås, Sweden, and is the son of Hans Valter Karlsson (b. 1931, d 2022) and Gunvor Agnes 20 km west of Västerås, in the province Västmanland.

In 1989 Karlsson received his M.Sc. degree in agricultural science (animal science and meat science), and in 1993 he received his Ph.D. degree in meat science. Both these degrees were received from the Swedish University of Agricultural Sciences in Uppsala, Sweden. In January 2004, he was appointed Professor at the University of Copenhagen in Meat science. Between 2004 and 2010, he also acted as the head of the Meat Science Research Section, which operated under the University of Copenhagen's Department of Food Science in Frederiksberg, Denmark.
