= Västmanland County =

County (län) of Sweden

Coordinates: 59°38′44″N 16°25′28″E

Västmanland County Västmanlands län (Swedish)
- County of Sweden
- Flag Coat of arms

- Västmanland County in Sweden

- Location map of Västmanland County in Sweden
- Country: Sweden
- Founded: 1634
- Capital: Västerås
- Municipalities: 10: Arboga; Fagersta; Hallstahammar; Köping; Kungsör; Norberg; Sala; Skinnskatteberg; Surahammar; Västerås

Government
  - Governor: Johan Sterte
  - Council: Region Västmanland

Area
  - Total: 5,145.8 km^{2} (1,986.8 sq mi)

Population (30 June 2025)
  - Total: 281,025
  - Density: 54.612/km^{2} (141.45/sq mi)

GDP
  - Total: SEK 96 billion €10.264 billion (2015)
- Time zone: UTC+1 (CET)
  - Summer (DST): UTC+2 (CEST)
- ISO 3166 code: SE-U
- NUTS Region: SE125
- Website: www.u.lst.se

Västmanland County (Swedish: Västmanlands län, pronounced [ˈvɛ̂stmanlands ˈlɛːn]) is a county or län in central Sweden. It borders the counties of Södermanland, Örebro, Gävleborg, Dalarna and Uppsala. The county also has a stretch of shoreline towards Mälaren (Sweden's third largest lake).

== Province ==
For history, geography and culture, see: Västmanland (Westmannia)

== Administration ==
The main aim of the County Administrative Board is to fulfil the goals set in national politics by the Riksdag and the Government, to coordinate the interests of the county, to promote the development of the county, to establish regional goals and safeguard the due process of law in the handling of each case. The County Administrative Board is a Government Agency headed by a Governor. See List of Västmanland Governors.

== Politics ==
The County Council of Västmanland or Landstinget Västmanland.

== Riksdag elections ==
The table details all Riksdag election results of Västmanland County since the unicameral era began in 1970. The blocs denote which party would support the Prime Minister or the lead opposition party towards the end of the elected parliament.

Year	Turnout	Votes	V	S	MP	C	L	KD	M	SD	NyD	Left	Right
1970	87.9	148,587	4.8	53.5		17.8	14.8	1.4	7.3			58.3	39.9
1973	90.7	155,418	5.2	50.8		23.2	9.0	1.4	9.7			56.0	42.0
1976	91.7	163,608	4.3	50.3		21.0	11.2	1.2	11.6			54.6	43.8
1979	90.7	164,056	5.1	50.5		15.5	10.7	1.1	16.1			55.6	42.3
1982	91.6	167,995	5.5	52.6	1.4	13.4	5.9	1.5	19.4			58.2	38.7
1985	89.7	167,297	5.3	51.7	1.3	10.4	13.8		17.0			57.0	41.3
1988	85.0	158,748	5.8	50.2	4.5	9.6	12.7	2.3	14.0			60.5	36.4
1991	85.9	162,451	4.4	44.1	2.8	6.9	9.7	6.4	17.7		7.5	48.5	40.7
1994	86.5	164,306	6.3	51.2	4.7	6.0	7.2	3.3	19.0		1.2	62.2	35.6
1998	80.4	150,609	13.3	41.1	4.3	4.7	4.5	10.8	19.9			58.7	39.8
2002	78.4	149,321	8.7	45.0	4.4	5.7	13.3	8.0	12.4	1.1		58.0	39.4
2006	80.8	148,299	6.2	39.8	4.3	6.9	8.1	5.7	23.3	2.5		50.3	44.0
2010	84.4	160,143	5.7	36.4	5.9	5.2	7.5	4.6	27.1	6.2		48.0	44.4
2014	85.2	166,939	5.4	35.9	5.1	5.2	5.2	3.9	21.4	14.8		46.4	35.7
2018	86.7	172,719	7.1	31.4	3.0	6.7	5.5	5.8	19.2	20.1		48.1	50.5
2022	83.0	172,842	6.1	32.0	3.2	5.4	4.2	5.0	19.1	23.7		46.7	52.0

== Municipalities ==
The lake at the lower right is Mälaren; at the lower left is Hjälmaren.

- Arboga
- Fagersta
- Hallstahammar
- Kungsör
- Köping
- Norberg
- Sala
- Skinnskatteberg
- Surahammar
- Västerås

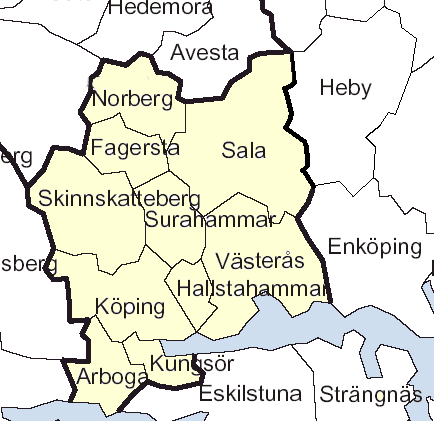

== Demographics ==
=== Foreign background ===
SCB have collected statistics on backgrounds of residents since 2002. These tables consist of all who have two foreign-born parents or are born abroad themselves. The chart lists election years and the last year on record alone. Heby Municipality was included in the 2002 overall statistics, since it was part of the county at the time.

Location	2002	2006	2010	2014	2018	2019
Arboga	9.6	10.9	12.1	15.4	19.0	19.2
Fagersta	21.6	23.1	26.0	31.2	34.7	35.0
Hallstahammar	21.5	22.1	22.8	24.7	26.7	27.3
Kungsör	14.1	14.5	15.4	18.9	24.8	25.2
Köping	18.4	19.4	21.6	24.9	28.7	29.0
Norberg	12.0	13.3	13.0	16.7	19.7	19.7
Sala	9.7	10.1	11.6	13.8	18.0	18.3
Skinnskatteberg	17.7	17.7	18.7	22.2	23.0	23.5
Surahammar	24.2	24.3	24.8	26.2	27.2	27.1
Västerås	20.3	21.9	24.2	26.4	29.9	30.8
Total	17.8	19.6	21.6	24.2	27.7	28.4
Source: SCB

== Heraldry ==
The County of Västmanland inherited its coat of arms from the province of Västmanland. When it is shown with a royal crown it represents the County Administrative Board.

== Sports ==
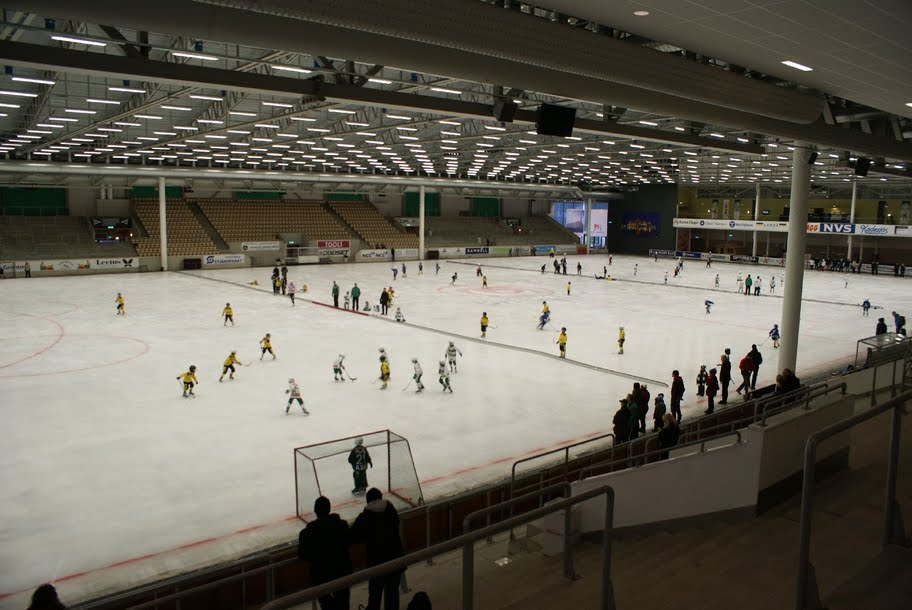
ABB Arena Syd, the largest permanent indoor arena for bandy in Sweden

Football in the county is administered by Västmanlands Fotbollförbund. Bandy is also popular, with the most successful Swedish team Västerås SK. Several Bandy World Championship finals have been played in Västerås.
