= Norrbäck, Uppland =

Norrbäck
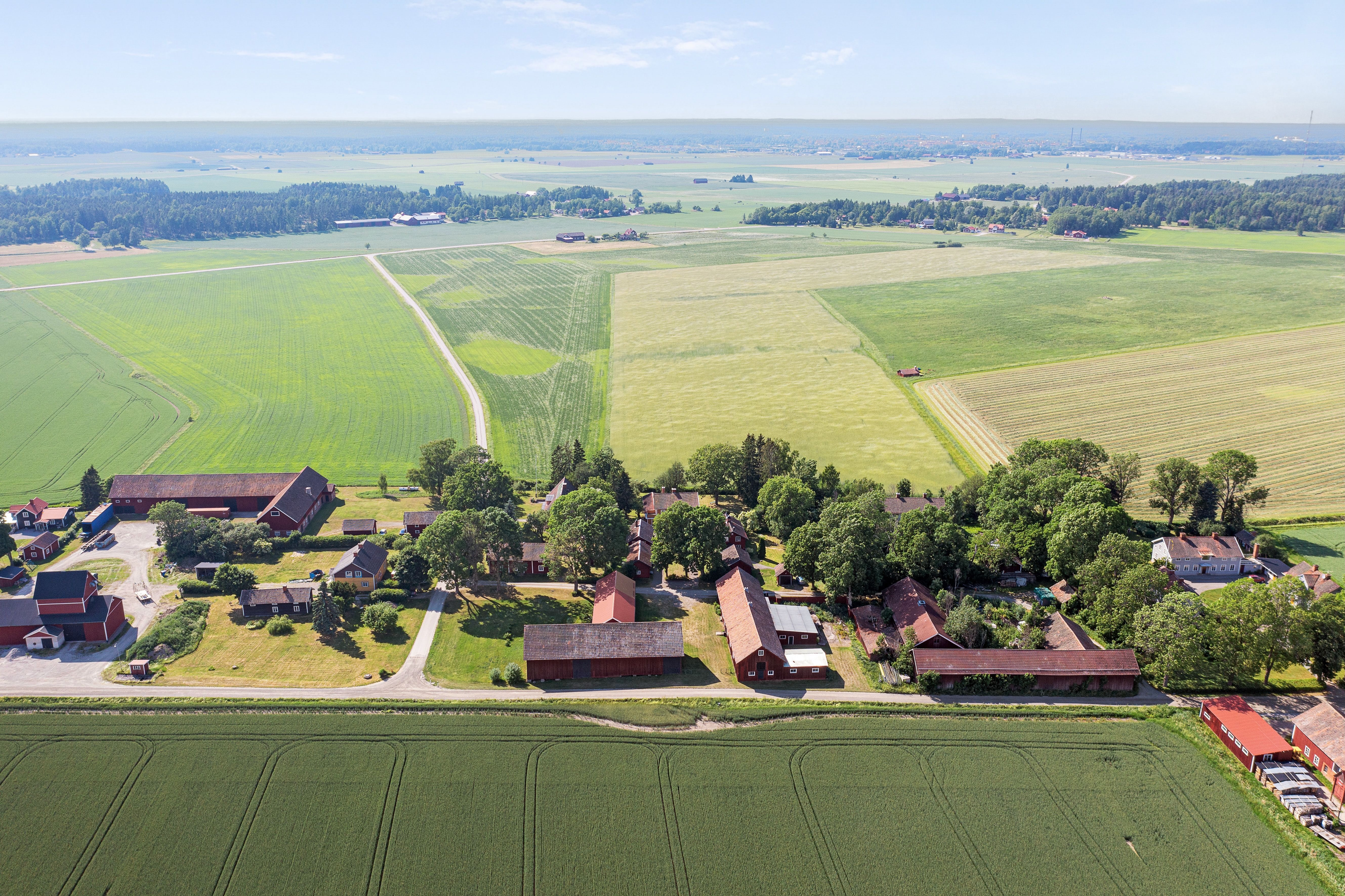
- Above Norrbäck, looking northwest towards Sala

- Location within Västmanland Location within Sweden
- Coordinates: 59°53′45.9″N 16°40′20.2″E
- Country: Sweden
- Province: Uppland
- County: Västmanland County
- Municipality: Sala Municipality
- Time zone: UTC+1 (CET)
  - Summer (DST): UTC+2 (CEST)
- Postal code: 733 92
- Area code: (+46) 224

Norrbäck is a settlement in the historical province of Uppland, Västmanland County, Sweden. Located in the Sala Municipality, it is about two miles (3.2 kilometres) southeast of the city of Sala, and about 63 miles (101 km) northwest of Stockholm, the country's capital city.

Norrbäck's postal code (or postnummer) is 733 92; its telephone dialing prefix is 46; and its area code is 22.

== Amenities ==
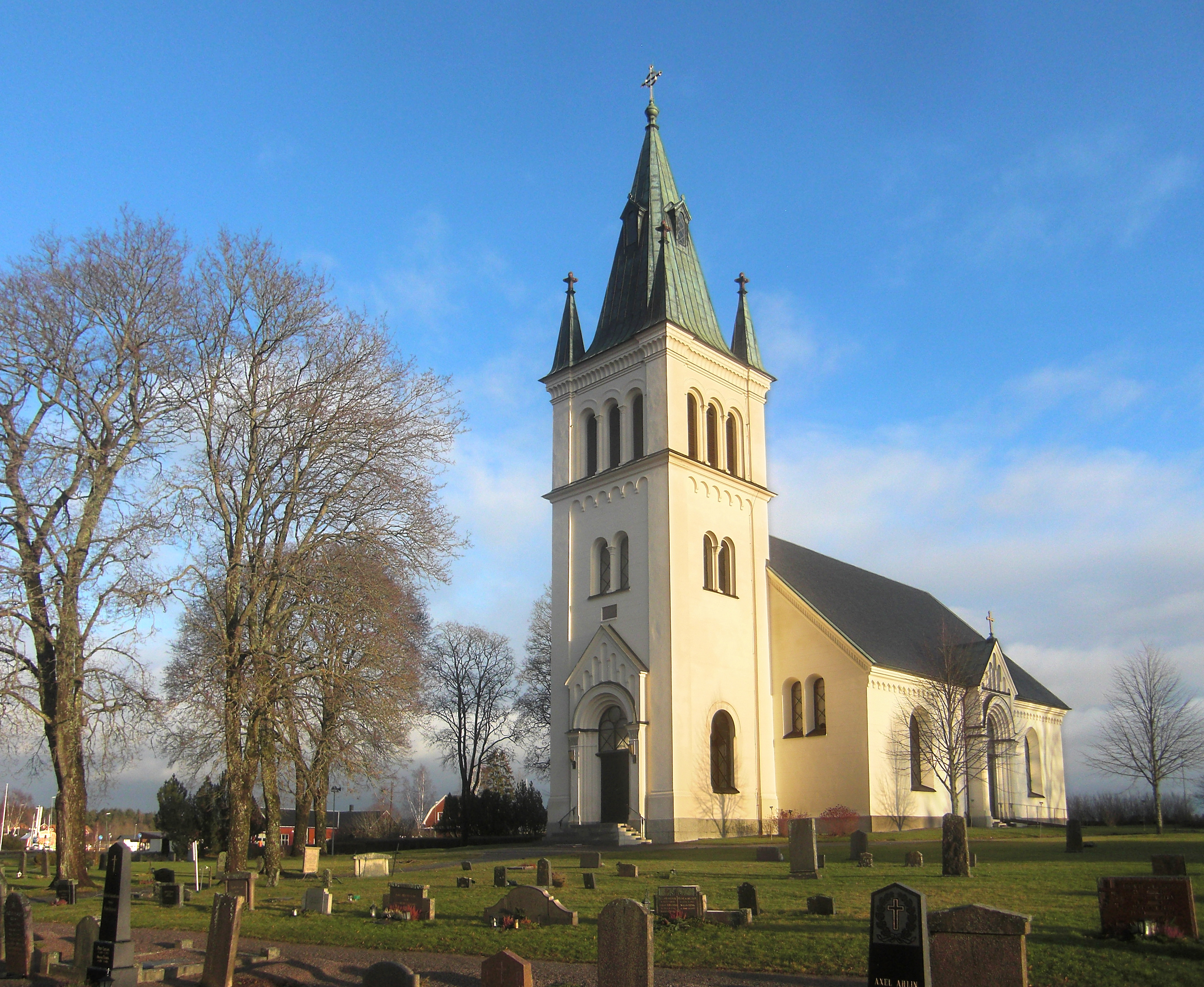
Norrbäck's nearest church, Norrby kyrka

There are no amenities in Norrbäck itself; the nearest are found in Sala.

The nearest church is Norrby kyrka, about three miles (4.8 km) to the north-west.

The few school-age children that live in Norrbäck attend school in nearby Varmsätra, 2.5 miles (4.0 km) to the southeast.

The nearest golf course is Sala-Heby Golfklubb on the northern side of riksvägen (highways) 72/56. (Heby is actually in Uppsala County but the golf club is open to residents of both Västmanland County and Uppsala County.)

== Transportation ==
=== Road ===
Norrbäck is accessible from the northwest (via Norrby and Öja) from the combined highways 72 and 56 (Uppsalavägen), then länsväg (county road) 794; from the northeast on an unpaved road (via Isätra) by the same means; from the south (via Sörbäck) on highway 70; and from the east (indirectly) by Littersbovägen in Uppsala County.

=== Rail ===
Travel duration by train from Stockholm Central Station to Norrbäck's nearest station, Sala, varies by departure time and the tier of SJ train used. There are three high-speed services (SJ Snabbtåg) throughout the day: 03:36 (one change), 11:14 and 16:46. These take about 1 hour, 20 minutes. Similar-length SJ InterCity journeys depart at 06:14, 07:47, 09:44, 13:44, 15:47, 17:44 and 19:44.

Additionally, there are 23 SJ Regionaltåg and one SJ Tåg i Bergslagen options throughout the day. They each take around one hour and forty minutes (except the 11:40 and 21:12, which take about two hours and ten minutes, because the connecting mode of transport is a bus). They each make one stop — at either Uppsala Central Station or Västerås Central Station — except for the 22:14 SJ Tåg i Bergslagen, which is direct to Sala.

=== Bus ===
The number 66 bus, part of the Silverlinjen (Silver Line) run by VL, makes four daily (except Sunday) stops at Södra Kumlaby, which is a 15-minute walk from Norrbäck. The times are 07:10, 08:10, 12:10, 14:10 and 16:10. Boarding at Sala station, the eight stops (fifteen minutes) before Södra Kumlaby are Fiskartorget, Ekebygatan, Fredstorget, Fabriksgatan, Norrby Prästgård, Sörby (Varmsätra), Öja and Norra Kumlaby (Varmsätra).
