= Sagån =

Sagån River
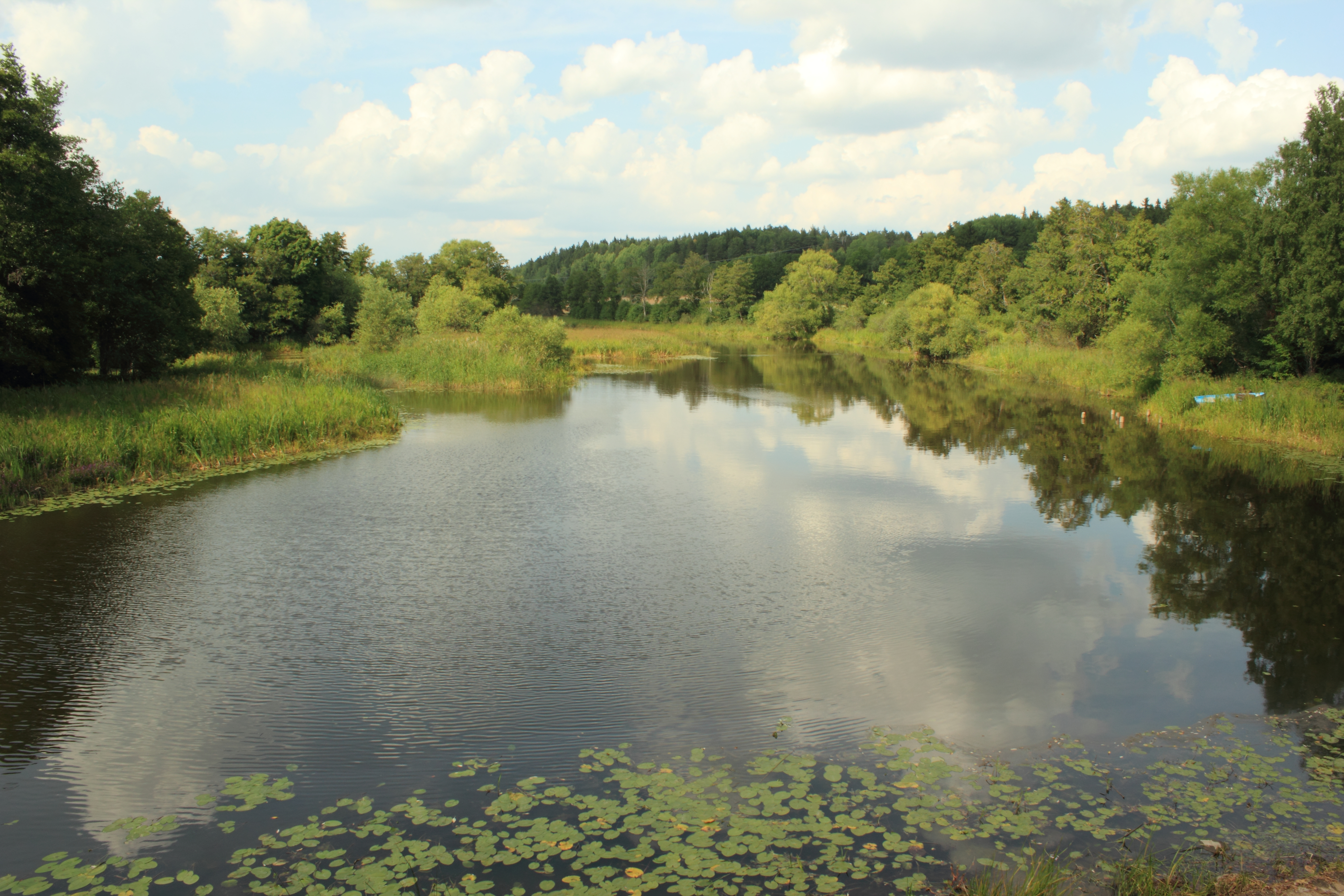
- The river in Nykvarn, Västmanland County

Location
- Country: Sweden

Physical characteristics
- Source: Doften
  - location: Heby Municipality
  - coordinates: 60.02018531°N 16.7619969°E
- Mouth: Mälaren
  - location: Svealand
  - coordinates: 59.57435449°N 16.91071°E
- Length: 70 km (43 mi)

The Sagån is a river in Sweden. 70 kilometres (43 mi) in length, it flows south through the municipalities of Enköping, Västerås and Sala. Its source is Doften, a lake in Heby Municipality. It flows south into Mälaren (Lake Malar), Svealand, the third-largest freshwater lake in Sweden. Its tributaries are Lillån (past Björksta and Tortuna), Isätrabäcken and Lillån (through Sala).

Historically, the river marked the boundary between the provinces of Uppland and Västmanland (the western boundary of the province of Uppland).

Norrby Church, located immediately to the east of Sala, stands on the eastern banks of the river.

Brooches were discovered in a 9th-century Viking boat burial on the river's Brytilsholmen Island in 1901.
