= ABB Industrigymnasium =

ABB-gymnasiet
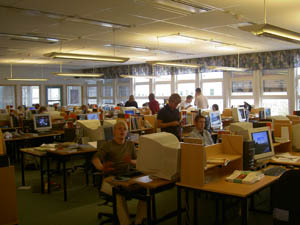

Location
- Västerås, Västmanland; Sweden; Västerås: 59°38′16.8″N 16°35′09.6″E

Information
- School type: Upper secondary education
- Opened: 1994
- Chairperson: Inga Näslund
- Rector: Hans Jakobsson
- Head of school: Fredrik Svensson
- Grades: 10-12
- Colours: Red, black
- Website: abbgymnasiet.se

ABB-gymnasiet is the name of three schools in Västerås, Sala and Ludvika, Sweden, secondary schools with a focus on engineering, information technology and enterprising. The Västerås branch was started in 1994 by the industrial corporation ABB, which were merged in 1987 from the Swiss Brown Boveri Corporation and the Swedish ASEA, which is headquartered in Västerås. The Ludvika school was founded by ABB in 1995.

More recently, in September 2021, the school in Västerås adopted the name ABB-gymnasiet, while the Ludvika school became known as Hitachigymnasiet. By September 2023, the ABB-gymnasiet in Västerås also changed its name to Hitachigymnasiet.
