= Kumla Church, Västmanland =

Kumla Church
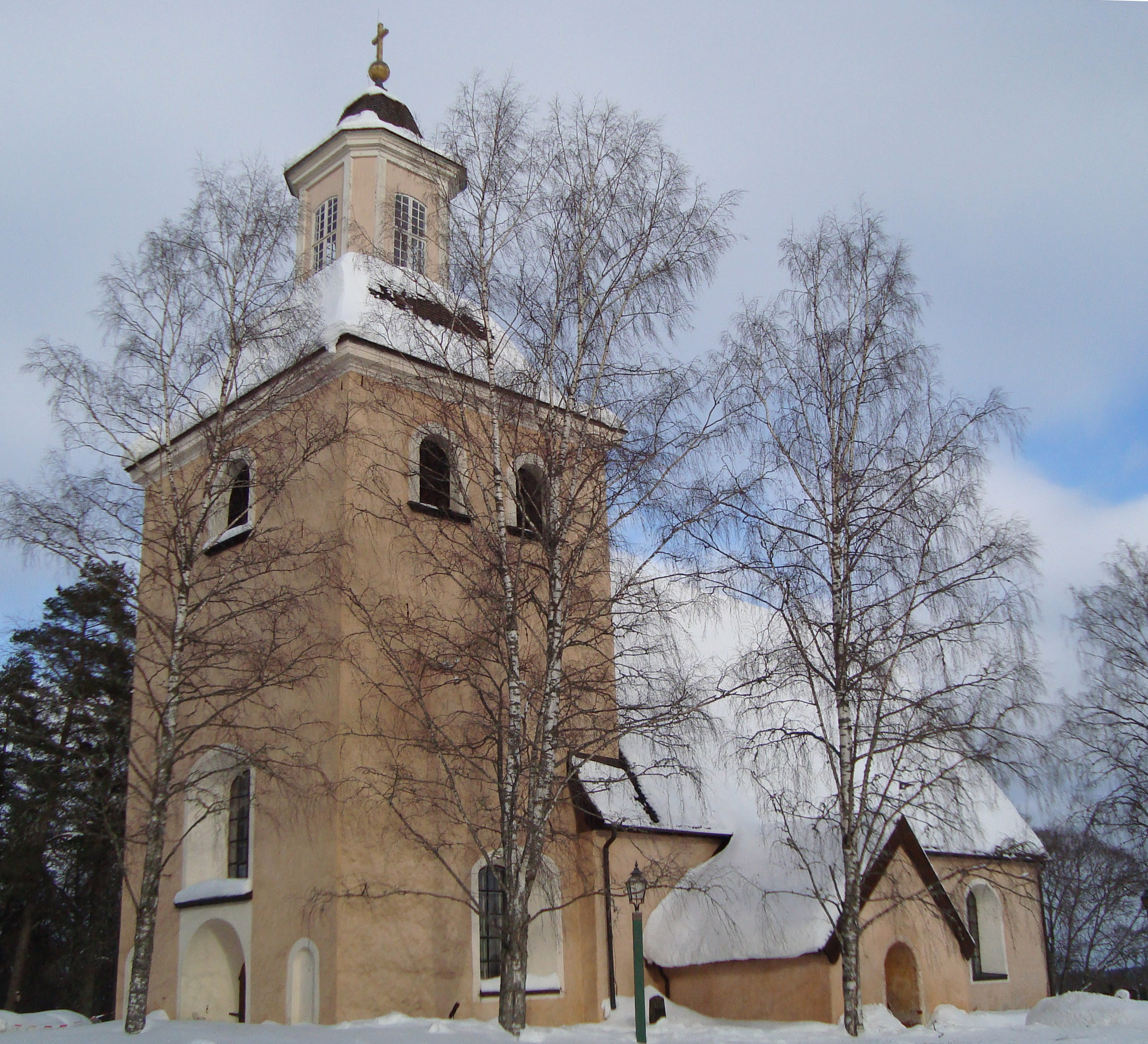
- View from the west
- Kumla Church
- 59°50′44″N 16°38′15″E
- Location: Norrby
- Country: Sweden

History
- Consecrated: c. 1300

Kumla Church (Swedish: Kumla kyrka) is located in Kumla kyrkby in Sala Municipality in Västmanland, Sweden.

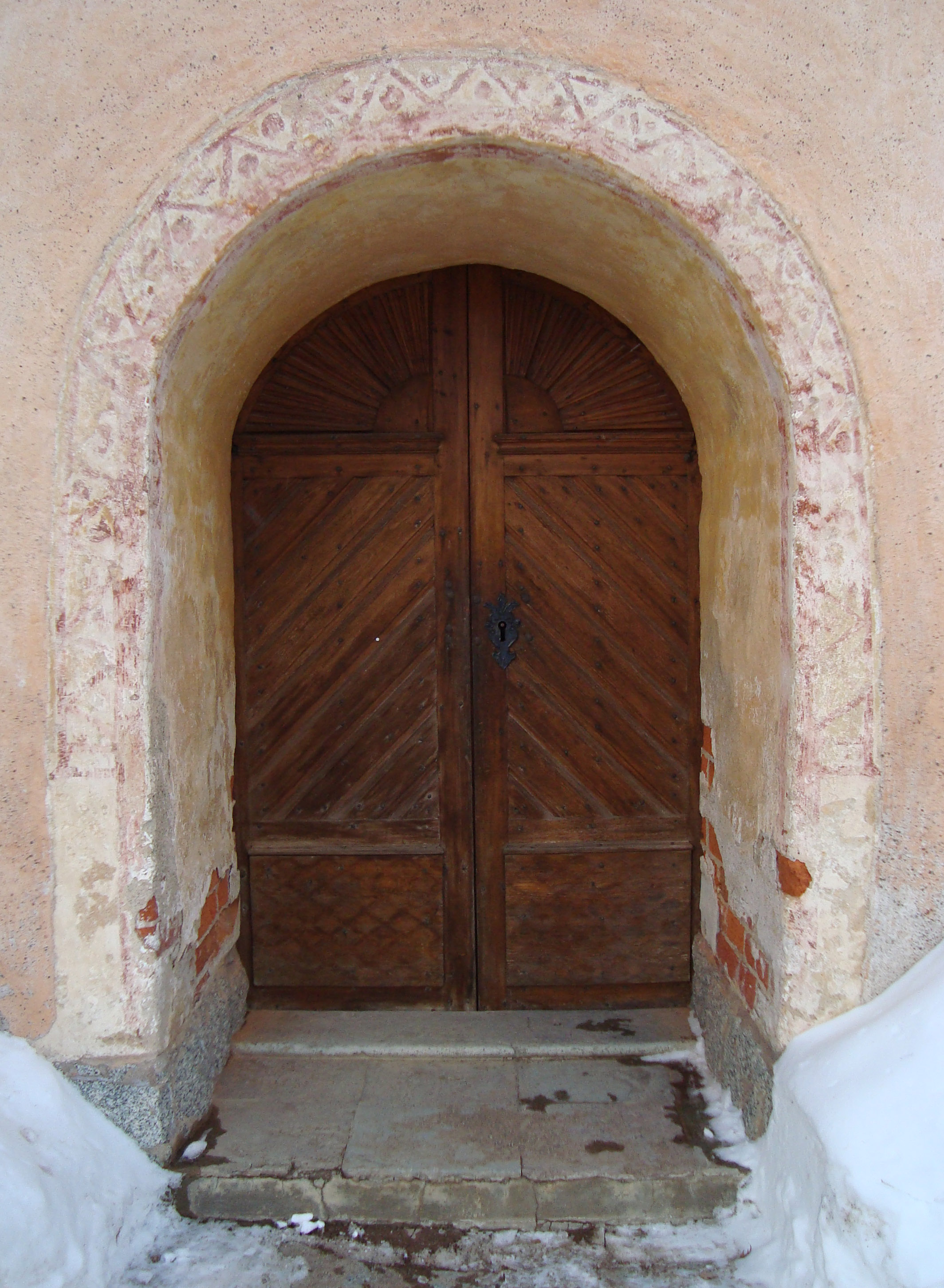
The southern entrance

== History ==
The church, which is constructed of fieldstone, was built around 1300 and included a longhouse and a small bell tower. At the end of the 15th century, the wood roof was replaced by a brick star vault with church wall paintings signed by Albertus Pictor. In the 18th century, the windows were made larger and the current bell tower was built.

== Features ==
The pulpit with six-sided basket was added in 1665. The baptismal font, made of Scottish sandstone by sculptor Erik Sand, was completed in 1951.
