= Salbohedskolan =

School located in the northeastern part of Västmanland

Salboheds Gymnasiesärskola is a special education school located in the northeastern part of Västmanland (15 km west of Sala). The school was founded in 1922 and has during the years been driven by several owners. In 2015 Sala municipal took over the ownership from "AB Salboheds Gymnasiesärskola".
