= Stortorget (disambiguation) =

Stortorget is a public square in Gamla Stan, the old town in central Stockholm, Sweden.

Stortorget may also refer to:

- Gustaf Adolfs torg, Gothenburg, a town square in central Gothenburg, Sweden
- Stortorget, Kalmar, the main square in Kalmar, Sweden
- Stortorget, Karlskrona, the largest square in Karlskrona, Sweden
- A square in Malmö, Sweden

== See also ==
- Stora torget (Sala), the main square in Sala, Sweden
- Stortorvet, Oslo, Norway
- Old Great Square (Turku) (Swedish: Gamla Stortorget), in Turku, Finland
