= Gustaf Dahl =

Swedish architect (1835–1927)

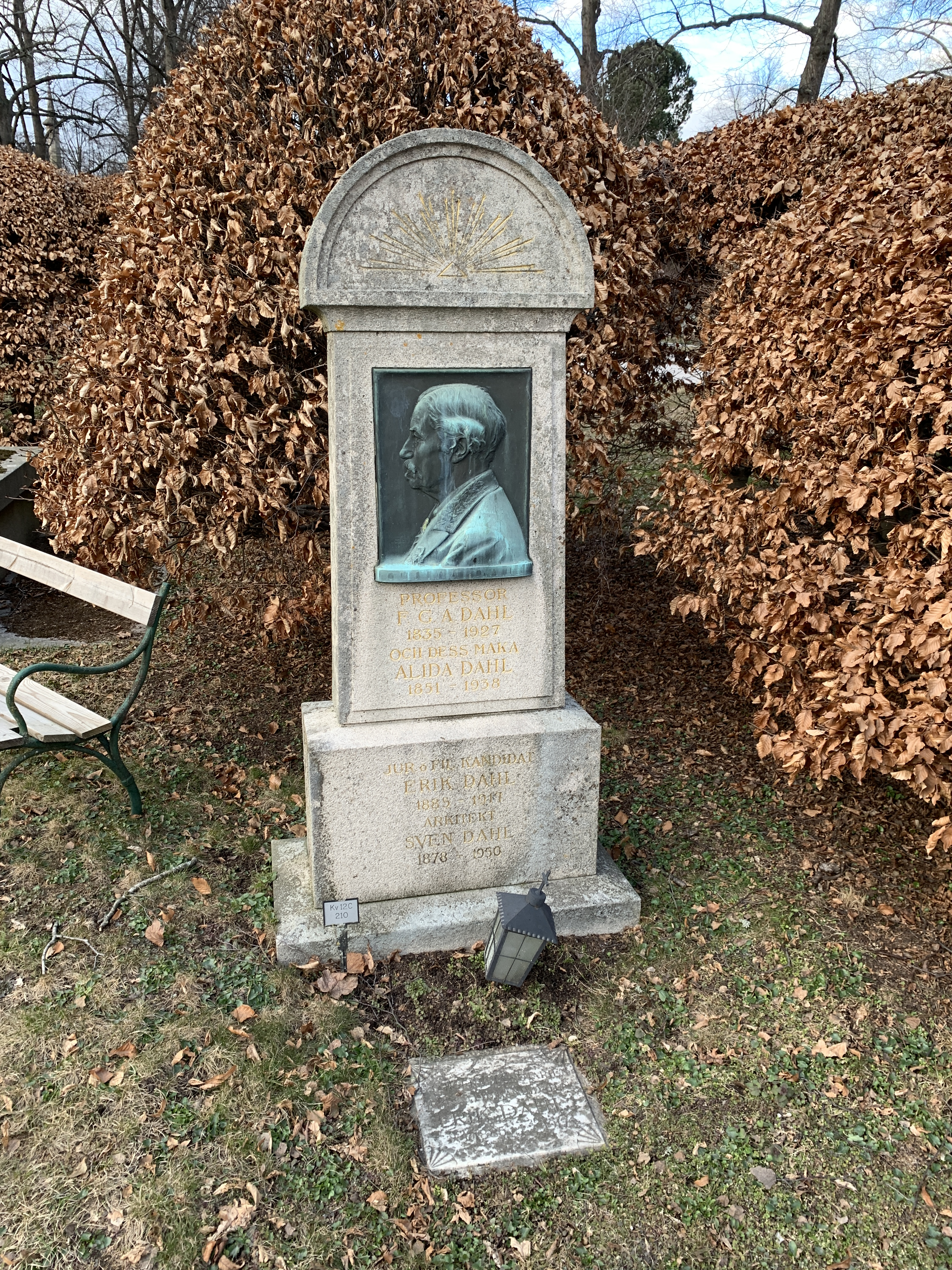
- Dahl's grave in Norra Begravningsplatsen
- Born: 13 February 1835; Stockholm, Sweden
- Died: 21 September 1927 (aged 92); Stockholm, Sweden
- Occupation: Architect

Frans Gustaf Abraham Dahl (13 February 1835 – 21 September 1927) was a Swedish architect. He is known for designing several of Sweden's prominent buildings, including Stockholm's National Library of Sweden and Mariahissen.

He also designed Norrby Church in Sala Municipality.

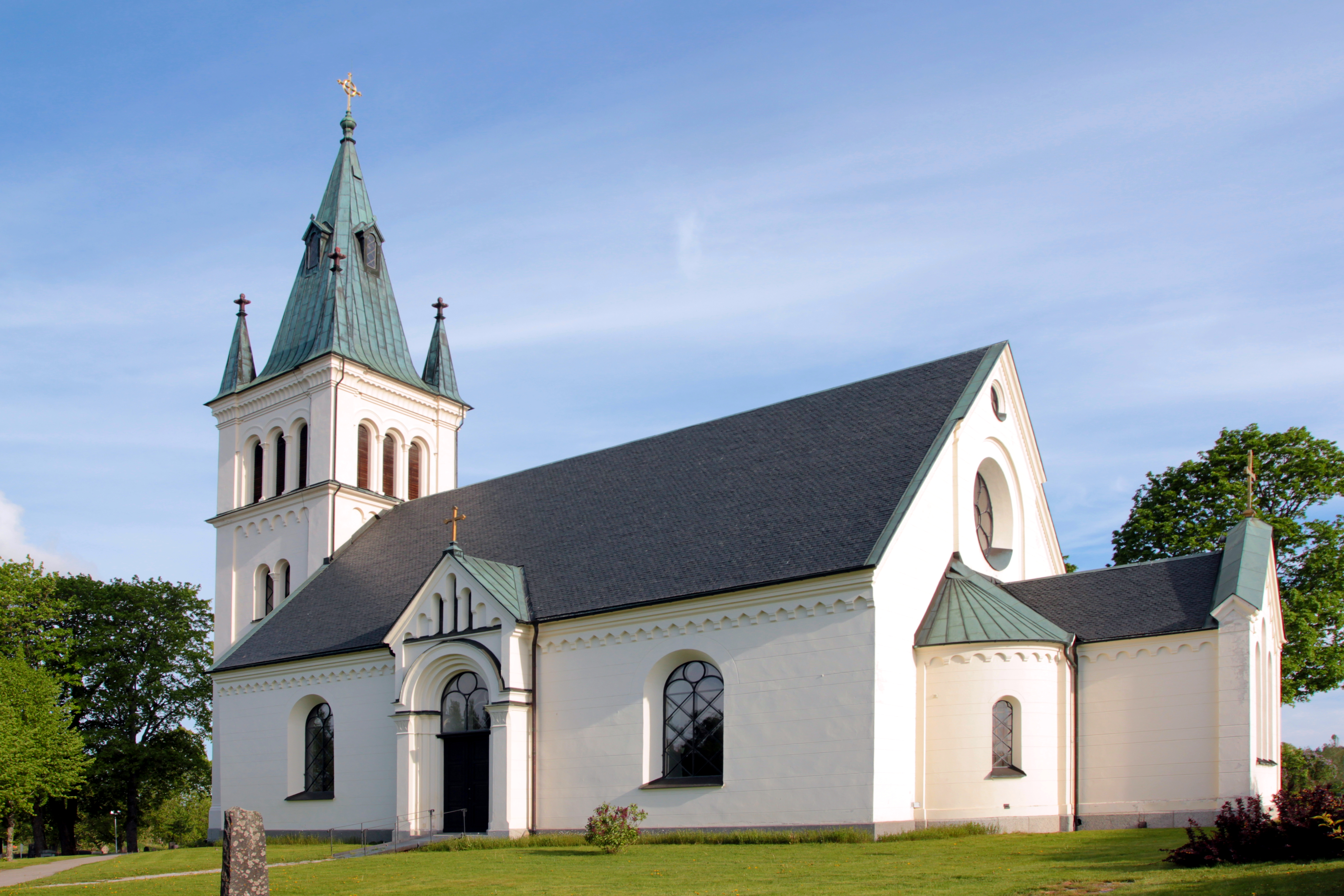
Norrby Church

== Personal life ==
Dahl had two known children: fellow architect Theodor Dahl (father of author Tora Dahl) and Elsa Åkerhielm.

He was a cousin of composer Viking Dahl.

== Death ==
Dahl died in 1927, aged 92. He was interred in Norra begravningsplatsen.
