= Swedish National Archive of Recorded Sound and Moving Images =

The Swedish National Archive of Recorded Sound and Moving Images, in Swedish Statens ljud- och bildarkiv, SLBA, was founded in 1979 (originally having the name Arkivet för ljud och bild, ALB) with the aim of collecting and preserving all film and recorded sound produced in Sweden, including radio and television programs. The archive was an independent institution under the Ministry of Education, Research and Culture (utbildnings - och kulturdepartementet). It was located in Stockholm and employed 65 people. The last director general was Sven Allerstrand.

A national deposit law requires publishers to submit a copy of all new titles to the archive. The older collections are gradually built from donations and acquisitions, but suffer from the institution's youth. Other major sound and film archives in Sweden exist among private collectors and the public service broadcasting companies, Sveriges Radio, Sveriges Television and Utbildningsradion.

In April 2008, the Government directed the National Library of Sweden to investigate and prepare for a merger between SLBA and the library by January 1, 2009.

== Migration ==
A government investigation, Preserving sound and moving images, concluded in 2004 that the cost would be close to SEK 900 million to digitize the entire SLBA archives with nearly six million recorded hours.

SLBA performed a mass-digitizing on parts of its collections, primarily focusing on public service material. Over a three-year period, an initial selection of 1.5 million hours of material were to be digitized and made available to researchers.

Most of the digitization process was automated. At full speed, 200 tapes per day, or 2,800 hours, were digitized by a staff of just five people. A number of relatively unconventional methods were being used, including the high-speed transfer of open-reel audiotapes, robotic automation of cassette-based audio and video transfer, and a suite of custom scripts that process the digitized files automatically.

The infrastructure includes a migration asset management system developed inhouse that handles such things as communication with production systems, logistics (of both original carriers and resultant files), and metadata input and transfer. Once the digitization process is completed, automatic functions create new carrier database records, insert metadata, direct the new archive and browsing files to their final mass storage locations, and link files to the MARC based database for direct access.
