= Norrby Church =

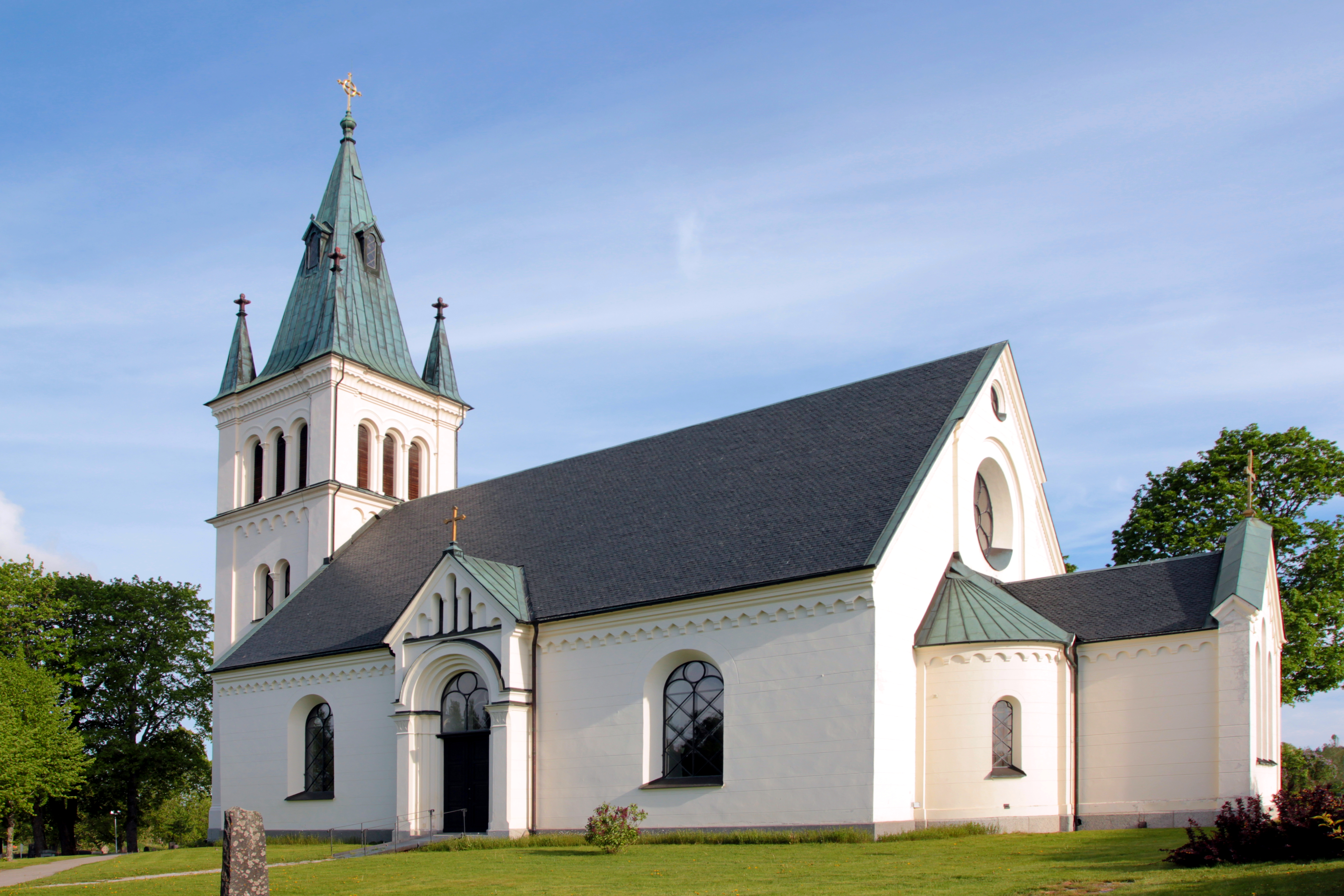
- Southern façade
- Norrby Church
- 59°54′53.1″N 16°37′38.8″E
- Location: Norrby
- Country: Sweden
- Denomination: Church of Sweden
- Website: www.svenskakyrkan.se

History
- Consecrated: c. 1300, 1887

Architecture
- Architect: Gustaf Dahl
- Style: Romanesque Revival

Administration
- Province: Sala Municipality
- Diocese: Västerås

Norrby Church (Swedish: Norrby kyrka) is located in Sala Municipality in Västmanland County, Sweden. The church is situated on the eastern banks of the Sagån River. Norrby parish is in the Diocese of Västerås of the Church of Sweden.

== The church building ==
Norrby Church has medieval origins but was rebuilt to its current form at the end of the 1800s. The church building has a frame of stone and consists of three naves. On the west side of the main nave is the church tower with entrance.

== Creation and refurbishment ==
The original stone church was probably built around the year 1300. In the 1500s the church was expanded to the north. During the 1600s and 1700s, there were repeated strengthening efforts to stabilise the arches and porch. In 1741 a new arched roof was built, and at the same time the church floor was paved. 1785 saw a major renovation and extension under the direction of master mason Johan Sundberg. The southern porch was demolished and the north wall was raised to the same level as in the south. The old roof was demolished and a new roof with heavier trusses were built. Meanwhile, enlarged window openings and the foundation of the church tower was added. New trail shutters were built in the cemetery wall's southern and eastern sides.

== Rebuilding the current appearance ==
In 1887 a major renovation was conducted, designed by architect Gustaf Dahl (1835-1927), when the church was remodeled to the neo-Romanesque style. The renovation meant that the exterior walls were built on. Also, the original tower from the 1700s was completed. The church was extended to the east. The nave was given a new tall roof covered with slate. Old arches were demolished and instead divided the church into three naves with cast iron pillars. The arched roof is built of wood.

== Renovations in the 1900s ==
1937 saw an internal rebuilding effort by architect Viktor Segerstedt (1878-1963). Existing tiled floor with the base floor was removed. The current floor of hard-baked bricks were put down. The round chancel window was fitted with a stained-glass window made of glass by artist John Österlund (1875-1953). The restoration was carried out in 1960 under the direction of the palace architect Ragnar Jonsson (1918-2001). The church's western section was rebuilt and the current benches were installed. A mural above the altarpiece was created by conservators Gösta Lindström (1905-1989).

== Features ==
The baptismal font of stone is from the Middle Ages and possibly as old as the original church. The altar in Rococo ornamental style was made in 1752 by Magnus Granlund. The altar is gilded. The pulpit was carved in 1647 by master Lars predikstolsmakare. In 1758 its original colours were gilded to match the altarpiece. The present organ, with fifteen voices, was added in 1960 and replaced an organ from the 1600s.

== Graveyard ==
The main part of the church's graveyard is on its western side.

== Gallery ==
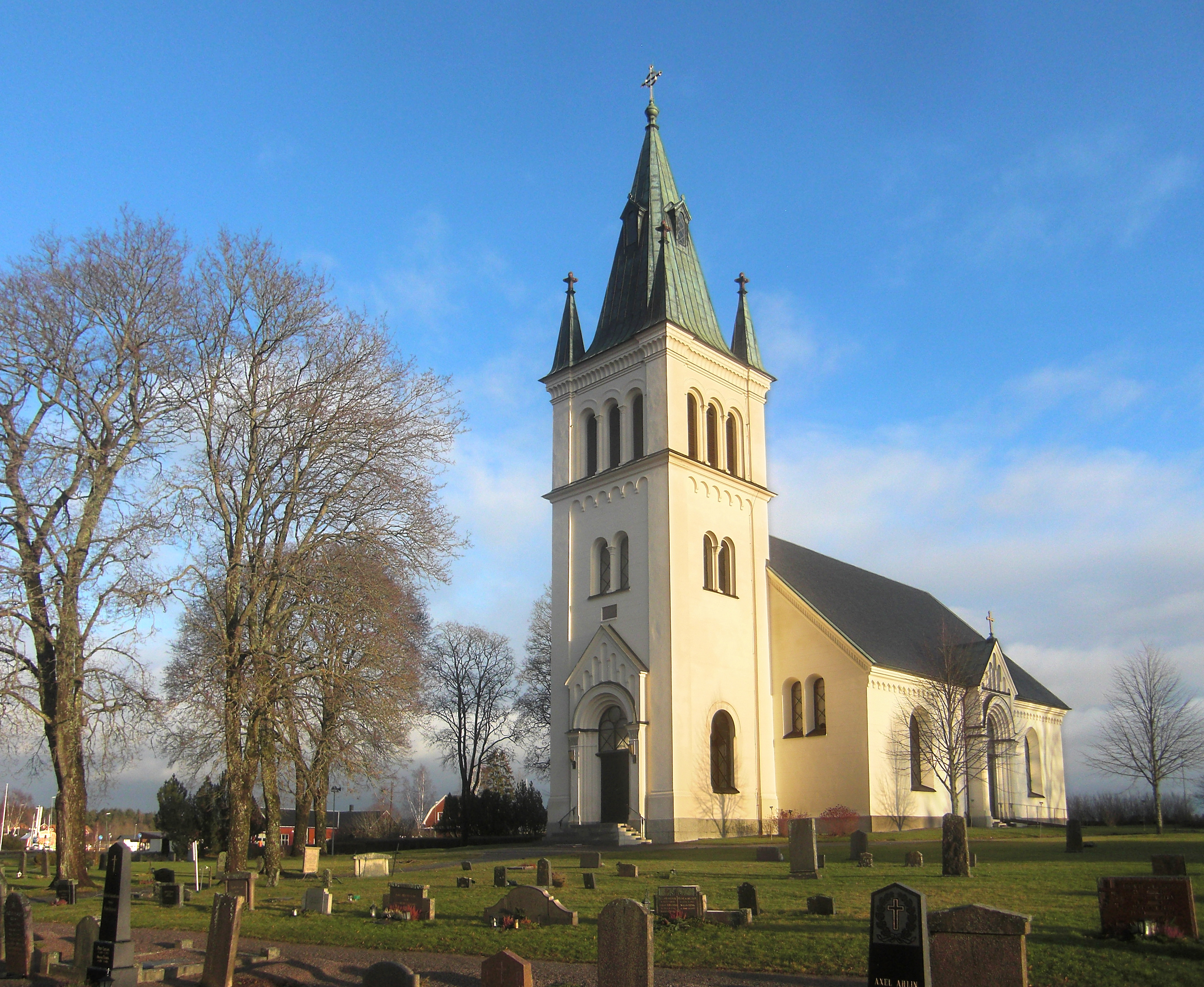
Southeastern façade

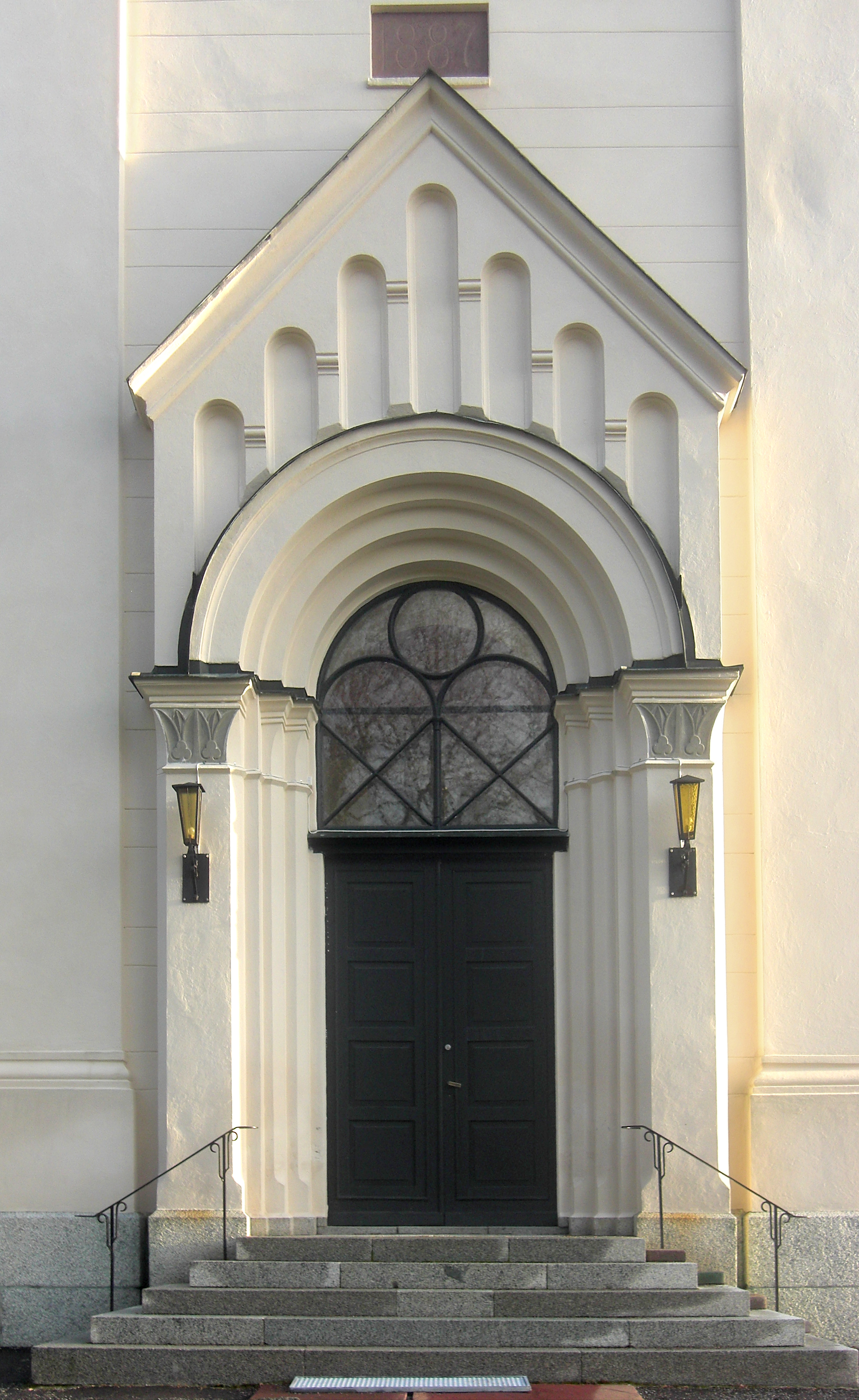
Western entrance

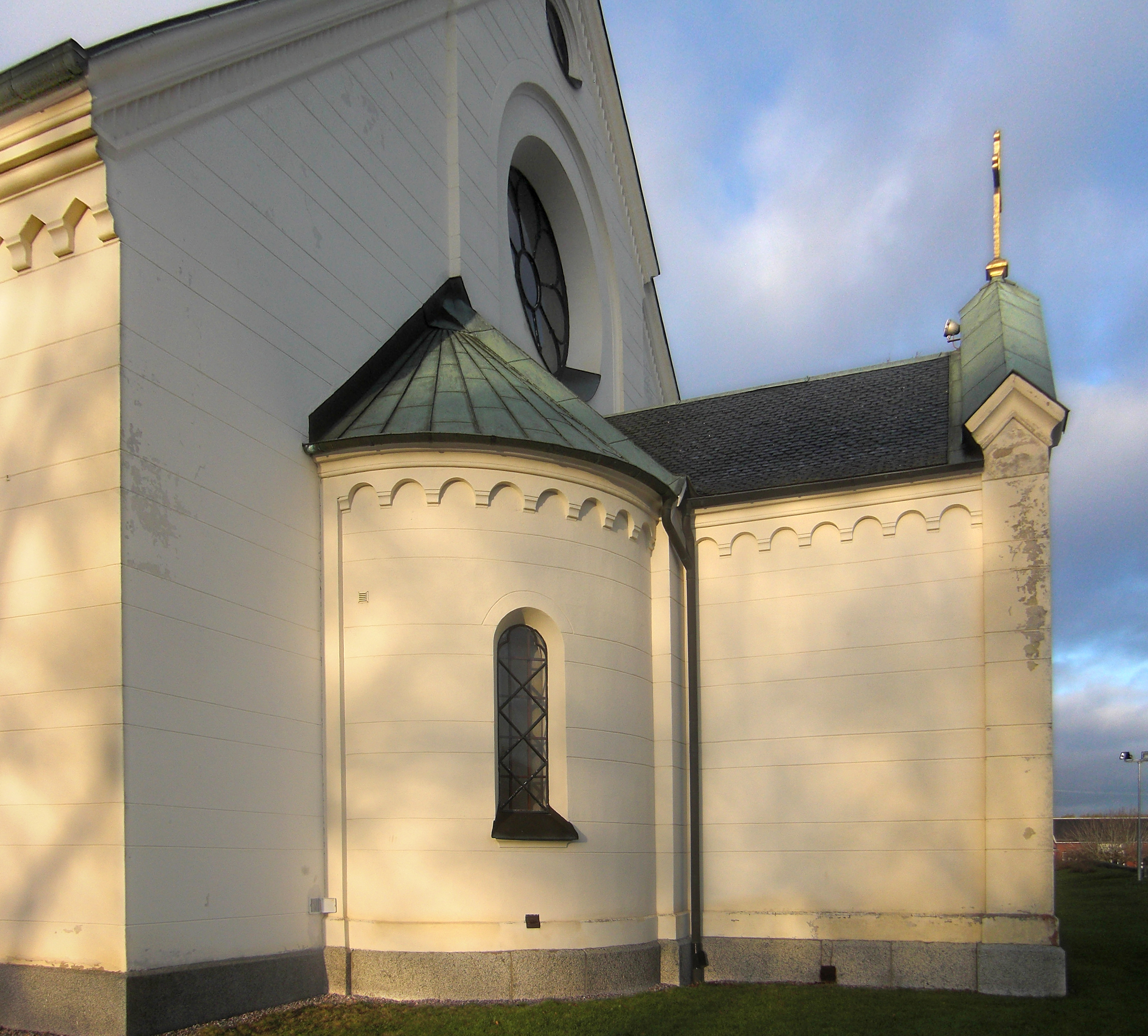
Eastern end

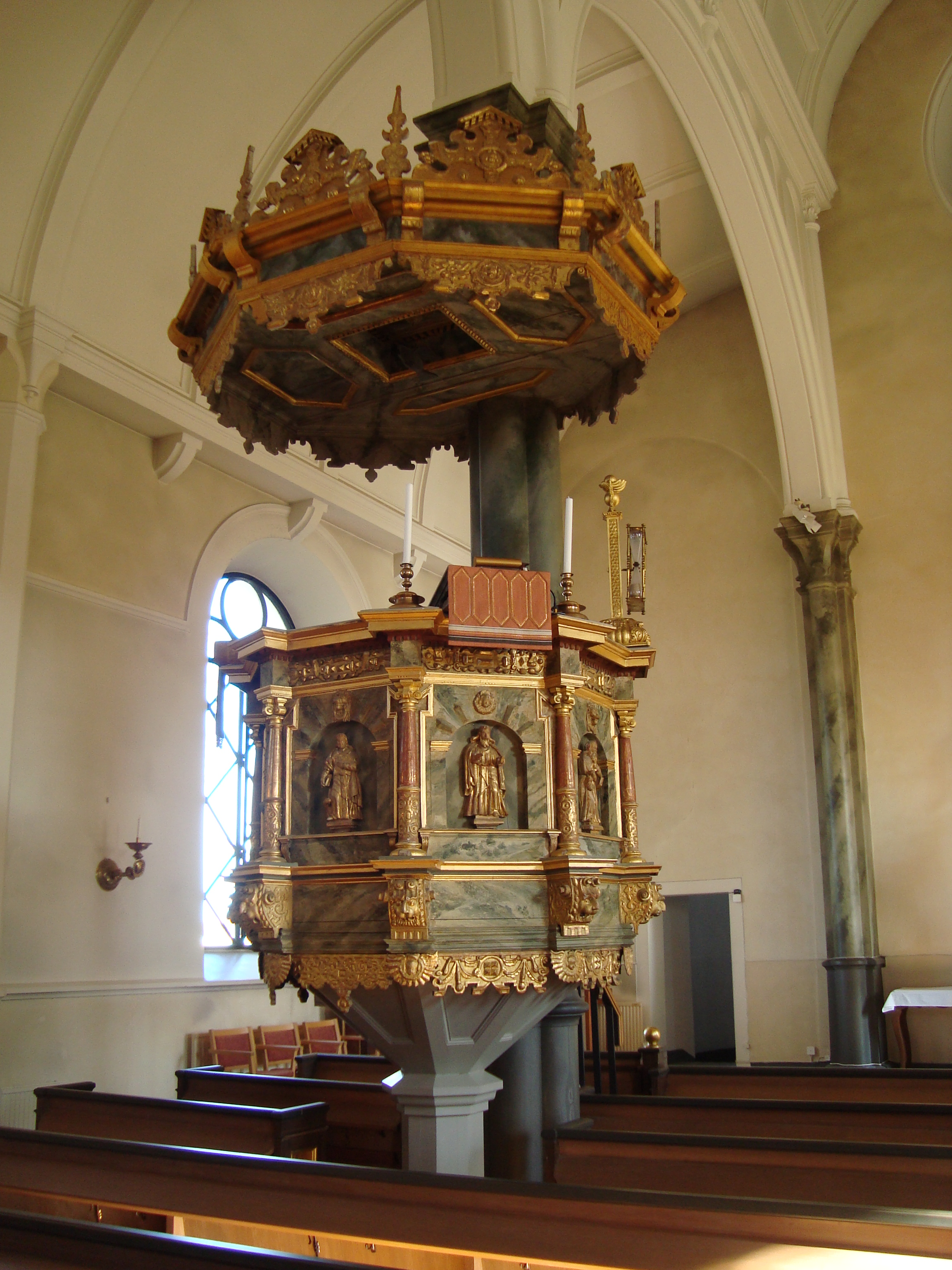
Pulpit

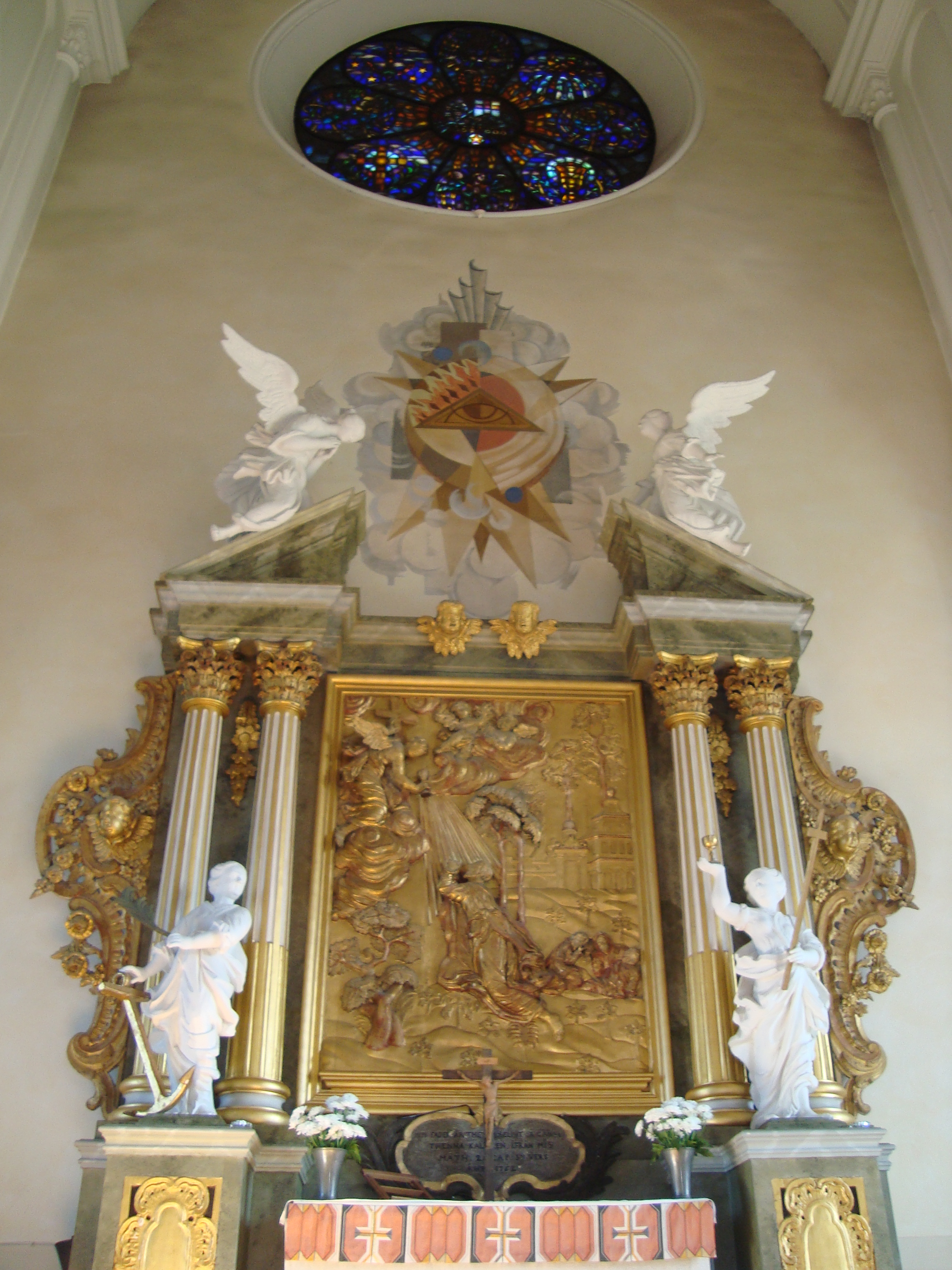
Altarpiece and the chancel windows

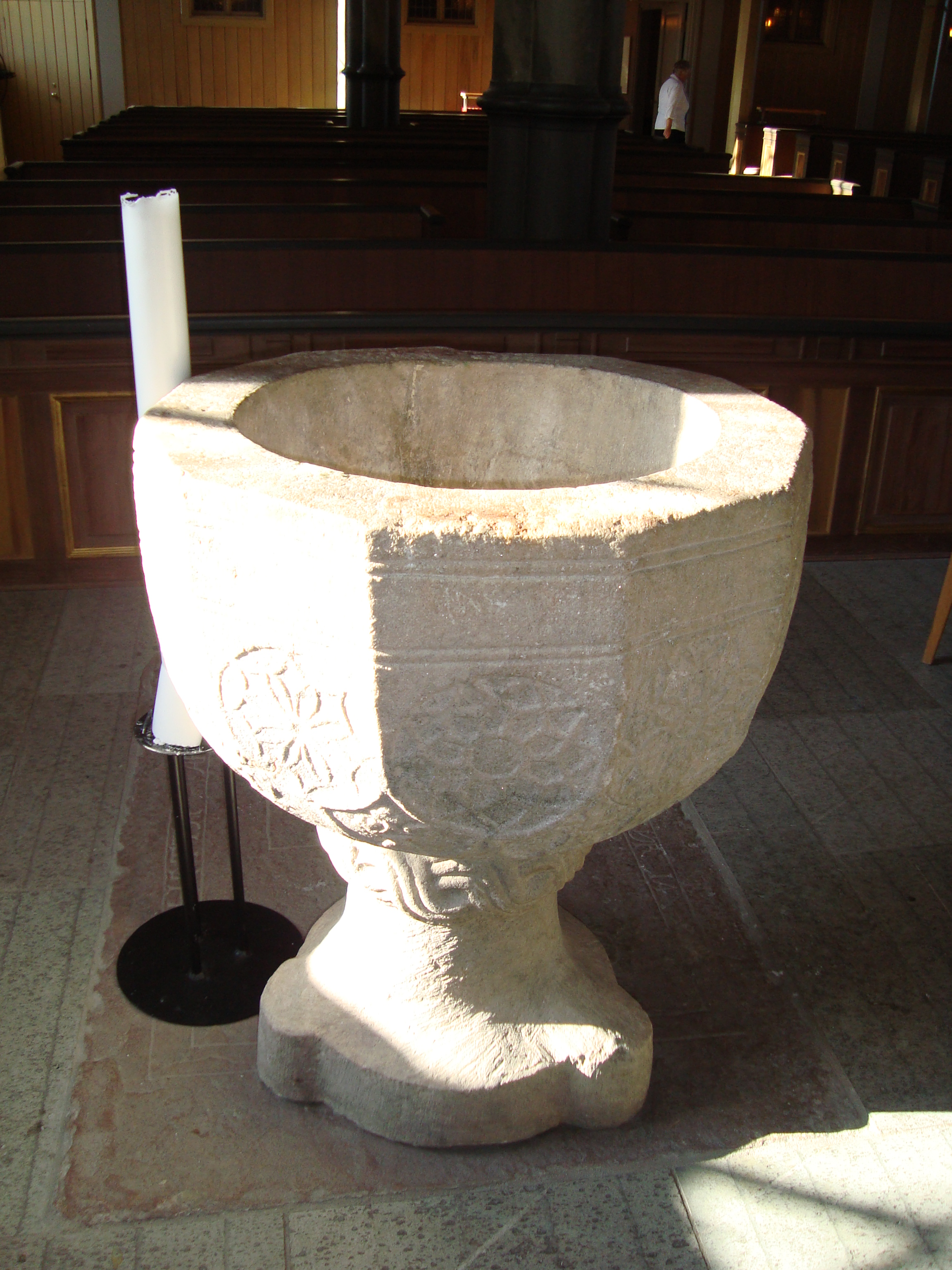
Baptismal font

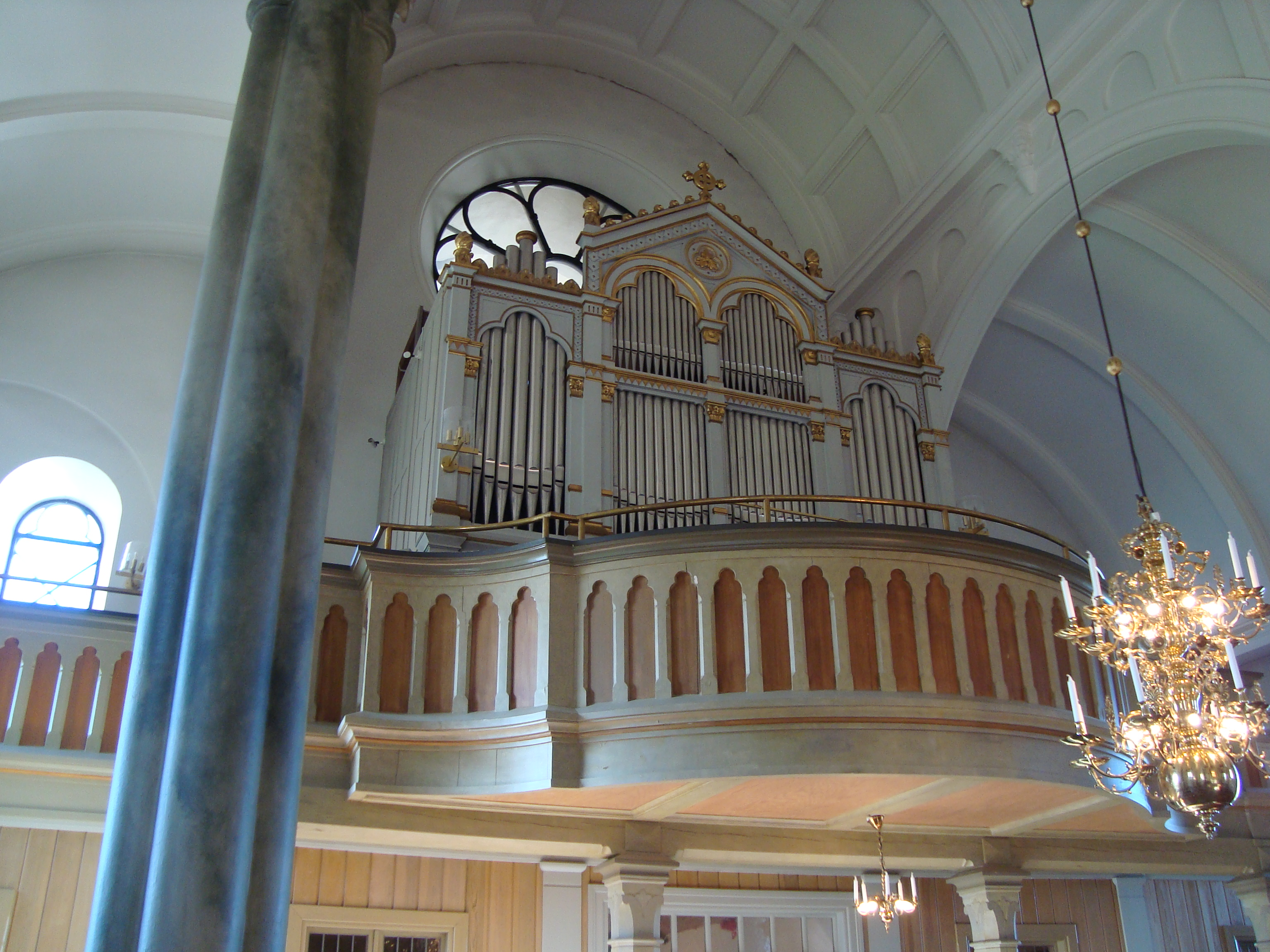
Organ gallery, located at the church's eastern end

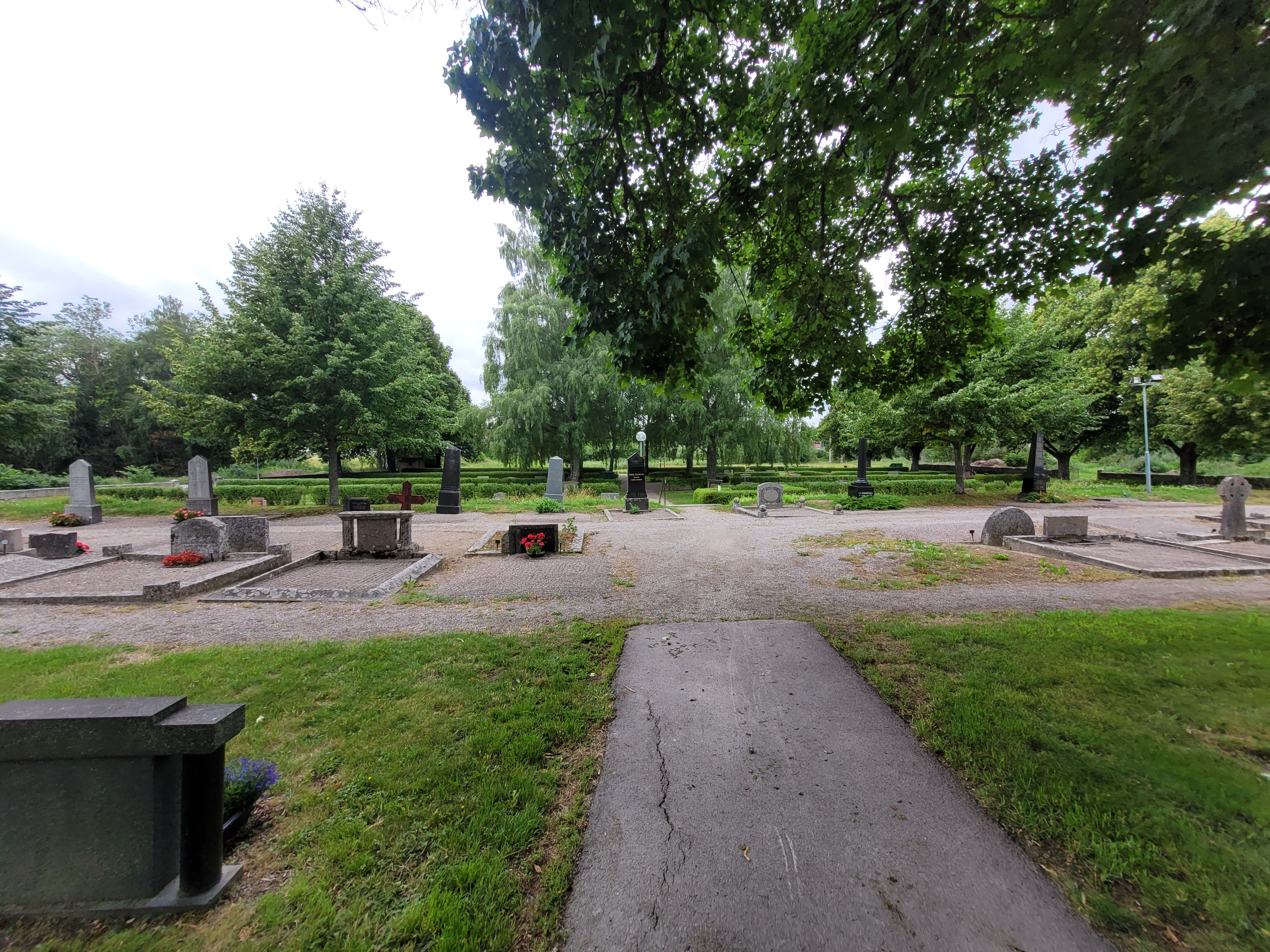
Graveyard
