= Salbohed =

- Location within Västmanland Location within Sweden
- Coordinates: 59°55′N 16°21′E
- Country: Sweden
- Province: Västmanland
- County: Västmanland County
- Municipality: Sala Municipality

Area
  - Total: 0.75 km^{2} (0.29 sq mi)

Population (31 December 2010)
  - Total: 259
  - Density: 344/km^{2} (890/sq mi)
- Time zone: UTC+1 (CET)
  - Summer (DST): UTC+2 (CEST)

Salbohed is a locality situated in Sala Municipality, Västmanland County, Sweden with 259 inhabitants in 2010.

== See also ==
- Gussjön
