= 1936 Långforssjöloppet =

Race details
- Date: 9 February 1936
- Official name: I Långforssjöloppet
- Location: Långforssjön, Sala
- Course: Ice circuit
- Course length: 15 km (9.320 miles)
- Distance: 1 lap, 15 km (9.320 miles)

Podium
First	(Sweden) Per-Viktor Widengren	Alfa Romeo
Second	(Sweden) Helmer Carlsson	Bugatti
Third	(Sweden) Karl-Gustav Sundstedt	Bugatti

The 1936 Långforssjöloppet was a Grand Prix motor race held on 9 February 1936. This race was part of the 1936 Grand Prix season as a non-championship race. The race was won by Swedish driver Per-Viktor Widengren in his Alfa Romeo 8C 2300.

== Results ==
Pos	Driver	Constructor	Laps	Time/Retired
1	(Sweden) Per-Viktor Widengren	Alfa Romeo	1	9'54.9
2	(Sweden) Helmer Carlsson	Bugatti	1	10'11.0
3	(Sweden) Karl-Gustav Sundstedt	Bugatti	1	10'15.6
4	(Finland) Karl Ebb	Mercedes-Benz	1	10'16.9
5	(Sweden) Adolf Westerblom	Amilcar	1	10'25.2
6	(Sweden) Karl-Emil Rolander	Amilcar	1	10'20.0
Ret	(Norway) Eugen Bjørnstad	Alfa Romeo	0	Carburettor
Ret	(Finland) Emil Elo	Bugatti	0	-
