= National Library of Sweden =

Sweden's national library

- Kungliga biblioteket
- 59°20′17″N 018°04′20″E
- Location: Stockholm, Sweden
- Established: 1661 (365 years ago)
- Architect: Gustaf Dahl
- Reference to legal mandate: The Government Approval Document for The Swedish National Library (available in Swedish)

Collection
- Items collected: books, journals, newspapers, magazines, films, recorded sound, television, radio, manuscripts, maps, pictures, printed music, ephemera and digital resources
- Size: c. 18 million items, 175 shelf kilometres, and 15.7 million hours of audiovisual material
- Criteria for collection: Suecana: publications published, broadcast or recorded in Sweden or by Swedish originator or concerning Sweden
- Legal deposit: Yes, and agreements with publishers

Access and use
- Access requirements: Free. Registration for loans: be Swedish resident or citizen over 18. (Audiovisual may only be accessed for research purposes)
- Circulation: 135,187 (2009)

Other information
- Budget: 394,000,000SEK (2017)
- Director: Karin Grönvall (since 2019)
- Employees: 340
- Website: www.kb.se

The National Library of Sweden (Swedish: Kungliga biblioteket, KB, meaning "the Royal Library") is Sweden's national library. It collects and preserves all domestic printed and audio-visual materials in Swedish, as well as content with Swedish association published abroad. Being a research library, it also has major collections of literature in other languages.

== Collections ==
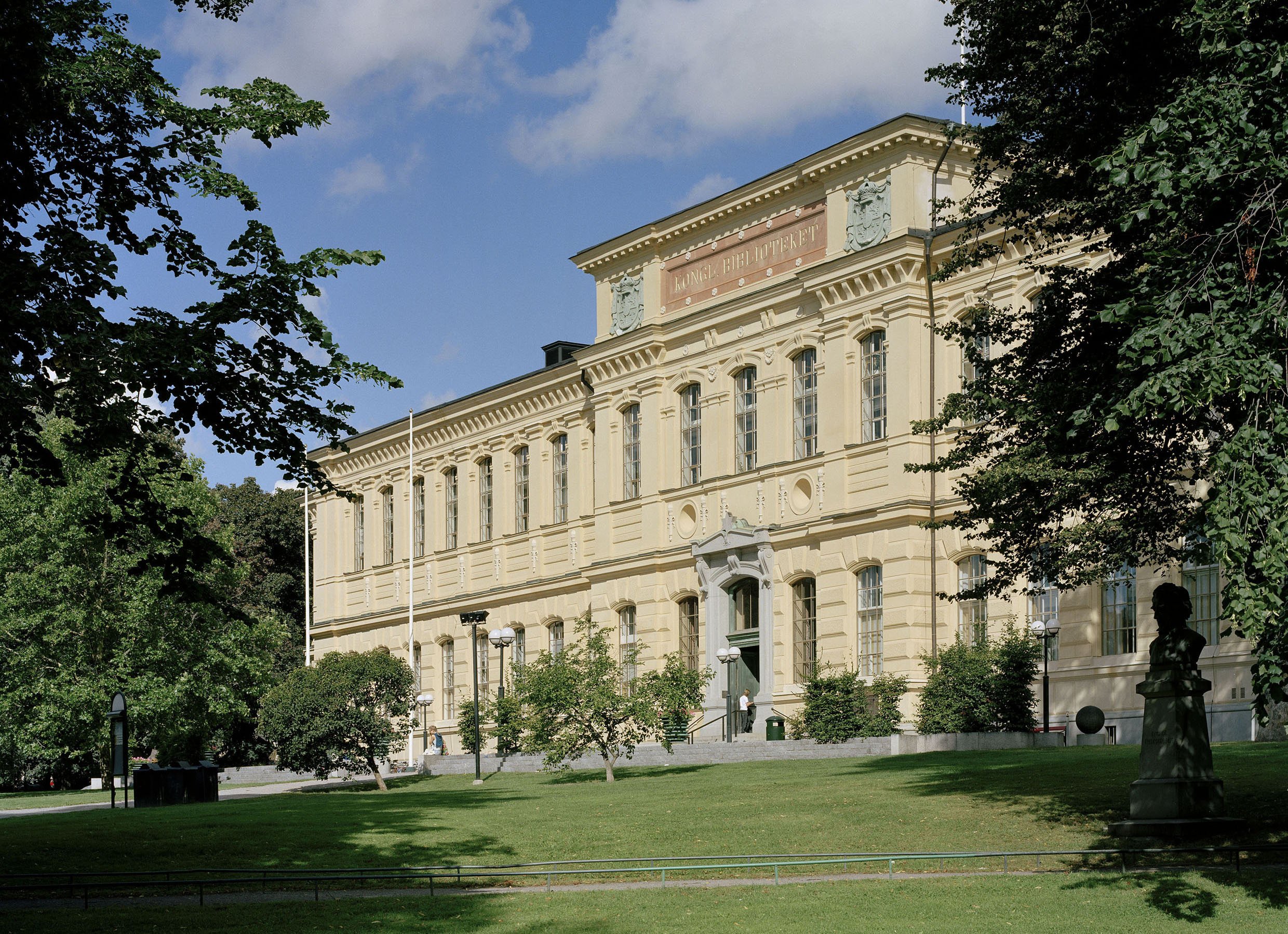
Main building in Humlegården park

The collections of the National Library consist of more than 18 million objects, including books, posters, pictures, manuscripts, and newspapers. The audio-visual collection consists of more than 10 million hours of recorded material.

The National Library is also a humanities research library, with collections of foreign literature in a wide range of subjects. The library holds a collection of 850 broadsides of Sweden dating from 1852.

The National Library also purchases literature about Sweden written in foreign languages and works by Swedes published abroad, a category known as suecana. The National Library has been collecting floppy disks, CD-ROMs, and other electronic storage media since the mid-1990s, along with e-books, e-journals, websites, and other digital material.

In 1953, the National Library purchased considerable amounts of Russian literature from Leningrad and Moscow. These books were to form the basis of a Slavonic library in Stockholm. These plans were consolidated in an agreement made in 1964 between the Lenin Library in Moscow and the National Library in which the respective libraries agreed to exchange their countries' literature.

== Legal deposit ==
According to the Swedish Legal Deposit Act publishers of printed material must send one copy of every object to the National Library and six other research libraries. Publishers of music, film, radio and TV must similarly submit copies to the library. In some cases only a sample of broadcast material has to be submitted.

In 2012, the Legal Deposit Act for Electronic Material was passed. It states that starting in 2013, publishing companies and public authorities must deliver digitally published content to the National Library.

=== History ===
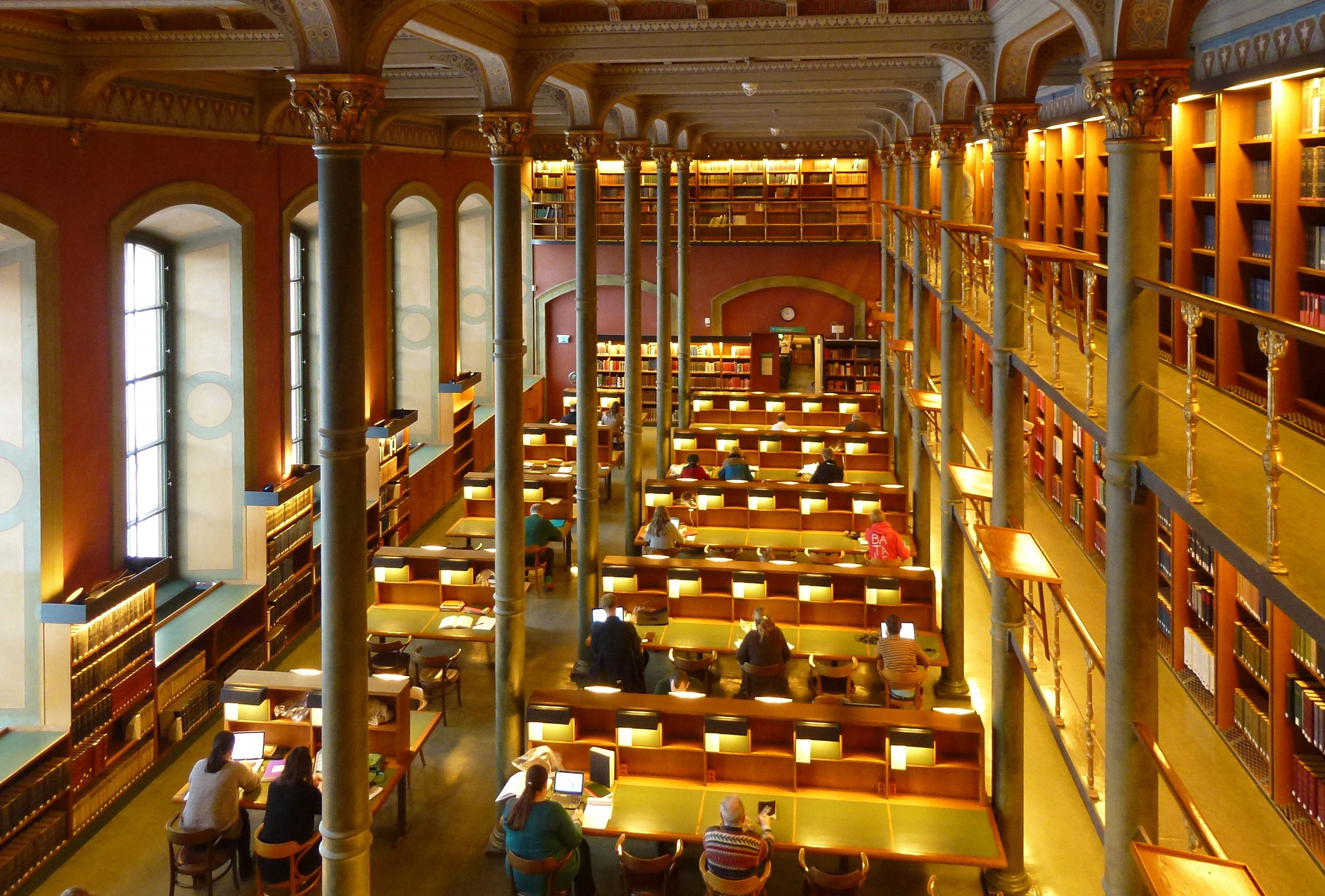
The main reading room

The obligation to collect all printed works in Swedish was laid down in 1661 in an ordinance from the Swedish Privy Council Chancery. The ordinance (legal deposit) ordered all printers in Sweden to send two copies of every publication printed to the Chancery before the material was distributed. One copy was to go to the Swedish National Archives (Riksarkivet), the other to the National Library. The motive for this provision stemmed not from a desire to preserve publications for posterity but from a desire to monitor their contents.

== Library cooperation ==
The library is responsible for coordinating all Swedish libraries, including public libraries.

The National Library is responsible for supplying information to higher education and research, which includes obtaining central license agreements for research and university libraries to increase access to various databases. The National Library developed and maintains LIBRIS, the national library database system. LIBRIS is freely available to the public via the Internet and contains more than five million titles held in 300 Swedish libraries. The Swedish ISBN Agency is a unit within the National Library. It is responsible for assigning ISBNs having Sweden's country prefix of 91- (and 978-91-).

The library is a partner of the World Digital Library.

== History ==
The roots of what we now know as the National Library go back to the days of King Gustav Vasa in the 16th century. The king collected books on a variety of subjects including history, science, and theology, as well as maps. The collections were expanded by Eric XIV, Johan III, and Charles IX and kept in the palace known as Tre Kronor (The Three Crowns). Some books were purchased abroad, while others were confiscated from Swedish monasteries dissolved in the Protestant Reformation. King Gustavus Adolphus gave away parts of the royal book collection in 1620: those books were the foundation of the Uppsala University Library.

The collection was also expanded through booty taken during the Thirty Years’ War. These captured treasures included the episcopal library of Würzburg in 1631, the University of Olomouc library in 1642, and the royal library of Prague in 1649. It was in this connection that the 13th-century “Devil's Bible” (the Codex Gigas) came to Stockholm. Queen Christina took much of this material with her to Rome after she abdicated the Swedish throne, but the royal collections continued to grow during the reign of Charles X Gustav through additional spoils of war and purchases abroad. The manuscript collection also includes the Anglo-Saxon Stockholm Codex Aureus.

Under the Chancery Decree of 1661, all book printers in Sweden were required by law to submit two copies of everything they printed – one copy for the National Archives and the other for the National Library. Rather than to acquire newly published literature for research purposes, the decree reflected the desire of a great power to exert state control and censorship.

Much of the library went up in flames during the Tre Kronor Palace fire of 1697 when 17,286 bound volumes and 1,103 manuscripts were lost. Only 6,700 volumes and 283 manuscripts survived. Thereafter, the books were stored temporarily in various noble palaces in Stockholm, first in Count Lillie's house on what was then Norrmalm Square (1697–1702), and later in the Bonde Palace (1702–1730), and Count Per Brahe's house on Helgeandsholmen (1730–1768). Finally, in 1768, the collections could be moved into the northeast wing of the new royal palace.

The collection grew further in its new home when the Antiquities Archive was dissolved in 1780 and most of the books kept there were transferred to the National Library. In 1792, Gustav III donated his private library of 14,500 works and four years later, Gustav IV Adolf donated 7,500 works. As a result, the National Library owned about 40,000 works by 1814.

Several large book collections, either donated or purchased, came to the National Library in the 19th century. Space was limited in the palace and a new home for the collections was required. In 1877, the National Library moved into new, dedicated premises in Humlegården. The library began installing electric lighting in 1887, but the library was not fully electrified until 1964.

=== Book thefts ===
In 2004, it was discovered that dozens of rare books from its collection had been stolen. The subsequent investigation revealed that the thief was Anders Burius, a senior librarian working at the National Library. At least 62 books were stolen and then auctioned off at a German auction house. The police investigation was closed in 2006 and reopened in 2014 upon appeal. The investigation closed after a year and a half with no books repatriated.

In 2011, the first book was returned to the library-an atlas by Cornelius Wytfliet. It had been bought by a map dealer in New York from a Sotheby's auction in 2003. Its value was estimated at $450,000. In 2015, some books were repatriated to Sweden by the U.S. Attorney's Office. In 2021, ten books were returned. As of 2025, 19 out of 62 stolen books have been returned. The library maintains a list of the missing books.

== The building ==
At first, the royal book collections were kept in the Royal Palace (Tre Kronor), which burned down in 1697. The National Library moved into its current building in Humlegården in December/January 1877/1878. The building was designed by Gustaf Dahl and built using cast iron. Two wings were added in 1926–27.

The National Library was reopened in spring 1997 after comprehensive remodeling and additions. Two large underground stacks, which were built into the bedrock below the building, now contain the bulk of the library's collections, while library patrons, other visitors, and employees share the space in the main building.

The new section, called the Annex, contains auditoriums, exhibition rooms, and a newspaper reading room. Many Swedish daily newspapers and a large number of foreign newspapers are available on microfilm and in a digital search tool in the Microfilm Reading Room.

== Organization ==
The National Library is a state agency that reports to the Ministry of Education and Research. Gunilla Herdenberg has been the National Librarian of Sweden since March 2012.

== Audiovisual media ==
Until 2009, the Swedish National Archive of Recorded Sound and Moving Images collected and archived audiovisual material. In 2009, the archive became a part of the National Library and ceased to be an independent institution.

== Digital collections ==
Beginning 24 March 1997, the National Library also archived the Swedish part of the World Wide Web as part of a project called kulturarw3 (a play on words; kulturarv is Swedish for cultural heritage). Initially, the contents were not available to the public due to copyright issues, but after 2004 visitors to the library could access the archive from dedicated read-only computers on library premises.

In 2010, mass digitization of Swedish newspapers began, and as of 2016, over 12 million pages had been processed.

In 2020, the library, along with the university libraries in Lund, Gothenburg, Stockholm, Uppsala, and Umeå, launched a project to digitize physical materials printed in Sweden.

== See also ==
- List of libraries in Sweden
- Open access in Sweden
