= Viking Dahl =

Swedish composer, painter and author

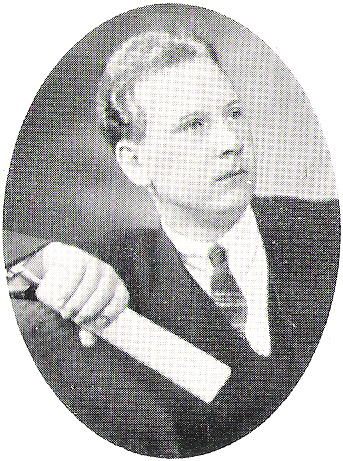
Frode Viking Samson Dahl

Viking Dahl (8 October 1895 – 5 January 1945) was a Swedish composer, active also as a painter and an author.

== Biography ==
Frode Viking Samson Dahl was born in Osby in Scania, Sweden. He was the son of Samuel Dahl (1847-1932) and Katarina Lovisa Peterson (1859-1931). He was the grandson of Swedish priest Gustav Leonard Dahl (1801-1877). His elder brother was Swedish-American Lutheran pastor and author K. G. William Dahl (1883-1917). His cousin was Swedish architect Frans Gustaf Abraham Dahl (1835-1927).

Dahl studied at the Royal College of Music 1915-1919 in Stockholm and thereafter in Copenhagen and Berlin. During a stay in Paris 1920, he wrote the dance drama Maison de Fous for Ballets Suédois. He developed his own avant-gardism during his studies in Stockholm, and in Paris he met the radical French composers of the time, among them Darius Milhaud and Maurice Ravel.

When he returned to Sweden, Dahl worked as a piano and music teacher. He was also an organist and choir director at Varberg in Halland where he lived until his death.
