= Kumla kyrkby =

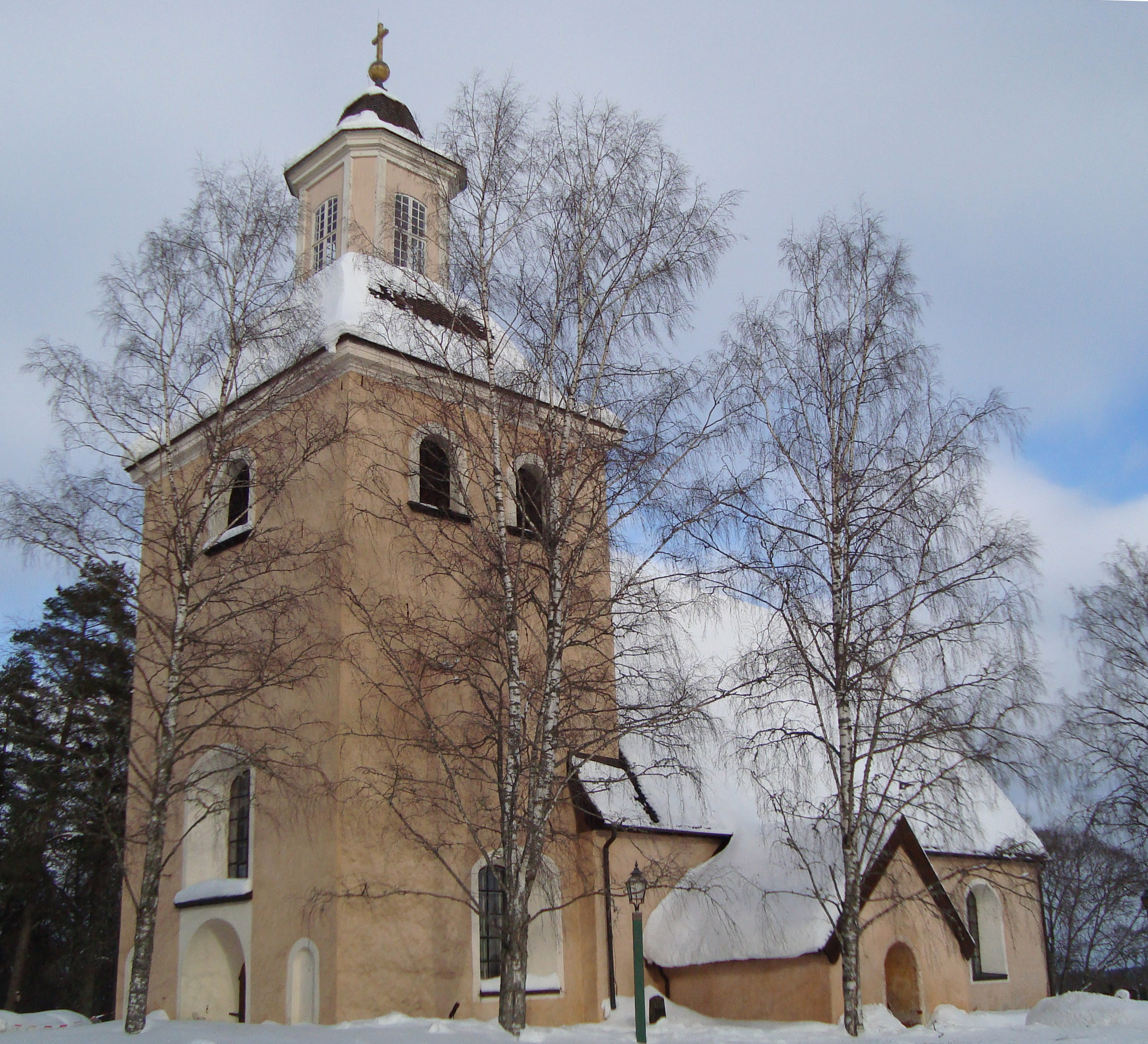
- Kumla Church in March 2010

- Location within Västmanland Location within Sweden
- Coordinates: 59°50′N 16°38′E
- Country: Sweden
- Province: Västmanland
- County: Västmanland County
- Municipality: Sala Municipality

Area
  - Total: 0.55 km^{2} (0.21 sq mi)

Population (31 December 2010)
  - Total: 206
  - Density: 372/km^{2} (960/sq mi)
- Time zone: UTC+1 (CET)
  - Summer (DST): UTC+2 (CEST)

Kumla kyrkby is a locality situated in Sala Municipality, Västmanland County, Sweden with 206 inhabitants in 2010.
