= Gunilla Herdenberg =

Swedish librarian (born 1956)

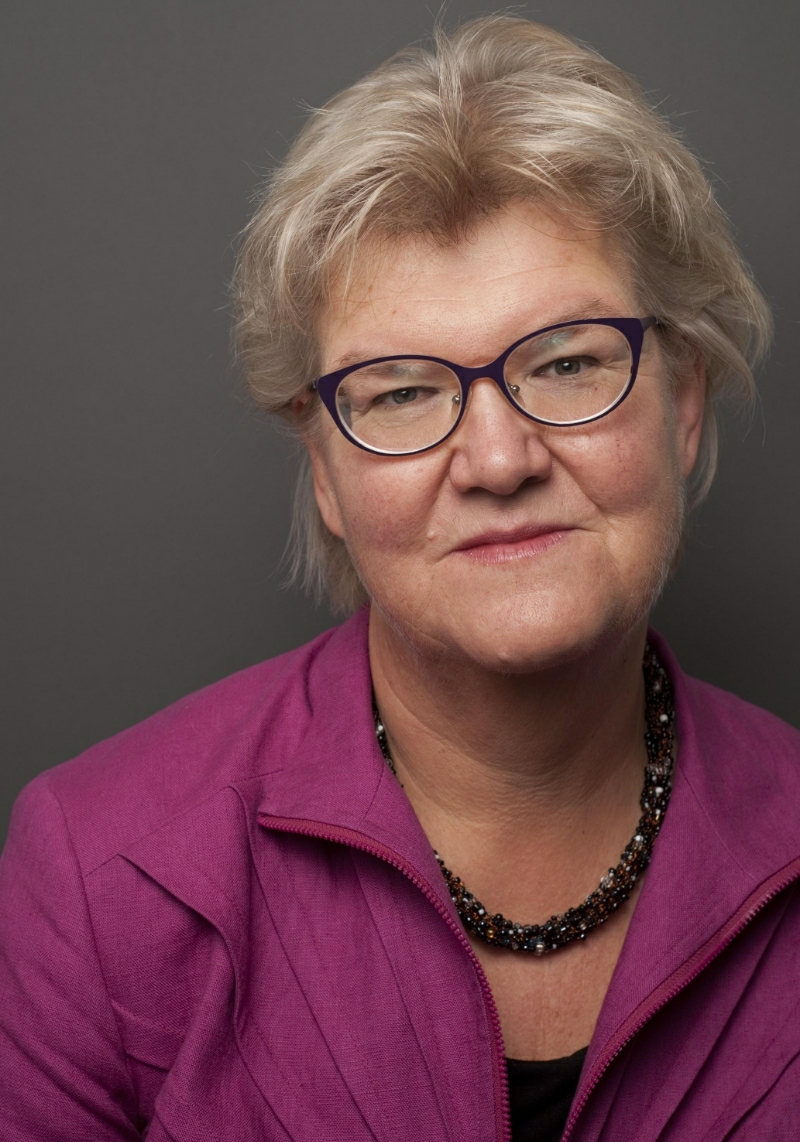
- Born: 18 February 1956 (age 70)
- Occupation: Librarian

Gunilla Herdenberg (born 18 February 1956) is a Swedish librarian. She held the position of National Librarian and Director of the National Library of Sweden from 2012 until 2019. From 2007 until 2012, she was Head of National Cooperation at the National Library.

Herdenberg has a background as City Librarian in Lund. She has been a member of several boards, among others Lund University Libraries, Library Service AB and the Swedish Library Association.
