= Gussjön =

- Location within Sweden
- Location: Sala Municipality, Sweden
- Coordinates: 59°53′51″N 16°22′47″E
- Type: lake

Gussjön is a lake in Sala Municipality, Sweden. It is situated close to Salbohed. The lake is a Natura 2000 area.
