= Anders Burius =

Swedish academic and criminal (1956 – 2004)

Erik Anders Burius
- Born: Erik Anders Jonsson; 2 August 1956; Eskilstuna, Sweden
- Died: 7 December 2004 (aged 48); Stockholm
- Education: Ph.D., Intellectual History, Uppsala University
- Occupations: Intellectual Historian; Librarian; Director
- Employers: Karolinska Institute(1984-?); National Library of Sweden (1995-2004)
- Known for: stealing and selling more than 53 rare and valuable books from various libraries

Erik Anders Burius (born Erik Anders Jonsson; 2 August 1956 – 7 December 2004), was a Swedish intellectual historian and director of the National Library of Sweden's manuscript department where he became known as the infamous "KB-mannen" (English: "the RL Man", after the Kungliga Biblioteket, the "Royal Library") following his theft and sale of several valuable books from the library's collection.

== Biography ==
Anders Burius studied at Uppsala University where in 1984 did his intellectual history dissertation "Ömhet om friheten - Studier i frihetstidens censurpolitik" (English: "Care for freedom: studies in the literary censorship during Sweden's Age of Liberty"). He also passed degrees in law, librarian, and real estate broker. After his studies, he worked among others, at the Caroline Institute's library. Towards the end of the 1980s he applied for the position of professor in History of Books at Lund University, but did not receive it despite ardent appeals in the appointment process. Instead, for a short period, Anders Burius pursued a legal career before returning to the library world in 1995 as director of the National Library of Sweden's manuscript department.
In a book released in 1995, "Biblioteken, kulturen och den sociala intelligensen" (editor: Lars Höglund), Anders Burius expressed in one article the view that all library history investigations need not be scientific in the strictest sense. Instead, Anders Burius emphasized the importance of practical experience and interaction with the current collections in his professional management. On behalf of the Swedish Academy, Anders Burius also wrote a commemorative book on the history of the Nobel Library.

After several years of stealing and selling at least 56 valuable books from the Nation Library's collection to Christoph Calaminus at the auction house Ketterer Kunst in Hamburg, Anders Burius was exposed and later confessed to the thefts in 2004. On 8 December 2004, at 04:39 am SOS Alarm received calls about a major explosion in central Stockholm. Thirteen fire trucks from four fire departments were sent to the scene, sixteen police patrols blocked off the area, and fifty-five people were evacuated by bus. During a short release from pre-court custody Anders Burius had died by suicide by slitting his wrist and cutting the gas line in his apartment, which later resulted in an extensive explosion with about a dozen people injured. His body was found among the debris four days later.

== Media ==
In 2008, Sveriges Radio channel P1 aired a documentary about Anders Burius, Bibliotekarien by Jesper Huor, that won Stora Radiopriset (English: The Great Radio Award). During 2010 the drama series Bibliotekstjuven was made by SVT with Gustaf Skarsgård playing the lead, inspired by the events surrounding "the RL Man", and aired on SVT1 in January 2011. The director Daniel Lind Lagerlöf termed the series "a drama inspired by a real story" and "not a drama documentary".

== Bibliography ==
- Hundra år i litteraturprisets tjänst (2002)
