= Stora torget (Sala) =

Square in Sala, Sweden

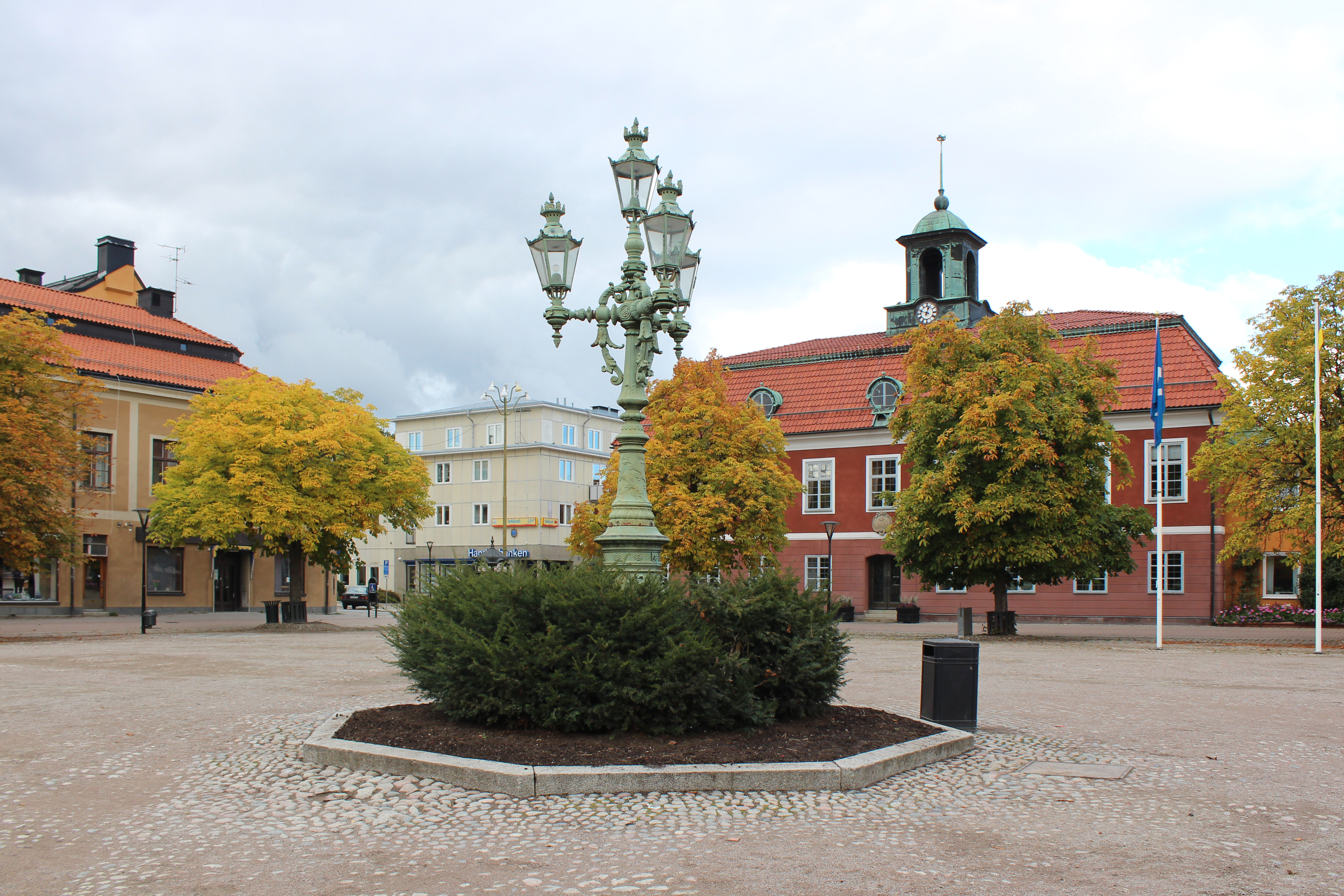
- Centre of the square, with Sala's town hall in the background
- Interactive map of Stora torget
- Location: Sala, Sweden
- Coordinates: 59.92001°N 16.60603°E

Construction
- Completion: 1624 (402 years ago)

Stora torget is a public square in Sala, Sweden. Drottninggatan, the town's main shopping street, begins at stora torget and runs west to Ekebygatan, while Bergsmansgatan runs east to Kålgårdsgatan. Sala's town hall and city hall are located on the northern side of the square.

Also known as a market square, it was established in 1624. A market is held in the square twice a week.

In 2022, plans were revealed to renovate the square for its 400th anniversary.
