= Sala, Sweden =

Sala
- Coat of arms

- Location within Västmanland Location within Sweden
- Coordinates: 59°55′N 16°36′E
- Country: Sweden
- Province: Västmanland
- County: Västmanland County
- Municipality: Sala Municipality
- City status: 1624

Area
  - Total: 11.01 km^{2} (4.25 sq mi)

Population (31 December 2010)
  - Total: 12,289
  - Density: 1,116/km^{2} (2,890/sq mi)
- Time zone: UTC+1 (CET)
  - Summer (DST): UTC+2 (CEST)
- Website: sala.se

Sala is a locality and the seat of Sala Municipality in Västmanland County, Sweden. As of 2010, it has a population of 12,289.

Sala is the home of several famous places and people, but it is most known for its silver mine, which today is a popular tourist attraction.

The Sagån River flows south through the locality, en route to Mälaren.

== Silver mine ==
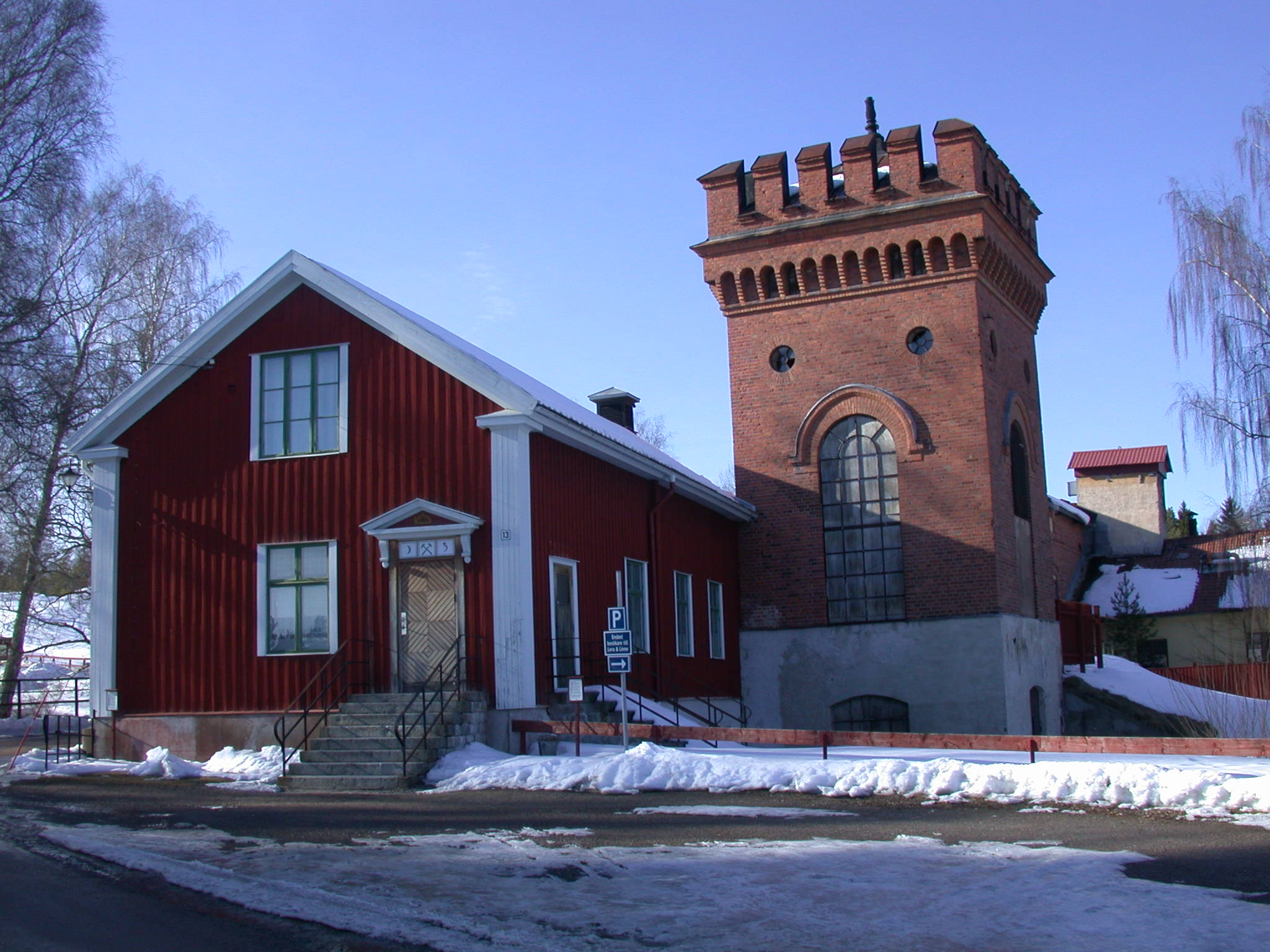
Sala silver mine's main office

The small town is best known for the historic Sala Silver Mine (Sala silvergruva), which is located about 2.7 kilometres (1.7 mi) southwest of the town. It dates back to at least Medieval times, and was in operation until 1908. In 1624, the town of Sala was moved to its current location close to the mine, receiving its royal charter from King Gustavus Adolphus.

The silver was important for Sweden's economy and the base for coin production. A total of 400 tonnes of silver was extracted, and 40,000 tonnes of lead; with at most 3-5 tonnes of silver during a year.

The mine eventually reached a depth of 300 metres (980 ft), and a total heading length of 19 km (12 mi).

== Amenities ==
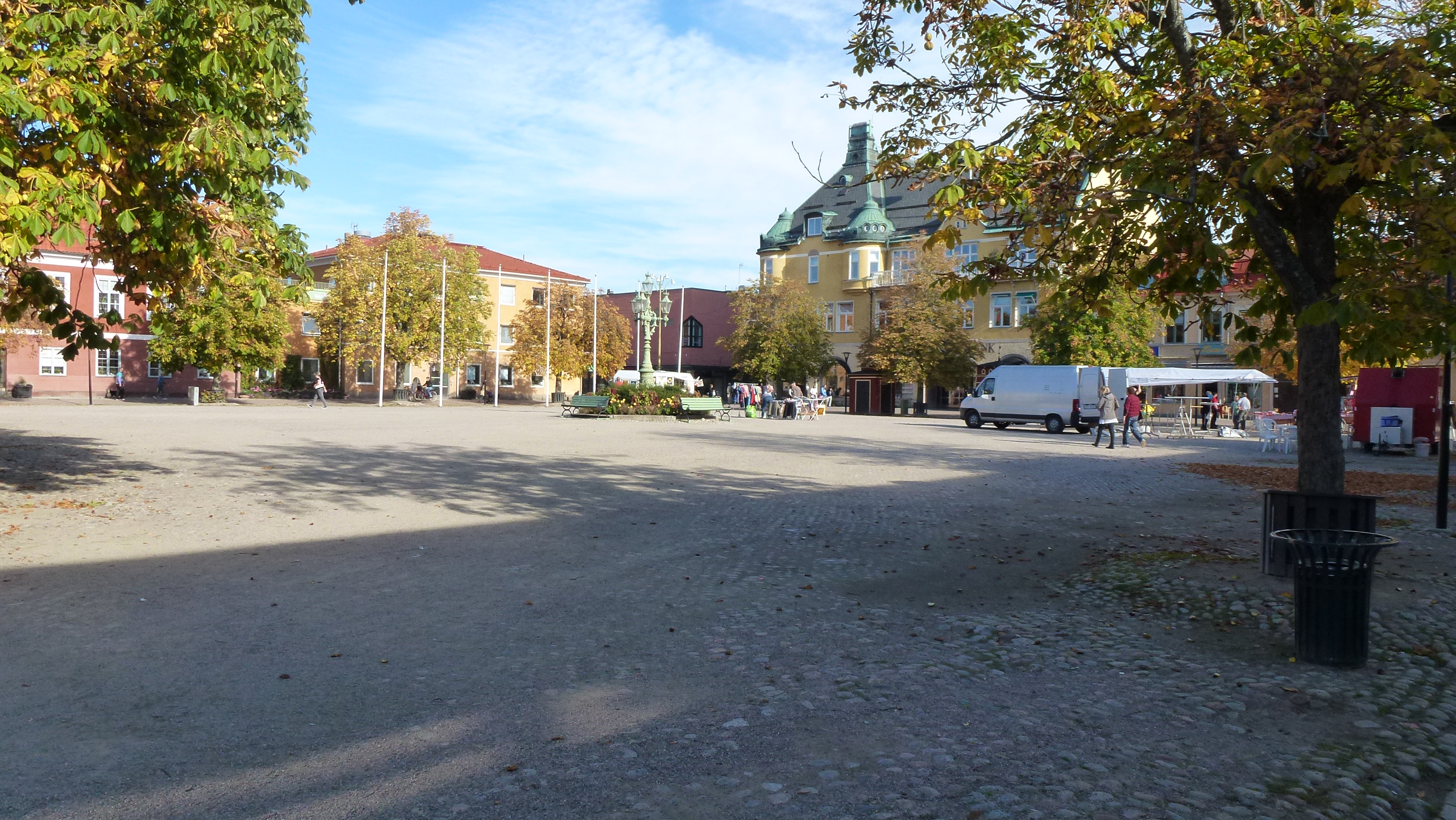
Sala stora torget (town square)

The main streets, in terms of retail outlets, are Drottninggatan (which begins at stora torget — the town square — and runs west to Ekebygatan) and Bergsmansgatan (which begins at stora torget and runs east to Kålgårdsgatan).

The spa town of Sätra brunn, about 14 km (9 mi) from Sala, is another important place for the town.

=== Måns Ols Utvärdshus ===
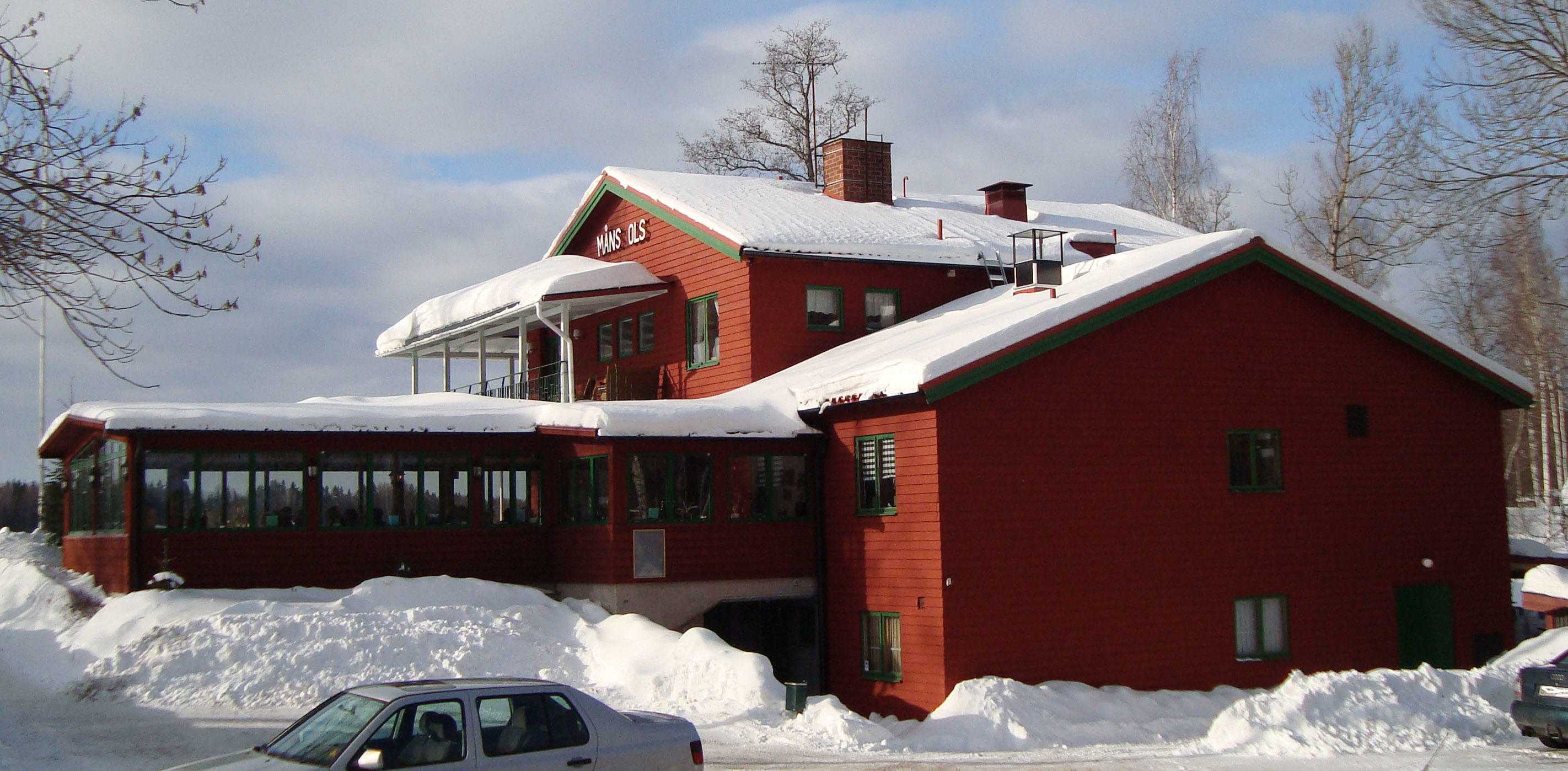
Måns Ols Utvärdshus in 2010, looking west from the car park towards Långforsen

Måns Ols Utvärdshus is a restaurant on the southeastern shore of Långforsen, a reservoir to the northwest of Sala's centre. The location was originally a dust keeper's home, and its first resident was Måns Olsson, who worked at the silver mine between 1709 and 1748. The building's purpose evolved, and from around 1791 it began serving food and drink. Starting in the summer seasons from the late 19th century, the venue played host to carnivals, performances and competitions. The current building was erected in the 1960s.

== Transportation ==
Sala's bus and train station is located on Stationsplan, a short semi-circular road off Väsbygatan. About 35 trains from Stockholm Central Station (either directly or indirectly) arrive at the station each day, with around 40 making the return trip. The three high-speed SJ Snabbtåg trips take about one hour and twenty minutes. Journeys on SJ InterCity trains take a similar amount of time and run seven times a day. The slower SJ Regionaltåg trains take just over two hours but make around 20 trips from the capital. There is one SJ Tåg i Bergslagen, which departs Stockholm at 22:14 and is direct to Sala.

The SJ trains that pass through terminate at either Stockholm, Linköping, Falun, Mora (once per day), Uppsala or Västerås.

Sala's airfield, Salanda flygfält, is located just east of highway 56, between Norrkivsta and Kumlaby. It is the home of Salaorten Flying Club (Salaorten Flygklubb), which flies Ultralight UL-B aircraft of type Atec Zephyr.

== Climate ==
Sala has a humid continental climate influenced by both its inland position but also frequent maritime winds reaching the town, moderating winter averages compared to what would be expected for an inland location on its latitude.

Climate data for Sala A (2002–2021 averages; extremes since 1995)
Month	Jan	Feb	Mar	Apr	May	Jun	Jul	Aug	Sep	Oct	Nov	Dec	Year
Record high °C (°F)	9.8 (49.6)	11.4 (52.5)	18.8 (65.8)	25.3 (77.5)	28.7 (83.7)	31.1 (88.0)	33.8 (92.8)	34.7 (94.5)	26.8 (80.2)	21.5 (70.7)	16.0 (60.8)	12.7 (54.9)	34.7 (94.5)
Mean maximum °C (°F)	6.0 (42.8)	7.5 (45.5)	13.3 (55.9)	19.4 (66.9)	24.9 (76.8)	27.6 (81.7)	29.6 (85.3)	28.3 (82.9)	22.7 (72.9)	15.9 (60.6)	10.9 (51.6)	7.2 (45.0)	30.6 (87.1)
Mean daily maximum °C (°F)	−0.6 (30.9)	0.5 (32.9)	4.8 (40.6)	11.4 (52.5)	16.8 (62.2)	21.1 (70.0)	23.5 (74.3)	21.8 (71.2)	16.8 (62.2)	9.6 (49.3)	4.4 (39.9)	1.1 (34.0)	10.9 (51.7)
Daily mean °C (°F)	−3.6 (25.5)	−3.0 (26.6)	0.4 (32.7)	6.1 (43.0)	11.2 (52.2)	15.0 (59.0)	17.4 (63.3)	16.1 (61.0)	11.9 (53.4)	6.1 (43.0)	1.9 (35.4)	−1.6 (29.1)	6.5 (43.7)
Mean daily minimum °C (°F)	−6.6 (20.1)	−6.4 (20.5)	−4.0 (24.8)	0.2 (32.4)	4.5 (40.1)	8.9 (48.0)	11.3 (52.3)	10.4 (50.7)	6.9 (44.4)	2.5 (36.5)	−0.6 (30.9)	−4.3 (24.3)	1.9 (35.4)
Mean minimum °C (°F)	−19.7 (−3.5)	−18.4 (−1.1)	−14.6 (5.7)	−6.7 (19.9)	−3.3 (26.1)	2.5 (36.5)	5.6 (42.1)	3.0 (37.4)	−1.1 (30.0)	−5.4 (22.3)	−10.3 (13.5)	−15.6 (3.9)	−22.9 (−9.2)
Record low °C (°F)	−32.6 (−26.7)	−30.1 (−22.2)	−25.0 (−13.0)	−12.0 (10.4)	−8.0 (17.6)	−1.5 (29.3)	2.2 (36.0)	−1.3 (29.7)	−5.7 (21.7)	−9.9 (14.2)	−17.4 (0.7)	−28.9 (−20.0)	−32.6 (−26.7)
Average precipitation mm (inches)	40.1 (1.58)	28.9 (1.14)	26.0 (1.02)	27.9 (1.10)	43.5 (1.71)	65.0 (2.56)	61.5 (2.42)	71.6 (2.82)	42.6 (1.68)	54.8 (2.16)	45.5 (1.79)	42.4 (1.67)	549.8 (21.65)
Source 1: SMHI Open Data for Sala A, temperature
Source 2: SMHI Open Data for Sala A, precipitation

== Sport ==
Sala's football club, Sala FF, play in Division 3 Södra Norrland in Sweden's fifth tier. They were founded in December 1972, when IF Norden and IFK Sala merged. Their former home was Silvervallen, but they now play at the sports fields on Sportfältsgatan.

The first floorball club in the world, Sala IBK, was founded in Sala 1979.

== Notable people ==
The impressionist painter Ivan Aguéli was born in Sala in 1869. There is a small museum and a park dedicated to his memory in the centre of the town. Sala is also the domicile of the former Swedish Minister of Foreign Affairs and former Deputy Prime Minister Lena Hjelm-Wallén. She held several ministerial posts in the Social Democratic government in the 1980s and 1990s and has, despite her career in politics, remained in Sala and is still active in local life.

Ice hockey player Erik Ersberg was born here. British horror and thriller writer Steven Savile lives in Sala.

== International relations ==
Sala is twinned with:

- Kristinestad, Finland
