= Sala Municipality, Sweden =

Sala Municipality Sala kommun
- Municipality
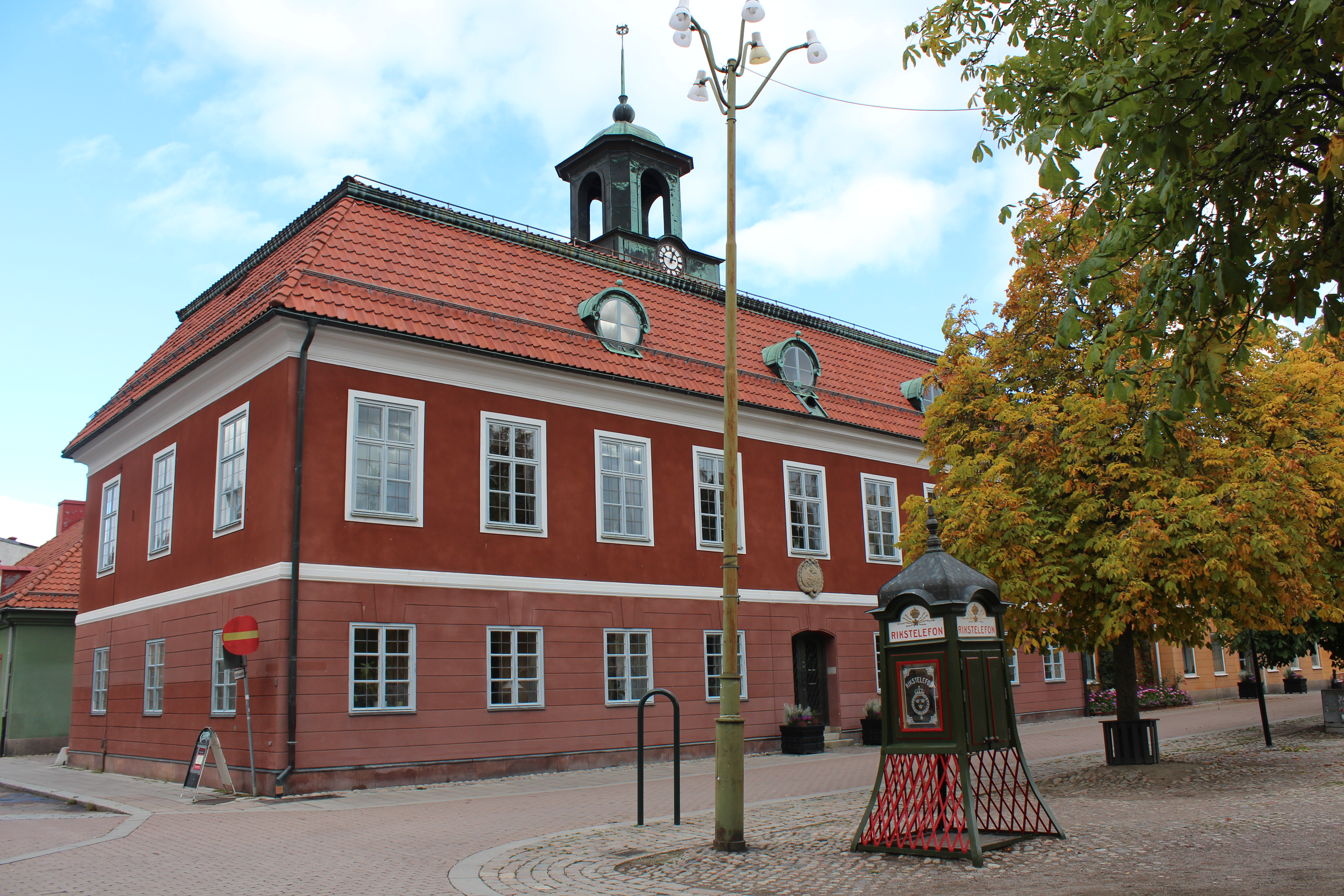
- Sala Town Hall

- Coat of arms

- Coordinates: 59°55′N 16°36′E
- Country: Sweden
- County: Västmanland County
- Seat: Sala

Area
  - Total: 1,204.39 km^{2} (465.02 sq mi)
  - Land: 1,166.85 km^{2} (450.52 sq mi)
  - Water: 37.54 km^{2} (14.49 sq mi)
- Area as of 1 January 2014.

Population (30 June 2025)
  - Total: 22,705
  - Density: 19.458/km^{2} (50.397/sq mi)
- Time zone: UTC+1 (CET)
  - Summer (DST): UTC+2 (CEST)
- ISO 3166 code: SE
- Province: Västmanland and Uppland
- Municipal code: 1981
- Website: www.sala.se

Sala Municipality (Swedish: Sala kommun) is a municipality in Västmanland County in central Sweden. Its seat is located in the city of Sala.

The present municipality was created in 1971, when the City of Sala was amalgamated with the rural municipalities Möklinta and Tärna and a part of Västerfärnebo.

== Localities ==
- Kila
- Kumla kyrkby
- Möklinta
- Norrbäck
- Ransta
- Sala (seat)
- Salbohed
- Sätra brunn
- Västerfärnebo

== Demographics ==
This is a demographic table based on Sala Municipality's electoral districts in the 2022 Swedish general election sourced from SVT's election platform, in turn taken from SCB official statistics.

In total there were 22,969 residents, including 17,496 Swedish citizens of voting age. 46.1% voted for the left coalition and 52.6% for the right coalition. Indicators are in percentage points except population totals and income.

Location	Residents	Citizen adults	Left vote	Right vote	Employed	Swedish parents	Foreign heritage	Income SEK	Degree
Location			%	%					
Centrum	2,070	1,786	50.1	49.1	76	83	17	21,676	29
Dalhem-Gärdesta	2,238	1,622	47.6	51.0	80	80	20	24,645	36
Jakobsberg-Bryggeriet	1,708	1,247	55.4	43.2	70	63	37	19,702	30
Kila-Fläckebo	1,722	1,390	44.2	53.9	87	92	8	26,910	36
Kumla-Ransta-Tärna	1,876	1,431	40.3	58.6	85	91	9	26,523	35
Kungsängen-Valla	1,701	1,383	50.8	48.0	87	81	19	26,980	38
Möklinta	1,237	949	33.6	64.2	80	90	10	22,502	24
Sala N	1,938	1,491	46.5	52.0	83	85	15	25,729	31
Sala S	2,307	1,712	46.5	52.7	85	85	15	28,039	38
Sala Ö	1,656	1,293	36.5	62.4	88	93	7	27,426	31
Västerfärnebo	2,106	1,677	39.6	59.6	85	92	8	24,113	29
Åkra	2,410	1,515	61.2	36.3	64	46	54	18,136	24
Source: SVT

== See also ==
- Gussjön
- 1936 Långforssjöloppet
