= Miata (disambiguation) =

Miata can refer to

- The Mazda MX-5 Miata car
- Miata, a female first name common among the Gola people
- Miata (Japanese: ミアータ, romanized: Miāta), a fictional character from Claymore; see List of Claymore characters
- Miata (horse), a Swedish horse competing in individual dressage at the 2015 European Dressage Championships
- Miata Party, a Swedish political party; see Results of the 2006 Swedish general election
- MIATA, a recursive acronym

== See also ==
- Miyata (disambiguation)
- Mihata (disambiguation)
