= Masayuki =

- Gender: Male

Origin
- Origin: Japanese
- Meaning: Different meanings depending on the kanji used

Masayuki (written: 正之, 正行,正幸, 昌之, 昌行, 昌幸, 昌由, 政之, 政行, 政幸, 雅之, 雅行, 真幸, 眞幸, 征之, 誠之, 将之 or 摩砂雪) is a masculine Japanese given name. Notable people with the name include:

- Masayuki (animator) (摩砂雪; born 1961), Japanese animator and director
- Masayuki Deai (出合 正幸; born 1981), Japanese actor
- Masayuki Dobashi (土橋 正幸; 1935–2013), Japanese baseball player and manager
- Masayuki Fujio (藤尾 正行; 1917–2006), Japanese politician
- Hanabusa Masayuki (花房 正幸; 1524–1605), Japanese samurai
- Masayuki Hirahara (平原 誠之; born 1980), Japanese pianist and composer
- Masayuki Hisataka (久高 正之; born 1940), Japanese karateka
- Hoshina Masayuki (保科 正之; 1611–1673), Japanese daimyō
- Masayuki Hyokai (氷海 正行; born 1950), Japanese handball player
- Masayuki Ishikawa (石川 雅之; born 1974), Japanese manga artist
- Masayuki Iwamoto (岩本 雅之), Japanese astronomer
- Masayuki Izumikawa (泉川 正幸; born 1971), Japanese volleyball player
- Masayuki Katō (加藤 将之; born 1972), Japanese voice actor
- Masayuki Kawahara (川原 正行; born 1956), Japanese speed skater
- Masayuki Kawamura (河村 正之; 1878–1933), Japanese physician
- Masayuki Kawamura (golfer) (born 1967), Japanese golfer
- Masayuki Kikuchi (菊地 正幸; 1948–2003), Japanese seismologist
- Masayuki Kishida (岸田 真幸; born 1985), Japanese swimmer
- Masayuki Kojima (小島 正幸; born 1961), Japanese animator and anime director
- Masayuki Kono (河野 真幸; born 1980), Japanese professional wrestler and mixed martial artist
- Masayuki Matsubara (松原 正之; born 1939), Japanese sport wrestler
- Masayuki Matsunaga (松永 政行; born 1970), Japanese gymnast
- Masayuki Minami (南 将之; 1941–2000), Japanese volleyball player
- Masayuki Mita (見田 雅之; born 1969), Japanese footballer
- Masayuki Miyaji (宮地 昌幸; born 1976), Japanese anime director
- Masayuki Miyata (宮田 雅之; 1926–1997), Japanese artist
- Mitoizumi Masayuki (水戸泉 眞幸; born 1962), Japanese sumo wrestler
- Masayuki Mori (actor) (森 雅之; 1911–1973), Japanese actor
- Masayuki Mori (film producer) (森 昌行; born 1953), Japanese film producer
- Masayuki Nagare (流 政之; born 1923), Japanese sculptor
- Masayuki Nakagomi (中込 正行; born 1967), Japanese footballer
- Masayuki Naoshima (直嶋 正行; born 1945), Japanese politician
- Masayuki Naruse (成瀬 昌由), Japanese professional wrestler
- Masayuki Ochiai (落合 正幸), Japanese film director
- Masayuki Ochiai (footballer) (落合 正幸; born 1981), Japanese footballer
- Masayuki Okano (岡野 雅行; born 1972), Japanese footballer
- Masayuki Okuyama (奧山 政幸; born 1993), Japanese footballer
- Masayuki Omori (大森 征之; born 1976), Japanese footballer
- Masayuki Onishi (大西 昌之; born 1977), Japanese footballer
- Masayuki Osawa (大沢 正行; born 1946), Japanese swimmer
- Masayuki Ota (太田 雅之; born 1973), Japanese footballer
- Masayuki Sakoi (迫井 政行; born 1974), Japanese anime director
- Sanada Masayuki (真田 昌幸; 1540s – 1611), Japanese daimyō
- Masayuki Sano (佐野 雅之; born 1919), Japanese fencer
- Masayuki Suo (周防 正行; born 1956), Japanese film director
- Masayuki Suzuki (鈴木 雅之; born 1956), Japanese singer
- Masayuki Suzuki (drummer) (鈴木 政行; born 1972), Japanese drummer
- Masayuki Takagi (高木 雅行), Japanese film producer
- Masayuki Takahashi (高橋 雅之; born 1962), Japanese sailor
- Masayuki Takayanagi (高柳 昌行; 1932–1991), Japanese musician
- Masayuki Tanaka (田中 雅之; born 1951), Japanese singer
- Masayuki Tani (谷 正之; 1899–1962), Japanese politician
- Tochihikari Masayuki (栃光 正之; 1933–1977), Japanese sumo wrestler
- Masayuki Tokioka (1897–1998), Japanese businessman
- Masayuki Toyoshima (豊島 将之; born 1990), Japanese shogi player
- Masayuki Uemura (上村 雅之; born 1943), Japanese video game hardware designer
- Masayuki Yamada (山田 将之; born 1994), Japanese footballer
- Masayuki Yanagisawa (柳沢 将之; born 1979), Japanese footballer
- Masayuki Yanai (箭内 政之; born 1959), Japanese astronomer

== See also ==
- 8206 Masayuki, a main-belt asteroid
