= Miyata (disambiguation) =

Miyata is a Japanese manufacturer of bicycles, unicycles and fire extinguishers.

Miyata may also refer to:

- Miyata 310, "semi-pro" road bicycle that was manufactured by Miyata until 1986.
- Koga Miyata, Dutch bicycle manufacturer
- Miyata, Fukuoka (宮田町, Miyata-machi) a former town located in Kurate District, Fukuoka Prefecture, Japan
- 8369 Miyata, a main-belt asteroid, the 8369th asteroid registered
- Miyata (surname), people with the surname Miyata

== See also ==
- Miata (disambiguation)
- Mihata (disambiguation)
