= Mihata =

Mihata can refer to:

- Mihata, an alternative spelling of Michata, a settlement on the Greek island of Kefalonia
- Mihata Station, a train station in Nabari, Japan
- Mount Mihata (Japanese: 御旗山), Aichi, Japan; see List of Historic Sites of Japan (Aichi)
- Joryu Mihata, a Japanese artist

== See also ==
- Miata (disambiguation)
- Miyata (disambiguation)
