= Miyata (surname) =

Miyata is a Japanese surname. Notable people with the surname include:

== Actors ==
- Hironori Miyata (born 1960), voice actor
- Kazuko Miyata (born 1969), film and television actor
- Kōki Miyata, voice actor

== Athletes ==
- Daichi Miyata (born 1996), figure skater
- Fúlvio Miyata (born 1977), Brazilian judoka
- Kazuyuki Miyata (born 1976), mixed martial artist
- Koji Miyata (born 1923), footballer
- Naoki Miyata (born 1987), footballer
- Ritomo Miyata (born 1999), racing driver
- Shoko Miyata (born 2004), artistic gymnast
- Toshihiko Miyata (宮田 俊彦), Japanese table tennis player
- Yukari Miyata (born 1989), volleyball player

== Musicians ==
- Kōhachiro Miyata (born 1938), flautist and composer
- Mako Miyata, singer
- Mayumi Miyata, shō player

== Other ==
- Atsushi Miyata (born 1981), professional shogi player
- Janet Miyata (born 1956), mother of 2-time NASCAR Cup Series champion Kyle Larson
- Marino Miyata (born 1991), former beauty pageant titleholder
- Masayuki Miyata (1926–1997), kiri-e artist
- Noboru Miyata (1936–2000), folklorist

== See also ==
- Miyata
