= Results of the 2006 Swedish general election =

Sweden held a general election on 17 September 2006.

== National results ==
The final results were published on 21 September 2006 by the Swedish Election Authority (Valmyndigheten). Apart from separating the minor parties, there were no big changes to the preliminary count from the election night. 6,892,009 people were eligible to vote in the election. The results are here compared with the 2002 election. There were 5,551,278 valid ballots cast, a turnout of 82%.

Party	Votes	%	Seats			
Party	Votes	%	Con.	Lev.	Tot.	+/–
Swedish Social Democratic Party	1,942,625	34.99	129	1	130	–14
Moderate Party	1,456,014	26.23	93	4	97	+42
Centre Party	437,389	7.88	27	2	29	+7
Liberal People's Party	418,395	7.54	22	6	28	–20
Christian Democrats	365,998	6.59	17	7	24	–9
Left Party	324,722	5.85	13	9	22	–8
Green Party	291,121	5.24	9	10	19	+2
Sweden Democrats	162,463	2.93	0	0	0	0
Feminist Initiative	37,954	0.68	0	0	0	New
Pirate Party	34,918	0.63	0	0	0	New
Swedish Senior Citizen Interest Party	28,806	0.52	0	0	0	0
June List	26,072	0.47	0	0	0	New
Health Care Party	11,519	0.21	0	0	0	New
National Democrats	3,064	0.06	0	0	0	0
Unity	2,648	0.05	0	0	0	0
National Socialist Front	1,417	0.03	0	0	0	New
New Future	1,171	0.02	0	0	0	0
Socialist Justice Party	1,097	0.02	0	0	0	0
People's Will	881	0.02	0	0	0	New
Communist Party	438	0.01	0	0	0	0
Unique Party	222	0.00	0	0	0	New
Classical Liberal Party	202	0.00	0	0	0	New
Alliance Party	133	0.00	0	0	0	0
Women's Power	116	0.00	0	0	0	New
European Workers Party	83	0.00	0	0	0	0
Direct Democrats	81	0.00	0	0	0	New
Sweden out of the EU / Freedom and Justice Party	75	0.00	0	0	0	New
National Democratic Party	68	0.00	0	0	0	0
Partiet.se	61	0.00	0	0	0	New
September List	51	0.00	0	0	0	New
Communist League	30	0.00	0	0	0	0
Nordic Union	24	0.00	0	0	0	New
Scania Party	11	0.00	0	0	0	0
Tax Reformists	9	0.00	0	0	0	0
Rikshushållarna	8	0.00	0	0	0	0
Miata Party	7	0.00	0	0	0	New
New Swedes D.P.N.S.	6	0.00	0	0	0	0
Fårgutapartiet	6	0.00	0	0	0	New
Palmes Party	5	0.00	0	0	0	New
Republicans	2	0.00	0	0	0	0
Viking Party	1	0.00	0	0	0	New
Other parties	1,365	0.02	0	0	0	–
Total	5,551,278	100.00	310	39	349	0
Valid votes	5,551,278	98.25				
Invalid/blank votes	99,138	1.75				
Total votes	5,650,416	100.00				
Registered voters/turnout	6,892,009	81.99				
Source: Val.se

Three hours after the polls closed, the result was clear enough for Moderate Party leader Fredrik Reinfeldt to declare himself the victor and for Göran Persson to announce his resignation as Prime Minister and as leader of the Social Democratic Party. The four centre-right parties of Alliance for Sweden formed, as expected, a government with Fredrik Reinfeldt as Prime Minister. The Speaker had asked Reinfeldt to begin this formation on 19 September but, as is usual, requested the Cabinet of Göran Persson to stay on as a caretaker government until the Riksdag formally elected a new prime minister. The newly elected Riksdag convened on 2 October and the government was presented on 6 October.

The election result is historic in being the worst result for the Social Democrats ever in a general election with universal suffrage (introduced in 1921) and the best result for the Moderates since 1928.

Minor parties, that are not represented in the Riksdag, got a total of 5.7% of the votes, which was an increase of 2.6 percentage points, compared to the 2002 election. Behind this increase lay a great success for the Sweden Democrats, gaining 2.9% (+1.5 percentage points) and thus surpassing the limit (2.5%) for gaining governmental financial support for the next four years. Two new parties, Feminist Initiative (0.7%) and the Pirate Party (0.6%), also contributed to the increase.

Of the 349 elected Riksdag members, 164 (or 47%) were women.

== Regional results ==
=== Percentage share ===
Location	Turnout	Share	Votes	S	M	C	FP	KD	V	MP	SD	Other	Left	Right
Götaland	82.0	48.3	2,680,093	34.9	25.9	7.8	7.5	7.4	5.1	4.8	3.7	2.9	44.8	48.6
Svealand	82.2	38.8	2,152,956	31.8	30.1	7.0	8.3	6.1	5.9	6.0	2.3	2.5	43.7	51.5
Norrland	81.2	12.9	718,229	45.1	15.9	10.7	5.2	5.2	8.4	4.6	1.9	3.0	58.0	37.0
Total	82.0	100.0	5,551,278	35.0	26.2	7.9	7.5	6.6	5.9	5.2	2.9	2.7	46.1	48.2
Source: val.se

=== By votes ===
Location	Turnout	Share	Votes	S	M	C	FP	KD	V	MP	SD	Other	Left	Right
Götaland	82.0	48.3	2,680,093	935,326	693,632	209,678	201,326	197,905	137,075	128,228	99,985	76,938	1,200,629	1,302,541
Svealand	82.2	38.8	2,152,956	683,638	648,248	150,509	179,584	130,819	127,527	129,946	48,703	53,982	941,111	1,109,160
Norrland	81.2	12.9	718,229	323,661	114,134	77,202	37,485	37,274	60,120	32,947	13,775	21,631	416,728	266,095
Total	82.0	100.0	5,551,278	1,942,625	1,456,014	437,389	418,395	365,998	324,722	291,121	162,463	152,551	2,558,468	2,677,796
Source: val.se

== Results by statistical area ==
=== Percentage share ===
Location	Share	Votes	S	M	C	FP	KD	V	MP	SD	Other	Left	Right
East Middle Sweden	16.9	937,909	38.3	23.6	7.8	7.4	6.7	5.6	5.1	2.7	2.9	49.0	45.4
Middle Norrland	4.2	231,435	44.0	17.3	12.7	5.0	5.5	7.2	4.2	2.0	2.6	55.4	40.0
North Middle Sweden	9.1	505,264	41.4	20.1	10.6	5.5	5.5	7.0	4.2	2.9	2.9	52.5	41.7
Småland & Islands	9.0	499,908	37.3	22.4	10.6	5.3	10.7	4.8	3.9	3.1	1.9	46.0	49.0
South Sweden	14.5	803,012	34.7	28.7	6.0	8.2	5.0	4.0	4.4	5.8	3.2	43.1	47.9
Stockholm County	20.5	1,139,679	24.9	37.0	5.5	9.5	6.0	5.9	7.1	1.8	2.4	37.9	57.9
Upper Norrland	5.7	319,066	47.6	13.5	9.2	5.3	5.4	9.4	5.0	1.3	3.3	62.0	33.4
West Sweden	20.1	1,115,005	33.4	25.7	8.0	8.2	7.6	6.0	5.4	2.8	2.9	44.8	49.5
Total	100.0	5,551,278	35.0	26.2	7.9	7.5	6.6	5.9	5.2	2.9	2.7	46.1	48.2
Source: val.se

=== By votes ===
Location	Share	Votes	S	M	C	FP	KD	V	MP	SD	Other	Left	Right
East Middle Sweden	16.9	937,909	359,062	221,158	73,133	69,305	62,549	52,317	48,073	24,860	27,452	459,452	426,145
Middle Norrland	4.2	231,435	101,837	40,072	29,308	11,514	11,588	16,713	9,778	4,624	6,001	128,328	92,482
North Middle Sweden	9.1	505,264	208,931	101,739	53,680	27,689	27,582	35,375	21,155	14,565	14,548	265,461	210,690
Småland & Islands	9.0	499,908	186,284	111,901	53,041	26,597	53,657	23,786	19,689	15,595	9,358	229,759	245,196
South Sweden	14.5	803,012	278,613	230,639	48,101	65,726	40,324	32,483	35,023	46,535	25,568	346,119	384,790
Stockholm County	20.5	1,139,679	283,666	421,311	62,255	108,654	68,119	66,777	81,395	20,383	27,119	431,838	660,339
Upper Norrland	5.7	319,066	151,865	43,139	29,219	17,024	17,086	30,093	15,894	4,134	10,612	197,852	106,468
West Sweden	20.1	1,115,005	372,367	286,055	88,652	91,886	85,093	67,178	60,114	31,767	31,893	499,659	551,686
Total	100.0	5,551,278	1,942,625	1,456,014	437,389	418,395	365,998	324,722	291,121	162,463	152,551	2,558,468	2,677,796
Source: val.se

== Constituency results ==
=== Percentage share ===
Constituency	Land	Turnout	Share	Votes	S	M	C	FP	KD	V	MP	SD	Other	Left	Right	Margin
Constituency		%	%		%	%	%	%	%	%	%	%	%	%	%	
Blekinge	G	83.1	1.7	95,781	42.3	22.0	7.2	6.4	5.2	5.4	3.7	6.2	1.6	51.4	40.8	10,197
Dalarna	S	80.5	3.0	169,110	40.3	21.1	10.8	5.1	5.4	6.7	4.4	2.8	3.5	51.3	42.4	15,178
Gothenburg	G	79.5	5.3	292,726	28.9	26.9	4.5	10.2	6.7	8.7	8.4	2.5	3.1	46.0	48.3	6,640
Gotland	G	81.4	0.6	35,750	34.9	21.6	19.3	4.4	3.8	6.0	6.3	1.6	2.3	47.1	49.0	680
Gävleborg	N	79.3	3.0	167,728	41.7	18.4	11.1	5.3	5.1	7.9	4.3	3.0	3.0	54.0	40.0	23,403
Halland	G	83.5	3.2	179,470	31.6	29.7	10.4	7.7	6.7	4.0	4.0	2.9	3.1	39.6	54.4	26,538
Jämtland	N	79.8	1.4	78,018	40.2	17.6	16.8	4.1	3.7	8.3	5.0	1.6	2.7	53.5	42.3	8,709
Jönköping	G	83.4	3.7	205,300	35.4	22.1	8.4	5.4	16.1	4.3	3.4	3.2	1.8	43.1	51.9	17,959
Kalmar	G	82.2	2.7	147,531	41.4	21.3	11.1	5.2	7.1	5.0	3.9	3.2	1.9	50.2	44.7	8,191
Kronoberg	G	82.8	2.0	111,327	36.0	24.7	11.3	5.7	7.9	4.9	4.2	3.5	1.8	45.1	49.6	4,989
Malmö	G	77.6	2.8	155,302	35.2	28.5	2.9	8.9	3.5	5.5	6.1	5.0	4.6	46.8	43.7	4,776
Norrbotten	N	81.8	2.8	156,576	51.5	13.4	6.4	4.3	4.2	10.5	4.1	1.5	4.2	66.1	28.3	59,155
Skåne NE	G	80.1	3.2	178,664	35.2	27.4	8.3	7.1	6.7	3.4	3.4	5.6	2.9	42.0	49.5	13,487
Skåne S	G	84.6	3.8	211,334	30.3	33.1	6.0	9.2	4.8	3.5	4.8	5.3	3.1	38.5	53.1	30,904
Skåne W	G	80.1	2.9	161,931	34.9	28.7	5.7	8.5	4.9	3.3	3.7	7.1	3.2	42.0	47.7	9,253
Stockholm	S	82.4	8.7	482,455	23.2	35.1	5.7	10.1	5.0	7.4	9.3	1.6	2.7	39.9	55.8	76,860
Stockholm County	S	82.9	11.8	657,224	26.2	38.4	5.3	9.2	6.7	4.7	5.5	1.9	2.2	36.4	59.5	151,641
Södermanland	S	82.0	2.9	159,750	42.2	23.4	6.9	6.8	6.2	4.9	5.1	2.5	1.9	52.3	43.2	14,421
Uppsala	S	82.9	3.5	196,389	30.9	26.5	9.9	9.1	6.6	5.7	6.3	2.3	2.8	42.9	52.1	18,035
Värmland	S	81.3	3.0	168,426	42.0	20.9	10.0	6.0	5.8	6.4	3.9	2.9	2.2	52.3	42.7	16,190
Västerbotten	N	82.9	2.9	162,490	43.9	13.7	11.8	6.4	6.5	8.4	5.9	1.1	2.5	58.1	38.3	32,229
Västernorrland	N	81.5	2.8	153,417	46.0	17.2	10.6	5.4	5.7	6.7	3.8	2.2	2.6	56.5	38.8	27,137
Västmanland	S	80.8	2.7	148,299	39.8	23.3	6.9	8.1	5.7	6.2	4.3	2.5	3.2	50.3	44.0	9,236
Västra Götaland E	G	82.5	2.9	159,388	38.4	23.5	10.5	5.5	8.2	5.1	3.7	3.1	2.1	47.2	47.6	727
Västra Götaland N	G	82.7	2.9	162,432	38.5	21.2	8.9	7.5	8.1	5.8	4.8	2.8	2.5	49.1	45.6	5,633
Västra Götaland S	G	82.2	2.0	113,271	35.7	24.1	9.5	6.5	8.0	5.5	4.0	3.2	3.6	45.2	48.1	3,280
Västra Götaland W	G	83.6	3.7	207,718	32.1	26.5	7.3	9.6	8.7	5.2	4.9	2.9	2.8	42.2	52.1	20,475
Örebro	S	82.8	3.1	171,303	43.1	18.8	7.5	6.6	7.2	6.1	4.6	3.8	2.4	53.8	40.1	23,462
Östergötland	G	83.4	4.7	262,168	37.4	24.8	7.6	6.5	7.2	5.2	5.1	2.3	3.9	47.7	46.1	4,223
Total		82.0	100.0	5,551,278	35.0	26.2	7.9	7.5	6.6	5.9	5.2	2.9	2.7	46.1	48.2	119,328
Source: val.se

=== By votes ===
Constituency	Land	Turnout	Share	Votes	S	M	C	FP	KD	V	MP	SD	Other	Left	Right	Margin
Constituency		%	%													
Blekinge	G	83.1	1.7	95,781	40,532	21,109	6,855	6,105	4,964	5,193	3,505	5,945	1,573	49,230	39,033	10,197
Dalarna	S	80.5	3.0	169,110	68,218	35,615	18,197	8,681	9,159	11,251	7,361	4,723	5,905	86,830	71,652	15,178
Gothenburg	G	79.5	5.3	292,726	84,693	78,679	13,076	29,981	19,698	25,407	24,694	7,455	9,043	134,794	141,434	6,640
Gotland	G	81.4	0.6	35,750	12,464	7,715	6,883	1,554	1,374	2,145	2,237	566	812	16,846	17,526	680
Gävleborg	N	79.3	3.0	167,728	69,959	30,923	18,675	8,947	8,600	13,314	7,275	5,017	5,018	90,548	67,145	23,403
Halland	G	83.5	3.2	179,470	56,747	53,257	18,589	13,798	11,987	7,110	7,236	5,223	5,523	71,093	97,631	26,538
Jämtland	N	79.8	1.4	78,018	31,322	13,753	13,111	3,226	2,914	6,484	3,907	1,224	2,077	41,713	33,004	8,709
Jönköping	G	83.4	3.7	205,300	72,757	45,302	17,290	10,982	32,946	8,734	7,070	6,514	3,705	88,561	106,520	17,959
Kalmar	G	82.2	2.7	147,531	61,007	31,430	16,306	7,680	10,513	7,426	5,687	4,675	2,807	74,120	65,929	8,191
Kronoberg	G	82.8	2.0	111,327	40,056	27,454	12,562	6,381	8,824	5,481	4,695	3,840	2,034	50,232	55,221	4,989
Malmö	G	77.6	2.8	155,302	54,732	44,232	4,475	13,769	5,373	8,468	9,425	7,708	7,120	72,625	67,849	4,776
Norrbotten	N	81.8	2.8	156,576	80,605	20,926	10,065	6,714	6,589	16,494	6,350	2,302	6,531	103,449	44,294	59,155
Skåne NE	G	80.1	3.2	178,664	62,794	48,946	14,836	12,673	11,993	6,116	6,051	10,061	5,194	74,961	88,448	13,487
Skåne S	G	84.6	3.8	211,334	63,975	69,959	12,751	19,422	10,125	7,297	10,081	11,272	6,452	81,353	112,257	30,904
Skåne W	G	80.1	2.9	161,931	56,580	46,393	9,184	13,757	7,869	5,409	5,961	11,549	5,229	67,950	77,203	9,253
Stockholm	S	82.4	8.7	482,455	111,765	169,211	27,257	48,476	24,327	35,616	45,030	7,912	12,861	192,411	269,271	76,860
Stockholm County	S	82.9	11.8	657,224	171,901	252,100	34,998	60,178	43,792	31,161	36,365	12,471	14,258	239,427	391,068	151,641
Södermanland	S	82.0	2.9	159,750	67,458	37,350	10,942	10,843	9,950	7,830	8,218	4,050	3,109	83,506	69,085	14,421
Uppsala	S	82.9	3.5	196,389	60,674	52,016	19,340	17,929	12,976	11,240	12,312	4,483	5,419	84,226	102,261	18,035
Värmland	S	81.3	3.0	168,426	70,754	35,201	16,808	10,061	9,823	10,810	6,519	4,825	3,625	88,083	71,893	16,190
Västerbotten	N	82.9	2.9	162,490	71,260	22,213	19,154	10,310	10,497	13,599	9,544	1,832	4,081	94,403	62,174	32,229
Västernorrland	N	81.5	2.8	153,417	70,515	26,319	16,197	8,288	8,674	10,229	5,871	3,400	3,924	86,615	59,478	27,137
Västmanland	S	80.8	2.7	148,299	59,014	34,533	10,186	12,076	8,502	9,211	6,308	3,717	4,752	74,533	65,297	9,236
Västra Götaland E	G	82.5	2.9	159,388	61,219	37,484	16,655	8,702	13,091	8,165	5,821	4,883	3,368	75,205	75,932	727
Västra Götaland N	G	82.7	2.9	162,432	62,574	34,427	14,471	12,095	13,123	9,386	7,789	4,532	4,035	79,749	74,116	5,633
Västra Götaland S	G	82.2	2.0	113,271	40,429	27,238	10,726	7,373	9,093	6,233	4,488	3,600	4,091	51,150	54,430	3,280
Västra Götaland W	G	83.6	3.7	207,718	66,705	54,970	15,135	19,937	18,101	10,877	10,086	6,074	5,833	87,668	108,143	20,475
Örebro	S	82.8	3.1	171,303	73,854	32,222	12,781	11,340	12,290	10,408	7,833	6,522	4,053	92,095	68,633	23,462
Östergötland	G	83.4	4.7	262,168	98,062	65,037	19,884	17,117	18,831	13,628	13,402	6,088	10,119	125,092	120,869	4,223
Total		82.0	100.0	5,551,278	1,942,625	1,456,014	437,389	418,395	365,998	324,722	291,121	162,463	152,551	2,558,468	2,677,796	119,328
Source: val.se

== Municipal summary ==
Location	County	Turnout	Votes	S	M	C	FP	KD	V	MP	SD	Other	Left	Right
Ale	Västra Götaland	81.7	15,405	40.0	21.2	7.0	7.2	7.1	7.2	4.2	3.9	2.2	51.4	42.5
Alingsås	Västra Götaland	84.9	23,144	31.5	22.7	8.1	9.7	10.4	6.4	6.7	2.4	2.2	44.6	50.9
Alvesta	Kronoberg	82.8	11,567	36.9	24.1	13.0	5.1	7.5	4.4	3.2	3.8	2.0	44.5	49.7
Aneby	Jönköping	84.6	4,160	31.5	17.6	13.1	4.9	22.0	3.2	2.8	3.3	1.6	37.5	57.6
Arboga	Västmanland	81.0	8,207	42.1	21.1	8.8	6.6	5.2	6.4	3.9	2.4	3.5	52.3	41.7
Arjeplog	Norrbotten	78.3	1,955	45.0	10.7	10.3	6.1	4.8	14.5	3.2	1.7	3.7	62.6	31.9
Arvidsjaur	Norrbotten	81.9	4,438	57.5	10.5	7.5	3.9	2.1	12.5	1.7	1.0	3.3	71.6	24.0
Arvika	Värmland	79.1	15,608	41.6	18.5	11.2	5.5	5.4	6.8	4.9	3.9	2.1	53.3	40.7
Askersund	Örebro	82.7	7,371	43.9	18.6	10.9	5.2	7.4	5.4	3.5	3.7	1.3	52.9	42.1
Avesta	Dalarna	80.6	13,734	46.1	19.3	8.4	4.9	4.4	6.6	3.4	4.0	2.8	56.2	37.0
Bengtsfors	Västra Götaland	78.9	6,096	42.8	16.6	14.4	4.9	6.9	5.5	4.1	2.1	2.8	52.4	42.7
Berg	Jämtland	77.1	4,544	35.9	16.4	24.3	2.2	4.2	7.7	4.3	1.7	3.4	47.9	47.0
Bjurholm	Västerbotten	79.5	1,570	35.7	19.2	20.0	9.7	8.4	3.2	2.2	0.3	1.3	41.1	57.3
Bjuv	Skåne	76.9	7,619	48.2	20.7	4.4	4.9	4.3	3.0	2.0	10.3	2.3	53.2	34.3
Boden	Norrbotten	83.0	17,831	48.9	18.0	5.5	4.2	4.7	8.8	2.9	1.9	5.1	60.7	32.4
Bollebygd	Västra Götaland	86.2	5,171	32.4	27.1	9.4	6.6	8.5	5.6	3.5	3.8	3.2	41.5	51.6
Bollnäs	Gävleborg	77.0	15,701	38.5	17.0	17.0	4.8	5.7	6.7	3.8	3.0	3.6	49.0	44.5
Borgholm	Kalmar	81.4	7,230	26.8	26.2	21.5	4.5	8.0	3.8	4.0	3.5	1.8	34.6	60.2
Borlänge	Dalarna	80.7	28,333	45.5	18.8	7.3	5.7	4.4	7.1	4.4	3.5	3.2	57.0	36.2
Borås	Västra Götaland	81.7	60,258	36.4	25.4	5.8	7.2	7.9	6.1	4.2	3.2	3.9	46.7	46.2
Botkyrka	Stockholm	76.1	37,661	38.4	27.0	3.3	7.7	6.7	7.2	5.4	2.2	2.1	51.0	44.7
Boxholm	Östergötland	84.2	3,340	50.5	13.5	11.2	2.9	8.0	5.5	3.0	2.5	2.9	59.0	35.6
Bromölla	Skåne	81.3	7,426	51.9	15.9	4.7	5.5	4.5	5.8	2.3	7.4	2.1	60.0	30.5
Bräcke	Jämtland	77.6	4,224	48.2	15.0	14.9	3.0	2.2	9.7	3.2	1.3	2.6	61.0	35.1
Burlöv	Skåne	80.2	8,853	42.3	24.7	3.2	7.4	3.3	4.3	3.1	8.0	3.7	49.7	38.7
Båstad	Skåne	82.7	9,349	18.2	41.8	12.7	7.7	8.4	1.8	3.7	3.6	2.1	23.7	70.6
Dals-Ed	Västra Götaland	78.5	2,747	33.9	19.8	17.1	4.7	12.0	3.1	2.8	1.9	4.7	39.8	53.7
Danderyd	Stockholm	88.5	19,657	7.8	59.7	6.3	10.6	9.4	1.2	3.0	0.7	1.2	12.0	86.1
Degerfors	Örebro	82.3	6,302	57.6	9.8	5.4	3.2	5.2	11.2	2.7	2.9	2.0	71.5	23.6
Dorotea	Västerbotten	76.9	1,854	54.6	8.7	12.5	8.6	3.2	9.0	1.0	1.0	1.3	64.6	33.1
Eda	Värmland	75.3	4,228	45.3	16.1	15.8	3.5	6.1	4.8	2.1	3.3	3.0	52.2	41.5
Ekerö	Stockholm	88.6	14,828	17.1	44.7	7.0	10.3	7.4	3.3	6.6	1.4	2.2	27.0	69.4
Eksjö	Jönköping	82.2	10,378	32.7	23.9	12.2	5.6	13.9	3.7	3.7	2.8	1.6	40.0	55.5
Emmaboda	Kalmar	82.1	5,851	45.2	17.6	13.9	2.8	7.7	4.1	3.5	3.2	2.0	52.8	42.0
Enköping	Uppsala	81.2	23,020	34.2	29.1	12.5	5.2	5.9	3.8	4.4	2.2	2.7	42.3	52.7
Eskilstuna	Södermanland	79.6	53,595	44.1	21.6	6.0	6.9	5.8	5.4	5.4	2.8	2.1	54.8	40.3
Eslöv	Skåne	80.7	17,729	40.1	22.2	9.3	7.0	3.8	3.5	3.1	8.4	2.4	46.8	42.4
Essunga	Västra Götaland	82.6	3,570	29.8	27.4	18.2	4.6	7.5	4.3	3.0	2.9	2.2	37.2	57.8
Fagersta	Västmanland	78.3	7,237	49.9	17.8	4.4	5.1	4.6	9.4	3.0	2.3	3.3	62.4	32.0
Falkenberg	Halland	82.1	24,485	35.1	24.6	14.8	6.7	5.7	3.8	3.9	3.0	2.4	42.8	51.8
Falköping	Västra Götaland	82.7	19,561	36.1	22.4	12.6	4.5	9.6	4.8	3.6	4.2	2.2	44.5	49.1
Falun	Dalarna	82.2	34,442	33.8	25.5	10.5	6.3	5.9	5.9	6.1	2.5	3.6	45.8	48.2
Filipstad	Värmland	77.4	6,551	56.5	14.0	5.9	4.2	3.5	8.9	2.3	3.1	1.6	67.7	27.5
Finspång	Östergötland	83.7	13,301	47.1	18.0	7.0	4.7	7.0	6.6	4.1	2.7	2.8	57.8	36.7
Flen	Södermanland	81.9	9,911	46.5	20.2	8.7	4.9	5.6	5.4	4.3	2.7	1.7	56.1	39.5
Forshaga	Värmland	83.2	7,033	51.2	16.3	7.6	5.0	5.3	5.7	3.1	3.6	2.1	59.9	34.3
Färgelanda	Västra Götaland	80.3	4,081	38.1	17.5	18.7	6.3	5.6	3.7	2.1	4.2	3.6	44.0	48.2
Gagnef	Dalarna	81.5	6,081	38.6	18.2	16.3	4.1	7.3	5.7	4.1	2.7	3.0	48.4	45.9
Gislaved	Jönköping	80.7	16,989	36.7	25.0	10.5	5.4	10.0	3.1	2.7	4.6	2.0	42.5	50.9
Gnesta	Södermanland	82.6	5,990	34.5	26.1	11.3	5.5	5.6	4.9	7.3	2.5	2.3	46.6	48.6
Gnosjö	Jönköping	81.6	5,567	31.7	21.5	7.4	4.0	25.1	2.5	2.3	3.7	1.8	36.5	58.1
Gothenburg	Västra Götaland	79.5	292,726	28.9	26.9	4.5	10.2	6.7	8.7	8.4	2.5	3.1	46.0	48.3
Gotland	Gotland	81.4	35,750	34.9	21.6	19.3	4.4	3.8	6.0	6.3	1.6	2.3	47.1	49.0
Grums	Värmland	78.7	5,591	52.0	16.3	9.5	3.3	5.4	6.4	2.3	2.7	2.1	60.7	34.5
Grästorp	Västra Götaland	83.0	3,649	32.6	29.5	16.4	4.5	6.4	3.6	2.4	2.3	2.4	38.6	56.8
Gullspång	Västra Götaland	82.4	3,440	43.1	17.8	11.2	4.7	7.0	5.3	3.0	3.7	4.3	51.4	40.6
Gällivare	Norrbotten	76.9	11,420	52.8	11.9	2.6	2.4	2.8	17.8	2.9	2.3	4.4	73.6	19.7
Gävle	Gävleborg	80.8	56,766	40.6	22.2	6.2	7.2	4.9	7.5	5.4	3.3	2.8	53.5	40.4
Götene	Västra Götaland	83.8	8,013	38.6	21.0	10.9	5.5	10.8	4.7	3.9	2.6	2.0	47.2	48.3
Habo	Jönköping	87.7	6,251	31.7	24.8	7.0	5.6	19.4	3.4	3.2	3.4	1.5	38.3	56.8
Hagfors	Värmland	79.9	8,321	55.8	11.7	8.3	3.1	3.1	11.1	1.8	3.7	1.5	68.7	26.2
Hallsberg	Örebro	84.0	9,568	49.1	14.7	8.7	4.9	6.6	5.9	3.5	4.6	1.9	58.5	35.0
Hallstahammar	Västmanland	79.3	8,588	49.1	16.0	5.3	5.9	7.2	7.5	3.7	2.8	2.4	60.3	34.5
Halmstad	Halland	82.3	55,509	36.1	27.7	6.8	7.8	6.1	4.4	4.3	2.6	4.2	44.9	48.4
Hammarö	Värmland	85.9	9,078	41.9	25.0	5.6	7.0	6.6	5.7	4.0	2.3	1.9	51.6	44.2
Haninge	Stockholm	80.5	40,247	33.3	32.6	3.9	7.9	5.9	5.9	5.5	2.3	2.8	44.6	50.3
Haparanda	Norrbotten	68.6	4,154	51.4	17.2	12.3	2.3	3.7	6.3	2.1	1.4	3.5	59.8	35.4
Heby	Uppsala	79.6	8,023	36.7	18.9	17.0	5.0	7.1	5.9	3.1	3.8	2.4	45.8	48.1
Hedemora	Dalarna	78.3	9,177	40.8	19.5	12.1	4.1	5.3	7.4	4.7	3.1	3.0	52.9	41.0
Helsingborg	Skåne	79.6	73,765	33.2	31.5	3.8	8.7	5.0	3.5	4.1	6.3	3.9	40.8	49.0
Herrljunga	Västra Götaland	84.2	5,849	31.0	21.3	15.5	6.9	10.6	4.9	3.2	3.6	3.0	39.2	54.3
Hjo	Västra Götaland	83.1	5,621	35.5	25.7	9.1	5.9	10.1	4.4	4.4	3.0	2.0	44.3	50.8
Hofors	Gävleborg	78.6	6,005	51.0	13.7	5.9	5.4	2.8	11.4	3.2	4.0	2.6	65.6	27.8
Huddinge	Stockholm	83.7	48,461	29.1	35.2	4.2	9.2	6.2	5.7	5.4	2.7	2.3	40.3	54.7
Hudiksvall	Gävleborg	78.3	22,153	39.0	17.5	15.9	3.7	5.0	8.5	5.3	2.3	3.0	52.7	42.0
Hultsfred	Kalmar	79.8	8,662	43.8	16.1	14.1	3.8	8.1	5.7	2.9	3.7	2.0	52.4	42.0
Hylte	Halland	80.1	5,965	38.5	21.7	15.7	5.1	6.8	3.3	2.8	4.1	2.0	44.6	49.3
Håbo	Uppsala	83.5	10,746	28.8	39.6	5.9	6.8	6.3	3.6	3.9	2.3	2.7	36.3	58.7
Hällefors	Örebro	79.2	4,540	57.5	12.6	7.6	2.7	3.0	8.6	2.7	3.5	1.9	68.8	25.8
Härjedalen	Jämtland	77.6	6,613	45.7	17.2	12.9	4.7	3.8	8.2	2.3	2.7	2.5	56.2	38.6
Härnösand	Västernorrland	81.9	15,905	39.4	19.1	11.5	5.0	4.9	7.0	5.7	2.2	5.2	52.2	40.5
Härryda	Västra Götaland	85.8	19,272	29.2	29.6	6.9	10.7	7.4	5.4	5.5	2.7	2.6	40.1	54.6
Hässleholm	Skåne	79.4	29,468	35.0	25.3	9.4	6.1	8.6	3.4	3.7	6.4	2.1	42.1	49.4
Höganäs	Skåne	83.7	15,114	27.2	37.3	5.8	8.4	7.8	2.4	4.0	4.2	2.9	33.6	59.3
Högsby	Kalmar	80.7	3,658	44.7	15.8	14.7	4.2	7.1	5.1	2.1	5.2	1.1	51.9	41.8
Hörby	Skåne	78.8	8,504	28.8	26.7	12.4	7.0	6.3	2.4	3.1	8.0	5.1	34.4	52.5
Höör	Skåne	80.4	8,657	30.7	28.2	8.6	7.2	5.7	3.8	5.2	7.7	3.0	39.7	49.7
Jokkmokk	Norrbotten	79.3	3,425	47.8	10.8	5.5	5.8	2.3	14.7	6.5	1.0	5.4	69.0	24.5
Järfälla	Stockholm	83.7	37,156	30.1	34.1	4.1	9.5	6.8	5.6	5.5	2.2	2.1	41.2	54.4
Jönköping	Jönköping	84.2	77,041	34.5	22.9	5.8	6.0	17.0	5.0	4.1	2.6	2.1	43.6	51.6
Kalix	Norrbotten	82.0	10,924	59.9	10.3	7.0	3.3	3.3	7.0	4.7	1.7	2.7	71.6	24.0
Kalmar	Kalmar	84.0	39,428	39.5	24.8	7.6	6.6	6.5	4.8	5.2	3.0	2.0	49.5	45.5
Karlsborg	Västra Götaland	83.9	4,504	39.4	22.1	13.5	6.1	7.4	3.8	2.8	2.6	2.3	46.0	49.1
Karlshamn	Blekinge	82.3	19,809	44.6	19.8	6.5	6.0	4.5	6.7	4.2	6.3	1.4	55.5	36.7
Karlskoga	Örebro	81.5	18,917	49.4	19.8	4.2	4.7	5.3	6.4	3.2	3.0	4.0	58.9	34.1
Karlskrona	Blekinge	84.6	39,497	40.0	23.6	7.1	7.5	5.8	4.5	4.1	5.9	1.6	48.5	44.0
Karlstad	Värmland	83.6	53,554	36.8	25.2	7.5	7.7	6.5	6.0	5.5	2.3	2.5	48.3	46.9
Katrineholm	Södermanland	82.8	20,023	48.0	19.1	6.7	7.2	5.7	4.3	5.2	2.4	1.5	57.5	38.6
Kil	Värmland	82.4	7,167	41.7	21.0	11.0	6.0	6.5	5.2	3.4	3.3	1.9	50.4	44.5
Kinda	Östergötland	84.2	6,279	38.0	20.8	16.2	3.7	8.4	4.2	4.0	2.5	2.3	46.1	49.1
Kiruna	Norrbotten	78.8	13,762	51.8	9.5	3.3	3.1	3.9	15.0	3.7	2.4	7.2	70.5	19.8
Klippan	Skåne	76.4	9,090	38.3	27.0	7.3	5.4	6.5	2.9	2.6	7.5	2.6	43.8	46.2
Knivsta	Uppsala	85.9	7,915	24.3	34.0	10.1	9.9	7.9	3.6	5.5	2.6	2.2	33.4	61.9
Kramfors	Västernorrland	80.8	12,717	50.2	12.8	14.4	3.0	4.1	9.3	3.0	1.4	1.9	62.5	34.3
Kristianstad	Skåne	81.3	46,708	36.5	26.4	7.5	9.8	4.7	3.8	3.7	4.4	3.2	44.0	48.5
Kristinehamn	Värmland	81.9	15,131	43.6	20.6	8.6	6.4	5.5	7.3	3.6	2.5	1.9	54.5	41.1
Krokom	Jämtland	80.1	8,387	37.8	15.7	21.8	3.5	4.1	7.2	5.6	1.6	2.7	50.6	45.1
Kumla	Örebro	84.6	12,011	47.3	16.5	7.4	6.1	8.9	4.7	2.9	4.4	1.8	54.9	38.9
Kungsbacka	Halland	86.8	44,356	21.6	39.7	8.4	9.9	8.4	3.1	3.8	2.1	3.0	28.5	66.4
Kungsör	Västmanland	81.1	4,963	38.8	23.4	10.9	6.1	5.6	5.8	3.7	3.2	2.6	48.2	46.0
Kungälv	Västra Götaland	86.1	24,832	33.0	26.2	7.9	8.8	8.7	5.1	4.5	3.5	2.4	42.6	51.6
Kävlinge	Skåne	86.0	16,912	35.3	31.8	5.6	8.6	4.2	2.2	2.6	7.0	2.8	40.1	50.2
Köping	Västmanland	78.9	14,556	45.1	19.9	8.6	5.6	5.0	6.6	3.3	3.4	2.4	55.1	39.1
Laholm	Halland	81.4	14,180	28.7	27.9	15.8	5.5	6.4	3.7	3.4	6.1	2.3	35.9	55.7
Landskrona	Skåne	80.0	23,056	40.8	24.2	3.0	12.2	2.7	3.9	2.9	8.2	2.1	47.5	42.1
Laxå	Örebro	80.9	3,799	53.6	13.5	7.6	4.3	8.0	5.6	2.0	3.6	1.7	61.2	33.4
Lekeberg	Örebro	83.6	4,519	34.8	18.9	17.2	4.8	10.0	4.1	3.6	4.7	2.0	42.5	50.9
Leksand	Dalarna	82.9	9,834	31.3	25.5	13.6	5.0	10.5	4.8	4.9	1.5	2.9	41.0	54.6
Lerum	Västra Götaland	87.0	22,753	27.5	30.0	6.3	10.2	8.8	5.6	6.4	2.5	2.8	39.4	55.3
Lessebo	Kronoberg	82.6	4,841	48.2	18.2	9.6	4.0	4.1	7.6	3.5	3.0	1.9	59.3	35.8
Lidingö	Stockholm	87.4	27,193	11.5	52.9	6.4	11.9	8.1	2.2	4.3	1.4	1.2	18.0	79.3
Lidköping	Västra Götaland	83.9	23,901	39.5	22.4	8.8	5.4	8.8	6.4	4.3	2.8	1.8	50.1	45.3
Lilla Edet	Västra Götaland	79.6	7,389	42.5	17.7	9.1	5.4	5.5	7.9	3.8	5.2	3.0	54.2	37.7
Lindesberg	Örebro	81.3	14,165	43.5	18.2	12.4	4.4	5.4	5.3	3.6	5.1	2.1	52.4	40.3
Linköping	Östergötland	85.0	88,920	32.8	27.4	7.2	8.6	7.7	4.8	6.2	1.7	3.7	43.8	50.8
Ljungby	Kronoberg	81.8	16,608	35.8	23.2	14.0	5.0	9.1	4.5	3.5	3.2	1.6	43.8	51.3
Ljusdal	Gävleborg	75.3	11,176	38.8	19.2	14.5	4.4	4.9	8.4	3.9	3.1	2.7	51.1	43.1
Ljusnarsberg	Örebro	76.3	3,119	48.4	14.5	10.3	3.1	3.8	8.9	3.4	5.9	1.7	60.7	31.7
Lomma	Skåne	89.7	12,712	22.3	44.6	5.2	11.0	5.3	1.6	2.9	3.9	3.1	26.8	66.1
Ludvika	Dalarna	79.2	15,656	49.2	16.6	6.1	4.4	4.0	10.0	3.2	2.9	3.6	62.4	31.1
Luleå	Norrbotten	84.2	46,768	47.0	17.0	6.6	6.0	4.4	8.5	5.7	1.3	3.5	61.2	34.0
Lund	Skåne	85.8	66,769	25.7	29.8	7.2	12.3	4.4	5.9	9.1	2.5	3.0	40.8	53.7
Lycksele	Västerbotten	79.7	7,794	50.1	12.2	8.7	6.1	9.3	7.3	2.7	1.7	1.9	60.1	36.3
Lysekil	Västra Götaland	81.7	9,269	42.9	20.7	4.8	10.2	6.0	5.5	4.7	2.5	2.7	53.0	41.7
Malmö	Skåne	77.6	155,302	35.2	28.5	2.9	8.9	3.5	5.5	6.1	5.0	4.6	46.8	43.7
Malung	Dalarna	80.8	6,527	37.8	26.4	11.8	6.3	3.7	7.9	2.4	2.1	1.7	48.0	48.2
Malå	Västerbotten	81.2	2,130	54.2	10.4	8.9	6.3	5.3	11.0	1.4	0.7	1.8	66.6	30.9
Mariestad	Västra Götaland	81.4	14,736	42.1	23.6	6.8	4.9	7.7	6.1	3.8	3.0	2.0	52.0	43.0
Mark	Västra Götaland	82.8	20,492	38.3	20.4	11.8	5.3	7.8	6.4	4.0	2.9	3.0	48.7	45.4
Markaryd	Kronoberg	78.9	5,605	41.3	19.8	10.4	3.7	12.6	2.8	2.4	4.8	2.2	46.5	46.5
Mellerud	Västra Götaland	78.9	5,657	34.2	20.5	15.9	5.3	9.4	5.0	3.1	4.3	2.2	42.3	51.2
Mjölby	Östergötland	83.2	15,873	42.9	21.5	8.6	5.5	7.2	4.6	3.2	2.0	4.5	50.8	42.8
Mora	Dalarna	77.7	12,053	36.3	23.3	13.6	4.9	4.8	5.2	4.8	1.8	5.3	46.2	46.6
Motala	Östergötland	82.3	25,859	44.1	21.0	6.2	6.1	5.9	5.8	4.0	2.6	4.3	54.0	39.1
Mullsjö	Jönköping	86.1	4,464	32.6	20.9	7.2	5.0	19.8	4.8	4.1	3.0	2.8	41.4	52.8
Munkedal	Västra Götaland	78.6	6,046	38.3	20.1	14.2	5.9	8.0	4.7	3.3	3.3	2.2	46.3	48.1
Munkfors	Värmland	80.7	2,492	55.8	9.5	9.7	5.5	2.7	9.1	2.4	3.2	2.0	67.3	27.4
Mölndal	Västra Götaland	84.2	36,078	29.9	27.8	5.6	11.6	7.6	6.1	5.5	3.3	2.5	41.6	52.6
Mönsterås	Kalmar	82.5	8,247	46.2	17.3	12.3	4.2	6.7	5.2	2.8	3.7	1.5	54.3	40.5
Mörbylånga	Kalmar	85.5	8,757	34.9	25.2	13.3	6.0	7.1	4.1	4.2	3.0	2.0	43.2	51.7
Nacka	Stockholm	85.9	49,022	19.9	43.8	5.7	10.2	6.3	4.3	6.6	1.3	1.9	30.8	66.0
Nora	Örebro	81.0	6,362	43.1	18.5	9.0	6.7	6.2	5.5	4.6	4.1	2.3	53.2	40.4
Norberg	Västmanland	79.6	3,507	44.5	16.3	6.6	4.5	3.3	12.6	4.2	3.1	4.8	61.3	30.8
Nordanstig	Gävleborg	77.2	5,824	38.3	14.2	19.5	5.0	5.2	7.1	3.5	3.7	3.6	48.9	43.8
Nordmaling	Västerbotten	81.5	4,669	46.2	11.8	15.8	8.3	6.5	6.1	2.5	1.5	1.4	54.7	42.3
Norrköping	Östergötland	81.5	76,195	37.1	26.1	5.6	6.0	6.4	5.8	5.5	2.8	4.6	48.4	44.2
Norrtälje	Stockholm	80.8	33,114	31.5	32.0	9.5	6.7	6.3	4.8	4.9	2.1	2.2	41.1	54.6
Norsjö	Västerbotten	78.9	2,742	49.4	7.3	15.4	4.6	9.1	9.6	1.6	1.0	2.0	60.6	36.3
Nybro	Kalmar	82.0	12,431	44.3	18.9	12.0	3.6	7.0	5.3	2.7	3.0	3.2	52.2	41.5
Nykvarn	Stockholm	84.8	4,905	32.6	34.6	7.1	7.2	5.8	2.8	4.1	2.9	2.9	39.5	54.7
Nyköping	Södermanland	84.1	31,922	40.4	23.6	7.3	6.7	7.5	4.8	5.2	2.4	2.0	50.4	45.2
Nynäshamn	Stockholm	81.7	14,940	34.9	31.3	5.1	6.6	6.0	5.7	5.2	3.0	2.2	45.8	49.1
Nässjö	Jönköping	83.5	18,389	40.9	19.2	8.0	4.1	14.0	5.4	3.5	3.2	1.7	49.7	45.4
Ockelbo	Gävleborg	78.2	3,686	44.5	14.9	16.8	3.1	4.0	9.2	3.2	2.0	2.2	57.0	38.8
Olofström	Blekinge	79.7	7,865	51.6	14.5	6.9	5.3	5.2	6.3	2.4	6.1	1.6	60.4	31.9
Orsa	Dalarna	80.3	4,253	34.8	21.0	15.6	4.2	5.5	6.9	5.1	3.2	3.6	46.9	46.3
Orust	Västra Götaland	83.1	9,773	31.0	25.8	11.7	8.0	8.0	5.1	4.8	2.6	3.1	40.8	53.4
Osby	Skåne	80.1	7,638	42.7	19.2	9.9	5.5	7.8	4.1	2.9	6.5	1.5	49.7	42.3
Oskarshamn	Kalmar	82.0	16,428	44.3	21.2	6.0	4.9	8.5	6.8	2.8	4.0	1.6	53.9	40.5
Ovanåker	Gävleborg	79.9	7,377	37.0	13.1	22.9	4.4	11.4	4.1	2.7	2.0	2.4	43.8	51.8
Oxelösund	Södermanland	81.9	6,944	50.7	18.5	3.4	5.7	4.6	8.1	4.7	2.3	1.9	63.6	32.3
Pajala	Norrbotten	77.1	4,049	45.9	10.0	4.8	2.2	5.6	22.8	2.1	1.4	5.2	70.8	22.6
Partille	Västra Götaland	84.4	20,250	30.4	28.3	4.6	10.7	8.4	6.1	5.2	2.8	3.4	41.8	52.0
Perstorp	Skåne	75.8	3,890	40.9	23.5	7.1	5.6	5.8	5.4	1.7	6.1	4.0	48.0	41.9
Piteå	Norrbotten	85.7	27,145	56.7	10.5	7.1	4.0	5.1	8.5	3.8	0.8	3.6	68.9	26.7
Ragunda	Jämtland	77.0	3,491	45.7	12.4	17.9	2.6	2.8	11.3	2.8	1.9	2.4	59.9	35.7
Robertsfors	Västerbotten	82.5	4,412	39.6	9.9	28.1	3.9	6.4	6.2	3.1	0.8	2.1	48.9	48.3
Ronneby	Blekinge	82.7	18,168	41.7	21.4	9.0	5.9	4.5	6.2	3.4	5.9	2.1	51.3	40.8
Rättvik	Dalarna	79.0	6,776	36.0	22.2	15.3	5.7	5.5	4.1	4.1	2.5	4.5	44.3	48.7
Sala	Västmanland	81.0	13,100	35.5	23.0	14.3	6.3	6.5	5.7	3.5	2.7	2.5	44.7	50.1
Salem	Stockholm	85.5	8,386	28.8	35.5	4.9	9.6	6.4	4.1	5.8	2.6	2.3	38.7	56.5
Sandviken	Gävleborg	80.8	22,822	47.5	17.5	7.8	5.0	4.5	8.9	3.3	2.4	3.1	59.7	34.8
Sigtuna	Stockholm	79.8	20,505	32.9	34.7	5.3	7.6	6.3	4.1	4.5	2.5	2.1	41.5	53.9
Simrishamn	Skåne	79.6	12,155	30.2	30.9	9.7	6.1	6.7	3.5	4.8	4.4	3.7	38.5	53.4
Sjöbo	Skåne	77.7	10,199	32.2	29.6	10.5	5.2	5.9	3.0	2.7	8.9	2.0	37.9	51.2
Skara	Västra Götaland	82.2	11,514	38.4	25.5	9.1	6.1	6.7	4.8	4.1	3.0	2.0	47.4	47.5
Skinnskatteberg	Västmanland	79.3	2,773	48.6	14.4	9.2	5.7	3.8	9.2	3.4	3.0	2.8	61.2	33.1
Skellefteå	Västerbotten	83.3	45,981	50.3	11.0	10.1	6.0	6.3	8.9	4.3	1.4	1.8	63.5	33.4
Skurup	Skåne	80.6	8,461	35.2	29.0	8.8	6.5	4.6	2.8	2.9	7.8	2.4	40.9	48.9
Skövde	Västra Götaland	82.2	31,006	37.5	25.4	8.8	6.7	7.4	5.0	4.0	3.0	2.1	46.5	48.3
Smedjebacken	Dalarna	81.6	6,839	53.7	16.1	7.3	3.2	3.5	7.6	2.9	2.2	3.5	64.2	30.1
Sollefteå	Västernorrland	79.4	13,052	51.1	13.0	10.5	4.0	4.6	9.1	3.6	2.2	1.9	63.8	32.1
Sollentuna	Stockholm	85.8	36,090	21.8	41.1	6.0	10.9	7.6	4.1	5.2	1.3	2.0	31.1	65.6
Solna	Stockholm	82.5	39,117	24.4	37.8	5.1	10.7	5.1	6.0	7.0	1.6	2.3	37.4	58.7
Sorsele	Västerbotten	75.6	1,682	41.3	12.7	17.9	4.2	9.3	8.1	2.9	1.4	2.3	52.3	44.1
Sotenäs	Västra Götaland	82.1	6,087	31.7	30.2	6.4	10.3	9.7	3.7	3.3	2.2	2.7	38.7	56.5
Staffanstorp	Skåne	86.9	12,900	32.0	36.0	5.2	8.5	4.3	2.2	3.3	5.2	3.3	37.8	54.0
Stenungsund	Västra Götaland	83.7	14,056	31.4	27.8	7.4	9.0	7.3	5.1	5.0	2.6	4.3	41.5	51.6
Stockholm	Stockholm	82.4	482,455	23.2	35.1	5.7	10.1	5.0	7.4	9.3	1.6	2.7	39.9	55.8
Storfors	Värmland	81.8	2,761	52.3	15.5	8.4	3.6	4.5	8.6	2.2	2.8	2.0	63.1	32.1
Storuman	Västerbotten	76.7	3,885	40.9	15.6	12.4	6.3	9.9	8.4	2.7	1.2	2.7	52.0	44.2
Strängnäs	Södermanland	83.1	18,922	32.5	32.4	7.6	8.3	6.7	3.7	4.7	2.2	2.0	40.9	54.9
Strömstad	Västra Götaland	75.8	6,048	34.2	21.9	13.8	9.8	6.3	4.9	5.2	1.8	2.2	44.4	51.7
Strömsund	Jämtland	80.3	8,066	48.8	13.9	14.4	2.7	2.9	10.3	2.2	1.9	2.8	61.3	34.0
Sundbyberg	Stockholm	80.4	20,652	29.8	33.4	4.6	9.2	4.4	7.0	7.0	2.1	2.6	43.7	51.6
Sundsvall	Västernorrland	81.8	59,172	42.1	21.0	8.2	7.3	5.1	6.6	4.5	2.8	2.4	53.2	41.6
Sunne	Värmland	81.3	8,355	34.2	23.7	19.9	5.2	5.7	3.9	3.2	2.5	1.7	41.4	54.4
Surahammar	Västmanland	78.3	5,664	54.0	14.4	4.8	5.9	4.2	8.4	3.1	2.5	2.8	65.4	29.3
Svalöv	Skåne	80.4	7,487	35.7	22.9	13.8	5.9	4.3	3.0	3.0	9.7	1.7	41.7	46.9
Svedala	Skåne	85.5	11,650	36.3	30.4	4.6	8.2	3.9	2.2	2.7	9.3	2.4	41.4	47.0
Svenljunga	Västra Götaland	79.2	6,097	34.2	24.0	16.3	6.2	7.7	2.6	2.2	2.9	4.0	38.9	54.2
Säffle	Värmland	79.9	9,766	36.7	20.6	17.1	5.2	7.0	4.2	2.5	3.9	2.8	43.4	49.9
Säter	Dalarna	81.2	6,739	37.3	20.0	15.5	4.9	5.6	6.7	3.8	2.5	3.6	47.9	46.0
Sävsjö	Jönköping	84.2	6,795	30.4	20.4	13.4	3.8	20.9	3.1	1.8	4.8	1.4	35.3	58.5
Söderhamn	Gävleborg	79.2	16,218	45.5	15.1	10.9	4.1	4.9	9.0	3.4	3.6	3.4	57.9	35.1
Söderköping	Östergötland	84.1	8,890	30.9	28.6	11.7	5.3	7.6	4.4	5.3	2.7	3.5	40.5	53.2
Södertälje	Stockholm	77.5	42,920	36.0	26.8	5.4	7.1	7.2	5.6	6.4	1.9	3.5	48.0	46.6
Sölvesborg	Blekinge	82.1	10,442	41.1	27.2	5.6	4.7	5.1	4.6	2.3	7.9	1.7	48.0	42.5
Tanum	Västra Götaland	80.1	7,423	25.2	26.8	19.0	8.7	7.1	3.5	4.7	2.2	2.7	33.5	61.7
Tibro	Västra Götaland	81.9	6,563	40.3	19.7	9.8	7.0	10.3	4.6	2.9	3.3	2.3	47.7	46.7
Tidaholm	Västra Götaland	83.7	7,899	48.7	17.3	8.6	4.2	7.2	5.6	3.0	3.3	2.0	57.3	37.4
Tierp	Uppsala	79.8	12,006	45.8	14.7	14.3	5.6	5.5	5.5	3.6	3.1	2.0	54.8	40.0
Timrå	Västernorrland	80.9	10,811	53.4	12.6	8.7	4.6	4.4	7.7	2.8	3.5	2.3	63.9	30.3
Tingsryd	Kronoberg	80.2	7,800	33.7	26.2	15.9	4.2	7.6	4.0	2.9	3.9	1.6	40.7	53.8
Tomelilla	Skåne	77.1	7,525	32.7	27.6	11.8	5.2	5.3	3.2	3.3	8.4	2.5	39.2	49.9
Torsby	Värmland	78.5	7,842	44.7	21.4	11.7	3.2	3.9	8.3	2.4	2.9	1.4	55.5	40.2
Torsås	Kalmar	81.4	4,494	37.0	20.4	17.5	3.8	8.9	3.1	3.2	4.0	2.1	43.3	50.6
Tranemo	Västra Götaland	83.0	7,238	36.1	21.2	17.6	5.8	6.5	3.5	3.1	3.9	2.4	42.7	51.0
Tranås	Jönköping	82.2	11,105	40.2	22.0	6.9	5.3	12.5	4.6	3.8	2.9	1.8	48.6	46.7
Trelleborg	Skåne	81.0	24,241	39.8	23.8	4.9	6.4	5.9	2.6	2.8	9.0	4.9	45.1	41.0
Trollhättan	Västra Götaland	82.1	32,139	49.6	18.8	5.6	6.8	5.5	5.4	4.3	2.0	2.1	59.2	36.7
Trosa	Södermanland	85.5	6,739	31.0	35.2	6.3	7.9	7.0	3.4	4.9	1.9	2.4	39.3	56.3
Tyresö	Stockholm	85.5	24,113	26.2	38.6	4.9	9.3	5.9	4.9	6.1	1.5	2.6	37.1	58.8
Täby	Stockholm	87.9	38,843	13.8	53.8	5.2	11.2	7.5	2.1	3.8	1.1	1.5	19.7	77.7
Töreboda	Västra Götaland	78.4	5,498	39.9	21.2	14.0	4.0	6.9	5.2	3.1	3.0	2.7	48.1	46.2
Uddevalla	Västra Götaland	81.9	30,853	38.9	23.1	6.1	7.5	7.9	5.2	4.7	3.6	3.1	48.7	44.6
Ulricehamn	Västra Götaland	83.2	14,015	30.7	24.0	14.7	5.7	9.8	4.0	4.2	2.9	4.0	38.8	54.2
Umeå	Västerbotten	84.8	70,674	38.6	16.5	10.5	6.9	5.6	8.6	9.1	0.9	3.3	56.2	39.5
Upplands-Bro	Stockholm	81.8	12,105	32.4	31.9	4.4	7.7	8.4	5.7	5.0	2.6	1.9	43.1	52.3
Upplands Väsby	Stockholm	80.2	21,214	30.6	34.5	4.0	9.0	6.3	5.8	5.2	2.5	2.1	41.6	53.8
Uppsala	Uppsala	84.0	116,207	26.9	26.9	8.6	11.3	7.0	6.5	7.8	2.0	3.0	41.2	53.8
Uppvidinge	Kronoberg	80.7	5,595	37.8	20.5	15.9	3.4	6.5	6.0	2.7	5.7	1.5	46.5	46.3
Vadstena	Östergötland	84.3	4,973	36.0	27.9	8.1	5.4	8.0	4.3	4.2	2.6	3.4	44.5	49.5
Vaggeryd	Jönköping	83.4	7,789	37.3	19.8	8.4	4.6	19.1	3.5	2.5	3.8	1.1	43.3	51.8
Valdemarsvik	Östergötland	82.5	5,214	40.2	22.9	14.7	4.2	6.6	4.0	2.7	2.5	2.3	46.8	48.4
Vallentuna	Stockholm	85.9	16,418	20.9	42.1	7.5	8.8	7.1	3.4	6.1	1.8	2.3	30.4	65.5
Vansbro	Dalarna	79.4	4,247	39.2	16.6	15.9	3.6	9.3	7.4	2.3	2.9	2.7	48.9	45.5
Vara	Västra Götaland	81.3	9,913	32.1	28.6	16.0	4.9	7.8	4.1	2.3	2.2	1.9	38.6	57.2
Varberg	Halland	83.9	34,975	34.8	25.7	12.3	6.7	6.2	4.7	4.3	2.8	2.5	43.8	50.9
Vaxholm	Stockholm	88.2	6,472	17.2	46.6	6.9	8.9	7.8	2.9	6.9	1.1	1.7	27.0	70.1
Vellinge	Skåne	89.5	21,383	16.8	55.9	3.7	8.8	5.6	1.1	1.9	4.2	2.0	19.8	74.0
Vetlanda	Jönköping	82.7	16,385	35.9	19.7	13.0	5.5	14.4	4.4	3.2	2.7	1.3	43.5	52.5
Vilhelmina	Västerbotten	80.1	4,502	47.0	8.9	12.9	6.0	10.0	8.9	2.3	1.4	2.5	58.3	37.8
Vimmerby	Kalmar	81.1	9,499	39.5	18.6	17.2	4.1	8.3	4.1	3.5	3.1	1.7	47.1	48.1
Vindeln	Västerbotten	78.2	3,480	39.2	16.4	19.4	5.9	8.5	4.7	2.4	1.2	2.3	46.3	50.2
Vingåker	Södermanland	83.3	5,704	51.0	18.4	7.8	4.1	6.1	4.0	4.5	2.8	1.3	59.4	36.4
Vårgårda	Västra Götaland	84.5	6,663	29.5	18.4	13.6	7.6	16.6	4.2	4.7	3.2	2.2	38.4	56.2
Vänersborg	Västra Götaland	82.1	22,917	42.0	19.4	8.5	6.7	7.5	5.9	4.8	2.6	2.5	52.7	42.1
Vännäs	Västerbotten	80.4	5,044	42.5	12.5	18.2	4.4	7.1	8.3	4.3	0.9	1.8	55.1	42.2
Värmdö	Stockholm	85.8	20,625	22.4	42.9	5.5	8.4	6.2	4.3	6.4	2.1	1.8	33.1	63.0
Värnamo	Jönköping	82.7	19,987	35.9	22.1	10.6	5.0	15.5	3.0	2.8	3.8	1.3	41.7	53.2
Västervik	Kalmar	80.4	22,846	45.3	20.1	9.3	6.3	5.8	5.5	4.2	2.1	1.5	55.0	41.4
Västerås	Västmanland	81.7	79,704	35.9	26.7	5.3	10.1	6.0	5.3	4.9	2.2	3.5	46.1	48.2
Växjö	Kronoberg	84.7	49,879	33.9	26.7	8.7	7.2	7.7	5.5	5.5	2.8	2.0	44.9	50.4
Ydre	Östergötland	85.6	2,506	30.8	20.3	19.0	4.3	14.4	3.6	3.8	2.6	1.2	38.2	58.0
Ystad	Skåne	80.9	17,254	36.8	31.7	6.4	6.5	5.1	2.7	3.3	4.6	3.0	42.8	49.6
Åmål	Västra Götaland	79.3	7,592	44.2	18.4	11.1	5.1	6.4	5.8	4.2	2.4	2.5	54.1	41.0
Ånge	Västernorrland	78.5	6,455	48.6	14.0	12.1	3.4	5.0	8.5	2.6	3.3	2.5	59.7	34.5
Åre	Jämtland	79.6	5,952	31.6	23.2	18.8	4.3	5.0	6.3	6.8	1.5	2.5	44.7	51.3
Årjäng	Värmland	73.7	4,948	31.9	19.3	18.7	8.2	10.0	4.6	2.3	2.9	2.0	38.9	56.2
Åsele	Västerbotten	80.7	2,071	50.6	9.9	16.3	4.8	6.5	7.0	1.1	1.6	2.3	58.6	37.5
Åstorp	Skåne	76.7	7,411	45.3	23.4	5.7	5.1	5.0	2.9	1.8	8.4	2.4	50.0	39.2
Åtvidaberg	Östergötland	84.0	7,411	46.4	19.8	10.3	4.2	7.0	4.6	3.1	2.2	2.4	54.2	41.3
Älmhult	Kronoberg	81.3	9,432	37.5	24.4	12.7	4.9	7.9	3.4	3.5	4.7	1.1	44.4	49.8
Älvdalen	Dalarna	76.7	4,419	42.4	17.6	14.5	4.1	5.3	4.7	2.7	3.3	5.5	49.7	41.4
Älvkarleby	Uppsala	82.5	5,558	54.4	14.6	4.6	5.0	3.7	7.6	3.5	3.8	2.9	65.4	27.9
Älvsbyn	Norrbotten	82.0	5,480	56.7	7.8	8.6	3.1	4.7	11.3	2.1	1.6	4.4	70.0	24.1
Ängelholm	Skåne	81.9	24,271	27.5	35.8	7.1	7.2	7.4	2.7	3.7	4.7	4.0	33.9	57.4
Öckerö	Västra Götaland	88.1	7,997	24.0	28.4	3.4	9.3	21.7	4.1	4.5	2.3	2.5	32.6	62.7
Ödeshög	Östergötland	82.8	3,407	35.7	20.8	12.8	4.0	13.6	3.8	3.8	2.8	2.6	43.3	51.2
Örebro	Örebro	83.7	80,630	38.0	21.0	6.3	8.7	8.1	6.0	6.0	3.5	2.4	50.0	44.1
Örkelljunga	Skåne	78.3	5,500	29.7	26.5	7.8	6.0	13.9	2.4	1.9	7.5	4.4	34.0	54.1
Örnsköldsvik	Västernorrland	82.8	35,305	49.2	14.9	13.0	4.4	8.4	4.0	2.8	1.0	2.3	56.1	40.7
Östersund	Jämtland	81.0	36,741	38.2	19.0	15.8	5.0	3.8	8.1	6.2	1.3	2.6	52.5	43.5
Österåker	Stockholm	85.5	22,580	22.8	42.3	5.6	9.3	7.3	3.6	5.6	1.8	1.7	31.9	64.9
Östhammar	Uppsala	79.4	12,914	39.4	23.5	13.1	6.0	5.5	4.4	3.7	2.3	2.0	47.5	48.1
Östra Göinge	Skåne	80.2	8,233	46.0	18.5	8.2	5.7	7.0	3.7	2.7	5.9	2.4	52.3	39.5
Överkalix	Norrbotten	78.5	2,440	58.5	7.1	11.4	2.5	2.6	12.6	2.1	0.8	2.4	73.2	23.7
Övertorneå	Norrbotten	74.9	2,785	43.9	12.7	14.9	3.2	4.6	11.7	2.7	1.0	5.3	58.3	35.4
Total		82.0	5,551,278	35.0	26.2	7.9	7.5	6.6	5.9	5.2	2.9	2.7	46.1	48.2
Source: val.se

== Municipal results ==
Votes by municipality. The municipalities are the color of the party that got the most votes within the coalition that won relative majority.

Votes by municipality as a scale from red/Red-green bloc to blue/Alliance for Sweden.

Cartogram of the vote with each municipality rescaled in proportion to the number of valid votes. Deeper blue represents a relative majority for Alliance for Sweden, brighter red represents a relative majority for the Red-Green bloc.

Map showing the voting shifts from the 2002 to the 2006 election. Darker blue indicates a municipality voted more towards the parties that form Alliance for Sweden. Darker red indicates a municipality voted more towards the parties that form the red-green bloc.

=== Blekinge ===
Location	Turnout	Share	Votes	S	M	C	FP	KD	V	MP	SD	Other	Left	Right
Karlshamn	82.3	20.7	19,809	44.6	19.8	6.5	6.0	4.5	6.7	4.2	6.3	1.4	55.5	36.7
Karlskrona	84.6	41.2	39,497	40.0	23.6	7.1	7.5	5.8	4.5	4.1	5.9	1.6	48.5	44.0
Olofström	79.7	8.2	7,865	51.6	14.5	6.9	5.3	5.2	6.3	2.4	6.1	1.6	60.4	31.9
Ronneby	82.7	19.0	18,168	41.7	21.4	9.0	5.9	4.5	6.2	3.4	5.9	2.1	51.3	40.8
Sölvesborg	82.1	10.9	10,442	41.1	27.2	5.6	4.7	5.1	4.6	2.3	7.9	1.7	48.0	42.5
Total	83.1	1.7	95,781	42.1	22.0	7.2	6.4	5.2	5.4	3.7	6.2	1.6	51.4	40.8
Source: val.se

=== Dalarna ===
Location	Turnout	Share	Votes	S	M	C	FP	KD	V	MP	SD	Other	Left	Right
Avesta	80.6	8.1	13,734	46.1	19.3	8.4	4.9	4.4	6.6	3.4	4.0	2.8	56.2	37.0
Borlänge	80.7	16.8	28,333	45.5	18.8	7.3	5.7	4.4	7.1	4.4	3.5	3.2	57.0	36.2
Falun	82.2	20.4	34,442	33.8	25.5	10.5	6.3	5.9	5.9	6.1	2.5	3.6	45.8	48.2
Gagnef	81.5	3.6	6,081	38.6	18.2	16.3	4.1	7.3	5.7	4.1	2.7	3.0	48.4	45.9
Hedemora	78.3	5.4	9,177	40.8	19.5	12.1	4.1	5.3	7.4	4.7	3.1	3.0	52.9	41.0
Leksand	82.9	5.8	9,834	31.3	25.5	13.6	5.0	10.5	4.8	4.9	1.5	2.9	41.0	54.6
Ludvika	79.2	9.3	15,656	49.2	16.6	6.1	4.4	4.0	10.0	3.2	2.9	3.6	62.4	31.1
Malung	80.8	3.9	6,527	37.8	26.4	11.8	6.3	3.7	7.9	2.4	2.1	1.7	48.0	48.2
Mora	77.7	7.1	12,053	36.3	23.3	13.6	4.9	4.8	5.2	4.8	1.8	5.3	46.2	46.6
Orsa	80.3	2.5	4,253	34.8	21.0	15.6	4.2	5.5	6.9	5.1	3.2	3.6	46.9	46.3
Rättvik	79.0	4.0	6,776	36.0	22.2	15.3	5.7	5.5	4.1	4.1	2.5	4.5	44.3	48.7
Smedjebacken	81.6	4.0	6,839	53.7	16.1	7.3	3.2	3.5	7.6	2.9	2.2	3.5	64.2	30.1
Säter	81.2	4.0	6,739	37.3	20.0	15.5	4.9	5.6	6.7	3.8	2.5	3.6	47.9	46.0
Vansbro	79.4	2.5	4,247	39.2	16.6	15.9	3.6	9.3	7.4	2.3	2.9	2.7	48.9	45.5
Älvdalen	76.7	2.6	4,419	42.4	17.6	14.5	4.1	5.3	4.7	2.7	3.3	5.5	49.7	41.4
Total	80.5	3.0	169,110	40.3	21.1	10.8	5.1	5.4	6.7	4.4	2.8	3.5	51.3	42.4
Source: val.se

=== Gotland ===
Location	Turnout	Share	Votes	S	M	C	FP	KD	V	MP	SD	Other	Left	Right
Gotland	81.4	100.0	35,750	34.9	21.6	19.3	4.4	3.8	6.0	6.3	1.6	2.3	47.1	49.0
Total	81.4	0.6	35,750	34.9	21.6	19.3	4.4	3.8	6.0	6.3	1.6	2.3	47.1	49.0
Source: val.se

=== Gävleborg ===
Location	Turnout	Share	Votes	S	M	C	FP	KD	V	MP	SD	Other	Left	Right
Bollnäs	77.0	9.4	15,701	38.5	17.0	17.0	4.8	5.7	6.7	3.8	3.0	3.6	49.0	44.5
Gävle	80.8	33.8	56,766	40.6	22.2	6.2	7.2	4.9	7.5	5.4	3.3	2.8	53.5	40.4
Hofors	78.6	3.6	6,005	51.0	13.7	5.9	5.4	2.8	11.4	3.2	4.0	2.6	65.6	27.8
Hudiksvall	78.3	13.2	22,153	39.0	17.5	15.9	3.7	5.0	8.5	5.3	2.3	3.0	52.7	42.0
Ljusdal	75.3	6.7	11,176	38.8	19.2	14.5	4.4	4.9	8.4	3.9	3.1	2.7	51.1	43.1
Nordanstig	77.2	3.5	5,824	38.3	14.2	19.5	5.0	5.2	7.1	3.5	3.7	3.6	48.9	43.8
Ockelbo	78.2	2.2	3,686	44.5	14.9	16.8	3.1	4.0	9.2	3.2	2.0	2.2	57.0	38.8
Ovanåker	79.9	4.4	7,377	37.0	13.1	22.9	4.4	11.4	4.1	2.7	2.0	2.4	43.8	51.8
Sandviken	80.8	13.6	22,822	47.5	17.5	7.8	5.0	4.5	8.9	3.3	2.4	3.1	59.7	34.8
Söderhamn	79.2	9.7	16,218	45.5	15.1	10.9	4.1	4.9	9.0	3.4	3.6	3.4	57.9	35.1
Total	79.3	3.0	167,728	41.7	18.4	11.1	5.3	5.1	7.9	4.3	3.0	3.0	54.0	40.0
Source: val.se

=== Halland ===
Location	Turnout	Share	Votes	S	M	C	FP	KD	V	MP	SD	Other	Left	Right
Falkenberg	82.1	13.6	24,485	35.1	24.6	14.8	6.7	5.7	3.8	3.9	3.0	2.4	42.8	51.8
Halmstad	82.3	30.9	55,509	36.1	27.7	6.8	7.8	6.1	4.4	4.3	2.6	4.2	44.9	48.4
Hylte	80.1	3.3	5,965	38.5	21.7	15.7	5.1	6.8	3.3	2.8	4.1	2.0	44.6	49.3
Kungsbacka	86.8	24.7	44,356	21.6	39.7	8.4	9.9	8.4	3.1	3.8	2.1	3.0	28.5	66.4
Laholm	81.4	7.9	14,180	28.7	27.9	15.8	5.5	6.4	3.7	3.4	6.1	2.3	35.9	55.7
Varberg	83.9	19.5	34,975	34.8	25.7	12.3	6.7	6.2	4.7	4.3	2.8	2.5	43.8	50.9
Total	83.5	3.2	179,470	31.6	29.7	10.4	7.7	6.7	4.0	4.0	2.9	3.1	39.6	54.4
Source: val.se

=== Jämtland ===
Location	Turnout	Share	Votes	S	M	C	FP	KD	V	MP	SD	Other	Left	Right
Berg	77.1	5.8	4,544	35.9	16.4	24.3	2.2	4.2	7.7	4.3	1.7	3.4	47.9	47.0
Bräcke	77.6	5.4	4,224	48.2	15.0	14.9	3.0	2.2	9.7	3.2	1.3	2.6	61.0	35.1
Härjedalen	77.6	8.5	6,613	45.7	17.2	12.9	4.7	3.8	8.2	2.3	2.7	2.5	56.2	38.6
Krokom	80.1	10.8	8,387	37.8	15.7	21.8	3.5	4.1	7.2	5.6	1.6	2.7	50.6	45.1
Ragunda	77.0	4.5	3,491	45.7	12.4	17.9	2.6	2.8	11.3	2.8	1.9	2.4	59.9	35.7
Strömsund	80.3	10.3	8,066	48.8	13.9	14.4	2.7	2.9	10.3	2.2	1.9	2.8	61.3	34.0
Åre	79.6	7.6	5,952	31.6	23.2	18.8	4.3	5.0	6.3	6.8	1.5	2.5	44.7	51.3
Östersund	81.0	47.1	36,741	38.2	19.0	15.8	5.0	3.8	8.1	6.2	1.3	2.6	52.5	43.5
Total	79.8	1.4	78,018	40.2	17.6	16.8	4.1	3.7	8.3	5.0	1.6	2.7	53.5	42.3
Source: val.se

=== Jönköping ===
Location	Turnout	Share	Votes	S	M	C	FP	KD	V	MP	SD	Other	Left	Right
Aneby	84.6	2.0	4,160	31.5	17.6	13.1	4.9	22.0	3.2	2.8	3.3	1.6	37.5	57.6
Eksjö	82.2	5.1	10,378	32.7	23.9	12.2	5.6	13.9	3.7	3.7	2.8	1.6	40.0	55.5
Gislaved	80.7	8.3	16,989	36.7	25.0	10.5	5.4	10.0	3.1	2.7	4.6	2.0	42.5	50.9
Gnosjö	81.6	2.7	5,567	31.7	21.5	7.4	4.0	25.1	2.5	2.3	3.7	1.8	36.5	58.1
Habo	87.7	3.0	6,251	31.7	24.8	7.0	5.6	19.4	3.4	3.2	3.4	1.5	38.3	56.8
Jönköping	84.2	37.5	77,041	34.5	22.9	5.8	6.0	17.0	5.0	4.1	2.6	2.1	43.6	51.6
Mullsjö	86.1	2.2	4,464	32.6	20.9	7.2	5.0	19.8	4.8	4.1	3.0	2.8	41.4	52.8
Nässjö	83.5	9.0	18,389	40.9	19.2	8.0	4.1	14.0	5.4	3.5	3.2	1.7	49.7	45.4
Sävsjö	84.2	3.3	6,795	30.4	20.4	13.4	3.8	20.9	3.1	1.8	4.8	1.4	35.3	58.5
Tranås	82.2	5.4	11,105	40.2	22.0	6.9	5.3	12.5	4.6	3.8	2.9	1.8	48.6	46.7
Vaggeryd	83.4	3.8	7,789	37.3	19.8	8.4	4.6	19.1	3.5	2.5	3.8	1.1	43.3	51.8
Vetlanda	82.7	8.0	16,385	35.9	19.7	13.0	5.5	14.4	4.4	3.2	2.7	1.3	43.5	52.5
Värnamo	82.7	9.7	19,987	35.9	22.1	10.6	5.0	15.5	3.0	2.8	3.8	1.3	41.7	53.2
Total	83.4	3.7	205,300	35.4	22.1	8.4	5.4	16.1	4.3	3.4	3.2	1.8	43.1	51.9
Source: val.se

=== Kalmar ===
Location	Turnout	Share	Votes	S	M	C	FP	KD	V	MP	SD	Other	Left	Right
Borgholm	81.4	4.9	7,230	26.8	26.2	21.5	4.5	8.0	3.8	4.0	3.5	1.8	34.6	60.2
Emmaboda	82.1	4.0	5,851	45.2	17.6	13.9	2.8	7.7	4.1	3.5	3.2	2.0	52.8	42.0
Hultsfred	79.8	5.9	8,662	43.8	16.1	14.1	3.8	8.1	5.7	2.9	3.7	2.0	52.4	42.0
Högsby	80.7	2.5	3,658	44.7	15.8	14.7	4.2	7.1	5.1	2.1	5.2	1.1	51.9	41.8
Kalmar	84.0	26.7	39,428	39.5	24.8	7.6	6.6	6.5	4.8	5.2	3.0	2.0	49.5	45.5
Mönsterås	82.5	5.6	8,247	46.2	17.3	12.3	4.2	6.7	5.2	2.8	3.7	1.5	54.3	40.5
Mörbylånga	85.5	5.9	8,757	34.9	25.2	13.3	6.0	7.1	4.1	4.2	3.0	2.0	43.2	51.7
Nybro	82.0	8.4	12,431	44.3	18.9	12.0	3.6	7.0	5.3	2.7	3.0	3.2	52.2	41.5
Oskarshamn	82.0	11.1	16,428	44.3	21.2	6.0	4.9	8.5	6.8	2.8	4.0	1.6	53.9	40.5
Torsås	81.4	3.0	4,494	37.0	20.4	17.5	3.8	8.9	3.1	3.2	4.0	2.1	43.3	50.6
Vimmerby	81.1	6.4	9,499	39.5	18.6	17.2	4.1	8.3	4.1	3.5	3.1	1.7	47.1	48.1
Västervik	80.4	15.5	22,846	45.3	20.1	9.3	6.3	5.8	5.5	4.2	2.1	1.5	55.0	41.4
Total	82.2	2.7	147,531	41.4	21.3	11.1	5.2	7.1	5.0	3.9	3.2	1.9	50.2	44.7
Source: val.se

=== Kronoberg ===
The leftist bloc won Markaryd by one vote, even though both blocs' results were rounded to 46.5%.

Location	Turnout	Share	Votes	S	M	C	FP	KD	V	MP	SD	Other	Left	Right
Alvesta	82.8	10.4	11,567	36.9	24.1	13.0	5.1	7.5	4.4	3.2	3.8	2.0	44.5	49.7
Lessebo	82.6	4.3	4,841	48.2	18.2	9.6	4.0	4.1	7.6	3.5	3.0	1.9	59.3	35.8
Ljungby	81.8	14.9	16,608	35.8	23.2	14.0	5.0	9.1	4.5	3.5	3.2	1.6	43.8	51.3
Markaryd	78.9	5.0	5,605	41.3	19.8	10.4	3.7	12.6	2.8	2.4	4.8	2.2	46.5	46.5
Tingsryd	80.2	7.0	7,800	33.7	26.2	15.9	4.2	7.6	4.0	2.9	3.9	1.6	40.7	53.8
Uppvidinge	80.7	5.0	5,595	37.8	20.5	15.9	3.4	6.5	6.0	2.7	5.7	1.5	46.5	46.3
Växjö	84.7	44.8	49,879	33.9	26.7	8.7	7.2	7.7	5.5	5.5	2.8	2.0	44.9	50.4
Älmhult	81.3	8.5	9,432	37.5	24.4	12.7	4.9	7.9	3.4	3.5	4.7	1.1	44.4	49.8
Total	82.8	2.0	111,327	36.0	24.7	11.3	5.7	7.9	4.9	4.2	3.5	1.8	45.1	49.6
Source: val.se

=== Norrbotten ===
Location	Turnout	Share	Votes	S	M	C	FP	KD	V	MP	SD	Other	Left	Right
Arjeplog	78.3	1.2	1,955	45.0	10.7	10.3	6.1	4.8	14.5	3.2	1.7	3.7	62.6	31.9
Arvidsjaur	81.9	2.8	4,438	57.5	10.5	7.5	3.9	2.1	12.5	1.7	1.0	3.3	71.6	24.0
Boden	83.0	11.4	17,831	48.9	18.0	5.5	4.2	4.7	8.8	2.9	1.9	5.1	60.7	32.4
Gällivare	76.9	7.3	11,420	52.8	11.9	2.6	2.4	2.8	17.8	2.9	2.3	4.4	73.6	19.7
Haparanda	68.6	2.7	4,154	51.4	17.2	12.3	2.3	3.7	6.3	2.1	1.4	3.5	59.8	35.4
Jokkmokk	79.3	2.2	3,425	47.8	10.8	5.5	5.8	2.3	14.7	6.5	1.0	5.4	69.0	24.5
Kalix	82.0	7.0	10,924	59.9	10.3	7.0	3.3	3.3	7.0	4.7	1.7	2.7	71.6	24.0
Kiruna	78.8	8.8	13,762	51.8	9.5	3.3	3.1	3.9	15.0	3.7	2.4	7.2	70.5	19.8
Luleå	84.2	29.9	46,768	47.0	17.0	6.6	6.0	4.4	8.5	5.7	1.3	3.5	61.2	34.0
Pajala	77.1	2.6	4,049	45.9	10.0	4.8	2.2	5.6	22.8	2.1	1.4	5.2	70.8	22.6
Piteå	85.7	17.3	27,145	56.7	10.5	7.1	4.0	5.1	8.5	3.8	0.8	3.6	68.9	26.7
Älvsbyn	82.0	3.5	5,480	56.7	7.8	8.6	3.1	4.7	11.3	2.1	1.6	4.4	70.0	24.1
Överkalix	78.5	1.6	2,440	58.5	7.1	11.4	2.5	2.6	12.6	2.1	0.8	2.4	73.2	23.7
Övertorneå	74.9	1.8	2,785	43.9	12.7	14.9	3.2	4.6	11.7	2.7	1.0	5.3	58.3	35.4
Total	81.8	2.8	156,576	51.5	13.4	6.4	4.3	4.2	10.5	4.1	1.5	4.2	66.1	28.3
Source: val.se

=== Skåne ===
==== Malmö ====
Location	Turnout	Share	Votes	S	M	C	FP	KD	V	MP	SD	Other	Left	Right
Malmö	77.6	100.0	155,302	35.2	28.5	2.9	8.9	3.5	5.5	6.1	5.0	4.6	46.8	43.7
Total	77.6	2.8	155,302	35.2	28.5	2.9	8.9	3.5	5.5	6.1	5.0	4.6	46.8	43.7
Source: val.se

==== Skåne NE ====
Location	Turnout	Share	Votes	S	M	C	FP	KD	V	MP	SD	Other	Left	Right
Bromölla	81.3	4.2	7,426	51.9	15.9	4.7	5.5	4.5	5.8	2.3	7.4	2.1	60.0	30.5
Båstad	82.7	5.2	9,349	18.2	41.8	12.7	7.7	8.4	1.8	3.7	3.6	2.1	23.7	70.6
Hässleholm	79.4	16.5	29,468	35.0	25.3	9.4	6.1	8.6	3.4	3.7	6.4	2.1	42.1	49.4
Klippan	76.4	5.1	9,090	38.3	27.0	7.3	5.4	6.5	2.9	2.6	7.5	2.6	43.8	46.2
Kristianstad	81.3	26.1	46,708	36.5	26.4	7.5	9.8	4.7	3.8	3.7	4.4	3.2	44.0	48.5
Osby	80.1	4.3	7,638	42.7	19.2	9.9	5.5	7.8	4.1	2.9	6.5	1.5	49.7	42.3
Perstorp	75.8	2.2	3,890	40.9	23.5	7.1	5.6	5.8	5.4	1.7	6.1	4.0	48.0	41.9
Simrishamn	79.6	6.8	12,155	30.2	30.9	9.7	6.1	6.7	3.5	4.8	4.4	3.7	38.5	53.4
Tomelilla	77.1	4.2	7,525	32.7	27.6	11.8	5.2	5.3	3.2	3.3	8.4	2.5	39.2	49.9
Åstorp	76.7	4.1	7,411	45.3	23.4	5.7	5.1	5.0	2.9	1.8	8.4	2.4	50.0	39.2
Ängelholm	81.9	13.6	24,271	27.5	35.8	7.1	7.2	7.4	2.7	3.7	4.7	4.0	33.9	57.4
Örkelljunga	78.3	3.1	5,500	29.7	26.5	7.8	6.0	13.9	2.4	1.9	7.5	4.4	34.0	54.1
Östra Göinge	80.2	4.6	8,233	46.0	18.5	8.2	5.7	7.0	3.7	2.7	5.9	2.4	52.3	39.5
Total	80.1	3.2	178,664	35.2	27.4	8.3	7.1	6.7	3.4	3.4	5.6	2.9	42.0	49.5
Source: val.se

==== Skåne S ====
Location	Turnout	Share	Votes	S	M	C	FP	KD	V	MP	SD	Other	Left	Right
Burlöv	80.2	4.2	8,853	42.3	24.7	3.2	7.4	3.3	4.3	3.1	8.0	3.7	49.7	38.7
Kävlinge	86.0	8.0	16,912	35.3	31.8	5.6	8.6	4.2	2.2	2.6	7.0	2.8	40.1	50.2
Lomma	89.7	6.0	12,712	22.3	44.6	5.2	11.0	5.3	1.6	2.9	3.9	3.1	26.8	66.1
Lund	85.8	31.6	66,769	25.7	29.8	7.2	12.3	4.4	5.9	9.1	2.5	3.0	40.8	53.7
Sjöbo	77.7	4.8	10,199	32.2	29.6	10.5	5.2	5.9	3.0	2.7	8.9	2.0	37.9	51.2
Skurup	80.6	4.0	8,461	35.2	29.0	8.8	6.5	4.6	2.8	2.9	7.8	2.4	40.9	48.9
Staffanstorp	86.9	6.1	12,900	32.0	36.0	5.2	8.5	4.3	2.2	3.3	5.2	3.3	37.8	54.0
Svedala	85.5	5.5	11,650	36.3	30.4	4.6	8.2	3.9	2.2	2.7	9.3	2.4	41.4	47.0
Trelleborg	81.0	11.5	24,241	39.8	23.8	4.9	6.4	5.9	2.6	2.8	9.0	4.9	45.1	41.0
Vellinge	89.5	10.1	21,383	16.8	55.9	3.7	8.8	5.6	1.1	1.9	4.2	2.0	19.8	74.0
Ystad	80.9	8.2	17,254	36.8	31.7	6.4	6.5	5.1	2.7	3.3	4.6	3.0	42.8	49.6
Total	84.6	3.8	211,334	30.3	33.1	6.0	9.2	4.8	3.5	4.8	5.3	3.1	38.5	53.1
Source: val.se

==== Skåne W ====
Location	Turnout	Share	Votes	S	M	C	FP	KD	V	MP	SD	Other	Left	Right
Bjuv	76.9	4.7	7,619	48.2	20.7	4.4	4.9	4.3	3.0	2.0	10.3	2.3	53.2	34.3
Eslöv	80.7	10.9	17,729	40.1	22.2	9.3	7.0	3.8	3.5	3.1	8.4	2.4	46.8	42.4
Helsingborg	79.6	45.6	73,765	33.2	31.5	3.8	8.7	5.0	3.5	4.1	6.3	3.9	40.8	49.0
Höganäs	83.7	9.3	15,114	27.2	37.3	5.8	8.4	7.8	2.4	4.0	4.2	2.9	33.6	59.3
Hörby	78.8	5.3	8,504	28.8	26.7	12.4	7.0	6.3	2.4	3.1	8.0	5.1	34.4	52.5
Höör	80.4	5.3	8,657	30.7	28.2	8.6	7.2	5.7	3.8	5.2	7.7	3.0	39.7	49.7
Landskrona	80.0	14.2	23,056	40.8	24.2	3.0	12.2	2.7	3.9	2.9	8.2	2.1	47.5	42.1
Svalöv	80.4	4.6	7,487	35.7	22.9	13.8	5.9	4.3	3.0	3.0	9.7	1.7	41.7	46.9
Total	80.1	2.9	161,931	34.9	28.7	5.7	8.5	4.9	3.3	3.7	7.1	3.2	42.0	47.7
Source: val.se

=== Stockholm ===
==== Stockholm (city) ====
Location	Turnout	Share	Votes	S	M	C	FP	KD	V	MP	SD	Other	Left	Right
Stockholm NE	85.9	19.1	92,315	11.3	50.7	6.9	12.0	5.7	3.6	6.7	1.0	2.0	21.7	75.4
Stockholm NW	75.4	14.0	67,781	33.7	28.9	3.6	8.7	5.7	8.0	7.1	2.1	2.2	48.8	46.9
Stockholm S	85.4	20.4	98,205	22.1	30.0	6.5	9.7	3.9	9.7	13.2	1.3	3.5	45.0	50.2
Stockholm SE	79.4	15.3	73,888	32.5	25.1	4.1	8.1	4.8	9.8	10.1	2.4	3.2	52.4	42.0
Stockholm SW	80.6	14.6	70,296	28.8	28.5	4.6	8.9	4.6	9.2	10.3	2.2	3.0	48.3	46.6
Stockholm W	86.3	16.6	79,970	15.7	43.5	7.1	12.2	5.7	4.6	7.9	1.2	2.1	28.2	68.5
Total	82.4	8.7	482,455	23.2	35.1	5.7	10.1	5.0	7.4	9.3	1.6	2.7	39.9	55.8
Source: val.se

==== Stockholm County ====
Location	Turnout	Share	Votes	S	M	C	FP	KD	V	MP	SD	Other	Left	Right
Botkyrka	76.1	5.7	37,661	38.4	27.0	3.3	7.7	6.7	7.2	5.4	2.2	2.1	51.0	44.7
Danderyd	88.5	3.0	19,657	7.8	59.7	6.3	10.6	9.4	1.2	3.0	0.7	1.2	12.0	86.1
Ekerö	88.6	2.3	14,828	17.1	44.7	7.0	10.3	7.4	3.3	6.6	1.4	2.2	27.0	69.4
Haninge	80.5	6.1	40,247	33.3	32.6	3.9	7.9	5.9	5.9	5.5	2.3	2.8	44.6	50.3
Huddinge	83.7	7.4	48,461	29.1	35.2	4.2	9.2	6.2	5.7	5.4	2.7	2.3	40.3	54.7
Järfälla	83.7	5.7	37,156	30.1	34.1	4.1	9.5	6.8	5.6	5.5	2.2	2.1	41.2	54.4
Lidingö	87.4	4.1	27,193	11.5	52.9	6.4	11.9	8.1	2.2	4.3	1.4	1.2	18.0	79.3
Nacka	85.9	7.5	49,022	19.9	43.8	5.7	10.2	6.3	4.3	6.6	1.3	1.9	30.8	66.0
Norrtälje	80.8	5.0	33,114	31.5	32.0	9.5	6.7	6.3	4.8	4.9	2.1	2.2	41.1	54.6
Nykvarn	84.8	0.7	4,905	32.6	34.6	7.1	7.2	5.8	2.8	4.1	2.9	2.9	39.5	54.7
Nynäshamn	81.7	2.3	14,940	34.9	31.3	5.1	6.6	6.0	5.7	5.2	3.0	2.2	45.8	49.1
Salem	85.5	1.3	8,386	28.8	35.5	4.9	9.6	6.4	4.1	5.8	2.6	2.3	38.7	56.5
Sigtuna	79.8	3.1	20,505	32.9	34.7	5.3	7.6	6.3	4.1	4.5	2.5	2.1	41.5	53.9
Sollentuna	85.8	5.5	36,090	21.8	41.1	6.0	10.9	7.6	4.1	5.2	1.3	2.0	31.1	65.6
Solna	82.5	6.0	39,117	24.4	37.8	5.1	10.7	5.1	6.0	7.0	1.6	2.3	37.4	58.7
Sundbyberg	80.4	3.1	20,652	29.8	33.4	4.6	9.2	4.4	7.0	7.0	2.1	2.6	43.7	51.6
Södertälje	77.5	6.5	42,920	36.0	26.8	5.4	7.1	7.2	5.6	6.4	1.9	3.5	48.0	46.6
Tyresö	85.5	3.7	24,113	26.2	38.6	4.9	9.3	5.9	4.9	6.1	1.5	2.6	37.1	58.8
Täby	87.9	5.9	38,843	13.8	53.8	5.2	11.2	7.5	2.1	3.8	1.1	1.5	19.7	77.7
Upplands-Bro	81.8	1.8	12,105	32.4	31.9	4.4	7.7	8.4	5.7	5.0	2.6	1.9	43.1	52.3
Upplands Väsby	80.2	3.2	21,214	30.6	34.5	4.0	9.0	6.3	5.8	5.2	2.5	2.1	41.6	53.8
Vallentuna	85.9	2.5	16,418	20.9	42.1	7.5	8.8	7.1	3.4	6.1	1.8	2.3	30.4	65.5
Vaxholm	88.2	1.0	6,472	17.2	46.6	6.9	8.9	7.8	2.9	6.9	1.1	1.7	27.0	70.1
Värmdö	85.8	3.1	20,625	22.4	42.9	5.5	8.4	6.2	4.3	6.4	2.1	1.8	33.1	63.0
Österåker	85.5	3.4	22,580	22.8	42.3	5.6	9.3	7.3	3.6	5.6	1.8	1.7	31.9	64.9
Total	82.9	11.8	657,224	26.2	38.4	5.3	9.2	6.7	4.7	5.5	1.9	2.2	36.4	59.5
Source: val.se

=== Södermanland ===
Location	Turnout	Share	Votes	S	M	C	FP	KD	V	MP	SD	Other	Left	Right
Eskilstuna	79.6	33.5	53,595	44.1	21.6	6.0	6.9	5.8	5.4	5.4	2.8	2.1	54.8	40.3
Flen	81.9	6.2	9,911	46.5	20.2	8.7	4.9	5.6	5.4	4.3	2.7	1.7	56.1	39.5
Gnesta	82.6	3.7	5,990	34.5	26.1	11.3	5.5	5.6	4.9	7.3	2.5	2.3	46.6	48.6
Katrineholm	82.8	12.5	20,023	48.0	19.1	6.7	7.2	5.7	4.3	5.2	2.4	1.5	57.5	38.6
Nyköping	84.1	20.0	31,922	40.4	23.6	7.3	6.7	7.5	4.8	5.2	2.4	2.0	50.4	45.2
Oxelösund	81.9	4.3	6,944	50.7	18.5	3.4	5.7	4.6	8.1	4.7	2.3	1.9	63.6	32.3
Strängnäs	83.1	11.8	18,922	32.5	32.4	7.6	8.3	6.7	3.7	4.7	2.2	2.0	40.9	54.9
Trosa	85.5	4.2	6,739	31.0	35.2	6.3	7.9	7.0	3.4	4.9	1.9	2.4	39.3	56.3
Vingåker	83.3	3.6	5,704	51.0	18.4	7.8	4.1	6.1	4.0	4.5	2.8	1.3	59.4	36.4
Total	82.0	2.9	159,750	42.2	23.4	6.9	6.8	6.2	4.9	5.1	2.5	1.9	52.3	43.2
Source: val.se

=== Uppsala ===
Although the results for the Moderates and the Social Democrats both were rounded to 26.9%, the Moderates were the largest party in Uppsala Municipality by 15 votes or 26.89% versus 26.88%.

Location	Turnout	Share	Votes	S	M	C	FP	KD	V	MP	SD	Other	Left	Right
Enköping	81.2	11.7	23,020	34.2	29.1	12.5	5.2	5.9	3.8	4.4	2.2	2.7	42.3	52.7
Heby	79.6	4.1	8,023	36.7	18.9	17.0	5.0	7.1	5.9	3.1	3.8	2.4	45.8	48.1
Håbo	83.5	5.5	10,746	28.8	39.6	5.9	6.8	6.3	3.6	3.9	2.3	2.7	36.3	58.7
Knivsta	85.9	4.0	7,915	24.3	34.0	10.1	9.9	7.9	3.6	5.5	2.6	2.2	33.4	61.9
Tierp	79.8	6.1	12,006	45.8	14.7	14.3	5.6	5.5	5.5	3.6	3.1	2.0	54.8	40.0
Uppsala	84.0	59.2	116,207	26.9	26.9	8.6	11.3	7.0	6.5	7.8	2.0	3.0	41.2	53.8
Älvkarleby	82.5	2.8	5,558	54.4	14.6	4.6	5.0	3.7	7.6	3.5	3.8	2.9	65.4	27.9
Östhammar	79.4	6.6	12,914	39.4	23.5	13.1	6.0	5.5	4.4	3.7	2.3	2.0	47.5	48.1
Total	82.9	3.5	196,389	30.9	26.5	9.9	9.1	6.6	5.7	6.3	2.3	2.8	42.9	52.1
Source: val.se

=== Värmland ===
Location	Turnout	Share	Votes	S	M	C	FP	KD	V	MP	SD	Other	Left	Right
Arvika	79.1	9.3	15,608	41.6	18.5	11.2	5.5	5.4	6.8	4.9	3.9	2.1	53.3	40.7
Eda	75.3	2.5	4,228	45.3	16.1	15.8	3.5	6.1	4.8	2.1	3.3	3.0	52.2	41.5
Filipstad	77.4	3.9	6,551	56.5	14.0	5.9	4.2	3.5	8.9	2.3	3.1	1.6	67.7	27.5
Forshaga	83.2	4.2	7,033	51.2	16.3	7.6	5.0	5.3	5.7	3.1	3.6	2.1	59.9	34.3
Grums	78.7	3.3	5,591	52.0	16.3	9.5	3.3	5.4	6.4	2.3	2.7	2.1	60.7	34.5
Hagfors	79.9	4.9	8,321	55.8	11.7	8.3	3.1	3.1	11.1	1.8	3.7	1.5	68.7	26.2
Hammarö	85.9	5.4	9,078	41.9	25.0	5.6	7.0	6.6	5.7	4.0	2.3	1.9	51.6	44.2
Karlstad	83.6	31.8	53,554	36.8	25.2	7.5	7.7	6.5	6.0	5.5	2.3	2.5	48.3	46.9
Kil	82.4	4.3	7,167	41.7	21.0	11.0	6.0	6.5	5.2	3.4	3.3	1.9	50.4	44.5
Kristinehamn	81.9	9.0	15,131	43.6	20.6	8.6	6.4	5.5	7.3	3.6	2.5	1.9	54.5	41.1
Munkfors	80.7	1.5	2,492	55.8	9.5	9.7	5.5	2.7	9.1	2.4	3.2	2.0	67.3	27.4
Storfors	81.8	1.6	2,761	52.3	15.5	8.4	3.6	4.5	8.6	2.2	2.8	2.0	63.1	32.1
Sunne	81.3	5.0	8,355	34.2	23.7	19.9	5.2	5.7	3.9	3.2	2.5	1.7	41.4	54.4
Säffle	79.9	5.8	9,766	36.7	20.6	17.1	5.2	7.0	4.2	2.5	3.9	2.8	43.4	49.9
Torsby	78.5	4.7	7,842	44.7	21.4	11.7	3.2	3.9	8.3	2.4	2.9	1.4	55.5	40.2
Årjäng	73.7	2.9	4,948	31.9	19.3	18.7	8.2	10.0	4.6	2.3	2.9	2.0	38.9	56.2
Total	81.3	3.0	168,426	42.0	20.9	10.0	6.0	5.8	6.4	3.9	2.9	2.2	52.3	42.7
Source: val.se

=== Västerbotten ===
Location	Turnout	Share	Votes	S	M	C	FP	KD	V	MP	SD	Other	Left	Right
Bjurholm	79.5	1.0	1,570	35.7	19.2	20.0	9.7	8.4	3.2	2.2	0.3	1.3	41.1	57.3
Dorotea	76.9	1.1	1,854	54.6	8.7	12.5	8.6	3.2	9.0	1.0	1.0	1.3	64.6	33.1
Lycksele	79.7	4.8	7,794	50.1	12.2	8.7	6.1	9.3	7.3	2.7	1.7	1.9	60.1	36.3
Malå	81.2	1.3	2,130	54.2	10.4	8.9	6.3	5.3	11.0	1.4	0.7	1.8	66.6	30.9
Nordmaling	81.5	2.9	4,669	46.2	11.8	15.8	8.3	6.5	6.1	2.5	1.5	1.4	54.7	42.3
Norsjö	78.9	1.7	2,742	49.4	7.3	15.4	4.6	9.1	9.6	1.6	1.0	2.0	60.6	36.3
Robertsfors	82.5	2.7	4,412	39.6	9.9	28.1	3.9	6.4	6.2	3.1	0.8	2.1	48.9	48.3
Skellefteå	83.3	28.3	45,981	50.3	11.0	10.1	6.0	6.3	8.9	4.3	1.4	1.8	63.5	33.4
Sorsele	75.6	1.0	1,682	41.3	12.7	17.9	4.2	9.3	8.1	2.9	1.4	2.3	52.3	44.1
Storuman	76.7	2.4	3,885	40.9	15.6	12.4	6.3	9.9	8.4	2.7	1.2	2.7	52.0	44.2
Umeå	84.8	43.5	70,674	38.6	16.5	10.5	6.9	5.6	8.6	9.1	0.9	3.3	56.2	39.5
Vilhelmina	80.1	2.8	4,502	47.0	8.9	12.9	6.0	10.0	8.9	2.3	1.4	2.5	58.3	37.8
Vindeln	78.2	2.1	3,480	39.2	16.4	19.4	5.9	8.5	4.7	2.4	1.2	2.3	46.3	50.2
Vännäs	80.4	3.1	5,044	42.5	12.5	18.2	4.4	7.1	8.3	4.3	0.9	1.8	55.1	42.2
Åsele	80.7	1.3	2,071	50.6	9.9	16.3	4.8	6.5	7.0	1.1	1.6	2.3	58.6	37.5
Total	82.9	2.9	162,490	43.9	13.7	11.8	6.4	6.5	8.4	5.9	1.1	2.2	58.1	38.3
Source: val.se

=== Västernorrland ===
Location	Turnout	Share	Votes	S	M	C	FP	KD	V	MP	SD	Other	Left	Right
Härnösand	81.9	10.4	15,905	39.4	19.1	11.5	5.0	4.9	7.0	5.7	2.2	5.2	52.2	40.5
Kramfors	80.8	8.3	12,717	50.2	12.8	14.4	3.0	4.1	9.3	3.0	1.4	1.9	62.5	34.3
Sollefteå	79.4	8.5	13,052	51.1	13.0	10.5	4.0	4.6	9.1	3.6	2.2	1.9	63.8	32.1
Sundsvall	81.8	38.6	59,172	42.1	21.0	8.2	7.3	5.1	6.6	4.5	2.8	2.4	53.2	41.6
Timrå	80.9	7.0	10,811	53.4	12.6	8.7	4.6	4.4	7.7	2.8	3.5	2.3	63.9	30.3
Ånge	78.5	4.2	6,455	48.6	14.0	12.1	3.4	5.0	8.5	2.6	3.3	2.5	59.7	34.5
Örnsköldsvik	82.8	23.0	35,305	49.2	14.9	13.0	4.4	8.4	4.0	2.8	1.0	2.3	56.1	40.7
Total	81.5	2.8	153,417	46.0	17.2	10.6	5.4	5.7	6.7	3.8	2.2	2.6	56.5	38.8
Source: val.se

=== Västmanland ===
Location	Turnout	Share	Votes	S	M	C	FP	KD	V	MP	SD	Other	Left	Right
Arboga	81.0	5.5	8,207	42.1	21.1	8.8	6.6	5.2	6.4	3.9	2.4	3.5	52.3	41.7
Fagersta	78.3	4.9	7,237	49.9	17.8	4.4	5.1	4.6	9.4	3.0	2.3	3.3	62.4	32.0
Hallstahammar	79.3	5.8	8,588	49.1	16.0	5.3	5.9	7.2	7.5	3.7	2.8	2.4	60.3	34.5
Kungsör	81.1	3.3	4,963	38.8	23.4	10.9	6.1	5.6	5.8	3.7	3.2	2.6	48.2	46.0
Köping	78.9	9.8	14,556	45.1	19.9	8.6	5.6	5.0	6.6	3.3	3.4	2.4	55.1	39.1
Norberg	79.6	2.4	3,507	44.5	16.3	6.6	4.5	3.3	12.6	4.2	3.1	4.8	61.3	30.8
Sala	81.0	8.8	13,100	35.5	23.0	14.3	6.3	6.5	5.7	3.5	2.7	2.5	44.7	50.1
Skinnskatteberg	79.3	1.9	2,773	48.6	14.4	9.2	5.7	3.8	9.2	3.4	3.0	2.8	61.2	33.1
Surahammar	78.3	3.8	5,664	54.0	14.4	4.8	5.9	4.2	8.4	3.1	2.5	2.8	65.4	29.3
Västerås	81.7	53.7	79,704	35.9	26.7	5.3	10.1	6.0	5.3	4.9	2.2	3.5	46.1	48.2
Total	80.8	2.7	148,299	39.8	23.3	6.9	8.1	5.7	6.2	4.3	2.5	3.2	50.3	44.0
Source: val.se

=== Västra Götaland ===
==== Gothenburg ====
Location	Turnout	Share	Votes	S	M	C	FP	KD	V	MP	SD	Other	Left	Right
Gothenburg	79.5	100.0	292,726	28.9	26.9	4.5	10.2	6.7	8.7	8.4	2.5	3.1	46.0	48.3
Total	79.5	5.3	292,726	28.9	26.9	4.5	10.2	6.7	8.7	8.4	2.5	3.1	46.0	48.3
Source: val.se

==== Västra Götaland E ====
Location	Turnout	Share	Votes	S	M	C	FP	KD	V	MP	SD	Other	Left	Right
Essunga	82.6	2.2	3,570	29.8	27.4	18.2	4.6	7.5	4.3	3.0	2.9	2.2	37.2	57.8
Falköping	82.7	12.3	19,561	36.1	22.4	12.6	4.5	9.6	4.8	3.6	4.2	2.2	44.5	49.1
Grästorp	83.0	2.3	3,649	32.6	29.5	16.4	4.5	6.4	3.6	2.4	2.3	2.4	38.6	56.8
Gullspång	82.4	2.2	3,440	43.1	17.8	11.2	4.7	7.0	5.3	3.0	3.7	4.3	51.4	40.6
Götene	83.8	5.0	8,013	38.6	21.0	10.9	5.5	10.8	4.7	3.9	2.6	2.0	47.2	48.3
Hjo	83.1	3.5	5,621	35.5	25.7	9.1	5.9	10.1	4.4	4.4	3.0	2.0	44.3	50.8
Karlsborg	83.9	2.8	4,504	39.4	22.1	13.5	6.1	7.4	3.8	2.8	2.6	2.3	46.0	49.1
Lidköping	83.9	15.0	23,901	39.5	22.4	8.8	5.4	8.8	6.4	4.3	2.8	1.8	50.1	45.3
Mariestad	81.4	9.2	14,736	42.1	23.6	6.8	4.9	7.7	6.1	3.8	3.0	2.0	52.0	43.0
Skara	82.2	7.2	11,514	38.4	25.5	9.1	6.1	6.7	4.8	4.1	3.0	2.0	47.4	47.5
Skövde	82.2	19.5	31,006	37.5	25.4	8.8	6.7	7.4	5.0	4.0	3.0	2.1	46.5	48.3
Tibro	81.9	4.1	6,563	40.3	19.7	9.8	7.0	10.3	4.6	2.9	3.3	2.3	47.7	46.7
Tidaholm	83.7	5.0	7,899	48.7	17.3	8.6	4.2	7.2	5.6	3.0	3.3	2.0	57.3	37.4
Töreboda	78.4	3.4	5,498	39.9	21.2	14.0	4.0	6.9	5.2	3.1	3.0	2.7	48.1	46.2
Vara	81.3	6.2	9,913	32.1	28.6	16.0	4.9	7.8	4.1	2.3	2.2	1.9	38.6	57.2
Total	82.5	2.9	159,388	38.4	23.5	10.5	5.5	8.2	5.1	3.7	3.1	2.1	47.2	47.6
Source: val.se

==== Västra Götaland N ====
Location	Turnout	Share	Votes	S	M	C	FP	KD	V	MP	SD	Other	Left	Right
Ale	81.7	9.5	15,405	40.0	21.2	7.0	7.2	7.1	7.2	4.2	3.9	2.2	51.4	42.5
Alingsås	84.9	14.2	23,144	31.5	22.7	8.1	9.7	10.4	6.4	6.7	2.4	2.2	44.6	50.9
Bengtsfors	78.9	3.8	6,096	42.8	16.6	14.4	4.9	6.9	5.5	4.1	2.1	2.8	52.4	42.7
Dals-Ed	78.5	1.7	2,747	33.9	19.8	17.1	4.7	12.0	3.1	2.8	1.9	4.7	39.8	53.7
Färgelanda	80.3	2.5	4,081	38.1	17.5	18.7	6.3	5.6	3.7	2.1	4.2	3.6	44.0	48.2
Herrljunga	84.2	3.6	5,849	31.0	21.3	15.5	6.9	10.6	4.9	3.2	3.6	3.0	39.2	54.3
Lerum	87.0	14.0	22,753	27.5	30.0	6.3	10.2	8.8	5.6	6.4	2.5	2.8	39.4	55.3
Lilla Edet	79.6	4.5	7,389	42.5	17.7	9.1	5.4	5.5	7.9	3.8	5.2	3.0	54.2	37.7
Mellerud	78.9	3.5	5,657	34.2	20.5	15.9	5.3	9.4	5.0	3.1	4.3	2.2	42.3	51.2
Trollhättan	82.1	19.8	32,139	49.6	18.8	5.6	6.8	5.5	5.4	4.3	2.0	2.1	59.2	36.7
Vårgårda	84.5	4.1	6,663	29.5	18.4	13.6	7.6	16.6	4.2	4.7	3.2	2.2	38.4	56.2
Vänersborg	82.1	14.1	22,917	42.0	19.4	8.5	6.7	7.5	5.9	4.8	2.6	2.5	52.7	42.1
Åmål	79.3	4.7	7,592	44.2	18.4	11.1	5.1	6.4	5.8	4.2	2.4	2.5	54.1	41.0
Total	82.7	2.9	162,432	38.5	21.2	8.9	7.5	8.1	5.8	4.8	2.8	2.5	49.1	45.6
Source: val.se

==== Västra Götaland S ====
Location	Turnout	Share	Votes	S	M	C	FP	KD	V	MP	SD	Other	Left	Right
Bollebygd	86.2	4.6	5,171	32.4	27.1	9.4	6.6	8.5	5.6	3.5	3.8	3.2	41.5	51.6
Borås	81.7	53.2	60,258	36.4	25.4	5.8	7.2	7.9	6.1	4.2	3.2	3.9	46.7	46.2
Mark	82.8	18.1	20,492	38.3	20.4	11.8	5.3	7.8	6.4	4.0	2.9	3.0	48.7	45.4
Svenljunga	79.2	5.4	6,097	34.2	24.0	16.3	6.2	7.7	2.6	2.2	2.9	4.0	38.9	54.2
Tranemo	83.0	6.4	7,238	36.1	21.2	17.6	5.8	6.5	3.5	3.1	3.9	2.4	42.7	51.0
Ulricehamn	83.2	12.4	14,015	30.7	24.0	14.7	5.7	9.8	4.0	4.2	2.9	4.0	38.8	54.2
Total	82.2	2.0	113,271	35.7	24.1	9.5	6.5	8.0	5.5	4.0	3.2	3.6	45.2	48.1
Source: val.se

==== Västra Götaland W ====
Location	Turnout	Share	Votes	S	M	C	FP	KD	V	MP	SD	Other	Left	Right
Härryda	85.8	9.3	19,272	29.2	29.6	6.9	10.7	7.4	5.4	5.5	2.7	2.6	40.1	54.6
Kungälv	86.1	12.0	24,832	33.0	26.2	7.9	8.8	8.7	5.1	4.5	3.5	2.4	42.6	51.6
Lysekil	81.7	4.5	9,269	42.9	20.7	4.8	10.2	6.0	5.5	4.7	2.5	2.7	53.0	41.7
Munkedal	78.6	2.9	6,046	38.3	20.1	14.2	5.9	8.0	4.7	3.3	3.3	2.2	46.3	48.1
Mölndal	84.2	17.4	36,078	29.9	27.8	5.6	11.6	7.6	6.1	5.5	3.3	2.5	41.6	52.6
Orust	83.1	4.7	9,773	31.0	25.8	11.7	8.0	8.0	5.1	4.8	2.6	3.1	40.8	53.4
Partille	84.4	9.7	20,250	30.4	28.3	4.6	10.7	8.4	6.1	5.2	2.8	3.4	41.8	52.0
Sotenäs	82.1	2.9	6,087	31.7	30.2	6.4	10.3	9.7	3.7	3.3	2.2	2.7	38.7	56.5
Stenungsund	83.7	6.8	14,056	31.4	27.8	7.4	9.0	7.3	5.1	5.0	2.6	4.3	41.5	51.6
Strömstad	75.8	2.9	6,048	34.2	21.9	13.8	9.8	6.3	4.9	5.2	1.8	2.2	44.4	51.7
Tanum	80.1	3.6	7,423	25.2	26.8	19.0	8.7	7.1	3.5	4.7	2.2	2.7	33.5	61.7
Tjörn	85.2	4.7	9,734	24.8	29.5	6.3	11.1	15.9	4.0	4.2	2.0	2.2	33.0	62.8
Uddevalla	81.9	14.9	30,853	38.9	23.1	6.1	7.5	7.9	5.2	4.7	3.6	3.1	48.7	44.6
Öckerö	88.1	3.8	7,997	24.0	28.4	3.4	9.3	21.7	4.1	4.5	2.3	2.5	32.6	62.7
Total	83.6	3.7	207,718	32.1	26.5	7.3	9.6	8.7	5.2	4.9	2.9	2.8	42.2	52.1
Source: val.se

=== Örebro ===
Location	Turnout	Share	Votes	S	M	C	FP	KD	V	MP	SD	Other	Left	Right
Askersund	82.7	4.3	7,371	43.9	18.6	10.9	5.2	7.4	5.4	3.5	3.7	1.3	52.9	42.1
Degerfors	82.3	3.7	6,302	57.6	9.8	5.4	3.2	5.2	11.2	2.7	2.9	2.0	71.5	23.6
Hallsberg	84.0	5.6	9,568	49.1	14.7	8.7	4.9	6.6	5.9	3.5	4.6	1.9	58.5	35.0
Hällefors	79.2	2.7	4,540	57.5	12.6	7.6	2.7	3.0	8.6	2.7	3.5	1.9	68.8	25.8
Karlskoga	81.5	11.0	18,917	49.4	19.8	4.2	4.7	5.3	6.4	3.2	3.0	4.0	58.9	34.1
Kumla	84.6	7.0	12,011	47.3	16.5	7.4	6.1	8.9	4.7	2.9	4.4	1.8	54.9	38.9
Laxå	80.9	2.2	3,799	53.6	13.5	7.6	4.3	8.0	5.6	2.0	3.6	1.7	61.2	33.4
Lekeberg	83.6	2.6	4,519	34.8	18.9	17.2	4.8	10.0	4.1	3.6	4.7	2.0	42.5	50.9
Lindesberg	81.3	8.3	14,165	43.5	18.2	12.4	4.4	5.4	5.3	3.6	5.1	2.1	52.4	40.3
Ljusnarsberg	76.3	1.8	3,119	48.4	14.5	10.3	3.1	3.8	8.9	3.4	5.9	1.7	60.7	31.7
Nora	81.0	3.7	6,362	43.1	18.5	9.0	6.7	6.2	5.5	4.6	4.1	2.3	53.2	40.4
Örebro	83.7	47.1	80,630	38.0	21.0	6.3	8.7	8.1	6.0	6.0	3.5	2.4	50.0	44.1
Total	82.8	3.1	171,303	43.1	18.8	7.5	6.6	7.2	6.1	4.6	3.8	2.4	53.8	40.1
Source: val.se

=== Östergötland ===
Location	Turnout	Share	Votes	S	M	C	FP	KD	V	MP	SD	Other	Left	Right
Boxholm	84.2	1.3	3,340	50.5	13.5	11.2	2.9	8.0	5.5	3.0	2.5	2.9	59.0	35.6
Finspång	83.7	5.1	13,301	47.1	18.0	7.0	4.7	7.0	6.6	4.1	2.7	2.8	57.8	36.7
Kinda	84.2	2.4	6,279	38.0	20.8	16.2	3.7	8.4	4.2	4.0	2.5	2.3	46.1	49.1
Linköping	85.0	33.9	88,920	32.8	27.4	7.2	8.6	7.7	4.8	6.2	1.7	3.7	43.8	50.8
Mjölby	83.2	6.1	15,873	42.9	21.5	8.6	5.5	7.2	4.6	3.2	2.0	4.5	50.8	42.8
Motala	82.3	9.9	25,859	44.1	21.0	6.2	6.1	5.9	5.8	4.0	2.6	4.3	54.0	39.1
Norrköping	81.5	29.1	76,195	37.1	26.1	5.6	6.0	6.4	5.8	5.5	2.8	4.6	48.4	44.2
Söderköping	84.1	3.4	8,890	30.9	28.6	11.7	5.3	7.6	4.4	5.3	2.7	3.5	40.5	53.2
Vadstena	84.3	1.9	4,973	36.0	27.9	8.1	5.4	8.0	4.3	4.2	2.6	3.4	44.5	49.5
Valdemarsvik	82.5	2.0	5,214	40.2	22.9	14.7	4.2	6.6	4.0	2.7	2.5	2.3	46.8	48.4
Ydre	85.6	1.0	2,506	30.8	20.3	19.0	4.3	14.4	3.6	3.8	2.6	1.2	38.2	58.0
Åtvidaberg	84.0	2.8	7,411	46.4	19.8	10.3	4.2	7.0	4.6	3.1	2.2	2.4	54.2	41.3
Ödeshög	82.8	1.3	3,407	35.7	20.8	12.8	4.0	13.6	3.8	3.8	2.8	2.6	43.3	51.2
Total	83.4	4.7	262,168	37.4	24.8	7.6	6.5	7.2	5.2	5.1	2.3	3.9	47.7	46.1
Source: val.se
