= Masayuki Miyata =

Japanese artist

- Born: 1926; Akasaka, Tokyo
- Died: 1997 (aged 70–71)
- Known for: Papercutting
- Notable work: Gendai no Bijin Ga, Kiri-ega-shu, Red Fuji

Masayuki Miyata (宮田 雅之, Miyata Masayuki) (1926–1997) was a Japanese kiri-e (papercutting) artist. In 1995 he was selected as the year's official artist for the United Nations. He created illustrations for modern publications of Japanese classic literature, including Oku no Hosomichi, The Tale of Genji, and The Tale of the Bamboo Cutter. His most prominent work, Red Fuji, was produced and sold in 184 countries worldwide.
