= Hed =

Hed or HED may refer to:

== Arts and media ==
- Hed PE, a rapcore band
- A news headline (hed in jargon)
- 'A-Hed', a featured-story designation in The Wall Street Journal
- Hed, the setting of the fantasy novel The Riddle-Master of Hed

== Businesses ==
- Harley Ellis Devereaux, an architecture and engineering firm
- HED Cycling Products, a bicycle wheel manufacturer

== Places ==
- Hed socken, Sweden
- Herendeen Bay Airport, Alaska (IATA:HED)

== Science ==
- HED meteorite, a class of stony space debris
- Hypohidrotic ectodermal dysplasia, a genetic syndrome in humans

== See also ==
- Head (disambiguation)
- Hedd (disambiguation)
