= Gunnilbo socken =

- Socken
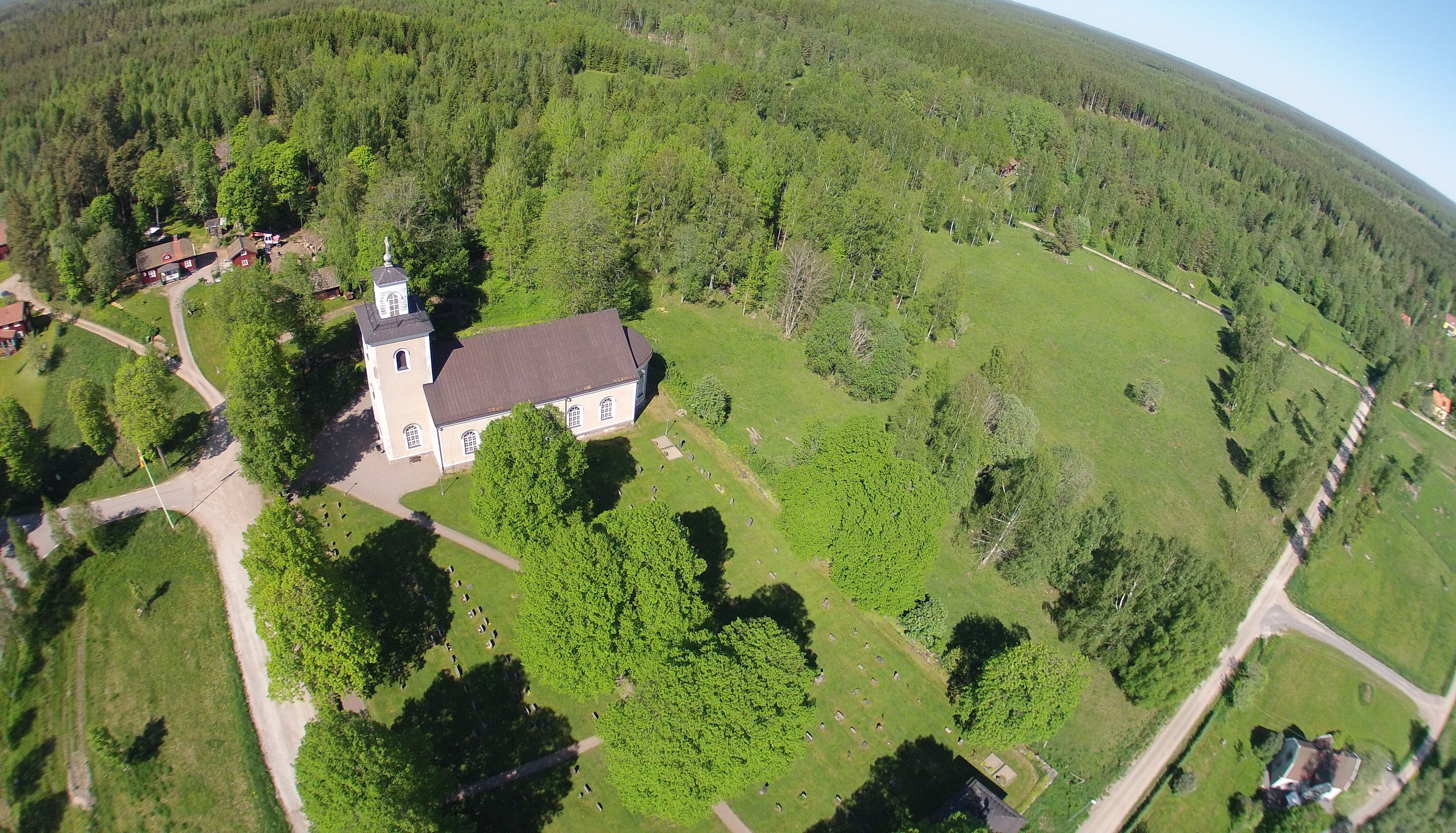
- Gunnilbo Church
- Interactive map of Gunnilbo socken
- Coordinates: 59°48′18″N 15°50′50″E
- Country: Sweden
- Province: Västmanland
- Hundred: Skinnskattebergs bergslag
- Municipality: Skinnskatteberg Municipality

Area
  - Total: 227.1 km^{2} (87.7 sq mi)
  - Land: 205.8 km^{2} (79.5 sq mi)

Population (2000)
  - Total: 432
  - Density: 2.10/km^{2} (5.44/sq mi)
- Time zone: UTC+1 (CET)
  - Summer (DST): UTC+2 (CEST)
- Sockenkod: 2283

Gunnilbo socken is a former socken of Skinnskattebergs bergslag in Västmanland, Sweden. The socken is situated on a tributary of Hedströmmen, in the wooded countryside north of the Lillsvan and Långsvan lakes. Most buildings are near the sites of the old Bockhammar and Färna ironworks (järnbruk). Near the Gunnilbo Church is the Karlslunds school, built in 1879.

== History ==
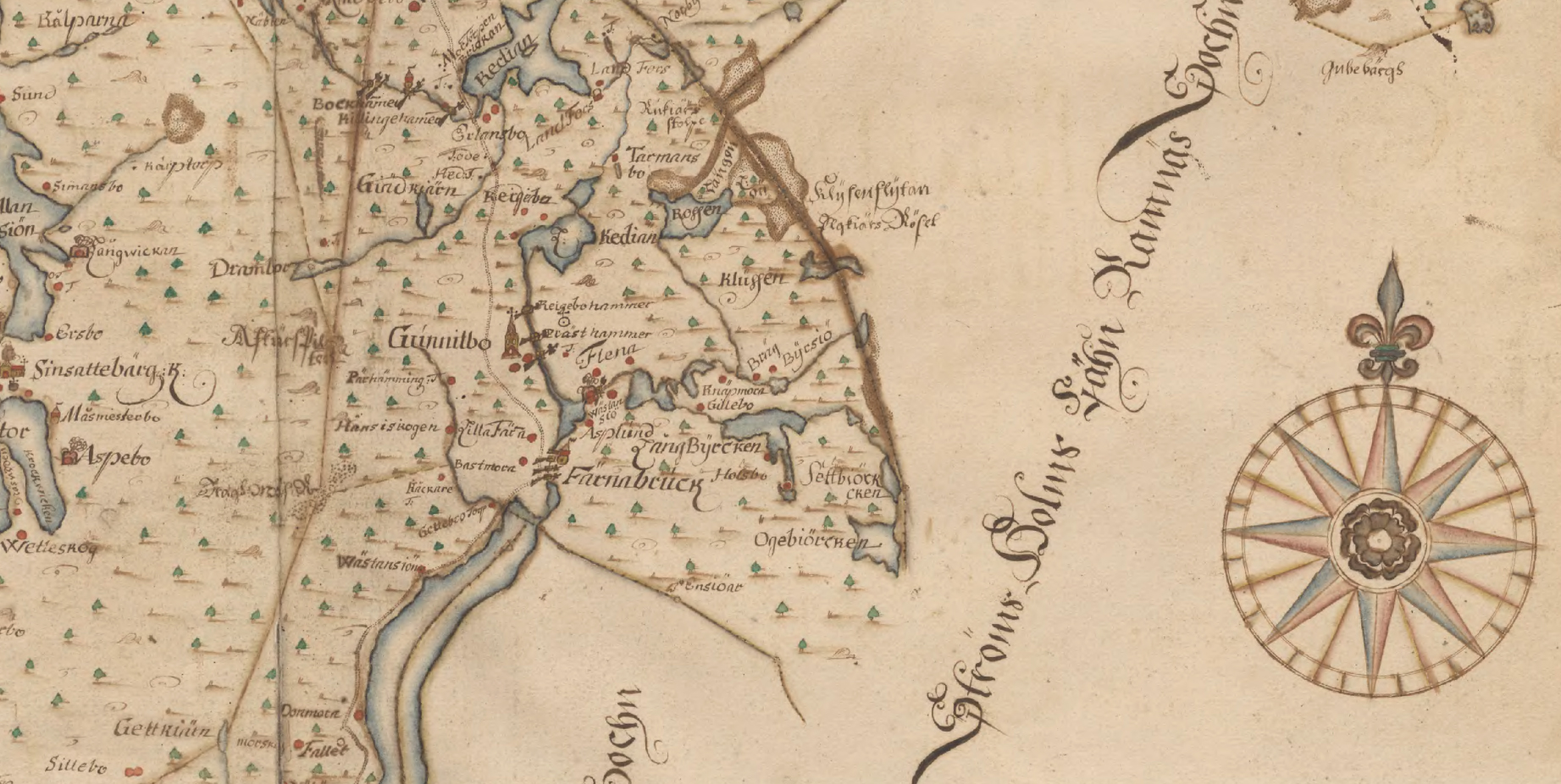
Gunnilbo parish 1688

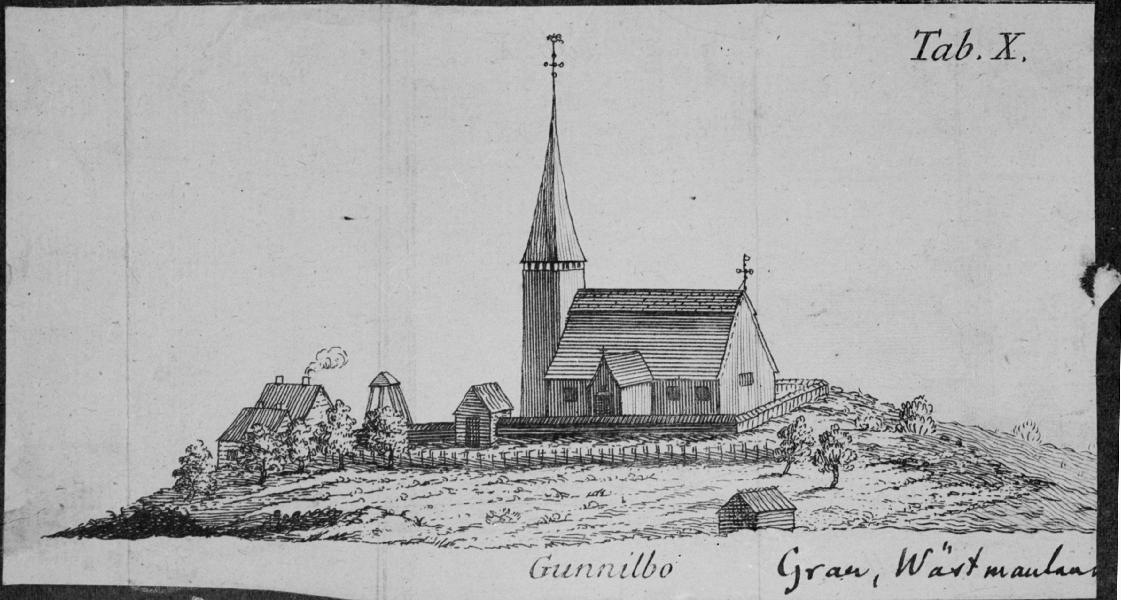
Gunnilbo Church, 1750s.

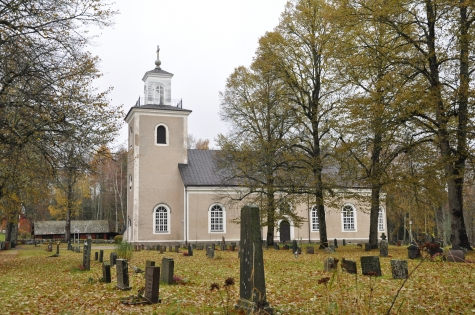
Gunnilbo Church 2012.

The first reference to Gunnilbo was in 1403 as Gunillabodhom, the prefix being the female name Gunhild and the suffix the plural of village. It represented the area where the church stands today.

In 1612 Gustavus Adolphus gave permission for the construction of a wooden chapel in the village of Gunnilbo. At that time the village belonged to Odensvi parish, which was called Odensvi fjärding. The chapel was described as a hall "where the Word of God could be preached." There was no vicar stationed there in the early years, but housing for the priest was allotted to Tarmansbo.

In 1638 Christina, Queen of Sweden declared Gunnilbo its own parish and it was broken off from Odensvi. The vicarage (Swedish: prästgården) was moved from Tarmansbo to Österbo. 1649 Gunnilbo and Heds parish were declared bergslager and became part of Skinnskattebergs bergslag.

Since the old church was considered too small, construction for a new parish church on the same site began in 1661. The chapel was either expanded or the new church was built on top of the demolished chapel. It was not finished until 1665. A decision was made in 1794 to build a new church would be built, but it was not completed until 1835.

With the municipal reform in 1862, it became the parish's responsibility for the ecclesiastical questions to Gunnilbo congregation and for the bourgeois ruling to Gunnilbo rural municipality. In 1895 it was one of the 22 Baptist churches in the Westmanland Association, as were Norberg, Hed and Skinnskatteberg. There were a total of 1,590 members in the Westmanland Association churches. The Gunnilbo Church minister was A.G. Anderson. The church was restored in 1966.

The country, or rural, municipality was incorporated in 1952 in Skinnskattebergs and in 1971 Gunnilbo came under the Skinnskattebergs municipality. The parish was in 2006 in Skinnskatteberg with Hed and Gunnilbo congregation.

The population of Gunnilbo socken was 2,023 in 1880 and 1,692 in 1907.

== Gunnilbo Church leaders ==
The following are lists of the churches vicars (Swedish: kyrkoherdar) and chaplains (Swedish: comministrar):

=== Vicars ===
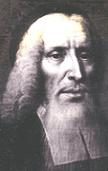
Andreas Georgii Troninus, 2nd vicar of Gunnilbo

#	Name	Lifetime	Vicarage	Notes
1	Petrus Henrici Barchæus	c. 1580–1654	1638–1654	grandson of vicar Henricus Andreæ Norlandus in Söderbärke (W)
2	Andreas Georgii Troninus	c. 1616–1655	1654–1655	married Brita Persdotter Silnæa, widowed (see #3)
3	Henricus Petri Barchæus	1622–1695	1655–1695	son of #1, married widow of #2
4	Johannes Laurentii Barchelius	1648–1698	1695–1698	married Susanna Barchæus (daughter of #3)
5	Laurentius Elfwius	1667–1700	1698–1700	son of Laurentius Petri Elfvius, vicar in Orsa (W)
6	Johannes Kumblin	1661–1725	1700–1725	married Susanna Barchæus (widow of #4)
7	Isac Arosell	1686–1730	1725–1730	married Margareta Barchelius (daughter of #4)
8	Olof Hellenius	1685–1731	1730–1731	married Margareta Barchelius (widow of #7)
9	Eric Kumblin	1702–1760	1732–1760	son of #6
10	Abraham Schultzberg	1719–1802	1760–1786	married Maria Kumblin (daughter of #9), later vicar of Skinnskatteberg (U)
11	Jacob Rhamnelius	1733–1788	1786–1788	
12	Johan Petter Arlberg	1749–1820	1789–1820	
13	Anders Norberg	1770–1840	1821–1840	
14	Daniel Löfwenius	1792–1843	1840–1843	

=== Chaplains ===
#	Name	Lifetime	Chaplainage	Notes
1	Petrus Gangius	1630–1692	1665–1677	became vicar of Haraker (U)
2	Johannes Laurentii Barchelius	1648–1698	1677–1695	vicar of this parish after
3	Johannes Kumblin	1661–1725	1695–1700	vicar of this parish after
4	Petrus Matthiae Weström	1677–1746	1700–1746	m. Anna Forselius, daughter of vicar of Haraker
5	Johan Arhusius	1711–1756	1747–1756	m. Anna Christ. Fellenius, daughter of vicar of Ljusnarsberg
6	Jonas Bergnell	1719–1770	1756–1790	m. Anna Christ. Fellenius, widow of #5
7	Jacob Rhamnelius	1733–1788	1771–1790	m. Maria Christ. Hellbom, daughter of vicar of Våla (U)
8	Olof Eckman	1750–1819	1785–1806	became vicar of Nås (U)
9	Lars Sundberg	1763–1808	1806–1808	m. Eva Brita Godenius, daughter of vicar of Gagnef (W)
10	Anders Norberg	1770–1840	1809–1812	vicar of this parish after
11	Anders Samuel Schultz	1778–1842	1812–1826	became vicar of Hed (U)
12	Johan Thorell	1785–1842	1827–1829	chaplain in Söderbärke (W) after
13	Pehr Olof Liedström	1800–????	1843–?????	

== Gunnilbo River ==
Beginning the 1600s or earlier dams were built along the Gunnilbo River (Swedish: Gunnilboån) to support mining enterprises. Even so, the river ecosystem was not hugely impacted. Starting in 1995 the river was affected by the change in regulations and decisions made by a remote landowner to maximize the potential output of a power station built downstream of the river. It was reported by the Swedish Society for Nature Conservation in 2002 that by changing water flow, the station had greater output but the riverbed sometimes went dry. As a result, there was a loss of fauna, or animal life, on the river, particularly the bottom-feeding dipper and brown trout. Any water life comes from upstream, inland waterways and is mostly water louse. The water is cloudy and has a low oxygen rate that makes it difficult to bottom feeding fish to survive. Local residents have campaigned for the return of responsible management of the waterway and the hydropower plant so that it can return to a healthy ecosystem.
