= Hed socken =

- Socken
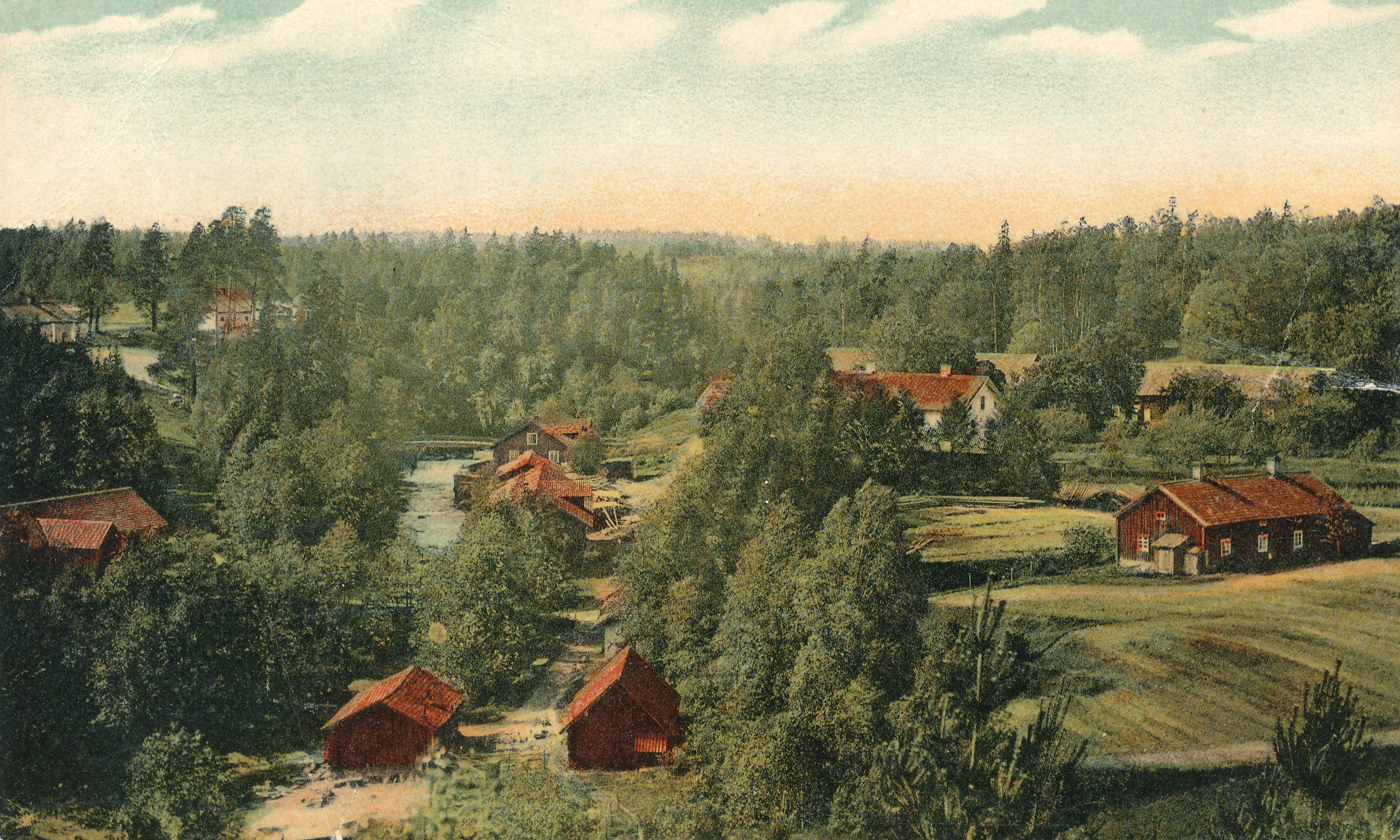
- Bernshammar around 1900
- Interactive map of Hed socken
- Coordinates: 59°40′50″N 15°45′55″E
- Country: Sweden
- Province: Västmanland
- Hundred: Skinnskattebergs bergslag

Area
  - Total: 110.26 km^{2} (42.57 sq mi)
  - Land: 99.96 km^{2} (38.59 sq mi)

Population (2000)
  - Total: 677

Hed socken in Västmanland, Sweden, was a part of the Skinnskattebergs bergslag and is since 1971, a part of Skinnskatteberg Municipality.

The socken's area is 110.26 square kilometres (42.57 sq mi), 99.96 square kilometres (38.59 sq mi) of which is land. Hed socken had 677 inhabitants in 2000. The mining village of Karmansbo, which includes the Hed Church, is situated in this socken.

== Administrative history ==
Hed socken was founded in 1593 from part of the Malma socken.

On municipal reform in 1862, responsibility for ecclesiastical matters passed to the Hed parish and for secular matters to Hed rural municipality. Hed rural municipality was incorporated in 1952 into Skinnskattebergs rural municipality, which itself became Skinnskatteberg Municipality in 1971. The parish was incorporated in 2006 into Skinnskatteberg with Hed and Gunnilbo parish.

Hed socken came under the tax bailiwick of the Skinnskattebergs mining district. Revenue from the district, collected through the allotment system, was used to billet soldiers from the Bergslagen (Berg) company of the Västmanland Regiment.

== Geography ==
Hed socken is located north-west of Köping and west of Hedströmmen. The lakes Långsvan and Lillsvan are to the east. The parish is hilly, with woods and bogs.

A railway line (now freight-only) runs from Godsstråket to Bergslagen through the western part of Hed socken. At the border with Skinnskattebergs, close to the railway line, are the remains of a camp (Krampenlägret) built to house Red Army internees during the World War II.

At Hedströmmen there are, counting from the north, Tomasbo, Västanhed, Karmansbo, Bernshammar and Jönsarbo. The Hed Church is located on a rise adjacent to county road 250. Close by is the village of Bubbarsbo, now mostly holiday homes on the banks of Lillsvan lake. To the north is Långsvan lake, on the western strand of which is Bysala village. Bysala is the old thing or assembly place for the Skinnskatteberg district. The county road 250 runs along the west side of Långsvan lake.

To the west the parish stretches to the county border with Örebro County, and to the Ramsberg parish in the Lindesberg Municipality. In the northwest it borders Skinnskattebergs parish and in the north Gunnilbo parish.

== History ==
There is evidence of seven settlements from the Stone Age. However between the Stone Age and the Middle Ages there is no evidence of settlement. During the Middle Ages the current settlement was established. There is also a deserted grave yard in the socken, as well as remnants of old foundries and trip hammers.

The population of Hed socken was 2,042 in 1880 and 2,053 in 1908.

== Identification ==
The name (in 1351, Heed) has the meaning of "heath", a dry, pine-covered land, referring to the Köping ridge that runs from Malma to Skinnskatteberg.
