= Lappland (nature reserve) =

Nature reserve in Västmanland, Sweden

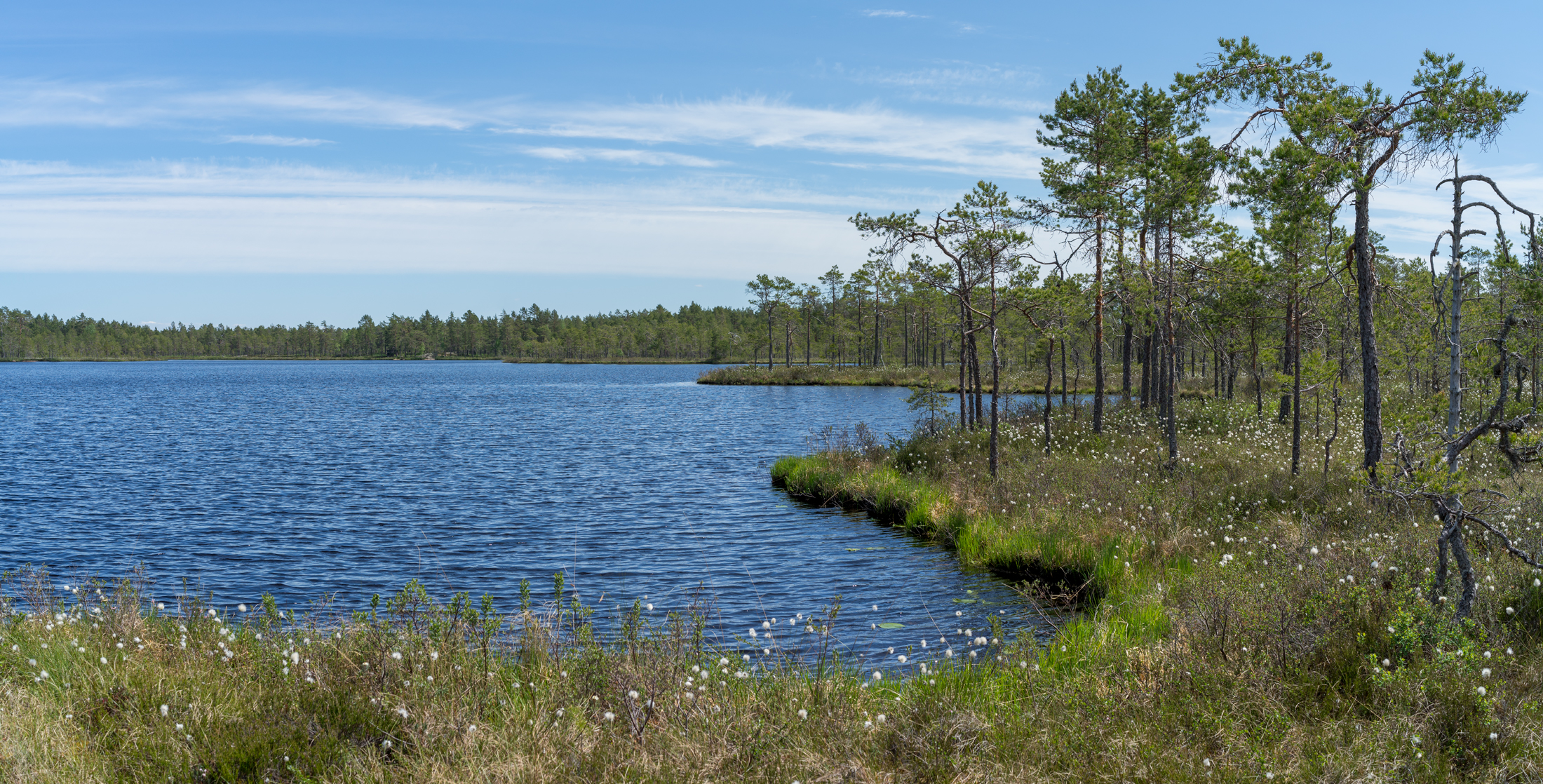
- The lake Håvtjärnen in Lappland

- Location within Västmanland Location within Sweden
- Location: Skinnskatteberg Municipality, Västmanland County, Sweden
- Coordinates: 59°47′39″N 15°45′52″E
- Area: 969 ha (2,390 acres)
- Established: 1996
- Governing body: Länsstyrelsen i Västmanlands län

Lappland is a nature reserve in Skinnskatteberg Municipality in Sweden. It is located around 5 km east of the small town Skinnskatteberg, and the Swedish county road 233 runs through it. The reserve consists mostly of wetlands and pine forest. Two smaller lakes, Håvtjärnen and Bladtjärnen, are located inside the reserve.

Between 2014 and 2017, controlled burning was conducted three times to preserve biodiversity by imitating natural forest fires. The last two were part of the European Union project Life Taiga.

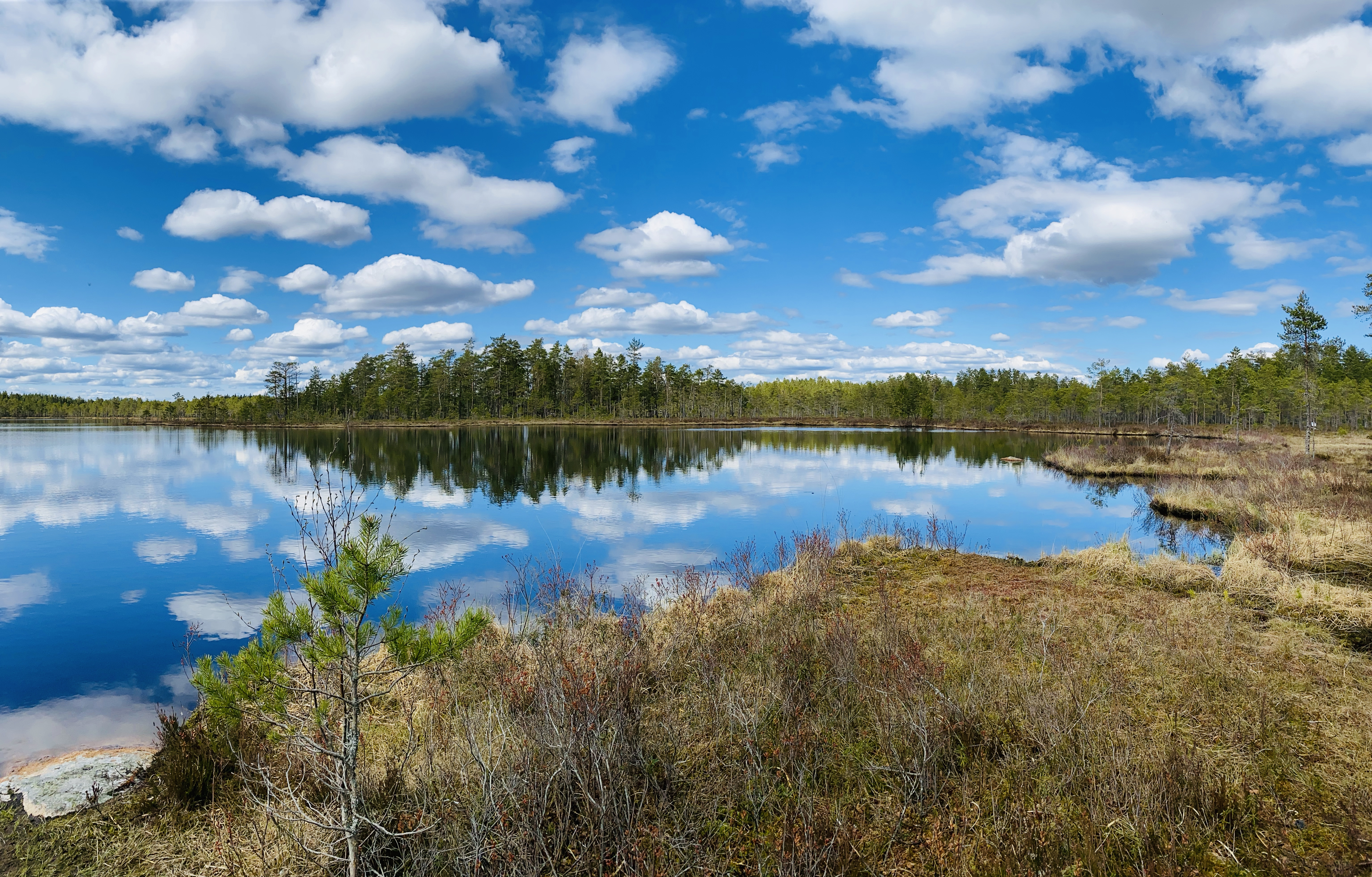
The lake Håvtjärnen

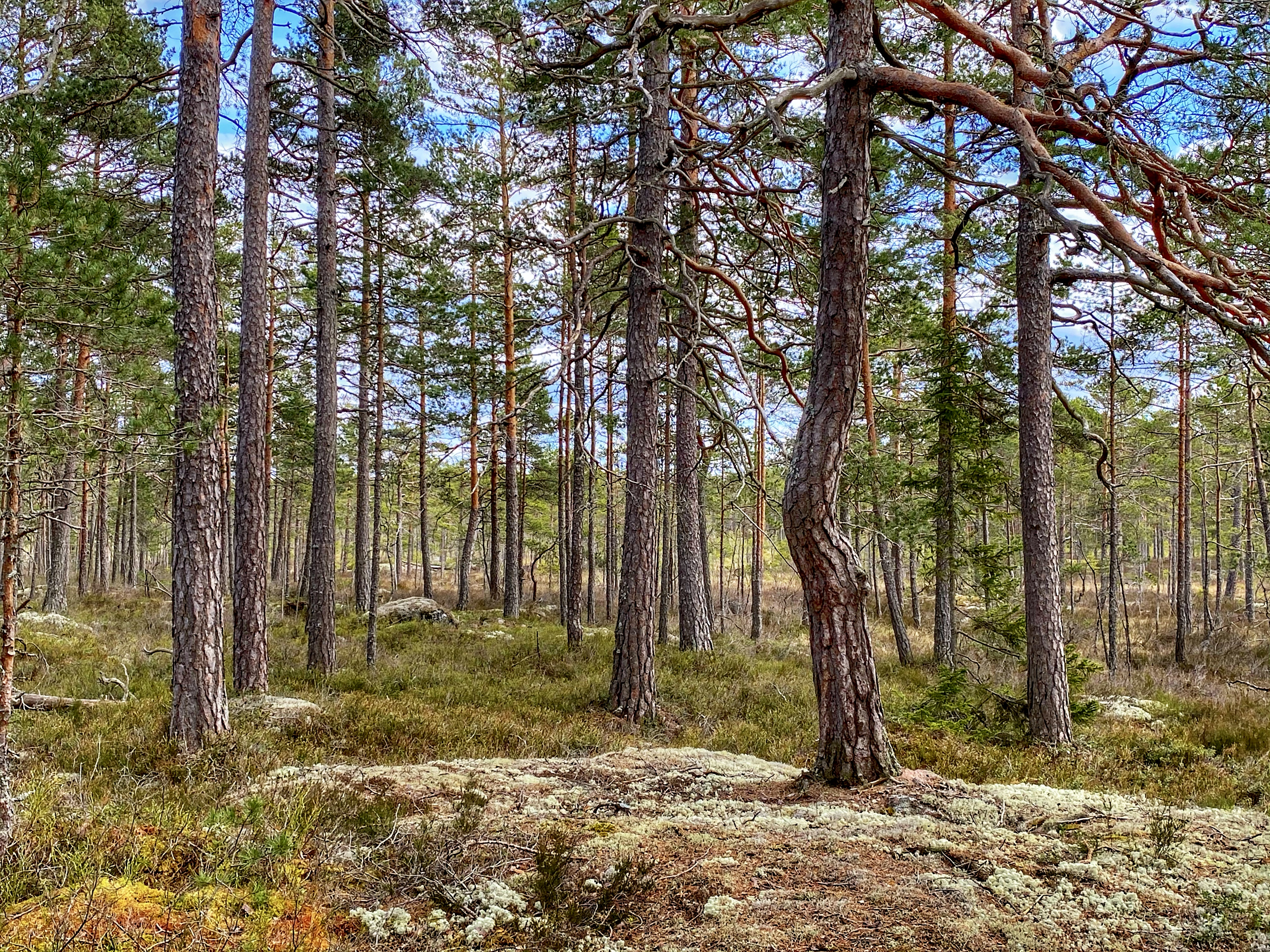
Pine forest

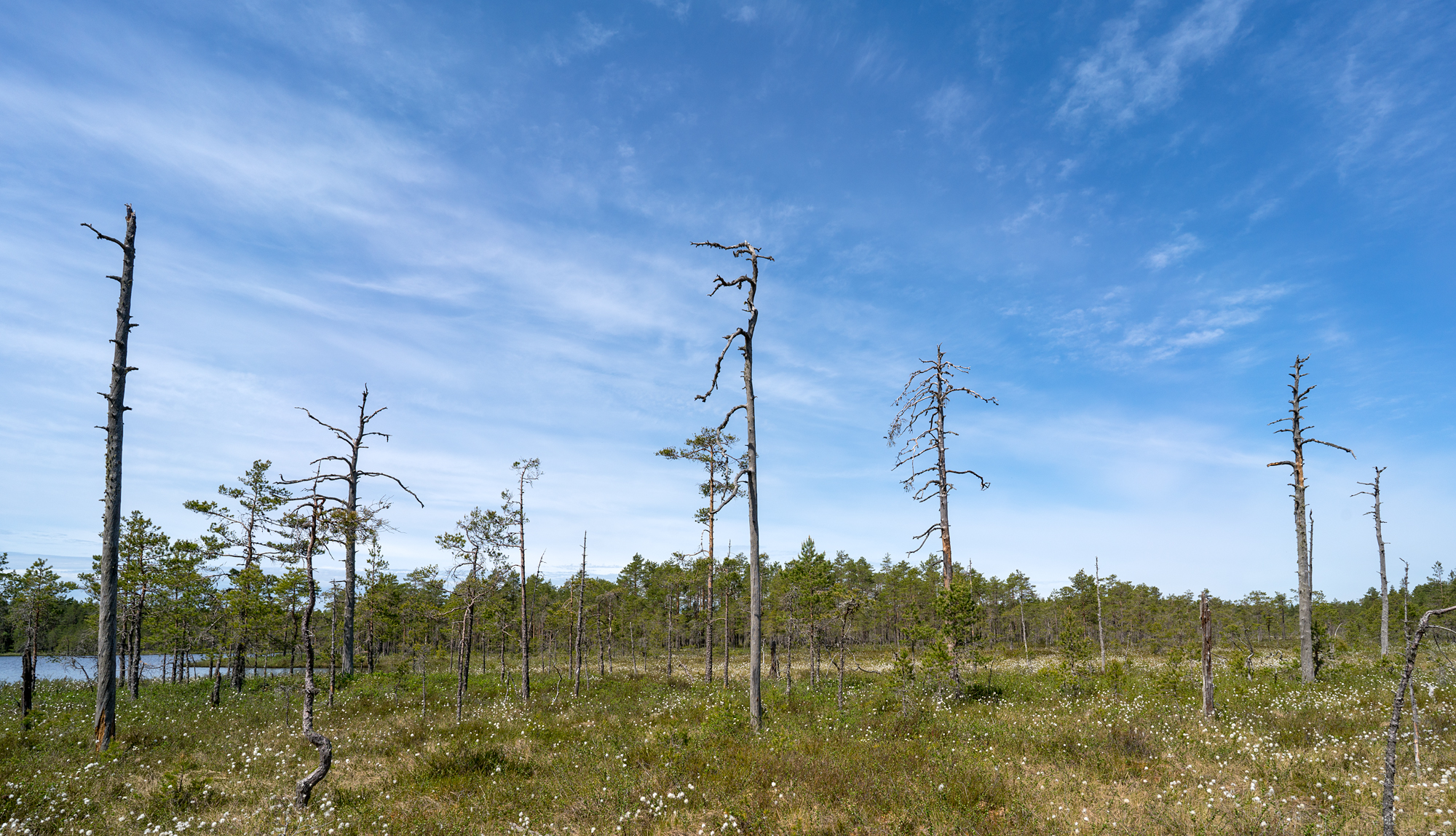
Wetland

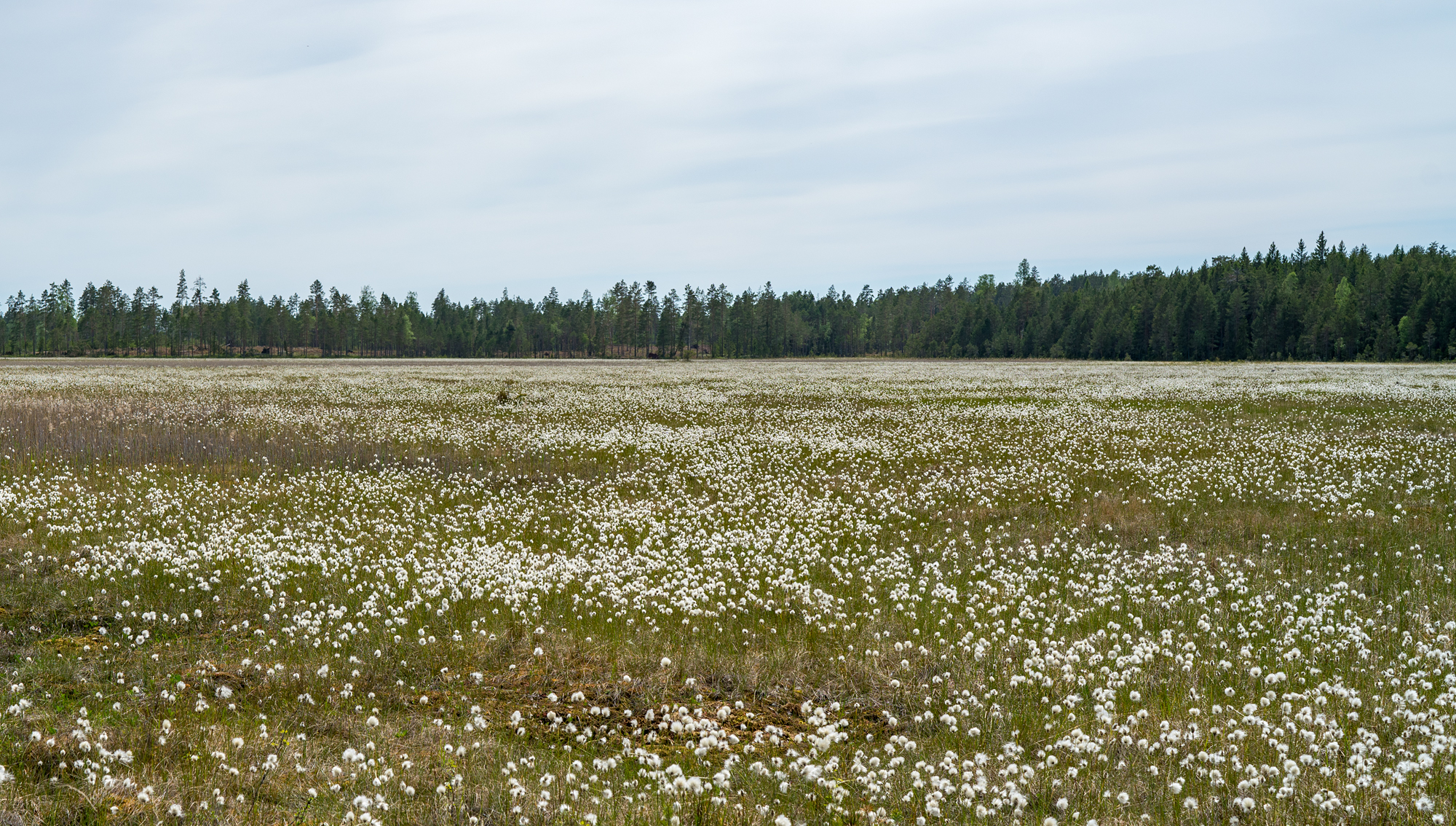
Wetland
