= Kärrbo =

- Location within Västmanland Location within Sweden
- Coordinates: 59°52′43″N 15°39′47″E
- Country: Sweden
- Province: Västmanland
- County: Västmanland County
- Municipality: Skinnskatteberg Municipality

Area
  - Total: 0.17 km^{2} (0.066 sq mi)

Population (31 December 2010)
  - Total: 52
  - Density: 300/km^{2} (780/sq mi)
- Time zone: UTC+1 (CET)
  - Summer (DST): UTC+2 (CEST)

Kärrbo is a village situated in Skinnskatteberg Municipality, Västmanland County, Sweden with 52 inhabitants in 2010.
