= Hed Church =

- Heds kyrka
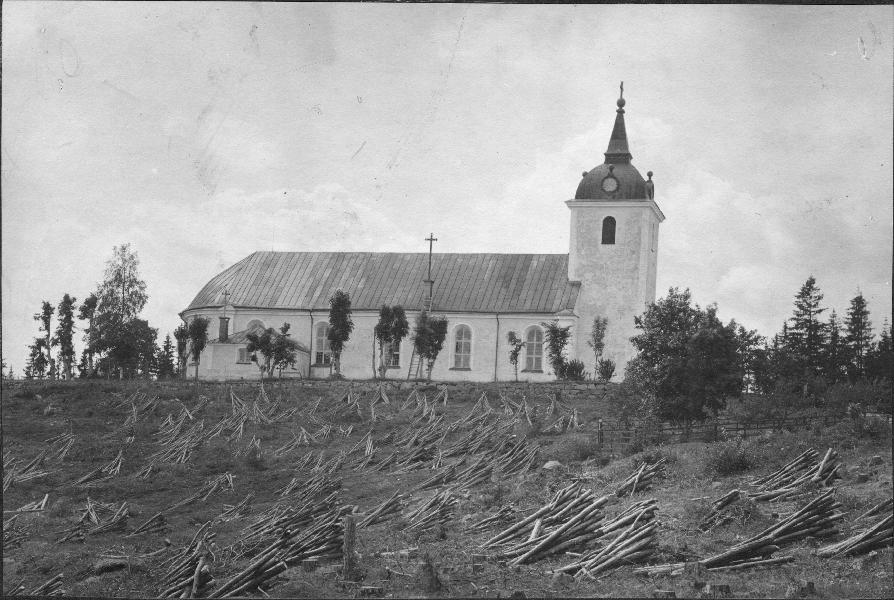
- Hed Church in 1904
- Hed Church
- 59°40′50″N 15°45′56″E
- Location: Hed socken
- Country: Sweden
- Denomination: Church of Sweden
- Website: Heds kyrka

History
- Founded: 1789

Administration
- Diocese: Diocese of Västerås
- Parish: Skinnskatteberg med Hed och Gunnilbo församling

Hed Church (Swedish: Heds kyrka) is a church in Hed socken, Sweden. It was inaugurated in 1789.
