= Skinnskatteberg Church =

- Skinnskattebergs kyrka
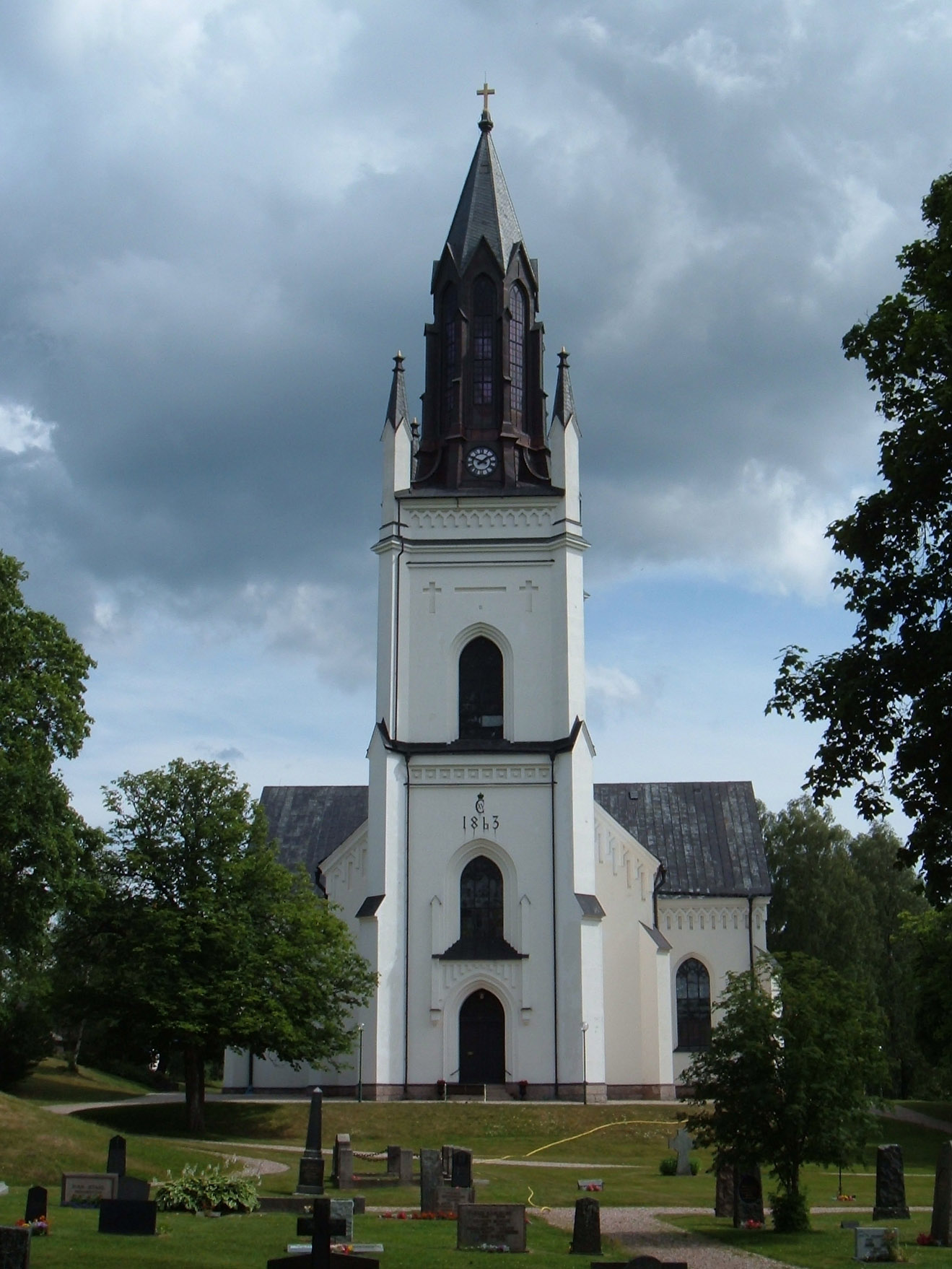
- Skinnskatteberg Church in 2006
- Skinnskatteberg Church
- 59°49′46″N 15°41′04″E
- Location: Skinnskatteberg
- Country: Sweden
- Denomination: Church of Sweden
- Website: Skinnskattebergs kyrka

History
- Founded: 1865

Administration
- Diocese: Diocese of Västerås
- Parish: Skinnskatteberg med Hed och Gunnilbo församling

Skinnskatteberg Church (Swedish: Skinnskattebergs kyrka) is a church in Skinnskatteberg, Sweden. It was built between 1858 and 1863, and was inaugurated in 1865.

The Baptismal font is made of brass and was produced in 1684. It was a gift from Lars Nilsson.

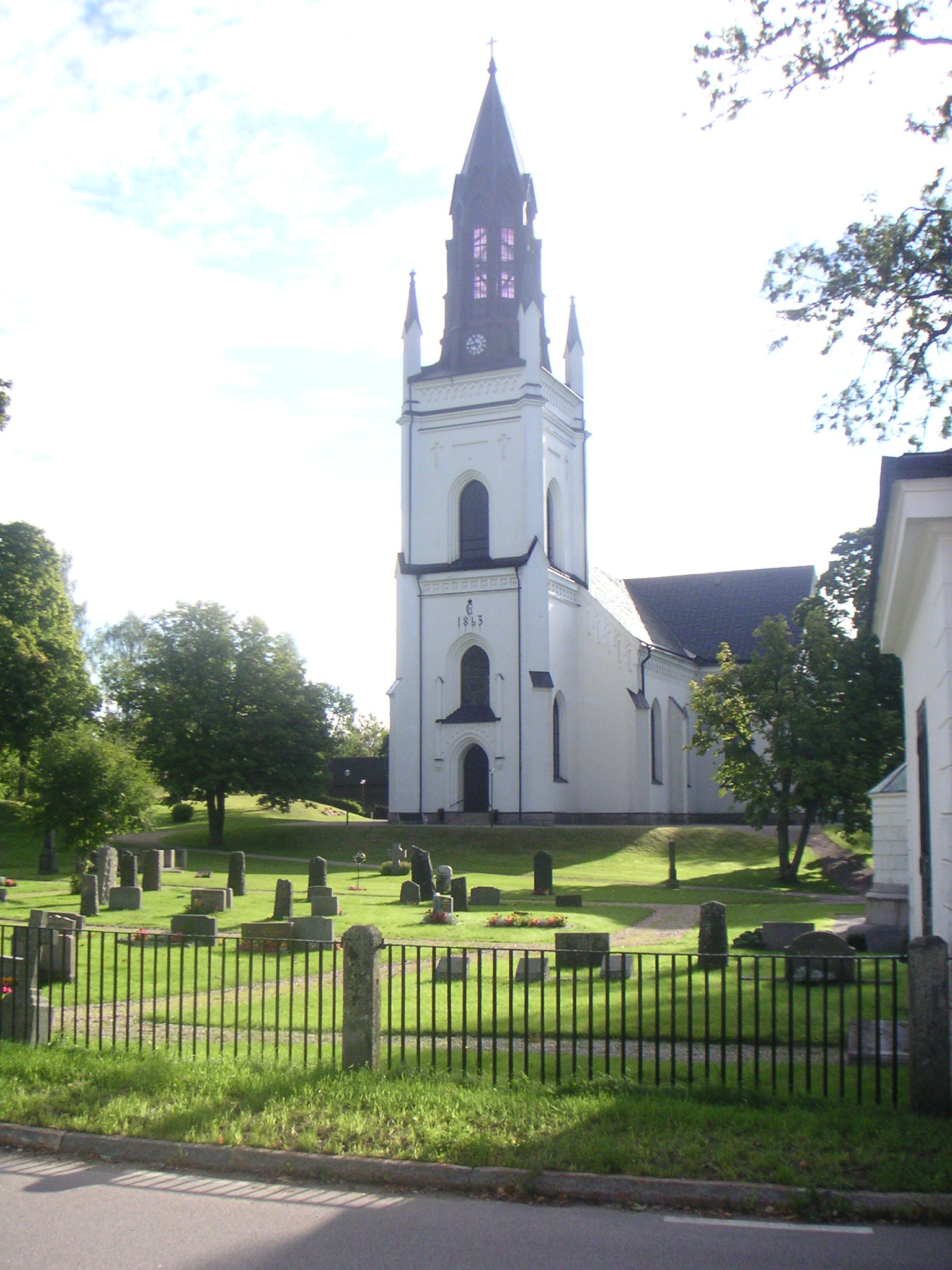
Skinnskatteberg Church

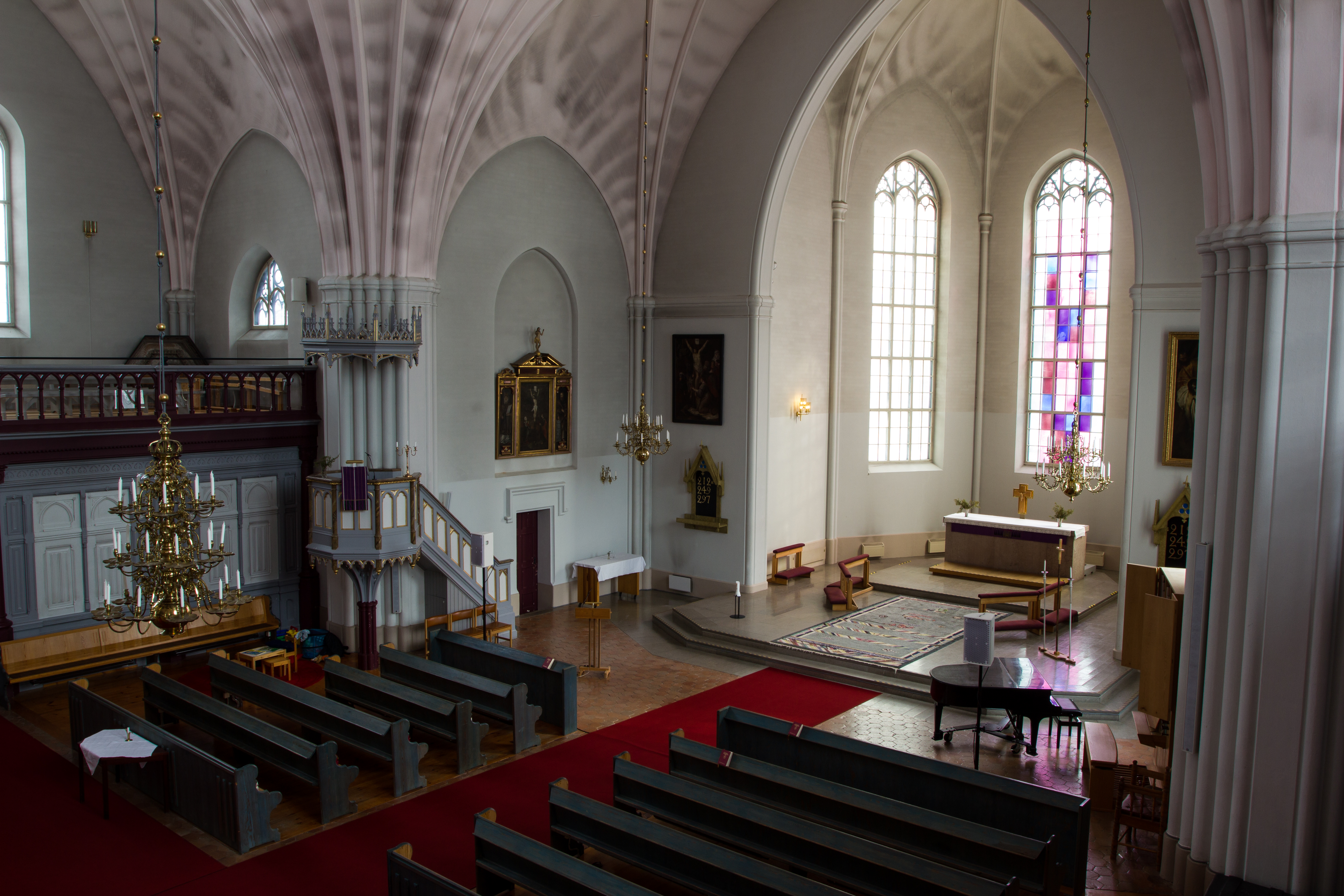
Interior
