= Johan Jakob Borelius =

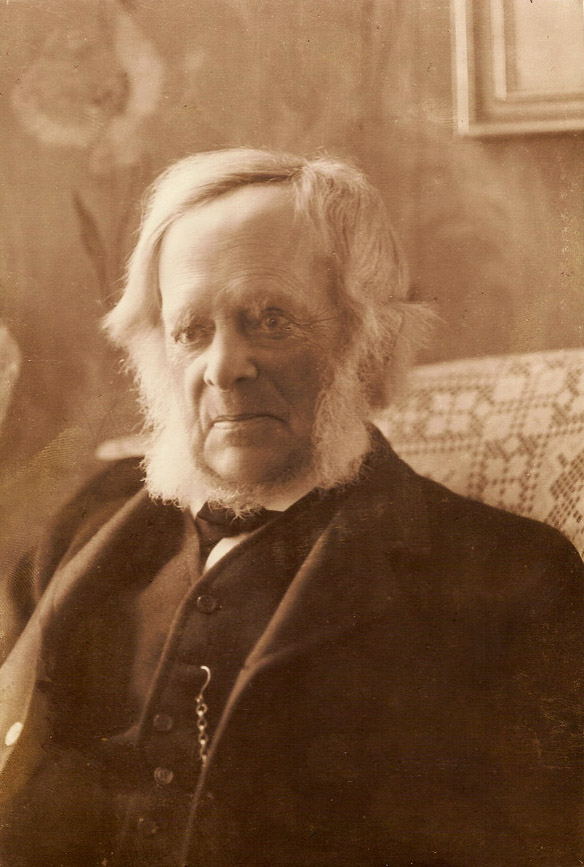
Portrait of Johan Jakob Borelius

Johan Jakob (or Jacob) Borelius (27 July 1823 – 1909) was an influential professor of theoretical philosophy at the University of Lund, Sweden from 1866 to 1898. He has been called "The Last Swedish Hegelian."

Borelius was born in Skinnskatteberg. He obtained his doctorate from Uppsala University in 1848, afterward becoming a teacher in Kalmar, while he continued his studies under Christopher Jacob Boström. His overall philosophy is laid out in his work Metafysik (metaphysics), not published in full until after his death.

Borelius is mentioned in a footnote of Jorge Luis Borges' short story "Three Versions of Judas."
