= Christopher Jacob Boström =

Swedish philosopher (1797–1866)

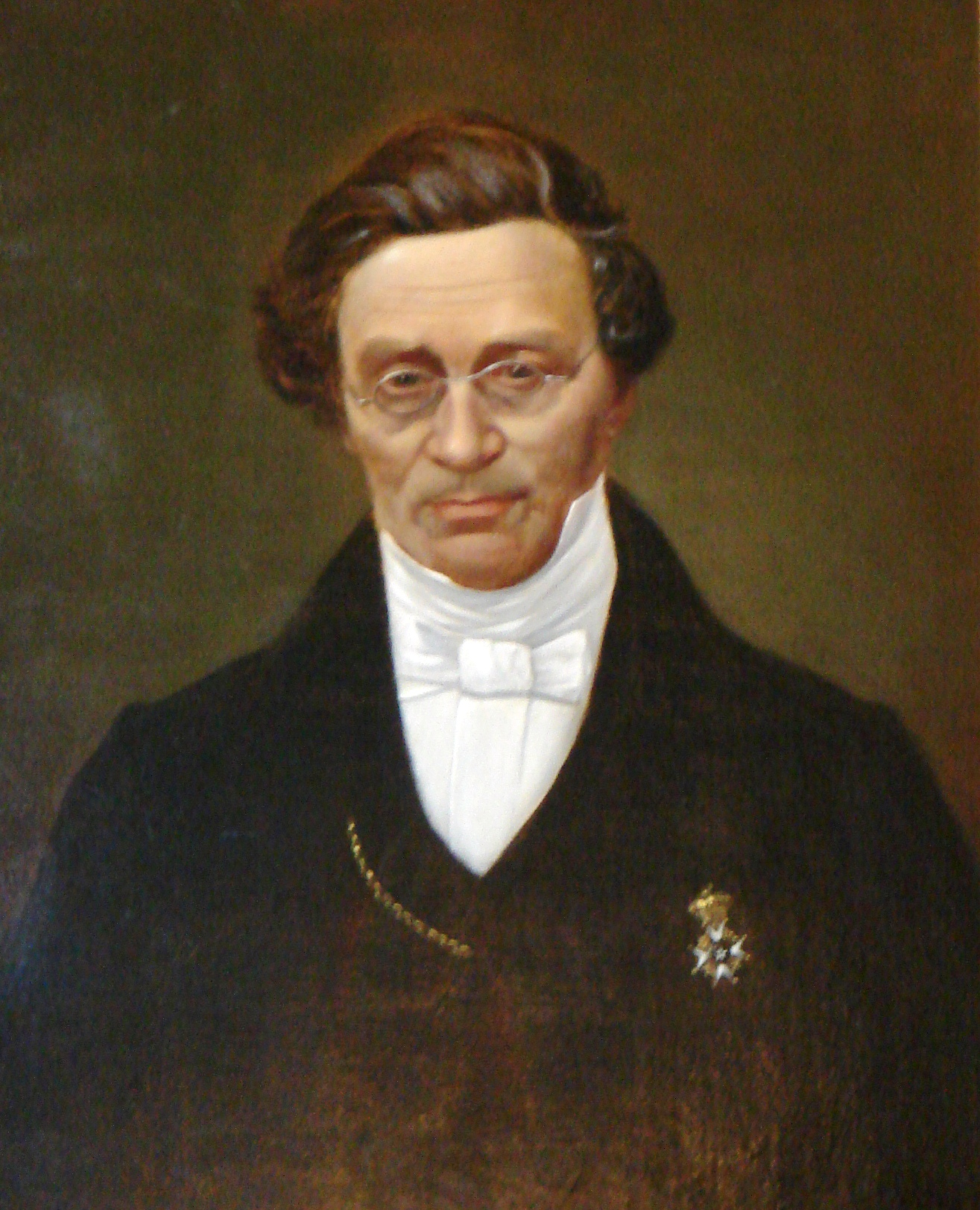
Boström: oil painting by C.J. Hällström, 1892

Christopher Jacob Boström (1 January 1797 in Piteå, Norrbotten – 22 March 1866 in Uppsala) was a Swedish philosopher. His ideas dominated Swedish philosophy until the beginning of the twentieth century. He also had a great influence on Swedish cultural life.

== Biography ==
As a student he briefly studied theology, and religion remained his primary interest throughout his life. During his theological studies, he was a classmate of Lutheran revivalist preacher Pehr Brandell.

Most of his life was spent teaching at Uppsala University, where he received the appointment in 1838 of adjunct professor of philosophy and from 1840–63 was professor of practical philosophy. He was the teacher and mentor of Johan Jakob Borelius. For four years, he tutored the royal family in Stockholm. There he was charged with the education of the crown prince, later Oscar II of Sweden.

== Philosophy ==
According to Richard Falckenberg, he was "the most important systematic thinker of his country." His philosophy, that of "rational idealism" as he termed it, exercised great influence in Sweden.

Reality is presented only as spiritual: God as an absolute, self-conscious unity, in which all living beings are eternally and unchangeably contained, according to degree. The highest aim of humanity should be the conduct and behavior according to reason in harmony with the Divine; that of the state, like the individual should exist solely in God, and in its most perfect form should consist in the harmonious obedience of all its members to a constitutional monarch; while ultimate perfection should be an all-embracing system of such states governed in obedience to Universal Reason.

According to the philosophy of Boström, true philosophy is such knowledge or awareness that is complete with respect to form, content and extent, and thus identical to God's own omniscience. Philosophy insofar as human beings can attain it, however, is identical to human awareness, insofar as it partakes of this divine omniscience: it is man's fully clear and distinct (formally perfect) awareness of true, absolute divine reality. The first task of philosophical science must be to produce the most general concepts whereby to define absolute reality. The character of Boström's philosophy depends on the manner in which he solved this task.

Personally, Boström characterizes his philosophy as the consistent execution of the principle of rational idealism—i.e., the principle of that världsåsikt (worldview or metaphysics) according to which absolute reality is free from all the imperfections of spatiotemporal existence (finitude, divisibility, transience, change). As such, it is spiritual, eternal and, in and through its own non-sensual content, and not through shifting and imperfect determinations, completely determined or completely real.

Boström claims Plato as the source of these metaphysical presuppositions. Boström interprets Plato as having conceived a limited precursor of his own philosophy, constricted by his Paganism. In Plato, the ideas constitute the absolute, whereas Boström stresses the need to move beyond the ideas to that being whose sensations they are. Boström takes himself to show that all spiritual reality necessarily refers to self-consciousness as its principle, and he maintains that true reality is personal and hence that philosophy is the science of personal beings as such, since some such thing as pure self-consciousness only exists in the abstract, whereas everything real is individual or fully determined self-consciousness (consciousness of something), or in other words, sensational being or person. Philosophy can deal with an impressional reality only insofar as this reality is conceived as a determination (sensation) for a personal being and is explained through it.

With respect to the various ways in which these beings are conceived as existing for men and determining their activities, Boström divides philosophy into theoretical philosophy, the science of these beings conceived as determining man's theoretical faculty, i.e., conceived as in every respect true and original being; and practical philosophy, the science of these beings conceived as determining the practical faculty, or will, of man, i.e., conceived as that which unconditionally and under all circumstances ought to be. According to the different kinds of personal beings that are known to us, theoretical philosophy is further divided into speculative theology, speculative ethnology and speculative anthropology; practical philosophy into philosophy of religion, philosophy of law and ethics, corresponding to the terms of the division of theoretical philosophy

=== Theoretical philosophy ===
==== Speculative theology ====
In speculative theology, the science of the absolute person, or God, Boström gives a more detailed justification of the principle of his system. There, it is first of all maintained that independent reality necessarily must be spiritual (or, as we would say today, mental), and as such an independent consciousness or self-consciousness. This is the only thing that is simple. Since the complex presupposes the simple, self-consciousness must also be the ultimate principle of all reality. This self-consciousness — which Boström identifies with life—can thus not be conceived as attached to a substrate or a substance, but is precisely what is primary and original in everything.

Boström further accounts for the factors that constitute individual self-consciousness or the person. I contrast to the Hegelian notion of an original abstract, empty self-consciousness which, through sensible reality, actualizes itself into a fully conscious and determined (concrete) spirit, Boström maintains that the absolute person is primordial and eternally fully determined. It has its sensations fully present to itself, and does not require for its perfect determination an imperfect world. There exists no exclusion or contradiction among the sensations or ideas of God, but there is complete accord among them, so that it is impossible to conceive perfectly either of God or of any of His ideas without also conceiving the others perfectly. Boström has thereby shown that absolute reality is an absolute system, a spiritual organism in the strongest sense of the term.

Since in every organism, the organs must possess the character of the whole, it follows that God's ideas are also personal or perceiving beings. Although these beings in and for God, qua his organs, are absolutely perfect, in and for themselves, qua perceiving beings, they possess a certain imperfection, precisely since they do not have their true life and self-consciousness in themselves, but in God. Therefore, true reality, God's reality without which nothing exists, is presented to them in a lower form, as a world of phenomena specific to each and every one of them. Conceived with respect to these beings, God is on the one hand more than all of them put together or some aspect or attribute common to all of them; he is an independent and fully concrete being. On the other hand, He is also — due to the perfect organic coherence that obtains in the absolute world — fully present in them, without in the least obstructing their independent life. Thereby, the contradiction between finite and infinite is resolved.

The infinite is present in the finite, while fully preserving its infinitude (and thus not through any "anderssein" or similar). God is simultaneously transcendent and an immanent ground for the finite world, and in so far as this world, qua finite, is undergoing a developmental process, he is the foundation, law and endpoint of this development, the creator and maintainer of the finite world, its providence and salvation. In relation to this, Boström develops a teodicé where he teaches that all imperfection and all evil depends entirely on finite beings, whereas God, as a perfect being, cannot be the ground of anything but the eternal life and salvation of these lesser beings.

== Works ==
His major work was Philosophy of Religion. His writings, comparatively few in number, edited by Edfelt, were published at Upsala in 1883.

== Family ==
He was the paternal uncle of Erik Gustaf Boström.
