= Gunnilbo Church =

- Gunnilbo kyrka
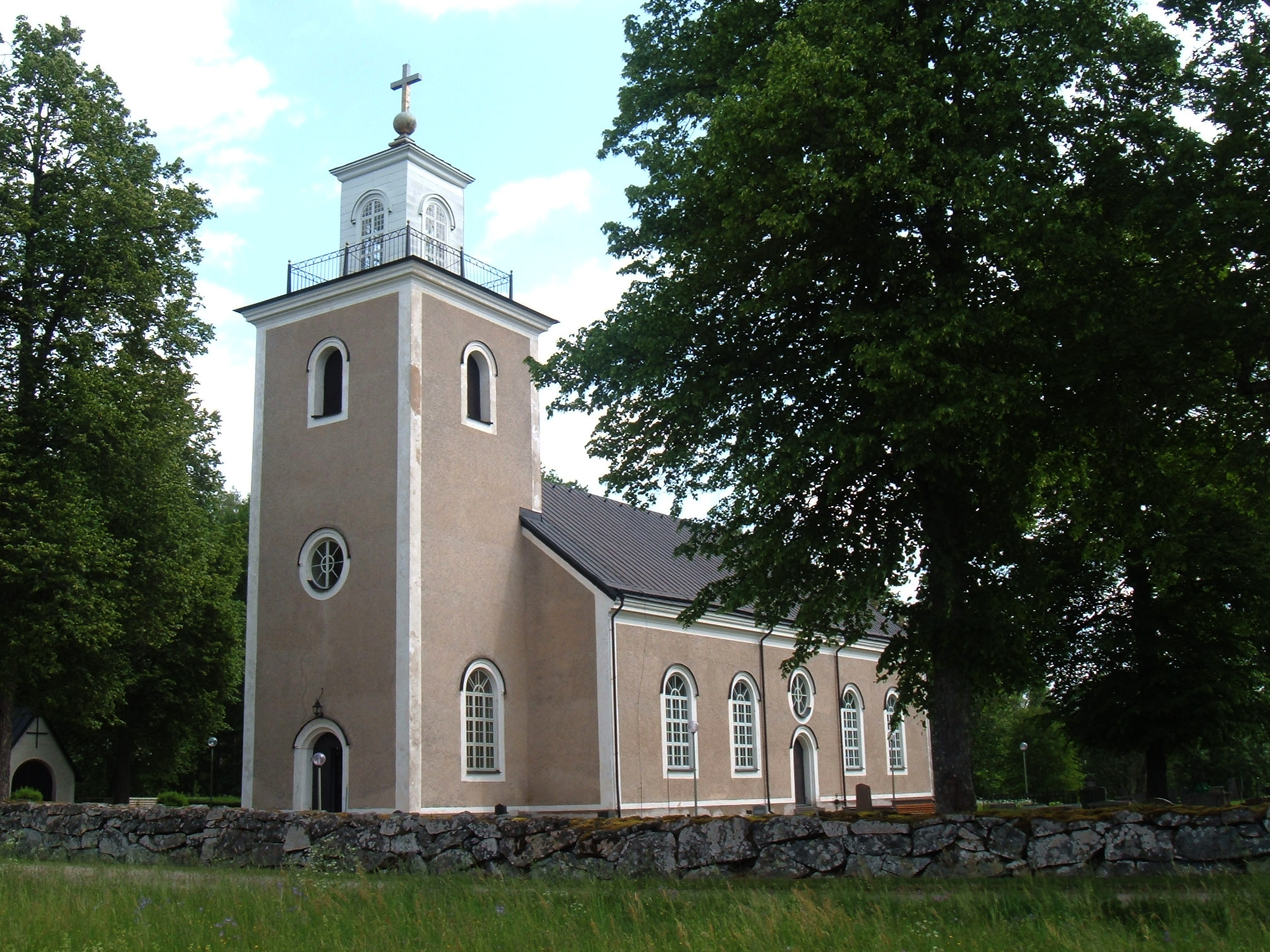
- Gunnilbo Church in 2006
- Gunnilbo Church
- 59°48′18″N 15°51′03″E
- Location: Gunnilbo socken
- Country: Sweden
- Denomination: Church of Sweden
- Website: Gunnilbo kyrka

History
- Founded: 4 October 1835

Administration
- Diocese: Diocese of Västerås
- Parish: Skinnskatteberg med Hed och Gunnilbo församling

Gunnilbo Church (Swedish: Gunnilbo kyrka) is a church in Gunnilbo socken, Sweden. It was built between 1825 and 1835, and was inaugurated 4 October 1835.

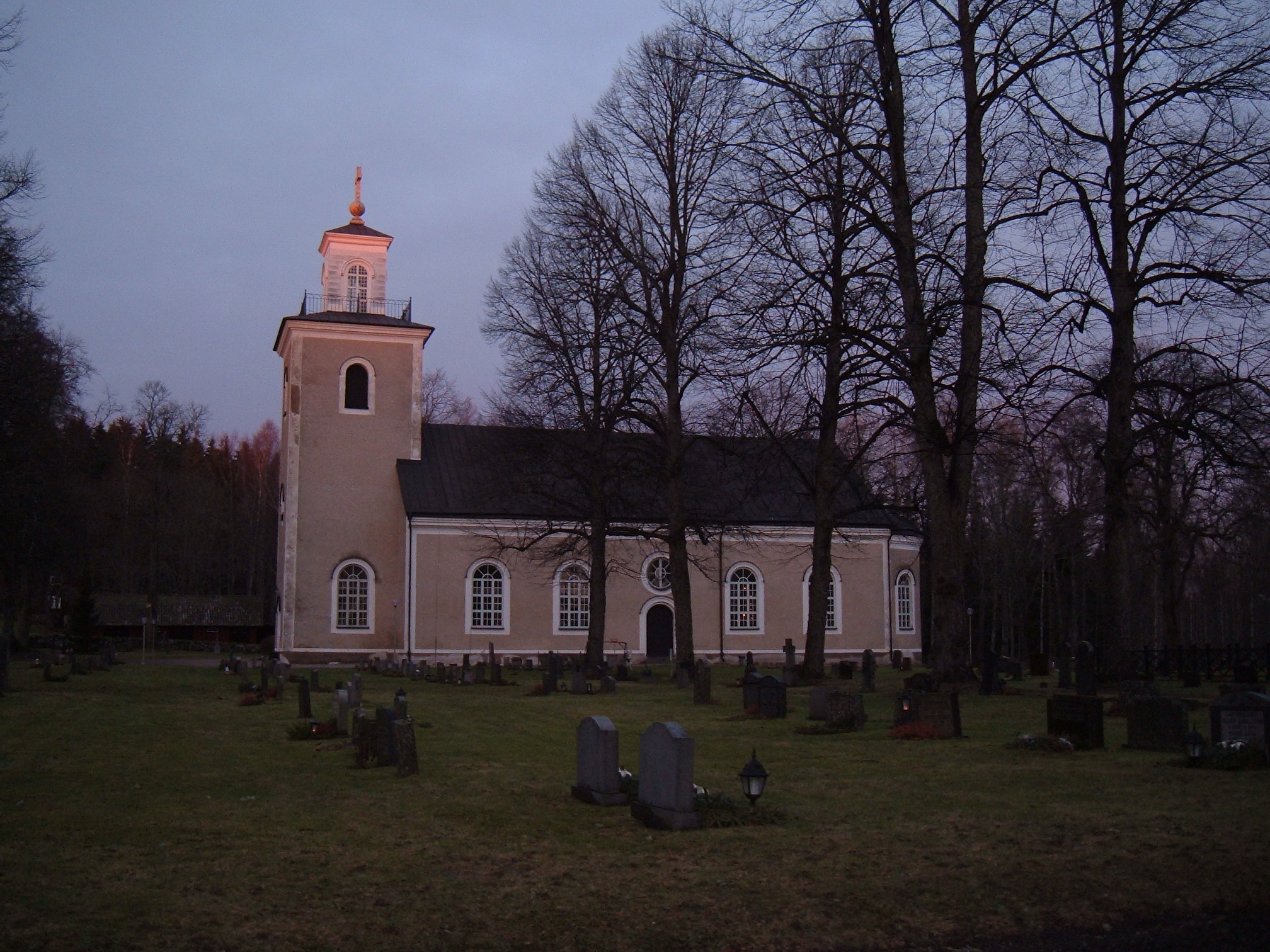
Gunnilbo Church

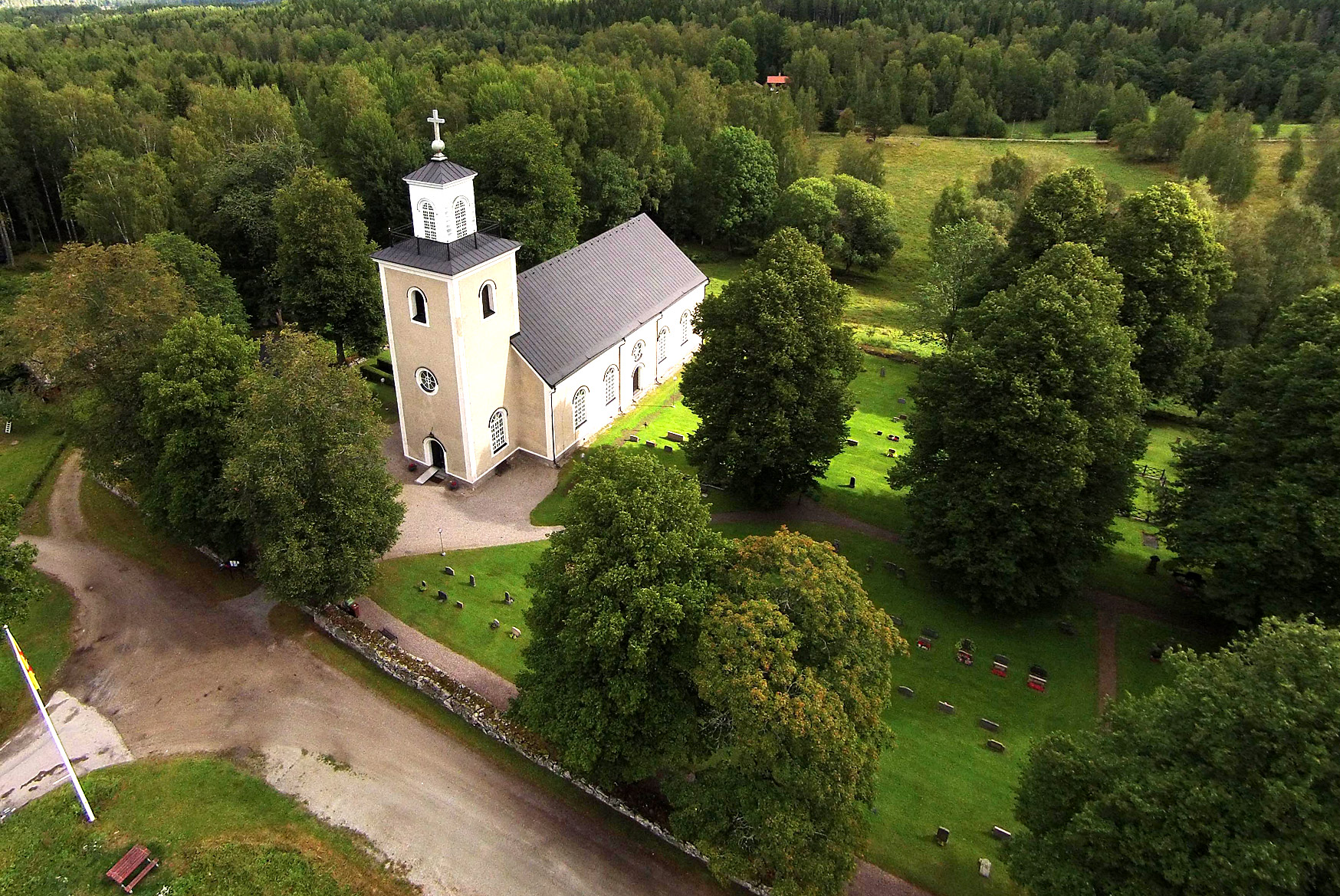
Aerial photo

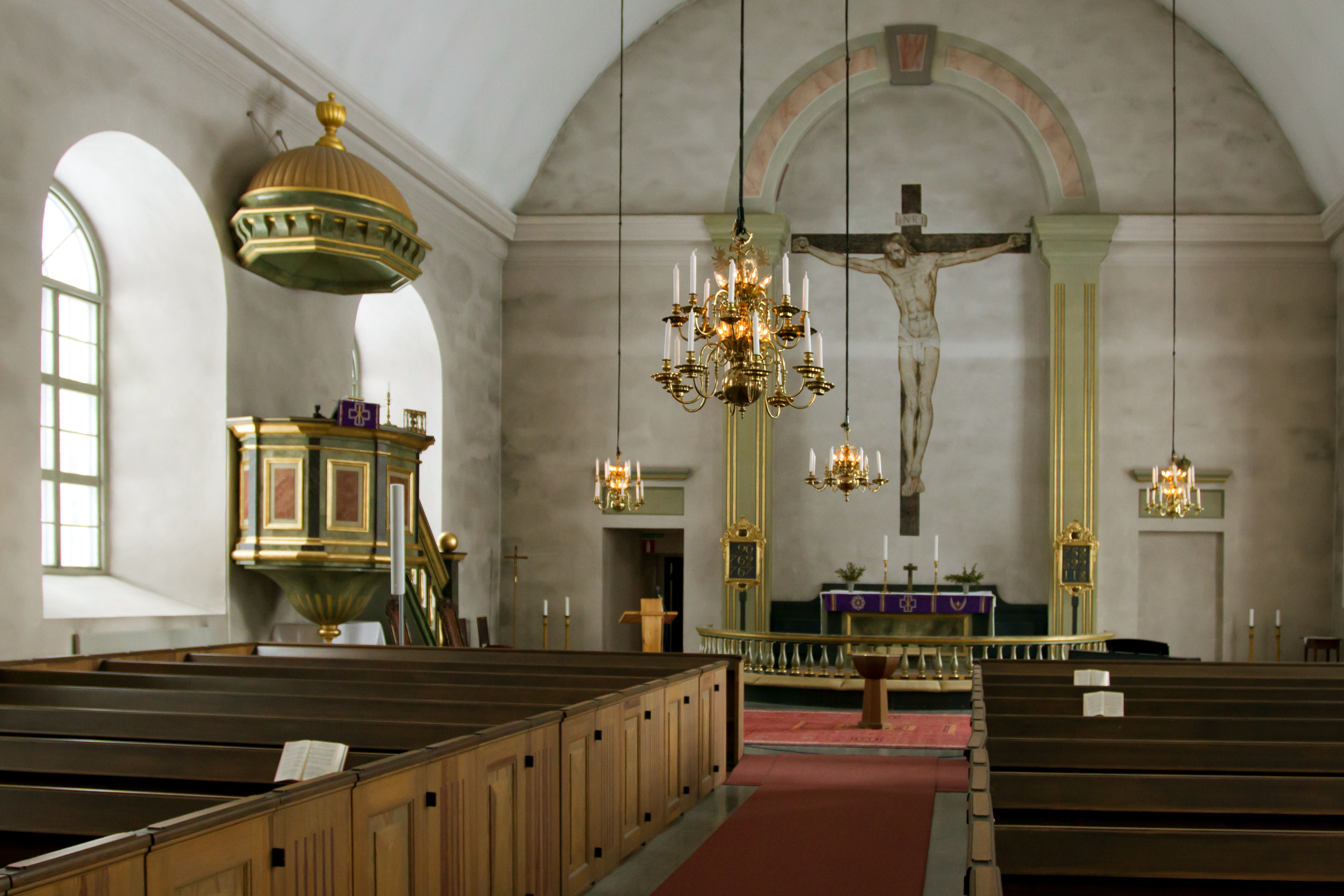
Nave
