= Färna =

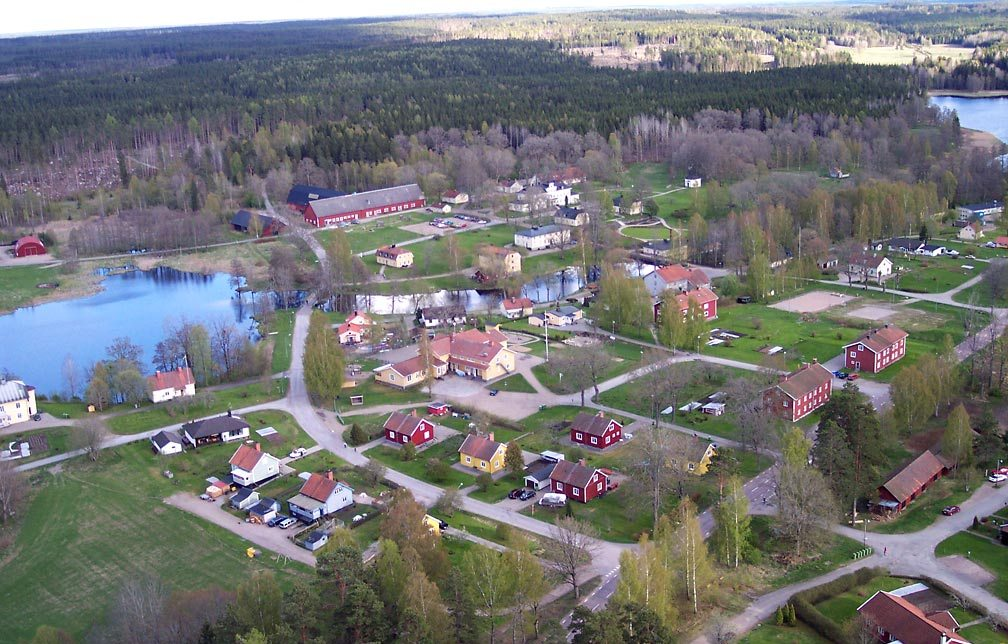

- Location within Västmanland Location within Sweden
- Coordinates: 59°46′52″N 15°51′37″E
- Country: Sweden
- Province: Västmanland
- County: Västmanland County
- Municipality: Skinnskatteberg Municipality

Area
  - Total: 0.29 km^{2} (0.11 sq mi)

Population (31 December 2010)
  - Total: 145
  - Density: 495/km^{2} (1,280/sq mi)
- Time zone: UTC+1 (CET)
  - Summer (DST): UTC+2 (CEST)

Färna (or "Färna + Bäck") is a village situated in Skinnskatteberg Municipality, Västmanland County, Sweden with 145 inhabitants in 2010.
