= Hedd =

Hedd may refer to:

- Hedd Wyn, Welsh-language poet
- Hedd Records, a subsidiary label of Virgin Records
- Harold Hedd, a comic strip by Rand Holmes
- HEDD, a bogus explosives-detection device; see Sniffex
- Hedd. – Botanist Terry Albert John Hedderson (born 1962)
