= HED Cycling Products =

US bicycle wheel manufacturer

- Company type: Private
- Industry: Cycling, Manufacturing
- Founded: 1980s
- Founders: Steven Hed; Anne Hed
- Headquarters: Roseville, Minnesota, U.S.
- Website: https://hedcycling.com/

HED Cycling Products is a bicycle wheel manufacturer located in Roseville, Minnesota.

HED Cycling is a company that specializes in designing and manufacturing high-performance bicycle wheels and components. The company was founded by Steve and Anne Hed in 1984 and has since become well-regarded in the cycling community for producing aerodynamic, lightweight, and innovative wheels.

HED offers a variety of wheelsets designed for different cycling disciplines, including road racing, triathlon, gravel riding, and fat biking. The company is known for its pioneering work in aerodynamics and for introducing innovations such as the use of wider rims for improved stability and handling.The company continues to be a significant player in the cycling industry, contributing to advancements in wheel technology and design.

HED wheels are used in the Olympics, the Tour de France, and various Ironman competitions. Lance Armstrong is known as one of the first proponents of HED wheels.

In 2017, HED Cycling made the Forbes annual list of Small Giants, which named it one of 25 of the best small companies in the United States.

Steve Hed, one of the two founders of HED Cycling, died in 2014. Following the sudden passing of Steve, Anne Hed assumed the role of CEO.

Since 2014, the company has continued expanding its product lines to include new segments like gravel and fat biking, introduced advanced wheel models, and formed collaborations, such as the frames for the Cervélo P5X superbike and partnerships with local Minnesota manufacturing companies. The company continues to hand-build the wheels in Minnesota.
