= Karmansbo =

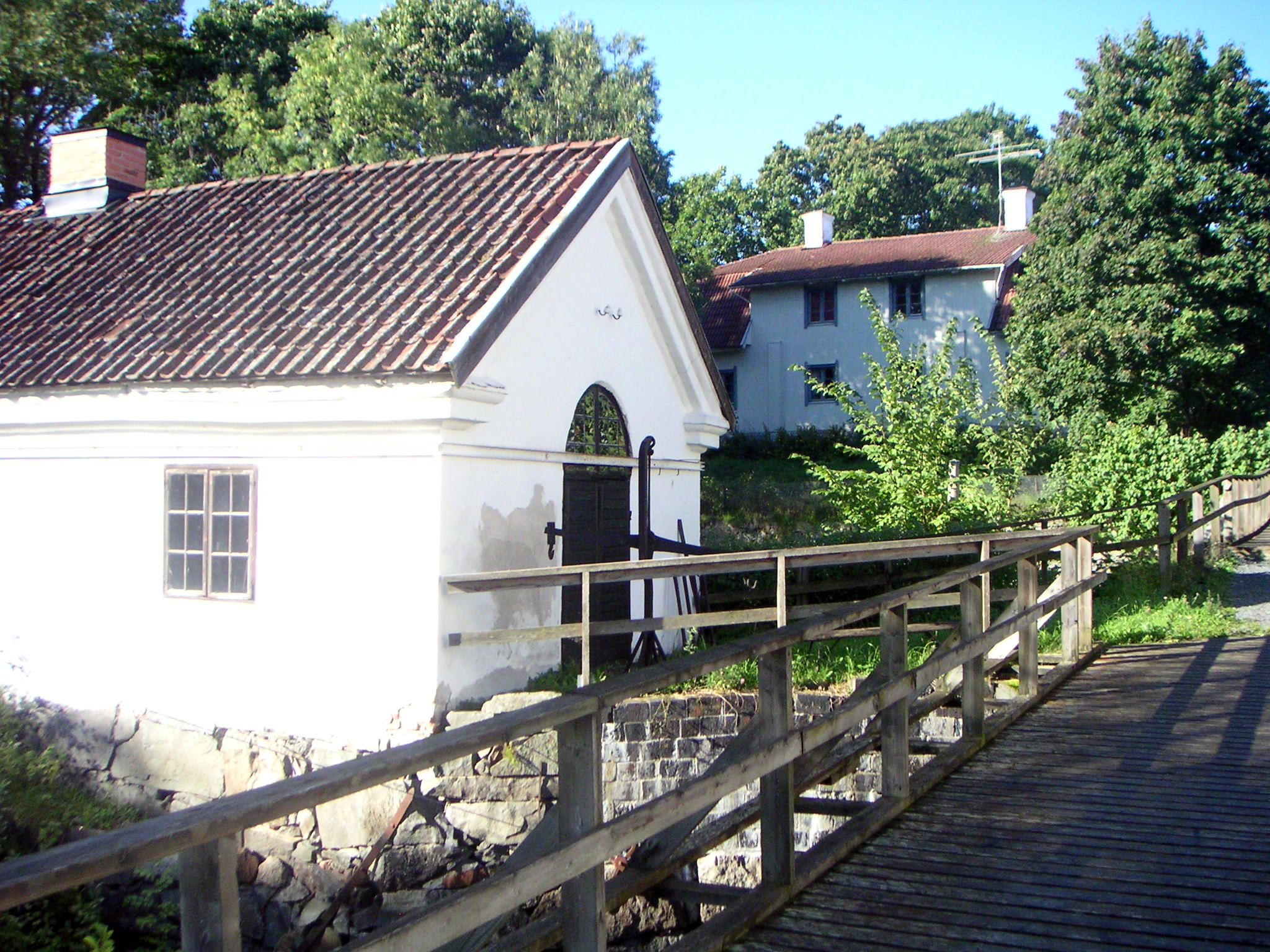
- The power station in Karmansbo.

- Location within Västmanland Location within Sweden
- Coordinates: 59°42′N 15°45′E
- Country: Sweden
- Province: Västmanland
- County: Västmanland County
- Municipality: Skinnskatteberg Municipality

Area
  - Total: 0.47 km^{2} (0.18 sq mi)

Population (31 December 2010)
  - Total: 91
  - Density: 195/km^{2} (510/sq mi)
- Time zone: UTC+1 (CET)
  - Summer (DST): UTC+2 (CEST)

Karmansbo (Swedish pronunciation: [ˈkârːmansˌbuː]) is a mining village situated in Skinnskatteberg Municipality, Västmanland County, Sweden with 91 inhabitants in 2010.
