= Skinnskatteberg Municipality =

Skinnskatteberg Municipality Skinnskattebergs kommun
- Municipality
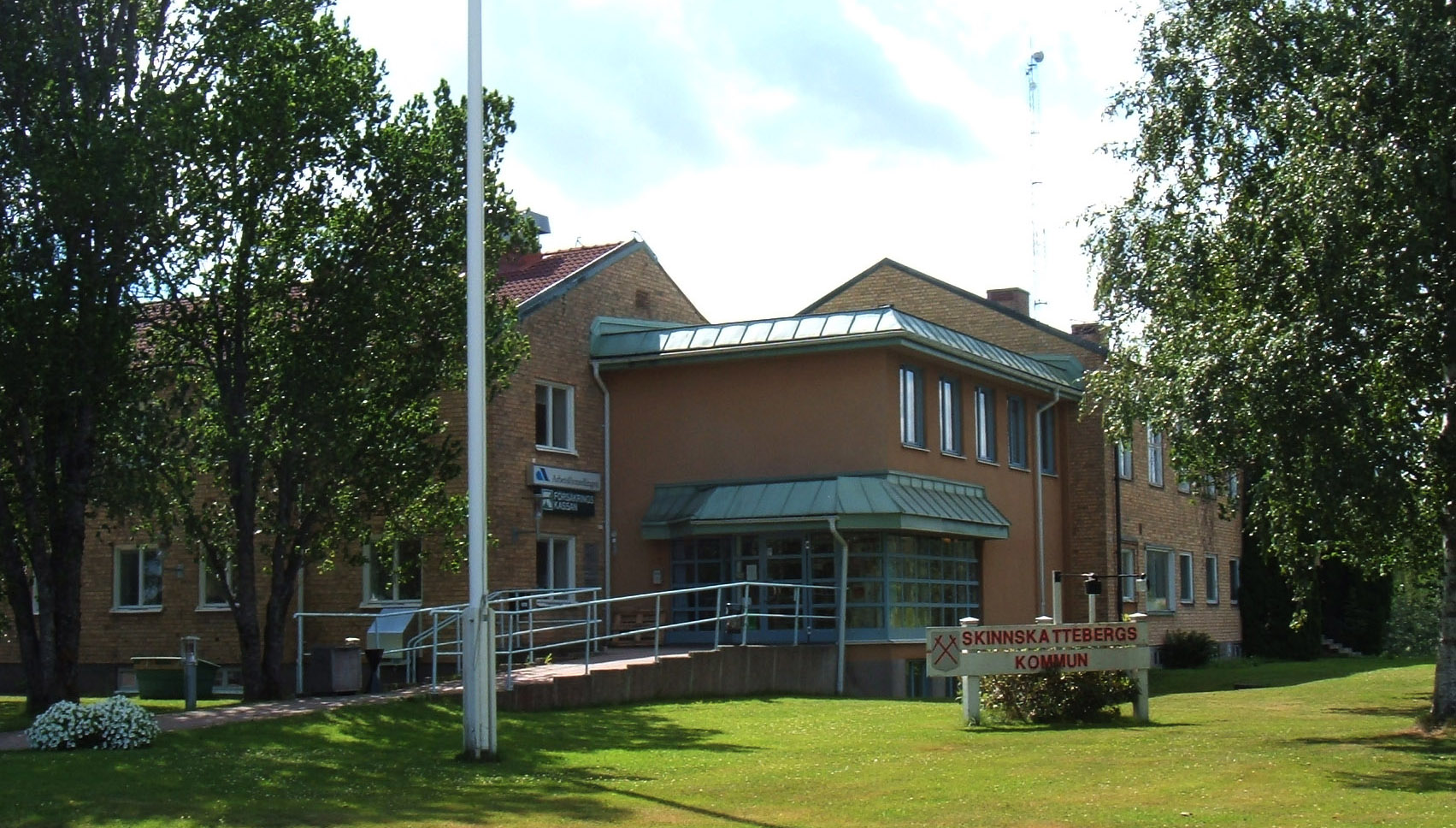
- Skinnskatteberg town hall

- Coat of arms

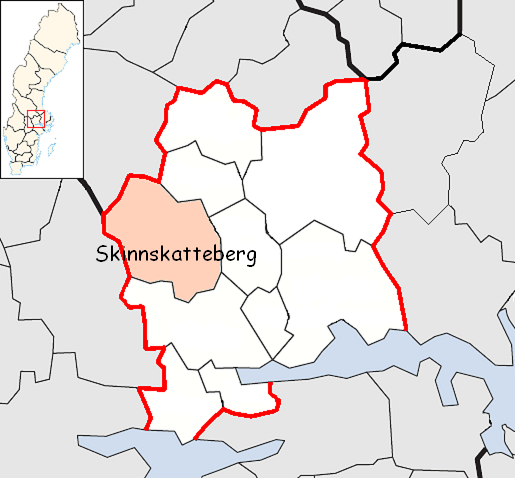
- Coordinates: 59°50′N 15°41′E
- Country: Sweden
- County: Västmanland County
- Seat: Skinnskatteberg

Area
  - Total: 718.18 km^{2} (277.29 sq mi)
  - Land: 659.43 km^{2} (254.61 sq mi)
  - Water: 58.75 km^{2} (22.68 sq mi)
- Area as of 1 January 2014.

Population (30 June 2025)
  - Total: 4,219
  - Density: 6.398/km^{2} (16.57/sq mi)
- Time zone: UTC+1 (CET)
  - Summer (DST): UTC+2 (CEST)
- ISO 3166 code: SE
- Province: Västmanland
- Municipal code: 1904
- Website: www.skinnskatteberg.se

Skinnskatteberg Municipality (Swedish: Skinnskattebergs kommun) is a municipality in Västmanland County in central Sweden. Its seat is located in the town of Skinnskatteberg.

In 1952 a new greater municipality was created when "old" Skinskatteberg was merged with Gunnilbo and Hed. The next subdivision reform of 1971 did not affect this entity.

== Geography ==
8% of the area consists of water (streams or lakes). Good possibilities for outdoor activities such as walking, hunting and fishing.

=== Localities ===
- Riddarhyttan
- Skinnskatteberg (seat)

Minor localities:

- Färna
- Karmansbo
- Kärrbo

=== Nature reserves ===
As of 2022, there are 20 nature reserves in Skinnskatteberg Municipality.

- Baggå
- Forsån
- Grisnäs
- Hedströmmen
- Klockarbo
- Klockljungsreservaten
- Lappland
- Malingsbo-Kloten
- Matkullen
- Ormdalen
- Passboberget
- Råmyran
- Skommarmossen
- Stora Flyten
- Sunnanfors
- Utterdalen
- Vargberget
- Venabäcken
- Årsbäcken and Örtjärnsskogen

== History ==
The area was known as Skinnsäckeberg in the medieval age, which translates to "Skinsack mountain", perhaps referring to skinsacks used to carry material up to the mountains, but no one knows for sure.

The area, located within the Mining district of Central Sweden (Bergslagen) was a mining district since the 14th century, mostly for iron, but copper was also mined for.

== Demographics ==
This is a demographic table based on Skinnskatteberg Municipality's electoral districts in the 2022 Swedish general election sourced from SVT's election platform, in turn taken from SCB official statistics.

In total there were 4,361 residents, including 3,403 Swedish citizens of voting age. 46.4% voted for the left coalition and 52.5% for the right coalition. Indicators are in percentage points except population totals and income.

Location	Residents	Citizen adults	Left vote	Right vote	Employed	Swedish parents	Foreign heritage	Income SEK	Degree
Location			%	%					
Skinnskatteberg N	2,369	1,768	48.2	50.8	74	71	29	21,991	22
Skinnskatteberg S	1,992	1,635	44.4	54.3	77	83	17	23,913	28
Source: SVT

== Cultural life ==
The municipality has a flowering cultural life with several theatre groups. There is an annual choral meeting, among other music activities. A pride is Galleri Astley in Uttersberg, which is an internationally renowned art center and gallery with around 100 000 visits annually.

Ekomuseum Bergslagen shows the history and culture of iron. It is a museum without walls consisting more than 50 different objects, extending through six municipalities. Twelve of those objects are situated in Skinnskatteberg.

Röda Jorden (The Red Soil) is Sweden's to date oldest iron preparation site, active between 700 BC to 200 AD. There is a reconstruction of a furnace and a roasting hearth used to demonstrate the process. You can book a day of activities or for a shorter guidetour. You can also discover the area by yourself.

Kopparverket (The Copper Works) at Riddarhyttan has seen industrial activity since the Middle Ages. There are many buildings, ponds and ruins standing and a posted path to show the way.

Lienshyttan (The Blast Furnace of Lienshyttan) is from 1847. The Bastnäs mineral and mine area is one of the world's richest mineral sites.

Färna bruk is an ironworks from the 16th century with a stately manor. There is also a remarkable mausoleum and a pavilion with lovely paintings. The manor house is a hotel sometime visited by the King of Sweden Carl XlV Gustav.

The Karmansbo bruksmiljö is a well-preserved industrial area with a mansion, workers residences, Lancashire forges and works office. The manor house is a hotel there too. You can see the forges in work in one day in July every year or you can book it for a day of your own.

Ebba Brahes pavilion lies on an island below the Bockhammar manor, probably the oldest pavilion in the country.

This one is an octagonal, pink pavilion built in the 17th century. There is a summer café close.

== Outdoor activities ==
The area has great possibilities for a rich outdoor life. There are 244 lakes and most of them are available for fishing. Fishing is a widely spread activity in the district and attracts a lot of visitors. In most of the lakes you can take a swim. You can walk the Bruksleden Trail or the Ormdalen path in the Ormdalen area, which is a geologically interesting phenomenon. You can also take a trip along the canoe trails. The municipality has 13 nature reserves of different kinds. You can walk in the footsteps of the Pilgrims. Romboleden, the trail of Rombo, leads from Köping to Trondheim in Norway where Saint Olov is buried, and passes Skinnskatteberg on its way.

== Notability ==
The municipality has among the most mansions of Sweden's municipalities: Baggå, Bernshammars, Färna, Jönsarbo, Karmansbo, Nyhammars, Skinnskatteberg and Uttersberg.

The mansion of Skinskatteberg is particularly well known. It was constructed in 1779 by architect Wilhelm Hising. Every year a choir assembly is held by the mansion.

== See also ==
- Mining in Sweden
