= Skinnskatteberg =

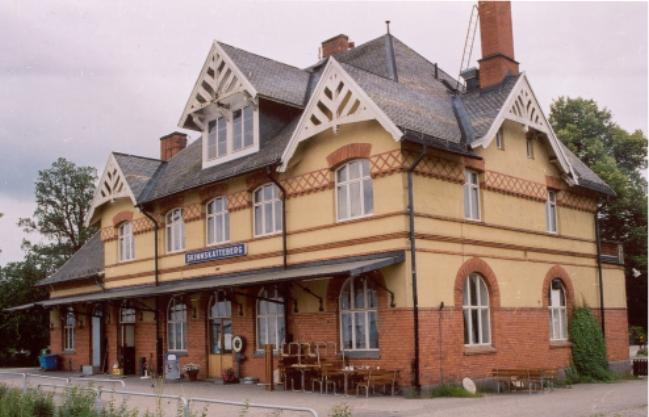
- Skinnskatteberg railway station

- Location within Västmanland Location within Sweden
- Coordinates: 59°50′N 15°41′E
- Country: Sweden
- Province: Västmanland
- County: Västmanland County
- Municipality: Skinnskatteberg Municipality

Area
  - Total: 2.92 km^{2} (1.13 sq mi)

Population (31 December 2010)
  - Total: 2,287
  - Density: 785/km^{2} (2,030/sq mi)
- Time zone: UTC+1 (CET)
  - Summer (DST): UTC+2 (CEST)

Skinnskatteberg (Swedish pronunciation: [ɧɪnskatɛˈbærj]) is a locality and the seat of Skinnskatteberg Municipality in Västmanland County, Sweden with 2,287 inhabitants in 2010.

== Notable people ==
- Johan Jakob Borelius (1823 – 1909), professor of theoretical philosophy
- Rune Jansson, Wrestler

== Gallery ==
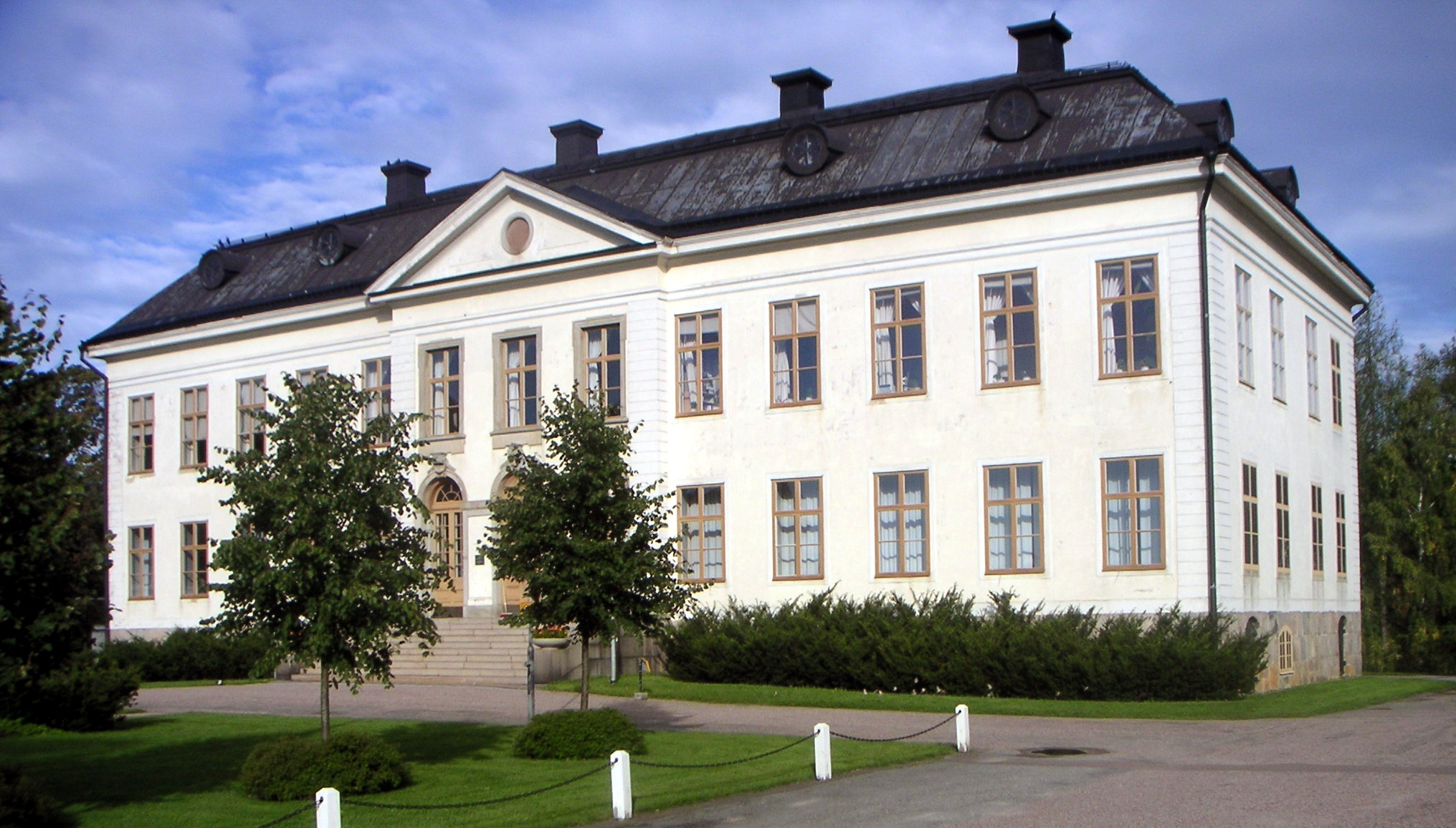
Skinnskatteberg mansion

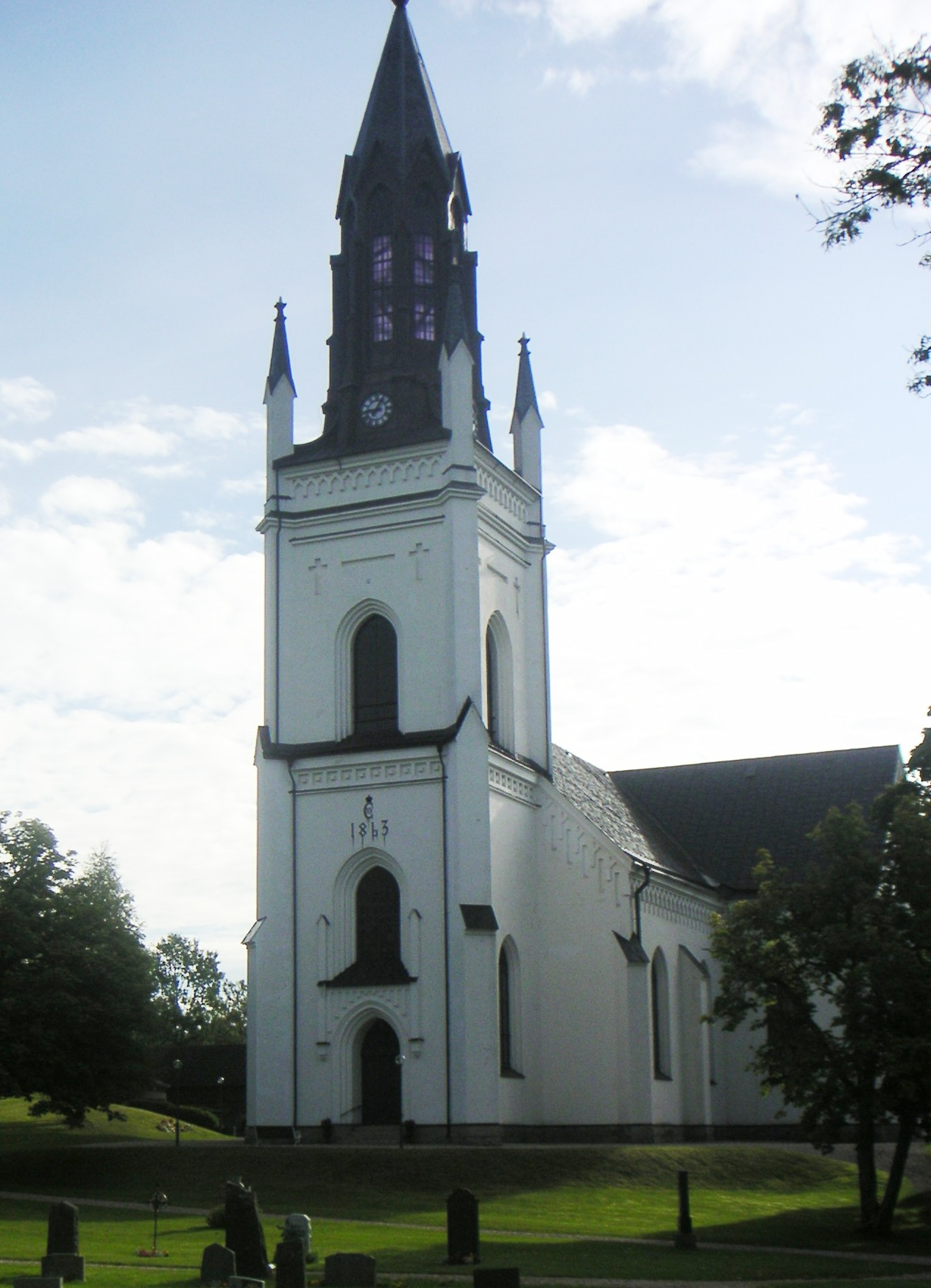
Skinnskatteberg Church

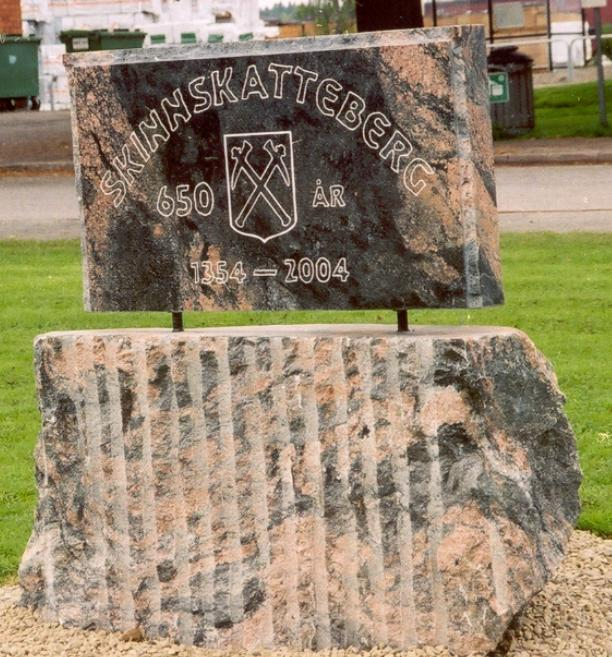
Skinnskatteberg 650 years
