= Vidöåsen =

- Location within Sweden
- Coordinates: 59°21′N 13°27′E
- Country: Sweden
- Province: Värmland
- County: Värmland County
- Municipality: Hammarö Municipality

Area
  - Total: 0.30 km^{2} (0.12 sq mi)

Population (31 December 2010)
  - Total: 272
  - Density: 898/km^{2} (2,330/sq mi)
- Time zone: UTC+1 (CET)
  - Summer (DST): UTC+2 (CEST)

Vidöåsen is a locality situated in Hammarö Municipality, Värmland County, Sweden with 272 inhabitants in 2010.
