= Skoghall =

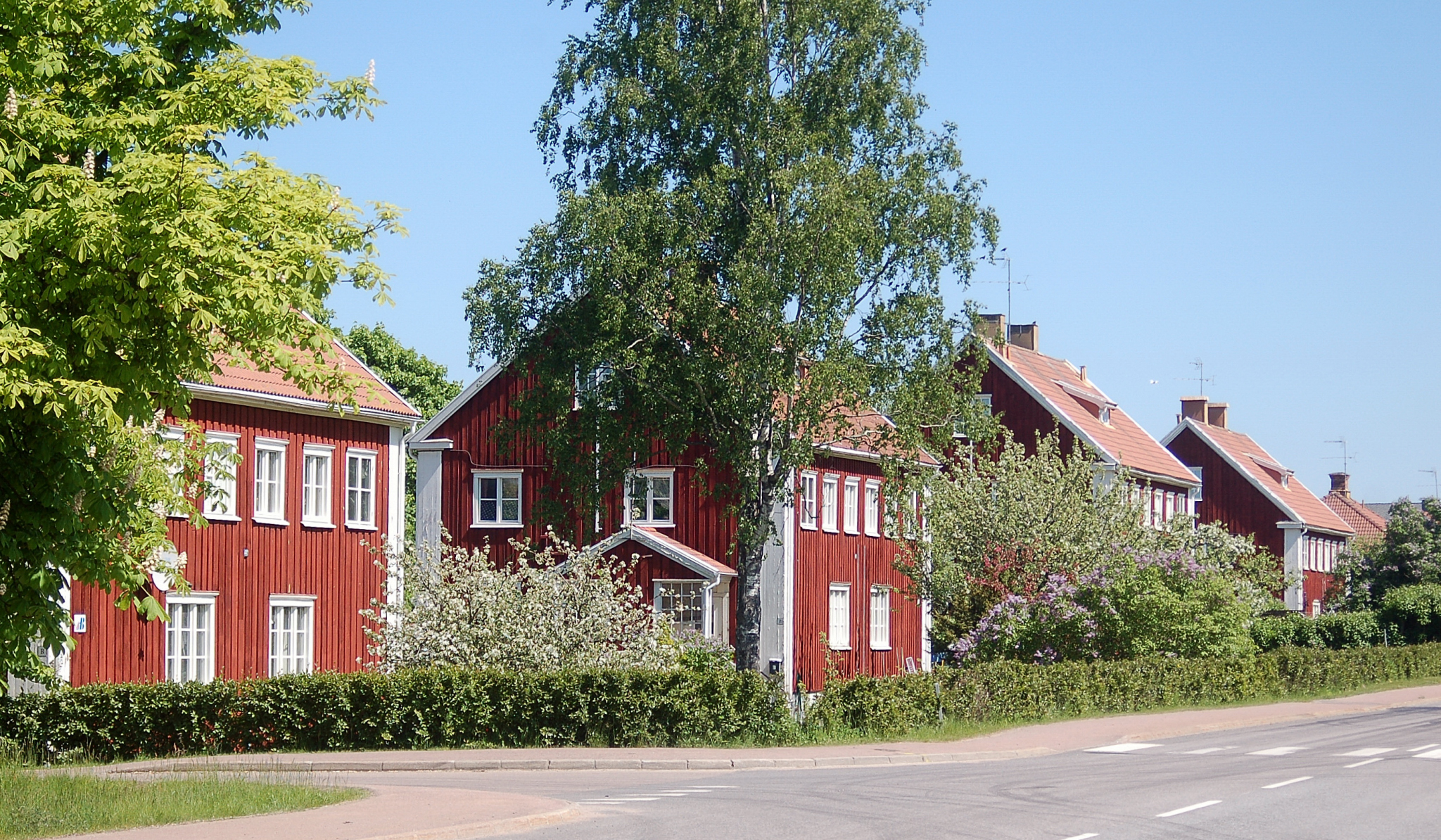
- Skoghall

- Location within Sweden
- Coordinates: 59°20′N 13°26′E
- Country: Sweden
- Province: Värmland
- County: Värmland County
- Municipality: Hammarö Municipality

Area
  - Total: 10.61 km^{2} (4.10 sq mi)

Population (31 December 2010)
  - Total: 13,265
  - Density: 1,251/km^{2} (3,240/sq mi)
- Time zone: UTC+1 (CET)
  - Summer (DST): UTC+2 (CEST)

Skoghall (meaning 'forest-covered hillock') is a locality and the seat of Hammarö Municipality in Värmland County, Sweden with 13,265 inhabitants in 2010. Stora Enso, with paper mill and manufacturing, is the largest employer. With the second largest being Akzo Nobel Base Chemicals AB. Skoghall is located on the island of Hammarö and is considered a suburb of Karlstad, being situated only 7km from the cities center.
