= Hammarö Municipality =

Hammarö Municipality Hammarö kommun
- Municipality
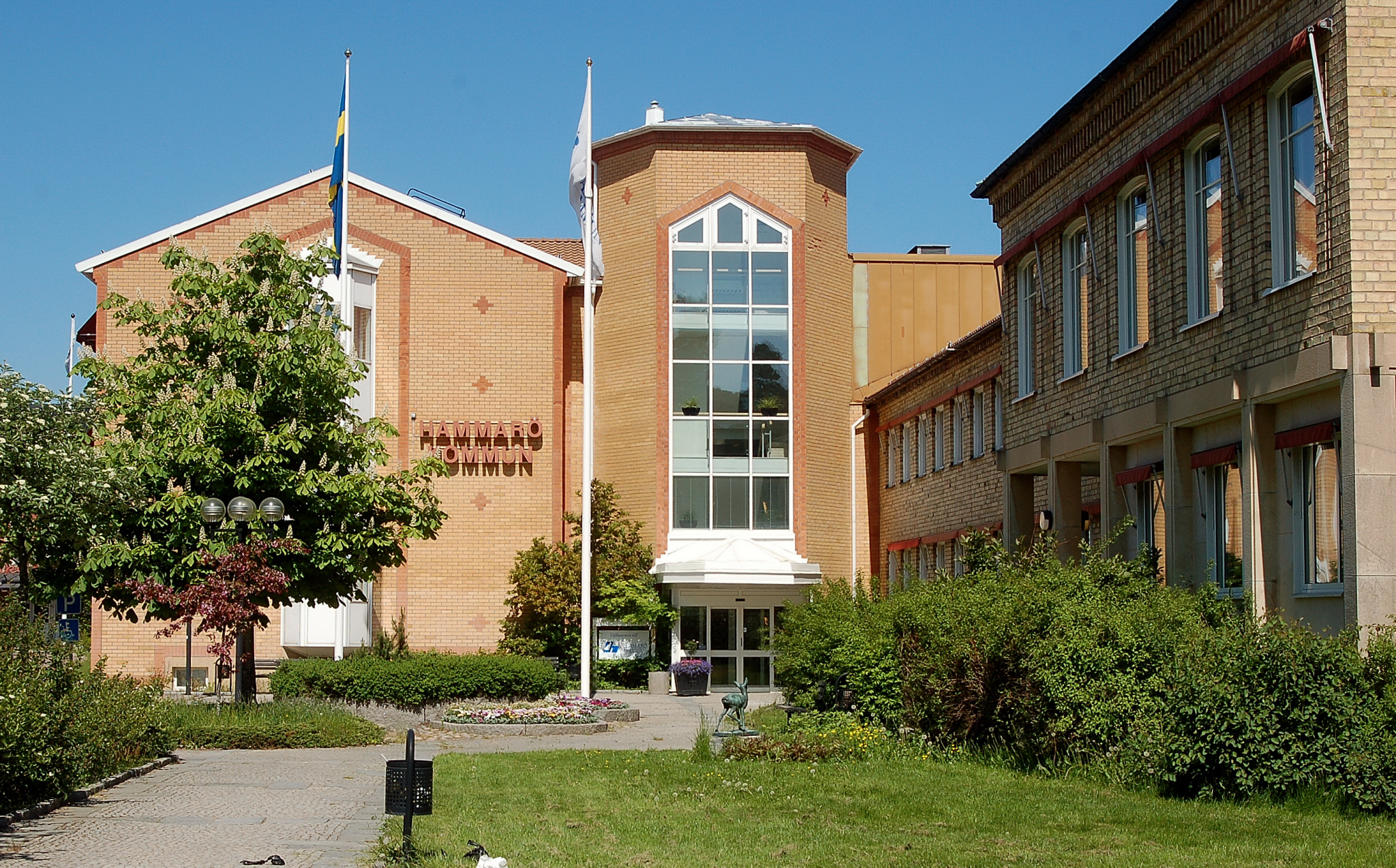
- Hammarö City Hall

- Coat of arms

- Coordinates: 59°20′N 13°26′E
- Country: Sweden
- County: Värmland County
- Seat: Skoghall

Area
  - Total: 464.16 km^{2} (179.21 sq mi)
  - Land: 59.59 km^{2} (23.01 sq mi)
  - Water: 404.57 km^{2} (156.21 sq mi)
- Area as of 1 January 2014.

Population (30 June 2025)
  - Total: 16,987
  - Density: 285.1/km^{2} (738.3/sq mi)
- Time zone: UTC+1 (CET)
  - Summer (DST): UTC+2 (CEST)
- ISO 3166 code: SE
- Province: Värmland
- Municipal code: 1761
- Website: www.hammaro.se

Hammarö Municipality (Swedish: Hammarö kommun) is a municipality in Värmland County in west central Sweden. Its seat is located in the town of Skoghall.

The municipality was created from Hammarö parish in 1863, and its territory has not been affected by the great municipal reforms of 1952 and 1971. With a land area of only 56.9 square kilometres (22.0 sq mi) it is Sweden's 12th smallest, as well as the smallest in Värmland County.

== Geography ==
The municipality consists of the islands Hammarön and Vidön and the adjacent archipelago. The name Hammarö, or Hammarön (the name of the island itself), refers to hammare, a rocky area where deciduous trees grow. The island itself is 47 square kilometres (18 sq mi) large, the third largest island of Lake Vänern, and located off the shore of Värmland, separated by the Klarälven river delta.

From Skoghall it is 7 kilometres (4.3 mi) to the city of Karlstad. Karlstad Municipality is the only municipality with bridge connections to Hammarö.

=== Localities ===
- Skoghall
- Vidöåsen

While the vast majority of Hammarö's inhabitants live in a single urban area going by the Statistics Sweden designation of Skoghall, this urban area is split in two postal areas: Skoghall (western part) and Hammarö (eastern part). The name Skoghall is seldom used for the urban area in its entirety.

=== _{Skoghall city center} ===
Skoghall City Center is a commercial and recreational hub located in Skoghall, a suburban district situated within the municipality of Hammarö in Värmland County, Sweden. Renowned for its blend of retail outlets and leisure amenities, Skoghall City Center serves as a focal point for both locals and visitors alike.

== Economy ==
100 years ago the largest employers were all in the fishing sectors. Today, the company Stora Enso Skoghall, manufacturing cardboard boxes, has 950 employees. Second is Akzo Nobel Base Chemicals with 150, manufacturing chemical products.

== Demographics ==
This is a demographic table based on Hammarö Municipality's electoral districts in the 2022 Swedish general election sourced from SVT's election platform, in turn taken from SCB official statistics.

In total there were 16,749 residents, including 12,337 Swedish citizens of voting age. 51.8% voted for the left coalition and 47.2% for the right coalition. Indicators are in percentage points except population totals and income.

Location	Residents	Citizen adults	Left vote	Right vote	Employed	Swedish parents	Foreign heritage	Income SEK	Degree
Location			%	%					
Gunnarskär	1,843	1,311	55.3	44.1	90	95	5	31,813	56
Haga	1,918	1,591	56.3	42.6	81	89	11	24,758	39
Hallersrud	1,560	1,086	48.2	51.5	90	95	5	34,053	60
Hammar	1,860	1,320	52.1	47.4	90	94	6	32,332	67
Klöverud	2,033	1,486	53.0	46.4	89	93	7	32,554	60
Lövnäs	2,089	1,464	46.8	52.4	91	93	7	36,065	70
Mörmon	1,785	1,423	59.5	38.2	76	85	15	22,809	37
Skoghall	1,771	1,389	56.4	42.0	72	83	17	22,278	37
Ö Bärstad-Rud	1,890	1,267	40.7	58.4	90	92	8	33,975	66
Source: SVT

== Elections ==
=== Riksdag ===
These are the local results of the Riksdag elections since the 1972 municipality reform. The results of the Sweden Democrats were not published by SCB between 1988 and 1998 at a municipal level to the party's small nationwide size at the time. "Votes" denotes valid votes, whereas "Turnout" denotes also blank and invalid votes.

Year	Turnout	Votes	V	S	MP	C	L	KD	M	SD	ND
1973	93.8	7,877	5.5	60.1	0.0	17.5	7.6	0.3	8.4	0.0	
1976	94.0	7,400	4.4	57.4	0.0	16.9	9.2	0.3	11.2	0.0	
1979	93.8	7,840	5.2	56.7	0.0	11.3	8.2	0.2	17.2	0.0	
1982	94.5	8,593	5.1	58.0	1.4	8.6	5.7	1.0	21.1	0.0	
1985	93.2	8,579	5.6	55.7	1.6	4.9	13.1	0.0	18.9	0.0	
1988	89.8	8,596	6.1	55.0	4.3	6.7	11.3	0.9	15.6	0.0	
1991	89.9	8,625	4.2	47.5	2.8	4.8	9.4	4.6	19.8	0.0	6.3
1994	89.9	9,106	6.7	53.3	3.8	3.7	6.2	2.5	20.5	0.0	0.9
1998	85.2	8,643	13.7	43.7	4.1	2.0	3.8	10.0	21.4	0.0	
2002	83.8	8,671	8.2	46.4	3.6	3.9	13.3	7.6	14.1	1.3	
2006	85.9	9,078	5.7	41.9	4.0	5.6	7.0	6.6	25.0	2.3	
2010	88.9	9,898	5.0	35.1	5.8	4.5	7.4	5.6	31.5	3.9	
2014	90.0	10,274	4.6	37.7	6.1	5.1	5.3	4.8	25.8	8.3	
2018	91.0	10,916	5.7	34.1	4.1	8.8	6.6	6.6	20.0	13.2	

Blocs

This lists the relative strength of the socialist and centre-right blocs since 1973, but parties not elected to the Riksdag are inserted as "other", including the Sweden Democrats results from 1988 to 2006, but also the Christian Democrats pre-1991 and the Greens in 1982, 1985 and 1991. The sources are identical to the table above. The coalition or government mandate marked in bold formed the government after the election. New Democracy got elected in 1991 but are still listed as "other" due to the short lifespan of the party. "Elected" is the total number of percentage points from the municipality that went to parties who were elected to the Riksdag.

Year	Turnout	Votes	Left	Right	SD	Other	Elected
1973	93.8	7,877	**65.6**	33.5	0.0	0.9	99.1
1976	94.0	7,400	61.8	**37.3**	0.0	0.9	99.1
1979	93.8	7,840	62.9	**36.7**	0.0	0.4	99.6
1982	94.5	8,593	**63.1**	35.4	0.0	1.5	98.5
1985	93.2	8,579	**61.3**	36.9	0.0	1.8	98.2
1988	89.8	8,596	**65.4**	33.6	0.0	1.0	99.0
1991	89.9	8,625	51.7	**38.6**	0.0	9.7	96.6
1994	89.9	9,106	**63.8**	32.9	0.0	3.3	96.7
1998	85.2	8,643	**61.5**	37.2	0.0	1.3	98.7
2002	83.8	8,671	**58.2**	38.9	0.0	2.9	97.1
2006	85.9	9,078	51.6	**44.2**	0.0	4.2	95.8
2010	88.9	9,898	45.9	**49.0**	3.9	1.2	98.8
2014	90.0	10,274	**48.4**	41.0	8.3	2.3	97.7

== Sister cities ==
- Enebakk, Norway
- Poel, Germany
- Małkinia Górna, Poland
