= Results of the 1994 Swedish general election =

Sweden held a general election on 18 September 1994. As of the 2022 election, this was the final time in which the Social Democrats won more than 45% of the overall vote, marking a steady decline thereafter. The Green Party replaced the New Democracy party in the Riksdag, with the seven elected parties being represented in parliament into the 2020s after the Christian Democrats narrowly beat the parliamentary 4% threshold by a mere 3,752 votes.

== National results ==
Party	Votes	%	Seats			
Party	Votes	%	Con.	Lev.	Tot.	+/–
Swedish Social Democratic Party	2,513,905	45.25	158	3	161	+23
Moderate Party	1,243,253	22.38	80	0	80	0
Centre Party	425,153	7.65	24	3	27	–4
Liberal People's Party	399,556	7.19	22	4	26	–7
Left Party	342,988	6.17	14	8	22	+6
Green Party	279,042	5.02	6	12	18	+18
Christian Democratic Society Party	225,974	4.07	6	9	15	–11
New Democracy	68,663	1.24	0	0	0	–25
Other parties	57,006	1.03	0	0	0	0
Total	5,555,540	100.00	310	39	349	0
Valid votes	5,555,540	98.50				
Invalid/blank votes	84,853	1.50				
Total votes	5,640,393	100.00				
Registered voters/turnout	6,496,120	86.83				
Source: Nohlen & Stöver

== Regional results ==
=== Percentage share ===
Location	Turnout	Share	Votes	S	M	C	FP	V	MP	KDS	NyD	Other	Left	Right
Götaland	87.1	48.2	2,680,150	44.2	23.1	8.7	6.6	5.3	4.8	4.7	1.4	1.2	54.4	43.0
Svealand	86.6	37.6	2,086,340	42.9	25.4	5.8	8.4	6.6	5.3	3.5	1.2	0.9	54.7	43.1
Norrland	86.5	14.2	789,050	54.9	12.1	9.0	5.9	8.2	5.0	3.5	0.6	0.7	68.1	30.5
Total	86.8	100.0	5,555,540	45.3	22.4	7.7	7.2	6.2	5.0	4.1	1.2	1.0	56.4	41.3
Source: SCB

=== By votes ===
Location	Turnout	Share	Votes	S	M	C	FP	V	MP	KDS	NyD	Other	Left	Right
Götaland	87.1	48.2	2,680,150	1,185,590	618,536	231,938	177,802	141,797	129,683	124,921	38,151	31,732	1,457,070	1,153,197
Svealand	86.6	37.6	2,086,340	895,318	529,518	121,877	174,836	136,834	109,653	73,479	25,418	19,407	1,141,805	899,710
Norrland	86.5	14.2	789,050	432,997	95,199	71,338	46,918	64,357	39,706	27,574	5,094	5,867	537,060	241,029
Total	86.8	100.0	5,555,540	2,513,905	1,243,253	425,153	399,556	342,988	279,042	225,974	68,663	57,006	3,135,935	2,293,936
Source: SCB

== Constituency results ==
=== Percentage share ===
Constituency	Land	Turnout	Share	Votes	S	M	C	FP	V	MP	KDS	NyD	Other	Left	Right	Margin
Constituency		%	%		%	%	%	%	%	%	%	%	%	%	%	
Blekinge	G	87.6	1.8	100,235	52.9	18.5	7.6	5.2	6.5	4.4	3.3	1.1	0.6	63.8	34.6	29,270
Bohuslän	G	87.8	3.6	201,744	42.7	22.2	7.3	9.0	5.9	5.6	5.1	1.5	0.8	54.1	43.5	21,413
Gothenburg	G	85.3	4.9	271,830	40.2	25.5	2.9	9.6	8.8	6.0	4.3	1.6	1.1	54.9	42.4	33,987
Gotland	G	86.1	0.7	37,009	43.5	18.0	17.9	4.5	5.2	6.7	2.5	1.3	0.4	55.4	42.9	4,608
Gävleborg	N	85.3	3.4	186,959	53.6	13.2	9.1	5.8	7.9	5.5	3.2	1.1	0.6	67.0	31.3	66,736
Halland	G	88.0	3.1	170,741	40.4	25.4	12.6	6.7	4.2	4.7	3.7	1.5	0.8	49.3	48.4	1,436
Jämtland	N	85.6	1.6	88,488	51.3	13.0	15.0	4.5	6.8	5.8	2.4	0.5	0.7	63.9	34.8	25,759
Jönköping	G	88.3	3.6	200,764	41.8	19.9	10.8	6.2	4.4	4.2	10.7	1.0	1.0	50.3	47.6	5,395
Kalmar	G	87.2	2.9	158,424	47.6	19.0	13.0	4.4	5.6	4.3	4.3	1.3	0.6	57.5	40.6	26,682
Kopparberg	S	85.2	3.3	184,056	49.5	16.2	10.1	5.8	7.0	6.0	3.7	1.0	0.8	62.4	35.8	48,973
Kristianstad	G	85.2	3.3	185,380	45.2	25.1	9.7	5.2	3.5	4.1	4.1	1.5	1.5	52.8	44.1	16,114
Kronoberg	G	87.6	2.1	115,735	42.6	21.5	13.3	5.4	5.8	4.8	4.8	0.9	0.9	53.2	45.0	9,476
Malmö	G	84.5	2.6	146,509	48.8	27.6	2.0	5.7	4.4	3.7	2.5	2.0	3.3	56.9	37.8	27,961
Malmöhus N	G	85.8	2.9	160,415	46.8	26.8	6.8	5.6	3.5	4.0	2.8	1.5	2.3	54.3	42.0	19,705
Malmöhus S	G	89.2	3.6	200,809	42.5	29.8	6.0	7.7	3.4	4.3	2.7	1.7	1.9	50.3	46.1	8,348
Norrbotten	N	87.4	3.1	174,045	60.6	10.3	5.4	4.7	11.4	3.5	2.6	0.3	1.1	75.5	23.1	91,328
Skaraborg	G	87.2	3.2	179,026	42.4	20.6	12.4	5.9	5.5	5.2	5.8	1.6	0.6	53.1	44.7	15,186
Stockholm	S	85.4	7.9	438,432	34.8	32.2	3.2	10.2	8.4	5.8	3.0	1.3	1.1	49.1	48.6	2,097
Stockholm County	S	87.3	10.7	594,998	37.6	32.5	4.2	9.4	5.4	5.0	3.4	1.4	0.9	48.1	49.6	8,618
Södermanland	S	87.4	3.0	164,273	51.7	18.9	6.7	6.8	5.4	5.0	3.4	0.9	1.2	62.1	35.8	43,328
Uppsala	S	87.4	3.2	176,494	42.8	22.4	7.9	9.0	5.9	6.1	3.8	1.2	0.9	54.8	43.0	20,849
Värmland	S	86.6	3.3	185,145	49.7	18.6	9.4	6.2	6.8	4.4	3.4	1.0	0.6	60.9	37.5	43,373
Västerbotten	N	87.0	3.0	166,348	52.0	11.1	9.4	8.1	7.3	5.8	5.0	0.5	0.7	65.2	33.6	52,450
Västernorrland	N	87.1	3.1	173,210	55.0	13.0	9.2	6.0	6.7	4.8	3.9	0.7	0.7	66.6	32.1	59,758
Västmanland	S	86.5	3.0	164,306	51.2	19.0	6.0	7.2	6.3	4.7	3.3	1.2	1.0	62.2	35.6	43,785
Älvsborg N	G	87.8	3.0	167,155	45.2	18.8	9.9	7.1	6.1	5.7	5.2	1.2	0.7	57.1	41.0	26,804
Älvsborg S	G	88.2	2.1	117,918	45.6	21.2	10.8	6.1	5.1	5.1	4.6	1.1	0.4	55.8	42.7	15,358
Örebro	S	87.2	3.2	178,636	50.8	16.3	6.9	7.4	7.1	4.6	5.0	1.2	0.8	62.5	35.5	48,308
Östergötland	G	87.7	4.8	266,456	46.1	21.7	7.7	6.7	5.5	5.1	4.8	1.4	1.1	56.6	40.8	42,130
Total		86.8	100.0	5,555,540	45.3	22.4	7.7	7.2	6.2	5.0	4.1	1.2	1.0	56.4	41.3	841,999
Source: SCB

=== By votes ===
Constituency	Land	Turnout	Share	Votes	S	M	C	FP	V	MP	KDS	NyD	Other	Left	Right	Margin
Constituency		%	%													
Blekinge	G	87.6	1.8	100,235	53,000	18,573	7,629	5,178	6,505	4,430	3,285	1,061	574	63,935	34,665	29,270
Bohuslän	G	87.8	3.6	201,744	86,079	44,807	14,688	18,077	11,904	11,257	10,255	3,103	1,574	109,240	87,827	21,413
Gothenburg	G	85.3	4.9	271,830	109,186	69,283	7,994	26,137	23,817	16,202	11,804	4,283	3,124	149,205	115,218	33,987
Gotland	G	86.1	0.7	37,009	16,089	6,646	6,639	1,671	1,926	2,486	937	471	144	20,501	15,893	4,608
Gävleborg	N	85.3	3.4	186,959	100,293	24,688	17,019	10,906	14,681	10,296	5,921	2,077	1,078	125,270	58,534	66,736
Halland	G	88.0	3.1	170,741	68,924	43,405	21,595	11,371	7,255	7,971	6,343	2,538	1,339	84,150	82,714	1,436
Jämtland	N	85.6	1.6	88,488	45,434	11,524	13,270	3,940	6,009	5,137	2,087	474	613	56,580	30,821	25,759
Jönköping	G	88.3	3.6	200,764	83,870	39,947	21,637	12,481	8,770	8,369	21,549	2,045	2,096	101,009	95,614	5,395
Kalmar	G	87.2	2.9	158,424	75,379	30,044	20,559	6,910	8,805	6,891	6,880	2,001	955	91,075	64,393	26,682
Kopparberg	S	85.2	3.3	184,056	91,037	29,757	18,564	10,710	12,813	11,022	6,868	1,806	1,479	114,872	65,899	48,973
Kristianstad	G	85.2	3.3	185,380	83,839	46,581	18,028	9,632	6,474	7,622	7,580	2,838	2,786	97,935	81,821	16,114
Kronoberg	G	87.6	2.1	115,735	49,337	24,906	15,409	6,246	6,689	5,533	5,522	1,025	1,068	61,559	52,083	9,476
Malmö	G	84.5	2.6	146,509	71,442	40,454	2,933	8,350	6,513	5,364	3,621	2,940	4,892	83,319	55,358	27,961
Malmöhus N	G	85.8	2.9	160,415	75,002	43,002	10,887	8,904	5,672	6,365	4,541	2,391	3,651	87,039	67,334	19,705
Malmöhus S	G	89.2	3.6	200,809	85,415	59,779	11,975	15,480	6,801	8,718	5,352	3,490	3,799	100,934	92,586	8,348
Norrbotten	N	87.4	3.1	174,045	105,436	18,008	9,447	8,195	19,868	6,165	4,491	602	1,833	131,469	40,141	91,328
Skaraborg	G	87.2	3.2	179,026	75,939	36,963	22,111	10,512	9,854	9,353	10,374	2,817	1,103	95,146	79,960	15,186
Stockholm	S	85.4	7.9	438,432	152,722	140,982	13,996	44,707	36,768	25,595	13,303	5,641	4,718	215,085	212,988	2,097
Stockholm County	S	87.3	10.7	594,998	223,902	193,581	24,979	55,933	32,360	30,032	20,419	8,299	5,493	286,294	294,912	8,618
Södermanland	S	87.4	3.0	164,273	84,976	31,061	10,940	11,177	8,829	8,280	5,579	1,518	1,913	102,085	58,757	43,328
Uppsala	S	87.4	3.2	176,494	75,620	39,479	13,895	15,803	10,333	10,816	6,743	2,150	1,655	96,769	75,920	20,849
Värmland	S	86.6	3.3	185,145	92,052	34,455	17,319	11,423	12,658	8,071	6,211	1,845	1,111	112,781	69,408	43,373
Västerbotten	N	87.0	3.0	166,348	86,568	18,444	15,689	13,445	12,133	9,716	8,389	750	1,214	108,417	55,967	52,450
Västernorrland	N	87.1	3.1	173,210	95,266	22,535	15,913	10,432	11,666	8,392	6,686	1,191	1,129	115,324	55,566	59,758
Västmanland	S	86.5	3.0	164,306	84,194	31,160	9,938	11,837	10,361	7,659	5,494	1,972	1,691	102,214	58,429	43,785
Älvsborg N	G	87.8	3.0	167,155	75,632	31,391	16,627	11,835	10,178	9,562	8,715	2,078	1,137	95,372	68,568	26,804
Älvsborg S	G	88.2	2.1	117,918	53,754	25,002	12,763	7,249	5,961	6,029	5,372	1,277	511	65,744	50,386	15,358
Örebro	S	87.2	3.2	178,636	90,815	29,043	12,246	13,246	12,712	8,178	8,862	2,187	1,347	111,705	63,397	48,308
Östergötland	G	87.7	4.8	266,456	122,703	57,753	20,464	17,769	14,673	13,531	12,791	3,793	2,979	150,907	108,777	42,130
Total		86.8	100.0	5,555,540	2,513,905	1,243,253	425,153	399,556	342,988	279,042	225,974	68,663	57,006	3,135,935	2,293,936	841,999
Source: SCB

== Municipal summary ==
Location	County	Turnout	Votes	S	M	C	FP	V	MP	KDS	NyD	Other	Left	Right
Ale	Älvsborg	88.8	15,695	49.9	17.2	7.6	6.2	7.8	4.8	4.1	1.6	0.8	62.5	35.1
Alingsås	Älvsborg	89.3	22,425	40.5	20.2	7.8	8.8	6.3	6.9	7.6	1.3	0.6	53.7	44.4
Alvesta	Kronoberg	88.1	12,465	42.2	20.2	17.0	4.0	5.5	4.1	4.7	1.4	1.0	51.8	45.8
Aneby	Jönköping	89.0	4,490	35.2	17.0	16.9	5.1	2.8	4.2	16.8	0.9	1.1	42.2	55.8
Arboga	Västmanland	87.0	9,510	50.9	17.5	7.1	6.6	6.7	5.7	3.5	1.0	1.1	63.3	34.6
Arjeplog	Norrbotten	83.6	2,381	55.9	8.7	8.3	3.9	13.8	5.0	2.9	0.2	1.4	74.7	23.7
Arvidsjaur	Norrbotten	87.0	5,390	62.0	8.8	6.5	3.9	12.1	2.8	2.7	0.3	0.9	76.8	22.0
Arvika	Värmland	83.1	16,819	47.4	16.9	10.0	6.4	8.2	5.9	3.5	1.0	0.6	61.5	36.9
Askersund	Örebro	87.3	7,957	52.4	14.9	11.0	5.5	5.6	3.9	5.4	0.8	0.5	61.9	36.8
Avesta	Kopparberg	86.1	15,731	56.5	11.9	10.1	4.6	7.9	4.6	3.0	0.7	0.7	68.9	29.7
Bengtsfors	Älvsborg	84.3	7,243	48.2	16.8	13.9	5.6	4.7	4.3	5.4	0.9	0.3	57.2	41.7
Berg	Jämtland	83.1	5,404	46.8	10.8	25.5	2.7	5.6	4.7	2.2	0.5	1.1	57.1	41.3
Bjurholm	Västerbotten	87.5	1,978	39.1	15.3	19.0	12.3	2.9	3.7	7.2	0.4	0.1	45.8	53.7
Bjuv	Malmöhus	86.7	8,615	60.9	19.0	5.8	3.8	3.4	2.6	1.9	1.3	1.3	66.9	30.5
Boden	Norrbotten	89.1	20,391	59.7	13.6	5.3	4.5	9.2	3.7	2.8	0.4	0.8	72.5	26.3
Bollebygd	Älvsborg	90.2	5,145	43.2	23.3	10.6	5.2	4.9	5.4	5.4	1.2	0.6	53.6	44.6
Bollnäs	Gävleborg	84.7	18,152	50.8	12.3	12.4	5.5	7.8	6.2	3.3	0.7	1.0	64.9	33.5
Borgholm	Kalmar	85.7	7,653	33.3	22.6	24.0	3.7	3.6	5.4	5.3	1.3	0.9	42.3	55.6
Borlänge	Kopparberg	86.2	30,506	55.5	14.5	6.3	5.6	7.5	5.7	3.0	1.0	0.9	68.7	29.4
Borås	Älvsborg	87.8	61,350	48.3	22.1	6.6	6.7	5.7	4.9	4.1	1.1	0.4	58.8	39.6
Botkyrka	Stockholm	83.6	34,056	48.5	23.4	2.8	7.6	6.7	5.1	3.1	1.8	1.1	60.2	36.9
Boxholm	Östergötland	89.6	3,758	54.2	11.0	13.1	3.7	6.7	4.7	5.1	0.9	0.6	65.6	32.9
Bromölla	Kristianstad	88.0	8,034	64.0	11.8	4.7	3.9	6.9	4.3	2.6	1.2	0.7	75.2	23.0
Bräcke	Jämtland	85.1	5,468	59.6	9.9	14.6	2.6	6.7	4.7	1.1	0.3	0.5	70.9	28.3
Burlöv	Malmöhus	89.3	9,001	57.8	22.4	2.8	5.2	3.1	2.9	1.8	1.9	2.2	63.8	32.2
Båstad	Kristianstad	86.1	9,167	22.8	40.1	17.0	6.7	1.6	4.5	4.5	2.2	0.7	28.8	68.3
Dals-Ed	Älvsborg	83.2	3,203	36.3	17.0	20.2	4.8	3.7	7.7	8.9	0.7	0.7	47.7	50.9
Danderyd	Stockholm	92.1	18,924	14.2	58.0	3.4	12.0	1.8	3.2	5.9	0.9	0.5	19.2	79.4
Degerfors	Örebro	89.3	7,608	63.8	8.8	5.9	4.4	9.9	3.2	2.8	1.0	0.4	76.8	21.8
Dorotea	Västerbotten	85.4	2,374	62.5	7.6	11.8	6.2	5.7	3.7	1.8	0.2	0.6	71.8	27.4
Eda	Värmland	84.4	5,321	51.8	14.6	14.2	3.8	6.8	4.1	3.2	1.0	0.5	62.7	35.8
Ekerö	Stockholm	90.0	12,605	28.4	37.6	7.2	10.3	4.3	6.3	3.5	1.0	1.4	39.0	58.5
Eksjö	Jönköping	87.3	11,717	37.6	21.0	15.8	5.6	3.6	5.3	9.2	0.9	1.1	46.5	51.5
Emmaboda	Kalmar	87.6	6,902	50.6	15.0	16.9	3.5	4.3	4.7	3.7	1.0	0.4	59.5	39.1
Enköping	Uppsala	84.4	22,116	44.6	22.8	12.5	6.0	3.9	4.8	3.3	1.5	0.6	53.3	44.5
Eskilstuna	Södermanland	85.9	55,238	54.2	17.8	4.8	7.1	5.6	4.5	3.2	1.3	1.5	64.3	32.9
Eslöv	Malmöhus	85.4	18,014	50.2	22.8	10.9	3.8	3.1	3.4	2.2	2.0	1.5	56.8	39.7
Essunga	Skaraborg	86.1	3,813	32.4	24.4	23.0	5.3	3.6	4.5	4.4	2.1	0.3	40.5	57.1
Fagersta	Västmanland	86.1	8,671	61.0	14.3	4.0	5.4	7.2	3.6	2.3	1.1	1.3	71.7	25.9
Falkenberg	Halland	88.2	24,715	40.3	21.1	18.7	4.8	3.9	5.0	3.7	1.4	1.1	49.2	48.3
Falköping	Skaraborg	87.0	20,877	38.7	21.7	15.3	4.8	5.3	5.8	6.6	1.2	0.5	49.8	48.5
Falun	Kopparberg	85.5	34,446	41.5	21.5	9.6	8.5	6.0	7.0	4.2	0.9	0.9	54.4	43.8
Filipstad	Värmland	85.3	8,504	63.8	12.3	5.0	4.2	8.4	2.9	1.7	1.1	0.6	75.1	23.2
Finspång	Östergötland	89.3	15,081	55.1	14.1	6.9	4.9	7.4	4.3	5.2	1.2	0.9	66.8	31.1
Flen	Södermanland	87.7	10,924	52.1	17.1	9.2	5.1	6.1	5.0	3.6	0.7	1.1	63.2	34.9
Forshaga	Värmland	88.7	7,892	55.9	14.9	8.0	5.8	6.2	4.0	3.0	1.4	0.7	66.1	31.8
Färgelanda	Älvsborg	86.9	4,672	42.9	15.7	22.0	5.7	4.2	4.7	3.5	1.1	0.3	51.7	46.8
Gagnef	Kopparberg	87.0	6,529	45.9	14.3	15.2	4.7	5.4	7.5	5.1	1.2	0.8	58.8	39.3
Gislaved	Jönköping	88.2	17,982	43.4	20.9	13.9	6.4	2.9	4.4	6.5	0.8	0.8	50.7	47.7
Gnesta	Södermanland	86.7	5,892	42.2	19.6	13.3	6.0	5.5	7.7	3.6	0.9	1.2	55.5	42.5
Gnosjö	Jönköping	89.4	5,889	35.6	22.7	11.2	5.5	2.9	3.2	16.2	1.1	1.5	41.7	55.6
Gothenburg	Gothenburg	85.3	271,830	40.2	25.5	2.9	9.6	8.8	6.0	4.3	1.6	1.1	54.9	42.4
Gotland	Gotland	86.1	37,009	43.5	18.0	17.9	4.5	5.2	6.7	2.5	1.3	0.4	55.4	42.9
Grums	Värmland	86.7	6,569	59.4	12.8	9.1	3.6	6.5	4.0	2.6	1.5	0.6	69.9	28.0
Grästorp	Skaraborg	87.0	3,948	33.4	26.0	19.5	4.4	4.4	5.6	4.4	1.8	0.4	43.4	54.4
Gullspång	Skaraborg	86.1	4,057	47.1	17.3	12.4	3.7	6.2	5.5	5.4	1.3	0.9	58.9	38.8
Gällivare	Norrbotten	83.4	14,213	60.3	9.9	2.5	3.0	17.4	3.3	1.6	0.4	1.6	81.0	17.0
Gävle	Gävleborg	85.9	58,260	54.0	16.5	4.4	8.1	6.8	5.3	2.8	1.4	0.6	66.1	31.9
Götene	Skaraborg	88.9	8,847	42.3	18.0	13.0	6.3	5.5	5.5	6.9	2.0	0.5	53.4	44.1
Habo	Skaraborg	89.5	5,819	36.7	22.3	10.3	6.2	3.9	4.7	12.9	1.7	1.3	45.5	51.7
Hagfors	Värmland	88.3	10,782	64.0	9.6	7.7	2.9	10.4	2.9	1.8	0.4	0.3	77.2	22.1
Hallsberg	Örebro	88.4	10,820	55.3	12.3	8.6	5.9	7.1	3.9	5.1	1.0	0.8	66.3	31.9
Hallstahammar	Västmanland	86.5	9,938	61.3	12.6	4.3	5.1	8.5	3.3	2.3	1.3	1.4	73.0	24.3
Halmstad	Halland	87.4	53,603	46.2	24.8	7.5	6.7	4.6	4.6	3.2	1.5	0.9	55.4	42.2
Hammarö	Värmland	89.9	9,106	53.3	20.5	3.7	8.2	6.7	3.8	2.5	0.9	0.4	63.8	34.9
Haninge	Stockholm	86.0	36,264	45.2	25.1	3.9	8.0	6.7	5.2	2.6	2.2	1.1	57.1	39.6
Haparanda	Norrbotten	79.4	5,112	59.3	12.8	11.2	3.3	6.8	2.6	2.3	0.4	1.4	68.7	29.5
Heby	Västmanland	86.1	8,653	46.1	14.6	18.6	4.2	5.3	5.4	4.6	1.0	0.3	56.8	42.0
Hedemora	Kopparberg	86.0	10,706	49.3	14.6	12.3	4.8	5.4	5.6	3.7	0.9	1.3	62.7	35.4
Helsingborg	Malmöhus	84.9	70,725	45.2	28.8	4.2	6.6	4.1	4.2	2.8	1.1	3.0	53.5	42.4
Herrljunga	Älvsborg	89.3	6,302	35.1	19.0	19.8	6.2	4.6	5.9	7.9	1.2	0.4	45.6	52.8
Hjo	Skaraborg	86.2	5,877	41.1	22.5	10.4	6.6	4.7	5.4	7.2	1.3	0.8	51.2	46.8
Hofors	Gävleborg	86.0	7,354	63.2	10.2	5.4	3.7	11.2	3.7	1.5	0.7	0.5	78.1	20.8
Huddinge	Stockholm	86.6	42,717	41.5	29.1	3.2	8.9	6.5	5.0	2.9	2.0	1.1	52.9	44.0
Hudiksvall	Gävleborg	83.6	24,323	47.9	11.8	13.7	4.3	9.3	7.5	3.6	1.3	0.6	64.7	33.4
Hultsfred	Kalmar	86.9	10,764	49.2	14.7	16.6	3.1	6.6	2.7	5.6	1.1	0.5	58.5	39.9
Hylte	Halland	86.3	6,809	45.9	16.1	20.7	5.2	2.8	3.9	3.5	1.3	0.6	52.6	45.6
Håbo	Uppsala	87.7	9,801	39.9	34.1	4.7	6.7	4.4	4.1	2.8	1.8	1.4	48.5	48.4
Hällefors	Örebro	85.2	5,759	64.5	9.9	5.4	4.0	9.0	4.4	1.9	0.6	0.3	78.0	21.2
Härjedalen	Jämtland	82.9	8,024	58.1	11.8	10.9	3.9	7.2	5.0	1.7	0.7	0.8	70.3	28.3
Härnösand	Västernorrland	86.8	18,355	45.0	19.4	10.9	6.2	6.5	6.6	3.8	0.9	0.7	58.1	40.3
Härryda	Bohus	89.5	17,513	39.9	25.2	5.7	10.5	5.9	6.2	4.3	1.7	0.5	52.1	45.8
Hässleholm	Kristianstad	84.7	31,535	43.9	22.4	11.7	5.2	3.6	4.8	5.4	1.5	1.5	52.3	44.7
Höganäs	Malmöhus	88.3	15,083	38.7	33.8	6.3	7.4	3.0	4.6	4.2	1.3	0.8	46.3	51.6
Högsby	Kalmar	86.4	4,473	49.0	15.5	16.1	2.6	6.0	3.7	5.5	0.9	0.9	58.6	39.6
Hörby	Malmöhus	84.5	8,598	34.2	24.4	17.5	4.4	2.2	4.4	5.3	2.5	5.1	40.8	51.7
Höör	Malmöhus	85.5	8,254	38.2	27.7	12.0	5.1	3.1	5.7	4.1	1.5	2.7	46.9	48.9
Jokkmokk	Norrbotten	84.5	4,235	64.0	7.9	3.3	4.0	11.5	6.0	1.5	0.4	1.4	81.5	16.7
Järfälla	Stockholm	89.1	35,461	39.8	30.7	3.1	10.0	5.6	4.8	3.8	1.3	1.0	50.2	47.5
Jönköping	Jönköping	88.3	73,866	43.3	20.7	6.7	7.3	5.1	4.1	10.7	1.1	1.1	52.4	45.4
Kalix	Norrbotten	88.6	12,721	66.3	8.6	6.9	4.0	8.6	2.8	1.6	0.4	0.9	77.7	21.0
Kalmar	Kalmar	87.7	37,996	46.7	23.4	7.8	5.9	5.4	4.9	3.7	1.3	0.8	57.0	40.9
Karlsborg	Skaraborg	88.7	5,173	46.8	19.7	11.5	5.1	4.7	5.2	4.3	2.1	0.4	56.8	40.7
Karlshamn	Blekinge	88.0	21,163	56.5	15.6	6.0	4.9	7.5	5.0	3.0	0.9	0.5	69.1	29.5
Karlskoga	Örebro	86.3	21,815	56.5	18.3	3.7	5.8	7.4	3.4	2.9	1.6	0.4	67.2	30.7
Karlskrona	Blekinge	88.2	40,021	49.1	20.7	8.0	5.9	6.3	4.5	3.7	1.2	0.6	59.9	38.4
Karlstad	Värmland	88.0	52,738	44.4	24.3	6.3	8.3	6.4	4.9	3.8	1.1	0.6	55.7	42.6
Katrineholm	Södermanland	88.1	21,455	54.2	16.5	7.6	6.4	4.7	5.9	3.3	0.5	0.8	64.9	33.8
Kil	Värmland	87.5	7,780	45.2	21.1	10.5	6.8	5.6	5.0	3.9	1.0	0.9	55.8	42.3
Kinda	Östergötland	86.6	6,742	39.5	17.3	19.7	4.5	3.9	5.7	7.7	1.1	0.5	49.0	49.3
Kiruna	Norrbotten	84.5	16,299	58.6	9.2	2.0	3.6	19.2	3.6	2.0	0.5	1.4	81.4	16.8
Klippan	Kristianstad	83.2	9,875	46.0	26.5	10.3	4.0	3.0	3.4	3.3	1.9	1.4	52.5	44.2
Kramfors	Västernorrland	87.9	16,233	57.3	10.6	13.1	2.9	7.8	4.2	3.5	0.3	0.3	69.3	30.2
Kristianstad	Kristianstad	86.1	47,261	48.8	24.4	6.8	6.3	3.5	4.0	3.3	1.2	1.8	56.2	40.7
Kristinehamn	Värmland	87.2	17,156	52.5	17.5	6.8	7.0	7.3	4.3	3.2	1.0	0.5	64.1	34.4
Krokom	Jönköping	86.6	9,280	48.8	11.8	19.0	3.6	6.1	6.4	2.9	0.5	0.9	61.4	37.2
Kumla	Örebro	87.8	12,127	50.9	14.5	8.0	6.8	7.3	4.0	6.5	1.4	0.7	62.1	35.8
Kungsbacka	Halland	89.8	38,373	30.9	35.4	9.0	9.6	3.6	4.7	4.4	1.8	0.4	39.3	58.5
Kungsör	Västmanland	87.3	5,377	49.0	18.2	8.9	6.0	7.2	5.4	2.8	1.4	1.1	61.6	35.9
Kungälv	Bohus	90.0	23,313	42.7	22.6	8.6	8.0	6.1	5.3	4.9	1.3	0.6	54.0	44.1
Kävlinge	Malmöhus	89.9	15,284	50.6	26.7	5.5	5.8	2.3	3.2	2.0	1.5	2.3	56.2	40.1
Köping	Västmanland	86.0	16,328	54.1	15.4	7.2	5.1	8.5	3.9	3.5	0.9	1.5	66.5	31.1
Laholm	Halland	85.9	14,444	35.1	23.8	21.3	4.4	3.5	5.3	3.6	1.8	1.0	44.0	53.2
Landskrona	Malmöhus	86.9	23,145	56.3	24.5	3.4	4.5	3.6	3.1	1.6	2.0	0.9	63.0	34.1
Laxå	Örebro	86.2	4,565	58.0	11.2	7.8	5.8	5.8	4.1	6.0	0.5	0.8	67.9	30.8
Lekeberg	Örebro	87.2	4,517	39.3	16.8	18.1	5.3	5.0	5.3	8.3	1.4	0.5	49.7	48.5
Leksand	Kopparberg	86.3	9,994	38.6	20.2	13.0	5.9	5.4	7.6	7.7	0.9	0.6	51.6	46.8
Lerum	Älvsborg	90.8	21,502	36.9	27.0	5.4	10.3	5.8	6.9	5.5	1.6	0.5	49.6	48.2
Lessebo	Kronoberg	89.2	5,760	56.5	14.7	9.0	3.9	7.8	4.6	2.1	0.8	0.7	68.9	29.7
Lidingö	Stockholm	90.5	25,343	19.9	50.2	4.3	12.5	2.9	3.9	4.7	0.9	0.6	26.8	71.7
Lidköping	Skaraborg	87.8	24,014	45.9	18.5	10.7	6.5	7.1	5.1	4.7	1.2	0.4	58.1	40.3
Lilla Edet	Älvsborg	86.9	7,808	52.1	13.4	11.2	4.1	8.5	4.6	3.3	1.3	1.4	65.2	32.1
Lindesberg	Örebro	86.9	16,006	50.4	15.0	11.4	5.6	7.0	5.1	4.3	0.7	0.5	62.5	36.3
Linköping	Östergötland	88.7	85,519	40.3	24.7	6.5	9.7	5.5	5.4	5.5	1.4	1.0	51.2	46.4
Ljungby	Kronoberg	86.6	17,614	41.0	19.8	15.2	4.9	5.3	5.4	6.9	0.8	0.7	51.6	46.8
Ljusdal	Gävleborg	81.7	13,316	51.5	13.0	12.4	5.6	8.4	5.3	2.5	0.9	0.3	65.2	33.6
Ljusnarsberg	Örebro	84.7	4,102	56.3	10.8	7.9	4.1	12.3	4.3	2.2	1.5	0.6	72.9	25.0
Lomma	Malmöhus	92.4	11,858	36.8	39.2	3.6	9.1	1.6	3.2	3.3	1.8	1.3	41.6	55.3
Ludvika	Kopparberg	86.1	18,636	60.1	12.1	4.9	4.6	9.5	4.8	2.4	1.0	0.6	74.4	24.0
Luleå	Norrbotten	88.5	46,798	57.2	13.1	4.7	7.1	9.6	4.4	2.8	0.3	0.7	71.1	27.8
Lund	Malmöhus	89.7	62,002	35.3	29.4	4.9	12.5	5.8	7.0	3.0	1.0	1.1	48.0	49.9
Lycksele	Västerbotten	85.0	8,917	55.4	9.5	5.7	8.5	6.9	4.1	8.7	0.4	0.8	66.4	32.4
Lysekil	Bohus	89.0	10,083	55.0	16.1	5.1	8.5	6.1	5.1	2.5	1.2	0.5	66.2	32.2
Malmö	Malmöhus	84.5	146,509	48.8	27.6	2.0	5.7	4.4	3.7	2.5	2.0	3.3	56.9	37.8
Malung	Kopparberg	86.2	7,527	49.9	17.7	12.3	6.5	5.9	3.7	2.5	0.7	0.7	59.5	39.1
Malå	Västerbotten	85.2	2,577	57.0	8.7	6.4	6.8	12.0	3.2	4.2	0.1	1.7	72.2	26.0
Mariestad	Skaraborg	86.2	16,013	46.3	19.8	8.2	5.4	7.2	5.5	5.1	1.8	0.8	59.0	38.5
Mark	Älvsborg	89.1	21,517	48.6	17.5	13.3	4.4	5.5	4.6	4.7	0.8	0.5	58.8	39.9
Markaryd	Kronoberg	85.8	6,634	46.7	18.3	12.2	4.1	5.0	4.8	6.6	1.0	1.1	56.6	41.3
Mellerud	Älvsborg	85.3	6,641	37.2	18.7	21.1	4.5	4.0	6.9	5.2	1.8	0.6	48.0	49.6
Mjölby	Östergötland	87.4	16,912	49.8	18.2	10.3	5.7	5.5	4.2	4.6	1.1	0.6	59.6	38.8
Mora	Kopparberg	81.5	12,704	44.7	18.4	11.2	6.4	5.8	7.5	4.3	1.0	0.8	58.0	40.3
Motala	Östergötland	87.4	27,184	55.5	16.2	6.5	6.0	5.8	4.8	3.7	1.0	0.5	66.1	32.4
Mullsjö	Skaraborg	91.5	4,630	36.9	19.4	10.2	5.7	4.7	6.3	14.6	1.3	0.9	47.9	49.9
Munkedal	Bohus	85.6	6,965	44.9	16.7	15.9	4.7	5.2	6.3	4.2	1.3	0.8	56.3	41.5
Munkfors	Värmland	88.2	3,275	67.3	8.0	7.3	4.3	7.7	2.2	1.8	0.6	0.9	77.1	21.3
Mölndal	Bohus	88.1	33,947	42.2	24.0	4.6	10.9	6.5	4.9	4.5	1.5	0.9	53.6	43.9
Mönsterås	Kalmar	88.7	8,867	51.6	15.5	14.5	3.1	6.0	3.6	4.0	1.2	0.4	61.2	37.1
Mörbylånga	Kalmar	87.7	8,842	40.3	22.3	17.1	5.2	4.2	5.1	3.4	1.5	0.8	49.7	48.0
Nacka	Stockholm	88.1	40,670	31.7	37.3	3.2	11.4	5.6	5.2	3.2	1.3	1.2	42.4	55.1
Nora	Örebro	86.5	6,754	50.4	16.2	7.8	7.3	7.0	5.4	4.2	1.1	0.5	62.9	35.6
Norberg	Västmanland	87.6	4,157	56.7	12.6	6.1	4.1	12.3	4.5	2.2	0.9	0.7	73.4	25.0
Nordanstig	Gävleborg	83.3	7,052	45.7	9.2	18.1	4.4	8.1	7.7	4.8	1.4	0.6	61.6	36.4
Nordmaling	Västerbotten	86.4	5,149	51.2	12.5	14.0	6.6	4.7	3.7	6.1	0.5	0.6	59.6	39.2
Norrköping	Östergötland	85.9	76,299	47.1	24.3	4.8	5.3	5.9	5.1	3.8	1.9	1.7	58.1	38.3
Norrtälje	Stockholm	85.8	30,841	43.2	23.6	11.3	5.7	5.6	5.5	3.1	1.4	0.7	54.3	43.7
Norsjö	Västerbotten	85.7	3,355	54.1	6.6	13.2	7.0	8.8	4.0	5.2	0.2	0.7	66.9	32.1
Nybro	Kalmar	87.3	13,619	49.9	17.0	14.1	3.2	5.7	3.6	4.5	1.3	0.6	59.3	38.8
Nyköping	Södermanland	88.8	32,570	51.2	19.7	7.5	6.4	5.1	4.5	3.9	0.7	1.0	60.7	37.6
Nynäshamn	Stockholm	87.2	14,308	48.2	22.2	4.8	6.4	7.5	6.2	2.8	1.5	0.5	61.9	36.2
Nässjö	Jönköping	88.9	20,383	46.5	17.5	10.6	5.4	4.9	4.3	8.6	1.0	1.1	55.7	42.1
Ockelbo	Gävleborg	83.9	4,089	54.0	11.1	15.1	3.4	7.9	4.1	3.0	0.9	0.5	66.0	32.6
Olofström	Blekinge	85.4	9,100	58.4	13.2	6.9	4.8	6.9	4.3	3.8	0.8	0.8	69.6	28.7
Orsa	Kopparberg	82.4	4,520	43.9	14.6	12.5	4.5	8.7	8.6	5.2	1.5	0.6	61.2	36.7
Orust	Bohus	87.3	9,616	39.8	21.6	12.2	8.4	6.2	6.0	3.6	1.8	0.5	52.0	45.8
Osby	Kristianstad	86.2	8,624	51.8	17.8	10.8	4.5	3.8	4.4	5.2	1.0	0.8	59.9	38.3
Oskarshamn	Kalmar	87.7	17,875	52.6	18.5	7.3	4.7	6.1	3.7	5.7	1.2	0.2	62.4	36.2
Ovanåker	Gävleborg	87.2	8,767	45.7	10.0	19.0	5.3	4.8	5.4	8.9	0.5	0.5	55.8	43.2
Oxelösund	Södermanland	88.8	7,772	63.3	12.8	2.9	5.0	8.1	4.0	2.1	0.8	0.9	75.5	22.8
Pajala	Norrbotten	84.8	5,394	54.0	8.2	6.1	3.4	20.3	2.1	3.3	0.3	2.4	76.4	21.0
Partille	Bohus	88.3	20,004	39.7	25.9	3.6	11.0	6.7	5.2	5.4	1.7	0.6	51.7	46.0
Perstorp	Kristianstad	84.3	4,350	50.2	21.9	9.4	5.0	4.4	3.3	3.6	1.1	1.1	57.9	39.8
Piteå	Norrbotten	90.8	27,888	66.6	7.5	5.9	4.3	8.1	3.1	3.3	0.2	1.0	77.8	21.0
Ragunda	Jämtland	86.0	4,493	56.0	9.3	16.2	2.1	8.5	5.5	1.6	0.3	0.6	70.0	29.2
Robertsfors	Västerbotten	87.4	4,857	42.5	9.5	23.1	7.7	4.9	4.7	6.5	0.3	0.8	52.1	46.8
Ronneby	Blekinge	87.6	19,369	53.5	18.5	9.4	4.6	6.3	4.0	2.3	0.8	0.5	63.9	34.8
Rättvik	Kopparberg	79.7	7,014	42.3	19.9	12.6	7.0	4.9	6.8	4.2	1.8	0.6	53.9	43.7
Sala	Västmanland	86.3	14,124	43.8	18.3	14.5	6.2	4.7	6.4	4.1	1.1	1.0	54.9	43.0
Salem	Stockholm	88.4	7,482	37.3	30.5	3.7	10.3	5.5	6.2	4.0	1.2	1.2	49.1	48.6
Sandviken	Gävleborg	87.4	26,190	59.7	12.8	6.7	5.2	7.8	4.1	2.5	1.0	0.3	71.5	27.2
Sigtuna	Stockholm	85.7	18,929	42.6	29.2	5.6	7.7	4.9	4.5	3.1	1.7	0.7	52.0	45.6
Simrishamn	Kristianstad	83.4	12,902	43.2	25.7	11.4	4.6	4.0	4.1	2.8	2.1	2.1	51.3	44.5
Sjöbo	Malmöhus	84.4	10,357	39.1	24.4	14.1	3.0	2.3	3.3	2.0	1.7	10.0	44.8	43.5
Skara	Skaraborg	86.8	11,984	42.9	21.7	11.4	5.6	4.9	6.3	4.2	2.6	0.3	54.1	43.0
Skellefteå	Västerbotten	88.0	50,073	57.1	8.9	9.6	6.9	7.4	4.7	4.6	0.3	0.4	69.2	30.0
Skinnskatteberg	Västmanland	87.2	3,210	60.2	11.1	7.7	3.6	7.8	5.0	3.1	0.5	1.0	73.1	25.5
Skurup	Malmöhus	85.7	8,518	44.2	24.7	13.2	4.6	2.8	3.7	1.7	1.9	3.0	50.8	44.2
Skövde	Skaraborg	87.3	31,015	44.3	22.0	9.6	7.1	5.3	4.9	4.7	1.3	0.8	54.4	43.5
Smedjebacken	Kopparberg	87.3	8,275	60.4	11.6	8.0	3.7	8.6	4.5	1.7	1.0	0.6	73.4	25.0
Sollefteå	Västernorrland	87.5	16,402	61.1	10.6	9.3	3.3	7.1	4.8	2.8	0.5	0.4	73.0	26.0
Sollentuna	Stockholm	89.8	32,455	32.5	35.3	3.8	12.0	4.5	5.2	4.5	1.5	0.7	42.1	55.6
Solna	Stockholm	84.5	36,638	35.5	35.1	2.9	9.8	6.8	4.6	3.2	1.3	0.8	46.8	51.1
Sorsele	Västerbotten	78.6	2,102	49.6	9.9	11.6	6.1	5.9	6.1	7.5	0.9	2.2	61.7	35.2
Sotenäs	Bohus	86.7	6,441	46.3	22.2	6.6	9.8	4.2	5.5	4.1	1.0	0.3	56.0	42.8
Staffanstorp	Malmöhus	90.5	12,026	43.9	30.8	5.7	7.8	2.0	3.0	2.7	2.9	1.1	49.0	47.0
Stenungsund	Bohus	87.3	12,167	41.8	23.6	7.5	9.2	5.2	6.0	4.2	1.6	0.9	53.0	44.5
Stockholm	Stockholm	85.4	438,432	34.8	32.2	3.2	10.2	8.4	5.8	3.0	1.3	1.1	49.1	48.6
Storfors	Värmland	88.9	3,334	59.0	13.0	7.8	4.8	7.8	3.0	3.0	1.0	0.5	69.8	28.6
Storuman	Västerbotten	82.6	4,769	48.0	13.4	9.4	7.2	5.9	6.3	7.8	0.6	1.4	60.2	37.7
Strängnäs	Södermanland	87.1	17,808	43.2	26.1	6.6	9.1	4.8	4.8	3.4	1.1	0.9	52.7	45.2
Strömstad	Bohus	83.8	6,378	44.1	19.1	13.5	6.8	4.9	6.3	3.2	1.6	0.4	55.3	42.6
Strömsund	Jämtland	85.3	10,228	58.4	8.1	15.4	3.5	7.6	3.9	2.0	0.5	0.7	69.9	29.0
Sundbyberg	Stockholm	84.5	18,985	45.0	25.2	3.1	8.2	8.1	4.8	2.3	1.6	1.7	57.9	38.8
Sundsvall	Västernorrland	86.4	62,272	53.4	14.9	6.6	7.9	7.2	5.2	3.1	0.9	0.8	65.7	32.5
Sunne	Värmland	84.7	8,960	38.4	21.7	20.1	4.9	4.1	4.8	4.1	1.0	0.8	47.4	50.8
Surahammar	Västmanland	87.6	6,738	62.7	10.9	3.2	5.1	9.4	4.1	2.2	1.4	1.2	76.2	21.3
Svalöv	Malmöhus	87.1	7,981	47.2	21.9	14.7	3.7	2.6	4.0	2.5	1.7	1.7	53.8	42.9
Svedala	Malmöhus	90.0	11,355	51.0	25.6	5.7	5.3	2.9	3.1	2.8	1.8	1.9	57.0	39.3
Svenljunga	Älvsborg	86.7	7,024	40.0	21.8	18.5	6.2	3.0	5.0	4.2	1.0	0.3	48.0	50.7
Säffle	Värmland	84.8	11,385	45.7	18.4	16.4	5.2	4.5	3.8	4.4	1.0	0.7	53.9	44.4
Säter	Kopparberg	86.4	7,349	43.6	16.9	15.9	4.9	6.9	5.3	3.9	1.6	1.1	55.7	41.6
Sävsjö	Jönköping	86.1	7,533	32.3	20.0	18.2	4.1	4.4	3.5	15.5	0.9	1.0	40.2	57.9
Söderhamn	Gävleborg	85.9	19,456	58.6	11.1	7.8	4.4	8.9	5.1	2.3	1.1	0.7	72.6	25.5
Söderköping	Östergötland	87.5	8,711	38.7	25.6	13.9	4.7	3.8	5.9	4.5	1.8	1.2	48.4	48.7
Södertälje	Stockholm	84.3	46,151	49.2	22.8	4.5	7.1	5.5	5.9	3.1	1.1	0.9	60.6	37.4
Sölvesborg	Blekinge	86.5	10,582	53.9	20.6	6.7	4.2	5.2	3.8	3.4	1.6	0.7	62.8	34.9
Tanum	Bohus	83.7	7,582	32.0	22.7	19.7	8.3	4.0	7.7	3.2	1.8	0.6	43.7	53.9
Tibro	Skaraborg	87.6	7,200	44.4	17.9	10.1	7.9	5.1	4.3	7.8	1.6	0.8	53.9	43.8
Tidaholm	Skaraborg	88.8	8,707	51.4	14.9	10.8	6.0	5.8	3.7	5.1	1.6	0.8	60.9	36.8
Tierp	Uppsala	87.9	13,309	57.1	11.5	13.3	5.3	4.4	3.7	2.9	1.1	0.8	65.2	32.9
Timrå	Västernorrland	87.0	12,338	62.6	7.8	7.6	5.0	9.1	3.6	2.8	0.8	0.8	75.3	23.1
Tingsryd	Kronoberg	84.8	9,050	39.9	21.3	20.9	3.0	4.4	4.3	4.1	1.3	0.8	48.6	49.4
Tjörn	Bohus	87.3	9,081	33.5	26.8	6.1	10.6	3.7	5.2	11.1	2.6	0.6	42.3	54.5
Tomelilla	Kristianstad	83.2	7,905	41.7	24.8	14.5	3.8	2.6	3.6	2.5	1.7	4.7	47.9	45.7
Torsby	Värmland	86.4	9,873	52.1	17.8	11.3	2.9	8.6	3.6	2.3	0.7	0.7	64.3	34.3
Torsås	Kalmar	85.8	5,115	40.2	18.6	22.0	3.2	3.0	5.0	5.5	2.0	0.5	48.2	49.4
Tranemo	Älvsborg	89.8	7,960	42.2	20.5	18.6	5.8	2.8	4.7	4.0	1.1	0.2	49.8	48.9
Tranås	Jönköping	88.0	12,082	45.9	19.8	8.5	5.9	4.1	4.4	9.2	1.0	1.1	54.5	43.4
Trelleborg	Malmöhus	87.8	23,913	56.7	21.8	5.8	3.8	2.8	3.2	2.5	2.2	1.2	62.7	33.9
Trollhättan	Älvsborg	88.0	32,726	54.4	16.6	5.8	6.9	6.5	4.9	3.1	1.0	0.9	65.8	32.3
Trosa	Södermanland	89.1	6,225	41.8	26.3	6.7	8.6	4.6	5.8	3.4	0.8	2.1	52.1	45.0
Tyresö	Stockholm	88.4	21,122	38.9	31.5	3.3	9.2	6.1	5.2	3.3	1.7	0.9	50.2	47.2
Täby	Stockholm	91.4	37,092	22.8	47.3	3.6	13.5	2.8	4.3	4.2	0.9	0.7	29.9	68.5
Töreboda	Skaraborg	84.2	6,396	40.9	19.5	18.4	3.3	5.8	5.1	5.1	1.4	0.5	51.8	46.3
Uddevalla	Bohus	87.0	31,259	49.7	17.3	6.8	6.5	6.8	5.7	4.2	1.5	1.5	62.2	34.9
Ulricehamn	Älvsborg	88.3	14,922	35.4	21.9	16.8	6.9	4.0	7.0	6.3	1.3	0.4	46.3	51.9
Umeå	Västerbotten	87.9	62,484	48.4	13.8	6.9	9.6	8.1	7.8	4.3	0.5	0.8	64.2	34.5
Upplands-Bro	Stockholm	88.2	11,368	44.9	27.1	3.9	7.5	5.8	4.0	4.8	1.2	0.8	54.6	43.3
Upplands Väsby	Stockholm	86.4	20,281	43.1	28.5	2.9	9.0	5.8	5.3	3.0	1.4	1.0	54.2	43.4
Uppsala	Uppsala	88.1	111,438	38.5	23.9	6.3	10.9	6.7	7.1	4.5	1.1	1.0	52.3	45.6
Uppvidinge	Kronoberg	86.8	6,726	47.0	15.5	17.6	3.6	7.5	3.9	3.3	0.6	0.8	58.4	40.1
Vadstena	Östergötland	89.9	5,259	46.6	21.3	10.0	6.5	3.8	5.6	4.9	0.9	0.4	56.0	42.7
Vaggeryd	Jönköping	89.5	8,105	40.6	19.1	11.5	4.9	5.2	3.7	13.5	0.6	0.9	49.5	49.0
Valdemarsvik	Östergötland	87.9	5,817	47.8	18.0	15.4	2.9	3.6	4.7	4.5	1.5	1.6	56.1	40.8
Vallentuna	Stockholm	89.0	13,908	32.3	35.2	6.9	9.5	4.5	5.9	4.1	1.1	0.7	42.7	55.6
Vansbro	Kopparberg	83.3	4,958	50.3	12.9	14.7	4.1	6.3	4.5	5.3	0.9	0.9	61.1	37.1
Vara	Skaraborg	85.3	10,656	31.9	26.1	21.2	5.1	3.7	5.1	4.7	1.9	0.4	40.6	57.0
Varberg	Halland	88.0	32,797	43.0	20.6	15.2	5.7	5.3	4.4	3.9	1.1	0.8	52.7	45.5
Vaxholm	Stockholm	89.8	4,999	30.7	36.9	6.2	10.2	4.4	6.7	3.2	1.0	0.8	41.8	56.4
Vellinge	Malmöhus	92.6	19,636	29.1	49.5	3.9	6.6	1.2	2.4	3.4	2.6	1.2	32.7	63.5
Vetlanda	Jönköping	87.9	18,284	38.9	17.8	15.9	5.3	4.8	3.9	11.2	1.3	0.8	47.7	50.2
Vilhelmina	Västerbotten	84.7	5,365	56.7	6.8	8.4	8.3	7.1	5.0	5.9	0.8	1.0	68.8	29.5
Vimmerby	Kalmar	87.3	10,536	42.4	17.2	20.9	2.8	4.8	4.3	5.1	1.6	0.9	51.5	46.0
Vindeln	Västerbotten	84.1	4,162	43.5	13.1	16.1	9.3	4.0	5.6	7.1	0.4	0.9	53.1	45.6
Vingåker	Södermanland	89.6	6,389	52.4	15.1	9.7	4.7	4.7	8.9	3.8	0.5	0.2	66.0	33.3
Vårgårda	Älvsborg	87.6	6,615	34.0	16.9	16.3	7.2	4.4	6.8	12.8	1.2	0.5	45.2	53.1
Vänersborg	Älvsborg	86.7	23,752	46.1	17.9	10.2	7.0	6.7	5.9	4.4	1.2	0.6	58.7	39.5
Vännäs	Västerbotten	86.0	5,481	50.4	9.7	15.1	6.1	7.2	5.1	4.9	0.6	0.9	62.8	35.8
Värmdö	Stockholm	88.5	15,208	38.7	33.0	4.1	7.5	6.6	5.4	2.5	1.4	0.9	49.4	48.3
Värnamo	Jönköping	89.2	20,433	39.9	20.0	12.3	6.2	3.1	4.3	12.1	0.8	1.1	47.4	50.7
Västervik	Kalmar	86.2	25,782	51.3	17.0	10.6	4.7	6.9	4.7	3.3	1.0	0.6	62.8	35.6
Västerås	Västmanland	86.5	77,600	48.7	23.3	3.2	9.3	5.1	4.6	3.5	1.3	0.9	58.4	39.3
Växjö	Kronoberg	88.6	47,181	40.4	24.6	10.1	7.2	6.5	5.1	4.4	0.7	1.0	51.9	46.3
Ydre	Östergötland	89.3	2,800	33.4	16.5	23.4	5.5	3.5	5.8	10.5	0.7	0.8	42.6	55.9
Ystad	Malmöhus	86.1	16,859	47.8	27.3	8.0	5.0	2.6	3.8	2.0	1.9	1.6	54.2	42.2
Åmål	Älvsborg	84.6	8,571	51.3	18.2	11.0	5.3	4.8	4.3	3.8	0.9	0.4	60.4	38.3
Ånge	Västernorrland	84.8	8,138	55.9	9.6	12.6	3.1	8.7	6.5	2.3	0.7	0.7	71.1	27.6
Åre	Jämtland	86.2	6,370	43.1	14.4	20.7	4.6	5.6	7.2	3.0	0.5	0.8	56.0	42.7
Årjäng	Värmland	79.2	5,651	34.0	16.5	25.7	5.8	4.4	5.0	6.6	1.2	0.8	43.4	54.6
Åsele	Västerbotten	85.1	2,705	59.9	8.1	12.6	4.7	5.1	4.1	4.4	0.7	0.5	69.1	29.8
Åstorp	Kristianstad	85.3	7,802	55.5	22.6	6.8	3.5	2.8	2.9	3.3	1.9	0.6	61.2	36.3
Åtvidaberg	Östergötland	89.5	8,477	54.3	15.1	10.8	4.8	4.6	4.4	4.2	0.7	1.1	63.3	34.9
Älmhult	Kronoberg	87.8	10,305	45.6	22.0	13.7	4.7	3.3	4.1	4.8	0.8	1.0	52.9	45.3
Älvdalen	Kopparberg	82.3	5,161	48.6	13.8	17.2	3.9	5.6	6.7	2.8	0.9	0.6	60.9	37.6
Älvkarleby	Uppsala	88.7	6,108	71.6	8.8	2.8	4.8	6.2	3.0	1.2	0.9	0.7	80.8	17.5
Älvsbyn	Norrbotten	89.1	6,429	63.7	6.1	6.4	3.3	12.7	3.1	3.4	0.4	1.0	79.6	19.1
Ängelholm	Kristianstad	85.4	22,866	34.6	35.5	9.7	5.8	3.0	4.3	4.3	1.7	1.1	41.9	55.3
Öckerö	Bohus	89.0	7,395	33.8	24.8	3.2	8.8	4.4	5.1	17.9	1.3	0.6	43.3	54.8
Ödeshög	Östergötland	88.9	3,897	41.1	19.3	16.7	4.3	3.4	5.6	7.9	0.9	0.8	50.1	48.2
Örebro	Örebro	87.6	76,606	46.2	18.7	5.3	9.7	6.7	5.2	5.8	1.4	1.1	58.1	39.5
Örkelljunga	Kristianstad	82.6	5,688	34.9	28.3	12.7	4.5	2.1	4.0	10.1	1.9	1.6	41.0	55.6
Örnsköldsvik	Västernorrland	88.3	39,472	56.2	11.3	10.7	6.3	4.4	3.8	6.3	0.4	0.5	64.4	34.6
Östersund	Jämtland	86.2	39,221	49.0	15.8	12.3	5.8	6.8	6.4	2.6	0.6	0.6	62.3	36.5
Österåker	Stockholm	89.1	19,191	34.7	36.1	4.2	10.1	4.4	5.5	2.9	1.3	0.9	44.6	53.2
Östhammar	Uppsala	85.5	13,722	50.6	17.5	12.7	4.8	4.6	5.3	2.0	1.5	0.8	60.6	37.1
Östra Göinge	Kristianstad	86.5	9,371	57.7	16.0	8.0	3.8	4.6	3.9	4.0	1.2	0.7	66.3	31.8
Överkalix	Norrbotten	86.1	3,166	65.0	5.1	11.2	3.1	11.8	1.9	0.9	0.4	0.8	78.6	20.2
Övertorneå	Norrbotten	84.3	3,628	52.6	9.7	16.2	2.4	12.2	1.9	2.8	0.3	1.8	66.8	31.1
Total		86.8	5,555,540	45.3	22.4	7.7	7.2	6.2	5.0	4.1	1.2	1.0	56.4	41.3
Source: SCB

== Municipal results ==
Votes by municipality. The municipalities are the color of the party that got the most votes within the coalition that won relative majority.

Cartogram of the map to the left with each municipality rescaled to the number of valid votes cast.

Map showing the voting shifts from the 1991 to the 1994 election. Darker blue indicates a municipality voted more towards the parties that formed the centre-right bloc. Darker red indicates a municipality voted more towards the parties that form the left-wing bloc.

Votes by municipality as a scale from red/Left-wing bloc to blue/Centre-right bloc.

Cartogram of vote with each municipality rescaled in proportion to number of valid votes cast. Deeper blue represents a relative majority for the centre-right coalition, brighter red represents a relative majority for the left-wing coalition.

=== Blekinge ===
Location	Turnout	Share	Votes	S	M	C	FP	V	MP	KDS	NyD	Other	Left	Right
Karlshamn	88.0	21.1	21,163	56.5	15.6	6.0	4.9	7.5	5.0	3.0	0.9	0.5	69.1	29.5
Karlskrona	88.2	39.9	40,021	49.1	20.7	8.0	5.9	6.3	4.5	3.7	1.2	0.6	59.9	38.4
Olofström	85.4	9.1	9,100	58.4	13.2	6.9	4.8	6.9	4.3	3.8	0.8	0.8	69.6	28.7
Ronneby	87.6	19.3	19,369	53.5	18.5	9.4	4.6	6.3	4.0	2.3	0.8	0.5	63.9	34.8
Sölvesborg	86.5	10.6	10,582	53.9	20.6	6.7	4.2	5.2	3.8	3.4	1.6	0.7	62.8	34.9
Total	87.6	1.8	100,235	52.9	18.5	7.6	5.2	6.5	4.4	3.3	1.1	0.6	63.8	34.6
Source: SCB

=== Dalarna ===
Kopparberg County

Location	Turnout	Share	Votes	S	M	C	FP	V	MP	KDS	NyD	Other	Left	Right
Avesta	86.1	8.5	15,731	56.5	11.9	10.1	4.6	7.9	4.6	3.0	0.7	0.7	68.9	29.7
Borlänge	86.2	16.6	30,506	55.5	14.5	6.3	5.6	7.5	5.7	3.0	1.0	0.9	68.7	29.4
Falun	85.5	18.7	34,446	41.5	21.5	9.6	8.5	6.0	7.0	4.2	0.9	0.9	54.4	43.8
Gagnef	87.0	3.5	6,529	45.9	14.3	15.2	4.7	5.4	7.5	5.1	1.2	0.8	58.8	39.3
Hedemora	86.0	5.8	10,706	49.3	14.6	12.3	4.8	5.4	5.6	3.7	0.9	1.3	62.7	35.4
Leksand	86.3	5.4	9,994	38.6	20.2	13.0	5.9	5.4	7.6	7.7	0.9	0.6	51.6	46.8
Ludvika	86.1	10.1	18,636	60.1	12.1	4.9	4.6	9.5	4.8	2.4	1.0	0.6	74.4	24.0
Malung	86.2	4.1	7,527	49.9	17.7	12.3	6.5	5.9	3.7	2.5	0.7	0.7	59.5	39.1
Mora	81.5	6.9	12,704	44.7	18.4	11.2	6.4	5.8	7.5	4.3	1.0	0.8	58.0	40.3
Orsa	82.4	2.5	4,520	43.9	14.6	12.5	4.5	8.7	8.6	5.2	1.5	0.6	61.2	36.7
Rättvik	79.7	3.8	7,014	42.3	19.9	12.6	7.0	4.9	6.8	4.2	1.8	0.6	53.9	43.7
Smedjebacken	87.3	4.5	8,275	60.4	11.6	8.0	3.7	8.6	4.5	1.7	1.0	0.6	73.4	25.0
Säter	86.4	4.0	7,349	43.6	16.9	15.9	4.9	6.9	5.3	3.9	1.6	1.1	55.7	41.6
Vansbro	83.3	2.7	4,958	50.3	12.9	14.7	4.1	6.3	4.5	5.3	0.9	0.9	61.1	37.1
Älvdalen	82.3	2.8	5,161	48.6	13.8	17.2	3.9	5.6	6.7	2.8	0.9	0.6	60.9	37.6
Total	85.2	3.3	184,056	49.5	16.2	10.1	5.8	7.0	6.0	3.7	1.0	0.8	62.4	35.8
Source: SCB

=== Gotland ===
Location	Turnout	Share	Votes	S	M	C	FP	V	MP	KDS	NyD	Other	Left	Right
Gotland	86.1	100.0	37,009	43.5	18.0	17.9	4.5	5.2	6.7	2.5	1.3	0.4	55.4	42.9
Total	86.1	0.7	37,009	43.5	18.0	17.9	4.5	5.2	6.7	2.5	1.3	0.4	55.4	42.9
Source: SCB

=== Gävleborg ===
Location	Turnout	Share	Votes	S	M	C	FP	V	MP	KDS	NyD	Other	Left	Right
Bollnäs	84.7	9.7	18,152	50.8	12.3	12.4	5.5	7.8	6.2	3.3	0.7	1.0	64.9	33.5
Gävle	85.9	31.2	58,260	54.0	16.5	4.4	8.1	6.8	5.3	2.8	1.4	0.6	66.1	31.9
Hofors	86.0	3.9	7,354	63.2	10.2	5.4	3.7	11.2	3.7	1.5	0.7	0.5	78.1	20.8
Hudiksvall	83.6	13.0	24,323	47.9	11.8	13.7	4.3	9.3	7.5	3.6	1.3	0.6	64.7	33.4
Ljusdal	81.7	7.1	13,316	51.5	13.0	12.4	5.6	8.4	5.3	2.5	0.9	0.3	65.2	33.6
Nordanstig	83.3	3.8	7,052	45.7	9.2	18.1	4.4	8.1	7.7	4.8	1.4	0.6	61.6	36.4
Ockelbo	83.9	2.2	4,089	54.0	11.1	15.1	3.4	7.9	4.1	3.0	0.9	0.5	66.0	32.6
Ovanåker	87.2	4.7	8,767	45.7	10.0	19.0	5.3	4.8	5.4	8.9	0.5	0.5	55.8	43.2
Sandviken	87.4	14.0	26,190	59.7	12.8	6.7	5.2	7.8	4.1	2.5	1.0	0.3	71.5	27.2
Söderhamn	85.9	10.4	19,456	58.6	11.1	7.8	4.4	8.9	5.1	2.3	1.1	0.7	72.6	25.5
Total	85.3	3.4	186,959	53.6	13.2	9.1	5.8	7.9	5.5	3.2	1.1	0.6	67.0	31.3
Source: SCB

=== Halland ===
Location	Turnout	Share	Votes	S	M	C	FP	V	MP	KDS	NyD	Other	Left	Right
Falkenberg	88.2	14.5	24,715	40.3	21.1	18.7	4.8	3.9	5.0	3.7	1.4	1.1	49.2	48.3
Halmstad	87.4	31.4	53,603	46.2	24.8	7.5	6.7	4.6	4.6	3.2	1.5	0.9	55.4	42.2
Hylte	86.3	4.0	6,809	45.9	16.1	20.7	5.2	2.8	3.9	3.5	1.3	0.6	52.6	45.6
Kungsbacka	89.8	22.5	38,373	30.9	35.4	9.0	9.6	3.6	4.7	4.4	1.8	0.4	39.3	58.5
Laholm	85.9	8.5	14,444	35.1	23.8	21.3	4.4	3.5	5.3	3.6	1.8	1.0	44.0	53.2
Varberg	88.0	19.2	32,797	43.0	20.6	15.2	5.7	5.3	4.4	3.9	1.1	0.8	52.7	45.5
Total	88.0	3.1	170,741	40.4	25.4	12.6	6.7	4.2	4.7	3.7	1.5	0.8	49.3	48.4
Source: SCB

=== Jämtland ===
Location	Turnout	Share	Votes	S	M	C	FP	V	MP	KDS	NyD	Other	Left	Right
Berg	83.1	6.1	5,404	46.8	10.8	25.5	2.7	5.6	4.7	2.2	0.5	1.1	57.1	41.3
Bräcke	85.1	6.2	5,468	59.6	9.9	14.6	2.6	6.7	4.7	1.1	0.3	0.5	70.9	28.3
Härjedalen	82.9	9.1	8,024	58.1	11.8	10.9	3.9	7.2	5.0	1.7	0.7	0.8	70.3	28.3
Krokom	86.6	10.5	9,280	48.8	11.8	19.0	3.6	6.1	6.4	2.9	0.5	0.9	61.4	37.2
Ragunda	86.0	5.1	4,493	56.0	9.3	16.2	2.1	8.5	5.5	1.6	0.3	0.6	70.0	29.2
Strömsund	85.3	11.6	10,228	58.4	8.1	15.4	3.5	7.6	3.9	2.0	0.5	0.7	69.9	29.0
Åre	86.2	7.2	6,370	43.1	14.4	20.7	4.6	5.6	7.2	3.0	0.5	0.8	56.0	42.7
Östersund	86.2	44.3	39,221	49.0	15.8	12.3	5.8	6.8	6.4	2.6	0.6	0.6	62.3	36.5
Total	85.6	1.6	88,488	51.3	13.0	15.0	4.5	6.8	5.8	2.4	0.5	0.7	63.9	34.8
Source: SCB

=== Jönköping ===
Location	Turnout	Share	Votes	S	M	C	FP	V	MP	KDS	NyD	Other	Left	Right
Aneby	89.0	2.2	4,490	35.2	17.0	16.9	5.1	2.8	4.2	16.8	0.9	1.1	42.2	55.8
Eksjö	87.3	5.8	11,717	37.6	21.0	15.8	5.6	3.6	5.3	9.2	0.9	1.1	46.5	51.5
Gislaved	88.2	9.0	17,982	43.4	20.9	13.9	6.4	2.9	4.4	6.5	0.8	0.8	50.7	47.7
Gnosjö	89.4	2.9	5,889	35.6	22.7	11.2	5.5	2.9	3.2	16.2	1.1	1.5	41.7	55.6
Jönköping	88.3	36.8	73,866	43.3	20.7	6.7	7.3	5.1	4.1	10.7	1.1	1.1	52.4	45.4
Nässjö	88.9	10.2	20,383	46.5	17.5	10.6	5.4	4.9	4.3	8.6	1.0	1.1	55.7	42.1
Sävsjö	86.1	3.8	7,533	32.3	20.0	18.2	4.1	4.4	3.5	15.5	0.9	1.0	40.2	57.9
Tranås	88.0	6.0	12,082	45.9	19.8	8.5	5.9	4.1	4.4	9.2	1.0	1.1	54.5	43.4
Vaggeryd	89.5	4.0	8,105	40.6	19.1	11.5	4.9	5.2	3.7	13.5	0.6	0.9	49.5	49.0
Vetlanda	87.9	9.1	18,284	38.9	17.8	15.9	5.3	4.8	3.9	11.2	1.3	0.8	47.7	50.2
Värnamo	89.2	10.2	20,433	39.9	20.0	12.3	6.2	3.1	4.3	12.1	0.8	1.1	47.4	50.7
Total	88.3	3.6	200,764	41.8	19.9	10.8	6.2	4.4	4.2	10.7	1.0	1.0	50.3	47.6
Source: SCB

=== Kalmar ===
Location	Turnout	Share	Votes	S	M	C	FP	V	MP	KDS	NyD	Other	Left	Right
Borgholm	85.7	4.8	7,653	33.3	22.6	24.0	3.7	3.6	5.4	5.3	1.3	0.9	42.3	55.6
Emmaboda	87.6	4.4	6,902	50.6	15.0	16.9	3.5	4.3	4.7	3.7	1.0	0.4	59.5	39.1
Hultsfred	86.9	6.8	10,764	49.2	14.7	16.6	3.1	6.6	2.7	5.6	1.1	0.5	58.5	39.9
Högsby	86.4	2.8	4,473	49.0	15.5	16.1	2.6	6.0	3.7	5.5	0.9	0.9	58.6	39.6
Kalmar	87.7	24.0	37,996	46.7	23.4	7.8	5.9	5.4	4.9	3.7	1.3	0.8	57.0	40.9
Mönsterås	88.7	5.6	8,867	51.6	15.5	14.5	3.1	6.0	3.6	4.0	1.2	0.4	61.2	37.1
Mörbylånga	87.7	5.6	8,842	40.3	22.3	17.1	5.2	4.2	5.1	3.4	1.5	0.8	49.7	48.0
Nybro	87.3	8.6	13,619	49.9	17.0	14.1	3.2	5.7	3.6	4.5	1.3	0.6	59.3	38.8
Oskarshamn	87.7	11.3	17,875	52.6	18.5	7.3	4.7	6.1	3.7	5.7	1.2	0.2	62.4	36.2
Torsås	85.8	3.2	5,115	40.2	18.6	22.0	3.2	3.0	5.0	5.5	2.0	0.5	48.2	49.4
Vimmerby	87.3	6.7	10,536	42.4	17.2	20.9	2.8	4.8	4.3	5.1	1.6	0.9	51.5	46.0
Västervik	86.2	16.3	25,782	51.3	17.0	10.6	4.7	6.9	4.7	3.3	1.0	0.6	62.8	35.6
Total	87.2	2.9	158,424	47.6	19.0	13.0	4.4	5.6	4.3	4.3	1.3	0.6	57.5	40.6
Source: SCB

=== Kronoberg ===
Location	Turnout	Share	Votes	S	M	C	FP	V	MP	KDS	NyD	Other	Left	Right
Alvesta	88.1	10.8	12,465	42.2	20.2	17.0	4.0	5.5	4.1	4.7	1.4	1.0	51.8	45.8
Lessebo	89.2	5.0	5,760	56.5	14.7	9.0	3.9	7.8	4.6	2.1	0.8	0.7	68.9	29.7
Ljungby	86.6	15.2	17,614	41.0	19.8	15.2	4.9	5.3	5.4	6.9	0.8	0.7	51.6	46.8
Markaryd	85.8	5.7	6,634	46.7	18.3	12.2	4.1	5.0	4.8	6.6	1.0	1.1	56.6	41.3
Tingsryd	84.8	7.8	9,050	39.9	21.3	20.9	3.0	4.4	4.3	4.1	1.3	0.8	48.6	49.4
Uppvidinge	86.8	5.8	6,726	47.0	15.5	17.6	3.6	7.5	3.9	3.3	0.6	0.8	58.4	40.1
Växjö	88.6	40.8	47,181	40.4	24.6	10.1	7.2	6.5	5.1	4.4	0.7	1.0	51.9	46.3
Älmhult	87.8	8.9	10,305	45.6	22.0	13.7	4.7	3.3	4.1	4.8	0.8	1.0	52.9	45.3
Total	87.6	2.1	115,735	42.6	21.5	13.3	5.4	5.8	4.8	4.8	0.9	0.9	53.2	45.0
Source: SCB

=== Norrbotten ===
Location	Turnout	Share	Votes	S	M	C	FP	V	MP	KDS	NyD	Other	Left	Right
Arjeplog	83.6	1.4	2,381	55.9	8.7	8.3	3.9	13.8	5.0	2.9	0.2	1.4	74.7	23.7
Arvidsjaur	87.0	3.1	5,390	62.0	8.8	6.5	3.9	12.1	2.8	2.7	0.3	0.9	76.8	22.0
Boden	89.1	11.7	20,391	59.7	13.6	5.3	4.5	9.2	3.7	2.8	0.4	0.8	72.5	26.3
Gällivare	83.4	8.2	14,213	60.3	9.9	2.5	3.0	17.4	3.3	1.6	0.4	1.6	81.0	17.0
Haparanda	79.4	2.9	5,112	59.3	12.8	11.2	3.3	6.8	2.6	2.3	0.4	1.4	68.7	29.5
Jokkmokk	84.5	2.4	4,235	64.0	7.9	3.3	4.0	11.5	6.0	1.5	0.4	1.4	81.5	16.7
Kalix	88.6	7.3	12,721	66.3	8.6	6.9	4.0	8.6	2.8	1.6	0.4	0.9	77.7	21.0
Kiruna	84.5	9.4	16,299	58.6	9.2	2.0	3.6	19.2	3.6	2.0	0.5	1.4	81.4	16.8
Luleå	88.5	26.9	46,798	57.2	13.1	4.7	7.1	9.6	4.4	2.8	0.3	0.7	71.1	27.8
Pajala	84.8	3.1	5,394	54.0	8.2	6.1	3.4	20.3	2.1	3.3	0.3	2.4	76.4	21.0
Piteå	90.8	16.0	27,888	66.6	7.5	5.9	4.3	8.1	3.1	3.3	0.2	1.0	77.8	21.0
Älvsbyn	89.1	3.7	6,429	63.7	6.1	6.4	3.3	12.7	3.1	3.4	0.4	1.0	79.6	19.1
Överkalix	86.1	1.8	3,166	65.0	5.1	11.2	3.1	11.8	1.9	0.9	0.4	0.8	78.6	20.2
Övertorneå	84.3	2.1	3,628	52.6	9.7	16.2	2.4	12.2	1.9	2.8	0.3	1.8	66.8	31.1
Total	87.4	3.1	174,045	60.6	10.3	5.4	4.7	11.4	3.5	2.6	0.3	1.1	75.5	23.1
Source: SCB

=== Skåne ===
Skåne was divided into two separate counties at the time. Malmöhus was divided into one covering Malmö Municipality and two covering the northern and southern parts of the county. Kristianstad County was one constituency for the whole county.

==== Kristianstad ====
Location	Turnout	Share	Votes	S	M	C	FP	V	MP	KDS	NyD	Other	Left	Right
Bromölla	88.0	4.3	8,034	64.0	11.8	4.7	3.9	6.9	4.3	2.6	1.2	0.7	75.2	23.0
Båstad	86.1	4.9	9,167	22.8	40.1	17.0	6.7	1.6	4.5	4.5	2.2	0.7	28.8	68.3
Hässleholm	84.7	17.0	31,535	43.9	22.4	11.7	5.2	3.6	4.8	5.4	1.5	1.5	52.3	44.7
Klippan	83.2	5.3	9,875	46.0	26.5	10.3	4.0	3.0	3.4	3.3	1.9	1.4	52.5	44.2
Kristianstad	86.1	25.5	47,261	48.8	24.4	6.8	6.3	3.5	4.0	3.3	1.2	1.8	56.2	40.7
Osby	86.2	4.7	8,624	51.8	17.8	10.8	4.5	3.8	4.4	5.2	1.0	0.8	59.9	38.3
Perstorp	84.3	2.3	4,350	50.2	21.9	9.4	5.0	4.4	3.3	3.6	1.1	1.1	57.9	39.8
Simrishamn	83.4	7.0	12,902	43.2	25.7	11.4	4.6	4.0	4.1	2.8	2.1	2.1	51.3	44.5
Tomelilla	83.2	4.3	7,905	41.7	24.8	14.5	3.8	2.6	3.6	2.5	1.7	4.7	47.9	45.7
Åstorp	85.3	4.2	7,802	55.5	22.6	6.8	3.5	2.8	2.9	3.3	1.9	0.6	61.2	36.3
Ängelholm	85.4	12.3	22,866	34.6	35.5	9.7	5.8	3.0	4.3	4.3	1.7	1.1	41.9	55.3
Örkelljunga	82.6	3.1	5,688	34.9	28.3	12.7	4.5	2.1	4.0	10.1	1.9	1.6	41.0	55.6
Östra Göinge	86.5	5.1	9,371	57.7	16.0	8.0	3.8	4.6	3.9	4.0	1.2	0.7	66.3	31.8
Total	85.2	3.3	185,380	45.2	25.1	9.7	5.2	3.5	4.1	4.1	1.5	1.5	52.8	44.1
Source: SCB

==== Malmö ====
Location	Turnout	Share	Votes	S	M	C	FP	V	MP	KDS	NyD	Other	Left	Right
Malmö	84.5	100.0	146,509	48.8	27.6	2.0	5.7	4.4	3.7	2.5	2.0	3.3	56.9	37.8
Total	84.5	2.6	146,509	48.8	27.6	2.0	5.7	4.4	3.7	2.5	2.0	3.3	56.9	37.8
Source: SCB

==== Malmöhus N ====
Location	Turnout	Share	Votes	S	M	C	FP	V	MP	KDS	NyD	Other	Left	Right
Bjuv	86.7	5.4	8,615	60.9	19.0	5.8	3.8	3.4	2.6	1.9	1.3	1.3	66.9	30.5
Eslöv	85.4	11.2	18,014	50.2	22.8	10.9	3.8	3.1	3.4	2.2	2.0	1.5	56.8	39.7
Helsingborg	84.9	44.1	70,725	45.2	28.8	4.2	6.6	4.1	4.2	2.8	1.1	3.0	53.5	42.4
Höganäs	88.3	9.4	15,083	38.7	33.8	6.3	7.4	3.0	4.6	4.2	1.3	0.8	46.3	51.6
Hörby	84.5	5.4	8,598	34.2	24.4	17.5	4.4	2.2	4.4	5.3	2.5	5.1	40.8	51.7
Höör	85.5	5.1	8,254	38.2	27.7	12.0	5.1	3.1	5.7	4.1	1.5	2.7	46.9	48.9
Landskrona	86.9	14.4	23,145	56.3	24.5	3.4	4.5	3.6	3.1	1.6	2.0	0.9	63.0	34.1
Svalöv	87.1	5.0	7,981	47.2	21.9	14.7	3.7	2.6	4.0	2.5	1.7	1.7	53.8	42.9
Total	85.8	2.9	160,415	46.8	26.8	6.8	5.6	3.5	4.0	2.8	1.5	2.3	54.3	42.0
Source: SCB

==== Malmöhus S ====
Location	Turnout	Share	Votes	S	M	C	FP	V	MP	KDS	NyD	Other	Left	Right
Burlöv	89.3	4.5	9,001	57.8	22.4	2.8	5.2	3.1	2.9	1.8	1.9	2.2	63.8	32.2
Kävlinge	89.9	7.6	15,284	50.6	26.7	5.5	5.8	2.3	3.2	2.0	1.5	2.3	56.2	40.1
Lomma	92.4	5.9	11,858	36.8	39.2	3.6	9.1	1.6	3.2	3.3	1.8	1.3	41.6	55.3
Lund	89.7	30.9	62,002	35.3	29.4	4.9	12.5	5.8	7.0	3.0	1.0	1.1	48.0	49.9
Sjöbo	84.4	5.2	10,357	39.1	24.4	14.1	3.0	2.3	3.3	2.0	1.7	10.0	44.8	43.5
Skurup	85.7	4.2	8,518	44.2	24.7	13.2	4.6	2.8	3.7	1.7	1.9	3.0	50.8	44.2
Staffanstorp	90.5	6.0	12,026	43.9	30.8	5.7	7.8	2.0	3.0	2.7	2.9	1.1	49.0	47.0
Svedala	90.0	5.7	11,355	51.0	25.6	5.7	5.3	2.9	3.1	2.8	1.8	1.9	57.0	39.3
Trelleborg	87.8	11.9	23,913	56.7	21.8	5.8	3.8	2.8	3.2	2.5	2.2	1.2	62.7	33.9
Vellinge	92.6	9.8	19,636	29.1	49.5	3.9	6.6	1.2	2.4	3.4	2.6	1.2	32.7	63.5
Ystad	86.1	8.4	16,859	47.8	27.3	8.0	5.0	2.6	3.8	2.0	1.9	1.6	54.2	42.2
Total	89.2	3.6	200,809	42.5	29.8	6.0	7.7	3.4	4.3	2.7	1.7	1.9	50.3	46.1
Source: SCB

=== Stockholm ===
==== Stockholm (city) ====
Location	Turnout	Share	Votes	S	M	C	FP	V	MP	KDS	NyD	Other	Left	Right
Stockholm	85.4	100.0	438,432	34.8	32.2	3.2	10.2	8.4	5.8	3.0	1.3	1.1	49.1	48.6
Total	85.4	7.9	438,432	34.8	32.2	3.2	10.2	8.4	5.8	3.0	1.3	1.1	49.1	48.6
Source: SCB

==== Stockholm County ====
Location	Turnout	Share	Votes	S	M	C	FP	V	MP	KDS	NyD	Other	Left	Right
Botkyrka	83.6	5.7	34,056	48.5	23.4	2.8	7.6	6.7	5.1	3.1	1.8	1.1	60.2	36.9
Danderyd	92.1	3.2	18,924	14.2	58.0	3.4	12.0	1.8	3.2	5.9	0.9	0.5	19.2	79.4
Ekerö	90.0	2.1	12,605	28.4	37.6	7.2	10.3	4.3	6.3	3.5	1.0	1.4	39.0	58.5
Haninge	86.0	6.1	36,264	45.2	25.1	3.9	8.0	6.7	5.2	2.6	2.2	1.1	57.1	39.6
Huddinge	86.6	7.2	42,717	41.5	29.1	3.2	8.9	6.5	5.0	2.9	2.0	1.1	52.9	44.0
Järfälla	89.1	6.0	35,461	39.8	30.7	3.1	10.0	5.6	4.8	3.8	1.3	1.0	50.2	47.5
Lidingö	90.5	4.3	25,343	19.9	50.2	4.3	12.5	2.9	3.9	4.7	0.9	0.6	26.8	71.7
Nacka	88.1	6.8	40,670	31.7	37.3	3.2	11.4	5.6	5.2	3.2	1.3	1.2	42.4	55.1
Norrtälje	85.8	5.2	30,841	43.2	23.6	11.3	5.7	5.6	5.5	3.1	1.4	0.7	54.3	43.7
Nynäshamn	87.2	2.4	14,308	48.2	22.2	4.8	6.4	7.5	6.2	2.8	1.5	0.5	61.9	36.2
Salem	88.4	1.3	7,482	37.3	30.5	3.7	10.3	5.5	6.2	4.0	1.2	1.2	49.1	48.6
Sigtuna	85.7	3.2	18,929	42.6	29.2	5.6	7.7	4.9	4.5	3.1	1.7	0.7	52.0	45.6
Sollentuna	89.8	5.5	32,455	32.5	35.3	3.8	12.0	4.5	5.2	4.5	1.5	0.7	42.1	55.6
Solna	84.5	6.2	36,638	35.5	35.1	2.9	9.8	6.8	4.6	3.2	1.3	0.8	46.8	51.1
Sundbyberg	84.5	3.2	18,985	45.0	25.2	3.1	8.2	8.1	4.8	2.3	1.6	1.7	57.9	38.8
Södertälje	84.3	7.8	46,151	49.2	22.8	4.5	7.1	5.5	5.9	3.1	1.1	0.9	60.6	37.4
Tyresö	88.4	3.5	21,122	38.9	31.5	3.3	9.2	6.1	5.2	3.3	1.7	0.9	50.2	47.2
Täby	91.4	6.2	37,092	22.8	47.3	3.6	13.5	2.8	4.3	4.2	0.9	0.7	29.9	68.5
Upplands-Bro	88.2	1.9	11,368	44.9	27.1	3.9	7.5	5.8	4.0	4.8	1.2	0.8	54.6	43.3
Upplands Väsby	86.4	3.4	20,281	43.1	28.5	2.9	9.0	5.8	5.3	3.0	1.4	1.0	54.2	43.4
Vallentuna	89.0	2.3	13,908	32.3	35.2	6.9	9.5	4.5	5.9	4.1	1.1	0.7	42.7	55.6
Vaxholm	89.8	0.8	4,999	30.7	36.9	6.2	10.2	4.4	6.7	3.2	1.0	0.8	41.8	56.4
Värmdö	88.5	2.6	15,208	38.7	33.0	4.1	7.5	6.6	5.4	2.5	1.4	0.9	49.4	48.3
Österåker	89.1	3.2	19,191	34.7	36.1	4.2	10.1	4.4	5.5	2.9	1.3	0.9	44.6	53.2
Total	87.3	10.7	594,998	37.6	32.5	4.2	9.4	5.4	5.0	3.4	1.4	0.9	48.1	49.6
Source: SCB

=== Södermanland ===
Location	Turnout	Share	Votes	S	M	C	FP	V	MP	KDS	NyD	Other	Left	Right
Eskilstuna	85.9	33.6	55,238	54.2	17.8	4.8	7.1	5.6	4.5	3.2	1.3	1.5	64.3	32.9
Flen	87.7	6.6	10,924	52.1	17.1	9.2	5.1	6.1	5.0	3.6	0.7	1.1	63.2	34.9
Gnesta	86.7	3.6	5,892	42.2	19.6	13.3	6.0	5.5	7.7	3.6	0.9	1.2	55.5	42.5
Katrineholm	88.1	13.1	21,455	54.2	16.5	7.6	6.4	4.7	5.9	3.3	0.5	0.8	64.9	33.8
Nyköping	88.8	19.8	32,570	51.2	19.7	7.5	6.4	5.1	4.5	3.9	0.7	1.0	60.7	37.6
Oxelösund	88.8	4.7	7,772	63.3	12.8	2.9	5.0	8.1	4.0	2.1	0.8	0.9	75.5	22.8
Strängnäs	87.1	10.8	17,808	43.2	26.1	6.6	9.1	4.8	4.8	3.4	1.1	0.9	52.7	45.2
Trosa	89.1	3.8	6,225	41.8	26.3	6.7	8.6	4.6	5.8	3.4	0.8	2.1	52.1	45.0
Vingåker	89.6	3.9	6,389	52.4	15.1	9.7	4.7	4.7	8.9	3.8	0.5	0.2	66.0	33.3
Total	87.4	3.0	164,273	51.7	18.9	6.7	6.8	5.4	5.0	3.4	0.9	1.2	62.1	35.8
Source: SCB

=== Uppsala ===
Location	Turnout	Share	Votes	S	M	C	FP	V	MP	KDS	NyD	Other	Left	Right
Enköping	84.4	12.5	22,116	44.6	22.8	12.5	6.0	3.9	4.8	3.3	1.5	0.6	53.3	44.5
Håbo	87.7	5.6	9,801	39.9	34.1	4.7	6.7	4.4	4.1	2.8	1.8	1.4	48.5	48.4
Tierp	87.9	7.5	13,309	57.1	11.5	13.3	5.3	4.4	3.7	2.9	1.1	0.8	65.2	32.9
Uppsala	88.1	63.1	111,438	38.5	23.9	6.3	10.9	6.7	7.1	4.5	1.1	1.0	52.3	45.6
Älvkarleby	88.7	3.5	6,108	71.6	8.8	2.8	4.8	6.2	3.0	1.2	0.9	0.7	80.8	17.5
Östhammar	85.5	7.8	13,722	50.6	17.5	12.7	4.8	4.6	5.3	2.0	1.5	0.8	60.6	37.1
Total	87.4	3.2	176,494	42.8	22.4	7.9	9.0	5.9	6.1	3.8	1.2	0.9	54.8	43.0
Source: SCB

=== Värmland ===
Location	Turnout	Share	Votes	S	M	C	FP	V	MP	KDS	NyD	Other	Left	Right
Arvika	83.1	9.1	16,819	47.4	16.9	10.0	6.4	8.2	5.9	3.5	1.0	0.6	61.5	36.9
Eda	84.4	2.9	5,321	51.8	14.6	14.2	3.8	6.8	4.1	3.2	1.0	0.5	62.7	35.8
Filipstad	85.3	4.6	8,504	63.8	12.3	5.0	4.2	8.4	2.9	1.7	1.1	0.6	75.1	23.2
Forshaga	88.7	4.3	7,892	55.9	14.9	8.0	5.8	6.2	4.0	3.0	1.4	0.7	66.1	31.8
Grums	86.7	3.5	6,569	59.4	12.8	9.1	3.6	6.5	4.0	2.6	1.5	0.6	69.9	28.0
Hagfors	88.3	5.8	10,782	64.0	9.6	7.7	2.9	10.4	2.9	1.8	0.4	0.3	77.2	22.1
Hammarö	89.9	4.9	9,106	53.3	20.5	3.7	8.2	6.7	3.8	2.5	0.9	0.4	63.8	34.9
Karlstad	88.0	28.5	52,738	44.4	24.3	6.3	8.3	6.4	4.9	3.8	1.1	0.6	55.7	42.6
Kil	87.5	4.2	7,780	45.2	21.1	10.5	6.8	5.6	5.0	3.9	1.0	0.9	55.8	42.3
Kristinehamn	87.2	9.3	17,156	52.5	17.5	6.8	7.0	7.3	4.3	3.2	1.0	0.5	64.1	34.4
Munkfors	88.2	1.8	3,275	67.3	8.0	7.3	4.3	7.7	2.2	1.8	0.6	0.9	77.1	21.3
Storfors	88.9	1.8	3,334	59.0	13.0	7.8	4.8	7.8	3.0	3.0	1.0	0.5	69.8	28.6
Sunne	84.7	4.8	8,960	38.4	21.7	20.1	4.9	4.1	4.8	4.1	1.0	0.8	47.4	50.8
Säffle	84.8	6.1	11,385	45.7	18.4	16.4	5.2	4.5	3.8	4.4	1.0	0.7	53.9	44.4
Torsby	86.4	5.3	9,873	52.1	17.8	11.3	2.9	8.6	3.6	2.3	0.7	0.7	64.3	34.3
Årjäng	79.2	3.1	5,651	34.0	16.5	25.7	5.8	4.4	5.0	6.6	1.2	0.8	43.4	54.6
Total	86.6	3.3	185,145	49.7	18.6	9.4	6.2	6.8	4.4	3.4	1.0	0.6	60.9	37.5
Source: SCB

=== Västerbotten ===
Location	Turnout	Share	Votes	S	M	C	FP	V	MP	KDS	NyD	Other	Left	Right
Bjurholm	87.5	1.2	1,978	39.1	15.3	19.0	12.3	2.9	3.7	7.2	0.4	0.1	45.8	53.7
Dorotea	85.4	1.4	2,374	62.5	7.6	11.8	6.2	5.7	3.7	1.8	0.2	0.6	71.8	27.4
Lycksele	85.0	5.4	8,917	55.4	9.5	5.7	8.5	6.9	4.1	8.7	0.4	0.8	66.4	32.4
Malå	85.2	1.5	2,577	57.0	8.7	6.4	6.8	12.0	3.2	4.2	0.1	1.7	72.2	26.0
Nordmaling	86.4	3.1	5,149	51.2	12.5	14.0	6.6	4.7	3.7	6.1	0.5	0.6	59.6	39.2
Norsjö	85.7	2.0	3,355	54.1	6.6	13.2	7.0	8.8	4.0	5.2	0.2	0.7	66.9	32.1
Robertsfors	87.4	2.9	4,857	42.5	9.5	23.1	7.7	4.9	4.7	6.5	0.3	0.8	52.1	46.8
Skellefteå	88.0	30.1	50,073	57.1	8.9	9.6	6.9	7.4	4.7	4.6	0.3	0.4	69.2	30.0
Sorsele	78.6	1.3	2,102	49.6	9.9	11.6	6.1	5.9	6.1	7.5	0.9	2.2	61.7	35.2
Storuman	82.6	2.9	4,769	48.0	13.4	9.4	7.2	5.9	6.3	7.8	0.6	1.4	60.2	37.7
Umeå	87.9	37.6	62,484	48.4	13.8	6.9	9.6	8.1	7.8	4.3	0.5	0.8	64.2	34.5
Vilhelmina	84.7	3.2	5,365	56.7	6.8	8.4	8.3	7.1	5.0	5.9	0.8	1.0	68.8	29.5
Vindeln	84.1	2.5	4,162	43.5	13.1	16.1	9.3	4.0	5.6	7.1	0.4	0.9	53.1	45.6
Vännäs	86.0	3.3	5,481	50.4	9.7	15.1	6.1	7.2	5.1	4.9	0.6	0.9	62.8	35.8
Åsele	85.1	1.6	2,705	59.9	8.1	12.6	4.7	5.1	4.1	4.4	0.7	0.5	69.1	29.8
Total	87.0	3.0	166,348	52.0	11.1	9.4	8.1	7.3	5.8	5.0	0.5	0.7	65.2	33.6
Source: SCB

=== Västernorrland ===
Location	Turnout	Share	Votes	S	M	C	FP	V	MP	KDS	NyD	Other	Left	Right
Härnösand	86.8	10.6	18,355	45.0	19.4	10.9	6.2	6.5	6.6	3.8	0.9	0.7	58.1	40.3
Kramfors	87.9	9.4	16,233	57.3	10.6	13.1	2.9	7.8	4.2	3.5	0.3	0.3	69.3	30.2
Sollefteå	87.5	9.5	16,402	61.1	10.6	9.3	3.3	7.1	4.8	2.8	0.5	0.4	73.0	26.0
Sundsvall	86.4	36.0	62,272	53.4	14.9	6.6	7.9	7.2	5.2	3.1	0.9	0.8	65.7	32.5
Timrå	87.0	7.1	12,338	62.6	7.8	7.6	5.0	9.1	3.6	2.8	0.8	0.8	75.3	23.1
Ånge	84.8	4.7	8,138	55.9	9.6	12.6	3.1	8.7	6.5	2.3	0.7	0.7	71.1	27.6
Örnsköldsvik	88.3	22.8	39,472	56.2	11.3	10.7	6.3	4.4	3.8	6.3	0.4	0.5	64.4	34.6
Total	87.1	3.1	173,210	55.0	13.0	9.2	6.0	6.7	4.8	3.9	0.7	0.7	66.6	32.1
Source: SCB

=== Västmanland ===
Location	Turnout	Share	Votes	S	M	C	FP	V	MP	KDS	NyD	Other	Left	Right
Arboga	87.0	5.8	9,510	50.9	17.5	7.1	6.6	6.7	5.7	3.5	1.0	1.1	63.3	34.6
Fagersta	86.1	5.3	8,671	61.0	14.3	4.0	5.4	7.2	3.6	2.3	1.1	1.3	71.7	25.9
Hallstahammar	86.5	6.0	9,938	61.3	12.6	4.3	5.1	8.5	3.3	2.3	1.3	1.4	73.0	24.3
Heby	86.1	5.3	8,653	46.1	14.6	18.6	4.2	5.3	5.4	4.6	1.0	0.3	56.8	42.0
Kungsör	87.3	3.3	5,377	49.0	18.2	8.9	6.0	7.2	5.4	2.8	1.4	1.1	61.6	35.9
Köping	86.0	9.9	16,328	54.1	15.4	7.2	5.1	8.5	3.9	3.5	0.9	1.5	66.5	31.1
Norberg	87.6	2.5	4,157	56.7	12.6	6.1	4.1	12.3	4.5	2.2	0.9	0.7	73.4	25.0
Sala	86.3	8.6	14,124	43.8	18.3	14.5	6.2	4.7	6.4	4.1	1.1	1.0	54.9	43.0
Skinnskatteberg	87.2	2.0	3,210	60.2	11.1	7.7	3.6	7.8	5.0	3.1	0.5	1.0	73.1	25.5
Surahammar	87.6	4.1	6,738	62.7	10.9	3.2	5.1	9.4	4.1	2.2	1.4	1.2	76.2	21.3
Västerås	86.5	47.2	77,600	48.7	23.3	3.2	9.3	5.1	4.6	3.5	1.3	0.9	58.4	39.3
Total	86.5	3.0	164,306	51.2	19.0	6.0	7.2	6.3	4.7	3.3	1.2	1.0	62.2	35.6
Source: SCB

=== Västra Götaland ===
Västra Götaland did have three different counties at the time. Those were Göteborg och Bohuslän, Skaraborg and Älvsborg. There were five constituencies, namely two for Göteborg och Bohuslän, one for Skaraborg and two for Älvsborg.

==== Bohuslän ====
Location	Turnout	Share	Votes	S	M	C	FP	V	MP	KDS	NyD	Other	Left	Right
Härryda	89.5	8.7	17,513	39.9	25.2	5.7	10.5	5.9	6.2	4.3	1.7	0.5	52.1	45.8
Kungälv	90.0	11.6	23,313	42.7	22.6	8.6	8.0	6.1	5.3	4.9	1.3	0.6	54.0	44.1
Lysekil	89.0	5.0	10,083	55.0	16.1	5.1	8.5	6.1	5.1	2.5	1.2	0.5	66.2	32.2
Munkedal	85.6	3.5	6,965	44.9	16.7	15.9	4.7	5.2	6.3	4.2	1.3	0.8	56.3	41.5
Mölndal	88.1	16.8	33,947	42.2	24.0	4.6	10.9	6.5	4.9	4.5	1.5	0.9	53.6	43.9
Orust	87.3	4.8	9,616	39.8	21.6	12.2	8.4	6.2	6.0	3.6	1.8	0.5	52.0	45.8
Partille	88.3	9.9	20,004	39.7	25.9	3.6	11.0	6.7	5.2	5.4	1.7	0.6	51.7	46.0
Sotenäs	86.7	3.2	6,441	46.3	22.2	6.6	9.8	4.2	5.5	4.1	1.0	0.3	56.0	42.8
Stenungsund	87.3	6.0	12,167	41.8	23.6	7.5	9.2	5.2	6.0	4.2	1.6	0.9	53.0	44.5
Strömstad	83.8	3.2	6,378	44.1	19.1	13.5	6.8	4.9	6.3	3.2	1.6	0.4	55.3	42.6
Tanum	83.7	3.8	7,582	32.0	22.7	19.7	8.3	4.0	7.7	3.2	1.8	0.6	43.7	53.9
Tjörn	87.3	4.5	9,081	33.5	26.8	6.1	10.6	3.7	5.2	11.1	2.6	0.6	42.3	54.5
Uddevalla	87.0	15.5	31,259	49.7	17.3	6.8	6.5	6.8	5.7	4.2	1.5	1.5	62.2	34.9
Öckerö	89.0	3.7	7,395	33.8	24.8	3.2	8.8	4.4	5.1	17.9	1.3	0.6	43.3	54.8
Total	87.8	3.6	201,744	42.7	22.2	7.3	9.0	5.9	5.6	5.1	1.5	0.8	54.1	43.5
Source: SCB

==== Gothenburg ====
Location	Turnout	Share	Votes	S	M	C	FP	V	MP	KDS	NyD	Other	Left	Right
Gothenburg	85.3	100.0	271,830	40.2	25.5	2.9	9.6	8.8	6.0	4.3	1.6	1.1	54.9	42.4
Total	85.3	4.9	271,830	40.2	25.5	2.9	9.6	8.8	6.0	4.3	1.6	1.1	54.9	42.4
Source: SCB

==== Skaraborg ====
Location	Turnout	Share	Votes	S	M	C	FP	V	MP	KDS	NyD	Other	Left	Right
Essunga	86.1	2.1	3,813	32.4	24.4	23.0	5.3	3.6	4.5	4.4	2.1	0.3	40.5	57.1
Falköping	87.0	11.7	20,877	38.7	21.7	15.3	4.8	5.3	5.8	6.6	1.2	0.5	49.8	48.5
Grästorp	87.0	2.2	3,948	33.4	26.0	19.5	4.4	4.4	5.6	4.4	1.8	0.4	43.4	54.4
Gullspång	86.1	2.3	4,057	47.1	17.3	12.4	3.7	6.2	5.5	5.4	1.3	0.9	58.9	38.8
Götene	88.9	4.9	8,847	42.3	18.0	13.0	6.3	5.5	5.5	6.9	2.0	0.5	53.4	44.1
Habo	89.5	3.3	5,819	36.7	22.3	10.3	6.2	3.9	4.7	12.9	1.7	1.3	45.5	51.7
Hjo	86.2	3.3	5,877	41.1	22.5	10.4	6.6	4.7	5.4	7.2	1.3	0.8	51.2	46.8
Karlsborg	88.7	2.9	5,173	46.8	19.7	11.5	5.1	4.7	5.2	4.3	2.1	0.4	56.8	40.7
Lidköping	87.8	13.4	24,014	45.9	18.5	10.7	6.5	7.1	5.1	4.7	1.2	0.4	58.1	40.3
Mariestad	86.2	8.9	16,013	46.3	19.8	8.2	5.4	7.2	5.5	5.1	1.8	0.8	59.0	38.5
Mullsjö	91.5	2.6	4,630	36.9	19.4	10.2	5.7	4.7	6.3	14.6	1.3	0.9	47.9	49.9
Skara	86.8	6.7	11,984	42.9	21.7	11.4	5.6	4.9	6.3	4.2	2.6	0.3	54.1	43.0
Skövde	87.3	17.3	31,015	44.3	22.0	9.6	7.1	5.3	4.9	4.7	1.3	0.8	54.4	43.5
Tibro	87.6	4.0	7,200	44.4	17.9	10.1	7.9	5.1	4.3	7.8	1.6	0.8	53.9	43.8
Tidaholm	88.8	4.9	8,707	51.4	14.9	10.8	6.0	5.8	3.7	5.1	1.6	0.8	60.9	36.8
Töreboda	84.2	3.6	6,396	40.9	19.5	18.4	3.3	5.8	5.1	5.1	1.4	0.5	51.8	46.3
Vara	85.3	6.0	10,656	31.9	26.1	21.2	5.1	3.7	5.1	4.7	1.9	0.4	40.6	57.0
Total	87.2	3.2	179,026	42.4	20.6	12.4	5.9	5.5	5.2	5.8	1.6	0.6	53.1	44.7
Source: SCB

==== Älvsborg N ====
Location	Turnout	Share	Votes	S	M	C	FP	V	MP	KDS	NyD	Other	Left	Right
Ale	88.8	9.4	15,695	49.9	17.2	7.6	6.2	7.8	4.8	4.1	1.6	0.8	62.5	35.1
Alingsås	89.3	13.4	22,425	40.5	20.2	7.8	8.8	6.3	6.9	7.6	1.3	0.6	53.7	44.4
Bengtsfors	84.3	4.3	7,243	48.2	16.8	13.9	5.6	4.7	4.3	5.4	0.9	0.3	57.2	41.7
Dals-Ed	83.2	1.9	3,203	36.3	17.0	20.2	4.8	3.7	7.7	8.9	0.7	0.7	47.7	50.9
Färgelanda	86.9	2.8	4,672	42.9	15.7	22.0	5.7	4.2	4.7	3.5	1.1	0.3	51.7	46.8
Herrljunga	89.3	3.8	6,302	35.1	19.0	19.8	6.2	4.6	5.9	7.9	1.2	0.4	45.6	52.8
Lerum	90.8	12.9	21,502	36.9	27.0	5.4	10.3	5.8	6.9	5.5	1.6	0.5	49.6	48.2
Lilla Edet	86.9	4.7	7,808	52.1	13.4	11.2	4.1	8.5	4.6	3.3	1.3	1.4	65.2	32.1
Mellerud	85.3	4.0	6,641	37.2	18.7	21.1	4.5	4.0	6.9	5.2	1.8	0.6	48.0	49.6
Trollhättan	88.0	19.6	32,726	54.4	16.6	5.8	6.9	6.5	4.9	3.1	1.0	0.9	65.8	32.3
Vårgårda	87.6	4.0	6,615	34.0	16.9	16.3	7.2	4.4	6.8	12.8	1.2	0.5	45.2	53.1
Vänersborg	86.7	14.2	23,752	46.1	17.9	10.2	7.0	6.7	5.9	4.4	1.2	0.6	58.7	39.5
Åmål	84.6	5.1	8,571	51.3	18.2	11.0	5.3	4.8	4.3	3.8	0.9	0.4	60.4	38.3
Total	87.8	3.0	167,155	45.2	18.8	9.9	7.1	6.1	5.7	5.2	1.2	0.7	57.1	41.0
Source: SCB

==== Älvsborg S ====
Location	Turnout	Share	Votes	S	M	C	FP	V	MP	KDS	NyD	Other	Left	Right
Bollebygd	90.2	4.4	5,145	43.2	23.3	10.6	5.2	4.9	5.4	5.4	1.2	0.6	53.6	44.6
Borås	87.8	52.0	61,350	48.3	22.1	6.6	6.7	5.7	4.9	4.1	1.1	0.4	58.8	39.6
Mark	89.1	18.2	21,517	48.6	17.5	13.3	4.4	5.5	4.6	4.7	0.8	0.5	58.8	39.9
Svenljunga	86.7	6.0	7,024	40.0	21.8	18.5	6.2	3.0	5.0	4.2	1.0	0.3	48.0	50.7
Tranemo	89.8	6.8	7,960	42.2	20.5	18.6	5.8	2.8	4.7	4.0	1.1	0.2	49.8	48.9
Ulricehamn	88.3	12.7	14,922	35.4	21.9	16.8	6.9	4.0	7.0	6.3	1.3	0.4	46.3	51.9
Total	88.2	2.1	117,918	45.6	21.2	10.8	6.1	5.1	5.1	4.6	1.1	0.4	55.8	42.7
Source: SCB

=== Örebro ===
Location	Turnout	Share	Votes	S	M	C	FP	V	MP	KDS	NyD	Other	Left	Right
Askersund	87.3	4.5	7,957	52.4	14.9	11.0	5.5	5.6	3.9	5.4	0.8	0.5	61.9	36.8
Degerfors	89.3	4.3	7,608	63.8	8.8	5.9	4.4	9.9	3.2	2.8	1.0	0.4	76.8	21.8
Hallsberg	88.4	6.1	10,820	55.3	12.3	8.6	5.9	7.1	3.9	5.1	1.0	0.8	66.3	31.9
Hällefors	85.2	3.2	5,759	64.5	9.9	5.4	4.0	9.0	4.4	1.9	0.6	0.3	78.0	21.2
Karlskoga	86.3	12.2	21,815	56.5	18.3	3.7	5.8	7.4	3.4	2.9	1.6	0.4	67.2	30.7
Kumla	87.8	6.8	12,127	50.9	14.5	8.0	6.8	7.3	4.0	6.5	1.4	0.7	62.1	35.8
Laxå	86.2	2.6	4,565	58.0	11.2	7.8	5.8	5.8	4.1	6.0	0.5	0.8	67.9	30.8
Lekeberg	87.2	2.5	4,517	39.3	16.8	18.1	5.3	5.0	5.3	8.3	1.4	0.5	49.7	48.5
Lindesberg	86.9	9.0	16,006	50.4	15.0	11.4	5.6	7.0	5.1	4.3	0.7	0.5	62.5	36.3
Ljusnarsberg	84.7	2.3	4,102	56.3	10.8	7.9	4.1	12.3	4.3	2.2	1.5	0.6	72.9	25.0
Nora	86.5	3.8	6,754	50.4	16.2	7.8	7.3	7.0	5.4	4.2	1.1	0.5	62.9	35.6
Örebro	87.6	42.9	76,606	46.2	18.7	5.3	9.7	6.7	5.2	5.8	1.4	1.1	58.1	39.5
Total	87.2	3.2	178,636	50.8	16.3	6.9	7.4	7.1	4.6	5.0	1.2	0.8	62.5	35.5
Source: SCB

=== Östergötland ===
Location	Turnout	Share	Votes	S	M	C	FP	V	MP	KDS	NyD	Other	Left	Right
Boxholm	89.6	1.4	3,758	54.2	11.0	13.1	3.7	6.7	4.7	5.1	0.9	0.6	65.6	32.9
Finspång	89.3	5.7	15,081	55.1	14.1	6.9	4.9	7.4	4.3	5.2	1.2	0.9	66.8	31.1
Kinda	86.6	2.5	6,742	39.5	17.3	19.7	4.5	3.9	5.7	7.7	1.1	0.5	49.0	49.3
Linköping	88.7	32.1	85,519	40.3	24.7	6.5	9.7	5.5	5.4	5.5	1.4	1.0	51.2	46.4
Mjölby	87.4	6.3	16,912	49.8	18.2	10.3	5.7	5.5	4.2	4.6	1.1	0.6	59.6	38.8
Motala	87.4	10.2	27,184	55.5	16.2	6.5	6.0	5.8	4.8	3.7	1.0	0.5	66.1	32.4
Norrköping	85.9	28.6	76,299	47.1	24.3	4.8	5.3	5.9	5.1	3.8	1.9	1.7	58.1	38.3
Söderköping	87.5	3.3	8,711	38.7	25.6	13.9	4.7	3.8	5.9	4.5	1.8	1.2	48.4	48.7
Vadstena	89.9	2.0	5,259	46.6	21.3	10.0	6.5	3.8	5.6	4.9	0.9	0.4	56.0	42.7
Valdemarsvik	87.9	2.2	5,817	47.8	18.0	15.4	2.9	3.6	4.7	4.5	1.5	1.6	56.1	40.8
Ydre	89.3	1.1	2,800	33.4	16.5	23.4	5.5	3.5	5.8	10.5	0.7	0.8	42.6	55.9
Åtvidaberg	89.5	3.2	8,477	54.3	15.1	10.8	4.8	4.6	4.4	4.2	0.7	1.1	63.3	34.9
Ödeshög	88.9	1.5	3,897	41.1	19.3	16.7	4.3	3.4	5.6	7.9	0.9	0.8	50.1	48.2
Total	87.7	4.8	266,456	46.1	21.7	7.7	6.7	5.5	5.1	4.8	1.4	1.1	56.6	40.8
Source: SCB
