= 1998 Swedish general election =

- 20 September 1998

All 349 seats in the Riksdag 175 seats needed for a majority
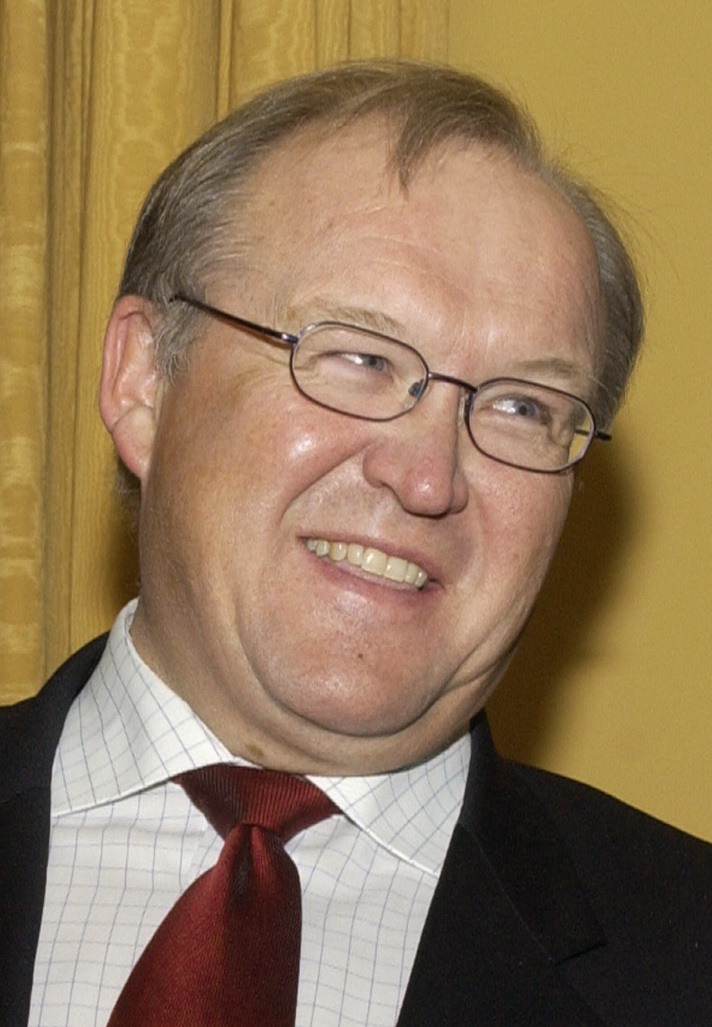

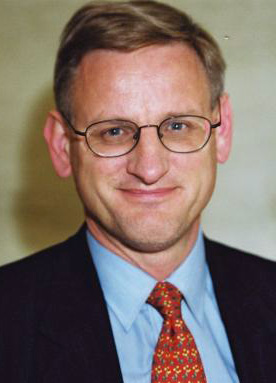

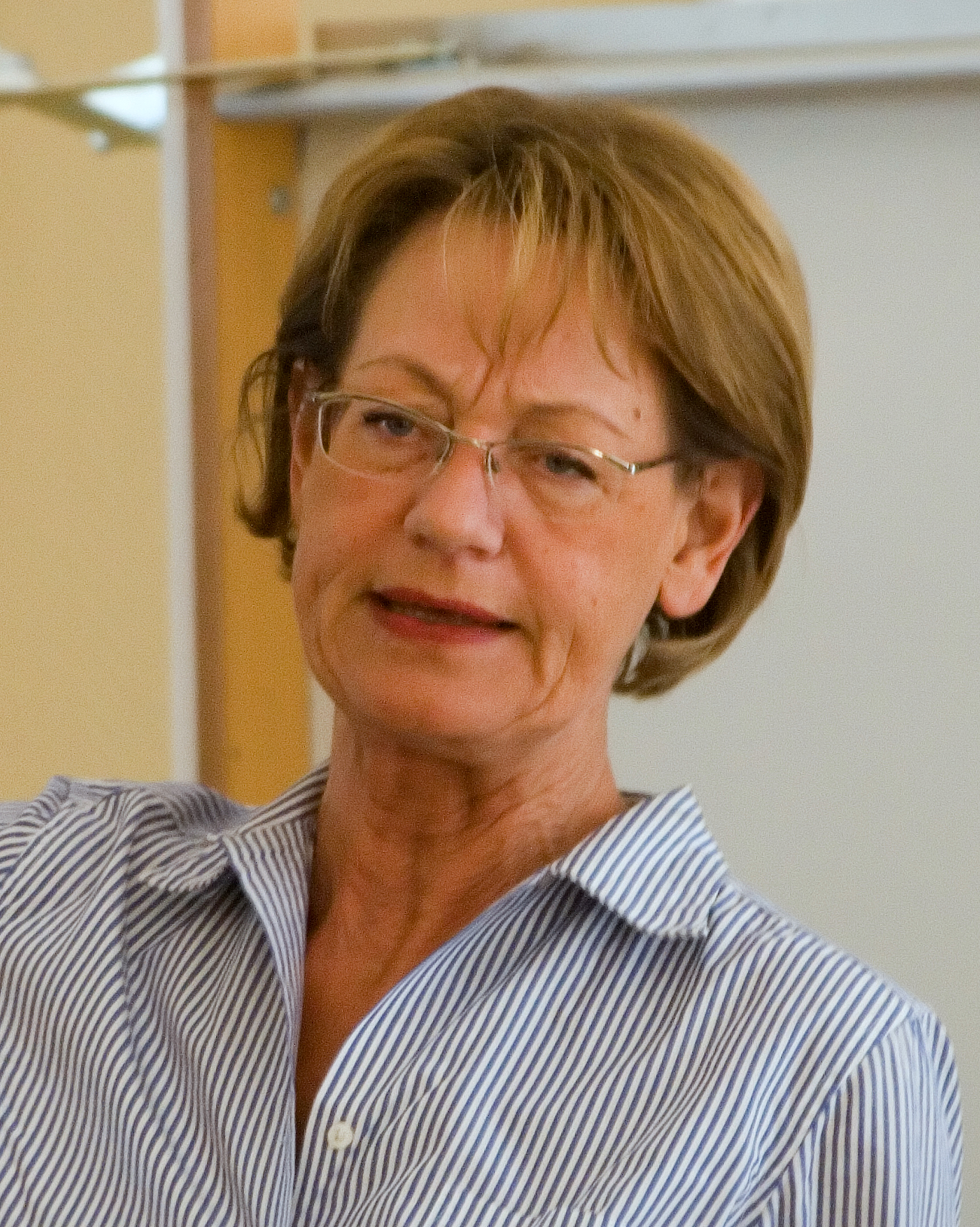

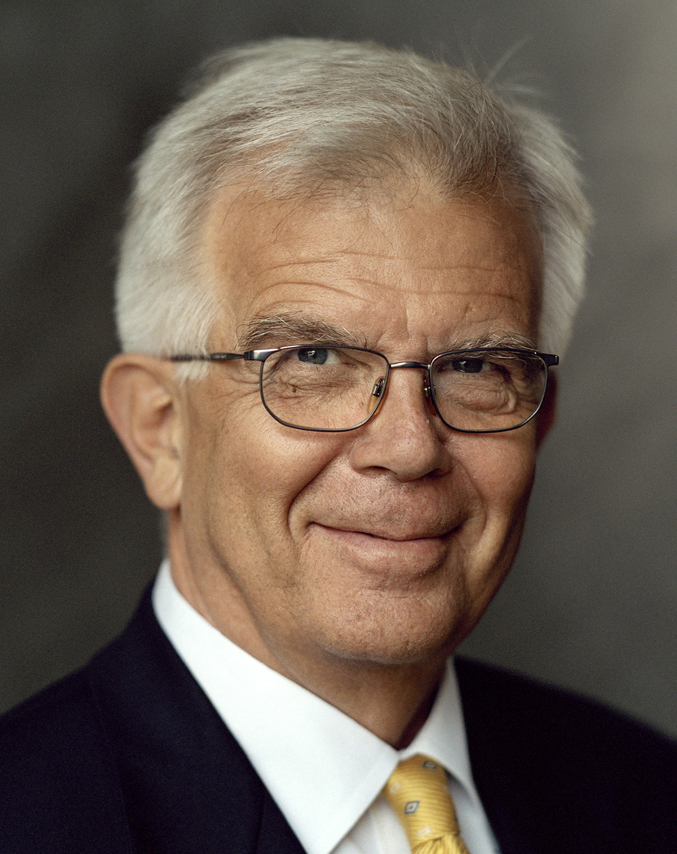

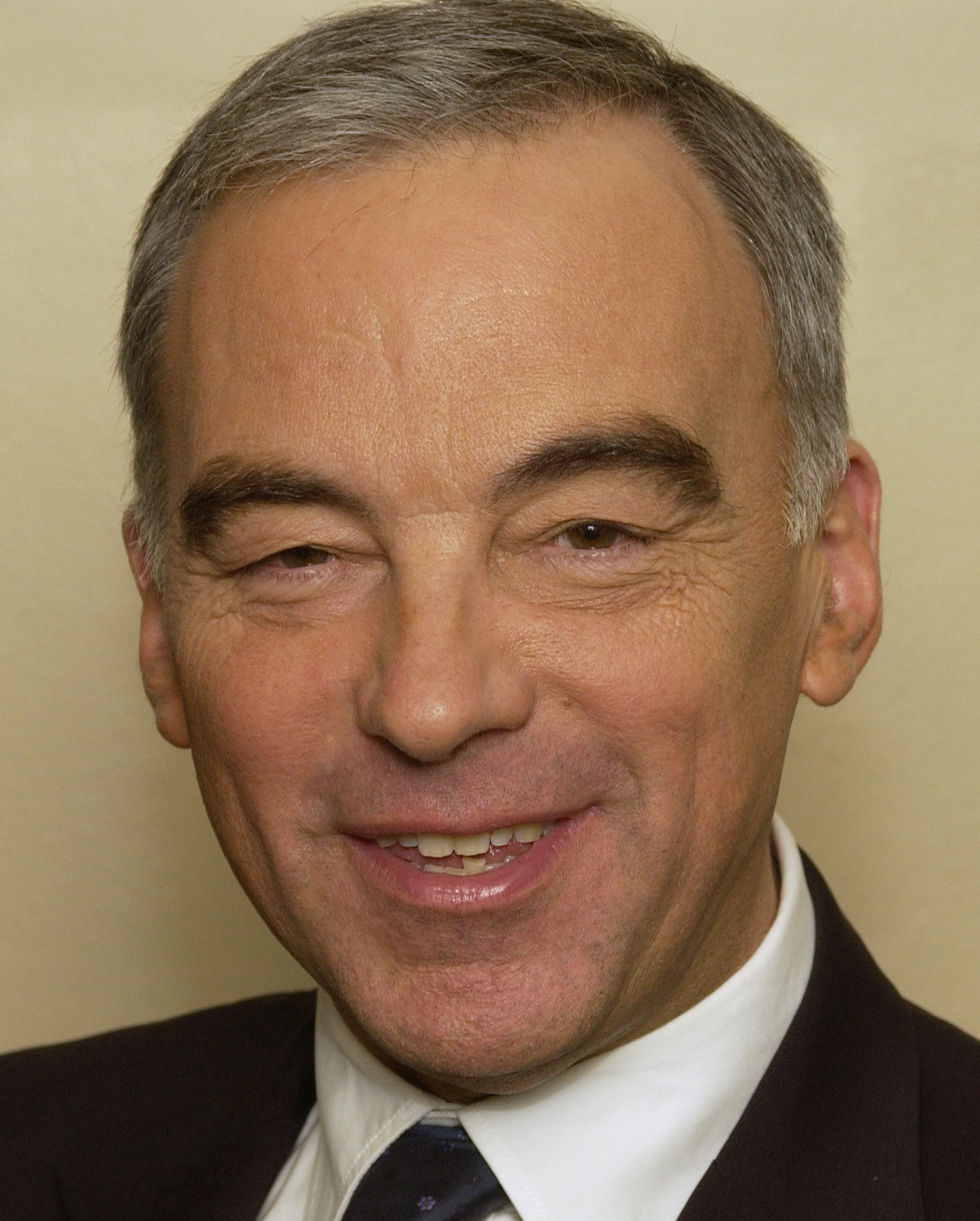

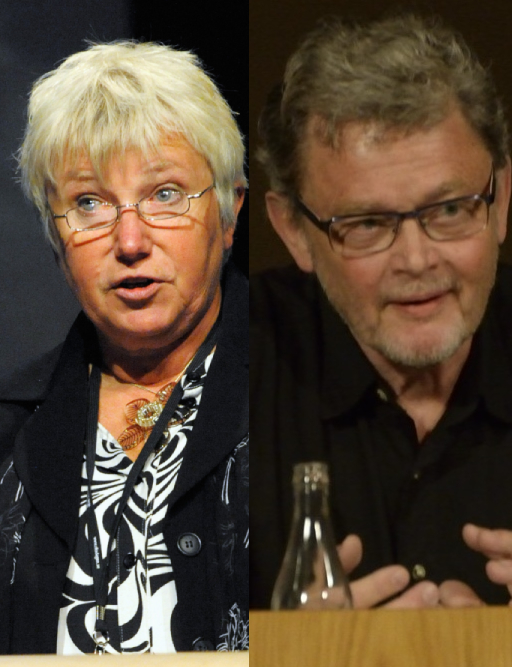
	First party	Second party	Third party
Leader	Göran Persson	Carl Bildt	Gudrun Schyman
Party	Social Democrats	Moderate	Left
Last election	161	80	22
Seats won	131	82	43
Seat change	▼30	▲2	▲21
Popular vote	1,914,426	1,204,926	631,011
Percentage	36.40%	22.91%	12.00%
Swing	▼8.85 pp	▲0.53 pp	▲5.83 pp
	Fourth party	Fifth party	Sixth party
Leader	Alf Svensson	Lennart Daléus	Lars Leijonborg
Party	Christian Democrats	Centre	Liberal People's
Last election	15	27	26
Seats won	42	18	17
Seat change	▲27	▼9	▼9
Popular vote	619,046	269,762	248,076
Percentage	11.75%	5.13%	4.72%
Swing	▲7.68 pp	▼2.52 pp	▼2.47 pp
	Seventh party
Leader	Marianne Samuelsson; Birger Schlaug
Party	Green
Last election	18
Seats won	16
Seat change	▼2
Popular vote	236,699
Percentage	4.50%
Swing	▼0.52 pp
- Map of the election, showing the distribution of constituency and levelling seats, as well as the largest political bloc within each constituency.
PM before election
Göran Persson
Social Democrats
Elected PM
Göran Persson
Social Democrats

General elections were held in Sweden on 20 September 1998. The Swedish Social Democratic Party remained the largest party in the Riksdag, winning 131 of the 349 seats.

The incumbent Social Democratic minority government, led by Göran Persson, was returned to power despite losing seats and receiving fewer votes than in their 1991 defeat. They remained in power with support from the Left Party and the Green Party. While the three left-wing parties saw a net loss of 11 seats, the Left Party nearly doubled its representation in the Riksdag. This reflected how many Social Democratic voters were dissatisfied with the policies of the government, which had implemented austerity measures to reduce the budget deficit.

The Social Democrats were able to form a government in spite of the sizeable decline of the vote, since the centre-right parties failed to recover more than a net share of 11 seats out of the required 27. The most notable gain was that the capital Stockholm going blue in spite of a stable nationwide left-leaning majority, something that previously had been unlikely. In suburban areas around the two largest cities several municipalities also flipped blue. Other gains were in the blue heartlands of Southern Sweden, with Jönköping and Linköping being major pickups. Even so, 23 out of 29 constituencies voted for the leftist parties. Gothenburg remained in the red column in spite of a large net swing towards the opposition.

Even so, smaller municipalities away from the bigger cities gave the red-green bloc a sizeable edge, with the Left Party getting into double-digits nationwide. Even though there was a drop of support in major cities, many areas that had previously voted blue remained with the red-green bloc. For the Social Democrats, the steep drop of the party's nationwide vote share was still felt in many of its historically strong industrial areas. The party's vote share had dropped to a 70-year low and many absolute majorities from 1994 election were lost.

Besides from the Left Party, the other party that made major gains were the Christian Democrats. The party had been on the verge of falling out of the Riksdag in 1994, yet almost tripled its vote share to end up at 11.8%, even being the largest centre-right party in its stronghold of Jönköping County. The former heads of government, the Centre Party, continued its decline and recorded 5.1% of the vote, more than a million fewer overall votes than in the 1970s elections. The People's Party fared even worse at 4.7%.

== Debates ==
1998 Swedish general election debates
Date	Time	Organizers	Moderators	P Present I Invitee N Non-invitee							
Date	Time	Organizers	Moderators	S	M	C	L	V	MP	KD	Refs
		Sveriges Television	Claes Elfsberg; Inga-Lill Usterud	P Göran Persson	P Carl Bildt	P Lennart Daléus	P Lars Leijonborg	P Gudrun Schyman	P Birger Schlaug	P Alf Svensson	

== Results ==
There were 5,261,109 valid ballots cast, a sizeable decrease in turnout from the 1994 election, with turnout dropping from 86.8% to 81.4%.

Party	Votes	%	Seats	+/–
Swedish Social Democratic Party	1,914,426	36.40	131	–30
Moderate Party	1,204,926	22.91	82	+2
Left Party	631,011	12.00	43	+21
Christian Democrats	618,033	11.75	42	+27
Centre Party	269,762	5.13	18	–9
Liberal People's Party	248,076	4.72	17	–9
Green Party	236,699	4.50	16	–2
Swedish Senior Citizen Interest Party	52,869	1.01	0	0
The New Party	25,276	0.48	0	0
Sweden Democrats	19,624	0.37	0	0
New Future	9,171	0.17	0	0
New Democracy	8,297	0.16	0	0
Senior Citizen Party	6,865	0.13	0	0
Socialist Justice Party	3,044	0.06	0	0
Communist Party	1,868	0.04	0	0
Unity	1,725	0.03	0	0
Socialist Party	1,466	0.03	0	0
Other parties	6,971	0.13	0	0
Total	5,260,109	100.00	349	0
Valid votes	5,260,109	97.89		
Invalid/blank votes	113,466	2.11		
Total votes	5,373,575	100.00		
Registered voters/turnout	6,603,129	81.38		
Source: Statistical Central Bureau

=== Seat distribution ===
Constituency	Total seats	Seats won								
Constituency	Total seats	By party							By coalition	
Constituency	Total seats	S	M	V	KD	C	F	MP	Red-green	Right
Blekinge	6	3	1	1	1				4	2
Dalarna	11	4	2	2	1	1		1	7	4
Gävleborg	12	5	2	2	1	1		1	8	4
Gothenburg	17	5	5	3	2		1	1	9	8
Gotland	2	1	1						1	1
Halland	12	4	3	1	2	1	1		5	7
Jämtland	5	2	1	1		1			3	2
Jönköping	13	5	2	1	3	1		1	7	6
Kalmar	9	4	2	1	1	1			5	4
Kronoberg	7	3	1	1	1	1			4	3
Malmö	9	4	3	1	1				5	4
Norrbotten	9	5	1	2	1				7	2
Örebro	13	5	2	2	1	1	1	1	8	5
Östergötland	17	6	4	2	2	1	1	1	9	8
Skåne North and East	12	4	3	1	2	1	1		5	7
Skåne South	13	5	4	1	1		1	1	7	6
Skåne West	9	4	3	1	1				5	4
Södermanland	10	5	2	1	1			1	7	3
Stockholm County	38	11	13	3	5	1	3	2	16	22
Stockholm Municipality	28	7	10	4	3		2	2	13	15
Uppsala	12	4	3	1	1	1	1	1	6	6
Värmland	12	5	2	2	1	1	1		7	5
Västerbotten	12	5	1	2	1	1	1	1	8	4
Västernorrland	10	5	1	2	1	1			7	3
Västmanland	10	5	2	1	1		1		6	4
Västra Götaland East	10	4	2	1	2	1			5	5
Västra Götaland North	12	4	2	1	2	1	1	1	6	6
Västra Götaland South	6	3	1	1	1				4	2
Västra Götaland West	13	4	3	1	2	1	1	1	6	7
Total	349	131	82	43	42	18	17	16	190	159
Source: Statistics Sweden

=== By municipality ===
Votes by municipality. The municipalities are the color of the party that got the most votes within the coalition that won relative majority.

Cartogram of the map to the left with each municipality rescaled to the number of valid votes cast.

Map showing the voting shifts from the 1994 to the 1998 election. Darker blue indicates a municipality voted more towards the parties that formed the centre-right bloc. Darker red indicates a municipality voted more towards the parties that form the left-wing bloc.

Votes by municipality as a scale from red/Left-wing bloc to blue/Centre-right bloc.

Cartogram of vote with each municipality rescaled in proportion to number of valid votes cast. Deeper blue represents a relative majority for the centre-right coalition, brighter red represents a relative majority for the left-wing coalition.
