= Listed buildings in Örebro County =

There are 54 listed buildings (Swedish: byggnadsminne) in Örebro County.

== Askersund Municipality ==
Image	Name	Premise	Number of buildings	Year built	Architect	Coordinates	ID
	Igelbäckens masugn	Algrenamarken 1:15, 1:33	3				21300000014413
	Kullängsstugan	Kullängen 1:2	1				21300000014411
	Stjernsunds slott med park	Stjärnsund 7:1	15				21300000014554
	Trehörnings masugn	Önnabo 2:2	6				21300000014452

== Degerfors Municipality ==
placeholder

== Hallsberg Municipality ==
placeholder

== Hällefors Municipality ==
placeholder

== Karlskoga Municipality ==
placeholder

== Kumla Municipality ==
placeholder

== Laxå Municipality ==
placeholder

== Lekeberg Municipality ==
placeholder

== Lindesberg Municipality ==
placeholder

== Ljusnarsberg Municipality ==
placeholder

== Nora Municipality ==
placeholder

== Örebro Municipality ==
placeholder
