= Lanna, Lekeberg =

Lanna
- Location within Örebro Location within Sweden
- Coordinates: 59°14′N 14°55′E
- Country: Sweden
- Province: Närke
- County: Örebro County
- Municipality: Lekeberg Municipality and Örebro Municipality

Area
  - Total: 1.11 km^{2} (0.43 sq mi)

Population (31 December 2010)
  - Total: 537
  - Density: 482/km^{2} (1,250/sq mi)
- Time zone: UTC+1 (CET)
  - Summer (DST): UTC+2 (CEST)

Lanna is a bimunicipal locality situated in Lekeberg Municipality and Örebro Municipality in Örebro County, Sweden with 537 inhabitants in 2010.
