= Johan Gottschalk Wallerius =

Swedish chemist and mineralogist

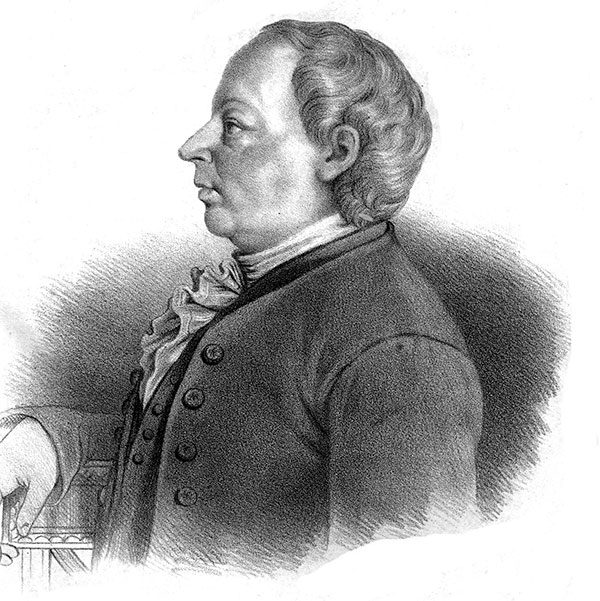
Johan Gottschalk Wallerius

Johan Gottschalk Wallerius (11 July 1709 – 16 November 1785) was a Swedish chemist and mineralogist.

== Biography ==
Wallerius was born at Stora Mellösa in Närke (now Örebro County), Sweden. He was a son of provost Erik Nilsson Wallerius and his spouse Elisabeth Tranæa. He was a younger brother to the physicist, philosopher and theologian Nils Wallerius (1706–1764).

Johan Gottschalk entered Uppsala University in 1725, and graduated as magister in 1731 after studies of mathematics, physics and medicine. He continued his studies at Lund University, where he received his Doctor of Medicine degree in 1735. After this graduation, he came back to Uppsala where he opened a course in chemistry in his laboratory. This course allowed students in pharmacy and chemistry to witness demonstrations and practice themselves with the experiments. The popularity of this teaching allowed Wallerius to become adjunct of medicine at Uppsala University in 1741 and the first holder of a new professorship of chemistry, medicine and pharmacy in 1750. The same year, Wallerius was elected member of the Royal Swedish Academy of Sciences. He retired from the chemistry chair in 1767 and was succeeded by his student Torbern Bergman (1735–1784).

Wallerius is regarded as the founder of agricultural chemistry, mainly based on the significance of his widely disseminated work Agriculturae fundamenta chemica (1761, published in Swedish the same year as Åkerbrukets chemiska grunder and later translated into many other languages). He published several other studies on chemical, mineralogical and geological subjects and used his own farm Hagelstena in Alsike (south of Uppsala) as an experimental field. He spent his early retirement from the University due to poor health applying the principles of chemistry as a way to improve agriculture in his own farm, and published some of his findings in Rön, rörande landtbruket. Om svenska åkerjordartenas egenskaper och skiljemerken samt deras förbättring genom tienlig jordblanning, which was awarded the prize of the Royal Swedish Academy of Sciences.

== Other sources ==
- Nordisk familjebok, 2nd ed., vol. 31, col. 498f
- Hjalmar F. Mutual Favours: The social and scientific practice of eighteenth-century Swedish chemistry. Uppsala: Uppsala universitet, 2003. 225 p. (Skrifter; 30)
