= Nils Wallerius =

Swedish physicist, philosopher and theologian

Nils Wallerius (1 January 1706 – 16 August 1764) was a Swedish physicist, philosopher and theologian. He was one of the first scientists to investigate and document the characteristics of evaporation using modern scientific methods. He was also among the first and most notable adherents of the philosophies of German philosopher Christian Wolff (1679–1754).

== Biography ==
Nils Wallerius was born at Stora Mellösa in Örebro County, Sweden, to Provost Erik Nilsson Wallerius of Stora Mellösa and his spouse Elisabeth Tranæa. He was the brother of chemist and mineralogist Johan Gottschalk Wallerius (1709–1785). He studied philosophy and physics at the University of Uppsala, where he became professor of logic and metaphysics in 1746. In 1755, he received a professorship in theology, a position established by Bishop Andreas Kalsenius (1688-1750). His research in physics, particularly on evaporation, earned him recognition and a place as the 26th member of the Royal Swedish Academy of Sciences in 1739. Wallerius's work focuses on whether and how evaporation occurs in open or vacuumed environments, conducting experiments that ranged from observing the weight loss of an egg over an entire year or how long a cup of wine from the Rhine region evaporated, to large scale sealed copper tanks filled with various fluids observed over time. His findings, confirming evaporation in sealed environments, remain significant in various fields, especially industry.

Wallerius was a devout religious man who, while influenced by the enlightened time he was living in, viewed many of his younger colleagues' liberal beliefs as a threat to religion. After a conflict with his senior mentor Samuel Klingenstierna (1698-1765), he left the physics faculty and instead became a professor of theology, making a name for himself in theological debates as a known devoted defender of Wolffian beliefs. He spoke at least 5 languages fluently (Swedish, Latin, English, German, French) and had special permission to buy foreign literature deemed blasphemous by the Swedish church in order to study it. Wallerius actively participated in over 200 disputations both of his own works and by others where he often rhetorically attacked those who showed too much enlightened view on science and theology. When Emanuel Swedenborg was asked after the death of Nils Wallerius in 1764 what he thought the professor was doing in heaven he replied "He still goes about and holds disputations".

Wallerius was a popular lecturer, spending up to 10 hours a day teaching, and his lectures became so popular that he sometimes scheduled them at 2 AM to manage the number of attendees. During his life, he published many works in his various fields of studies. Among them is his 750-page handbook to physics Elementa physices and his 870-page study of the soul through the philosophies of Christian Wolff in Psychologia Empirica, ea continens quæ de Anima humana Indubia Experientiæ fide cognoscuntur, Methodo Scientifica Pertractata (1755).

== Other Sources ==
- Jacques, Thiel (1955). Svenska män och kvinnor: biografisk uppslagsbok. 8, Toffteen-Ö. Stockholm: Bonnier. p. 191.
- Frangsmyr, Tore, J. L. Heilbron, and Robin E. Rider, editors (1990) The Quantifying Spirit in the 18th Century (Berkeley:University of California Press) ISBN 978-0520070226
- Anna Backman, Anna 1700-talets hästvardag – praktiker och attityder speglade i två akademistallmästares manuskript (Lychnos. 1967–68)
