= Åbytorp =

- Location within Örebro Location within Sweden
- Coordinates: 59°07′N 15°04′E
- Country: Sweden
- Province: Närke
- County: Örebro County
- Municipality: Kumla Municipality

Area
  - Total: 1.14 km^{2} (0.44 sq mi)

Population (31 December 2010)
  - Total: 755
  - Density: 663/km^{2} (1,720/sq mi)
- Time zone: UTC+1 (CET)
  - Summer (DST): UTC+2 (CEST)

Åbytorp is a locality situated in Kumla Municipality, Örebro County, Sweden with 755 inhabitants in 2010.

== Riksdag elections ==
Year	%	Votes	V	S	MP	C	L	KD	M	SD	NyD	Left	Right
1973	91.7	1,214	2.4	33.9		43.8	6.5	4.6	8.6			36.2	59.0
1976	92.4	1,205	2.0	29.5		47.3	8.5	2.6	10.2			31.5	66.0
1979	91.4	1,258	3.0	33.5		37.8	7.9	2.9	14.5			36.5	60.3
1982	91.7	1,294	3.4	36.1	1.2	34.1	4.3	4.8	16.1			39.5	54.4
1985	90.4	1,312	4.3	34.0	1.1	35.7	9.4		15.5			38.3	60.5
1988	86.8	1,251	5.4	34.0	4.2	29.3	9.3	6.2	11.6			43.6	50.1
1991	87.2	1,308	3.7	30.8	1.9	21.9	4.8	11.0	16.2		9.3	34.6	46.2
1994	85.7	1,321	6.7	37.9	4.6	19.4	4.2	8.0	16.0		3.9	47.8	47.4
1998	83.1	1,278	10.5	30.8	4.4	14.8	2.6	17.4	18.0			45.7	52.7
2002	81.9	1,273	6.0	37.5	3.1	17.0	6.9	14.3	11.2	2.8		46.7	49.3
2006	82.0	1,272	4.5	35.1	3.5	18.5	5.4	11.2	16.4	4.2		43.2	51.4
2010	85.4	1,377	3.5	32.0	4.7	12.8	4.7	8.1	25.1	8.4		40.2	50.7
2014	86.3	1,407	3.6	31.3	3.7	13.0	3.6	8.3	18.6	16.3		38.6	43.5
2018	87.2	1,139	4.3	25.7	2.6	13.7	3.2	12.1	13.9	23.2		46.4	52.3
