= Hampetorp =

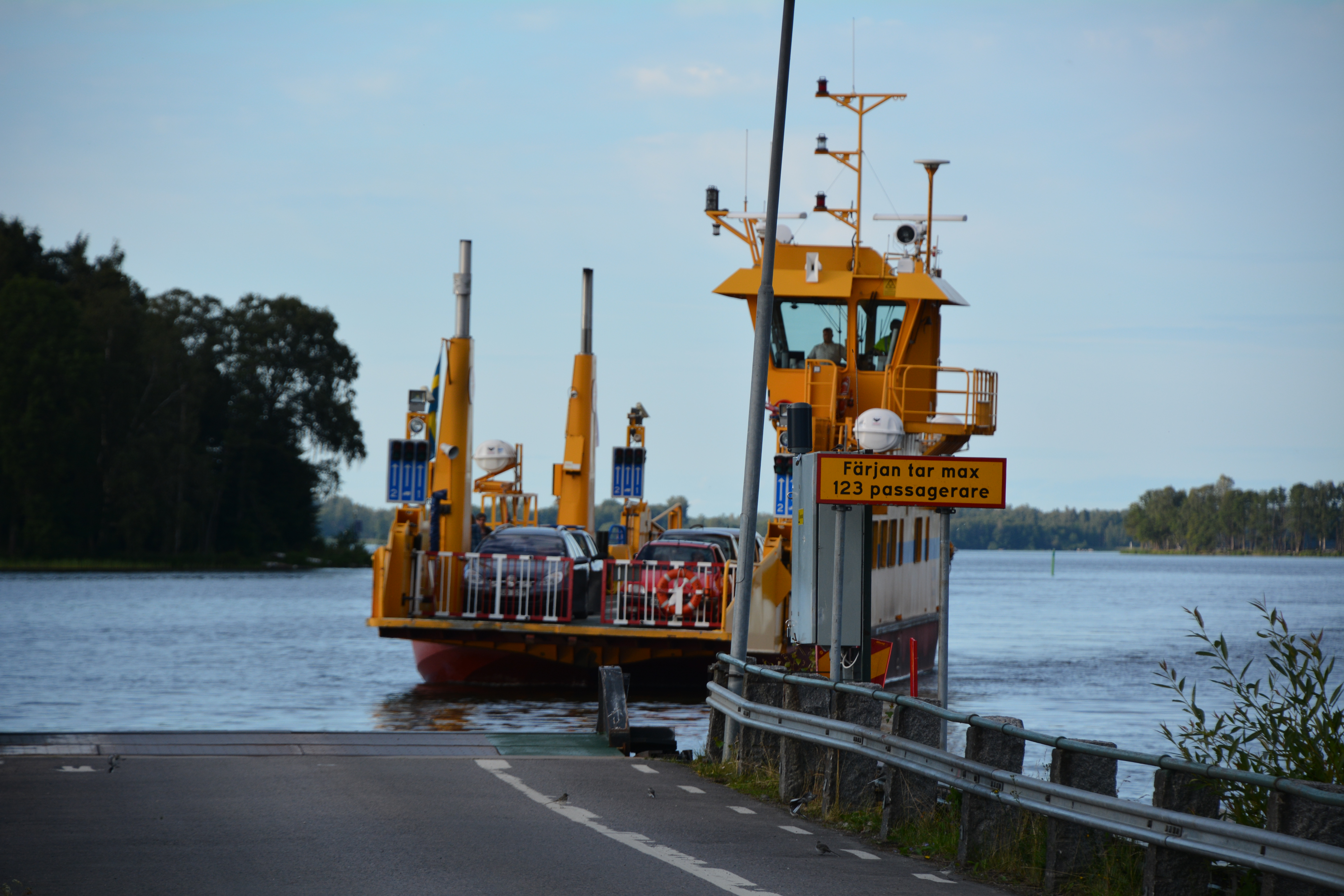
- M/S Seedna ferry between Hampetorp and the island Vinön

- Location within Örebro Location within Sweden
- Coordinates: 59°08′20″N 15°40′9″E
- Country: Sweden
- Province: Närke
- County: Örebro County
- Municipality: Örebro Municipality

Area
  - Total: 0.75 km^{2} (0.29 sq mi)

Population (31 December 2010)
  - Total: 297
  - Density: 396/km^{2} (1,030/sq mi)
- Time zone: UTC+1 (CET)
  - Summer (DST): UTC+2 (CEST)

Hampetorp is a locality situated in Örebro Municipality, Örebro County, Sweden with 297 inhabitants in 2010.

== Riksdag elections ==
Year	%	Votes	V	S	MP	C	L	KD	M	SD	NyD	Left	Right
1973	88.8	627	1.8	27.1		43.2	13.4	4.1	10.4			28.9	67.0
1976	91.5	655	0.8	25.6		46.6	9.3	4.3	13.6			26.4	69.5
1979	89.5	652	1.8	26.2		42.2	8.3	3.8	17.6			28.1	68.1
1982	88.3	661	2.9	29.8	5.0	33.9	5.3	4.5	18.6			32.7	57.8
1985	89.7	687	2.8	32.6	1.5	27.4	15.4		17.2			35.4	60.0
1988	77.3	611	2.8	35.2	6.2	22.7	11.0	6.1	15.4			44.2	49.1
1991	82.5	672	3.7	27.4	4.0	17.0	7.0	13.4	17.0		9.5	31.1	54.3
1994	82.8	649	6.0	37.4	4.9	14.6	5.1	9.9	19.9		1.2	48.4	49.5
1998	83.4	657	10.5	29.5	5.9	12.2	5.3	15.8	18.6			46.0	51.9
2002	83.6	676	6.1	32.1	4.4	14.2	10.1	16.9	14.1	2.1		42.6	55.2
2006	86.5	690	4.3	31.0	4.8	11.7	6.1	11.6	23.8	3.9		40.1	53.2
2010	89.1	743	4.0	27.5	5.0	12.9	4.3	11.0	28.5	5.9		36.5	56.8
2014	90.3	715	4.9	28.4	3.8	9.8	3.5	9.4	20.1	17.3		37.1	42.8
2018	88.5	710	6.5	22.8	2.8	12.7	2.8	9.7	15.5	25.9		44.8	53.9
