= Mullhyttan =

- Location within Örebro Location within Sweden
- Coordinates: 59°09′N 14°41′E
- Country: Sweden
- Province: Närke
- County: Örebro County
- Municipality: Lekeberg Municipality

Area
  - Total: 1.45 km^{2} (0.56 sq mi)

Population (31 December 2010)
  - Total: 503
  - Density: 346/km^{2} (900/sq mi)
- Time zone: UTC+1 (CET)
  - Summer (DST): UTC+2 (CEST)

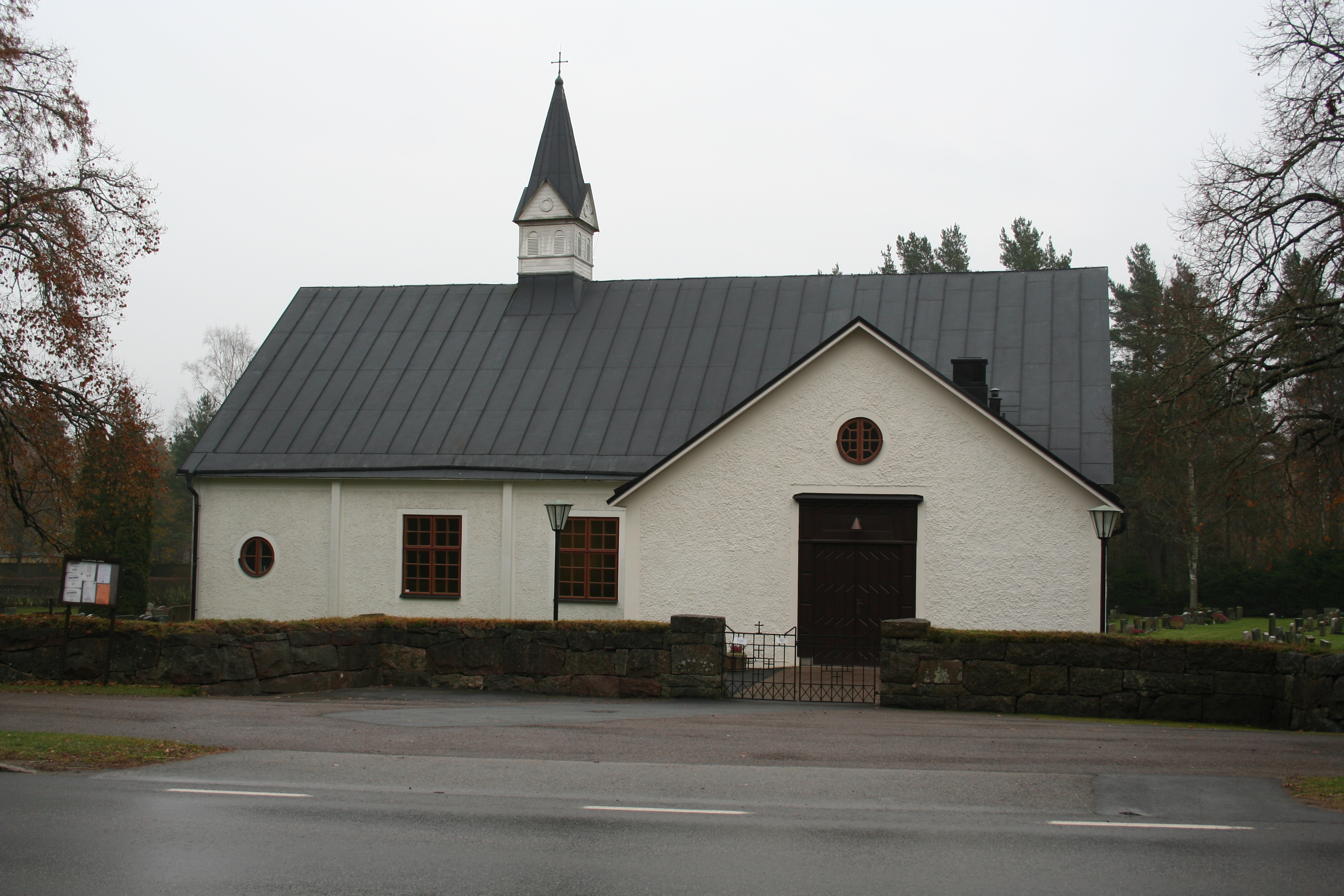
Mullhyttan Church (2007)

Mullhyttan is a locality situated in Lekeberg Municipality, Örebro County, Sweden with 503 inhabitants in 2010.
