= Latorpsbruk =

- Location within Örebro Location within Sweden
- Coordinates: 59°17′N 14°59′E
- Country: Sweden
- Province: Närke
- County: Örebro County
- Municipality: Örebro Municipality

Area
  - Total: 0.85 km^{2} (0.33 sq mi)

Population (31 December 2010)
  - Total: 597
  - Density: 704/km^{2} (1,820/sq mi)
- Time zone: UTC+1 (CET)
  - Summer (DST): UTC+2 (CEST)

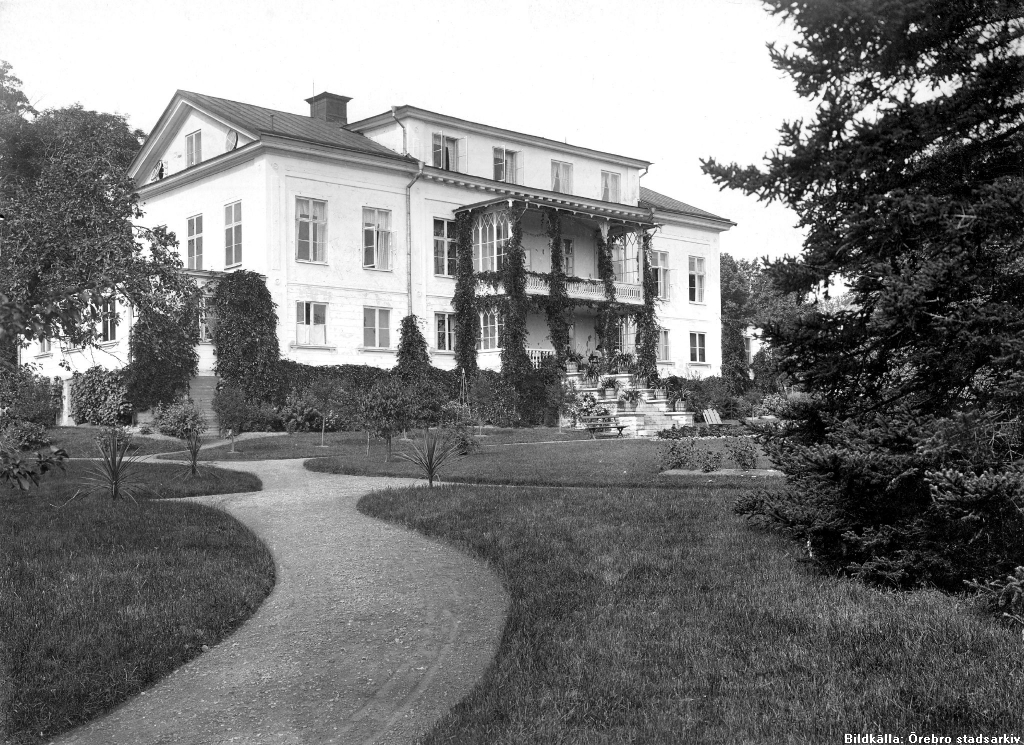

Latorpsbruk is a locality situated in Örebro Municipality, Örebro County, Sweden with 597 inhabitants in 2010.
