= Askersby =

- Location within Örebro Location within Sweden
- Coordinates: 59°09′N 15°28′E
- Country: Sweden
- Province: Närke
- County: Örebro County
- Municipality: Örebro Municipality

Area
  - Total: 0.53 km^{2} (0.20 sq mi)

Population (31 December 2010)
  - Total: 243
  - Density: 459/km^{2} (1,190/sq mi)
- Time zone: UTC+1 (CET)
  - Summer (DST): UTC+2 (CEST)

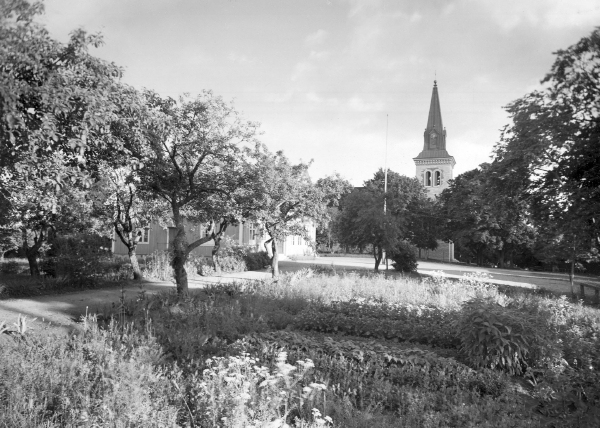
Asker church (outside Örebro), Sweden

Askersby is a locality situated in Örebro Municipality, Örebro County, Sweden with 243 inhabitants in 2010.
