= Marieberg, Örebro =

Marieberg
- Location within Örebro Location within Sweden
- Coordinates: 59°13′32″N 15°09′33″E
- Country: Sweden
- Province: Närke
- County: Örebro County
- Municipality: Örebro Municipality

Area
  - Total: 2.03 km^{2} (0.78 sq mi)

Population (2005-12-31)
  - Total: 1,181
  - Density: 581/km^{2} (1,500/sq mi)
- Time zone: UTC+1 (CET)
  - Summer (DST): UTC+2 (CEST)

Marieberg is a village situated in Örebro Municipality, Örebro County, Sweden with 1,181 inhabitants in 2005.
