= Hällabrottet =

- Location within Örebro Location within Sweden
- Coordinates: 59°07′N 15°12′E
- Country: Sweden
- Province: Närke
- County: Örebro County
- Municipality: Kumla Municipality

Area
  - Total: 2.92 km^{2} (1.13 sq mi)

Population (31 December 2010)
  - Total: 1,789
  - Density: 613/km^{2} (1,590/sq mi)
- Time zone: UTC+1 (CET)
  - Summer (DST): UTC+2 (CEST)

Hällabrottet is a locality situated in Kumla Municipality, Örebro County, Sweden with 1,789 inhabitants in 2010.

== Riksdag elections ==
Year	%	Votes	V	S	MP	C	L	KD	M	SD	NyD	Left	Right
1973	88.1	941	6.5	49.6		24.4	8.2	4.3	7.0			56.1	39.6
1976	90.4	1,093	4.8	47.0		25.5	11.2	3.9	7.3			51.8	44.0
1979	91.1	1,235	4.5	49.1		19.0	10.0	3.2	13.6			53.6	42.6
1982	94.4	1,211	4.8	51.9	1.1	15.3	7.0	4.3	15.6			56.6	37.9
1985	93.5	1,277	4.5	50.5	1.9	14.4	14.3		13.8			55.1	42.5
1988	87.1	1,214	6.1	49.2	4.0	10.6	12.6	6.8	10.5			59.3	33.8
1991	89.3	1,304	6.0	40.9	1.5	8.1	9.6	9.7	15.4		8.0	46.9	42.9
1994	88.8	1,334	8.4	50.4	3.6	6.0	7.9	6.6	14.9		1.6	62.4	35.4
1998	82.6	1,217	12.0	44.9	3.0	4.4	6.4	11.8	15.4			59.8	38.0
2002	85.1	1,275	7.3	48.0	3.7	5.7	11.0	10.7	9.9	2.5		59.0	37.3
2006	87.1	1,303	4.1	47.4	2.7	6.9	6.5	8.3	18.1	4.3		54.2	39.8
2010	87.7	1,360	3.6	40.2	4.7	5.0	6.9	6.5	24.3	7.9		48.5	42.6
2014	89.8	1,402	4.0	36.6	4.9	4.8	4.9	5.4	18.8	18.5		45.4	33.9
2018	89.2	1,363	5.5	31.8	2.0	6.7	5.5	7.6	18.0	22.5		45.9	53.5
