= Närke Runic Inscription 29 =

Viking Age runestone

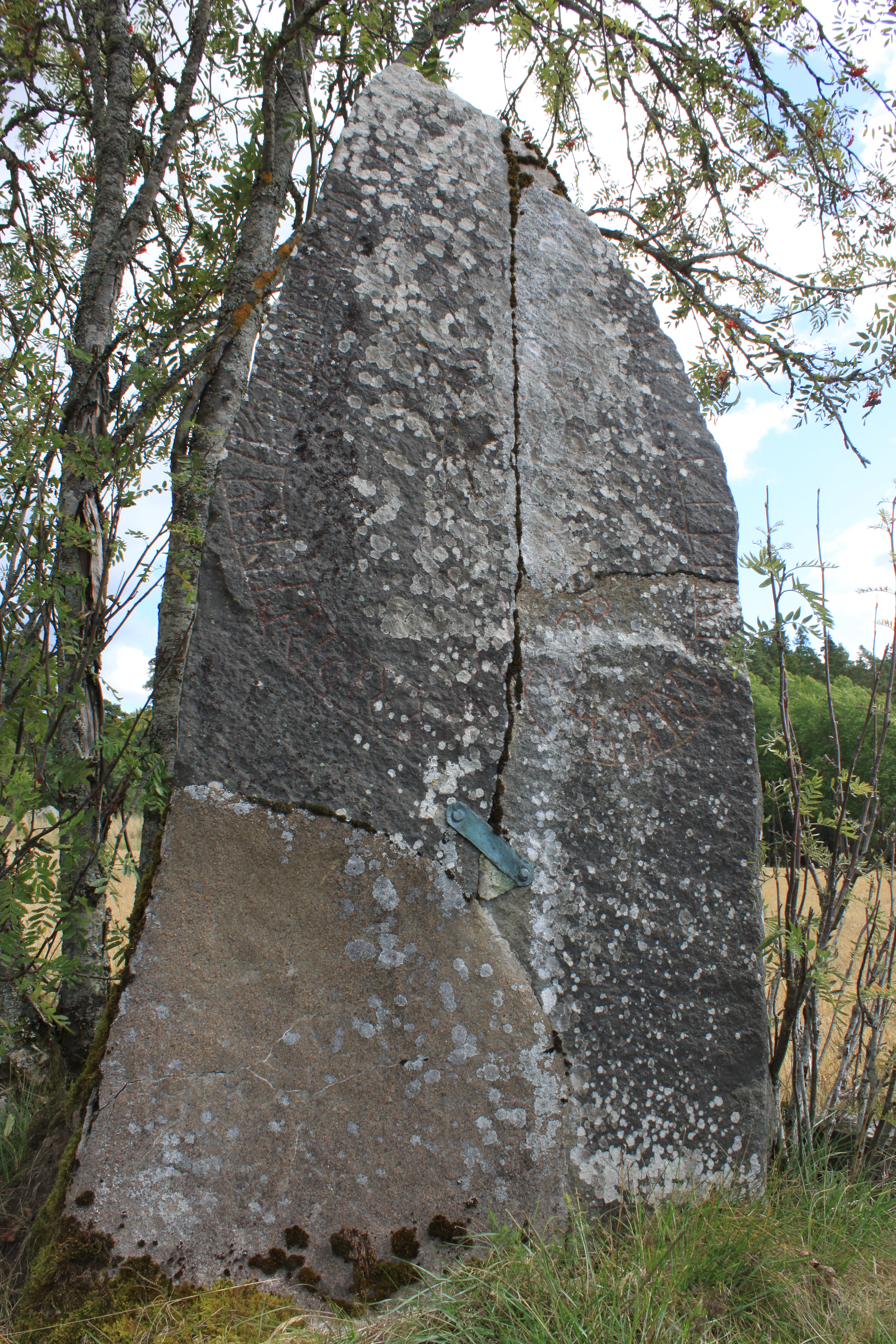
Nä 29

The Närke Runic Inscription 29 is a Viking Age runestone engraved in Old Norse with the Younger Futhark runic alphabet. It is dark grey granite and it is located in Apelboda, Glanshammars parish, in Örebro Municipality. The style is Pr1. The stone is 2.15 m high and 0.95 m wide.

The stone is notable in the way it expresses the zeitgeist of the Viking Age with the alliterating expression: Hann vaʀ farinn fulldrængila. i.e. "He had travelled valiantly". The adverb drængila is derived from the noun drængʀ which means "as befits a man", and it is found in several other runestones, such as Sö 113, Sö 130, Sö 164 and Sö 179. This is the only source for the compound adverb fulldrængila outside of Iceland, where it is attested a few times in skaldic poetry, as in Strophe 15 of Austrfararvisur, from the beginning of the 11th c., and from Einarr Gilsson (14th c.). The adjective fulldrengiligr is known from Egil's Saga (ch. 8).

== Inscription ==
bofriþr : let resa eftir biurn : bruþur : si(n) : han uar farin fultrekila
Bofriðr/Botfriðr/Botfreðr {} let ræisa æftiʀ Biorn, {} broður {} sinn. {} Hann vaʀ farinn fulldrængila.
"Bófríðr/Bótfríðr/Bótfreðr had (the stone) raised in memory of Bjôrn, her/his brother. He had travelled valiantly."
