= Gropen =

- Location within Örebro Location within Sweden
- Coordinates: 59°9′N 14°50′E
- Country: Sweden
- Province: Närke
- County: Örebro County
- Municipality: Lekeberg Municipality

Area
  - Total: 1.15 km^{2} (0.44 sq mi)

Population (28 November 2024)
  - Total: 270
  - Density: 680/km^{2} (1,800/sq mi)
- Time zone: UTC+1 (CET)
  - Summer (DST): UTC+2 (CEST)

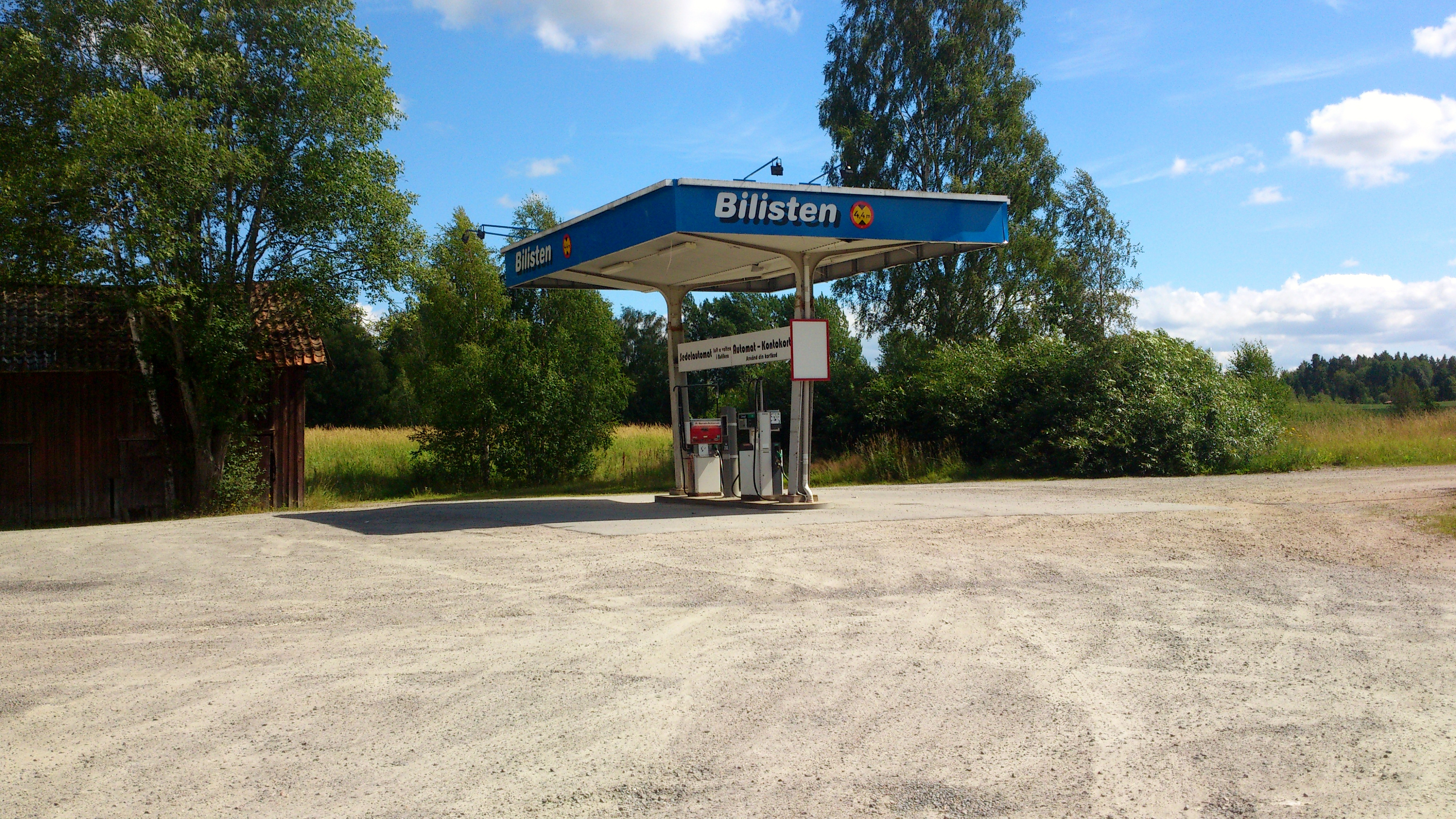
Bilisten station in Gropen, Lekeberg municipality

Gropen is a locality situated in Lekeberg Municipality in Örebro County, Sweden with 270 inhabitants in 2023.
