= Norra Bro =

- Location within Örebro Location within Sweden
- Coordinates: 59°13′N 15°15′E
- Country: Sweden
- Province: Närke
- County: Örebro County
- Municipality: Örebro Municipality

Area
  - Total: 0.73 km^{2} (0.28 sq mi)

Population (31 December 2010)
  - Total: 687
  - Density: 938/km^{2} (2,430/sq mi)
- Time zone: UTC+1 (CET)
  - Summer (DST): UTC+2 (CEST)

Norra Bro is a locality situated in Örebro Municipality, Örebro County, Sweden with 687 inhabitants in 2010.
