= Axbergs IF =

Swedish football club

- Full name: Axbergs Idrottsförening
- Founded: 26 March 1932
- Ground: Dyltavallen; Ölmbrotorp; Sweden
- Chairman: Roy Tärnler
- Head coach: Johan Norlén
- League: Division 5 Örebro Norra
Home colours	Away colours

Axbergs IF is a Swedish football club located in Ölmbrotorp.

== Background ==
Axbergs IF plays in Division 5 Örebro Norra which is the seventh tier of Swedish football. They play their home matches at the Dyltavallen in Ölmbrotorp.

The club is affiliated to Örebro Läns Fotbollförbund. The club withdrew from the league in the 2011 season although they did compete in the 2011 Svenska Cupen but lost 0–8 away to IFK Mariestad in the preliminary round.

== Season to season ==
Season	Level	Division	Section	Position	Movements
2006*	Tier 9	Division 7	Örebro Norra	4th	
2007	Tier 9	Division 7	Örebro Norra	2nd	Promoted
2008	Tier 8	Division 6	Örebro Norra	6th	
2009	Tier 8	Division 6	Örebro Norra	2nd	Promoted
2010	Tier 7	Division 5	Örebro Norra	4th	
2011	Tier 7	Division 5	Örebro Norra		Withdrew
2012**	Tier 9	Division 7	Örebro Norra	7th	
2013	Tier 9	Division 7	Örebro Norra	3rd	
2014	Tier 9	Division 7	Örebro Norra	1st	Promoted
2015	Tier 8	Division 6	Örebro***	7th	
2016	Tier 8	Division 6	Örebro	5th	
2017	Tier 8	Division 6	Örebro	8th	
2018	Tier 8	Division 6	Örebro	2nd	Promoted
2019	Tier 7	Division 5	Örebro	Ongoing	

* League restructuring in 2006 resulted in a new division being created at Tier 3 and subsequent divisions dropping a level.

** The club immediately reconstructed the team after the withdrawal, which automatically placed them in the lowest tier in the league system.

*** Because of a lack of representational teams establishing in the lower league system, in parallel with clubs dropping out, it eventually led to a fusion were former local subdivisions became a single division.
