= Hovsta =

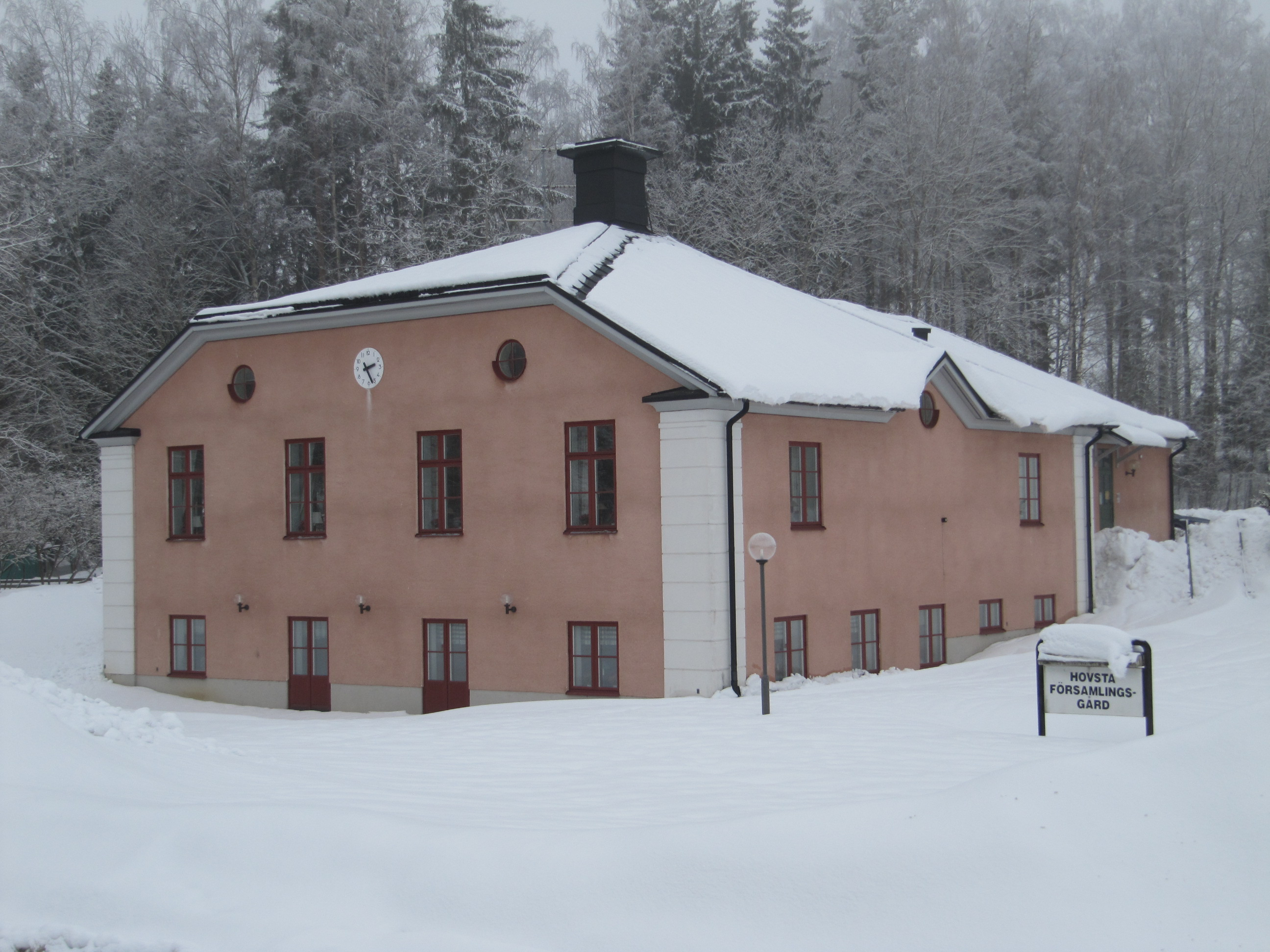
- Hovsta församlingsgård

- Location within Örebro Location within Sweden
- Coordinates: 59°21′N 15°13′E
- Country: Sweden
- Province: Närke
- County: Örebro County
- Municipality: Örebro Municipality

Area
  - Total: 1.66 km^{2} (0.64 sq mi)

Population (31 December 2010)
  - Total: 2,785
  - Density: 1,673/km^{2} (4,330/sq mi)
- Time zone: UTC+1 (CET)
  - Summer (DST): UTC+2 (CEST)

Hovsta (Swedish pronunciation: [ˈhûːvsta]) is a locality and a parish situated in Örebro Municipality, Örebro County, Sweden with 2,785 inhabitants in 2010.

== Notable people ==
- Sofia Helin (born 25 April 1972), a Swedish actress best known for her role as Saga Norén in The Bridge, was born in Hovsta.
