= Fjugesta =

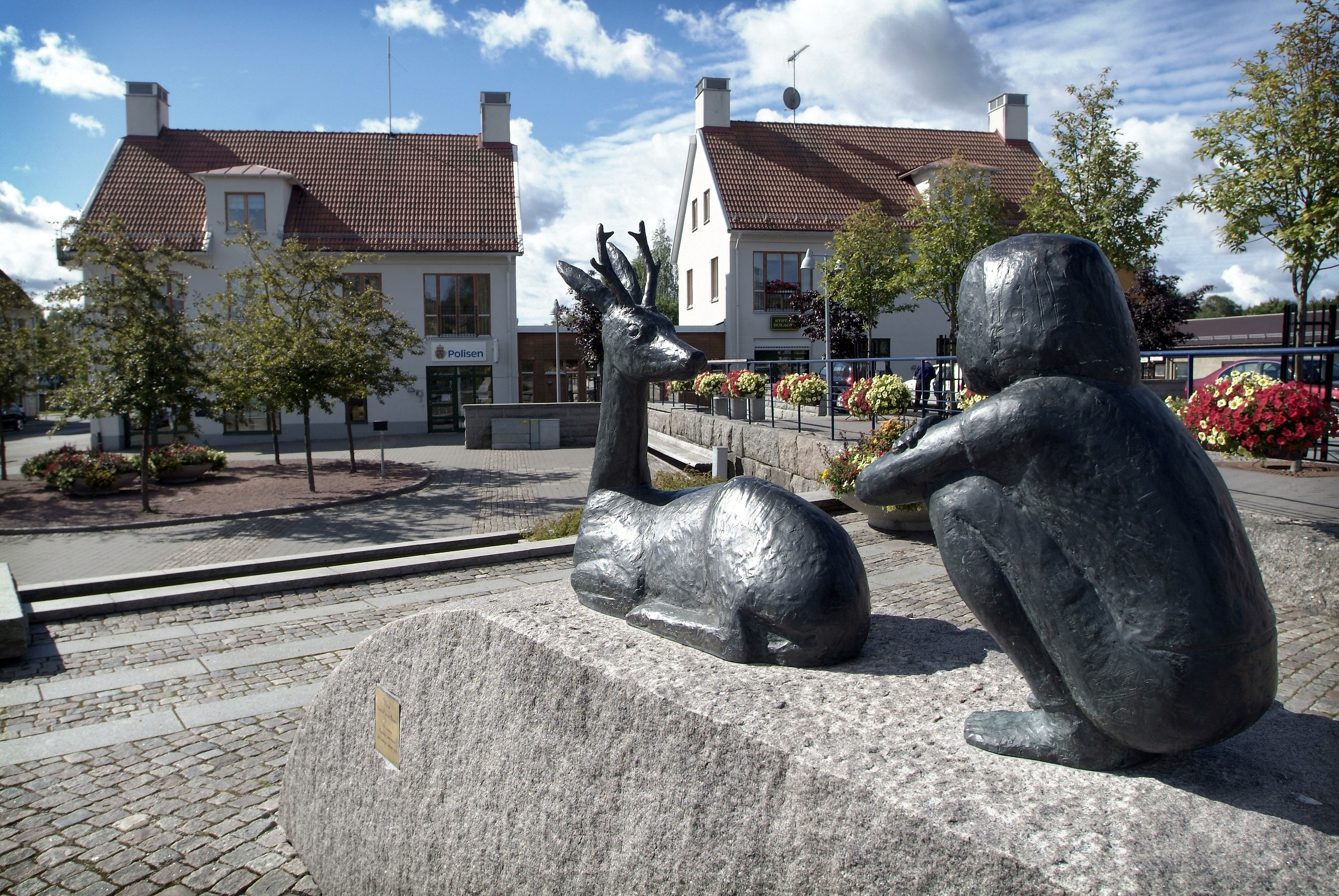
- Fjugesta Square

- Location within Örebro Location within Sweden
- Coordinates: 59°10′N 14°52′E
- Country: Sweden
- Province: Närke
- County: Örebro County
- Municipality: Lekeberg Municipality

Area
  - Total: 2.09 km^{2} (0.81 sq mi)

Population (31 December 2010)
  - Total: 2,033
  - Density: 974/km^{2} (2,520/sq mi)
- Time zone: UTC+1 (CET)
  - Summer (DST): UTC+2 (CEST)

Fjugesta is a locality and the seat of Lekeberg Municipality, Örebro County, Sweden, with 2,033 inhabitants in 2010.

Fjugesta is the hometown of Southeastern Louisiana University international English writing teacher Birgitta Ramsey.

In Sweden, Fjugesta is widely identified with "Fjugesta-mordet" (the Fjugesta murder), for which Swedish Olympic athlete Olle Möller was convicted.

Fjugesta has diverse local business and industry. Currently it has multiple repair shops for automotive vehicles and tune-up stores, but also multiple independent carpeting businesses.
