= Glanshammar =

- Location within Örebro Location within Sweden
- Coordinates: 59°19′N 15°24′E
- Country: Sweden
- Province: Närke
- County: Örebro County
- Municipality: Örebro Municipality

Area
  - Total: 0.93 km^{2} (0.36 sq mi)

Population (31 December 2010)
  - Total: 727
  - Density: 782/km^{2} (2,030/sq mi)
- Time zone: UTC+1 (CET)
  - Summer (DST): UTC+2 (CEST)

Glanshammar is a locality situated in Örebro Municipality, Örebro County, Sweden with 727 inhabitants in 2010.

== Riksdag elections ==
Year	%	Votes	V	S	MP	C	L	KD	M	SD	NyD	Left	Right
1973	88.7	918	1.9	29.2		45.9	9.2	0.7	12.5			31.0	67.5
1976	91.7	1,108	2.3	31.1		41.8	10.3	0.6	13.7			33.5	65.8
1979	90.4	1,128	2.8	30.8		34.4	11.7	1.3	18.1			33.6	64.2
1982	90.2	1,154	2.9	33.5	2.3	29.7	6.0	1.4	24.3			36.4	60.0
1985	88.4	1,106	2.4	31.5	2.7	22.7	20.3		20.3			33.8	63.3
1988	85.9	1,100	2.9	33.4	5.5	21.8	17.6	3.3	15.3			41.8	54.7
1991	86.5	1,172	2.3	28.5	3.8	15.4	13.8	8.4	17.6		9.8	30.8	55.2
1994	87.5	1,211	5.0	35.7	7.9	13.9	10.7	5.5	18.9		2.1	48.6	49.0
1998	82.9	1,221	11.0	30.4	5.2	10.0	6.4	13.6	20.2			46.5	50.2
2002	80.2	1,151	6.4	34.9	4.3	14.6	12.3	10.8	14.9	0.9		45.6	52.6
2006	83.9	1,200	4.1	30.6	6.4	14.9	7.4	8.2	23.3	3.3		41.1	53.8
2010	88.2	1,315	4.7	26.2	7.8	10.0	7.5	6.7	29.7	6.5		38.7	53.9
2014	88.7	1,346	4.2	26.1	6.5	10.4	5.4	4.7	23.8	14.6		36.7	44.3
2018	87.4	1,360	6.4	23.9	4.6	12.4	4.9	6.3	20.7	19.1		47.3	51.0
