= Ekeby-Almby =

- Location in Örebro Municipality in Örebro County Ekeby-Almby (Örebro)
- Coordinates: 59°15′30″N 15°20′00″E
- Country: Sweden
- Province: Närke
- County: Örebro County
- Municipality: Örebro Municipality

Area
  - Total: 1.45 km^{2} (0.56 sq mi)

Population (31 December 2010)
  - Total: 1,271
  - Density: 877/km^{2} (2,270/sq mi)
- Time zone: UTC+1 (CET)
  - Summer (DST): UTC+2 (CEST)

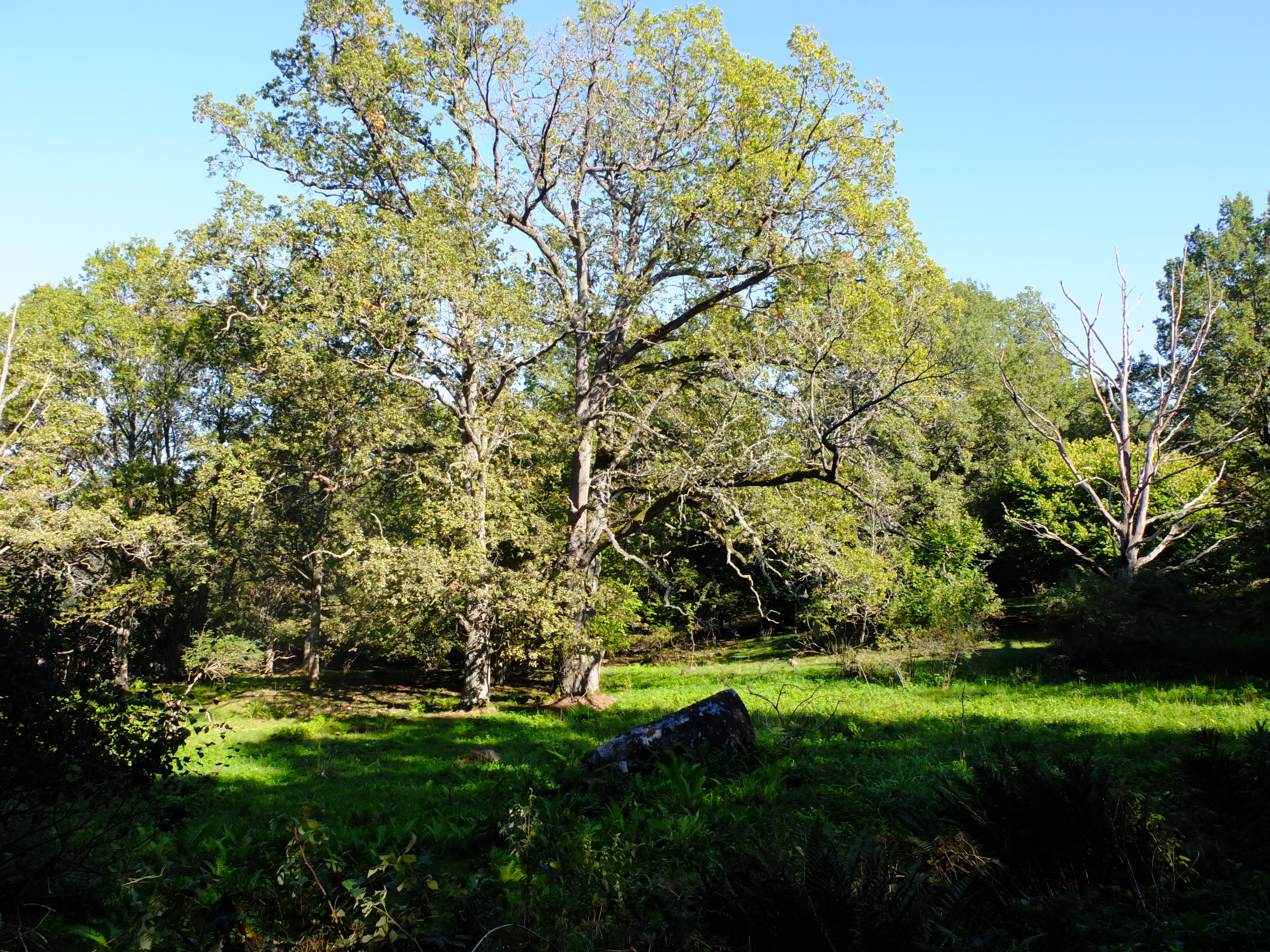
The Ekeby ekhage nature reserve near Ekeby-Almby in Örebro, Sweden

Ekeby-Almby is a locality situated in Örebro Municipality, Örebro County, Sweden with 1,271 inhabitants in 2010.
