= Stina Segerström =

Swedish footballer (born 1982)

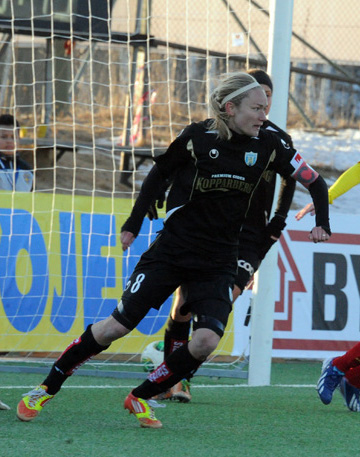
- Segerström during the 2013 Svenska Supercupen on 1 April 2013.

Personal information
- Full name: Stina Segerström
- Date of birth: 17 June 1982 (age 44)
- Place of birth: Vintrosa, Sweden
- Height: 1.77 m (5 ft 10 in)
- Position: Defender

Youth career
- 1999: Örebro SK

Senior career*
Years	Team	Apps	(Gls)
2000–2008	KIF Örebro DFF		
2009–2015	Kopparbergs/Göteborg FC	84	(0)

International career^{‡}
2006–	Sweden	57	(3)
- * Club domestic league appearances and goals as of 21:58, 20 July 2015 (UTC) ‡ National team caps and goals as of 7 June 2013

Stina Segerström (born 17 June 1982) is a Swedish football defender who last played for Kopparbergs/Göteborg FC and the Swedish national team. She was voted rookie of the year (Sweden) in 2006. She has captained KIF Örebro DFF and Kopparbergs/Göteborg FC.

== Early life ==
Segerström spent her early years being raised in Vintrosa. As a youth, she spent two years in Pakistan when her family moved there as aid workers for Save the Children. Upon her family's return to Sweden, they moved to Örebro and Segerström began playing football with Örebro SK at age 11.

== Playing career ==
=== Club ===
==== Kopparbergs/Göteborg FC ====
Since 2009, Segerström has played for Kopparbergs/Göteborg FC in the Damallsvenskan, the highest division of football in Sweden. During her first season with the team, she started in all 20 matches in which she appeared. Göteborg finished fourth during regular season play with a 14–3–5 record.

Segerström returned for the 2010 season and helped Göteborg finish second during regular season play with a 14–6–2 record as a starting defender for the squad. She played every minute of the season.

Segerström made only three appearances for Göteborg during the 2011 season due to a torn Achilles tendon that she suffered during a match against Umeå IK. Göteborg finished second during regular season play with a 15–3–4 record.

In 2012, Segerström started in all 19 of her appearances for the club She helped the team clinch the 2012 Svenska Cupen playing every minute of the tournament. Göteborg defeated Tyresö FF 2–1 in overtime during the final. She returned in April 2013 and helped Göteborg defeat 2012 Damallsvenskan champions Tyresö to clinch the Svenska Supercupen playing defense every minute of the match.

Segerström sat out the 2014 season due to the birth of her son Charlie. In November 2014 she was appointed assistant coach of Elitettan minnows Kungsbacka DFF, with Johanna Almgren as her boss.

=== International ===
Segerström made her debut for the Sweden women's national football team on 2 March 2006 during a friendly match against England.

Segerström was named as an alternate for the Sweden squad at the 2012 London Olympics. She had missed the 2011 FIFA Women's World Cup with a torn achilles tendon.

== International goals ==
List of international goals scored by Stina Segerström
No.	Date	Venue	Opponent	Score	Result	Competition
1.	20 June 2007	Unknown	Hungary	4–0	7-0	2007 FIFA Women's World Cup
2.	20 June 2007	Unknown	Hungary	6-0	7-0	2007 FIFA Women's World Cup
3.	21 January 2011	Yongchuan Sports Center, China	United States	1-1	2-1	Friendly

== Honors and awards ==
=== Individual ===
- Fair Play Prize, 2006

=== Team ===
- Winner, Svenska Cupen Women, 2011–12
- Winner, Super Cup Women, 2013
