= Odensbacken =

- Location within Örebro Location within Sweden
- Coordinates: 59°10′N 15°31′E
- Country: Sweden
- Province: Närke
- County: Örebro County
- Municipality: Örebro Municipality

Area
  - Total: 1.47 km^{2} (0.57 sq mi)

Population (31 December 2010)
  - Total: 1,374
  - Density: 936/km^{2} (2,420/sq mi)
- Time zone: UTC+1 (CET)
  - Summer (DST): UTC+2 (CEST)

Odensbacken is a locality situated in Örebro Municipality, Örebro County, Sweden with 1,374 inhabitants in 2010.
