= Garphyttan National Park =

National park in Sweden

- Garphyttans nationalpark
- IUCN category II (national park)
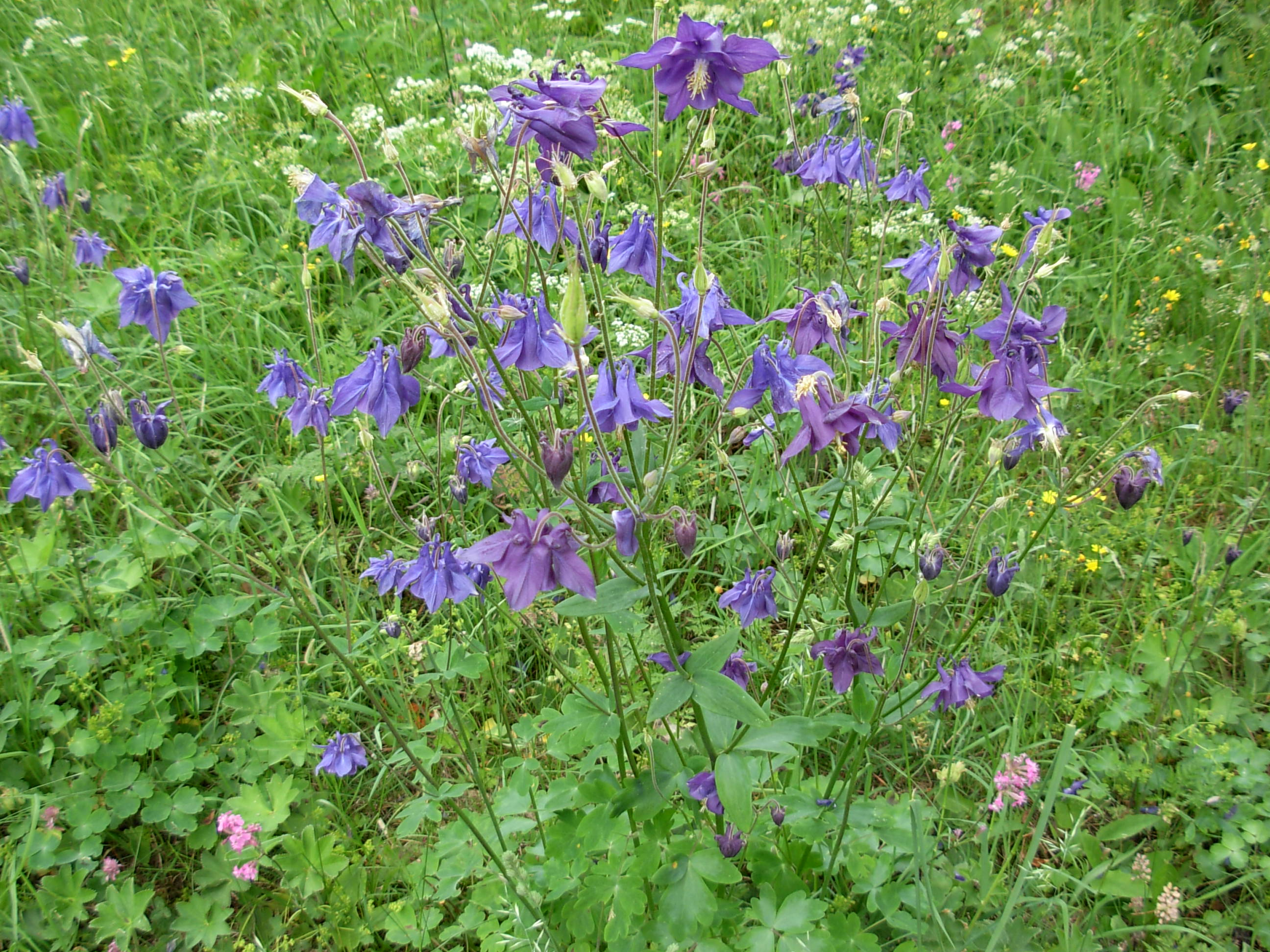
- Flowers in Garphyttan National Park
- Interactive map of Garphyttan National Park
- Location: Örebro County, Sweden
- Nearest city: Örebro, Örebro Municipality
- Coordinates: 59°16.7′N 14°53′E
- Area: 1.11 km^{2} (0.43 sq mi)
- Established: 1909
- Governing body: Naturvårdsverket

Garphyttan National Park (Swedish: Garphyttans nationalpark) is a Swedish national park in Kilsbergen west of Örebro in Lekeberg Municipality. The national park has an area of 1.11 km^{2} (0.43 mi^{2}) and was established in 1909 as the first of its kind in Sweden, but was in existence as early as 1857.

National parks of Sweden (clickable map)
