= Marieberg =

Marieberg may refer to:

- Marieberg, Stockholm
- Marieberg, Örebro
