= Garphyttan =

- Location within Örebro Location within Sweden
- Coordinates: 59°18′07″N 14°56′58″E
- Country: Sweden
- Province: Närke
- County: Örebro County
- Municipality: Örebro Municipality

Area
  - Total: 1.72 km^{2} (0.66 sq mi)

Population (31 December 2010)
  - Total: 1,619
  - Density: 941/km^{2} (2,440/sq mi)
- Time zone: UTC+1 (CET)
  - Summer (DST): UTC+2 (CEST)

Garphyttan is a locality situated in Örebro Municipality, Örebro County, Sweden with 1,619 inhabitants in 2010. It lies 16 km northwest of Örebro, near Garphyttan National Park.

== Riksdag elections ==
| Year | % | Votes | V | S | MP | C | L | KD | M | SD | NyD | Left | Right |
|---|---|---|---|---|---|---|---|---|---|---|---|---|---|
| 1973 | 93.1 | 815 | 2.8 | 74.0 | | 11.5 | 5.9 | 1.6 | 4.0 | | | 76.8 | 21.5 |
| 1976 | 94.3 | 948 | 3.8 | 71.5 | | 13.6 | 6.3 | 0.8 | 3.7 | | | 75.3 | 23.6 |
| 1979 | 92.5 | 951 | 3.3 | 71.7 | | 7.8 | 7.4 | 1.1 | 8.3 | | | 75.0 | 23.4 |
| 1982 | 94.8 | 1,036 | 2.6 | 70.3 | 2.6 | 8.1 | 3.6 | 1.7 | 11.1 | | | 72.9 | 22.8 |
| 1985 | 92.2 | 1,049 | 4.8 | 64.4 | 2.3 | 5.7 | 11.7 | | 9.4 | | | 69.2 | 26.9 |
| 1988 | 91.3 | 1,067 | 6.1 | 63.5 | 5.0 | 4.7 | 10.4 | 1.5 | 7.8 | | | 74.6 | 22.9 |
| 1991 | 89.7 | 1,114 | 4.0 | 55.8 | 4.2 | 3.7 | 10.3 | 5.7 | 10.3 | | 5.4 | 59.9 | 30.1 |
| 1994 | 90.3 | 1,120 | 7.9 | 61.4 | 5.1 | 3.6 | 6.8 | 3.2 | 10.5 | | 0.7 | 74.4 | 24.1 |
| 1998 | 85.6 | 1,050 | 13.2 | 53.6 | 7.0 | 1.9 | 6.3 | 6.2 | 9.8 | | | 73.8 | 24.2 |
| 2002 | 84.8 | 1,059 | 7.2 | 59.3 | 5.8 | 3.2 | 9.9 | 5.3 | 6.2 | 2.2 | | 72.2 | 24.6 |
| 2006 | 85.8 | 1,068 | 4.4 | 51.8 | 6.9 | 6.1 | 4.9 | 5.7 | 13.6 | 5.1 | | 63.1 | 30.2 |
| 2010 | 88.9 | 1,168 | 3.7 | 46.8 | 8.6 | 3.9 | 4.8 | 5.0 | 20.3 | 6.4 | | 59.1 | 34.0 |
| 2014 | 89.3 | 1,183 | 4.7 | 43.1 | 9.0 | 4.4 | 2.8 | 3.2 | 14.8 | 15.6 | | 56.8 | 25.2 |
| 2018 | 88.0 | 1,181 | 6.6 | 38.0 | 4.7 | 6.7 | 4.7 | 4.2 | 13.9 | 20.3 | | 56.0 | 43.1 |
