= Vintrosa =

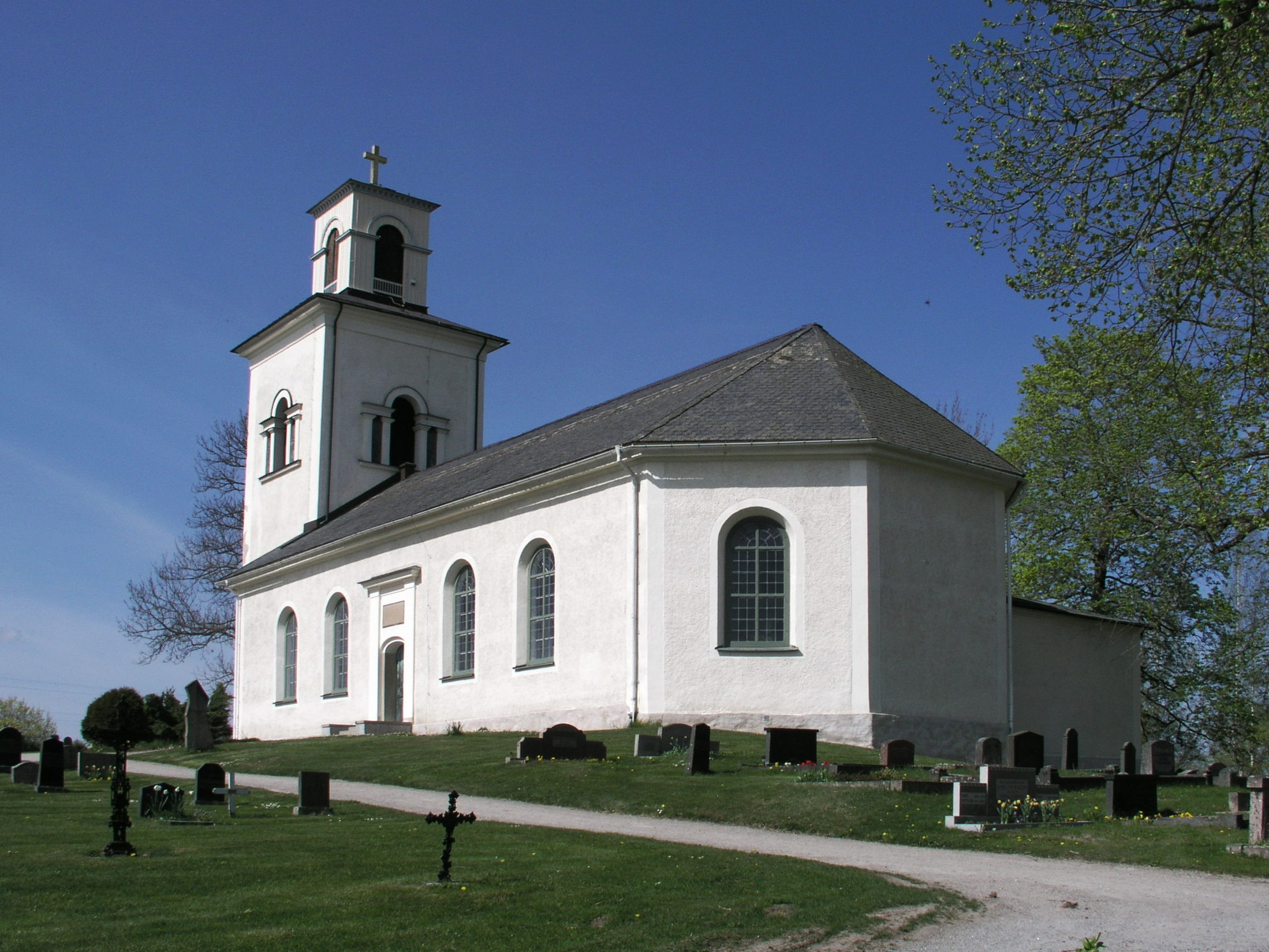

- Location within Örebro Location within Sweden
- Coordinates: 59°15′N 14°57′E
- Country: Sweden
- Province: Närke
- County: Örebro County
- Municipality: Örebro Municipality

Area
  - Total: 1.63 km^{2} (0.63 sq mi)

Population (31 December 2010)
  - Total: 1,343
  - Density: 825/km^{2} (2,140/sq mi)
- Time zone: UTC+1 (CET)
  - Summer (DST): UTC+2 (CEST)

Vintrosa (Swedish pronunciation: [ˈvɪ̂nːˌtruːsa]) is a locality situated in Örebro Municipality, Örebro County, Sweden with 1,343 inhabitants in 2010.
