= Stora Mellösa =

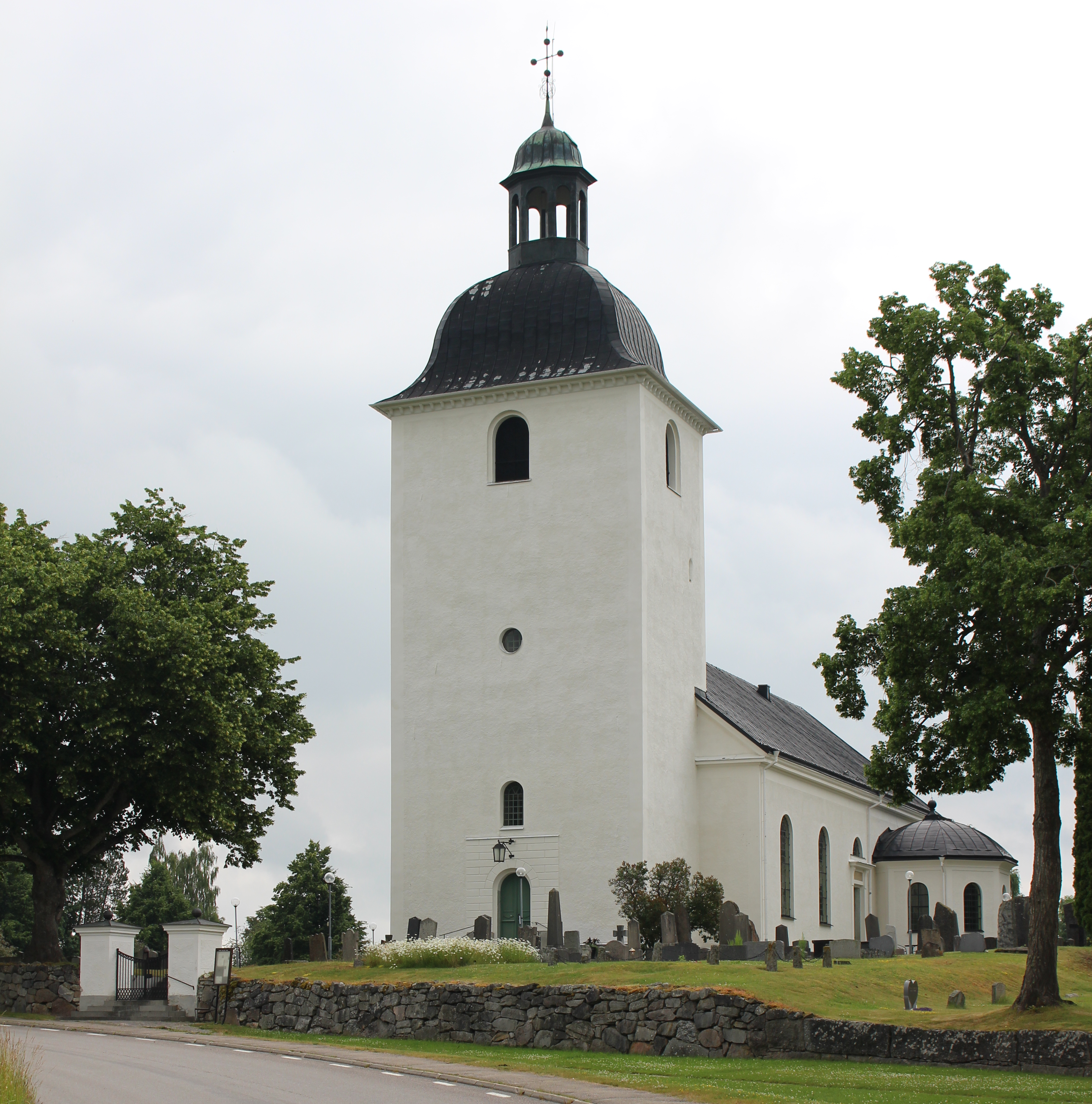
- The church of Stora Mellösa

- Location within Örebro Location within Sweden
- Coordinates: 59°13′N 15°30′E
- Country: Sweden
- Province: Närke
- County: Örebro County
- Municipality: Örebro Municipality

Area
  - Total: 0.72 km^{2} (0.28 sq mi)

Population (31 December 2010)
  - Total: 776
  - Density: 1,073/km^{2} (2,780/sq mi)
- Time zone: UTC+1 (CET)
  - Summer (DST): UTC+2 (CEST)

Stora Mellösa is a locality in Örebro Municipality, Örebro County, Sweden with 776 inhabitants in 2010.
