= Lekeberg Municipality =

Lekeberg Municipality Lekebergs kommun
- Municipality
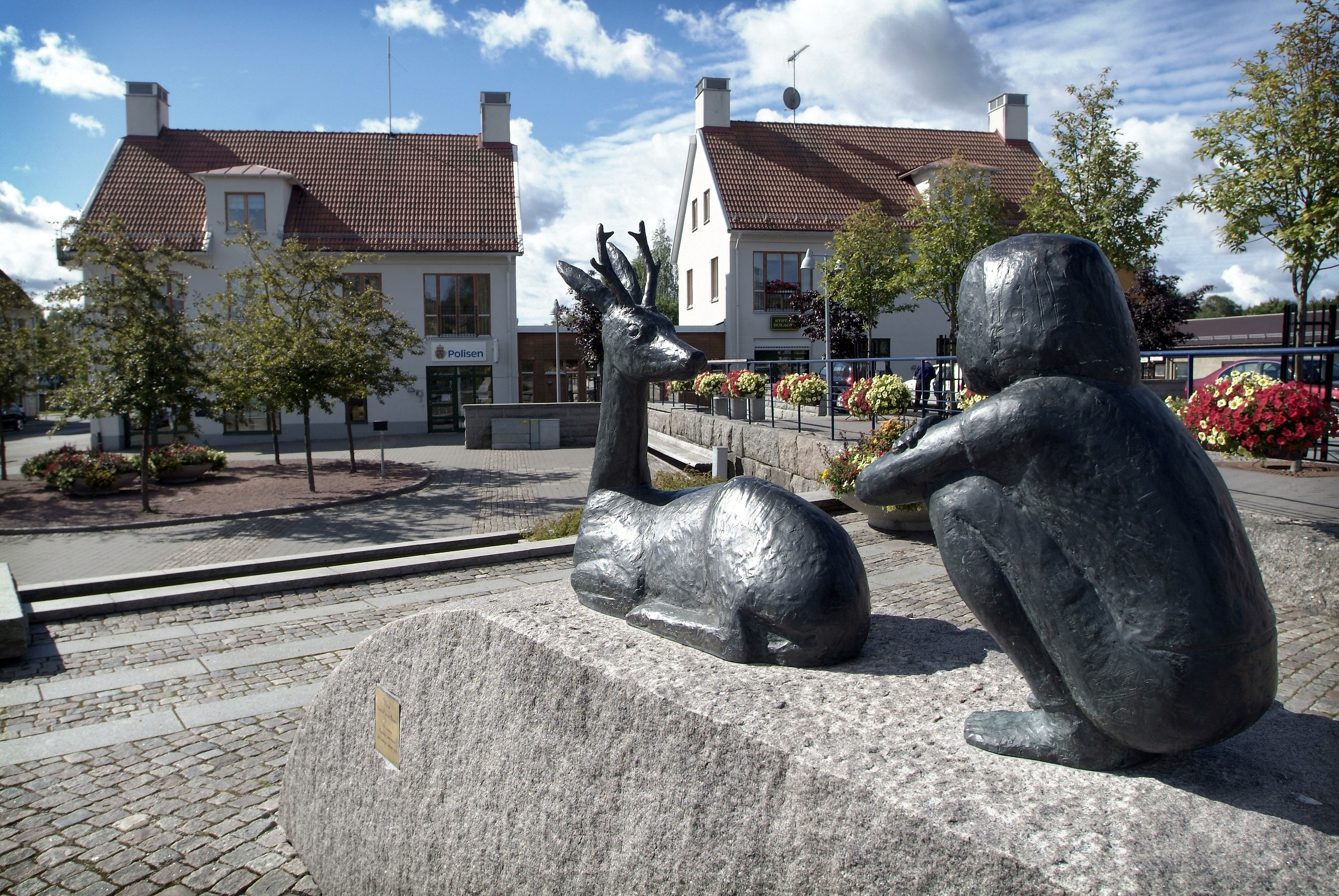

- Coat of arms

- Coordinates: 59°10′N 14°52′E
- Country: Sweden
- County: Örebro County
- Seat: Fjugesta

Area
  - Total: 481.63 km^{2} (185.96 sq mi)
  - Land: 463.16 km^{2} (178.83 sq mi)
  - Water: 18.47 km^{2} (7.13 sq mi)
- Area as of 1 January 2014.

Population (30 June 2025)
  - Total: 8,589
  - Density: 18.54/km^{2} (48.03/sq mi)
- Time zone: UTC+1 (CET)
  - Summer (DST): UTC+2 (CEST)
- ISO 3166 code: SE
- Province: Närke
- Municipal code: 1814
- Website: www.lekeberg.se

Lekeberg Municipality (Swedish: Lekebergs kommun) is a municipality in Örebro County in central Sweden. Its seat is located in the town of Fjugesta, with around 2,000 inhabitants.

Lekeberg was first formed as a municipality in connection with the local government reform of 1952 by the amalgamation of five smaller units. In 1967 two more parishes were added. The next reform of 1971 placed the area within Örebro Municipality. It was re-established in 1995 within its 1967 borders.

== Geography ==
Mostly woods and farm lands, with Garphyttan National Park, established in 1909, located within the municipality.

The largest industry sector is farming. Many farmers have further specialized on hog and chicken farming.

Other industries are small companies within wood and carpentry industries, as well as craftswork and other small enterprises.

=== Localities ===
Over 200 inhabitants:

- Fjugesta (seat)
- Gropen
- Hidinge
- Lanna
- Mullhyttan

== Demographics ==
This is a demographic table based on Lekeberg Municipality's electoral districts in the 2022 Swedish general election sourced from SVT's election platform, in turn taken from SCB official statistics.

In total there were 8,596 residents, including 6,359 Swedish citizens of voting age resident in the municipality. 41.8% voted for the left coalition and 56.6% for the right coalition. Indicators are in percentage points except population totals and income.

Location	Residents	Citizen adults	Left vote	Right vote	Employed	Swedish parents	Foreign heritage	Income SEK	Degree
Location			%	%					
Hidinge	2,209	1,532	42.1	57.2	91	92	8	31,819	53
Knista N & Ö	1,636	1,217	46.2	52.2	78	85	15	21,690	28
Knista V	1,394	1,047	44.6	54.2	80	89	11	24,515	26
Kräcklinge	1,530	1,167	36.7	61.2	87	95	5	26,944	31
Kvistbro V	1,032	817	39.6	58.0	84	92	8	24,082	31
Kvistbro Ö	795	579	40.8	56.1	89	94	6	26,674	30
Source: SVT

== Elections ==
=== Riksdag ===
From the 1994 election onwards the municipality was in existence due to the split with Örebro Municipality. The exact results of Sweden Democrats were not listed at a municipal level by SCB from 1994 to 1998 due to the party's small size at the time. "Turnout" denotes the percentage of eligible people casting any ballots, whereas "Votes" denotes the number of valid votes only.

Year	Turnout	Votes	V	S	MP	C	L	KD	M	SD	ND
1994	87.2	4,517	5.0	39.3	5.3	18.1	5.3	8.3	16.8	0.0	1.4
1998	80.3	4,264	10.7	32.7	4.4	14.0	3.7	15.9	16.7	0.0	0.0
2002	81.8	4,347	6.5	36.5	3.7	18.0	8.9	11.8	11.2	2.4	0.0
2006	83.6	4,519	4.1	34.8	3.6	17.2	4.9	10.0	18.9	4.7	0.0
2010	86.4	4,761	4.5	30.7	5.3	12.9	4.4	8.9	24.8	7.5	0.0
2014	88.4	4,939	4.3	30.0	4.3	13.4	3.1	6.8	16.9	18.2	0.0

Blocs

This lists the relative strength of the socialist and centre-right blocs since 1973, but parties not elected to the Riksdag are inserted as "other", including the Sweden Democrats results from 1994 to 2006. The sources are identical to the table above. The coalition or government mandate marked in bold formed the government after the election.

Year	Turnout	Votes	Left	Right	SD	Other	Elected
1994	87.2	4,517	**49.6**	48.5	0.0	1.9	98.1
1998	80.3	4,264	**47.8**	50.3	0.0	1.9	98.1
2002	81.8	4,347	**46.7**	49.9	0.0	3.5	96.5
2006	83.6	4,519	42.5	**51.0**	0.0	6.5	93.5
2010	86.4	4,761	40.5	**51.0**	7.5	1.0	99.0
2014	88.4	4,939	**38.6**	40.2	18.2	3.0	97.0

== Sights ==
The monastery ruin of Riseberga was the home of nuns of the Cistercian order in the medieval age. It burnt down in 1546, and remaining stones were used in the building of a local church some hundreds years later.

The amphitheatre of Riseberga is Sweden's largest of that kind, with 1,216 seats.

== Twin towns ==
Lekeberg's twin town with the year of its establishing:

1. (1996) Dundaga, Latvia
