= Kumla Municipality =

Kumla Municipality Kumla kommun
- Municipality
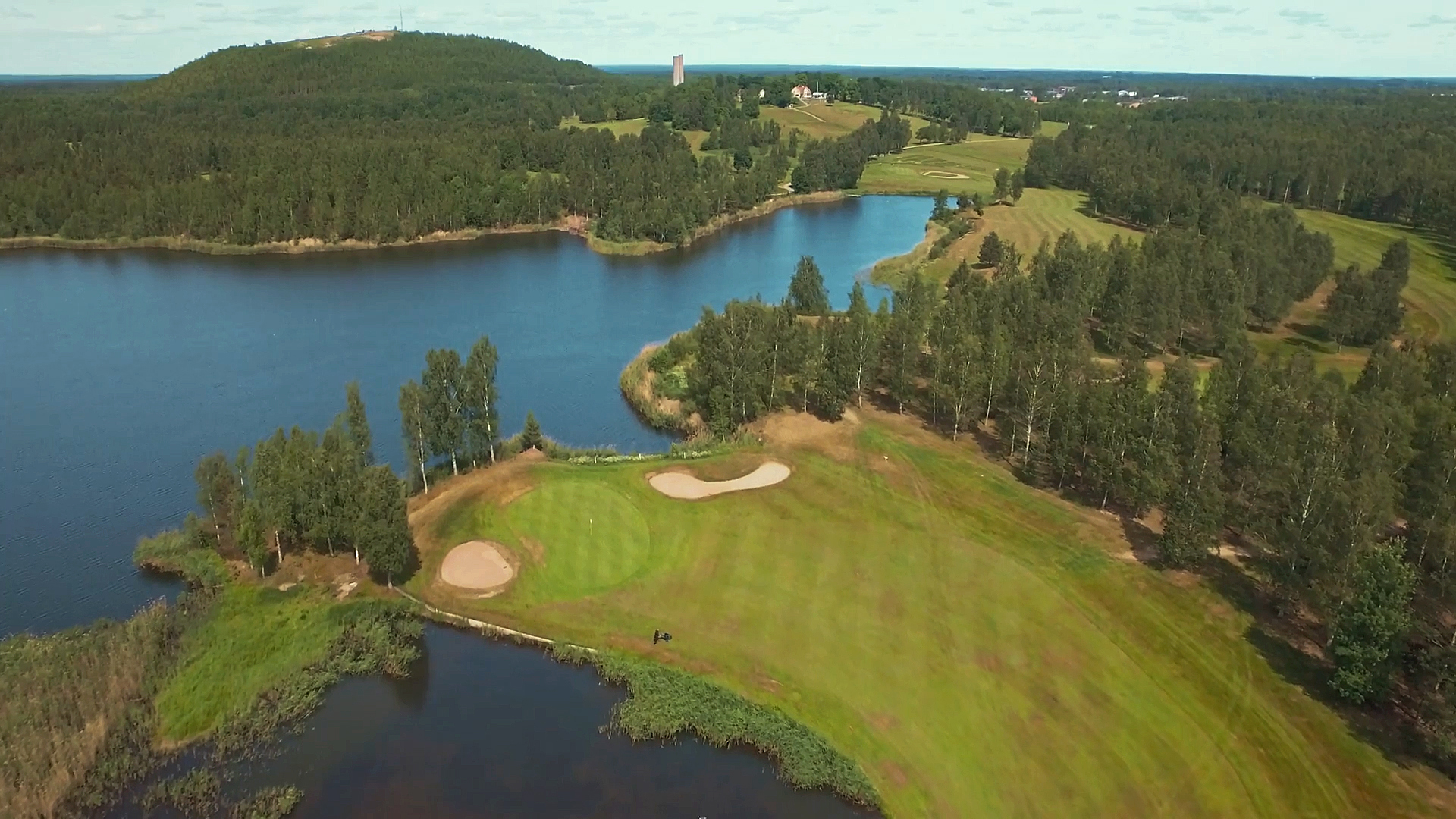

- Coat of arms

- Coordinates: 59°07′N 15°08′E
- Country: Sweden
- County: Örebro County
- Seat: Kumla

Area
  - Total: 205.8 km^{2} (79.5 sq mi)
  - Land: 204.18 km^{2} (78.83 sq mi)
  - Water: 1.62 km^{2} (0.63 sq mi)
- Area as of 1 January 2014.

Population (30 June 2025)
  - Total: 22,695
  - Density: 111.15/km^{2} (287.88/sq mi)
- Time zone: UTC+1 (CET)
  - Summer (DST): UTC+2 (CEST)
- ISO 3166 code: SE
- Province: Närke
- Municipal code: 1881
- Website: www.kumla.se

Kumla Municipality (Swedish: Kumla kommun) is a municipality in Örebro County in central Sweden. Its seat is located in the city of Kumla.

The present municipality was formed during the latest nationwide local government reform in Sweden, with the amalgamations taking place in 1966 and 1971.

With 207 km^{2} it is the smallest municipality in Örebro County.

== Localities ==
- Ekeby
- Hällabrottet
- Kumla (seat)
- Kvarntorp
- Sannahed
- Åbytorp

== Demographics ==
This is a demographic table based on Kumla Municipality's electoral districts in the 2022 Swedish general election sourced from SVT's election platform, in turn taken from SCB official statistics.

In total there were 22,123 residents, including 16,456 Swedish citizens of voting age resident in the municipality. 45.6% voted for the left coalition and 53.2% for the right coalition. Indicators are in percentage points except population totals and income.

Location	Residents	Citizen adults	Left vote	Right vote	Employed	Swedish parents	Foreign heritage	Income SEK	Degree
Location			%	%					
Ekeby-Kvarntorp	1,126	802	41.3	56.9	85	89	11	28,031	38
Fylsta	1,936	1,401	51.3	47.1	68	60	40	19,174	26
Haga	2,072	1,535	47.5	51.9	84	82	18	27,880	40
Hällabrottet	2,083	1,575	43.1	56.2	85	91	9	27,929	30
Kumlaby	2,157	1,536	44.6	54.4	77	79	21	24,391	26
Malmen	1,698	1,306	52.8	44.7	66	66	34	19,385	26
Skogstorp	1,992	1,415	42.4	56.5	90	90	10	29,960	45
Stadshuset	1,884	1,528	53.8	45.5	77	83	17	21,299	30
Sörby	1,843	1,178	39.6	59.6	92	88	12	33,158	46
Vialund	1,675	1,260	47.2	52.4	82	80	20	26,958	35
Åbytorp-Hardemo	1,763	1,347	39.4	58.3	85	93	7	27,125	31
Åsen	1,894	1,573	45.0	53.9	82	86	14	25,779	33
Source: SVT

== Riksdag elections ==
Year	%	Votes	V	S	MP	C	L	KD	M	SD	NyD	Left	Right
1973	91.1	10,783	5.5	48.2		24.6	9.7	3.5	8.0			53.7	45.8
1976	92.2	11,533	4.6	47.3		25.9	10.6	2.6	8.9			51.9	45.4
1979	91.1	11,745	4.9	49.0		18.9	10.3	3.0	13.5			53.9	42.7
1982	91.9	12,039	5.2	52.1	1.3	16.1	5.7	4.1	15.4			57.3	37.2
1985	91.0	12,030	4.8	51.8	1.2	16.2	12.7		12.9			56.6	41.8
1988	87.3	11,624	6.0	50.0	3.6	12.7	11.3	5.2	10.8			59.6	34.8
1991	88.8	12,111	5.0	43.0	2.0	9.6	8.3	9.8	15.0		7.0	48.0	42.7
1994	87.8	12,127	7.3	50.9	4.0	8.0	6.8	6.5	14.5		1.4	61.2	35.8
1998	82.8	11,489	13.0	43.6	3.3	5.9	4.2	12.1	15.9			59.9	38.1
2002	82.4	11,573	7.8	48.5	3.1	7.2	9.3	10.4	10.1	2.2		59.4	37.0
2006	84.6	12,011	4.7	47.3	2.9	7.4	6.1	8.9	16.5	4.4		54.9	38.9
2010	86.6	13,022	4.2	41.1	4.7	5.2	6.3	6.9	23.4	7.2		50.0	41.8
2014	87.7	13,529	4.3	38.2	5.0	5.1	5.0	5.8	18.0	16.3		47.5	33.9
2018	88.6	13,948	5.6	32.6	2.7	7.1	5.0	8.0	16.9	21.1		47.9	50.9
2022	86.9	14,141	4.3	33.2	2.6	5.6	4.7	5.6	17.3	25.6		45.6	53.2

== Twin towns ==
Kumla's three twin towns with the year of its establishing:

1. (1968) Frederikssund Municipality, Denmark
2. (1981) Sipoo (Sibbo), Finland
3. (1988) Aurskog-Høland, Norway
