= Örebro Municipality =

Örebro Municipality Örebro kommun
- Municipality
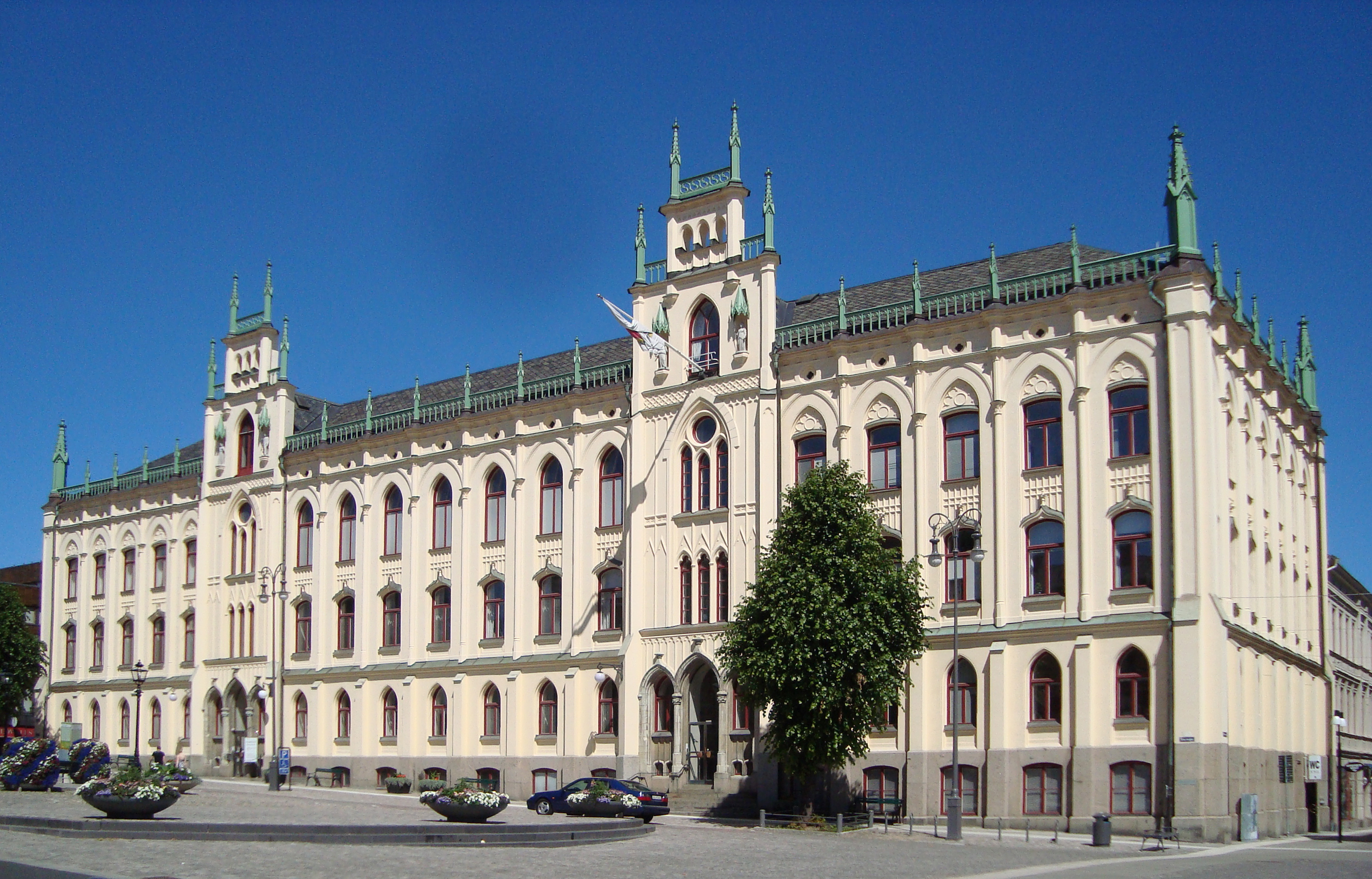
- Örebro Town Hall

- Coat of arms

- Coordinates: 59°16′N 15°13′E
- Country: Sweden
- County: Örebro County
- Seat: Örebro

Area
  - Total: 1,620.6 km^{2} (625.7 sq mi)
  - Land: 1,373.15 km^{2} (530.18 sq mi)
  - Water: 247.45 km^{2} (95.54 sq mi)
- Area as of 1 January 2014.

Population (30 June 2025)
  - Total: 160,143
  - Density: 116.625/km^{2} (302.056/sq mi)
- Time zone: UTC+1 (CET)
  - Summer (DST): UTC+2 (CEST)
- ISO 3166 code: SE
- Province: Närke and Västmanland
- Municipal code: 1880
- Website: www.orebro.se

Örebro Municipality (Swedish: Örebro kommun) is a municipality in Örebro County in central Sweden. Its seat is located in the city of Örebro.

The municipality was created from the City of Örebro and surrounding rural municipalities in 1971 and with some areas added in 1974 it had an area of 1,840 km^{2}. In 1995 the municipality was split in two when Lekeberg Municipality was recreated in its boundaries from 1967.

== Localities ==
Towns and localities with at least 200 inhabitants (31 December 2023):

- Örebro 128,658 (seat)
- Vintrosa 3,156 (partly in Lekeberg Municipality)
- Hovsta 2,734
- Ekeby-Almby 2,192
- Garphyttan 1,602
- Odensbacken 1,275
- Norra Bro 1,086
- Stora Mellösa 829
- Glanshammar 784
- Latorpsbruk 776
- Ölmbrotorp 508
- Hampetorp 306
- Askersby 243
- Sjöboviken 213

== Demographics ==
=== Population development ===
Population development in Örebro Municipality 1970–2020
Year	Population
1970	117,696
1975	117,837
1980	116,969
1985	118,043
1990	120,944
1995	119,635
2000	124,207
2005	127,733
2010	135,460
2015	144,200
2020	156,381
Source: SCB - Folkmängd efter region och år.

=== 2022 population by district ===
This is a demographic table based on Örebro Municipality's electoral districts in the 2022 Swedish general election sourced from SVT's election platform, in turn taken from SCB official statistics.

In total there were 117,940 Swedish citizen adults eligible to vote. The political demographics were 52.1% for the left coalition and 46.1% for the right coalition. Indicators are in percentage points except population totals and income.

Location	Residents	Citizen adults	Left vote	Right vote	Employed	Swedish parents	Foreign heritage	Income SEK	Degree
Location			%	%					
Adolfsberg V	1,906	1,353	41.4	58.0	89	87	13	35,805	64
Adolfsberg Ö	1,570	1,178	48.4	51.3	88	91	9	32,191	63
Almby	1,269	963	56.2	42.7	76	85	15	25,262	66
Asker	864	677	36.5	62.7	86	95	5	23,963	25
Axberg	1,842	1,396	45.3	53.1	88	91	9	29,153	41
Baronbackarna	2,161	1,354	69.4	25.3	59	34	66	15,458	26
Bettorp	1,163	918	47.2	52.2	88	77	23	30,417	56
Birgitta	1,549	1,344	52.5	46.0	82	85	15	27,287	60
Björkhaga	1,775	1,318	57.8	40.8	82	84	16	27,970	52
Brickebacken N	1,521	932	60.4	33.4	54	36	64	13,555	32
Brickebacken S	1,935	1,190	62.5	35.2	58	39	61	16,218	27
Brickeberg	1,627	1,126	54.9	42.7	72	63	37	24,912	58
Bromsplan	1,423	1,191	56.4	41.8	75	78	22	23,551	46
Brunnsgärdet	1,749	1,408	50.6	48.3	90	87	13	29,178	55
Centralstationen	1,515	1,292	52.5	45.6	81	76	24	24,989	50
Centrum	1,545	1,341	52.8	46.2	83	83	17	28,103	52
Ekeby Almby	2,416	1,487	42.9	56.8	92	87	13	35,895	66
Eklunda	1,499	1,204	46.6	52.8	84	88	12	31,002	60
Ervalla	1,165	878	43.2	55.6	86	92	8	26,942	33
Eyra	1,488	1,268	46.2	53.0	83	84	16	29,488	58
Gamla Hjärsta	1,472	1,090	56.1	43.7	82	76	24	29,320	53
Glanshammar-Ödeby	2,120	1,658	44.4	54.7	89	94	6	28,430	42
Grönpepparparken	1,876	1,373	50.4	48.8	76	69	31	25,582	55
Gustavsvik	1,270	1,509	41.0	58.4	82	77	23	25,771	59
Gällersta	2,032	1,487	41.2	57.3	87	86	14	30,551	48
Hagaby-Ringstorp	1,481	1,157	48.5	50.8	88	91	9	32,276	57
Hagastrand	997	923	55.0	44.8	81	82	18	25,893	48
Heden	1,253	966	44.3	53.5	72	49	51	22,644	35
Hovsta V	1,525	1,080	53.4	44.9	89	89	11	32,113	63
Hovsta Ö	1,539	1,088	52.9	45.9	87	86	14	29,100	55
Karla	1,934	1,493	58.1	39.8	76	64	36	21,174	44
Karlslund	1,481	1,165	53.0	46.0	84	76	24	25,396	43
Kil	1,290	1,012	43.3	55.9	89	91	9	28,563	43
Kilsmo-Brevens Bruk	730	599	40.4	57.9	72	87	13	19,985	24
Krämartorget	1,439	1,274	56.8	40.7	73	70	30	22,231	39
Ladugårdsängen V	1,889	1,494	55.4	42.7	80	79	21	26,357	53
Ladugårdsängen Ö	1,576	1,316	50.6	47.6	82	78	22	25,987	50
Lillkyrka	920	692	47.5	51.5	89	93	7	27,857	44
Lillån V	1,816	1,283	48.3	50.2	88	81	19	29,486	51
Lillån Ö	2,062	1,429	47.4	51.7	88	87	13	33,287	59
Lindhult	1,777	1,312	41.1	57.6	88	84	16	29,209	49
Lundby N	1,473	1,162	58.4	39.8	82	60	40	23,873	39
Lundby S	1,382	1,026	51.3	47.2	79	62	38	25,151	39
Längbrotorg	1,335	1,116	56.9	41.6	79	80	20	24,151	45
Lännäs-Vinön	958	827	42.1	56.6	81	91	9	23,863	37
Marieberg	1,851	1,295	42.4	56.8	91	90	10	31,651	48
Markbacken	1,358	819	66.0	30.8	63	32	68	16,640	30
Mellringe	1,553	1,171	44.7	54.2	84	77	23	26,806	45
Mikael	1,406	1,111	54.6	43.6	83	83	17	28,149	50
Mosås	2,121	1,418	41.8	57.4	88	86	14	30,234	48
Nasta	1,642	1,280	46.9	52.4	86	88	12	31,105	53
Norrby	1,542	1,102	58.1	39.5	69	65	35	19,782	37
Norrbyås	753	588	45.2	54.2	89	92	8	29,773	44
Nya Hjärsta	1,603	1,171	50.6	48.3	87	69	31	30,415	50
Nyponlunden	1,380	1,003	42.8	56.2	81	49	51	27,533	43
Näbbtorget	1,406	1,190	55.8	42.5	67	67	33	19,598	39
Näsby	1,756	1,254	56.8	42.5	85	86	14	31,771	69
Odensbacken	1,741	1,374	39.9	59.0	78	87	13	22,217	28
Olaus Petri	1,226	1,056	58.5	39.7	69	70	30	19,422	34
Ormesta	1,339	929	49.4	50.2	89	90	10	32,294	63
Oskarsparken	1,468	1,330	52.7	46.5	78	88	12	26,819	57
Oxhagen	2,129	1,294	67.5	25.7	57	21	79	14,214	25
Rinkaby	718	532	47.5	50.1	89	94	6	30,493	47
Rosta V	1,549	1,160	59.5	38.1	72	77	23	23,840	41
Rosta Ö	1,606	1,296	58.6	40.7	78	79	21	24,771	48
Rudbeck	1,426	1,282	50.6	48.1	74	81	19	23,650	56
Rynninge	1,545	1,207	54.8	45.1	90	89	11	34,291	66
Rynningeåsen	1,742	1,273	59.9	39.5	85	83	17	29,041	65
Slottet	1,137	977	50.0	49.3	81	84	16	28,859	50
Sofia	1,089	991	50.4	48.6	80	84	16	26,250	57
Solhaga	1,272	1,054	65.2	33.9	79	78	22	22,545	45
Stadsparken	1,375	1,219	50.4	49.1	78	86	14	26,335	58
Stora Mellösa	2,088	1,614	46.3	52.4	85	94	6	25,659	39
Svampen	1,697	1,193	56.7	41.9	83	78	22	27,683	56
Södermalm	1,515	1,154	55.7	42.0	70	59	41	22,272	39
Sörby N	1,380	1,157	51.0	48.3	84	88	12	29,786	59
Sörby S	1,527	1,170	53.7	45.3	79	84	16	28,954	62
Sörbyängen N	1,385	1,078	54.4	44.6	85	81	19	29,153	58
Sörbyängen S	1,483	1,110	57.2	41.9	73	75	25	25,249	56
Tegnér	1,609	1,347	56.2	42.5	79	77	23	25,532	52
Trängen	1,465	1,136	60.9	37.6	71	59	41	23,751	38
Tybble	1,368	1,063	57.2	40.7	68	64	36	20,197	34
Tybblelund	1,931	1,363	52.5	46.1	78	86	14	29,846	73
Tysslinge-Garphyttan	1,995	1,473	52.7	46.7	84	88	12	27,763	41
Tysslinge-Latorp	1,412	1,025	53.3	45.7	90	94	6	29,477	48
Universitetet	1,873	1,474	60.4	37.5	38	64	36	5,477	79
Universitetssjukhuset	1,457	1,189	52.2	46.7	73	78	22	23,158	52
Varberga V	1,965	1,094	63.5	30.8	57	20	80	15,537	27
Varberga Ö	1,691	837	56.8	36.0	52	16	84	12,671	28
Vasastan M	1,497	1,312	55.4	43.0	77	76	24	21,399	43
Vasastan N	1,577	1,260	56.6	40.7	76	74	26	23,227	40
Vasastan S	1,461	1,271	54.0	45.2	80	85	15	24,869	49
Vintrosa	2,152	1,595	44.8	54.6	89	93	7	28,721	41
Vivalla N	2,211	1,181	67.7	16.6	49	15	85	12,136	23
Vivalla V	2,230	922	67.8	15.4	47	12	88	10,671	20
Vivalla Ö	2,658	1,466	70.8	11.8	46	12	88	11,084	17
Västhaga	1,437	1,216	56.0	42.5	64	68	32	18,067	30
Åkullen	1,384	1,162	57.1	41.2	75	76	24	22,641	44
Örnsro	1,599	1,354	56.9	41.4	72	72	28	22,096	42
Österplan	1,283	999	50.1	47.8	79	82	18	26,491	61
Source: SVT

== Elections ==
From the 1994 election onwards there was a boundary change due to the split with Lekeberg Municipality. The exact results of Sweden Democrats were not listed at a municipal level by SCB from 1988 to 1998 due to the party's small size at the time. "Turnout" denotes the percentage of eligible people casting any ballots, whereas "Votes" denotes the number of valid votes only.

=== Riksdag ===
Year	Turnout	Votes	V	S	MP	C	L	KD	M	SD	NyD	Left	Right
1973	90.3	77,604	3.9	45.5		24.3	11.6	2.2	11.9			49.4	47.8
1976	91.5	80,670	4.1	44.5		23.8	12.3	1.6	13.2			48.6	49.3
1979	90.0	78,995	5.2	44.3		17.3	11.9	2.0	18.2			49.5	47.4
1982	91.0	80,089	5.5	47.2	1.8	14.7	6.8	2.9	20.8			52.7	42.3
1985	89.6	80,290	5.4	44.8	1.8	11.9	16.8		18.0			50.2	46.7
1988	86.5	78,201	6.4	43.2	5.0	10.1	15.3	3.9	15.0			54.6	40.4
1991	87.3	79,566	4.9	38.2	3.3	6.8	11.9	9.5	17.9		6.7	43.1	46.1
1994	87.6	76,606	6.7	46.2	5.2	5.3	9.7	5.8	18.7	1.4		58.1	39.5
1998	82.4	73,648	12.5	38.0	5.1	3.8	6.5	12.3	19.2			55.6	41.8
2002	82.4	76,771	8.9	41.7	5.2	4.6	14.2	10.1	12.0	1.8		55.8	40.9
2006	83.7	80,630	6.0	38.0	6.0	6.3	8.7	8.1	21.0	3.5		50.0	44.1
2010	86.2	87,778	5.8	34.1	5.8	4.8	7.6	7.0	26.0	5.5		45.7	45.4
2014	86.9	92,429	5.7	32.4	8.4	5.1	5.4	6.2	21.0	11.6		46.5	37.7
2018	87.8	98,428	8.5	31.5	4.8	8.1	5.7	7.7	17.9	14.4		52.8	45.7

== Twin towns ==
Örebro's seven twin towns with the year of its establishing:

1. (1946) Kolding Municipality, Denmark
2. (1946) Drammen, Norway
3. (1947) Lappeenranta (Villmanstrand), Finland
4. (1979) Stykkishólmur, Iceland
5. (2001) Łódź, Poland
6. (2002) Yantai, China
7. (2003) Terrassa, Spain

== See also ==
- Statistics Sweden
- Nerikes Allehanda (newspaper)
- Julmust (Christmas beverage)
- List of hundreds of Sweden
