= Örebro County =

County (län) of Sweden

Coordinates: 59°16′00″N 15°13′00″E

Örebro County Örebro län (Swedish)
- County
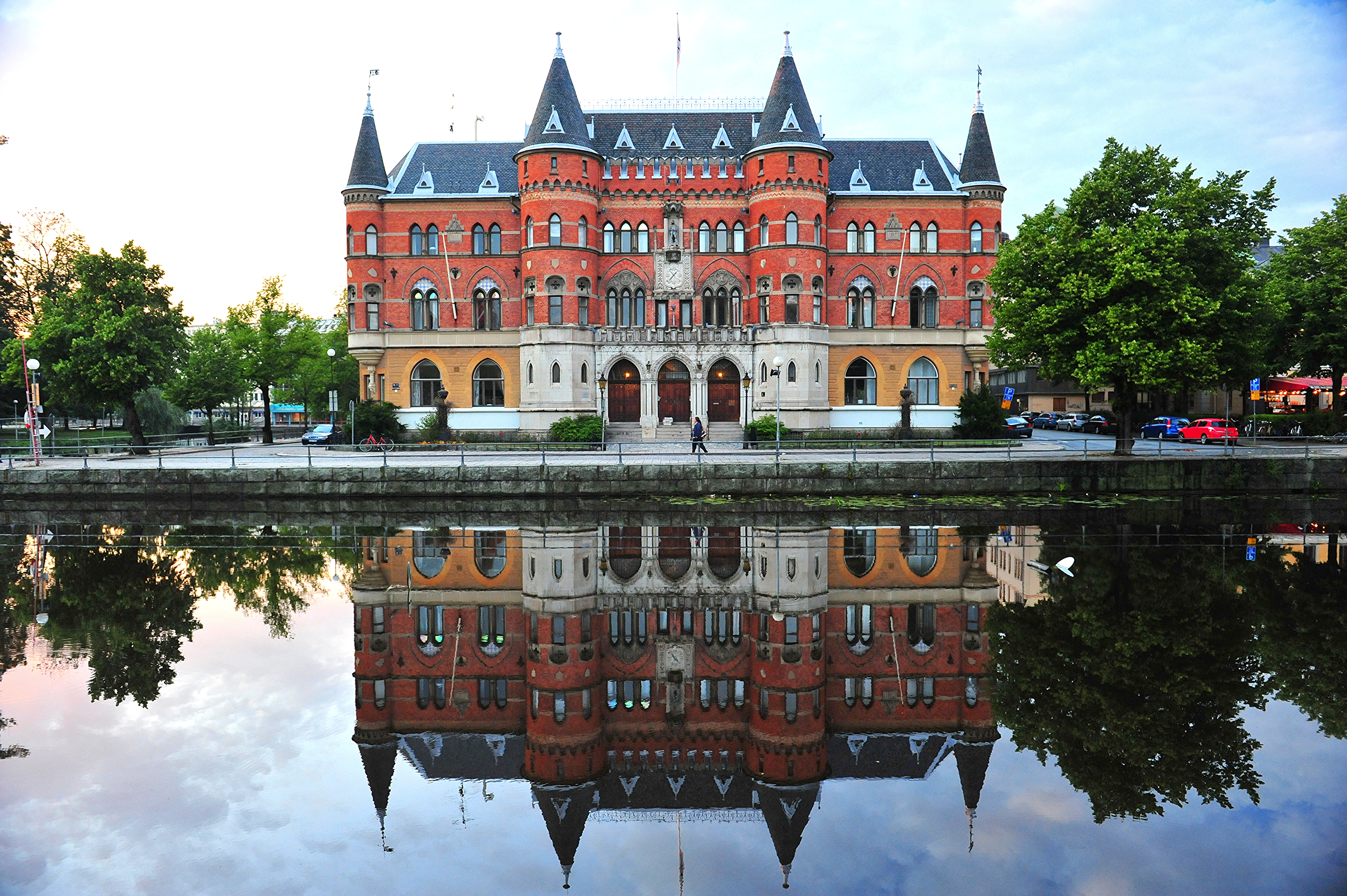

- Flag Coat of arms

- Örebro County in Sweden

- Location map of Örebro County in Sweden
- Country: Sweden
- Founded: 1634
- Capital: Örebro
- Municipalities: 12: Askersund; Degerfors; Hällefors; Hallsberg; Karlskoga; Kumla; Laxå; Lekeberg; Lindesberg; Ljusnarsberg; Nora; Örebro

Government
  - Governor: Lena Rådström Baastad (Social Democrats)
  - Council: Region Örebro County

Area
  - Total: 8,545.6 km^{2} (3,299.5 sq mi)

Population (31 December 2023)
  - Total: 308,116
  - Density: 36.056/km^{2} (93.383/sq mi)

GDP
  - Total: SEK 104 billion €11.154 billion (2015)
- Time zone: UTC+1 (CET)
  - Summer (DST): UTC+2 (CEST)
- ISO 3166 code: SE-T
- NUTS Region: SE124
- Website: www.t.lst.se

Örebro County (Swedish: Örebro län, pronounced [œrɛˈbruː ˈlɛːn]) is a county or län in central Sweden. It borders the counties of Västra Götaland, Värmland, Dalarna, Västmanland, Södermanland and Östergötland. It is frequently culturally divided into the hilly northern region of Bergslagen, where mining and metallurgic industry have been important since the Middle Ages, and the southern Mälardalen of lakes and farms.

== Province ==
Sweden's counties are primarily administrative units, whereas the provinces of Sweden usually fit cultural and historical boundaries. Örebro County consists of the province of Närke, the western half of Västmanland and minor parts of eastern Värmland and northeastern Västergötland. Örebro County is named after its capital city, Örebro, which in 2010 was the sixth largest city of Sweden. Official 2010 numbers sourced in the localities section indicate that 38% of the county population is living in the city of Örebro alone. Örebro itself contains just as many inhabitants as the 23 other largest localities put together, and has grown significantly ever since the official statistics began in the late 1960s.

== Administration ==
The county was named Närke and Värmland County until 1779 when Värmland County seceded.

The main aim of the County Administrative Board is to fulfil the goals set in national politics by the Riksdag and the Government, to coordinate the interests of the county, to promote the development of the county, to establish regional goals and safeguard the due process of law in the handling of each case. The County Administrative Board is a Government Agency headed by a Governor. See List of Örebro Governors.

== Politics ==
The County Council of Örebro or Örebro läns landsting, which is appointed by the electorate of the county, is primarily responsible for health care and public transportation.

== Riksdag elections ==
The table details all Riksdag election results of Örebro County since the unicameral era began in 1970. The blocs denote which party would support the Prime Minister or the lead opposition party towards the end of the elected parliament.

Year	Turnout	Votes	V	S	MP	C	L	KD	M	SD	NyD	Left	Right
1970	88.4	174,031	4.3	51.1		20.1	14.3	2.2	7.6			55.4	41.9
1973	90.9	177,310	4.8	49.8		23.6	9.2	2.3	9.6			54.6	42.7
1976	91.9	184,721	4.3	48.7		24.0	10.0	1.7	10.8			53.0	44.8
1979	90.7	183,059	5.3	49.2		17.9	10.0	2.0	14.9			54.4	42.8
1982	91.5	185,686	5.4	52.2	1.5	14.9	5.6	2.8	17.4			57.6	37.9
1985	90.1	184,019	5.4	50.6	1.6	12.6	13.5		15.5			56.0	41.7
1988	86.5	176,006	6.6	49.0	4.4	10.7	12.3	3.6	12.8			60.0	35.8
1991	86.9	177,453	5.2	43.5	2.8	7.8	9.4	8.3	15.7		6.7	48.7	41.2
1994	87.2	178,636	7.1	50.8	4.6	6.9	7.4	5.0	16.3		1.2	62.5	35.5
1998	81.9	166,371	13.6	42.1	4.3	5.0	4.8	11.3	16.7			60.0	37.8
2002	81.2	166,597	8.9	46.5	4.2	6.4	11.2	9.0	10.7	1.7		59.6	37.4
2006	82.8	171,303	7.2	43.1	4.6	7.5	6.6	7.2	18.8	3.8		53.8	40.1
2010	85.6	182,378	5.7	38.8	6.5	5.4	6.3	6.2	24.0	6.1		51.0	41.8
2014	86.7	188,704	5.4	36.9	6.4	5.6	4.3	5.2	18.6	14.4		48.6	33.6
2018	87.7	195,157	7.6	33.1	3.7	7.8	4.6	6.9	16.6	18.2		52.2	46.3
2022	84.7	196,504	6.1	33.3	4.1	6.3	4.6	5.3	16.7	22.1		49.8	48.7

== Geography and climate ==
The southern Närke plain, the forested north and the highland to the west makes for a varying landscape. Örebro County is located between the four major lakes of Sweden and has coastlines on two of them. Capital Örebro is alongside Hjälmaren, located slightly inland along the Svartån river. The southern area of the county has a transitional climate between oceanic and continental, with warm summers and cold, variable winters. Örebro has a July high of around 23 °C (73 °F) and winter highs around 0 °C (32 °F) with frosts being frequent from November to April. The proximity to the major lakes moderates winter temperatures somewhat, undermining the continental effects of its inland position. The northern areas of the county are slightly cooler year-round. The summer temperatures on the Närke Plain are some of the warmest in all of Scandinavia and by extension Northern Europe.

== Municipalities ==
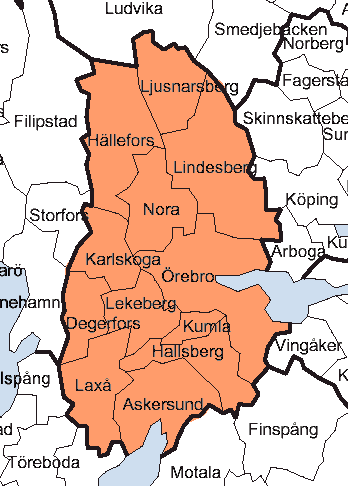

Örebro County is divided into 12 municipalities.

Municipality	Population (2017)
Askersund	11,175
Degerfors	9,668
Hällefors	7,109
Hallsberg	15,932
Karlskoga	30,413
Kumla	21,506
Laxå	5,643
Lekeberg	7,868
Lindesberg	23,613
Ljusnarsberg	3,016
Nora	10,747
Örebro	150,291
Source: Statistics Sweden

== Localities (2018 Statistics Sweden estimates) ==
Pos	Locality	Population
1	Örebro	124 027
2	Karlskoga	27 562
3	Kumla	17 089
4	Lindesberg	9 732
5	Hallsberg	8 457
6	Degerfors	7 371
7	Nora	6 773
8	Hällefors	4 506
9	Askersund	4 172
10	Laxå	3 119
11	Kopparberg	3 028
12	Hovsta	2 786
13	Vintrosa	2 725
14	Frövi	2 534
15	Fjugesta	2 336
16	Ekeby-Almby	2 143
17	Storå	1 917
18	Pålsboda	1 686
19	Garphyttan	1 544
20	Åsbro	1 457
21	Fellingsbro	1 393
22	Odensbacken	1 338
23	Sköllersta	1 091
Source: Statistics Sweden

== Demographics ==
=== Population ===
Population development in Örebro County 1970–2020
Year	Population
1970	275,490
1975	273,923
1980	274,356
1985	270,211
1990	272,513
1995	276,417
2000	273,615
2005	274,121
2010	280,230
2015	291,012
2020	305,643

=== Foreign background ===
SCB have collected statistics on backgrounds of residents since 2002. These tables consist of all who have two foreign-born parents or are born abroad themselves. The chart lists election years and the last year on record alone.

Location	2002	2006	2010	2014	2018	2019
Askersund	5.5	6.1	6.4	7.9	10.3	10.7
Degerfors	11.2	12.2	13.8	15.5	19.4	19.8
Hallsberg	8.8	10.3	11.9	13.8	19.5	20.2
Hällefors	15.3	17.0	18.7	20.7	26.1	26.6
Karlskoga	13.4	14.5	15.4	19.1	21.4	21.8
Kumla	9.8	11.3	12.7	14.4	16.7	17.1
Laxå	13.9	13.5	12.8	18.0	21.2	21.5
Lekeberg	4.6	4.8	4.7	5.1	8.0	8.5
Lindesberg	10.0	11.5	13.6	16.7	20.0	20.1
Ljusnarsberg	11.1	12.6	14.7	20.1	23.7	23.3
Nora	8.7	10.2	11.7	13.2	17.4	17.4
Örebro	16.0	17.8	20.4	22.3	25.3	26.2
Total	13.0	14.5	16.5	18.7	22.0	22.6
Source: SCB

== Heraldry ==
The arms for the County of Örebro is a combination of the arms of Närke, Västmanland and Värmland. When it is shown with a royal crown it represents the County Administrative Board.

== See also ==
- Duke of Närke, a title for members of the royal family (see Duchies in Sweden)
