= Närke =

Historical province of Sweden

Coordinates: 59°14′35″N 15°16′16″E

- Historical province
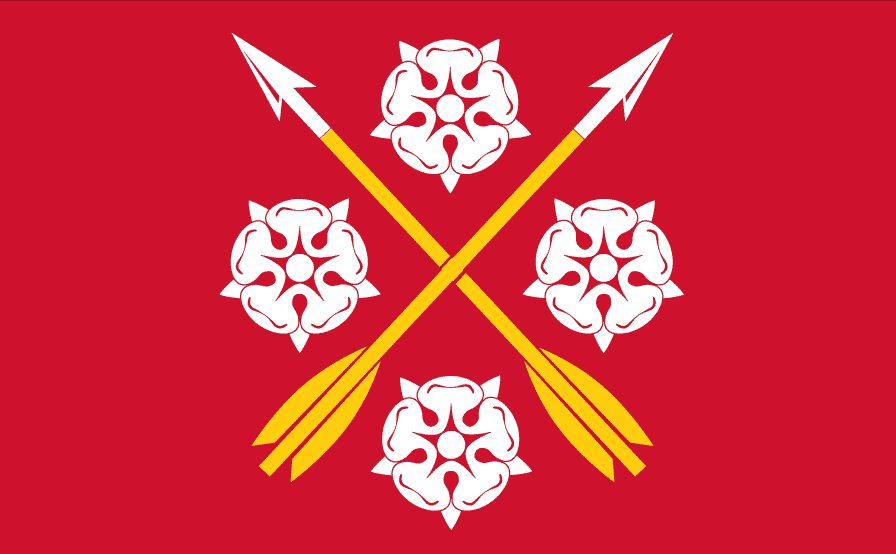
- Flag Coat of arms

- Country: Sweden
- Land: Svealand
- Counties: Örebro County; Västmanland County; Södermanland County

Area
  - Total: 4,122 km^{2} (1,592 sq mi)

Population (31 December 2023)
  - Total: 223,548
  - Density: 54.23/km^{2} (140.5/sq mi)

Ethnicity
  - Language: Swedish

Culture
  - Flower: Cowslip
  - Animal: Hazel dormouse
  - Bird: Yellow bunting
  - Fish: Pike
- Time zone: UTC+1 (CET)
  - Summer (DST): UTC+2 (CEST)

Närke (Swedish pronunciation: [ˈnæ̌rːkɛ]) is a Swedish traditional province, or landskap, situated in Svealand in south central Sweden. It is bordered by Västmanland to the north, Södermanland to the east, Östergötland to the southeast, Västergötland to the southwest, and Värmland to the northwest. Närke has a surface area of 4,126 km² and a total population of 208,376.

== Name ==
The name of the province (Neeric 1165-81) comes from an old word när (narrow) which refers to the narrow ridge where the church of Norrbyås (Nerboahs 1275) is situated. What the rest of the name means is not clear. In English sometimes also Nerike (an archaic spelling of the province) and Nericia (the Latin name) are used for the province.

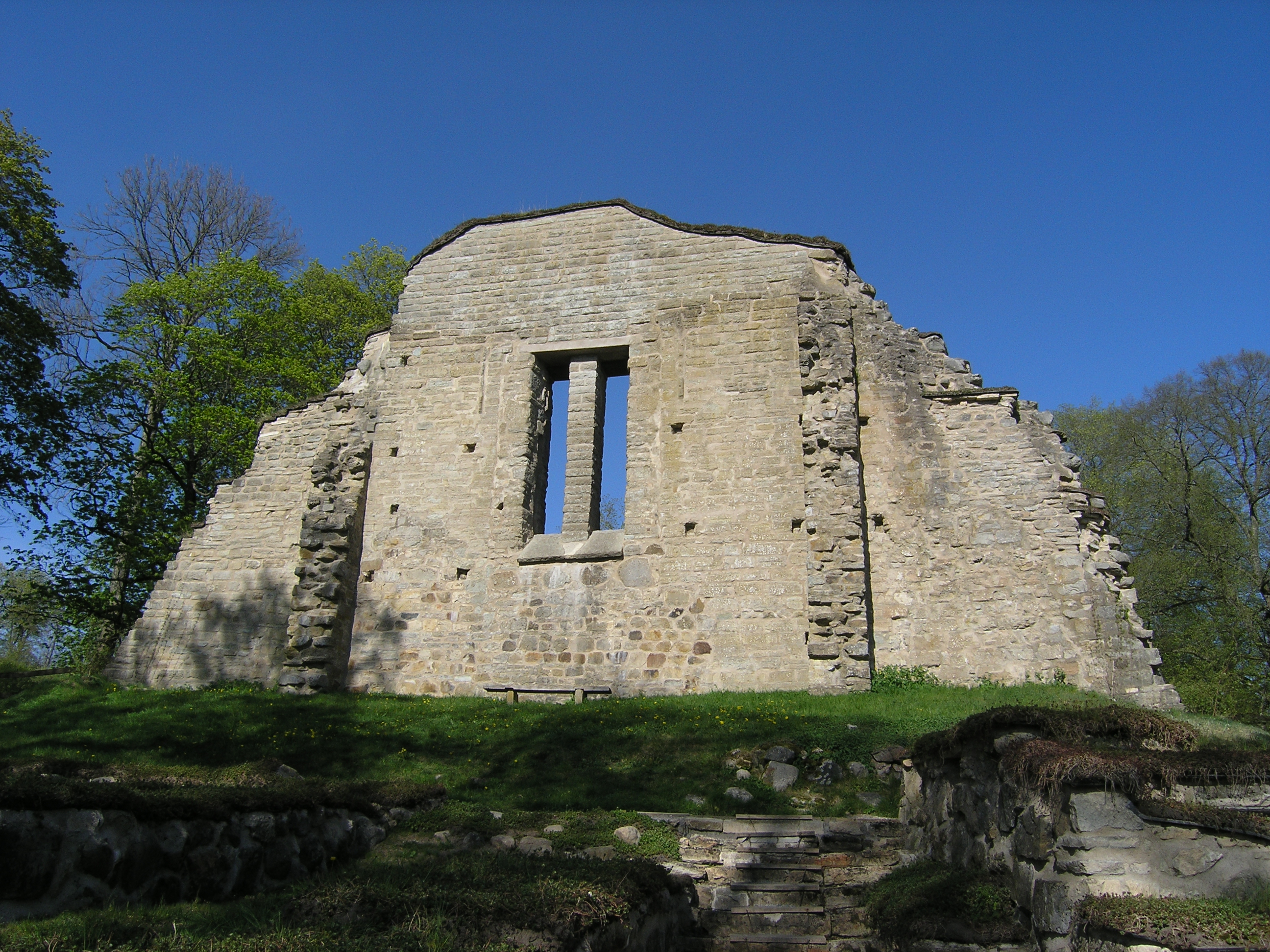
Riseberga Abbey Ruin in Lekeberg

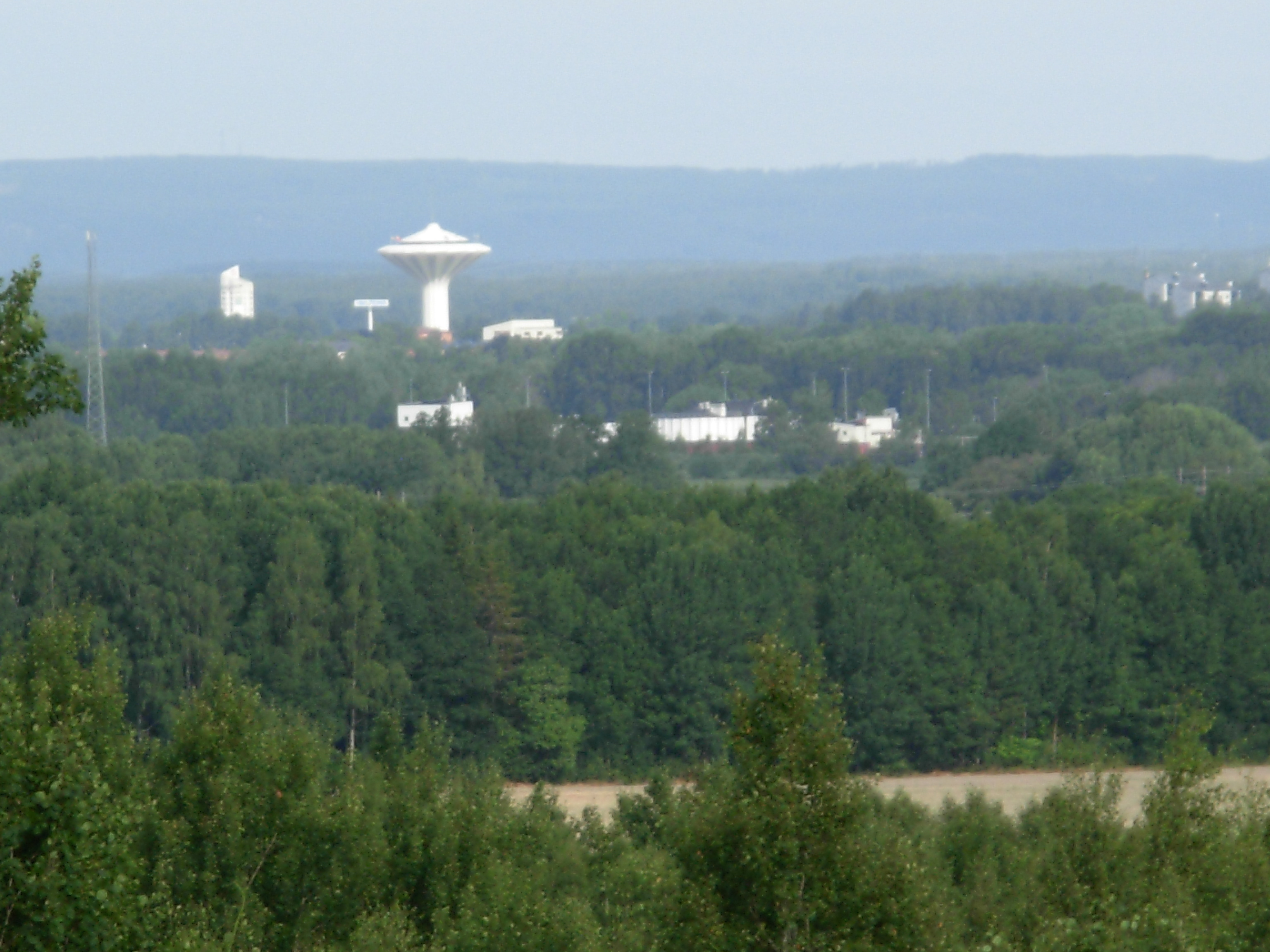
View over the surroundings of Örebro, Närke

== Administration ==
The traditional provinces of Sweden serve no administrative or political purposes, but are historical and cultural entities. In the case of Närke, the province makes up the southern part of Örebro County.

The following municipalities have their seats in Närke:

- Askersund
- Hallsberg
- Kumla
- Laxå
- Lekeberg
- Örebro

== Heraldry ==
Arms granted in 1560, and revised a decade or so later with the current one. The arms is represented with a ducal coronet. At the centre there are two crossbow bolts was - the crossbow being the favourite weapon of the peasants. Blazon: "Gules between four Roses Argent two Arrows in saltire Or points upward pointed Argent." The Närke arms is one of the components of the coat of arms for Örebro County, granted in 1944.

== Geography ==
- Highest mountain: Kilsbergen
- Largest lake: Vättern
- National parks: Garphyttan

The oldest city in Närke was Örebro, receiving its privileges around 1200. After that, Askersund was chartered in 1643 and Kumla in 1942. City status in Sweden was discontinued as of 1971, so these are historical titles.

== History ==
=== Prehistory ===
Norse mythology mentions three kings of Närke, Nidud, Olof the Sharp-sighted and Sporsnjall. Nidud was a villainous king in the lay of Wayland the smith, Olaf aided the Norwegian king Vikar in battle, and Sporsnjall was burnt to death by Ingjald Ill-ruler together with five other petty kings.

=== History ===
- The exiled Norwegian King Olaf the Holy stayed in Närke for some time, 1028–1029, with Sigtrygg, before departing for Kievan Rus' and its ruler Yaroslav I the Wise. Olaf may have initiated the Christianization of the province (see also Culture of Närke).
- In the year 1170, Närke was incorporated into the diocese of Strängnäs.
- In around 1200 A.D., the Castle of Örebro was built to protect the bridge crossing the ford (öre means "sand bank" and bro means "bridge"), as well as the borough on the south side of the bridge. It was to withstand many sieges, and acquired a reputation for being impregnable.
- In 1316 the future Saint Birgitta of Sweden, known outside of Sweden as Princess of Nericia, was married to Ulf Gudmarson, Lord of Närke, to whom she bore eight children, one of whom was St Catherine of Sweden.
- In 1435, Engelbrekt Engelbrektsson, the leader of a popular uprising against the German sheriffs, was given the castle of Örebro as a fief. In the following year he was assassinated.
- From 1525 to 1554, it was a fiefdom belonging to Lars Siggesson Sparre. Later in belonged to Duke Charles from 1560 to 1598 and to his son Duke Charles Philip from 1611 to 1622.
- During the 16th and 17th centuries the territory was under a number of fiefs where iron bars were manufactured. As the farming activities gave very little, the iron manufacturing became even more attractive to the farmers, as well as trade with oxen. The oxen were sold in Bergslagen as well as Dalarna, where the skin of the oxen were important items in the mines.
- In 1653, it was the scene of the Morning Star Rebellion.
- The surplus of oxen was also one of the reasons why the shoe-making business took shape and became a most important industry in Närke up until the middle of the 20th century.

Närke was renowned for its warlike peasants and when coat-of-arms for the province was granted for the funeral of King Gustav Vasa in 1560 two crossbow darts was the central symbol, the crossbow being the favourite weapon of the peasants.

In Närke there are also a number of ancient castles. The most important and best preserved one is located in Tarsta at Sköllersta.

In the 16th and 17th centuries, as well as nominally in more recent times, the title of Duke of Närke has been in use.

== Culture ==
The province of Närke has 5,200 ancient remains.

== Historical subdivisions ==
The old subdivisions of provinces were the Hundreds of Sweden. In Närke, the hundreds were:

- Asker Hundred
- Edsberg Hundred
- Glanshammar Hundred
- Grimsten Hundred
- Hardemo Hundred
- Kumla Hundred
- Noraskoga Mountain District (transferred to Västmanland in 1617)
- Skyllersta Hundred
- Sundbo Hundred
- Örebro Hundred

== Sports ==
Football in the province is administered by Örebro Läns Fotbollförbund. Ice hockey is also popular, with Örebro HK, and bandy with Örebro SK.
