= Örebro–Skebäck Railway =

Standard gauge railway in Sweden

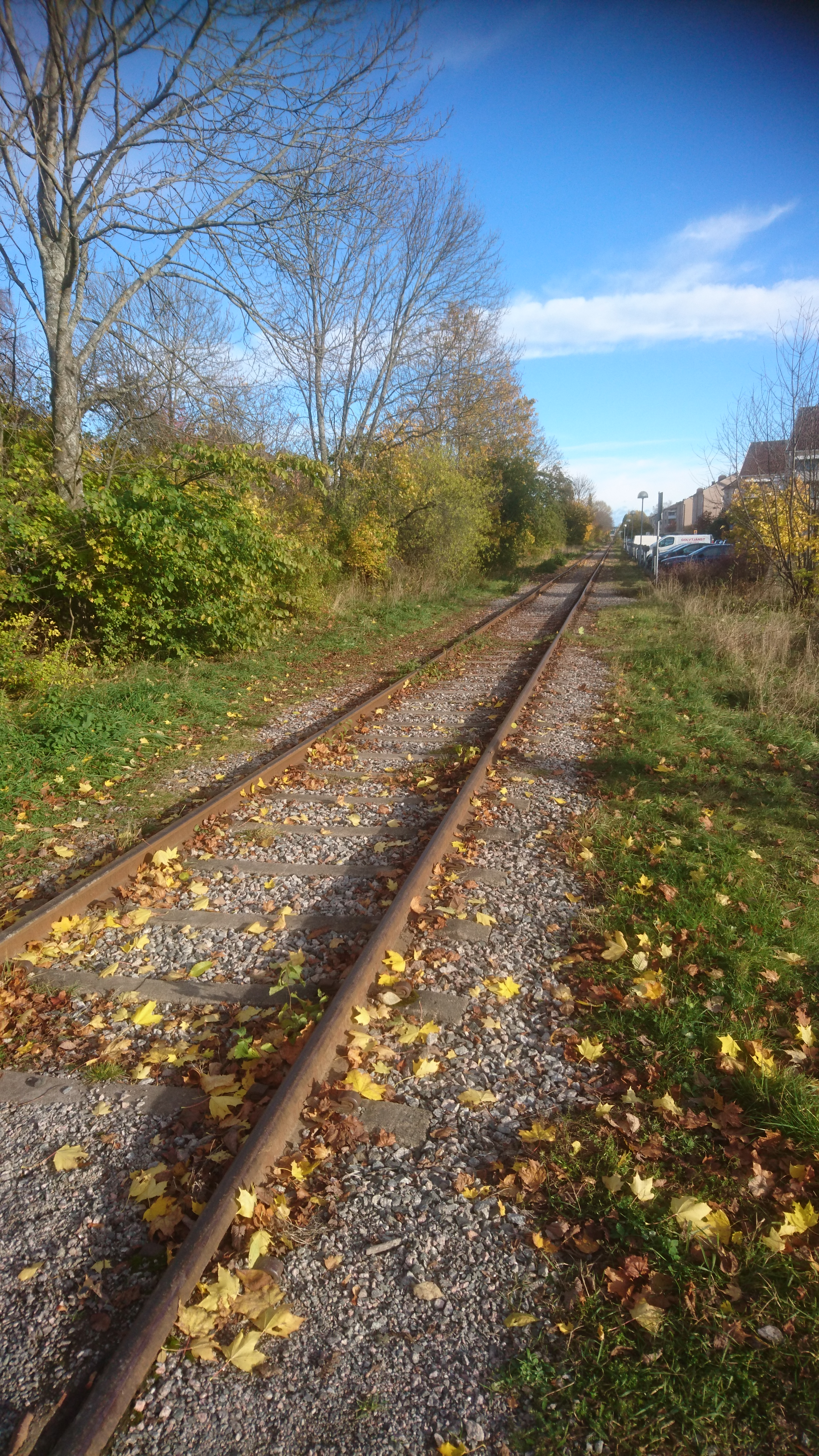
- Örebro–Skebäck Railway at Eklunda, autumn 2017

History
- Opened: 12 January 1904

Örebro–Skebäck Railway (Swedish: Örebro Skebäcks järnväg; ÖSkbJ) was a standard-gauge railway in Sweden, 4.1 km long, from Örebro S on the Krylbo–Mjölby Main Line, in an easterly direction to Skebäck at the city's old eastern harbor at Svartån. The line remains as a standard-gauge industrial track.

== History ==
A concession was granted to private individuals on 31 December 1901. On 25 April 1902, it was transferred to the Örebro–Skebäck Railway Company, and it opened for freight traffic on 12 January 1904. There was never any passenger traffic. The construction cost was 200,000 SEK. The line was equipped in 1908 with a third rail for the narrow-gauge traffic from Northern Östergötland Railways (NÖJ).

The company was fully owned by the city of Örebro on the same day the line opened for traffic. The railway had no rolling stock of its own, and operations were run by SJ and NÖJ.

Narrow-gauge traffic ceased in 1951 after the Swedish State purchased NÖJ and SJ moved coal transport to standard gauge between Norrköping and Örebro Gasworks. The third rail was soon removed. General freight traffic was discontinued on 1 January 1956.

After 1965, the line became an industrial track and still exists. Paper recycling moved in 2006 through a land swap with the municipality to Törsjö in Marieberg and the second-to-last freight customer, Örebro Paper Mill, closed its factory in 2010.

The line is now somewhat shortened. Regular traffic goes to Mondi Örebro, which produces waterproofing for packaging. The factory is located just under half a kilometer west of the former paper mill.
