= Brickebacken =

Suburb in Örebro, Sweden

Coordinates: 59.2408°N 15.2392°E

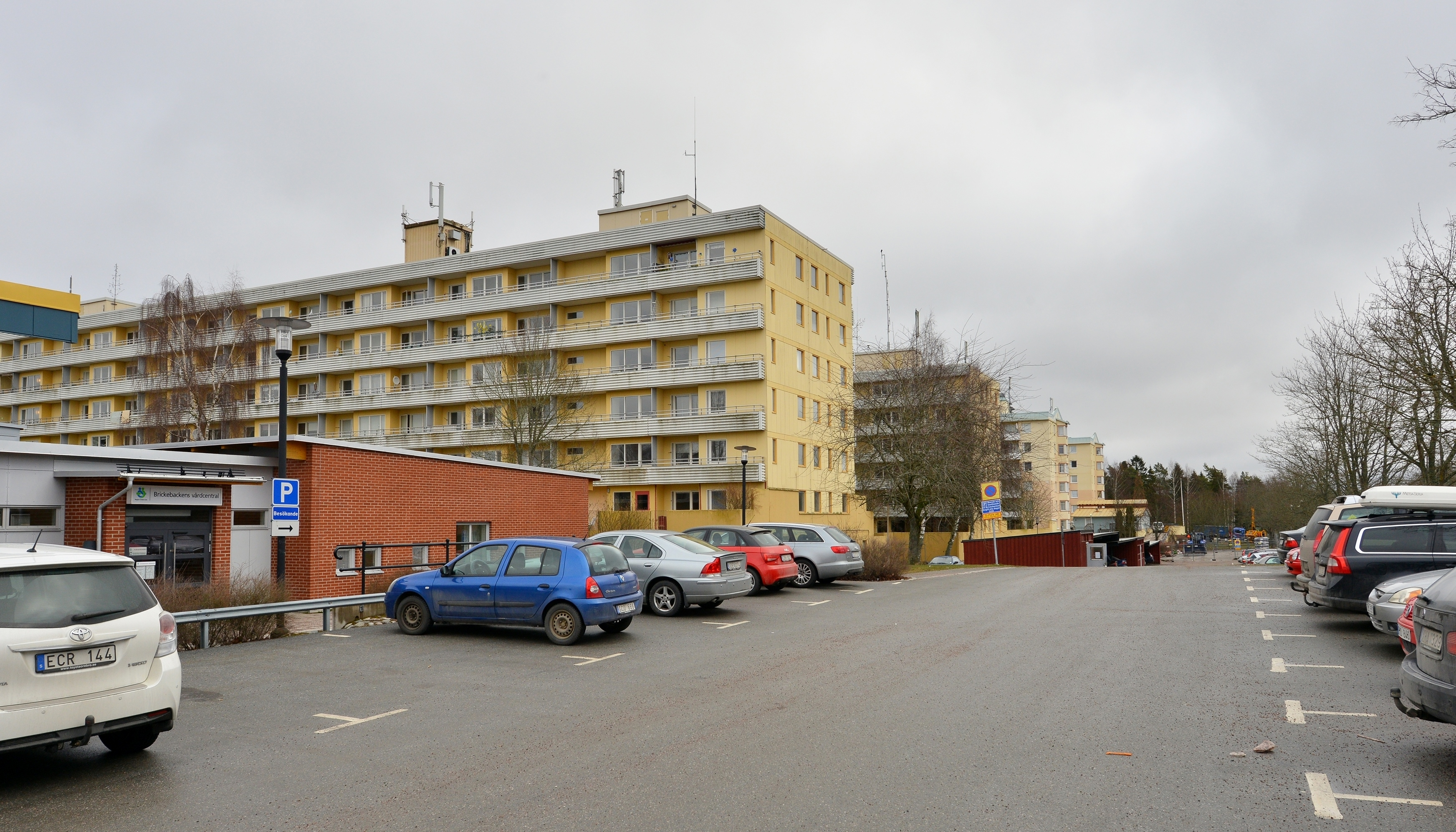
Apartments in Brickebacken

Brickebacken is a suburb to Örebro in Örebro County, Sweden, located 5 km south-east of the city center and is the cities highest located urban area. It has a smaller downtown of its own with basic services such as a grocery store, café, restaurant, school, library, medical clinic, dentist, gym and a swimming hall. There are several fields, parks and trails for recreation.

== Brickebacken IP ==
In Brickebacken there is a football field for IFK Örebro called Brickebacken IP.
