= Örebro =

City in Närke, Sweden

- City
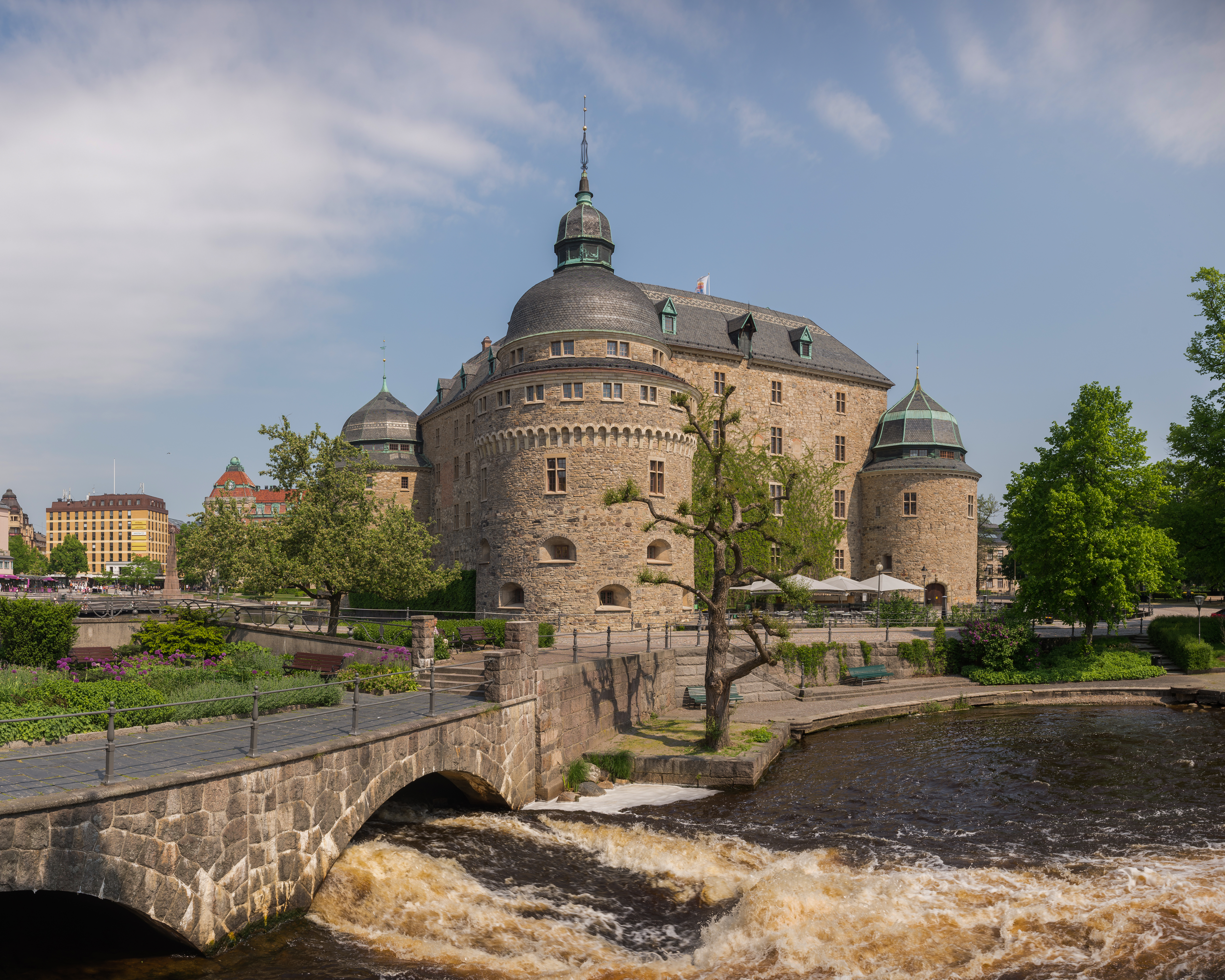
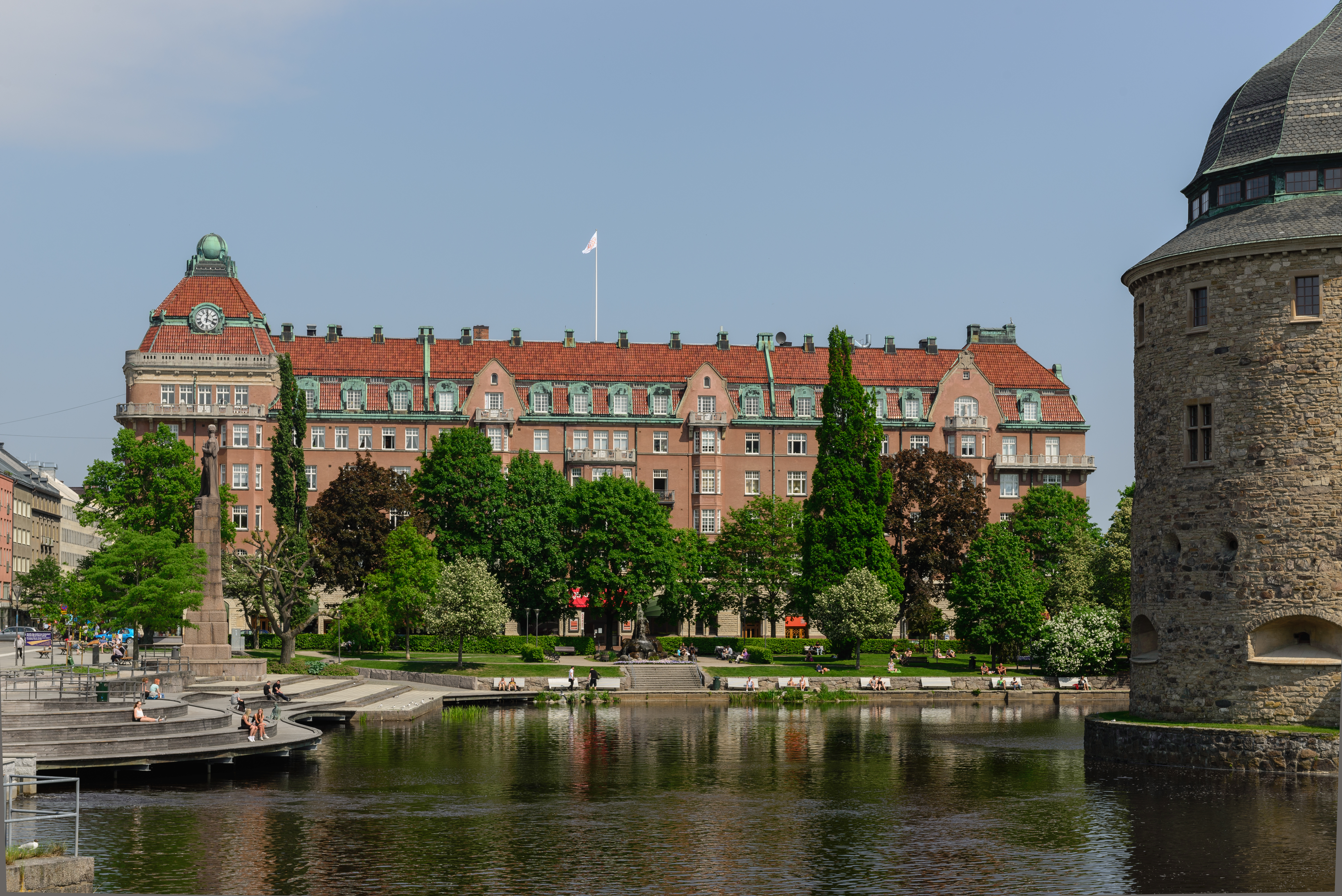
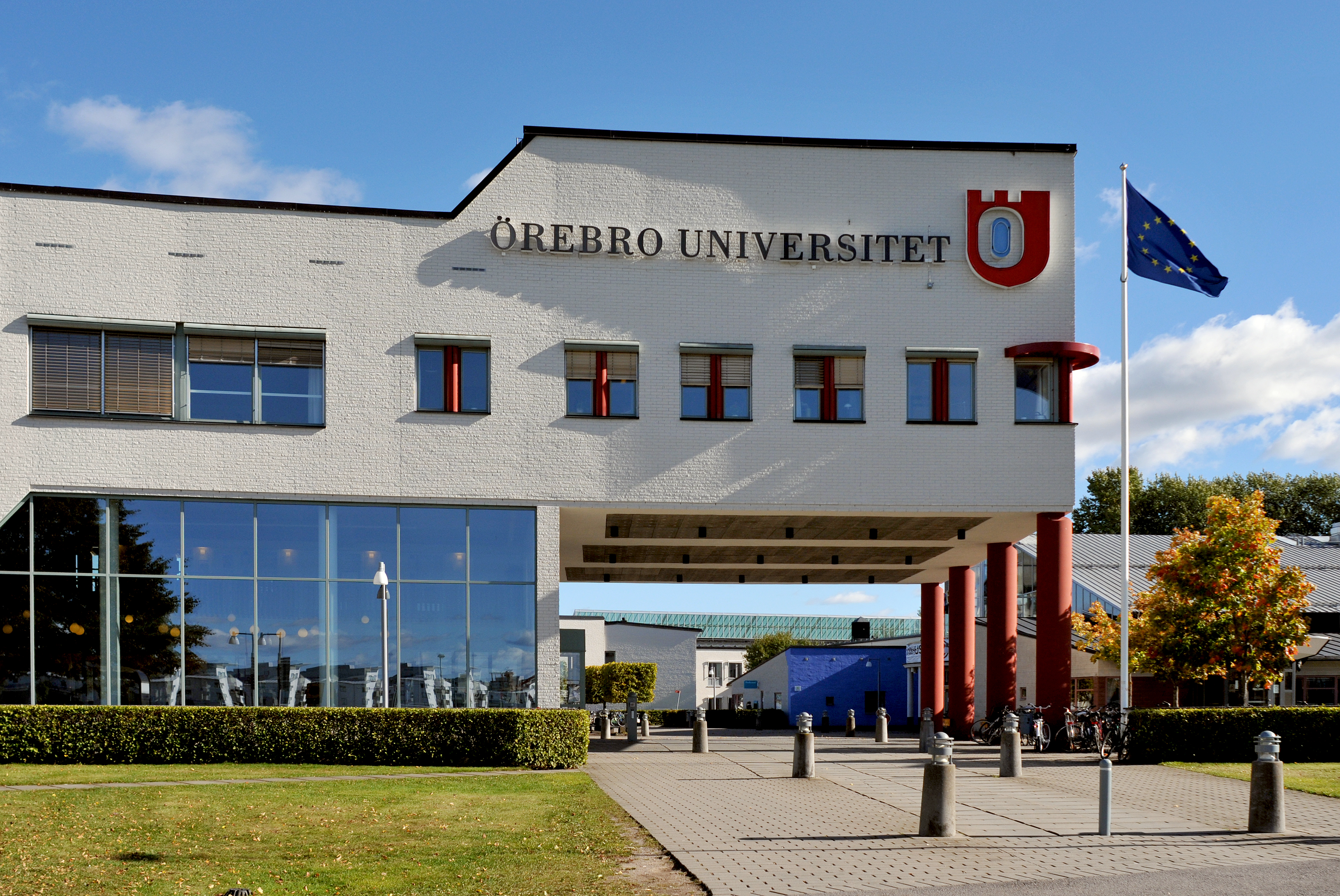
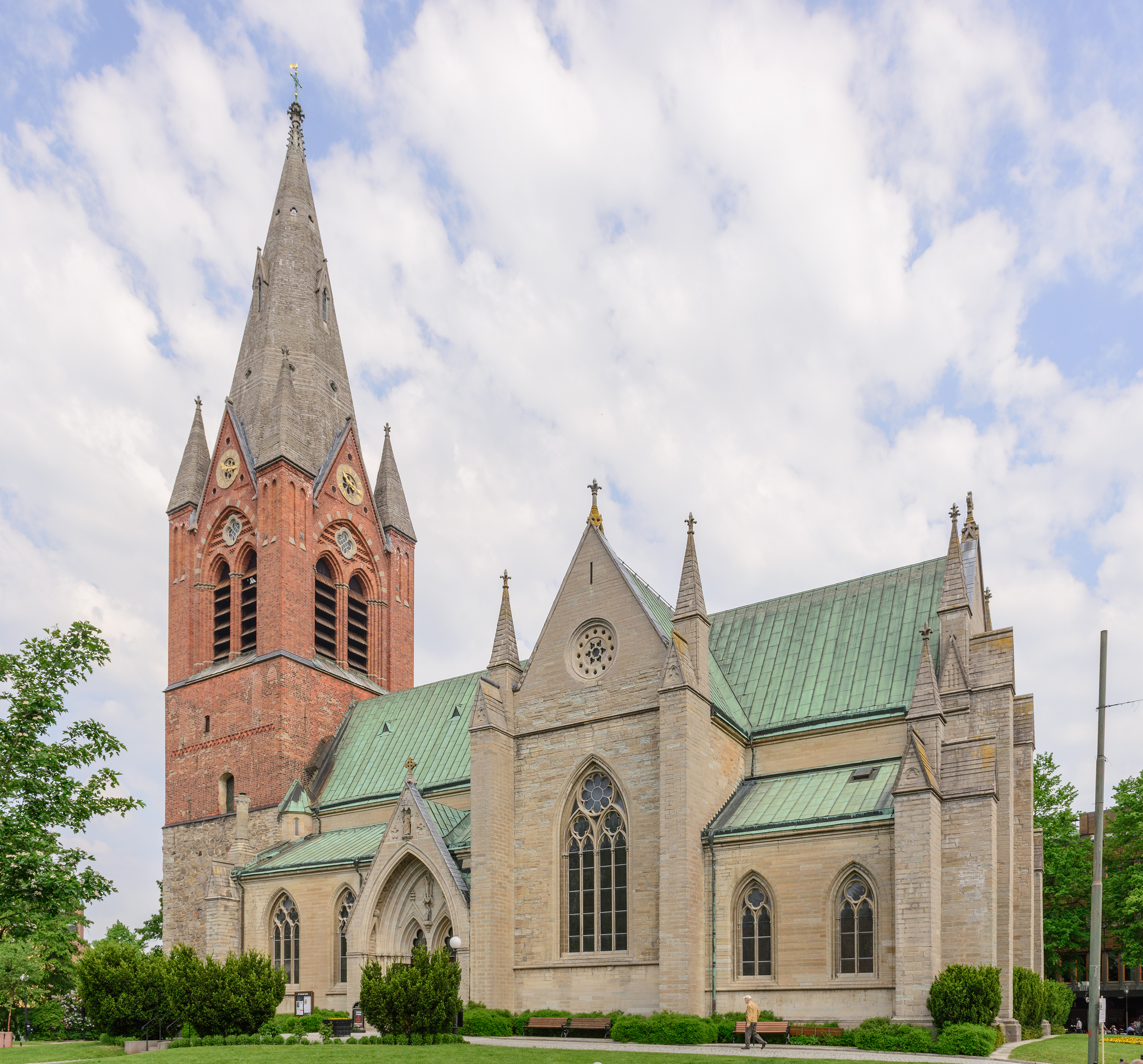
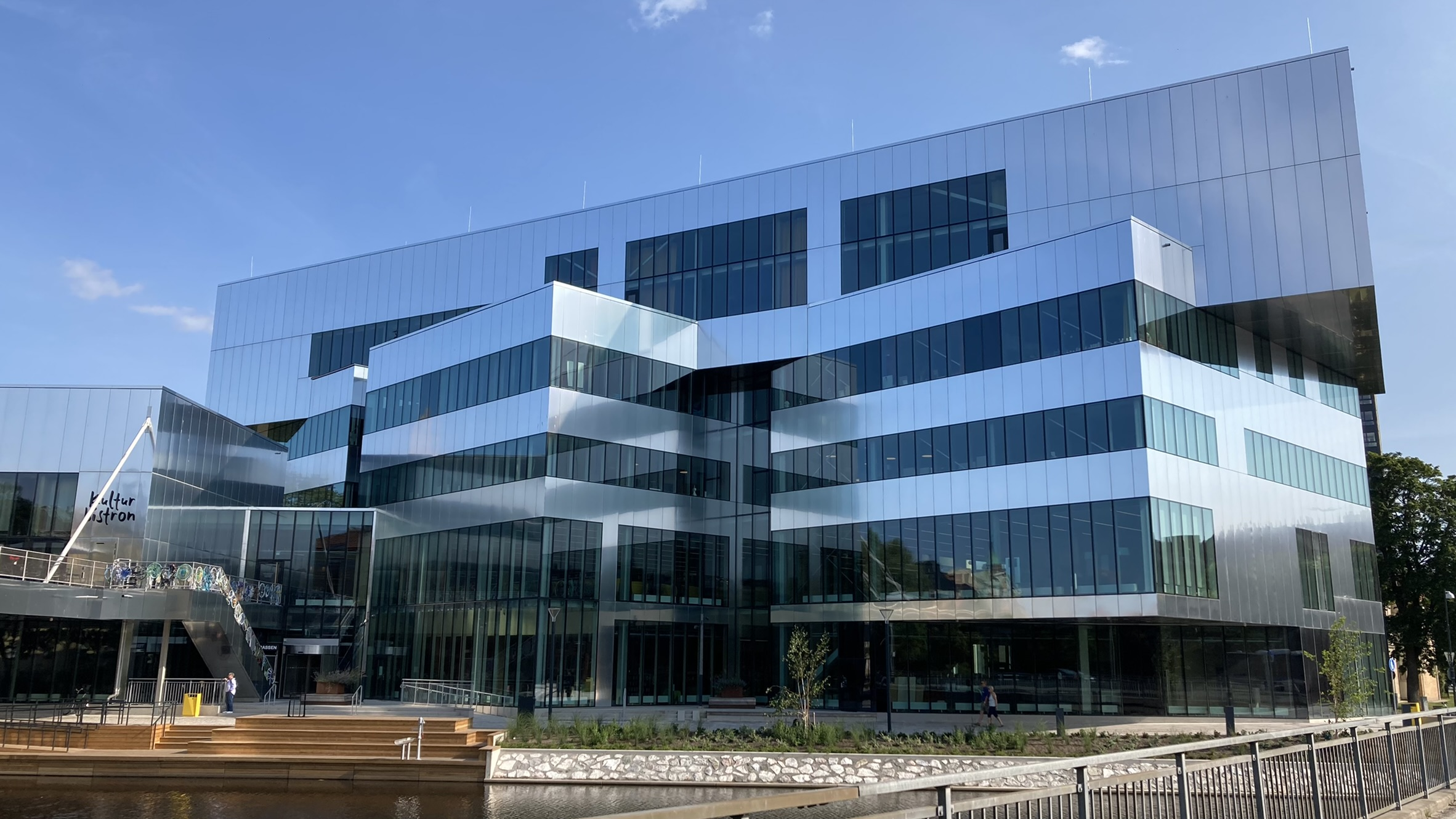
- Örebro Castle The Central Palace Örebro University Saint Nicholas Church The Cultural Quarter

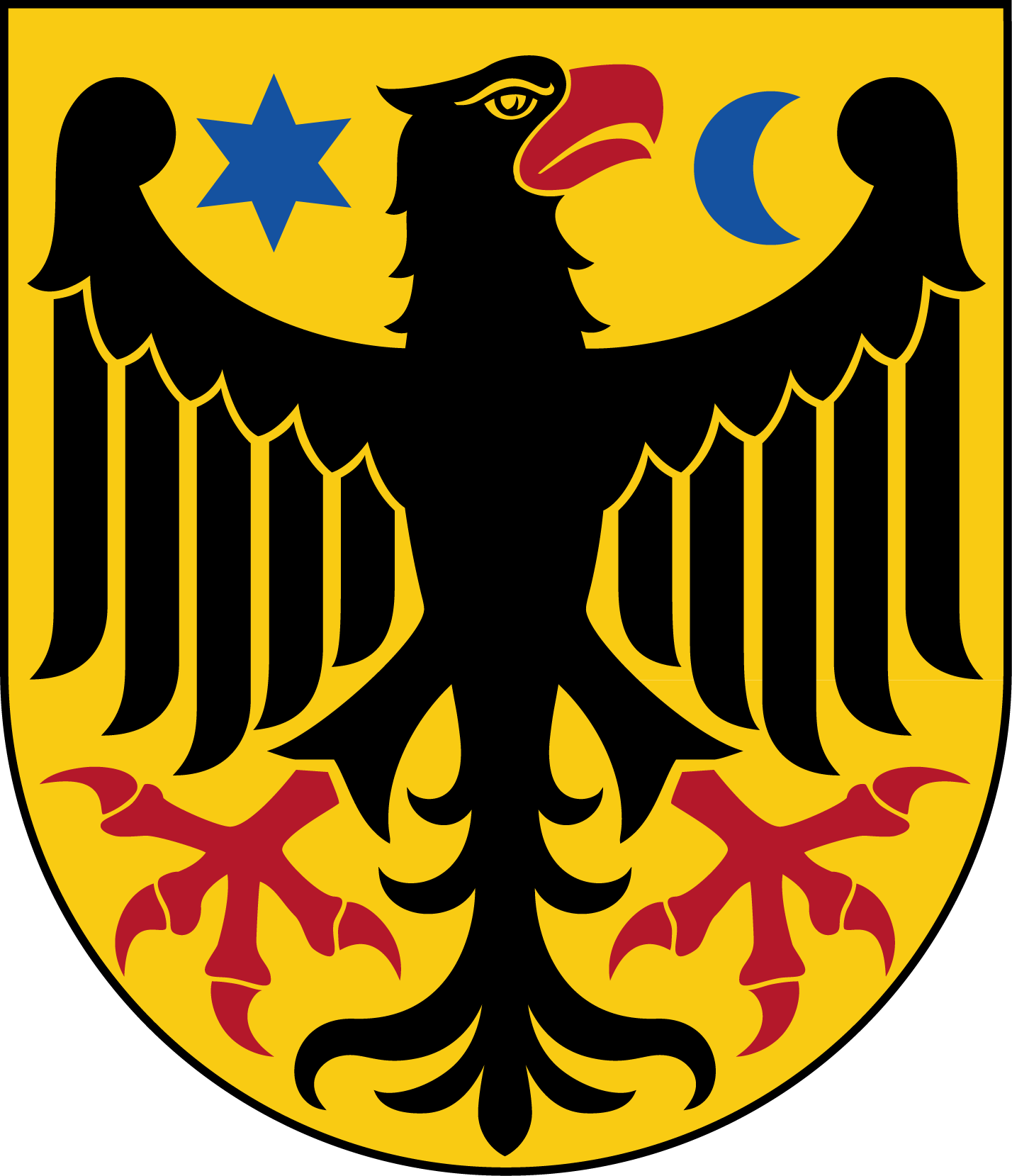
- Coat of arms

- Location within Örebro Location within Sweden
- Coordinates: 59°16′26″N 15°12′27″E
- Country: Sweden
- Province: Närke
- County: Örebro County
- Municipality: Örebro Municipality
- Charter: 1404

Area
  - City: 1,380.11 km^{2} (532.86 sq mi)
  - Urban: 49.27 km^{2} (19.02 sq mi)
- Elevation: 34 m (112 ft)

Population (2019)
  - City: 155,989
  - Density: 2,172/km^{2} (5,630/sq mi)
  - Urban: 125,817
  - Metro: 196,304^{[a]}
- Demonym: Örebroare
- Time zone: UTC+1 (CET)
  - Summer (DST): UTC+2 (CEST)
- Postal code: 701 xx, 702 xx, 703 xx
- Area code: (+46) 19
- Website: orebro.se
- Including Örebro, Kumla, Hallsberg and Lekeberg municipalities.

Örebro (/ˌɜːrəˈbruː/ UR-ə-BROO; Swedish: [œrɛˈbruː]) is the seventh-largest city in Sweden, the seat of Örebro Municipality, and capital of Örebro County. It is situated by the Närke Plain, near the lake Hjälmaren, a few kilometers inland along the small river Svartån, and has a population of approximately 126,000 in the city proper. It is one of the largest inland hubs of the country, and a major logistic and commercial operating site.

Örebro is home to Örebro University, a major university hospital, a medieval castle, the water park Gustavsvik as well as several large shopping malls and the Oset and Rynningeviken Nature Reserve adjacent to lake Hjälmaren.

Örebro is a trade and logistics city with a strategic location 200 km from Stockholm, 330 km from Oslo and 280 km from Gothenburg. The city is served by Örebro Airport 10 km (6 mi) southwest of the city, and by Örebro Central Station, serviced by the Mälaren Line and Western Main Line.

== Etymology ==
The name Örebro refers to a bridge (bro) crossing the river Svartån where the city is located. The prefix Öre- is derived from ör 'gravel (bank)'.

== History ==
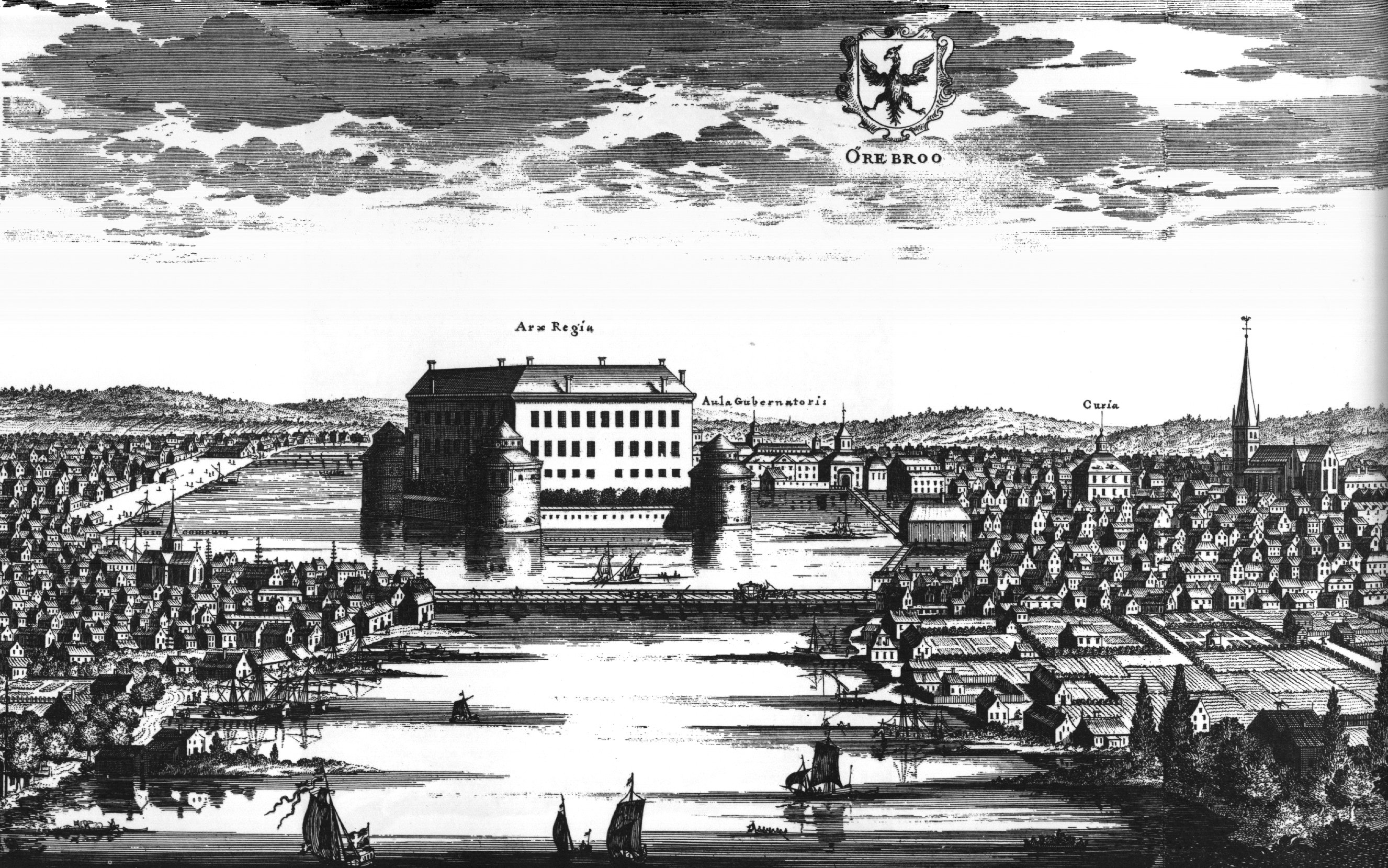
Örebro c. 1700, in Suecia antiqua et hodierna, with the castle in the middle

Örebro received its Royal Charter and city privileges not later than 1404.

The location became a natural seat of commerce in the Scandinavian Middle Ages and is mentioned in print in the 13th century. Old buildings from the early days include the foundations of the city church, a building which has undergone several modifications. The natural center of the city is otherwise Örebro Castle, situated on an islet in the Svartån, and dividing the town into a northern and a southern part. This castle was constructed during the stewardship of Birger Jarl during the late 13th century and then modified and enlarged during the reign of King Gustav Vasa in the 1560s. The Örebro Synod was held here in 1529.

Notable events in Örebro's history include the national diet meeting at Örebro in 1810, where Jean-Baptiste Bernadotte was elected crown prince of Sweden.

Although a trade town, Örebro remained small until the second half of the 19th century, when it grew rapidly as a center of the national shoe-manufacturing industry.

=== 2025 Risbergska school shooting ===
On 4 February 2025, a school shooting occurred at Campus Risbergska, an adult education centre in Örebro. Eleven people were killed, including the perpetrator, and six others injured. 35-year-old Rickard Andersson was identified as the shooter, but his motives for the attack are still under investigation by the Swedish Police Authority and the Swedish Security Service. Six people were hospitalised, with authorities warning there may be more casualties. According to Swedish prime minister Ulf Kristersson, it is the deadliest mass shooting in the country's history.

== Demographics ==
=== Population development Örebro County ===
Population development in Örebro County 1970–2020
Year	Population
1970	275,490
1975	273,923
1980	274,356
1985	270,211
1990	272,513
1995	276,417
2000	273,615
2005	274,121
2010	280,230
2015	291,012
2020	305,643

=== Population development Örebro Municipality ===
Population development in Örebro Municipality 1970–2020
Year	Population
1970	117,696
1975	117,837
1980	116,969
1985	118,043
1990	120,944
1995	119,635
2000	124,207
2005	127,733
2010	135,460
2015	144,200
2020	156,381
Source: SCB - Folkmängd efter region och år.

== Sites of interest ==
Örebro's old town, Wadköping, is located on the banks of the Svartån. It contains many 18th and 19th century wooden houses, along with museums and exhibitions.

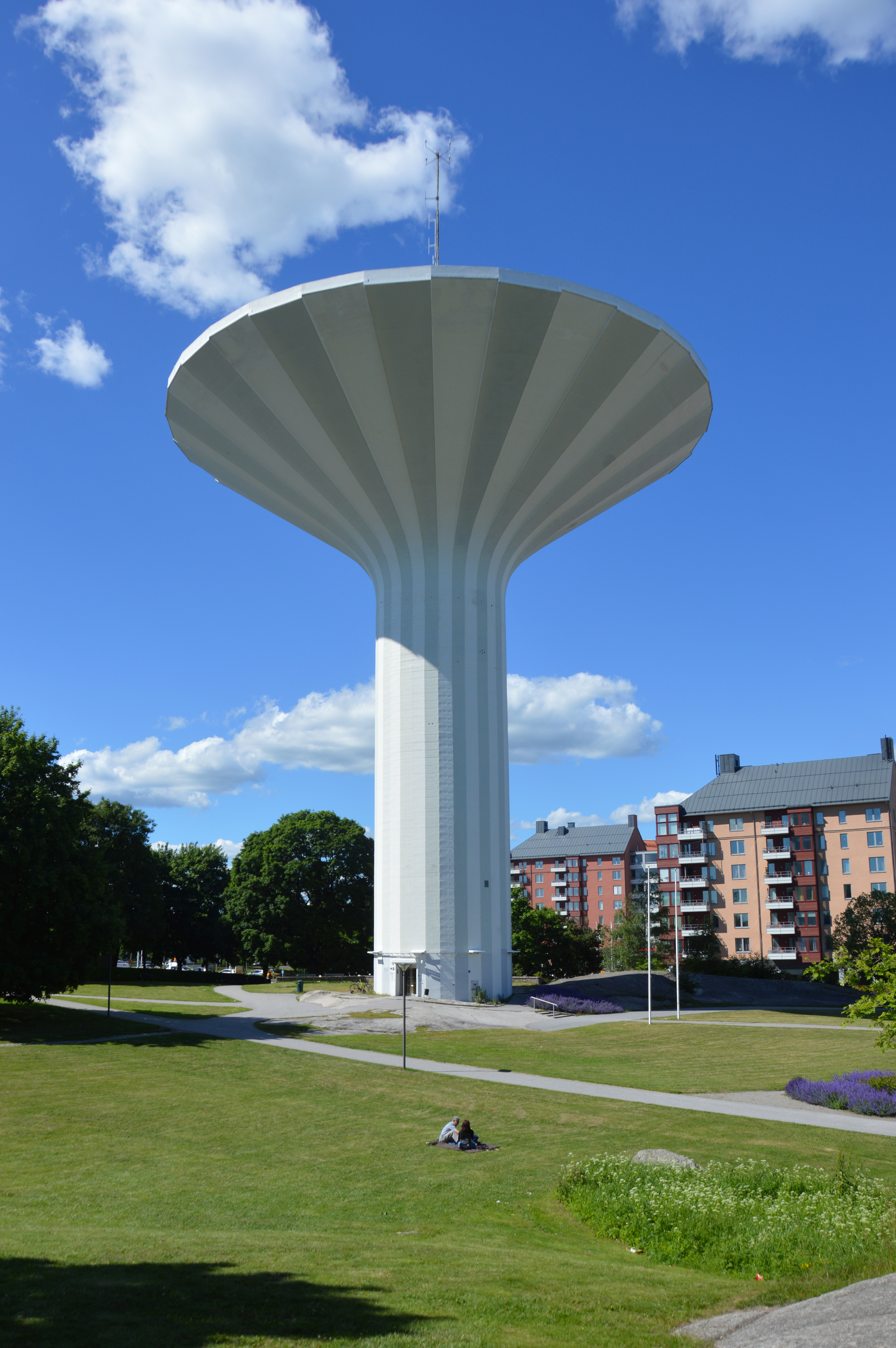
The watertower Svampen (The Mushroom). A restaurant is located at the top of the building.

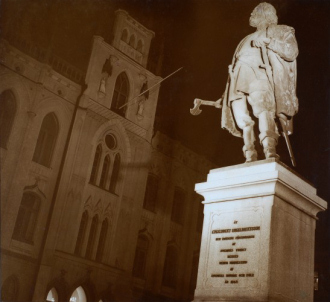
Rebel leader Engelbrekt in front of Örebro City Hall

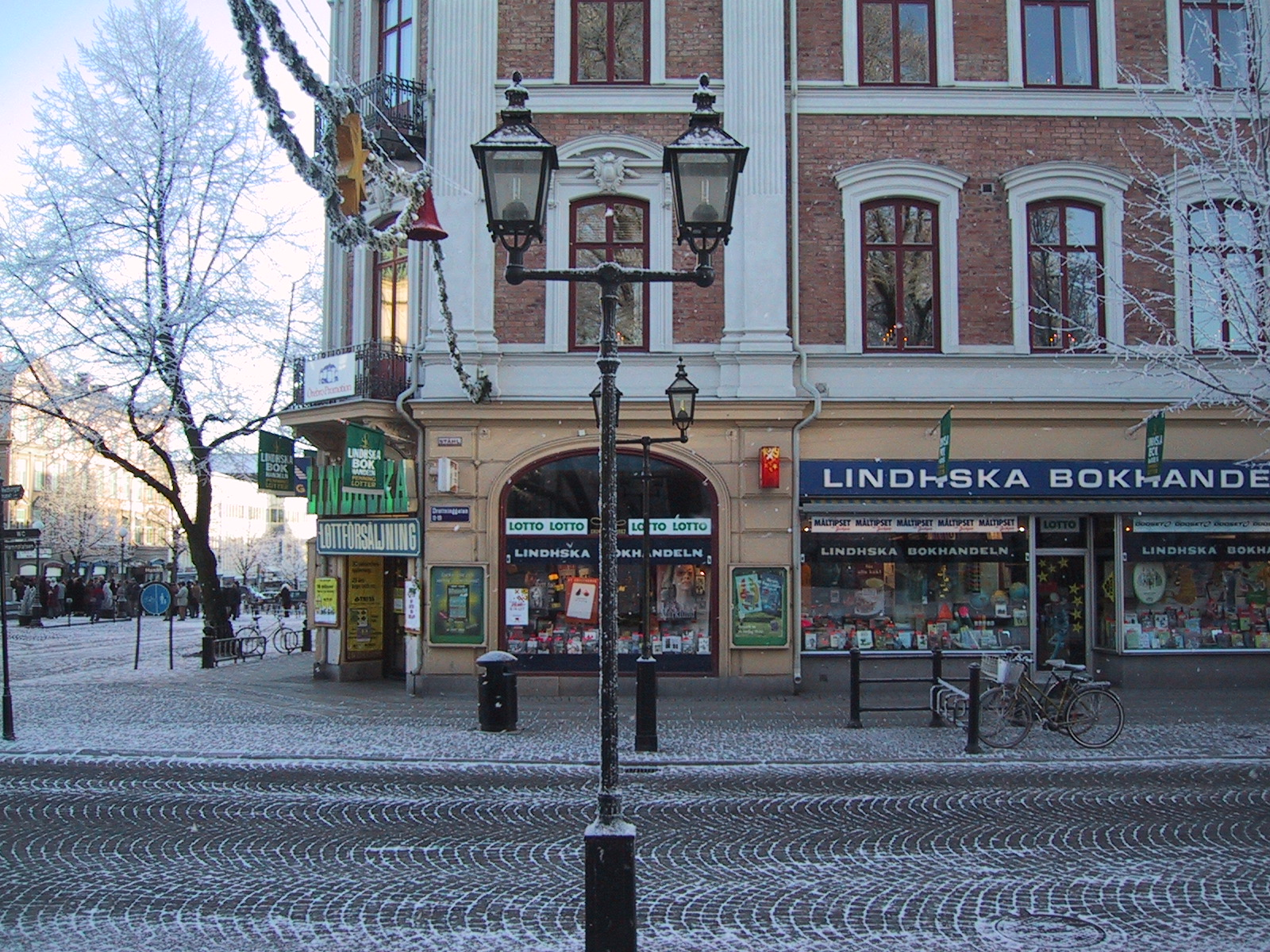
Lindhska Bookstore in central Örebro

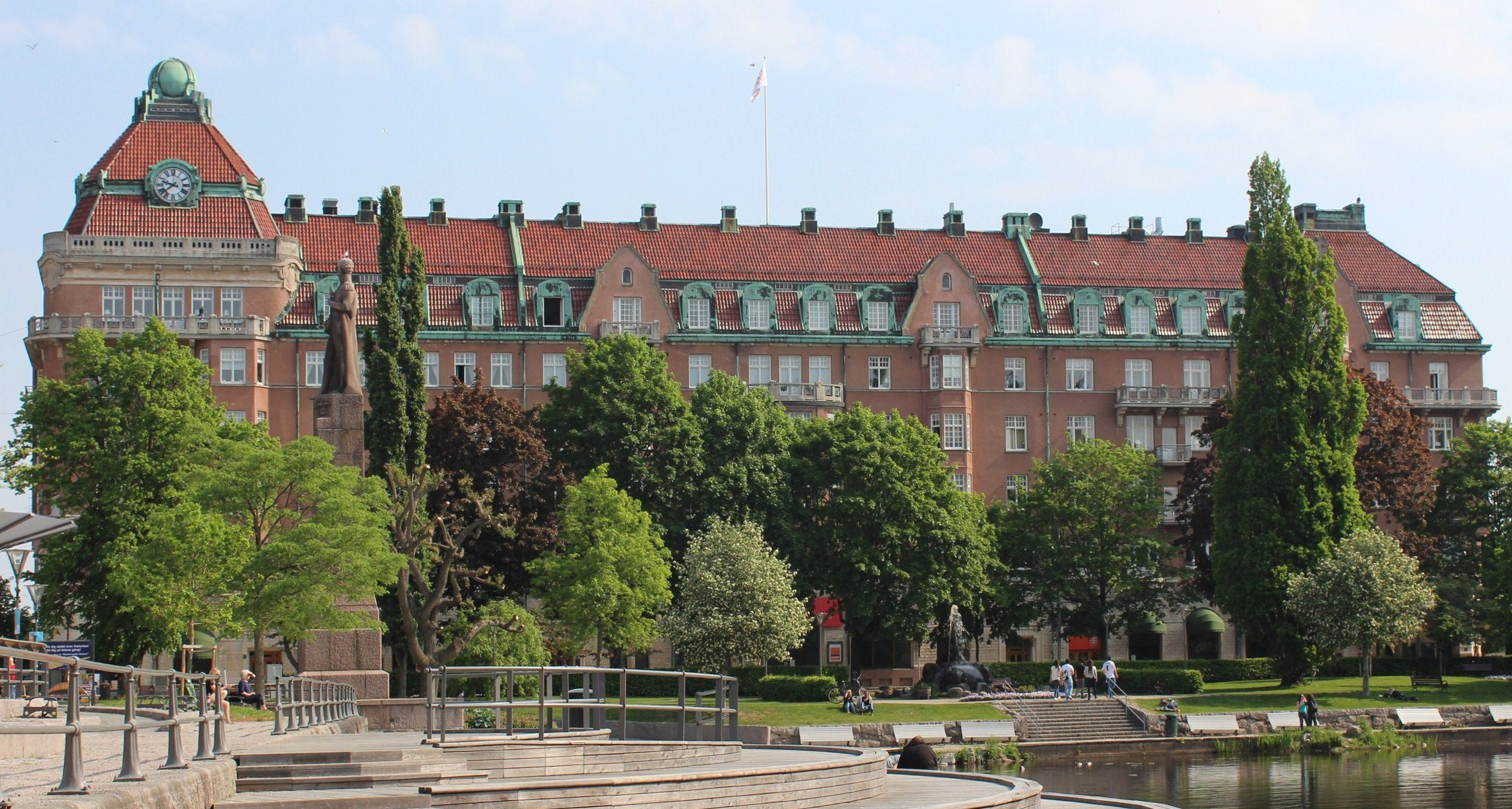
Centralpalatset, at the corner of Storgatan, one of Örebro's main streets

== Education ==
Örebro University is one of Sweden's most recent, being upgraded from högskola (university college) in 1999. It currently has around 16,000 students and a staff of 1,100. In 2025 The institution was ranked in the top 501–600 universities in the world in the Times Higher Education World University Rankings. The university is also named among the world's top 100 young universities (number 62) in the 2018 THE Young University Rankings.

== Culture ==
- Swedish Chamber Orchestra
- Örebro is the hometown of the punk-rock band Millencolin. They named one of their albums Pennybridge Pioneers, where Pennybridge stands for Örebro as a colloquial translation into English.
- Örebro is the hometown of various Swedish rock bands, such as Smash Into Pieces, Truckfighters, Blues Pills, Witchcraft, Troubled Horse and others. Graveyard's lead singer Joakim Nilsson was also born in Örebro.
- The influential and highly popular grind band Nasum were formed in Örebro.
- Örebro is one of the public broadcaster SVT's 12 local news districts and has television premises located in the city.

Örebro has hosted a contemporary art exhibition called Open Art on four occasions: in 2008, 2009, 2011 and 2013. In 2013, the exhibition featured works by 90 artists from Sweden and many other countries throughout the world. The fifth edition of the exhibition is planned for the summer of 2015.

Gustavsvik, the largest water park in the Nordic countries, is located just a kilometer south of central Örebro. With more than 700,000 visitors per year, it is one of the most popular tourist and leisure establishments in Sweden. Only Liseberg, Gröna Lund and Skansen are more popular. In the summer the manor of Karlslund is a very popular place to visit.

== Sports ==
=== Football ===
- Örebro SK, the biggest football club in Örebro with the men's team having played many seasons in Allsvenskan, currently (2026) playing in Superettan.
- KIF Örebro, the most successful women's football team, currently (2026) playing in Damallsvenskan.
- Karlslunds IF
- BK Forward
- Örebro Nordic
- Rynninge IK
- Örebro Syrianska IF
- FK Bosna 92
- Adolfsbergs IK
- IFK Örebro
- IK Sturehov

=== Floorball ===
- Lillån IBK
- IBF Örebro

=== Speedway ===
The city has a motorcycle speedway venue known as the Örebro Motorstadion, near Örebro Airport, that hosts the speedway team known as Vikingarna. The team participate in the Swedish Speedway Team Championship. They raced at two former venues; the old Örebro Motorstadion in Adolfsberg (1949 to circa.1965) and Trängens IP (circa.1967 to 1975). The Adolfsberg track staged a qualifying round of the Speedway World Championship in 1954.

=== Other sports ===
- Örebro Volley play in the highest level of women's volleyball leagues in Sweden. They have won the league ten times.
- Örebro HK currently play in Swedish Hockey League (the highest level) since the 2013–14 season, having been promoted in the 2012–13 season.
- Örebro Black Knights are an American football Club that played in the Swedish Championship Finals in 1998, 1999, 2013, 2014, 2015, 2016 and 2017.
- Örebro SK Bandy has become national bandy champion five times. The home matches are played in Behrn Arena, one of sixteen (as of 2018) indoor bandy arenas in Sweden.

Karlslunds IF is a multi-sports club specialising in American Football, Bandy, Baseball/Softball, Bowling, Football, Gymnastics, Skiing and Swimming.

== Climate ==
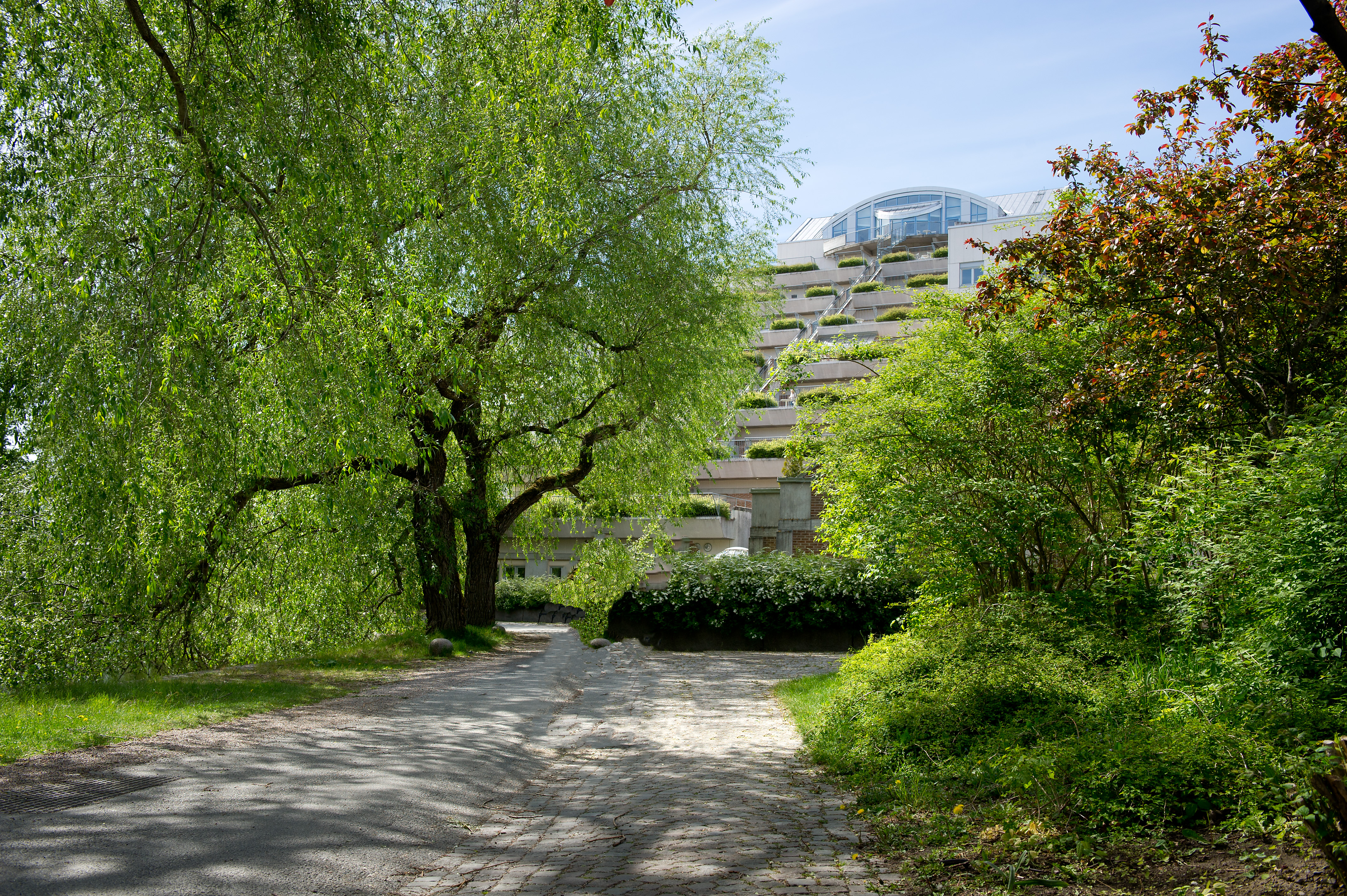
Recreation area at Örebro University Hospital

Örebro, like the rest of the area close to Mälardalen, has a humid continental climate (Köppen Dfb) that is made milder by the proximity to water and the Gulf Stream which makes it interchangeable with oceanic climates. Summer temperatures occasionally exceed 30 °C (86 °F) albeit not yearly, and temperatures above 5 °C (41 °F) are rare in winter, although frost-free nights sometimes occur. July average high temperatures generally range from 20 °C (68 °F) to 26 °C (79 °F) depending on weather patterns, with a 2002–2021 mean high of around 23.5 °C (74.3 °F). July lows averaged 12.3 °C (54.1 °F), sizeably cooler than seaside areas. January averaged 0.7 °C (33.3 °F) average highs in the same timeframe, with average lows of −5 °C (23 °F).

During cold winters, Örebro receives plenty of snowfall. Örebro is far more prone than coastal areas to really harsh frosts with temperatures approaching or below −20 °C (−4 °F) happening almost every winter according to SMHI statistics. The station's setting in a rural location might skew temperatures somewhat compared to the urban area which is also at a slightly lower elevation and nearer Hjälmaren. Especially when considering overnight lows this could result in a small urban heat island effect in downtown.

However, the climate is very variable from year to year. For example, December 2010 was record cold with a daily mean of −9 °C (16 °F), whilst December 2006 only a few years before had a mean of 4.3 °C (39.7 °F). The warmest month on record is 21.8 °C (71.2 °F) in July 2018 and the coldest on record is −12.8 °C (9.0 °F) in January 1987. Örebro is often without snow cover for large parts of the winter months when daytime temperatures hover just above freezing – an exceptional feature for an inland area north of the 59th latitude. The westerly Atlantic moderating influence is strong enough that far inland Örebro has milder winters than the near-coastal town Norrtälje, located slightly farther north on the Baltic Sea with a similar rural weather station.

The highest ever recorded temperature was set on 7 August 1975 during an intense heatwave with 36 °C (97 °F), which is a very high temperature for such northerly latitudes. During the 21st century, the record heat is the all-time July record of 35.9 °C (96.6 °F) set in 2022. The lowest recorded temperature in recorded history was set in February 1966 with −30 °C (−22 °F). Several monthly records were set after 2010 according to official SMHI statistics, namely the record highs of February, March, May, July, October, November and December as well as the coldest December temperature and month on record, that was set in 2010. Humidity is high for most parts of the year, but adequately lower during summer months. In spite of this summer is generally the time that gets the most precipitation due to clashes between hot and cool continental air systems causing heavy thunderstorm rainfall. In 2015, a 13.1 °C (55.6 °F) reading was recorded around the winter solstice which was a very warm reading for an inland area in the low-sun season.

Being unshielded by the South Swedish highlands rain shadow, moist westerly air results in higher precipitation than on Baltic Sea locations. Summer convection and the flat topography of downtown can result in flash floods of low areas. Resulting from that, Örebro has been deemed one of the most vulnerable areas in Sweden to flooding and saw several incidents in a record wet summer in 2023.

Climate data for Örebro Airport (2002–2021 averages; precipitation in the ward of Almby; extremes since 1901)
Month	Jan	Feb	Mar	Apr	May	Jun	Jul	Aug	Sep	Oct	Nov	Dec	Year
Record high °C (°F)	10.2 (50.4)	15.4 (59.7)	18.8 (65.8)	26.9 (80.4)	29.0 (84.2)	34.0 (93.2)	35.9 (96.6)	36.0 (96.8)	28.1 (82.6)	20.2 (68.4)	18.1 (64.6)	13.1 (55.6)	36.0 (96.8)
Mean maximum °C (°F)	7.1 (44.8)	7.8 (46.0)	13.2 (55.8)	19.7 (67.5)	25.3 (77.5)	27.7 (81.9)	29.4 (84.9)	28.3 (82.9)	22.7 (72.9)	16.6 (61.9)	11.9 (53.4)	8.3 (46.9)	30.6 (87.1)
Mean daily maximum °C (°F)	0.7 (33.3)	1.4 (34.5)	5.8 (42.4)	12.2 (54.0)	17.4 (63.3)	21.4 (70.5)	23.5 (74.3)	22.0 (71.6)	17.4 (63.3)	10.7 (51.3)	5.6 (42.1)	2.5 (36.5)	11.7 (53.1)
Daily mean °C (°F)	−2.2 (28.0)	−1.8 (28.8)	1.6 (34.9)	6.6 (43.9)	11.6 (52.9)	15.7 (60.3)	17.9 (64.2)	16.6 (61.9)	12.6 (54.7)	7.0 (44.6)	2.9 (37.2)	−0.2 (31.6)	7.4 (45.3)
Mean daily minimum °C (°F)	−5.0 (23.0)	−4.9 (23.2)	−2.7 (27.1)	1.0 (33.8)	5.7 (42.3)	9.9 (49.8)	12.3 (54.1)	11.2 (52.2)	7.7 (45.9)	3.3 (37.9)	0.2 (32.4)	−2.9 (26.8)	3.0 (37.4)
Mean minimum °C (°F)	−17.9 (−0.2)	−15.6 (3.9)	−11.6 (11.1)	−5.8 (21.6)	−1.4 (29.5)	4.0 (39.2)	6.9 (44.4)	4.9 (40.8)	−0.2 (31.6)	−4.6 (23.7)	−9.2 (15.4)	−13.7 (7.3)	−20.4 (−4.7)
Record low °C (°F)	−29.6 (−21.3)	−30.0 (−22.0)	−28.0 (−18.4)	−14.5 (5.9)	−5.6 (21.9)	−1.2 (29.8)	2.5 (36.5)	0.0 (32.0)	−5.7 (21.7)	−12.8 (9.0)	−19.5 (−3.1)	−26.6 (−15.9)	−30 (−22)
Average precipitation mm (inches)	50.8 (2.00)	36.8 (1.45)	33.6 (1.32)	33.0 (1.30)	66.0 (2.60)	60.2 (2.37)	79.5 (3.13)	82.1 (3.23)	56.1 (2.21)	67.7 (2.67)	59.2 (2.33)	52.9 (2.08)	677.9 (26.69)
Average extreme snow depth cm (inches)	20 (7.9)	24 (9.4)	16 (6.3)	2 (0.8)	0 (0)	0 (0)	0 (0)	0 (0)	0 (0)	0 (0)	5 (2.0)	14 (5.5)	28 (11)
Average precipitation days (≥ 1 mm)	11.1	8.6	7.7	7.0	10.2	10.4	11.6	11.7	9.1	10.7	12.7	11.8	122.6
Source 1: SMHI Open Data
Source 2: SMHI average data 2002–2021

== Notable people ==
=== Artists ===
- Stephan Berg (born 1957), composer and songwriter, winner of Eurovision Song Contest 1991
- Jens Bogren (born 1979), record producer
- Ola Brunkert (1946–2008), drummer in ABBA
- Josef Fares (born 1977), Lebanese-Swedish film director
- Jasmine Kara (born 1988), singer
- Rob Marcello (born 1977), guitar player
- Nina Persson (born 1974), singer
- Mats Ronander (born 1954), singer, guitar player, and composer
- Mary Stävin (born 1957), James Bond girl, crowned as Miss World 1977
- Dan Swanö (born 1973), singer and multi-instrumentalist

==== Bands ====
- Blues Pills (2011–present), rock band
- Dead Man (2003–present), psychedelic folk rock band
- Lolita Pop (1979–1992, 2019-present), rock band
- Millencolin (1992–present), punk rock band
- Nasum (1992–2005), grindcore band
- Smash Into Pieces (2008–present), alternative rock band
- Spetsnaz (2001–present), electronic band
- Truckfighters (2001–present), rock band
- Witchcraft (2000–present), doom metal band

=== Politicians and public officials ===
- Henry Allard (1911–1996), politician, Speaker of the Swedish Riksdag
- Leni Björklund (born 1944), politician
- Engelbrekt Engelbrektsson, (1390s–1436), rebel leader and statesman
- Johan Pehrson (born 1968), politician, leader of the Liberal Party
- Göta Rosén (1904–2006), politician and child welfare inspector
- Sten Tolgfors (born 1966), politician and businessman
- Olof Daniel Westling (Prince Daniel; born 1973), husband of Crown Princess Victoria

=== Religion ===
- Gunnel André (born 1946), theologian, minister and author
- John Ongman (1844–1931), pastor
- Laurentius Petri (1499–1573), clergyman
- Olaus Petri (1493–1552), clergyman and reformer

=== Scientists and engineers ===
- Jens Bergensten (born 1979), game developer and lead designer of Minecraft
- Bertil Lindblad (1895–1965), astronomer
- Manne Siegbahn (1886–1978), physicist
- Gunnar A. Sjögren (1920–1996), automobile designer
- Jonas Wenström (1855–1893), engineer and inventor

=== Sportspeople ===
- Peter Andersson (born 1965), ice hockey player
- Christian Berglund (born 1980), ice hockey player
- Orvar Bergmark (1930–2004), football and bandy player
- Stig Blomqvist (born 1946), rally driver
- Hasse Borg (born 1953), football player
- Elisabeth Branäs (1930–2010), curler, two-time European champion
- Philip Broberg (born 2001), ice hockey player
- Magnus Erlingmark (born 1968), football player
- Emilia Fahlin (born 1988), cyclist
- Richard Göransson (born 1978), racing driver
- Carl Gunnarsson (born 1986), ice hockey player
- Borje Jansson (born 1942), Motorcycle rider, winner of four World Championship GPs, three in 125cc Class, one in 250cc Class.
- Oscar Jansson (born 1990), football player
- Melvin Kalousdian (born 2011), racing driver
- Fredrik Lindgren (born 1985), motorcycle speedway rider
- Ludvig Lindgren (born 1990), motorcycle speedway rider
- Tomas Nordahl (born 1946), football player and commentator
- Ronnie Peterson (1944–1978), racing driver
- Johan Röjler (born 1981), ice speed skater
- Edward Sandström (born 1979), racing driver
- Emra Tahirović (born 1987), Bosnian-Swedish football player
- Anders Wilander (born 1955), ice hockey player

=== Writers ===
- Hjalmar Bergman (1883–1931), writer and playwright
- August Gailit (1891–1960), Estonian writer
- Edita Morris (1902–1988), Swedish-American writer and political activist
- Emilie Risberg (1815–1890), novelist and educator
- Cajsa Warg (1703–1769), cookbook author

== Twin towns – sister cities ==
Örebro is twinned with:

- Drammen, Norway
- Kolding, Denmark
- Lappeenranta, Finland
- Łódź, Poland
- Stykkishólmur, Iceland
- Terrassa, Spain
- Veliky Novgorod, Russia
- Yantai, China

== Gallery ==
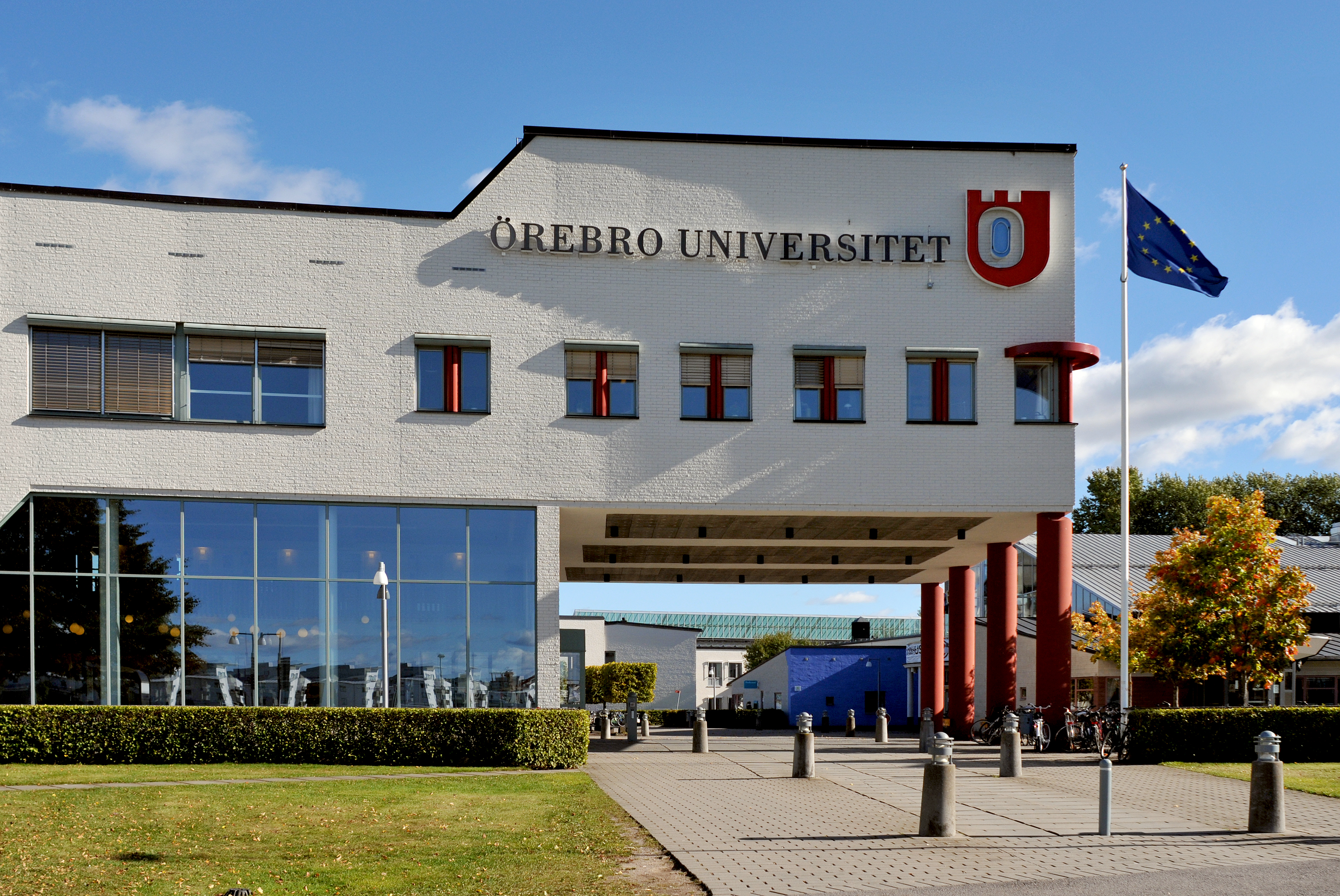
Örebro University

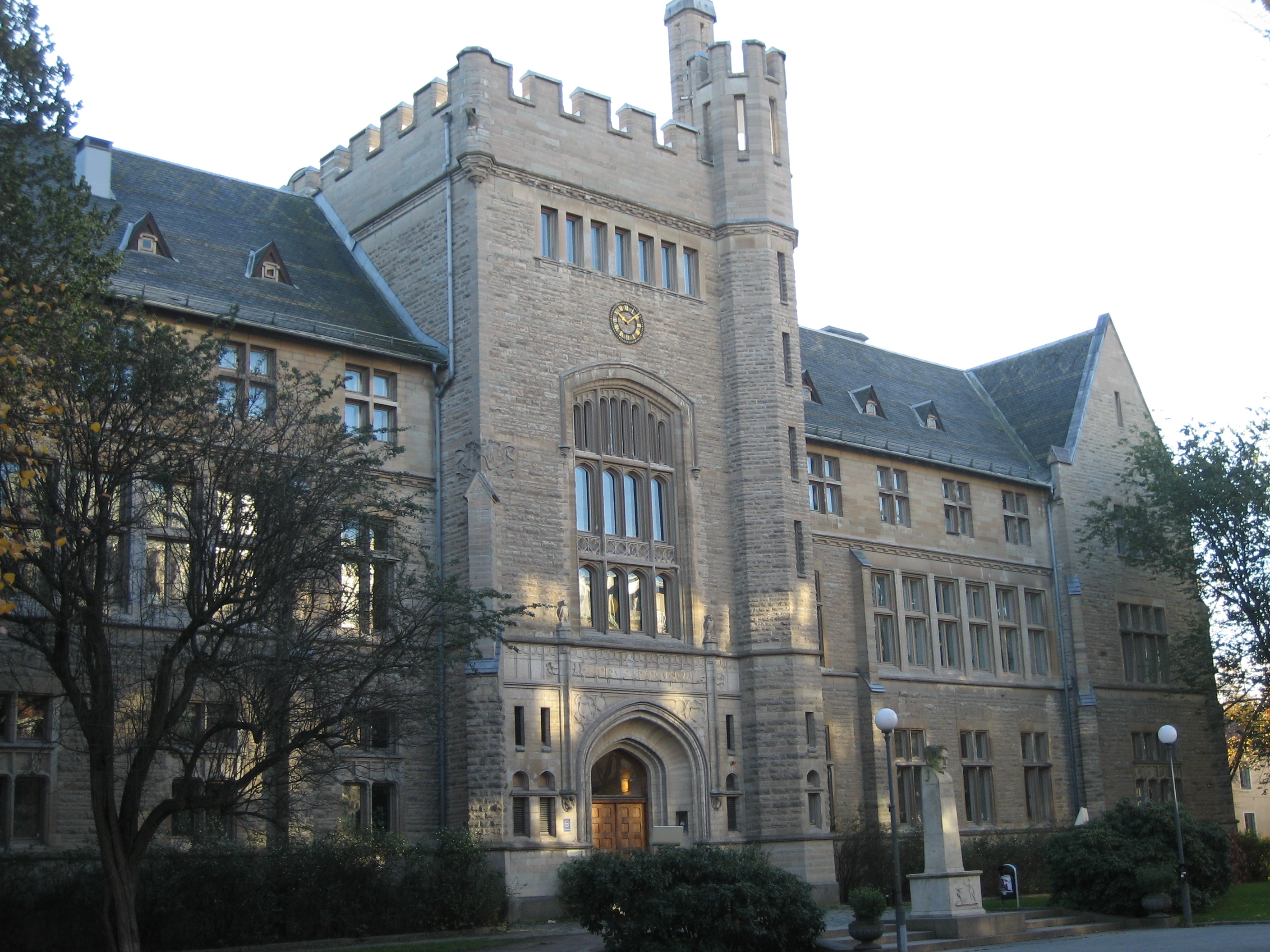
Rudbeck Upper Secondary School's Main Building

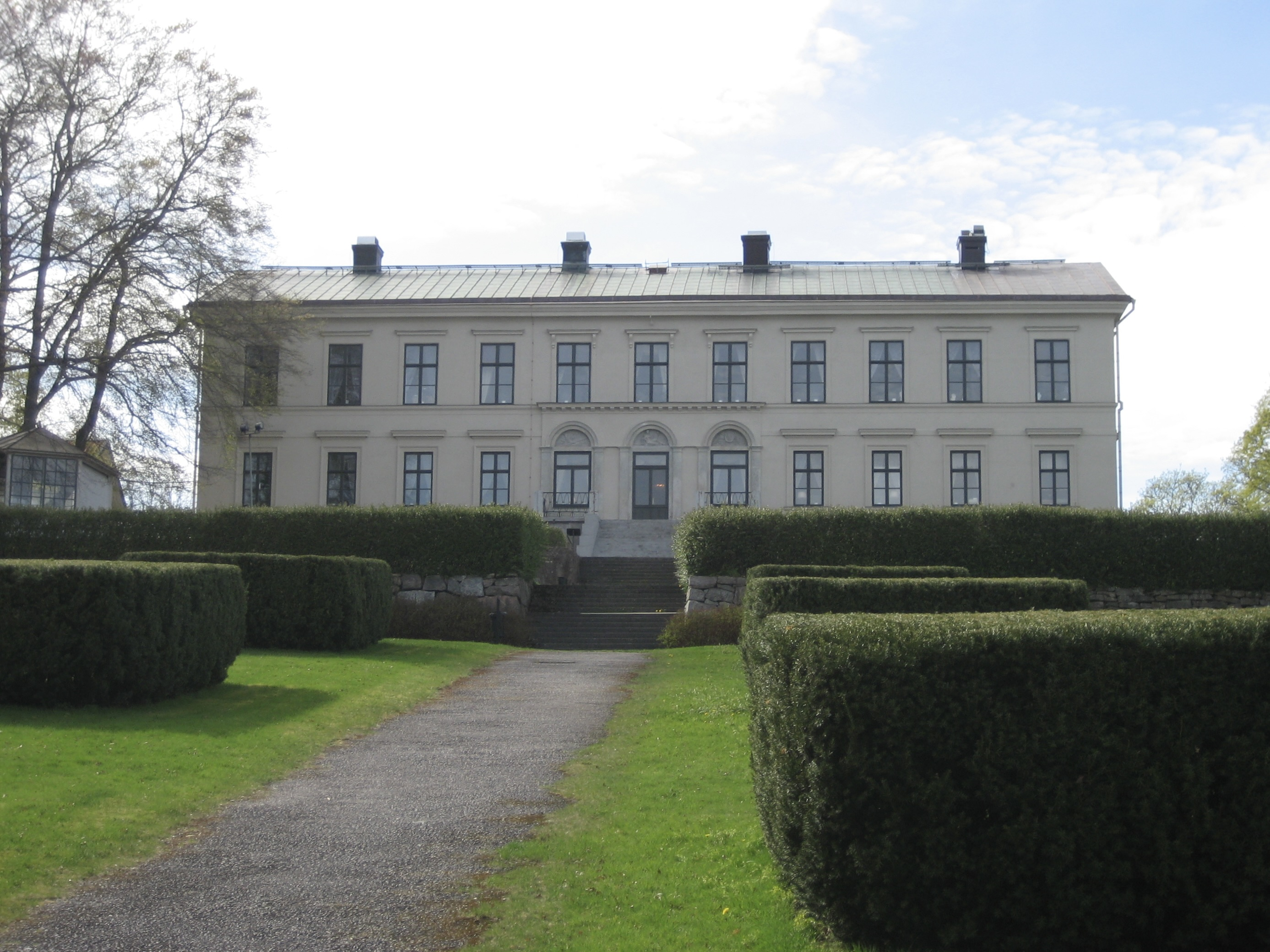
Karlslund Manor

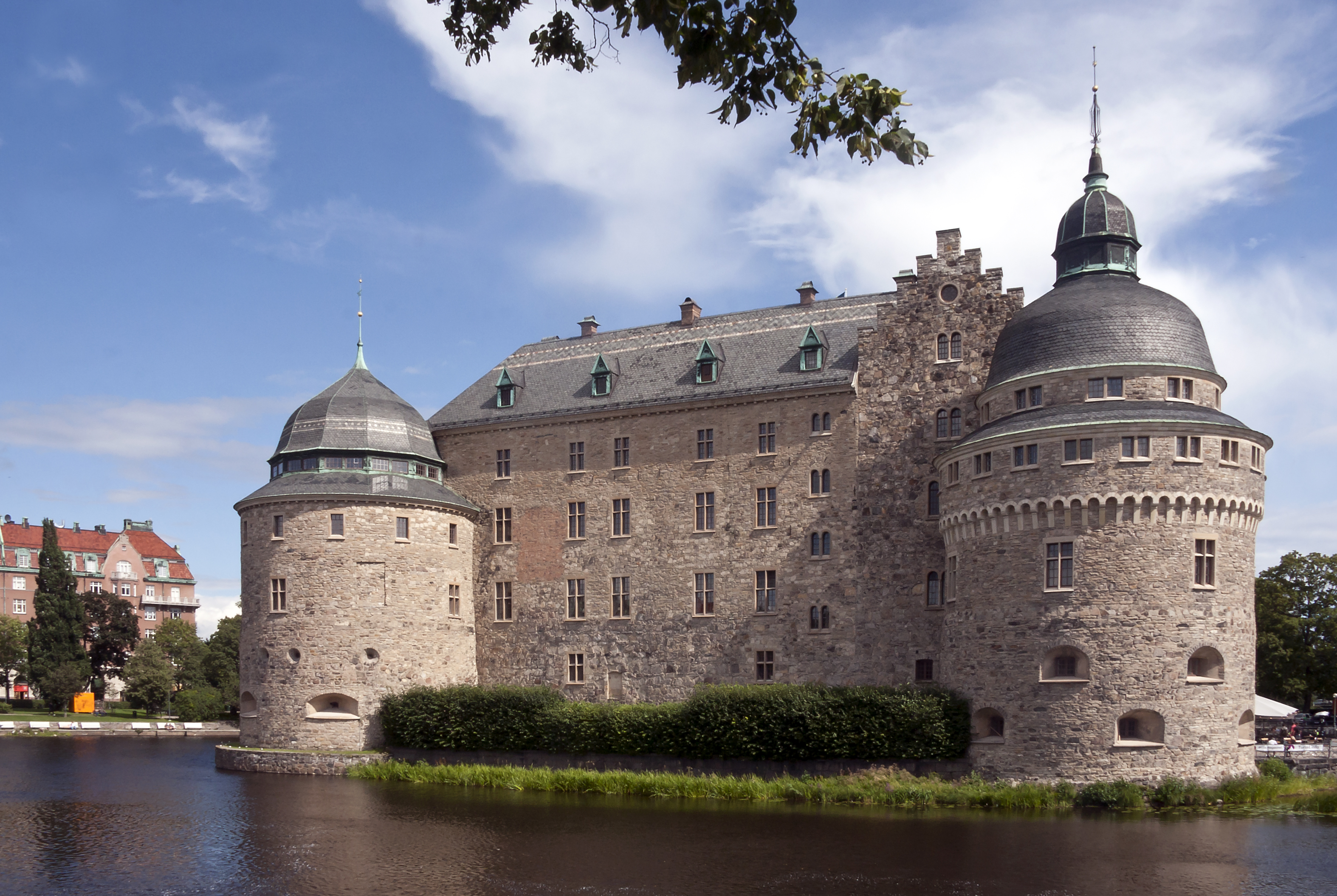
Örebro Castle

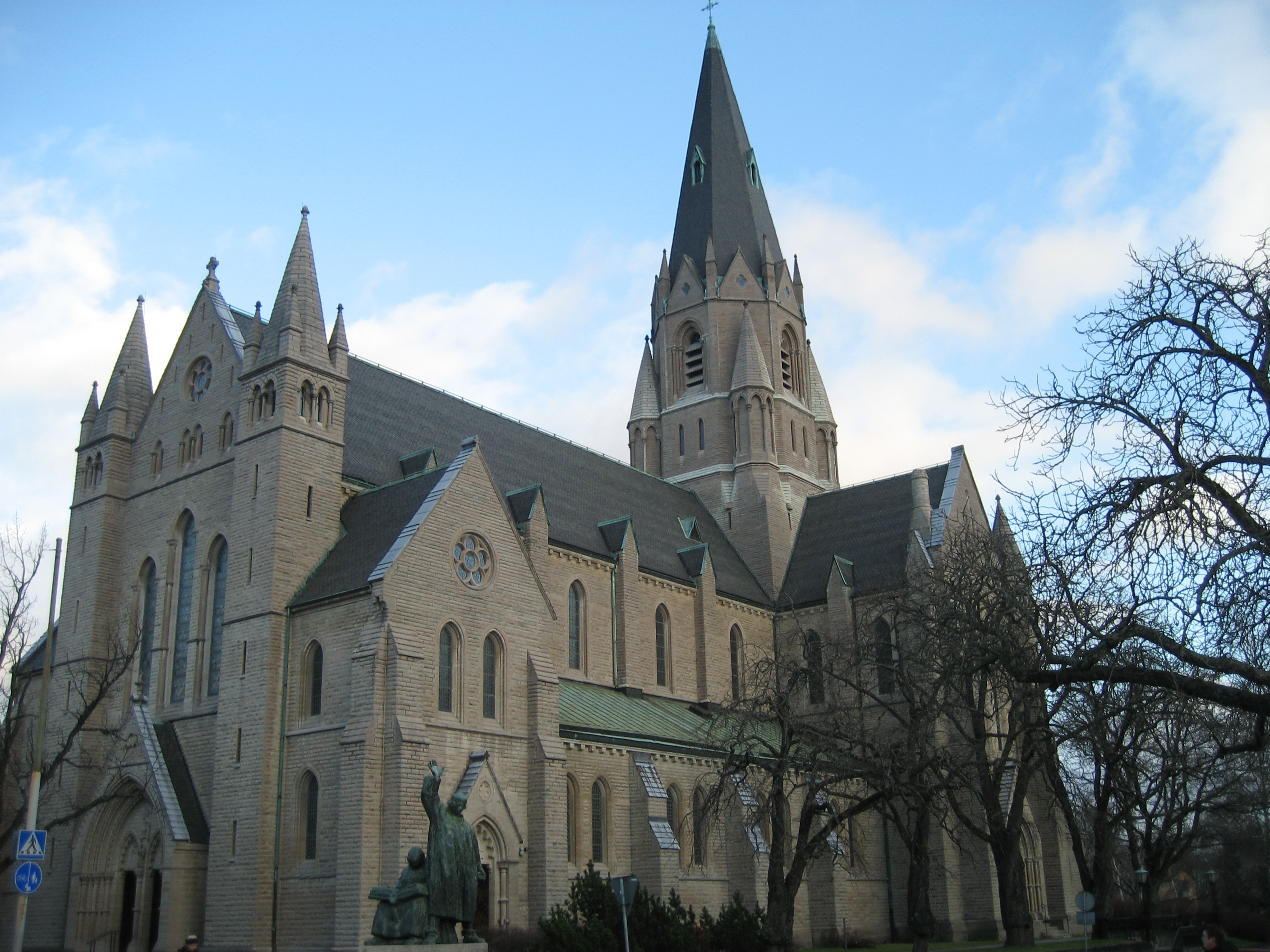
Olaus Petri Church

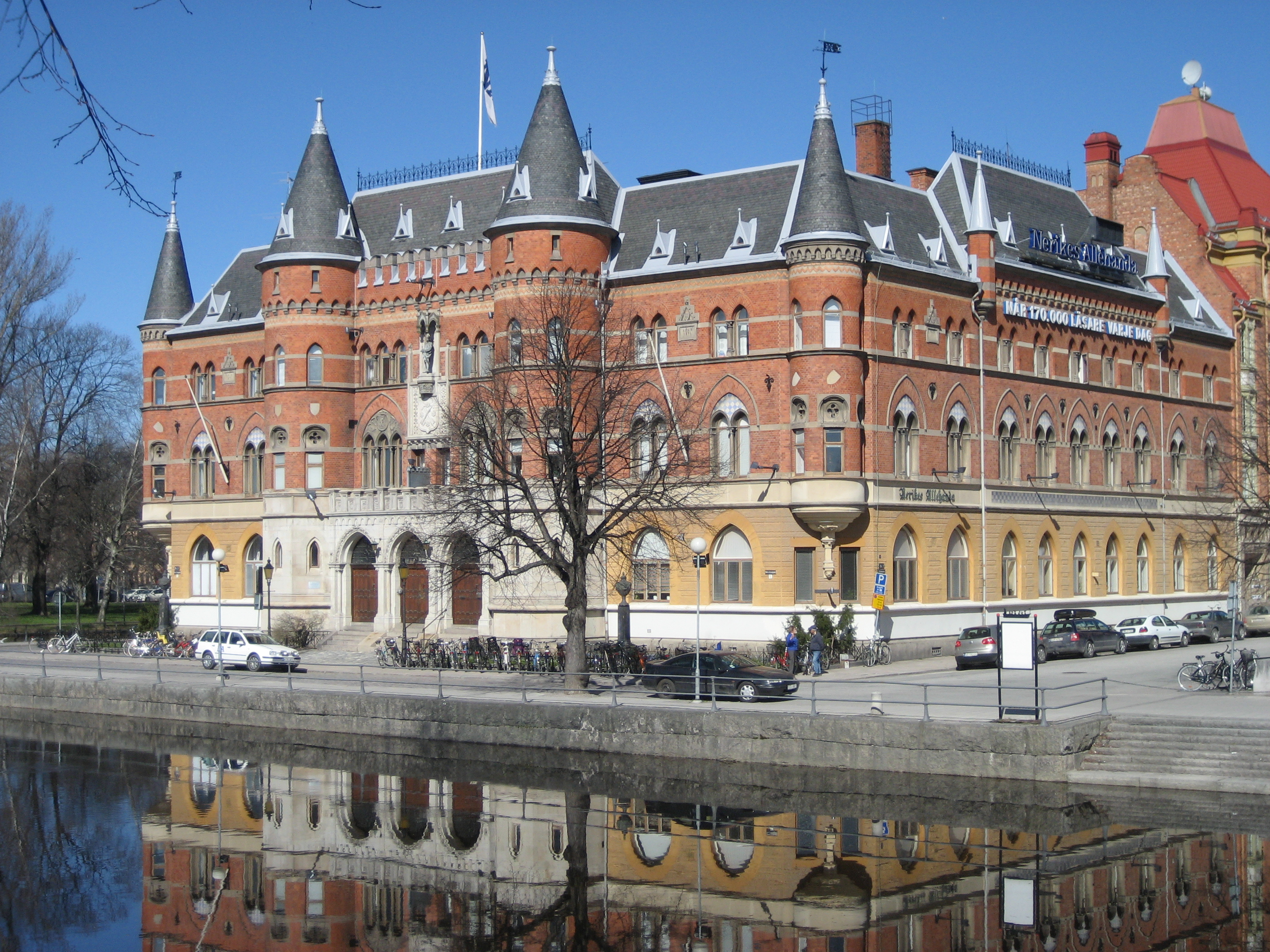
Nerikes Allehanda, the local newspaper's former offices in Örebro

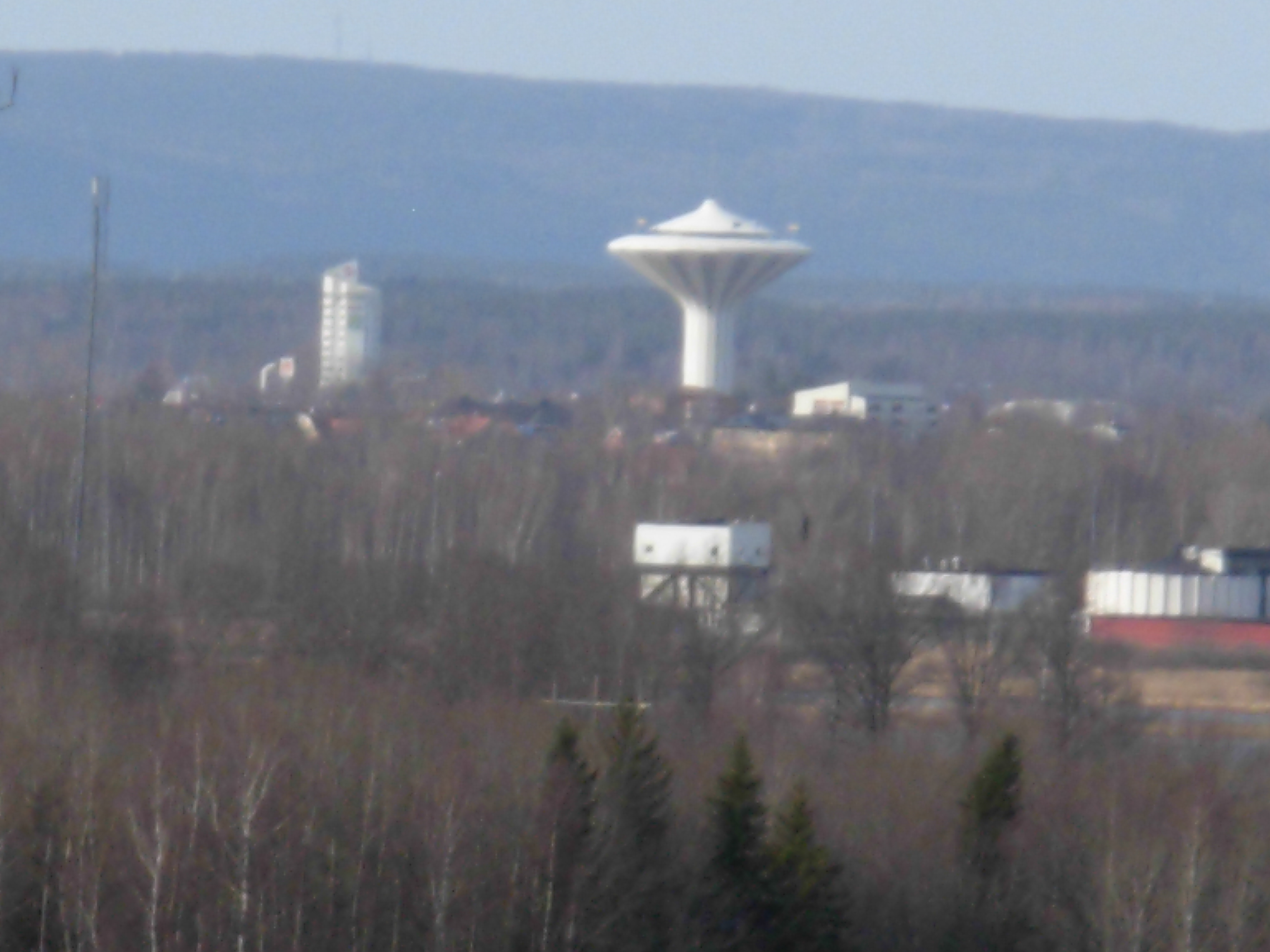
View over Örebro Watertower Svampen with the mountain ridge Kilsbergen in the background

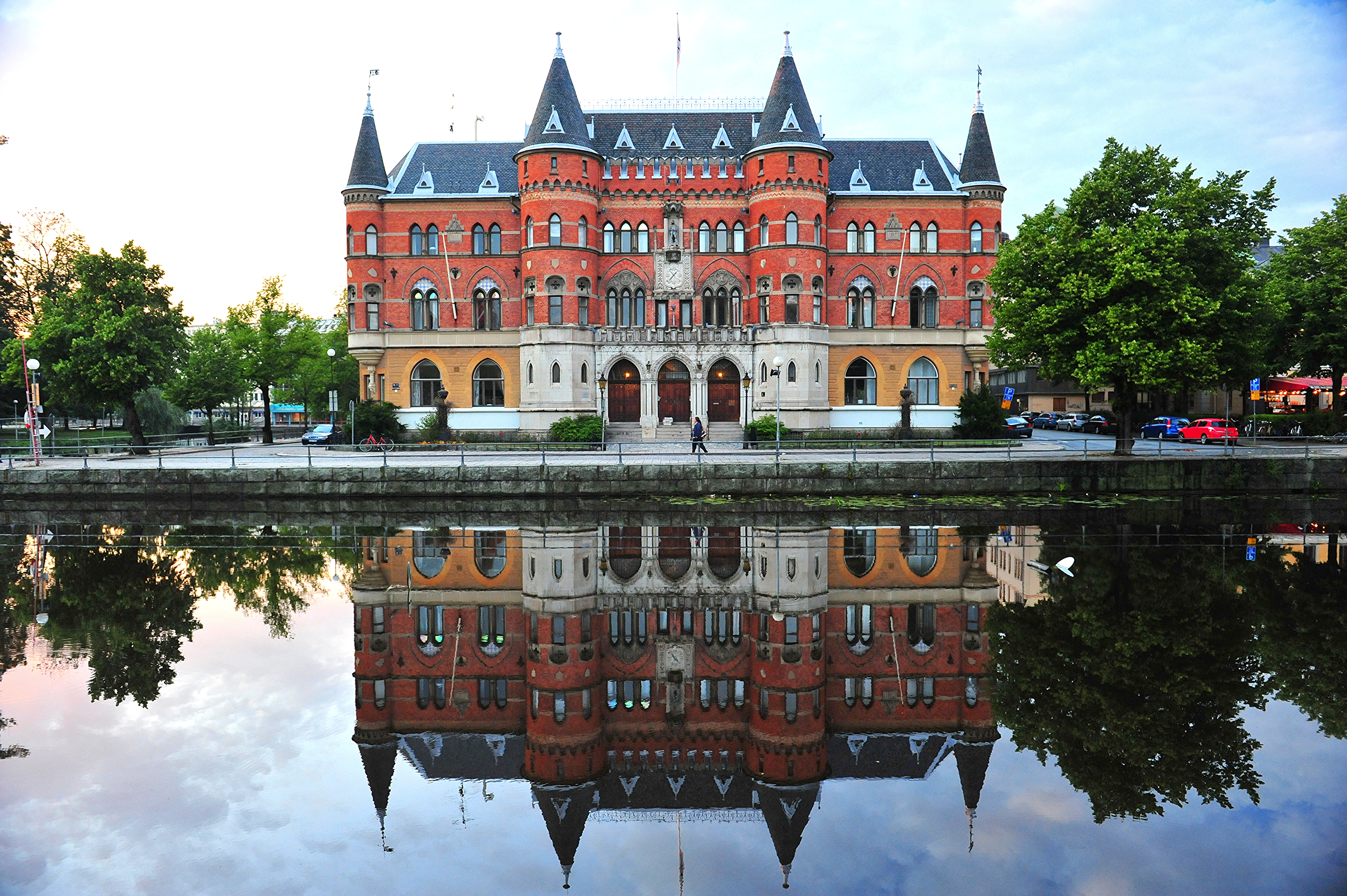
Allehandaborgen from Svartån river

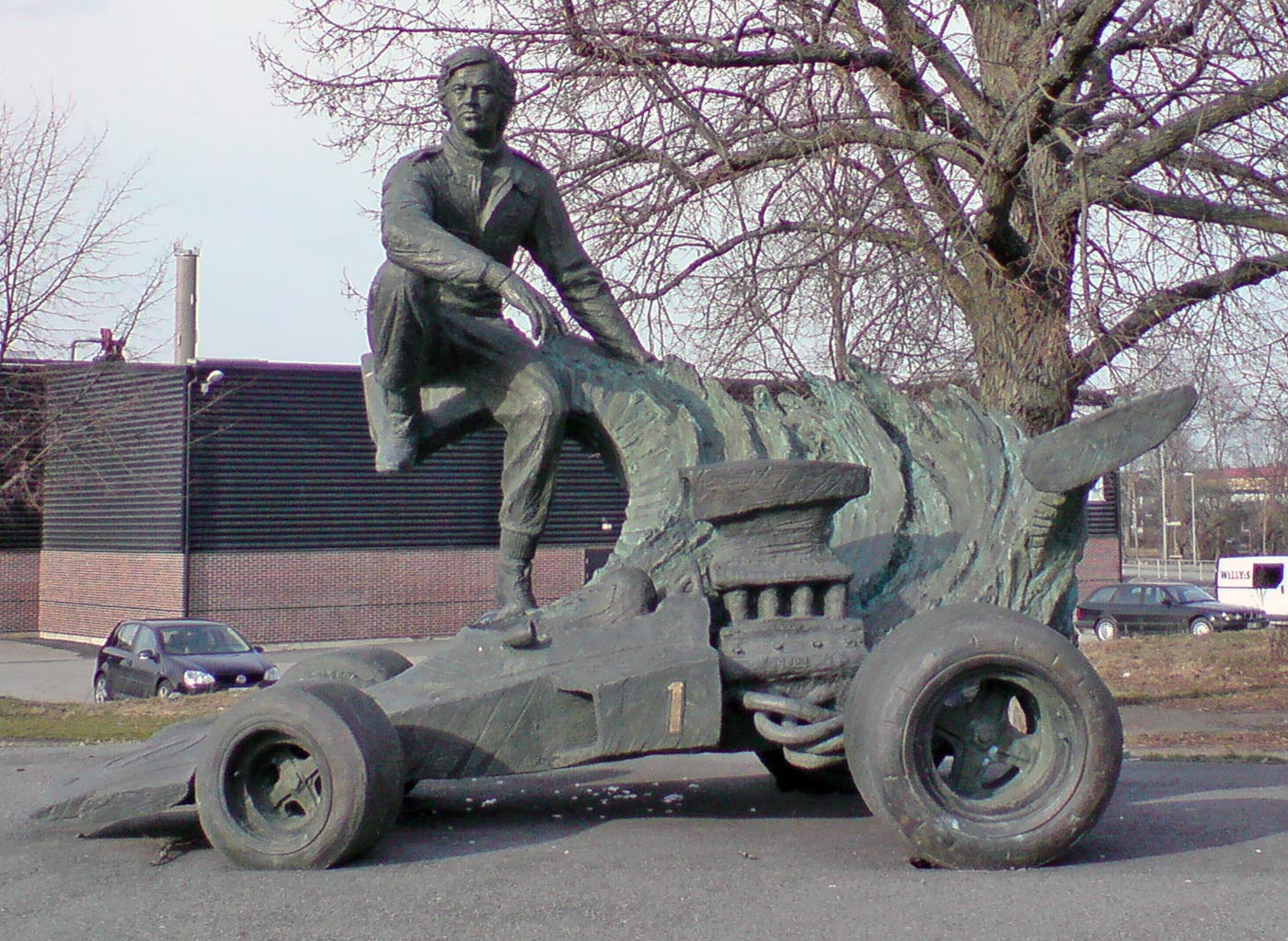
The statue of Formula 1 driver Ronnie Peterson in Almby, Örebro

== See also ==
- Brickebacken
- Olaus Petriskolan, a school in Örebro
