= Olaus Petriskolan =

Swedish school

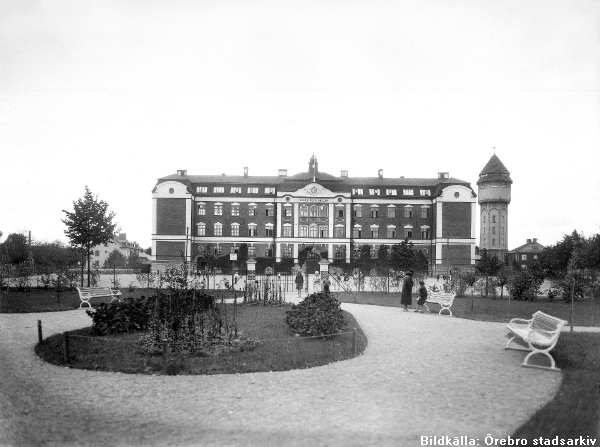
Olaus Petriskolan in the 1920s.

Olaus Petriskolan is a Swedish school in Örebro. It is a public school that opened in 1908 under the name "Norra folkskolan". It was created by architect Carl Nissen. Its name was changed in 1925.
