= Oset and Rynningeviken Nature Reserve =

Nature reserve in Sweden

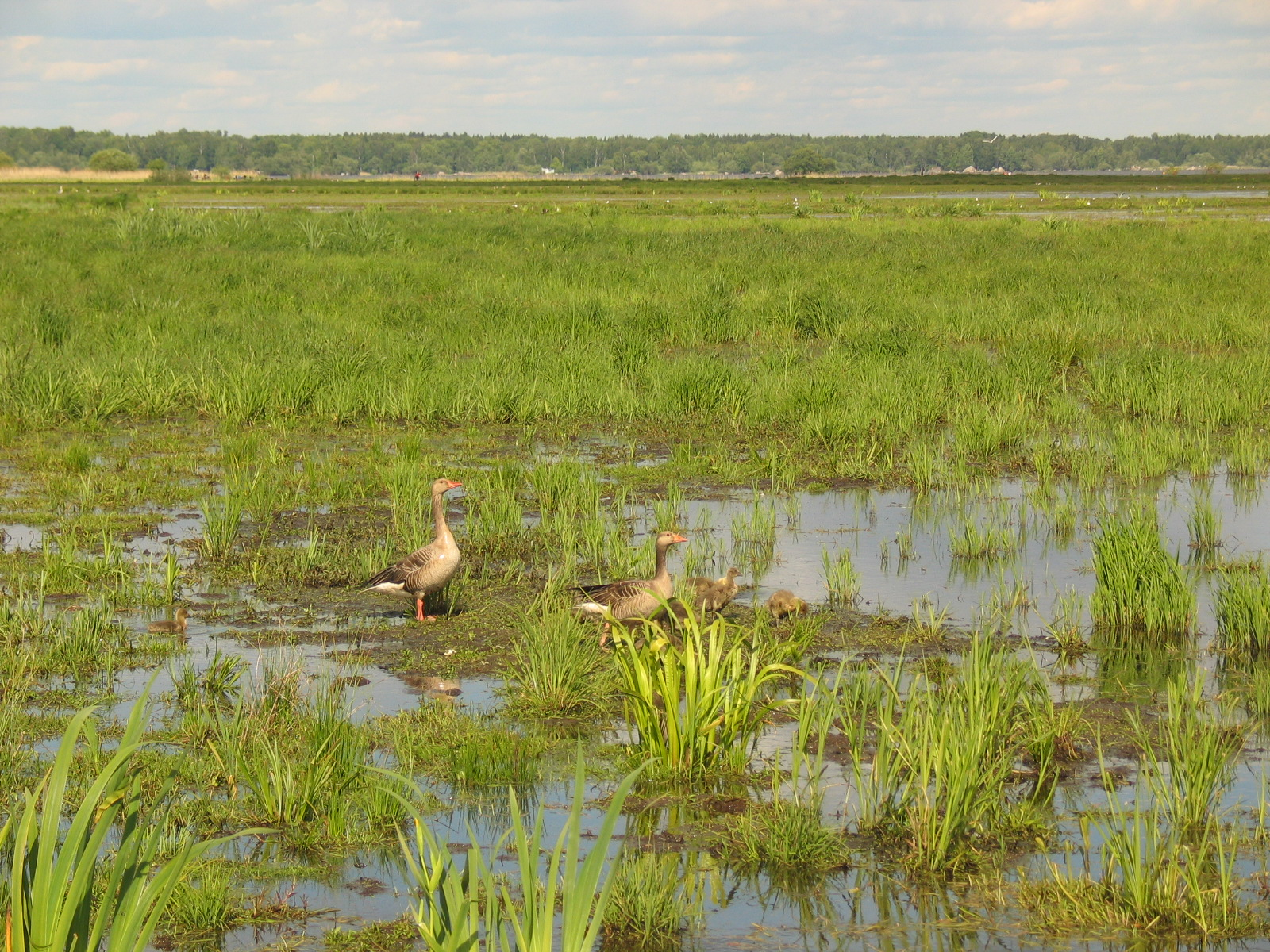
- Interactive map of Oset and Rynningeviken Nature Reserve
- Location: Sweden
- Nearest city: Örebro
- Coordinates: 59°16′55″N 15°16′10″E
- Established: 2015

Oset and Rynningeviken Nature Reserve (Swedish: Oset och Rynningevikens naturreservat) is a nature reserve in Örebro County in Sweden. It is part of the EU-wide Natura 2000-network.
