= Gunnel André =

Swedish theologian

Gunnel Margareta André (born August 6, 1946, in Örebro, Sweden) is a Swedish theologian, an ordained Lutheran minister in the Church of Sweden and an author.

== Biography ==
After studying theology, psychology and music at North Park University, Chicago, she continued her studies in 1968 at the Department of Religious Studies at the University of Uppsala, Sweden and the Swedish Theological Institute in Jerusalem, Israel. In 1980 she received a PhD degree (Doctor of Theology, Faculty of Theology) in Old Testament Exegesis, and became an assistant professor.

Gunnel André was one of the founders of the Student Union for students of religious studies and later of the Union of PhD students, of which she soon became president. This latter experience introduced her to the Swedish National Union of Students. She represented Swedish graduate-students of all categories in the royal commission ”The Future of Research, the Andrén-commission, so named after the chancellor, professor Carl-Gustaf Andrén. She served as a member of all the different theological boards of directors at different times. 1983 the Ministry of Education and Research appointed her a member of the Swedish National Agency for Higher Education, section for professions of culture- and information, and the departments of humanities and religious science.

1991-1994 she was a member of the Uppsala University Gender equality committee.. Gunnel André was appointed by the Swedish Government as a specialist and a philological expert to the Biblical Commission translating the Old Testament into Swedish. For over two decades she worked as scientific assistant to the editors of the Theological Dictionary of the Old Testament. 1982 she was elected member of the scientific Nathan Soederblom, and served as its president from 1995 to 1996. For many years she was the secretary of the Uppsala Exegetical Society and editorial secretary of its annual publication. 1985-1997 she was appointed a member of the board of the Swedish Bible Society.

Gunnel André is interested in many cultural activities. She is a member of Uppsala Harmony Heights Chorus. In 2011, the chorus became Nordic Champions in female barbershop singing for the second time. She has given classical concerts with the World Festival Choir in Russia, Lithuania and Hungary. When there is time she indulges in textile art. Since 2006 she has published poetry on the Swedish-language-site www.poeter.se and on the English-language-site www.poetbay.com since 2011 She expresses her politically liberal convictions in the Liberal People’s Party and she is a member of the local Parish Council.

2012 she was elected a member of the Swedish Writers’ Union.

== Family ==
1983-1993 Gunnel André was married to Professor Helmer Ringgren.

== Selected bibliography ==
- 10 articles in the Theological Dictionary of the Old Testament (1977–1988)
- Determining the Destiny. PQD in the Old Testament. Doctoral dissertation (1980)
- Ecstatic Prophecy in the Old Testament in Religious Ecstasy (1982)
- En annan kvinna eller en annans kvinna? (Another Woman or Another Man's Woman) Svensk Exegetisk Årsbok 50 (1985)
- Gammaltestamentliga texter. Påskdagen-Domsöndagen, årgång 2. (Commentaries on Old Testament texts) (1986)
- På söndag vill jag predika över den gammaltestamentliga texten – hur ska jag bära mig åt? Svensk kyrkotidning 25–26, 27-28 (On Sunday I want to preach over the Old Testament Text – How Do I Do That?) (1987)
- Visionärer, Vismän och Vi. (Visionairies, Wise men and WE) Together with Tryggve Kronholm (1992)
- Det mänskliga testamentet. En barnslig bok för vuxna. (The Human Testament. A Childish Book for Adults) (1994)
- Förord samt Israels Gud och erotiken eller Gudsbilden i Höga Visan eller Vad vet vi om guden som inte finns? Religion och Bibel LV. (Forward and The God of Israel and Eroticism or The Image of God in the Song of Songs or What do we know about the God who does not exist?) (1996)
- Gamla testamentets exegetik och trons illusoriska vetande. Svensk Exegetisk Årsbok 63. (Old Testament Exegesis and The Illusionary Knowledge of Faith) (1998)
- Det står skrivet - med inblickar mellan raderna. Kommentarer till Den svenska evangeliebokens gammaltestamentliga texter.(It is Written – with Insights between the Lines) (2011)
