= Gustavsvik =

Recreational facility in Örebro, Sweden

Coordinates: 59°15′40″N 15°11′35″E

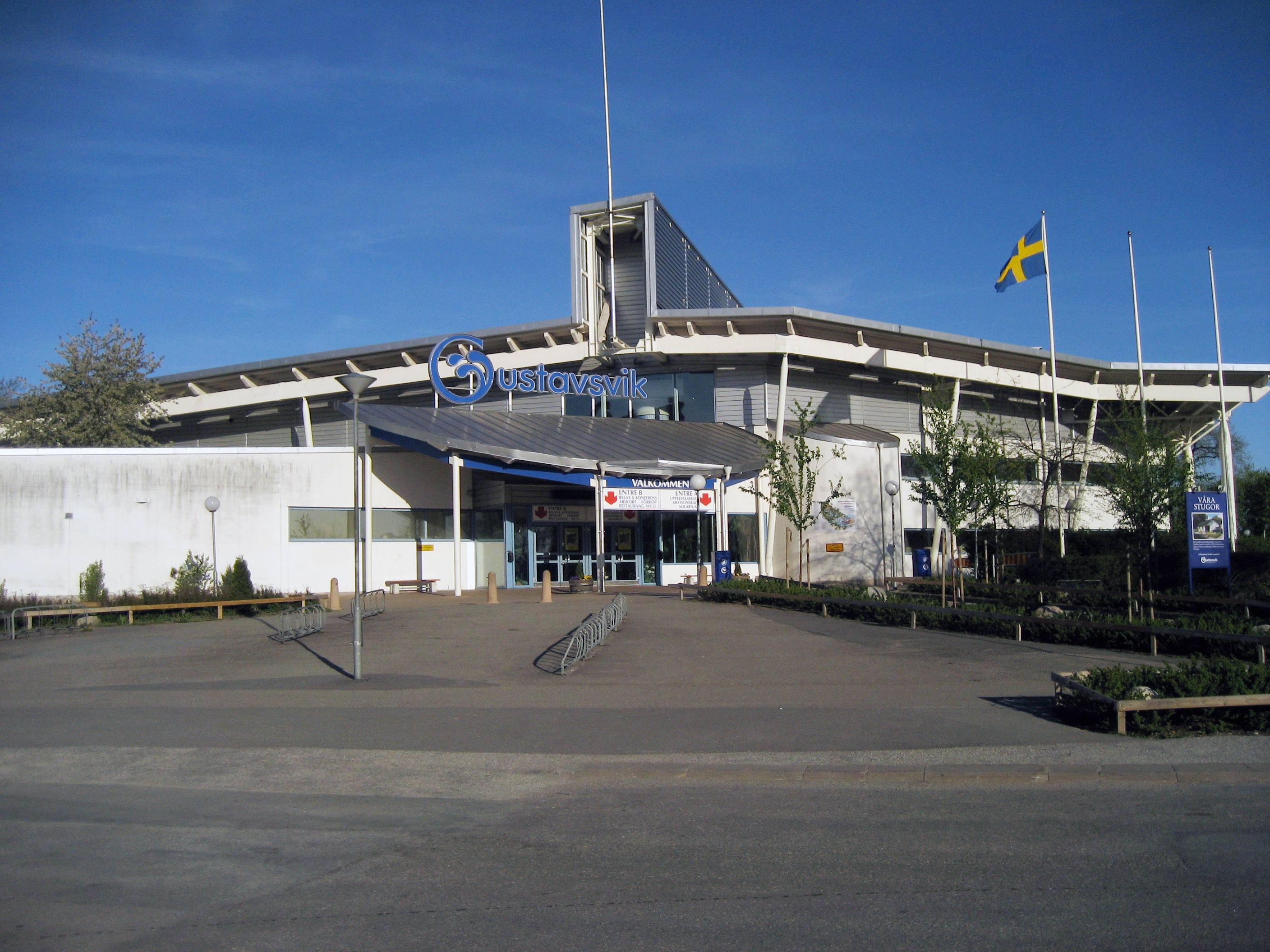
Gustavsvik

Gustavsvik is a major recreational facility in the town of Örebro which was built in 1963 and it includes the largest water park in Northern Europe. Gustavsvik is one of Sweden’s most visited tourist and leisure facilities. In 2012, it had around 100,000 visitors.

Northern Europe’s largest indoor swimming facility includes among other things a 50-metre long swimming pool with a diving tower and sunbeds, an adventure pool area with masses of attractions, a relaxation area, and a fitness centre with a gym and sunbeds. There are outdoor swimming pools outside, a water playground, a water slide, and large green areas suitable for sunbathing and other activities.

The facility is named after the owner of the brickyard which used to occupy the area where it is now situated. An open-air pool was built in 1935; the first temperate indoor pool was built in 1963. The facility was renovated in the early 2000s.

Gustavsvik is wholly owned by Örebro Municipality. Between 2011 and 2024, it had been jointly owned by the municipality and private companies.
