= Örebro Castle =

Coordinates: 59°16′26″N 15°12′55″E

- Örebro slott
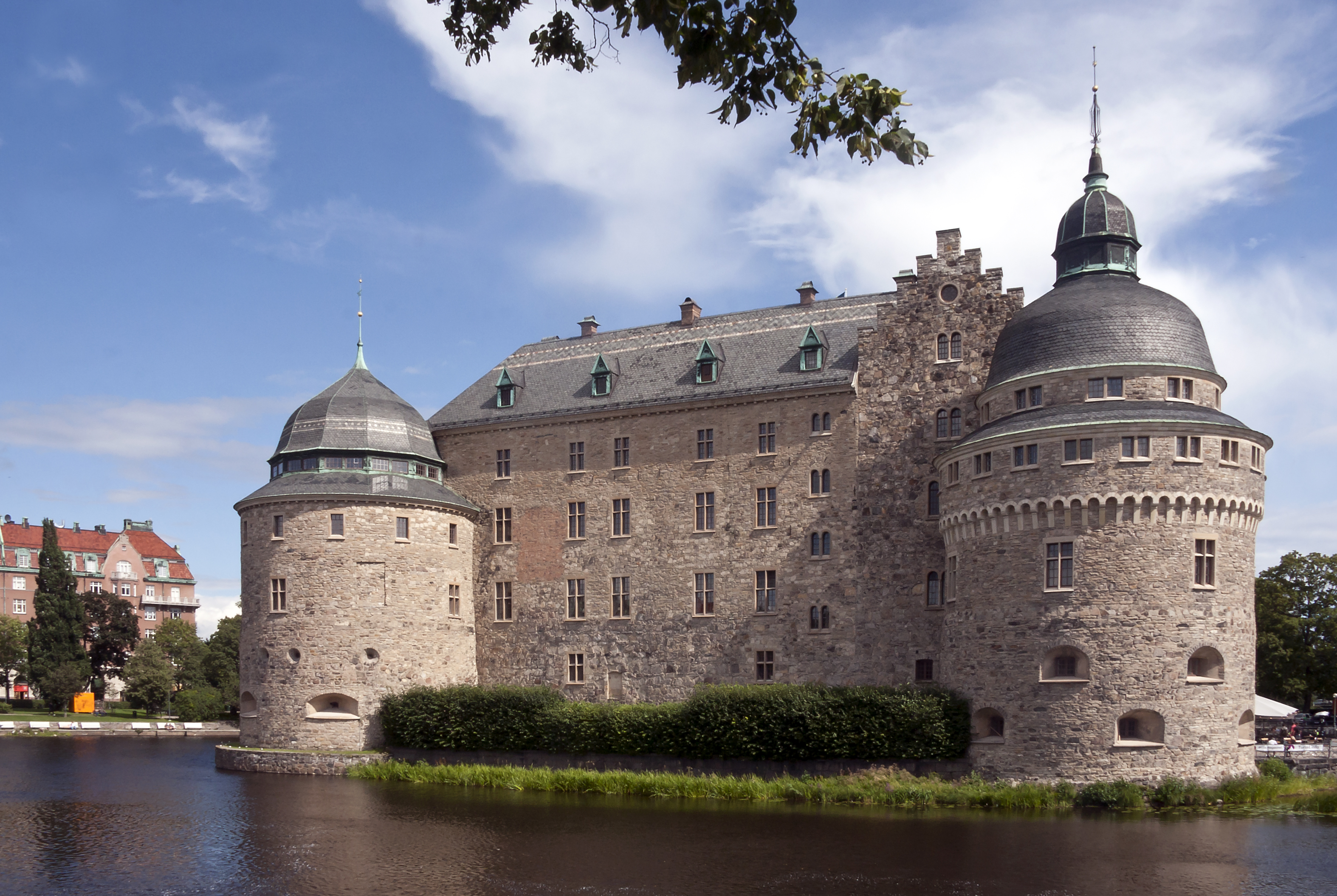
- Örebro Castle on an island in the Svartån.
- Interactive map of the Örebro Castle area

General information
- Type: Castle
- Architectural style: Renaissance
- Location: Örebro, Sweden
- Construction started: 14th century
- Owner: National Property Board

Technical details
- Material: Stone

Design and construction
- Architects: Mäster Ludvig; Herkules Mida; Jakob von Brüssel

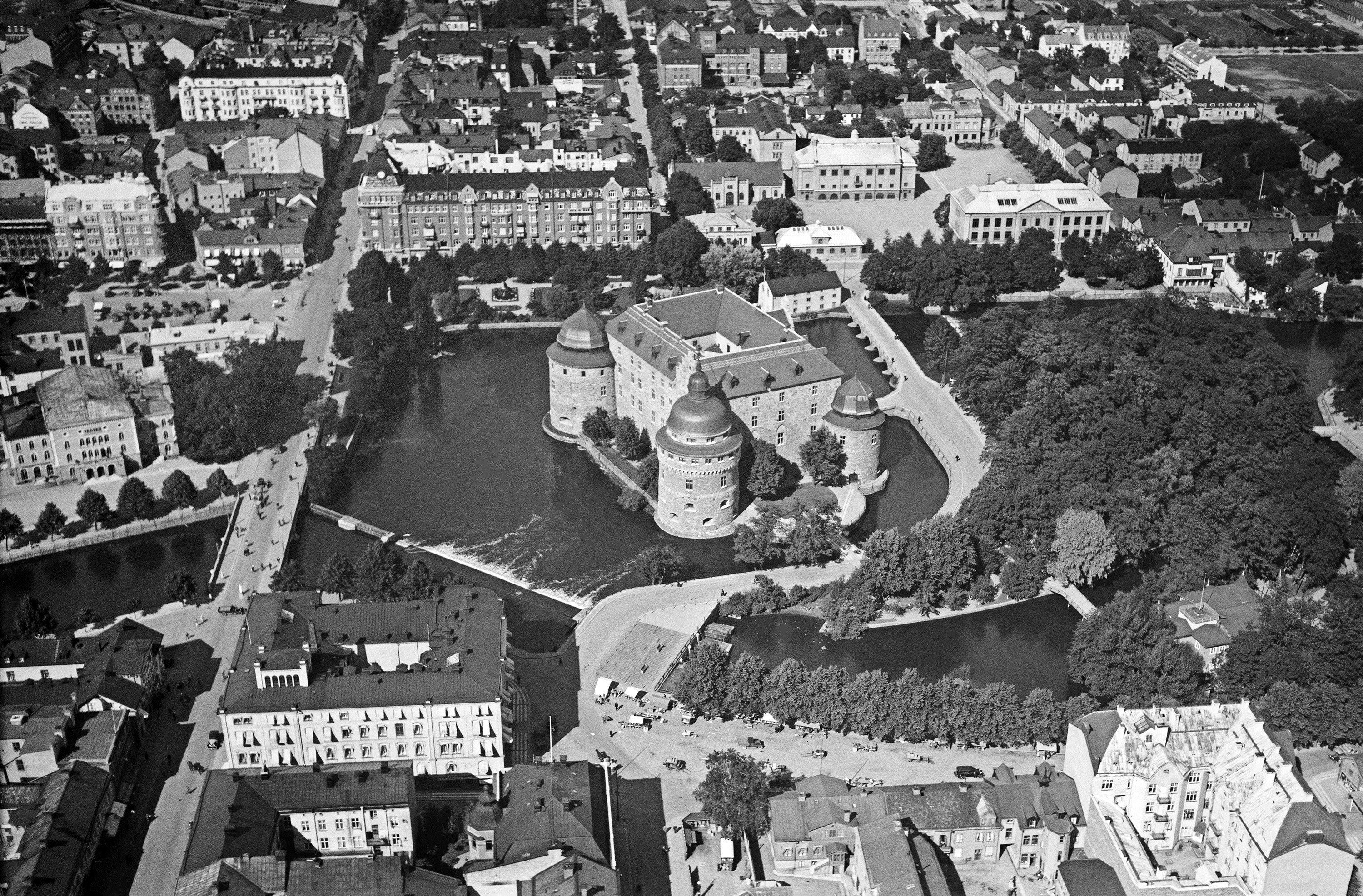
Aerial view of Örebro Castle and the surrounding city in 1937

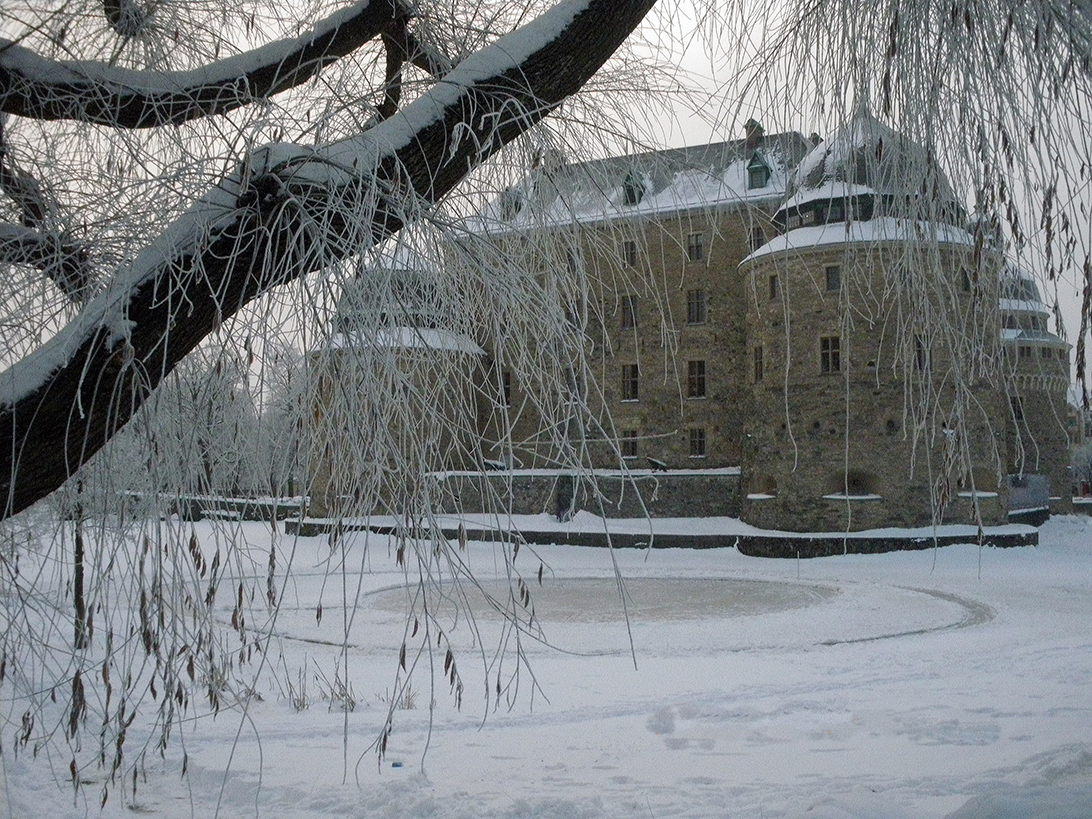
Örebro Castle in winter

Örebro Castle (Swedish: Örebro slott) is a medieval castle on the Svartån in Örebro, Sweden. The castle was expanded during the rule of the House of Vasa and was extensively rebuilt around 1900.

== History ==
The castle lies on an island in the river Svartån. The name of Örebro comes from the small stones ("ör") that the river transports. The second part of the word comes from the bridge ("bro").

The oldest part of the castle, a defence tower, was erected in the latter half of the 13th century. It was probably built during the reign of King Magnus IV of Sweden (1316–1374). In 1364, Albrecht von Mecklenburg (ca 1340–1412) captured a fortress in Örebro. That was probably a predecessor of today's castle, which was built on the small island within the Svartå river. The fortress is supposed to have consisted of a defence tower with a surrounding wall. The tower was added to in the 14th century to make a larger stronghold. Under King Charles IX of Sweden (1550–1611), the fortress was rebuilt into a Renaissance castle. Since 1764, the castle has served as the residence of the governor of Örebro County.
