= Göta Rosén =

Swedish politician

Göta Rosén (10 October 1904 – 3 October 2006) was a Swedish politician (Swedish Social Democratic Party).

Rosén was an MP of the Second Chamber of the Parliament of Sweden in 1940–1942.

Rosén was a social worker from 1931. Due to her efforts, spanking was banned in state institutions in 1948.
