= Svartån (Närke) =

River in Örebro County, Sweden

Coordinates: 59.2781°N 15.2786°E

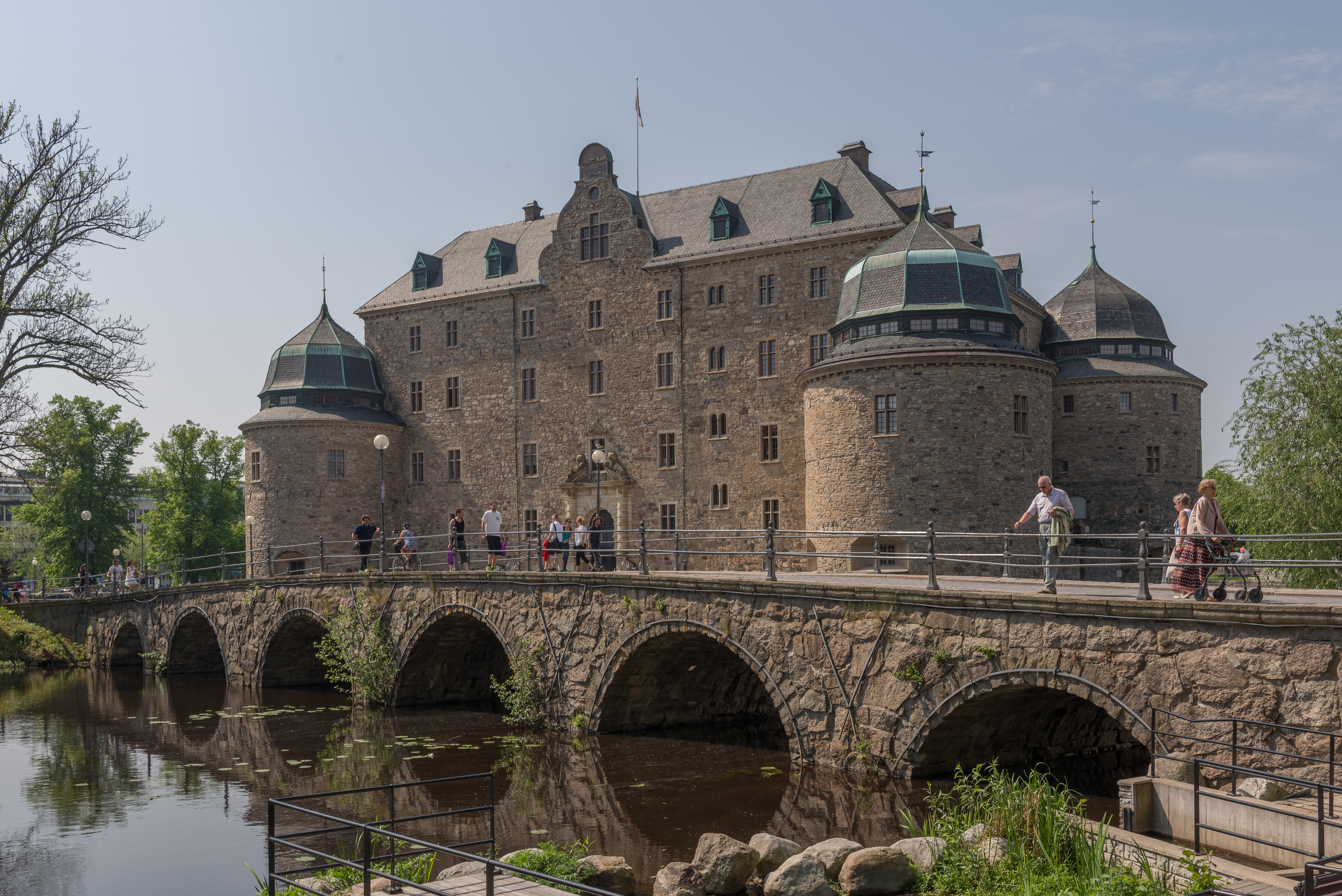
Kanslibron over Svartån at Örebro Castle.

Svartån is a river in Örebro County, Sweden, approximately 100 kilometers long with a drainage basin area of 1410 km^{2}. The river has its source at lake Ölen in Degerfors Municipality and flows south through the lakes Storbjörken and Lillbjörken and the mill town of Svartå. At lake Toften it joins with several streams from the south, flowing through Hasselfors to lake Teen, joining with Stavån. From Teen the river flows northeast over the Närke plain to the city of Örebro, passing Örebro Canal on its way east. East of Örebro the river passes through Skebäck and Oset, joining with Lillån before ending in Lake Hjälmaren.

Svartån is the main tributary of Lake Hjälmaren and Eskilstunaån, which in turn is the largest tributary of Lake Mälaren and Norrström in Stockholm, the main outlet into the Baltic Sea.

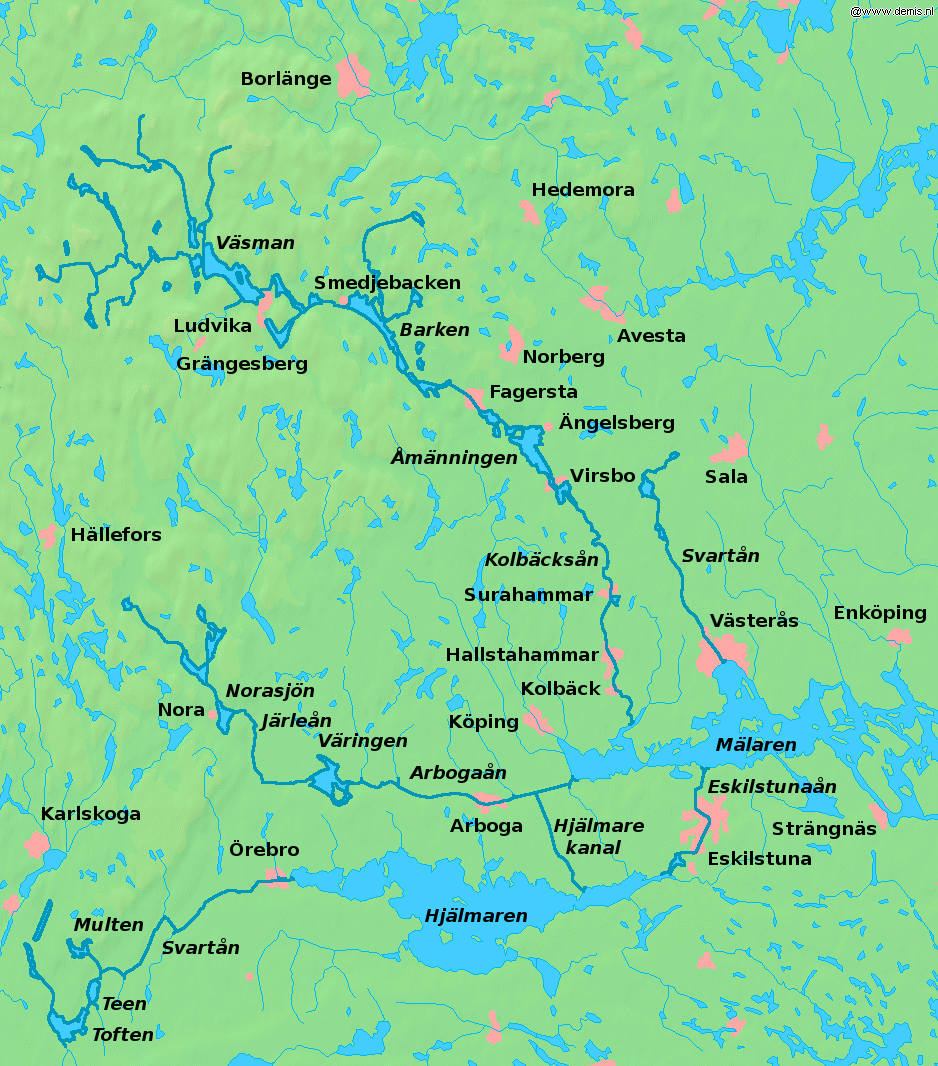
Western tributaries of Lake Mälaren.
