= Center of population =

Geographical point

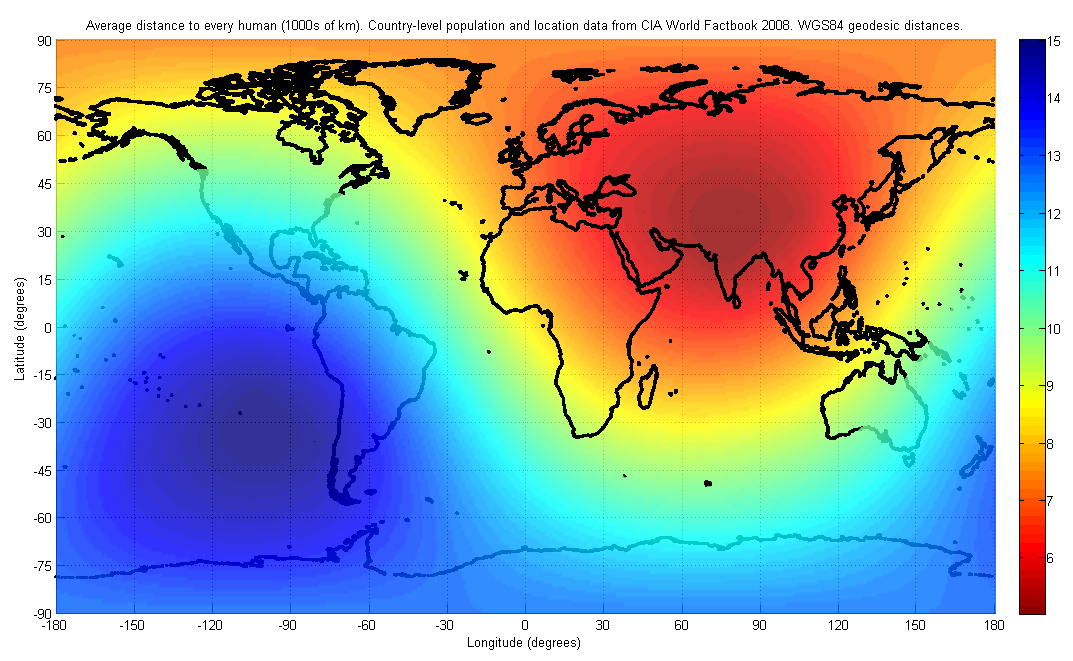
For representational purposes only: The point on Earth closest to everyone in the world on average was calculated to be in Central Asia, with a mean distance of 5,000 kilometers (3,000 mi). Its antipodal point is correspondingly the farthest point from everyone on Earth, and is located in the South Pacific near Easter Island, with a mean distance of 15,000 kilometers (9,300 mi). The data used by this figure is lumped at the country level, and is therefore precise only to country-scale distances.

In demographics, the center of population (or population center) of a region is a geographical point that describes a centerpoint of the region's population. There are several ways of defining such a "center point", leading to different geographical locations; these are often confused.

== Definitions ==
Three commonly used (but different) center points are:

1. the mean center, also known as the centroid or center of gravity;
2. the median center, which is the intersection of the median longitude and median latitude;
3. the geometric median, also known as Weber point, Fermat–Weber point, or point of minimum aggregate travel.

A further complication is caused by the curved shape of the Earth. Different center points are obtained depending on whether the center is computed in three-dimensional space, or restricted to the curved surface, or computed using a flat map projection.

=== Mean center ===
The mean center, or centroid, is the point on which a rigid, weightless map would balance perfectly, if the population members are represented as points of equal mass.

Mathematically, the centroid is the point to which the population has the smallest possible sum of squared distances. It is easily found by taking the arithmetic mean of each coordinate. If defined in three-dimensional space, the centroid of points on the Earth's surface is actually inside the Earth. This point could then be projected back to the surface. Alternatively, one could define the centroid directly on a flat map projection; this is, for example, the definition that the US Census Bureau uses.

Contrary to a common misconception, the centroid does not minimize the average distance to the population. That property belongs to the geometric median.

=== Median center ===
The median center is the intersection of two perpendicular lines, each of which divides the population into two equal halves. Typically these two lines are chosen to be a parallel (a line of latitude) and a meridian (a line of longitude). In that case, this center is easily found by taking separately the medians of the population's latitude and longitude coordinates. John Tukey called this the cross median.

=== Geometric median ===
The geometric median is the point to which the population has the smallest possible sum of distances (or equivalently, the smallest average distance). Because of this property, it is also known as the point of minimum aggregate travel. Unfortunately, there is no direct closed-form expression for the geometric median; it is typically computed using iterative methods.

== Determination ==
In practical computation, decisions are also made on the granularity (coarseness) of the population data, depending on population density patterns or other factors. For instance, the center of population of all the cities in a country may be different from the center of population of all the states (or provinces, or other subdivisions) in the same country. Different methods may yield different results.

Practical uses for finding the center of population include locating possible sites for forward capitals, such as Brasília, Astana or Austin, and, along the same lines, to make tax collection easier. Practical selection of a new site for a capital is a complex problem that depends also on population density patterns and transportation networks.

== World ==
It is important to use a method that does not depend on a two-dimensional projection when dealing with the entire world. In a study from the French Institut national d'études démographiques, the solution methodology deals only with the globe. As a result, the answer is independent of which map projection is used or where it is centered. As described above, the exact location of the center of population will depend on both the granularity of the population data used, and the distance metric. With geodesic distances as the metric, and a granularity of 1,000 kilometers (600 mi), meaning that two population centers within 1000 km of each other are treated as part of a larger common population center of intermediate location, the world's center of population is found to lie "at the crossroads between China, India, Pakistan and Tajikistan" with an average distance of 5,200 kilometers (3,200 mi) to all humans. The data used in the reference support this result to a precision of only a few hundred kilometers, hence the exact location is not known.

Another analysis, using city-level population data, found that the world's center of population is close to Almaty, Kazakhstan.

== By country ==
=== Antigua and Barbuda ===
In 2011, the center of population of Antigua (excluding Barbuda) was located in St. Claire.

=== Australia ===
Australia's population centroid is in central New South Wales. By 1996, it had moved only a little to the north-west since 1911. It moved only 1.4 km north in 2022 from the previous year and in 2023 moved 1.9 km west compared to 2022, located 40 km east of Ivanhoe.

=== Canada ===
In Canada, a 1986 study placed the point of minimum aggregate travel just north of Toronto in the city of Richmond Hill, and moving westward at a rate of approximately 2 meters per day.

=== China ===
China's population centroid has wandered within southern Henan from 1952 to 2005. Incidentally, the two end point dates are remarkably close to each other. China also plots its economic centroid or center of economy/GDP, which has also wandered, and is generally located at the eastern Henan borders.

=== Estonia ===
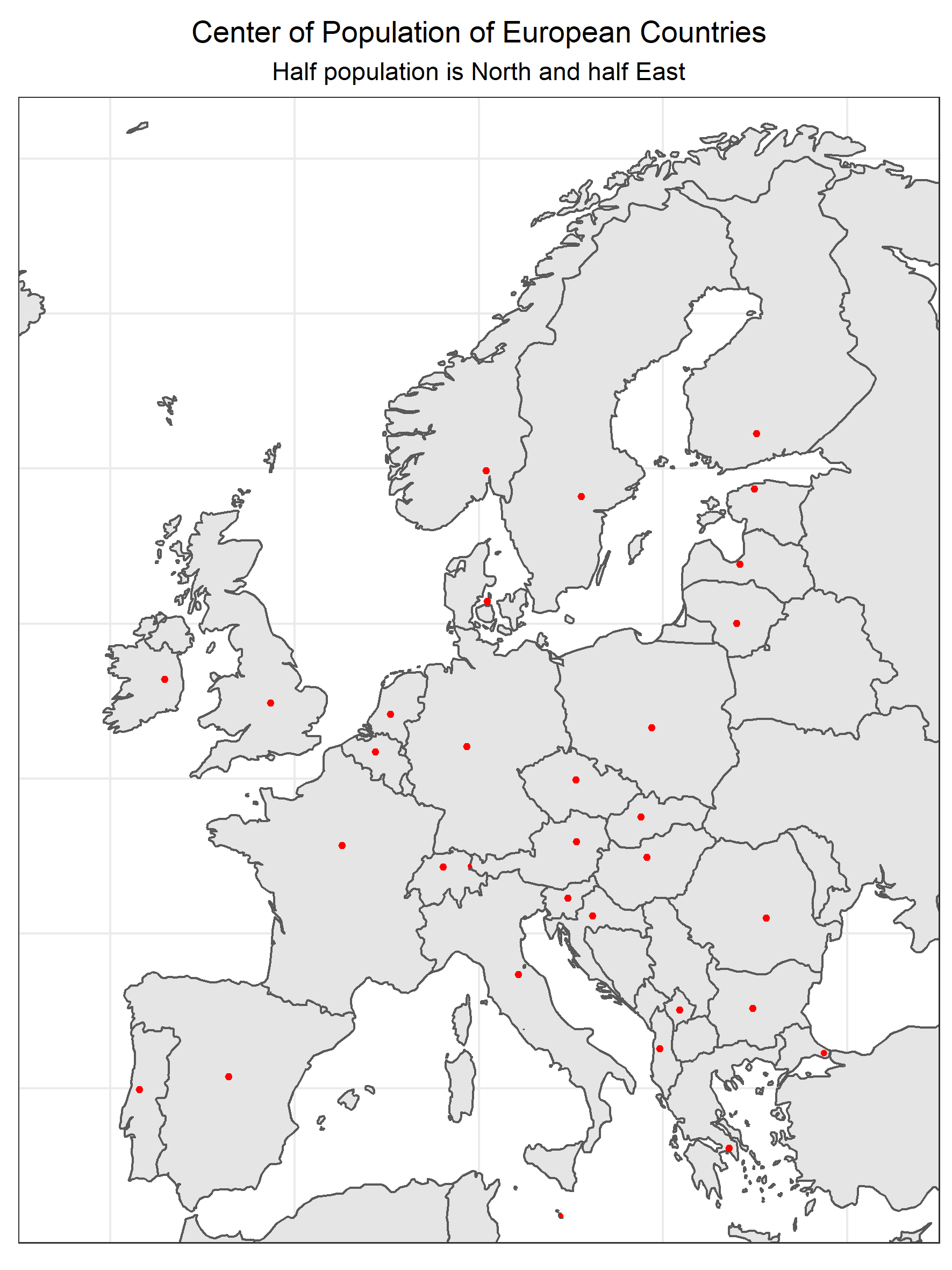
European Countries median center of population in 2011

The center of population of Estonia was on the northwestern shore of Lake Võrtsjärv in 1913 and moved an average of 6 km northwest with every decade until the 1970s. During the Soviet occupation, forced immigration from the rest of the Soviet Union to mostly Tallinn and Northeastern Estonia resulted the center of population moving faster towards north and continuing urbanization has seen it move northwest towards Tallinn since the 1990s. The center of population according to the 2011 census was in Jüri, just 6 km southeast from the border of Tallinn.

=== Finland ===
In Finland, the point of minimum aggregate travel is located in the former municipality of Hauho. It is moving slightly to the south-west-west every year because people are moving out of the peripheral areas of northern and eastern Finland.

=== Germany ===
In Germany, the centroid of the population is located in Spangenberg, Hesse, close to Kassel.

=== Great Britain ===
The centre of population in Great Britain did not move significantly in the 20th century. In 1901, it was in Rodsley, Derbyshire and in 1911 in Longford. In 1971 it was at Newhall, Swadlincote, South Derbyshire and in 2000, it was in Appleby Parva, Leicestershire. Using the 2011 census the population centre can be calculated at Snarestone, Swadlincote.

=== Ireland ===
The center of population of the entire island of Ireland is located near Kilcock, County Kildare. This is significantly further east than the Geographical centre of Ireland, reflecting the disproportionately large cities of the east of the island (Belfast and Dublin). The center of population of the Republic of Ireland is located southwest of Edenderry, County Offaly.

=== Japan ===
The centroid of population of Japan is in Gifu Prefecture, almost directly north of Nagoya city, and has been moving east-southeast for the past few decades. Since 2010, the only large regions in Japan with significant population growth have been in Greater Tokyo and Okinawa Prefecture.

=== New Zealand ===
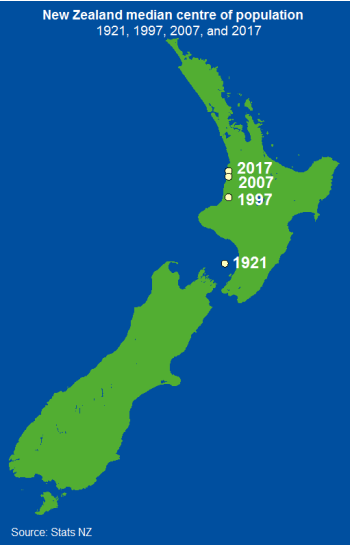
New Zealand's median center of population over time

In June 2008, New Zealand's median center of population was located near Taharoa, around 100 km (65 mi) southwest of Hamilton on the North Island's west coast. In 1900 it was near Nelson and has been moving steadily north (towards Auckland, the country's most populous city) ever since.

=== Sweden ===
The demographical center of Sweden (using the median center definition) is Hjortkvarn in Hallsberg Municipality, Örebro county. Between the 1989 and 2007 census the point moved a few kilometres to the south, due to a decreasing population in northern Sweden and immigration to the south.

=== Russia ===
The center of population in the Russian Federation is calculated by A. K. Gogolev to be at 56°26′N 53°04′E as of 2010, 46.5 km (28.9 mi) south-southwest of Izhevsk.

=== Taiwan ===
The center of population of Taiwan is located in Heping District, Taichung.

=== United States ===
The mean center of the United States population (using the centroid definition) has been calculated for each U.S. Census since 1790. Over the last two centuries, it has progressed westward and, since 1930, southwesterly, reflecting population drift. For example, in 2010, the mean center was located near Plato, Missouri, in the south-central part of the state, whereas, in 1790, it was in Kent County, Maryland, 47 miles (76 km) east-northeast of the future federal capital, Washington, D.C.

== See also ==
- Extremes on Earth

== Sources ==
- Bellone F. and Cunningham R. (1993). "All Roads Lead to... Laxton, Digby and Longford." Statistics Canada 1991 Census Short Articles Series.
