= Sköllersta IF =

Swedish football club

- Full name: Sköllersta Idrottsförening
- Ground: Sköllervallen IP; Sköllersta; Sweden
- Chairman: Petra Almlöf
- Head coach: Mårten Eriksson
- Coach: Kricke Widlund
- League: Division 3 Västra Svealand
- 2010: Division 4 Örebro, 1st (Promoted)
Home colours	Away colours

Sköllersta IF is a Swedish football club located in Sköllersta in Hallsberg Municipality, Örebro County.

== Background ==
Since their foundation Sköllersta IF has participated mainly in the middle and lower divisions of the Swedish football league system. The club currently plays in Division 5 Örebro Län which is the seventh tier of Swedish football. They play their home matches at the Sköllervallen IP in Sköllersta.

Sköllersta IF are affiliated to Örebro Läns Fotbollförbund.

== Recent history ==
In recent seasons Sköllersta IF have competed in the following divisions:

Alla tidigare tabeller 2014 - Division VI, Örebro Län
2013 - Division V, Örebro Län
2012 - Division III, Västra Svealand
2011 - Division III, Västra Svealand
2010 - Division IV, Örebro Län
2009 - Division III, Västra Svealand
2008 - Division IV, Örebro Län
2007 - Division IV, Örebro Län
2006 - Division IV, Örebro Län
2005 - Division IV, Örebro Län
2004 - Division IV, Örebro Län
2003 - Division IV, Örebro Län
2002 - Division IV, Örebro Län
2001 - Division IV, Örebro Län
2000 - Division III, Västra Svealand
1999 - Division IV, Örebro Län

== Attendances ==
In recent seasons Sköllersta IF have had the following average attendances:

Season	Average attendance	Division / Section	Level
2007	Not available	Div 4 Örebro Län	Tier 6
2008	47	Div 4 Örebro Län	Tier 6
2009	95	Div 3 Västra Svealand	Tier 5
2010	73	Div 4 Örebro Län	Tier 6

* Attendances are provided in the Publikliga sections of the Svenska Fotbollförbundet website.
