= Frans Otto Eriksson =

Swedish baker and convicted thief and murderer

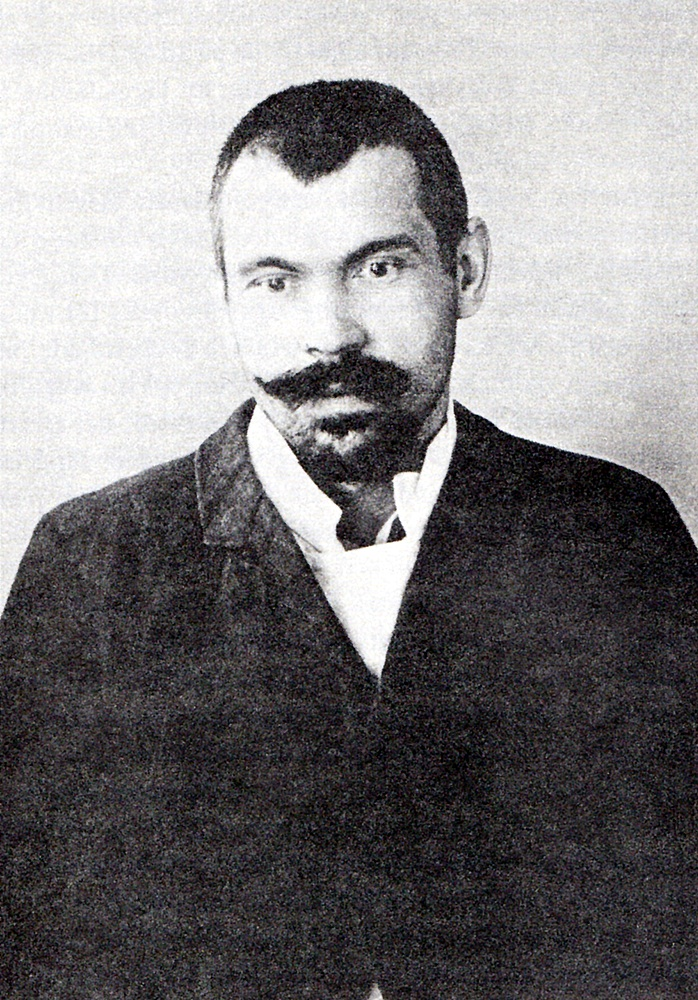
- Eriksson at his arrest in 1909
- Born: 15 April 1876; Badelunda, Västerås, Sweden
- Died: 7 June 1953 (aged 77); Västerås, Sweden
- Other names: Svarta Hästen ("The Black Horse")
- Occupations: Baker, farm hand
- Status: Paroled on 31 October 1930
- Convictions: Embezzlement and shoplifting – 1900; Shoplifting – 1904; Murder – 1910
- Penalty: Life imprisonment

Frans Otto Eriksson (15 April 1867 – 7 June 1953), also known as Svarta Hästen ("The Black Horse"), was a Swedish baker and a convicted thief and murderer. He was initially involved in petty crimes between baking jobs, but Eriksson joined a double-murder conspiracy on the promise of a monetary reward. Despite being caught, he escaped the death penalty and was sentenced to life imprisonment, of which he served nearly 21 years.

== Background ==
=== Early life ===
Eriksson was born in Badelunda, Västerås, Sweden. His family moved to Stenby, Adelsö, when he was six years old. At the age of thirteen, Eriksson moved back to Västerås, where he lived until his church confirmation.

=== Education and work ===
After his confirmation, Eriksson became an apprentice with a local baker. In the early 1890s, Eriksson moved to Stockholm, where he held jobs at several bakeries. He later moved to Gnesta. Around 1900, Eriksson moved to Obbola, where he found work at a local store. After about a year, he became very poor and began to live as a vagrant. In July 1907, Eriksson found employment at a baker's shop in Vretstorp, where the owner was pleased with his work.

== Crimes ==
In September 1900, Eriksson borrowed a suit from a friend. When he did not return the suit, the friend pressed charges against him; Eriksson was sentenced to two months imprisonment for shoplifting and embezzlement. On 8 July 1904, he was convicted of shoplifting for a second time after stealing clothes from a shop in Haverö. He was sentenced to prison for two months, which he served in Sundsvall. In January 1905, Eriksson and a friend, who were both drunk, stole three cans of lobster in Sollefteå. He was again sentenced to two months in jail, plus an additional year to be served in Härnösand. In 1909, Eriksson moved to the city of Leksand.

=== Double murders ===
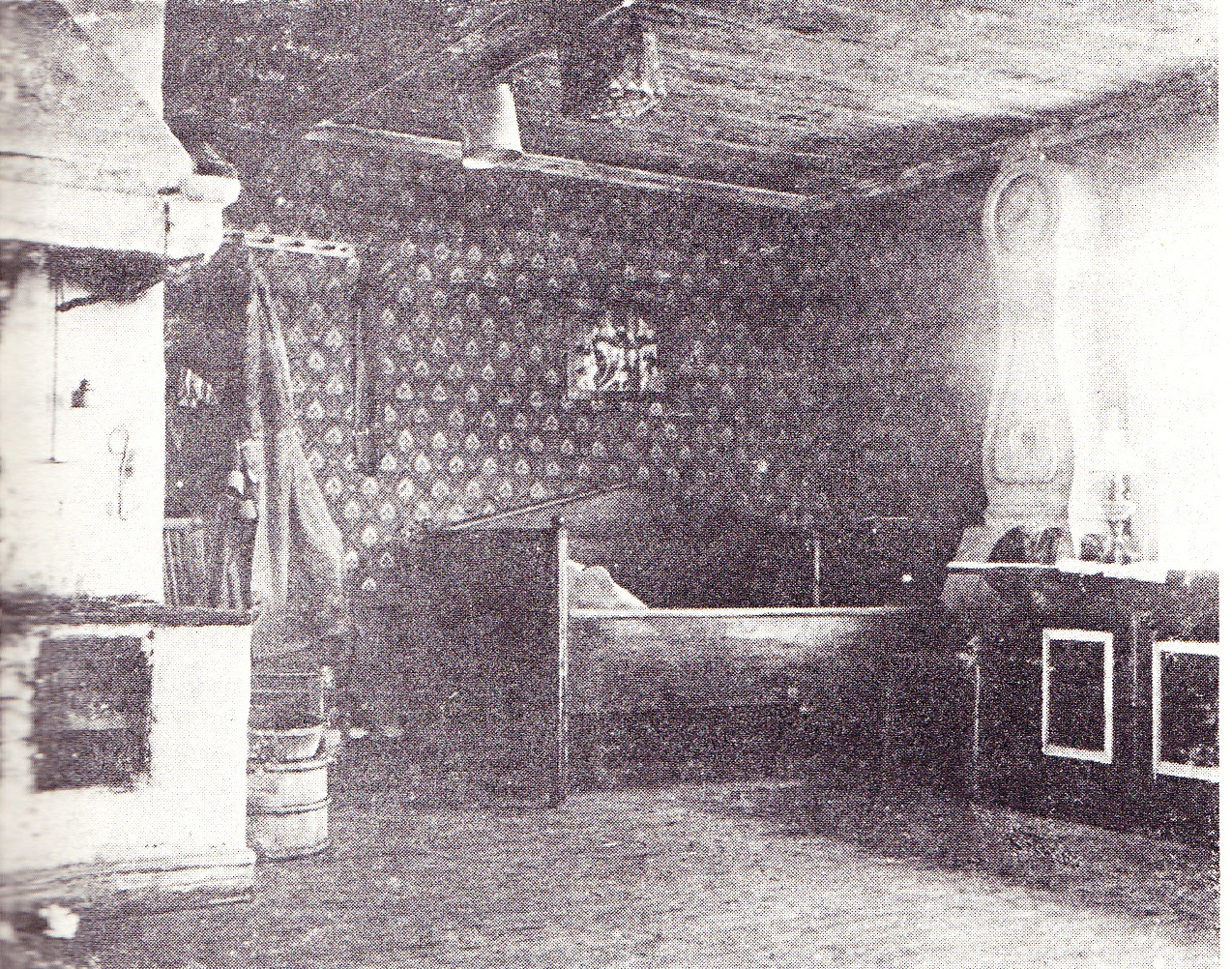
Crime scene at the Dunders' home.

In the village of Heden, Leksand, Eriksson moved in with Kerstis Karin Olsdotter (also known as "Jutta"), and Fredrik Alfred Vestlund (also known as "Löfstalunsen"). Olsdotter lived a promiscuous life and had a poor reputation in the village. Olsdotter was informed that a former corporal named Daniel Dunder born 1827, and his wife Kerstin born 1834, had recently sold their last cow to a neighbour and had received a substantial sum of money. In need of money, Eriksson, Olsdotter and Vestlund conspired to rob the Dunder couple on 11 December 1909. To avoid later identification by the victims, the trio decided to poison them. Vestlund served the Dunders coffee laced with arsenic, while Eriksson and Olsdotter stood guard outside the Dunders' home. After the Dunders had died from the poison, the trio tried to destroy the evidence of murder, starting a fire in the fireplace so it would appear the couple had died from carbon monoxide poisoning.

=== Discovery of the bodies and trial ===
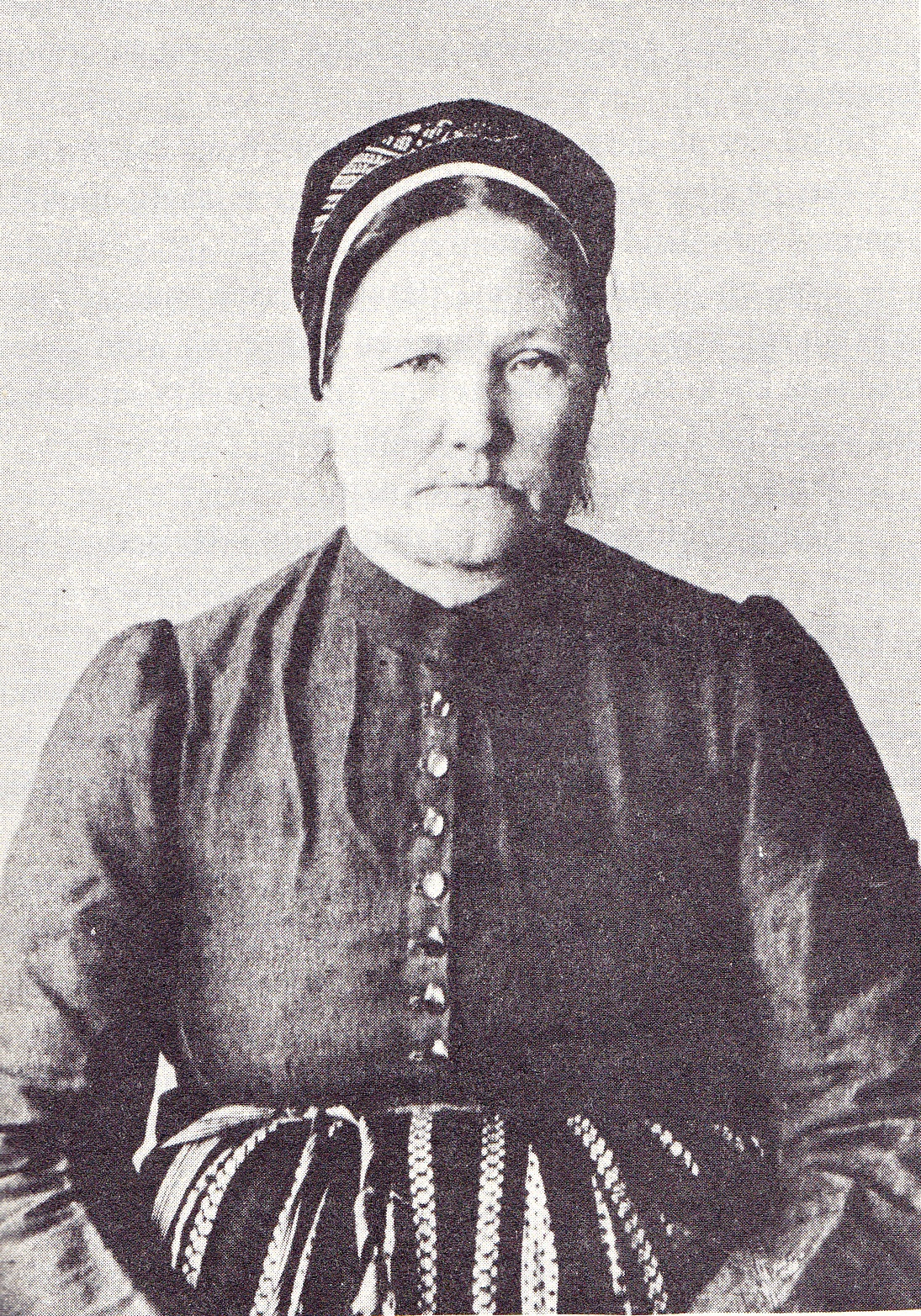
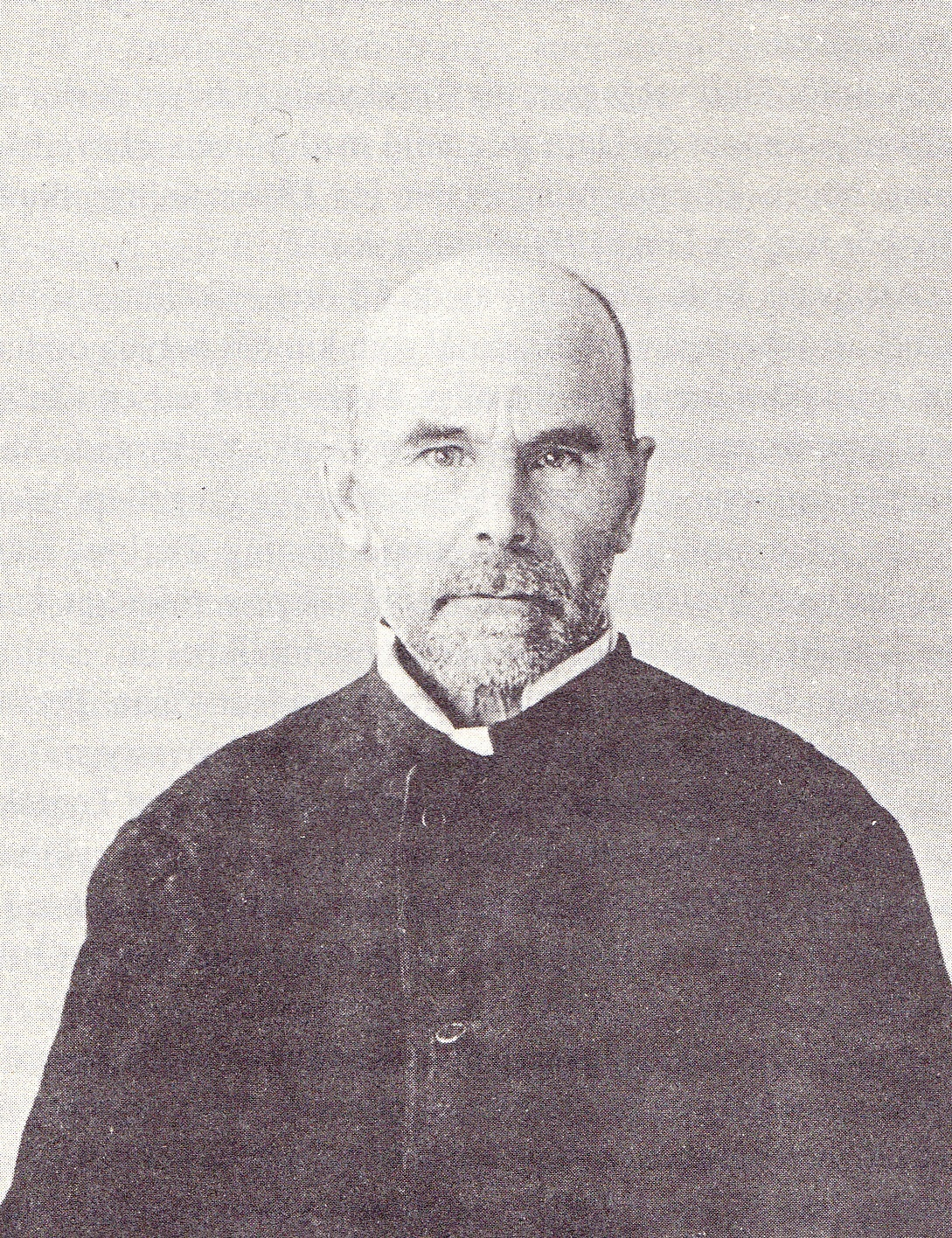
Olsdotter and Vestlund upon their arrest in 1909.

A neighbour discovered the dead couple and the police quickly suspected murder. The available evidence pointed to Eriksson, Olsdotter and Vestlund, who were all arrested in a matter of days. By late December they were taken to Falu prison by Christmas and on 10 January 1910, legal proceedings started in Leksand. Olsdotter was sentenced to death for plotting the murders while Eriksson received life imprisonment. Vestlund, who was considered the mastermind behind the murders, was also sentenced to death. On 15 July of that year, the court denied their appeals but on 28 October 1910, the sentences against Vestlund and Olsdotter were commuted to life imprisonment. Eriksson and Vestlund served their time in Långholmen Prison in Stockholm while Olsdotter served her time at a women's prison in Växjö.

=== Imprisonment ===
Eriksson served the first years of his sentence on the island of Långholmen. In January 1916, he was transferred to Malmö. During his time in prison, Eriksson was involved in a number of fights because of his temperament, which may have contributed to the denials of his appeals for clemency. In 1918, he was sent to Karlskrona before he was transferred back in Långholmen in 1920. In 1922, Eriksson was transferred to a low-security prison in Mariestad that specialized in farming, and was permitted to work there with horses.

=== Appeals ===
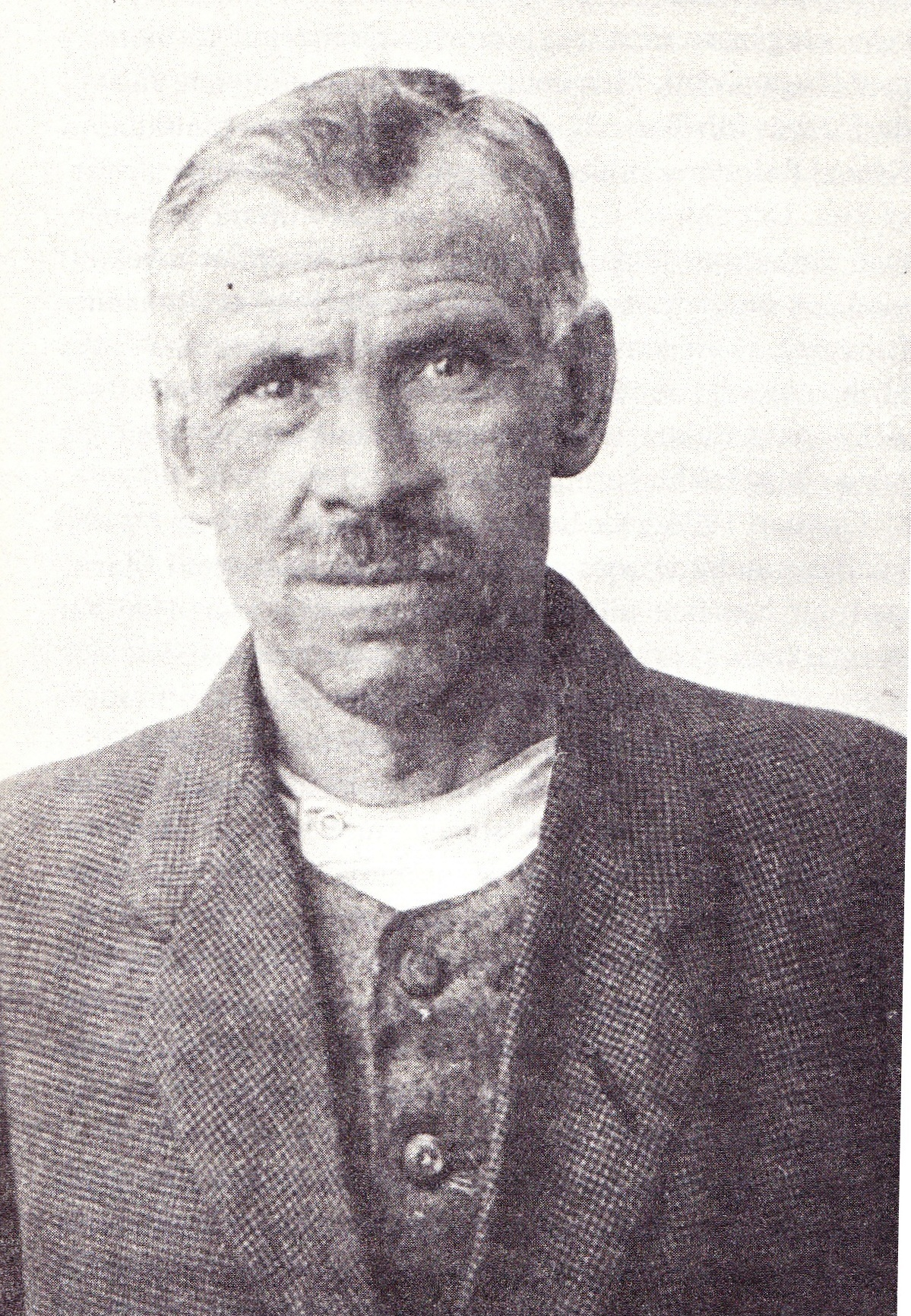
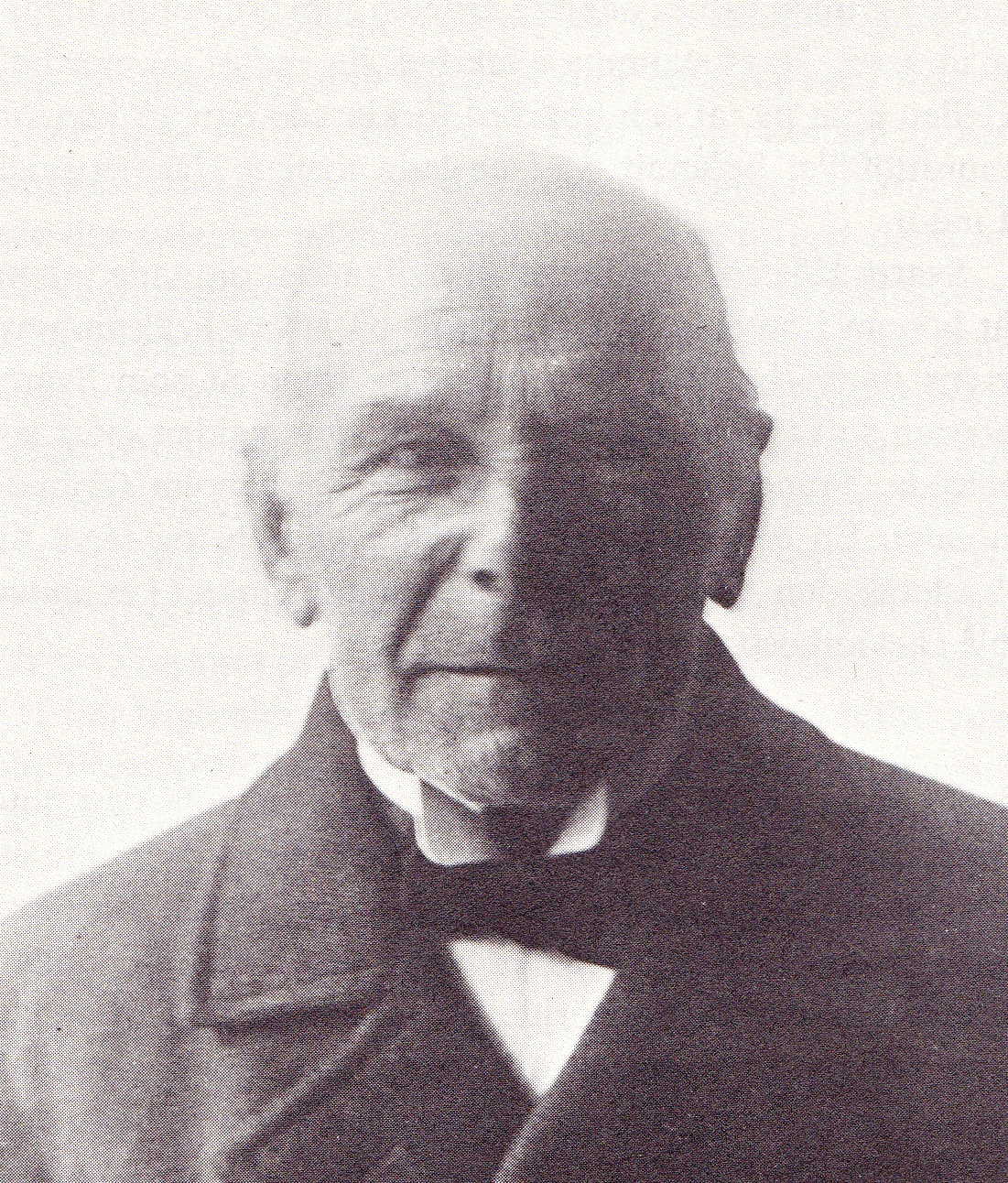
Eriksson and Vestlund upon their release in 1930.

In November 1925, Eriksson wrote his first appeal for clemency, which was denied. He made additional requests in 1926, 1928 and 1929 without success. On 31 October 1930, his clemency request was approved upon his fifth appeal.

== Later life ==
Eriksson's return to freedom was full of hardship; he had a difficult time finding work as a farm hand in Stockholm. He also suffered from paranoia. In 1953, he was placed in a nursing home in Västerås, where he died of cancer on 7 June 1953. His remains were buried in the cemetery at Skogskyrkogården on 20 January 1954.
