= Hjortkvarn =

- Location within Örebro Location within Sweden
- Coordinates: 58°54′N 15°26′E
- Country: Sweden
- Province: Närke
- County: Örebro County
- Municipality: Hallsberg Municipality

Area
  - Total: 0.91 km^{2} (0.35 sq mi)

Population (31 December 2010)
  - Total: 238
  - Density: 261/km^{2} (680/sq mi)
- Time zone: UTC+1 (CET)
  - Summer (DST): UTC+2 (CEST)

Hjortkvarn is a locality situated in Hallsberg Municipality, Örebro County, Sweden with 238 inhabitants in 2010.

In 2007, Hjortkvarn was named Sweden's demographical centre.
