= Sköllersta =

- Location within Örebro Location within Sweden
- Coordinates: 59°08′N 15°19′E
- Country: Sweden
- Province: Närke
- County: Örebro County
- Municipality: Hallsberg Municipality

Area
  - Total: 1.64 km^{2} (0.63 sq mi)

Population (31 December 2010)
  - Total: 1,131
  - Density: 689/km^{2} (1,780/sq mi)
- Time zone: UTC+1 (CET)
  - Summer (DST): UTC+2 (CEST)

Sköllersta is a locality situated in Hallsberg Municipality, Örebro County, Sweden with 1,131 inhabitants in 2010. Sköllersta is located near the tripoint where the municipalities of Hallsberg, Kumla and Örebro meet. It is about 20 kilometres (12 mi) south of the city of Örebro itself.

Skyllersta Hundred, Skyllersta härad or Sköllersta härad, was a hundred of Närke in Sweden.

== Riksdag elections ==
| Year | % | Votes | V | S | MP | C | L | KD | M | SD | NyD | Left | Right |
|---|---|---|---|---|---|---|---|---|---|---|---|---|---|
| 1973 | 90.1 | 764 | 2.5 | 32.1 | | 42.4 | 11.5 | 3.1 | 8.2 | | | 34.6 | 62.4 |
| 1976 | 91.9 | 921 | 2.9 | 30.2 | | 45.3 | 11.0 | 1.6 | 8.9 | | | 33.1 | 65.1 |
| 1979 | 92.8 | 1,046 | 3.5 | 33.0 | | 35.8 | 11.1 | 2.7 | 13.6 | | | 36.5 | 60.4 |
| 1982 | 94.0 | 967 | 2.5 | 39.7 | 2.1 | 21.2 | 8.4 | 5.1 | 21.1 | | | 42.2 | 50.7 |
| 1985 | 91.2 | 943 | 4.0 | 37.6 | 2.1 | 20.6 | 17.0 | | 18.3 | | | 41.7 | 55.9 |
| 1988 | 88.6 | 940 | 4.6 | 39.0 | 4.0 | 18.8 | 16.0 | 5.3 | 11.6 | | | 47.7 | 46.5 |
| 1991 | 87.8 | 944 | 4.3 | 32.4 | 3.0 | 11.8 | 11.5 | 12.8 | 15.9 | | 8.2 | 36.7 | 52.0 |
| 1994 | 90.2 | 968 | 4.6 | 45.9 | 4.5 | 11.0 | 8.5 | 7.4 | 15.7 | | 1.4 | 55.1 | 42.6 |
| 1998 | 83.9 | 914 | 14.0 | 34.9 | 5.7 | 7.9 | 4.5 | 16.3 | 15.3 | | | 54.6 | 44.0 |
| 2002 | 83.8 | 887 | 6.7 | 37.7 | 5.4 | 11.2 | 12.9 | 12.9 | 10.3 | 2.9 | | 49.7 | 46.9 |
| 2006 | 84.3 | 875 | 4.7 | 37.8 | 5.6 | 10.3 | 6.2 | 9.7 | 20.1 | 3.3 | | 48.1 | 46.3 |
| 2010 | 87.7 | 936 | 4.6 | 36.9 | 5.7 | 7.9 | 5.8 | 7.3 | 25.2 | 5.7 | | 47.1 | 46.2 |
| 2014 | 89.2 | 944 | 3.8 | 34.6 | 5.3 | 8.3 | 3.6 | 5.5 | 19.3 | 17.7 | | 43.8 | 36.7 |
| 2018 | 89.3 | 943 | 4.6 | 29.7 | 3.5 | 11.5 | 3.8 | 7.4 | 16.4 | 21.7 | | 49.2 | 49.4 |

== Sports ==
The following sports clubs are located in Sköllersta:

- Sköllersta IF
