= Östansjö =

- Location within Örebro Location within Sweden
- Coordinates: 59°02′40″N 14°58′55″E
- Country: Sweden
- Province: Närke
- County: Örebro County
- Municipality: Hallsberg Municipality

Area
  - Total: 1.39 km^{2} (0.54 sq mi)

Population (31 December 2010)
  - Total: 868
  - Density: 623/km^{2} (1,610/sq mi)
- Time zone: UTC+1 (CET)
  - Summer (DST): UTC+2 (CEST)

Östansjö is a locality situated in Hallsberg Municipality, Örebro County, Sweden with 868 inhabitants in 2010.
