= Pålsboda =

- Location within Örebro Location within Sweden
- Coordinates: 59°04′N 15°20′E
- Country: Sweden
- Province: Närke
- County: Örebro County
- Municipality: Hallsberg Municipality
- First mentioned: 1549

Area
  - Total: 1.46 km^{2} (0.56 sq mi)

Population (31 December 2010)
  - Total: 1,552
  - Density: 1,060/km^{2} (2,700/sq mi)
- Time zone: UTC+1 (CET)
  - Summer (DST): UTC+2 (CEST)

Pålsboda is a locality situated in Hallsberg Municipality, Örebro County, Sweden with 1,552 inhabitants in 2010.

Pålsboda has one school, Folkasboskolan, one care centre, a couple of kindergartens, one ICA convenience store and two pizzerias. Pålsboda was also known for its Volkswagen museum, which contained a full collection of VW Type I Beetles from 1948 to 1975, until that was sold by auction in 2018. It has the only drawing pin factory in northern Europe, supplying almost all the Scandinavian countries. Pålsboda is also the home of the company Rolf Larsson Mek. AB which has created the whole production line for the "Bingolotto" lottery tickets.

== Riksdag elections ==
Year	%	Votes	V	S	MP	C	L	KD	M	SD	NyD	Left	Right
1973	94.2	1,326	2.7	43.4		30.8	9.8	3.9	9.4			46.1	49.9
1976	93.3	1,365	2.4	43.6		33.3	8.4	2.9	9.4			46.0	51.1
1979	92.6	1,400	2.1	46.8		27.1	9.0	3.4	11.4			48.9	47.6
1982	92.7	1,557	2.5	47.0	1.4	25.9	5.1	4.2	13.9			49.5	44.9
1985	90.0	1,515	2.3	49.3	1.3	23.4	11.9		11.6			51.6	46.9
1988	88.0	1,454	6.0	45.4	2.7	21.4	10.5	4.0	9.8			54.1	41.7
1991	86.5	1,461	4.2	42.8	1.4	16.3	8.0	8.1	12.3		6.3	47.0	44.7
1994	88.5	1,492	5.6	50.5	3.8	13.6	6.6	5.8	12.3		1.2	59.9	38.3
1998	82.8	1,351	12.1	43.2	3.2	10.0	3.6	12.6	13.5			58.5	39.7
2002	81.3	1,286	5.9	47.7	2.5	13.6	9.6	9.1	8.8	1.7		56.1	41.1
2006	83.0	1,251	4.2	44.8	2.1	14.0	4.9	6.2	16.1	5.4		51.0	41.1
2010	84.3	1,300	5.2	40.9	4.1	10.7	5.6	5.0	21.9	6.1		50.2	43.2
2014	85.6	1,344	4.0	40.9	3.9	9.7	2.5	5.2	15.5	16.4		48.9	32.8
2018	86.7	1,318	5.8	33.2	1.9	11.4	2.2	6.7	14.9	22.3		52.4	46.1
