= Geographical center of Sweden =

The geographical center of Sweden is contested amongst at least four locations.

== Flataklocken ==
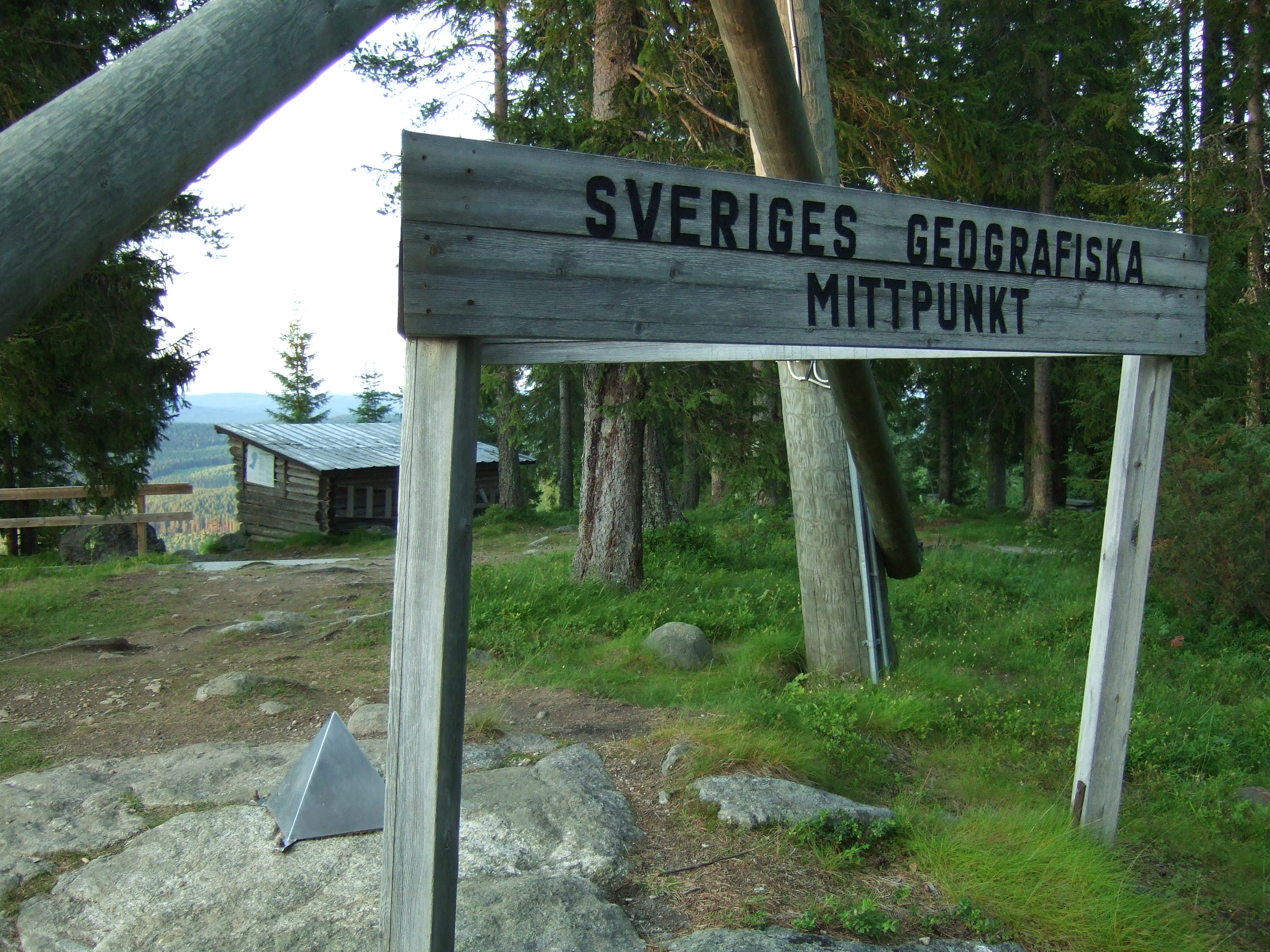
Sign denoting the geographical center of Sweden at Flataklocken in Medelpad

The oldest and most famous geographical center of Sweden is Flataklocken, a spot next to Lake Munkby in Torpshammar, Medelpad at 62°23′15″N 16°19′32″E. The site was identified in 1947 after an initiative by the newspaperman Gustaf von Platen. The method used for calculating this point was that of the centre of gravity of the geometrical figure of Sweden. The calculation was made by professor Nils Friberg and Tor Andeldorf at the geography department of Stockholm University, using a cardboard cutout map of Sweden with outlying islands attached directly to the mainland. They balanced the map model on a needle and declared the balancing point the geographical center.

A delegation including Gustaf von Platen, explorer Hans Ostelius and orienteer Gösta Lagerfelt trekked through the wilderness to the site and declared it the geographical center. Later, a sign marking the significance of the spot was erected and a lookout built. The site has since become a popular tourist attraction.

== Other claims ==
Area towns Ånge and Östersund often claim to be the geographical center of Sweden.

Other places have been claimed to be the centre of Sweden, using differing methods. The most prominent is Ytterhogdal in Hälsingland, based on the methodology of calculating the latitude for the point halfway between the northernmost (Treriksröset) and southernmost (southern tip of Skåne) points, and then taking the mid between the easternmost and westernmost points at that latitude.

== See also ==
- Geographical centres
- Demographical center of Sweden

== Sources ==
- Ånge Municipality Flataklocken Official Website (in English)
- Sveriges Mittpunkt - Flataklocken (in Swedish)
- Ytterhogdal vill bli Sveriges mittpunkt, Länstidningen 21 November 2005 (in Swedish)
