= Vretstorp =

- Locality
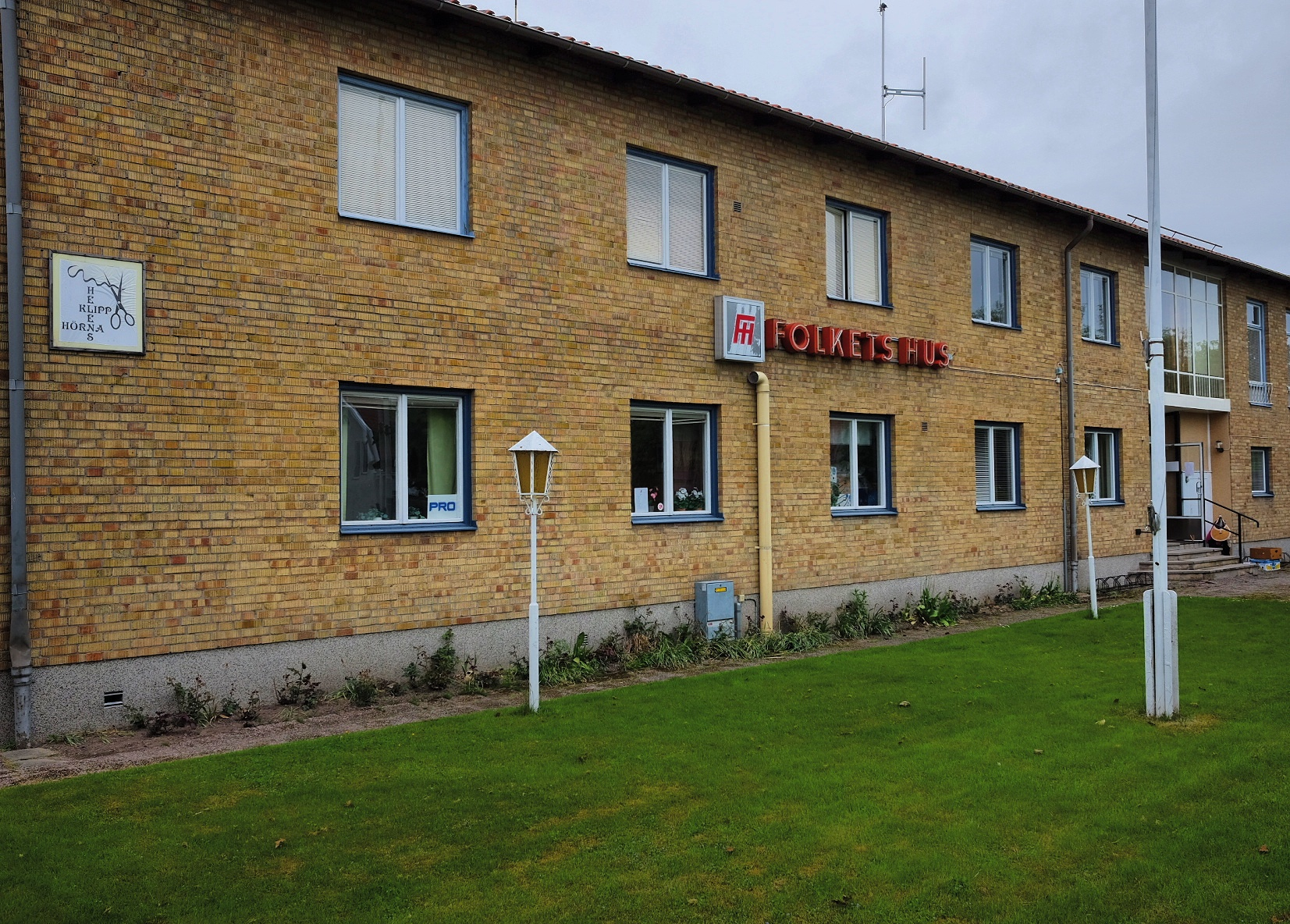
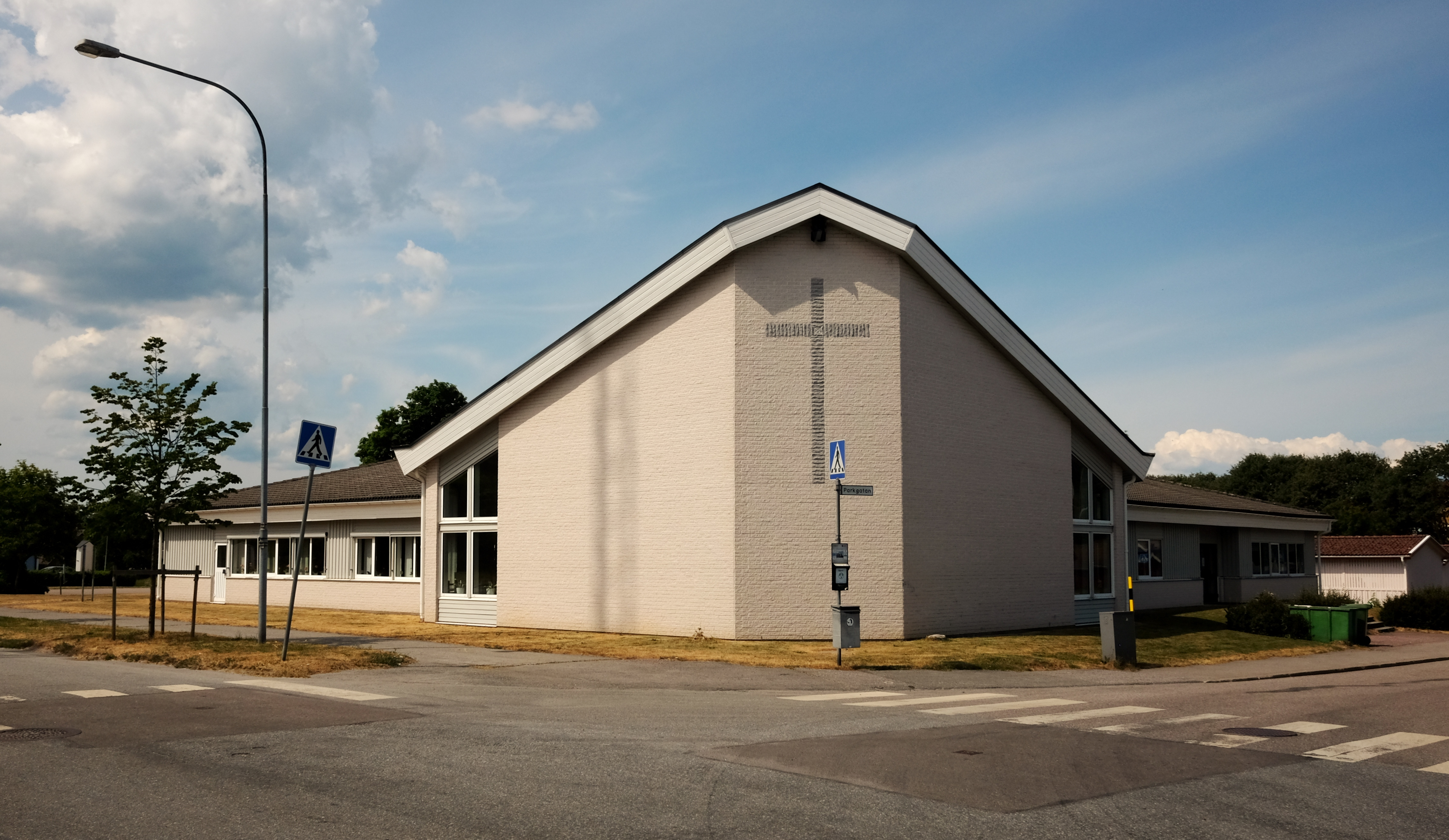
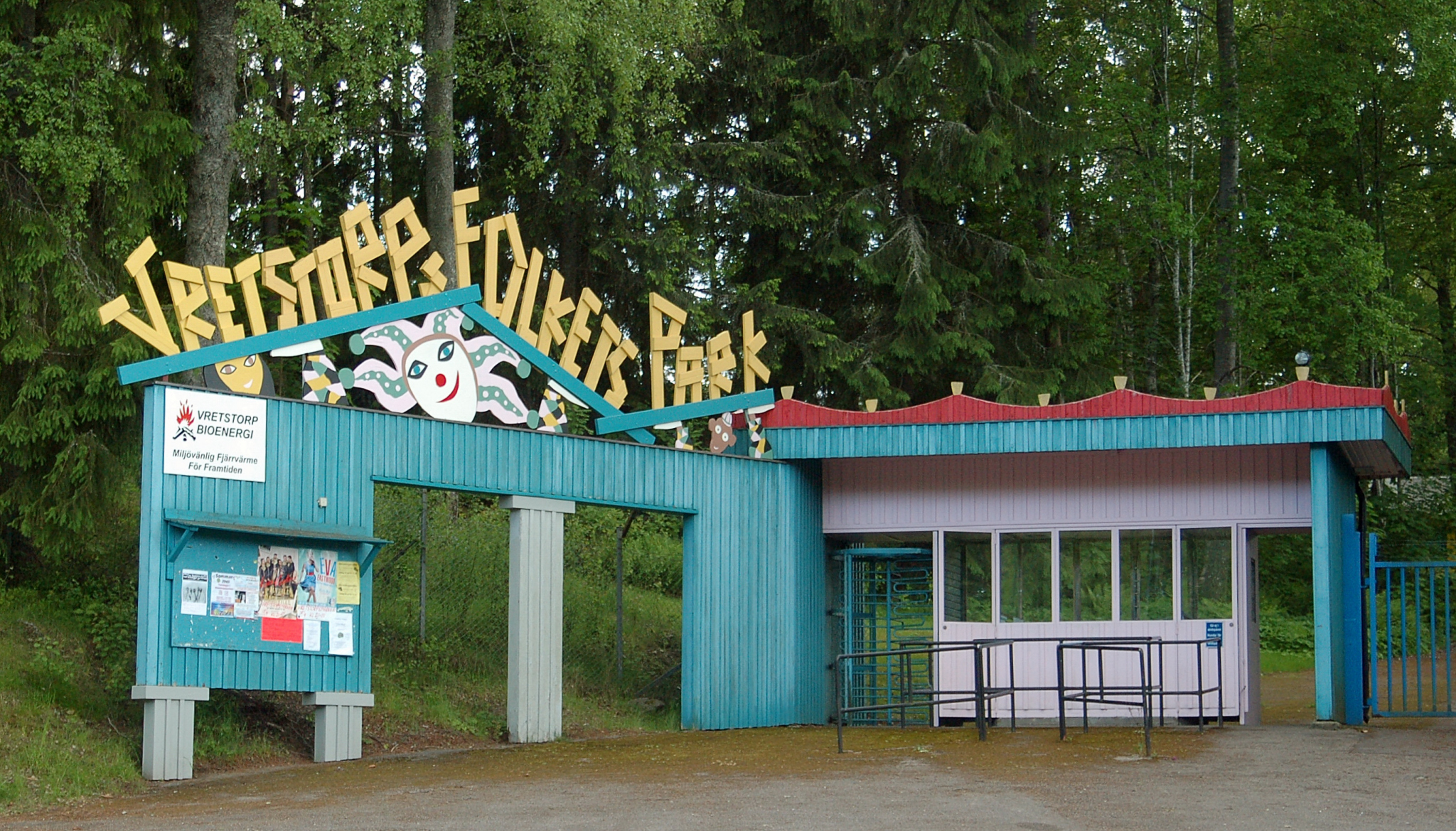
- People's House Crystal Church People's park

- Location within Örebro Location within Sweden
- Coordinates: 59°02′N 14°52′E
- Country: Sweden
- Province: Närke
- County: Örebro County
- Municipality: Hallsberg Municipality

Area
  - Total: 2.01 km^{2} (0.78 sq mi)

Population (2023)
  - Total: 941
  - Density: 467/km^{2} (1,210/sq mi)
- Time zone: UTC+1 (CET)
  - Summer (DST): UTC+2 (CEST)
- Postal code: 694 50–694 95

Vretstorp is a town in Sweden. It is located in Hallsbergs Kommun and Örebro län county, in the southern part of the country, 190 km west of the capital Stockholm. Vretstorp is located 65 meters above sea level, and has a population of 841.

The land around Vretstorp is mostly flat. Vretstorp is located in a valley.

The highest point in the area is 156 metres (511 ft) above sea level and is 2.1 km (1.3 mi) south of Vretstorp.

There are about 12 people per square kilometre ( 0.5 mi ) around Vretstorp and the area is sparsely populated. The nearest larger town is Hallsberg, 14.3 km (8 mi) east of Vretstorp. The area around Vretstorp is almost entirely covered in mixed forest.

In the region around Vretstorp, lakes are quite common.

== Climate ==
The average temperature is 4 °C. The warmest month is July, at 16 °C, and the coldest is February, at −8 °C.

== Demographics ==
Population development Vretstorp 1960-2020
| City | Population |
|---|---|
| 1960 | 1,010 |
| 1965 | 1,105 |
| 1970 | 1,035 |
| 1975 | 1,042 |
| 1980 | 1,060 |
| 1990 | 1,002 |
| 1995 | 956 |
| 2000 | 920 |
| 2005 | 841 |
| 2010 | 842 |
| 2015 | 852 |
| 2020 | 898 |

== Sources ==
- SCB (28 November 2024). "Folkmängd per tätort efter region och vart 5:e år". statistikdatabasen.scb.se (in Swedish).
