= Demographic center of Sweden =

The demographic center of a country is the point to which the cumulative distance the registered population would have to travel is the smallest, were they all to meet at a single location. As the population distribution of a country changes, the demographic center will move. In Sweden, Statistics Sweden (Statistiska Centralbyrån, or SCB) calculates the official demographic center, using a weighted mean population per property, by geographical coordinates.

The calculation of the actual location of the central point as carried out by Statistics Sweden in 2007 determined Hjortkvarn as the location of Sweden's demographic center. The same calculation done in 1989 had resulted in naming Svennevad the central point. Both places are in the municipality of Hallsberg, Örebro County. Over the 18 years between the calculations the center moved a few kilometres to the south, due to a decreasing population in northern Sweden and an increasing population in the south.

Year	Location	Municipality	County
1989	Svennevad	Hallsberg	Örebro County
2007	Hjortkvarn	Hallsberg	Örebro County

== See also ==
- Geographical center of Sweden
- Extreme points of Sweden

== Sources ==
- SCB Publication (in Swedish)
- Sweden's demographic centre, SCB.se, 2007-06-20 (in English)
