= Hallsberg Municipality =

Hallsberg Municipality Hallsbergs kommun
- Municipality
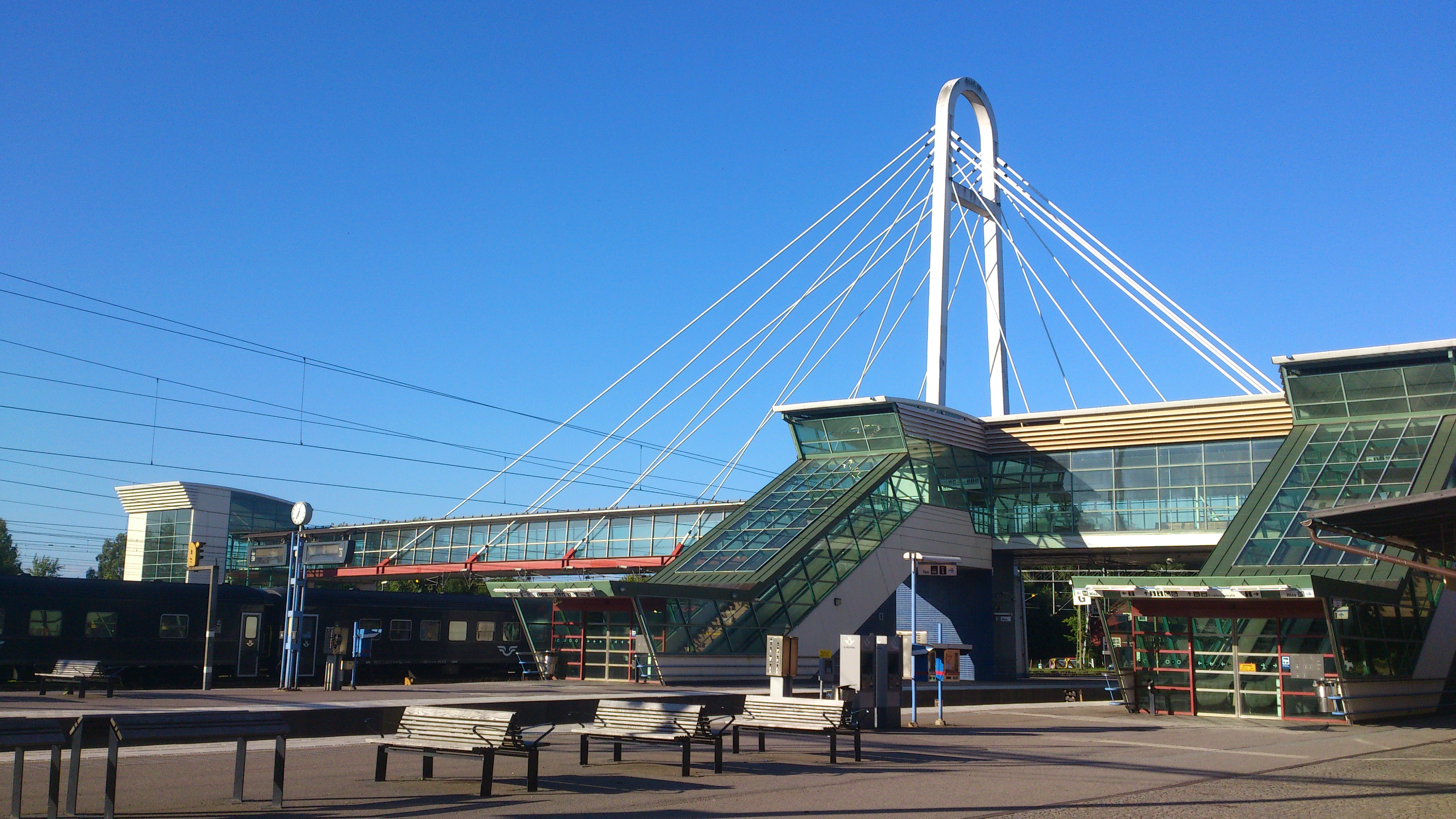
- Hallsberg Railway Station

- Coat of arms

- Coordinates: 59°04′N 15°07′E
- Country: Sweden
- County: Örebro County
- Seat: Hallsberg

Area
  - Total: 670.22 km^{2} (258.77 sq mi)
  - Land: 636.71 km^{2} (245.84 sq mi)
  - Water: 33.51 km^{2} (12.94 sq mi)
- Area as of 1 January 2014.

Population (30 June 2025)
  - Total: 16,097
  - Density: 25.282/km^{2} (65.479/sq mi)
- Time zone: UTC+1 (CET)
  - Summer (DST): UTC+2 (CEST)
- ISO 3166 code: SE
- Province: Närke
- Municipal code: 1861
- Website: www.hallsberg.se

Hallsberg Municipality (Swedish: Hallsbergs kommun) is a municipality in Örebro County in central Sweden. Its seat is located in the town of Hallsberg, which is the main railway hub for the central Swedish interior.

The present municipality was created in 1971 when the market town (köping) of Hallsberg was amalgamated with adjacent municipalities. A series of amalgamations had taken place in the area in 1952, 1963 and 1967.

== Localities ==
- Hallsberg (seat)
- Hjortkvarn
- Pålsboda
- Sköllersta
- Vretstorp
- Östansjö

== Demographics ==
This is a demographic table based on Hallsberg Municipality's electoral districts in the 2022 Swedish general election sourced from SVT's election platform, in turn taken from SCB official statistics.

In total there were 16,166 residents, including 11,930 Swedish citizens of voting age resident in the municipality. 49.3% voted for the left coalition and 49.4% for the right coalition. Indicators are in percentage points except population totals and income.

Location	Residents	Citizen adults	Left vote	Right vote	Employed	Swedish parents	Foreign heritage	Income SEK	Degree
Location			%	%					
Bo	432	346	44.0	54.9	68	86	14	20,828	21
Hässleberg	2,399	1,469	58.8	39.9	67	46	54	18,778	24
Kårstahult	1,251	960	51.2	47.4	83	76	24	26,543	27
Långängen	1,507	1,158	57.2	42.0	86	89	11	28,763	38
Pålsboda	2,133	1,562	46.1	52.3	78	79	21	23,289	25
Sköllersta	1,456	1,082	44.4	54.4	86	91	9	26,851	35
Svennevad	507	405	48.3	50.6	82	88	12	24,631	24
Vadsbron	1,938	1,568	49.3	49.9	80	86	14	23,742	28
Vingen	1,701	1,231	51.7	47.1	79	76	24	23,865	30
Vretstorp	1,614	1,197	40.9	57.5	83	92	8	24,442	22
Östansjö	1,228	952	43.9	54.3	85	90	10	26,665	27
Source: SVT

== Elections ==
These are the results of the elections in the municipality since the first election after the municipal reform, being held in 1973. The exact results of Sweden Democrats were not listed at a municipal level by SCB from 1988 to 1998 due to the party's small size at the time. "Turnout" denotes the percentage of eligible people casting any ballots, whereas "Votes" denotes the number of valid votes only.

=== Riksdag ===
Year	Turnout	Votes	V	S	MP	C	L	KD	M	SD	ND
1973	91.5	10,751	3.6	51.3	0.0	26.4	8.8	2.3	7.1	0.0	0.0
1976	92.7	11,329	3.4	49.6	0.0	28.1	9.1	1.9	7.8	0.0	0.0
1979	91.7	11,384	4.5	51.0	0.0	21.8	9.4	2.4	10.5	0.0	0.0
1982	92.3	11,539	4.8	54.3	1.1	17.4	5.5	3.5	13.5	0.0	0.0
1985	91.1	11,308	4.6	54.5	1.3	16.1	11.0	0.0	12.0	0.0	0.0
1988	87.7	10,778	6.5	53.0	4.0	13.7	9.5	3.3	9.6	0.0	0.0
1991	87.2	10,796	5.5	47.1	2.1	10.4	7.3	8.3	11.7	0.0	7.0
1994	88.4	10,820	7.1	55.3	3.9	8.6	5.9	5.1	12.3	0.0	1.0
1998	83.0	9,862	13.9	46.3	4.0	6.5	3.4	10.5	13.4	0.0	0.0
2002	82.3	9,635	8.3	50.4	3.4	8.3	8.6	8.7	8.4	2.3	0.0
2006	84.0	9,568	6.0	49.1	3.5	8.8	4.9	6.6	14.7	4.6	0.0
2010	86.2	9,955	5.9	44.8	4.9	6.3	4.8	5.3	20.7	6.7	0.0
2014	88.3	10,280	5.1	43.6	4.4	6.2	2.9	4.3	14.6	16.7	0.0

Blocs

This lists the relative strength of the socialist and centre-right blocs since 1973, but parties not elected to the Riksdag are inserted as "other", including the Sweden Democrats results from 1988 to 2006, but also the Christian Democrats pre-1991 and the Greens in 1982, 1985 and 1991. The sources are identical to the table above. The coalition or government mandate marked in bold formed the government after the election. New Democracy got elected in 1991 but are still listed as "other" due to the short lifespan of the party.

Year	Turnout	Votes	Left	Right	SD	Other	Elected
1973	91.5	10,751	**54.9**	42.3	0.0	2.8	97.2
1976	92.7	11,329	53.0	**45.9**	0.0	2.0	98.0
1979	91.7	11,384	55.5	**41.7**	0.0	2.8	97.2
1982	92.3	11,539	**59.1**	36.4	0.0	4.5	95.5
1985	91.1	11,308	**59.1**	39.1	0.0	1.8	98.2
1988	87.7	10,778	**63.5**	32.8	0.0	3.7	96.3
1991	87.2	10,796	52.6	**37.7**	0.0	9.7	97.3
1994	88.4	10,820	**66.3**	31.9	0.0	1.8	98.2
1998	83.0	9,862	**64.2**	33.8	0.0	2.0	98.0
2002	82.3	9,635	**62.1**	34.0	0.0	3.9	96.1
2006	84.0	9,568	58.6	**35.0**	0.0	6.4	93.6
2010	86.2	9,955	55.6	**37.1**	6.7	0.6	99.4
2014	88.3	10,280	**53.1**	28.0	16.7	2.2	97.8

== Twin towns ==
Hallsberg's three twin towns with the year of its establishing:

- Toijala, Finland (since 1946)
- Valga, Estonia (since 1991)
- Gifhorn, Germany (since 1996)
