= Lelång =

Lake in Sweden

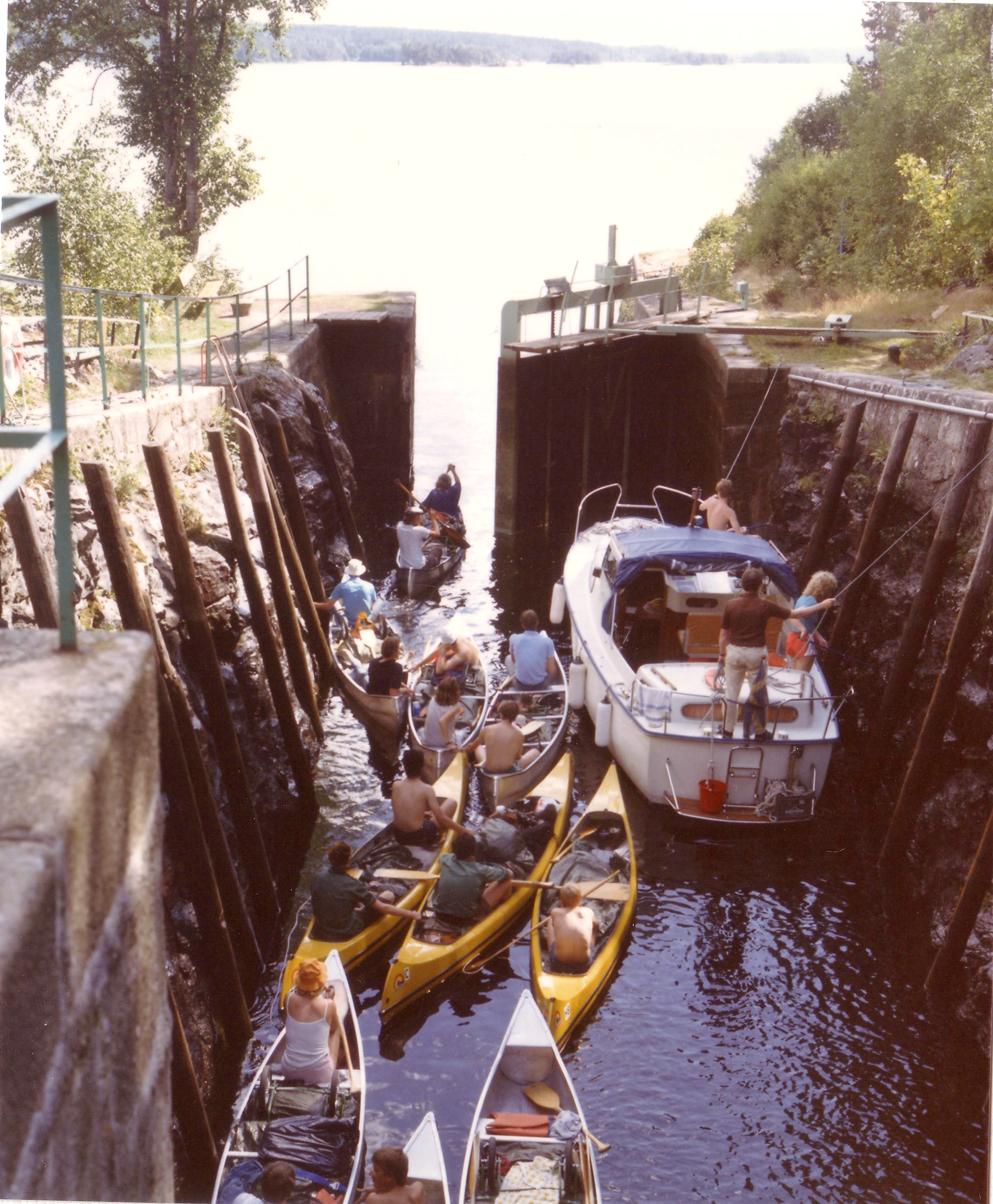
- Canoeists paddle onto Lake Lelång, 1991

- Location within Sweden
- Coordinates: 59°09′30″N 12°06′30″E
- Basin countries: Sweden
- Max. length: 39.1 km (24.3 mi)
- Max. width: 2.4 km (1.5 mi)
- Average depth: approx. 60 m (200 ft)
- Surface elevation: 93 m (305 ft)
- Islands: Grisholmen, Vikholmarna, Sörvikerholmarna, Slomholmarna, Bråtnäsön, Holmen, Bergholmen, Rebbingen, Taraldsön, Gummenäsön, Hallön, Sätön, Storön, Degenesöarna, Dalholmarna, Kärleksön, Greaön, Äspenäsön, Berganeön
- Settlements: Bengtsfors, Lennartsfors

Lelång Lake is a Swedish lake. It lies on the border between Bengtsfors municipality, in the province of Dalsland, and Årjäng municipality, in the province of Värmland.

The lake has an elongated shape and stretches approximately 40 km (25 mi) from Lennartsfors in the north to Bengtsfors in the south. The lake can be reached by three sets of locks. The lock located at Lennartsfors connects it to Lake Foxen, that at Gustavsfors to Lake Västra Silen and the one at Bengtsfors to Lake Bengtsbrohöljen. In addition to this the lake stands in open connection to Lake Ärtingen 5 km north of Bengtsfors. Lake Lelång forms part of Dalsland Canal.

The lake contains numerous species of fish, such as perch, pike, Salvelinuschar, salmon trout, burbot, atlantic salmon, bream, eel and minnow.

A canoeing competition named Dalsland Kanotmaraton + is staged every year on Lake Lelång and other lakes in the vicinity.
