= Gustavsfors =

Swedish village on the border of Dalsland and Värmland province

Coordinates: 59.19118°N 12.10924°E

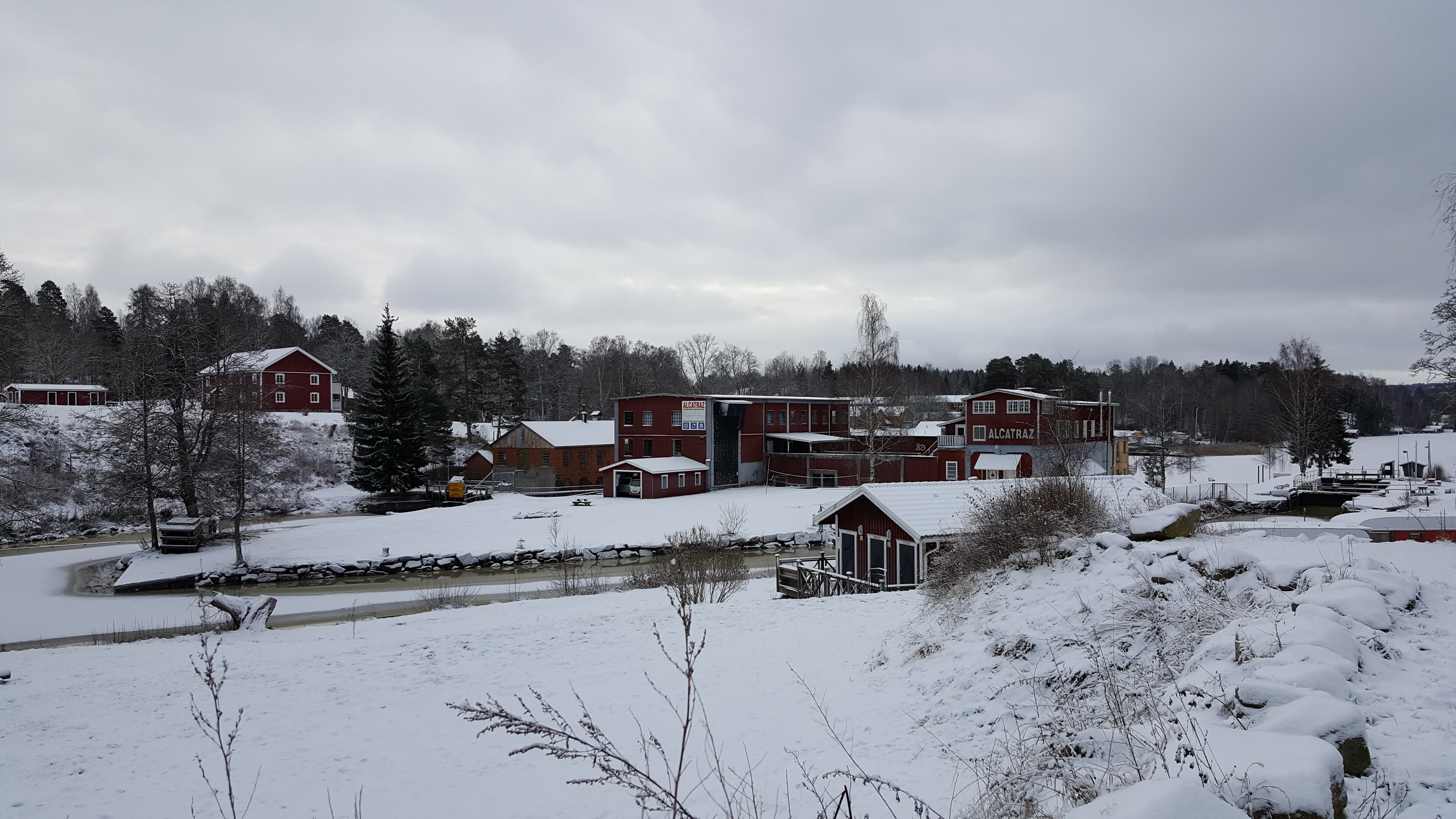
Gustavsfors during winter

Gustavsfors is a small Swedish village located next to Dalsland Canal on the border between the provinces Dalsland and Värmland along county road 172. The main part of the village is located in Torrskogs district in Bengtsfors Municipality, Västra Götaland County. Smaller parts of the village is located in Blomskogs district in Årjäng Municipality, Värmland County and in Vårviks district.

== Economy ==
Past Gustavsfors passes the closed Dal-Västra Värmlands railway which is being used by train traffic between Årjäng and Bengtsfors.

Gustavsfors bruk has been there since the 1740s. There is also Gustavsfors Chapel, a hostel called Alcatraz which was built in an old warehouse by the canal between the lakes Lelången and Västra Silen

There are some summertime cafes and restaurants, canoe rental and a general store.

== History ==
Gustavsfors is a society that struggled for its survival during the 1900s. The village was built around its iron and paper industry, but now it has changed to maintain itself through tourism during the summer.

Gustavsfors Bruk is an industry founded 1747 by the brothers Nils and Jöns Koch. Gustavsfors, together with Billingsfors and Bäckefors Bruk conducted steel manufacturing during the 1700s.

== Tourist attractions ==
Alcatraz is a hostel located between the lakes Lelången and Västra silen. There is one activity center where you can rent canoes, bikes and pedalos, you can also go hiking and quad racing. They will serve you coffee and lunches.

There is a millstone in Gustavsfors that was built 1924 in memory of ''Räls-Kalle'' (Rail-Kalle). When the railway was being built, Karl Johnsson, alias Räls-Kalle, lifted, in the sight of 98 witnesses, this millstone that weighs 1327 kg.

Bengtsfors Municipality has been a popular place to record movies since 2000. In Gustavsfors for example, the Danish-Swedish film Midsommer by Carsten Myllerup was filmed in the year 2000.
