= Laxarby IF =

Swedish football club

- Full name: Laxarby IF
- Founded: 1931; 95 years ago
- Ground: Bengtsfors
Home colours

Laxarby IF is a Swedish football club located in Bengtsfors. It was founded in 1931.
