= Bengtsfors Church =

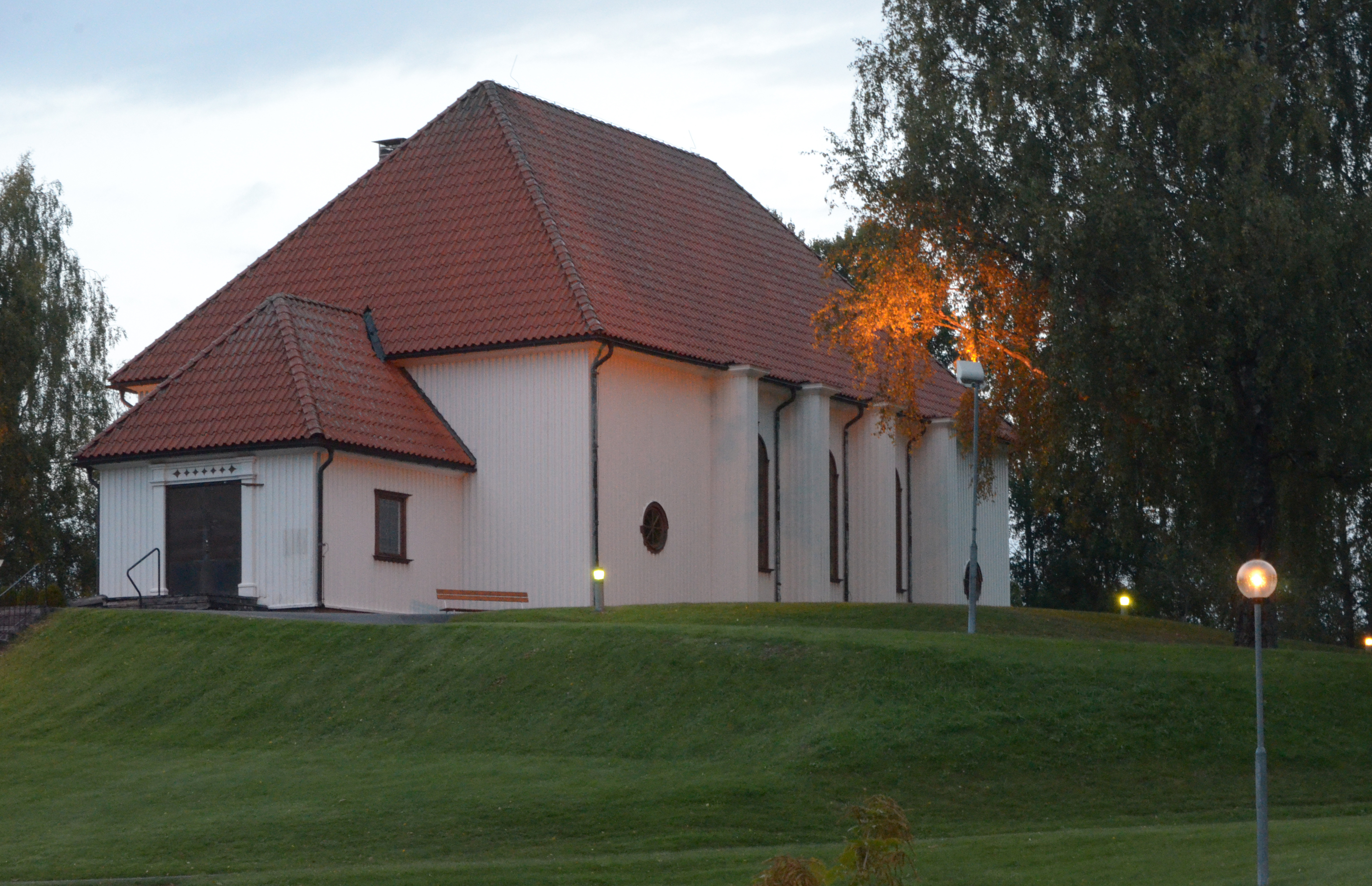
- Bengtsfors Church in September 2012

- Location of Bengtsfors Church in Västra Götaland County
- 59°1′58.5″N 12°13′50.3″E
- Location: Bengtsfors, Västra Götaland County
- Country: Sweden
- Denomination: Church of Sweden
- Website: Ärtemarks parish

History
- Consecrated: 1926

Bengtsfors Church (Swedish: Bengtsfors kyrka) belongs to the Ärtemark parish in the Diocese of Karlstad, Sweden. It is situated on a point in the Lelång Lake in the municipality of Bengtsfors.

== History and architecture ==
The wooden church was built in 1926, designed by engineer Simon Svensson and was consecrated the same year by bishop Johan Alfred Eklund. A larger renovation and conversion was made in 1957 under the supervision of architect Verner Johansson. That was when the church porch was added and the sacristy extended. The style of the church is a typical 1920s Classicism.

A separate bell tower was built in 1933.

== Furnishings ==
The inventories in the church are:

- The pulpit is contemporary with the church. At the renovation in 1957, wooden sculptures depicting Jesus and the Four Evangelists were added to it.
- The baptismal font is made of wood with a brass bowl placed in it. The font was a gift from the Bengtsfors Fraternity Society.
- There are two organs in the church: one in the organ loft and one in the choir.
- The altarpiece is an oil painting made in 1957, by artist Henkelman from Stockholm. The painting depicts the words of Jesus in the Sermon on the Mount: "You are the light of the world. A town built on a hill cannot be hidden." (Matthew 5:14)
