= Bäcke Church =

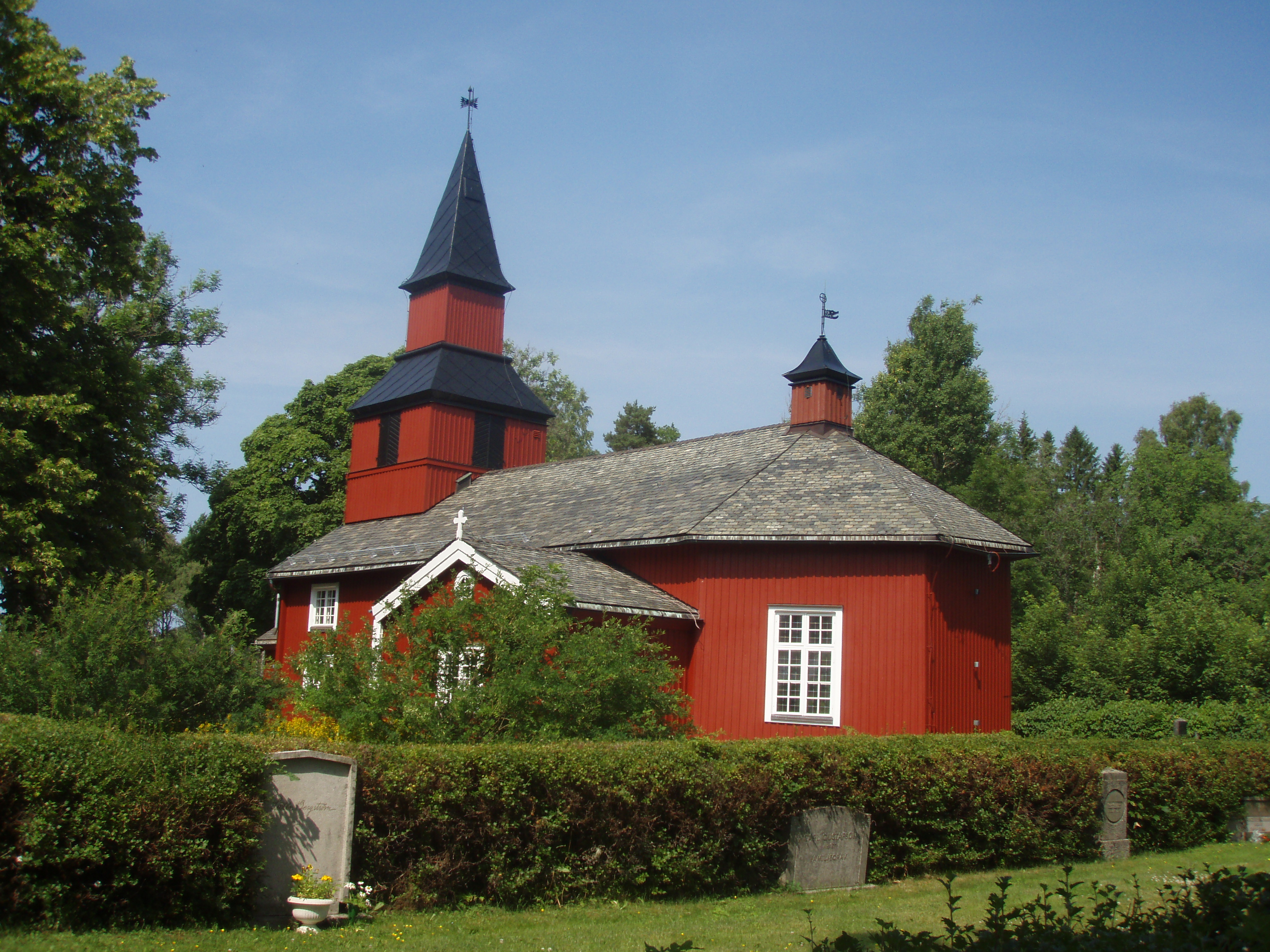
- Bäcke Church in 2010.

- Location of Tisselskog Church in Västra Götaland County
- 58°47′41.22″N 12°9′52.2″E
- Location: Bengtsfors Municipality, Västra Götaland County
- Country: Sweden
- Denomination: Church of Sweden
- Website: Bäcke Church

History
- Consecrated: 1653

Bäcke Church (Swedish: Bäcke kyrka) in the Bengtsfors Municipality belongs to the Bäcke-Ödskölts parish in the Diocese of Karlstad, Sweden.

== History ==
The wooden church of Bäcke was built in 1650–1653. The west part of the building was extended in 1797. In 1892, a sacristy and a church porch were added. The church has a framework of made of logs and consists of a nave and a three-sided choir facing the east. The church porch is on the west side of the nave and the church tower is placed on top of the west part of the nave's roof. The sacristy is in the southwest part of the church. The exterior walls are covered with wood panelling painted red. The nave, church porch and sacristy have pitched roofs covered with slate.

== Furnishings ==
There is a soapstone baptismal font from the later part of the 13th century in the south part of the choir. The organ is made by Magnussons Orgelbyggeri AB in 1974–1975.
