= Silbodals kyrka =

Church in Årjäng, Sweden

Coordinates: 59.385928°N 12.124142°E

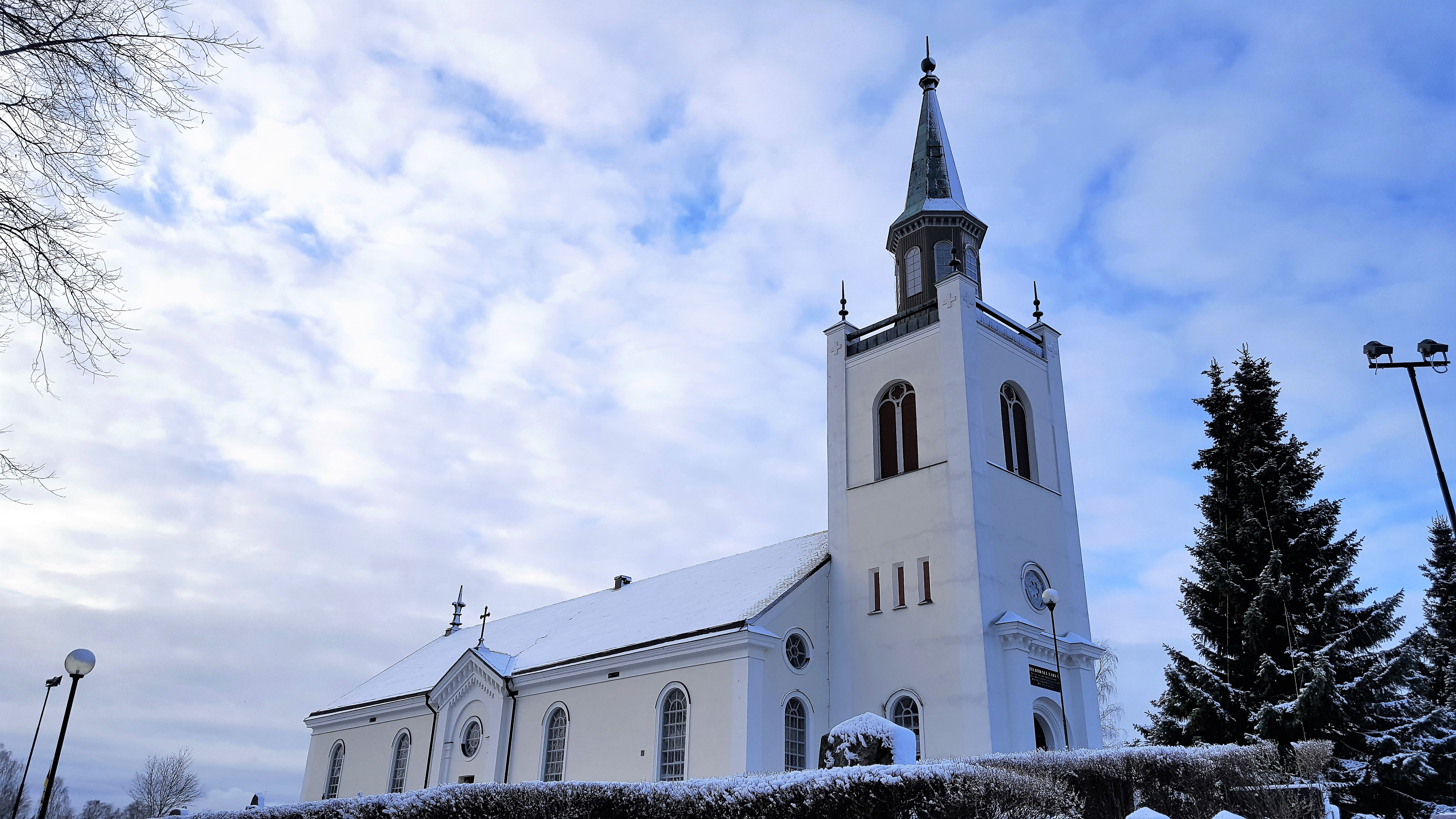
The church of Silbodal

Silbodals kyrka is a church situated in Årjäng. It was built 1856-1859, the architect C G Blom Carlsson made the drawings of the church which is built in a typical neoclassical style. It was consecrated in 1859 by bishop Johan Anton Millén.

The Church of Silbodal is located untraditionally in the north south direction, it consists of a rectangular building with a narrower, three-sided chancel in the south, as well as a tower in the north. The church is externally well-preserved.

== History ==
Before this newer church was built there was an old wooden church with a cruciformed plan located at the north end of the lake Västra Silen.

This wooden church was built in 1665 and was torn down in 1859 due to its bad condition.

The construction of the new church of Silbodal came to cost approximately 19 659 sek, it was financed by a levy and partly by using volunteers.

The assembly at this time was approximately 2350 people.

== Inventories ==
- The holy water font made in soapstone was carved in the Middle Ages. It is placed at the west side by the chancel.
- The pulpit is made by carpenter Per Olsson in Årjäng in 1859. It is painted in a light gray colour and consists of a hexagonal basket, decorated with the symbols of "Faith, Hope and Love". It has an overhanging canopy.
- 15 angels made of glass were made and donated by the artist Ingalena Klenell from Sunne in 1998-1999.
- In the rear of the church hangs a wooden chandelier and two wooden boards which have two angels painted on them. These inventories are relics from the old wooden church.
- The coffin in the church porch is dated 1698.

== Restorations ==
The first major restoration inside the church was done in 1940-1941. A new heating system was installed and a morgue cellar was built under the chancel. There was also built a coat check below the organ loft, a meeting room and a sacristy. The windowpanes were changed to lead-in antique glass windows. The chancel was decorated with the sculpture "The good shepherd" and two wooden reliefs, "Baptism" and "The First Communion" made by Gunnar Torhamn.

The facade was renovated in 1995.

The second major restoration inside the church was in 1998-1999. The interior was painted in a new colour scheme, white and gold to recreate the original version of the church.

The pews and the platform pillars were repainted.

The old chancel decoration which was removed in 1940 was placed at the east nave. The portal from the old wooden church is now placed around the door which leads to the sacristy.
