= Borgåsgubben =

Statue in Sweden

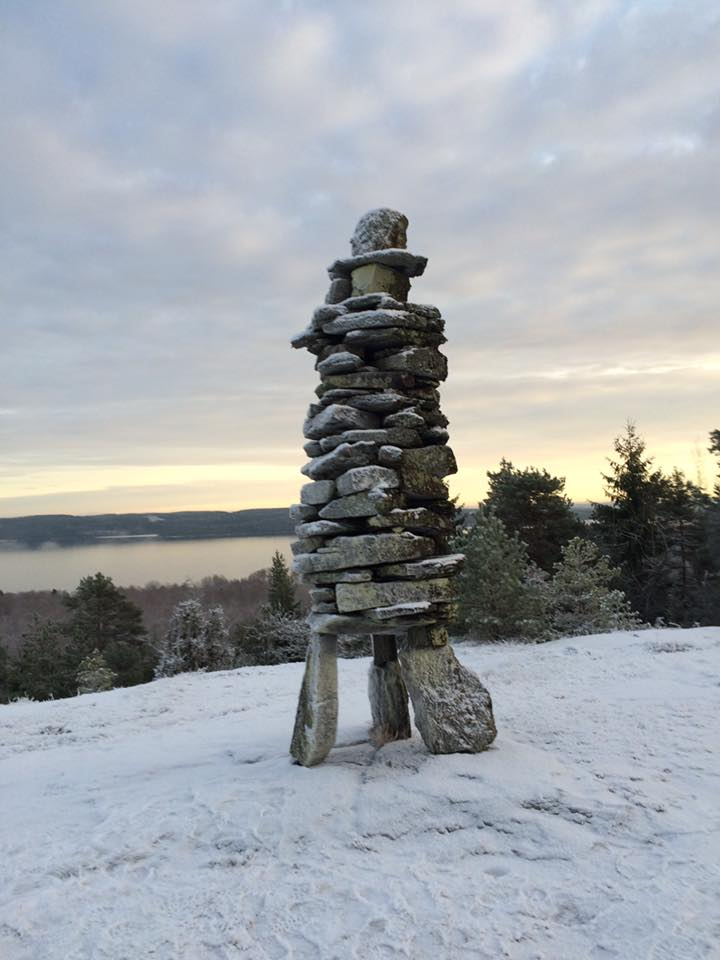
photo: Ingmar Nilsson

Borgåsgubben is a 10-foot-tall male figure statue made of different sizes of stone-bricks put together. He stands on top of a mountain called Borgåsen, in Källtegen, Blomskog, Årjäng, Sweden. Why he was put there is unknown, but rumor has it that he was put there to frighten off enemies. It was supposed to give those attacking a vision of a living guard post. It was built in times of war between Sweden and Norway in the seventeenth century. Many believe that the stone statue was made by soldiers called caroleans, soldiers that served in the army under the Swedish King Charles XII's rule. Charles and his soldiers were passing by and were on their way to Fredriksten fortress in Norway when they stopped in Blomskog.

To celebrate the millennium, the people of Blomskog made a new memorial and gave Borgåsgubben a 3.5-foot-tall wife; she is located on another hill, called "Källte kuel" a mile away. She is called Stenfrun - The Stonelady. Later on some unknown tourist gave them a son; there is no name and no date of when he was built. You can find him next to the Stonelady.

== History of Borgåsen ==
The area around Blomskog, and the whole of Värmland has a lot of history. In the 16th-century it was very poor, and a war-feud between Sweden and Norway (under Danish rule) led to the border towns on the Swedish side being burned down several times. There is a book by Olle Högstrand printed in 1979 called "När hela socknen brann" which describes how society looked then when the statue was made. During the ensuing years people have used the hill as an escape allowing refugees to feel safe and protected.

=== Ancient castle ===
Borgåsgubben stands in the middle of an ancient castle that measures 110*55 meters. But the only thing still remaining is a 50 meter long low stone wall on the mountain's southern slope, where the entrance is. The steep mountain sides have served as a natural protection.

It is considered that most ancient castles were built during the early Iron Age (400 - 1050 AD). In times of sacrifices places like this have been used by refugees. People also used it to guard roads and sea transports. Another possibility is that they may have served as permanent residences.

It has an ancestral number 39: 1 in Blomskog Latitude: 59.2884 degrees north, longitude: 12.0852 degrees east (WGS84). List of others ancient castle ruins in Värlmand.

=== Charles XII ===
The area of Årjäng has since ancient times been important, here lies one of the country's main roads across the border to Norway. The significance was particularly prominent during Karl XII's time, which left many trails in the country. Rumor has it that it was Charles XII caroleans who built Borgåsgubben.

=== WW2 ===
During World War II there was a watchtower located on the mountain. The post was guarded around the clock and on the lookout for attacks from German aircraft. While standing in that tower looking at the forest west of Lennartsfors one is able to see Norway. On Källtegen's mountain you can find two wheeled crosses engraved, they were made by guards who were stationed there.

== Nowadays ==
Nowadays you could say that Borgåsgubben is the hallmark for the people of Blomskog. For a part of the local population, the old man is more meaningful for others. If you have your roots here, the story of the mountain, the castle and the stone statue is part of their legacy. Tourist visit the figure Borgåsgubben, not just because of him, but for the incredibly beautiful nature around him. On the hilltop you have a great view of Lake Västra Silen.

What we know about the mountain and its history is just the tip of the iceberg. Locals residents have found names engraved from both soldiers and people who used to live in the neighborhood. It's expected that more could be found.

== How to get there ==
Directions from Årjäng: Drive road 172 towards Bengtsfors about 12 km, turn right at the sign Blomskog. Continue about 2.5 km. The figure is visible a long way before reaching the height where a ladder rises to the left. There is a small parking lot here at the beginning of the mountain slope. You can park your car here and then you have to walk by foot to reach Borgåsgubben.

Map: 59° 17′ 19.2″ N, 12° 05′ 07.2″ E

== See also ==
- Lill-Ingmars
