= Stora Le =

Lake in Sweden

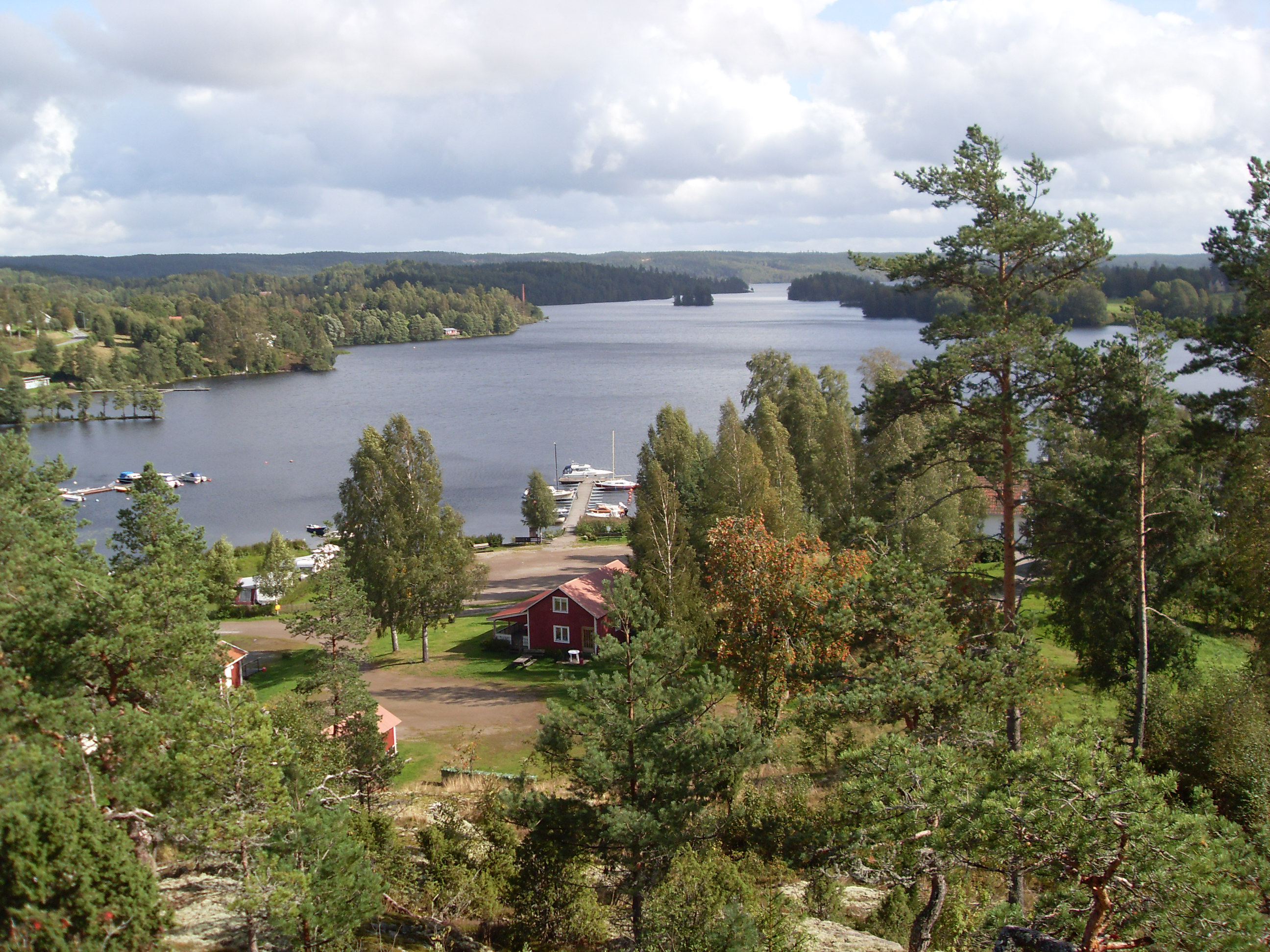
- View into the long bay of Nössemark

- Location within Västra Götaland Location within Sweden Location within Norway
- Coordinates: 59°09′42″N 11°52′45″E
- Basin countries: Sweden, Norway
- Max. length: 66 km (41 mi)
- Max. width: 5.2 km (3.2 mi)
- Surface area: 131 km^{2} (51 sq mi)
- Average depth: approx. 99 m (325 ft)
- Surface elevation: 102.1 m (335 ft)
- Islands: Stenbyön, Lövön, Kalvön, Uprannsön, Bärön, Östra Långön, Västra Långön, Getön, Getöarna, Kollön, Tullön, Hälsön, Hästön, Bryntorpsön, Trollön/Trolløya, Koløya, Lauvöya, Bøensøya, Mosvikøya Grunnerudön, Sandvikeön, Guppviksön, Björnön, Strandön, Ängön, Rågön, Grindalsön, Leksön, Bortön, Matön, Furustadön, Naversöarna, Bokön, Skottön
- Settlements: Töcksfors, Ed, Nössemark

Stora Le or Lesjön in Swedish and Store Le in Norwegian is a lake in Dalsland, Sweden, the northern end of which proceeds into Norway and into Värmland, where it continues as Lake Foxen.

The lake stretches approximately 70 km (43.5 Mi) from Ed in the south past Nössemark to Töcksfors in the north, on Lake Foxen. It is a narrow lake, rarely measuring more than 2 to 3 km (1.2 to 1.9 mi) across, apart from a stretch forming part of Lake Foxen, where it reaches a full 5 km (3.1 mi). Stora Le and Lake Foxen combined cover 131 km^{2} (51 sq mi). This makes Stora Le the 19th largest lake in Sweden. Its greatest depth is 99 metres (325 ft) to the south of Västra Fågelvik in the Lake Foxen part.

The lake system's level has been controlled since 1945 when the level was raised by 6 dm (2 ft) to 102.1 m (335 ft) above sea level. Lake levels are allowed to vary within a 1 metre (3 ft 3 in) bandwidth. The maximum allowed outtake of water is 80 cubic metres (2,800 cu ft) per second. The lake is reachable by boat through the Dalsland Canal. The lake's shores are mountainous and the forest nearly grows down to the water line. Dalsland's provincial fish the fourhorn sculpin is also found in Stora Le.

The islet of Trollön (Troll's island, Trolløya in Norwegian) is situated on the Norway–Sweden border, which divides the island in two.
