= Årjäng =

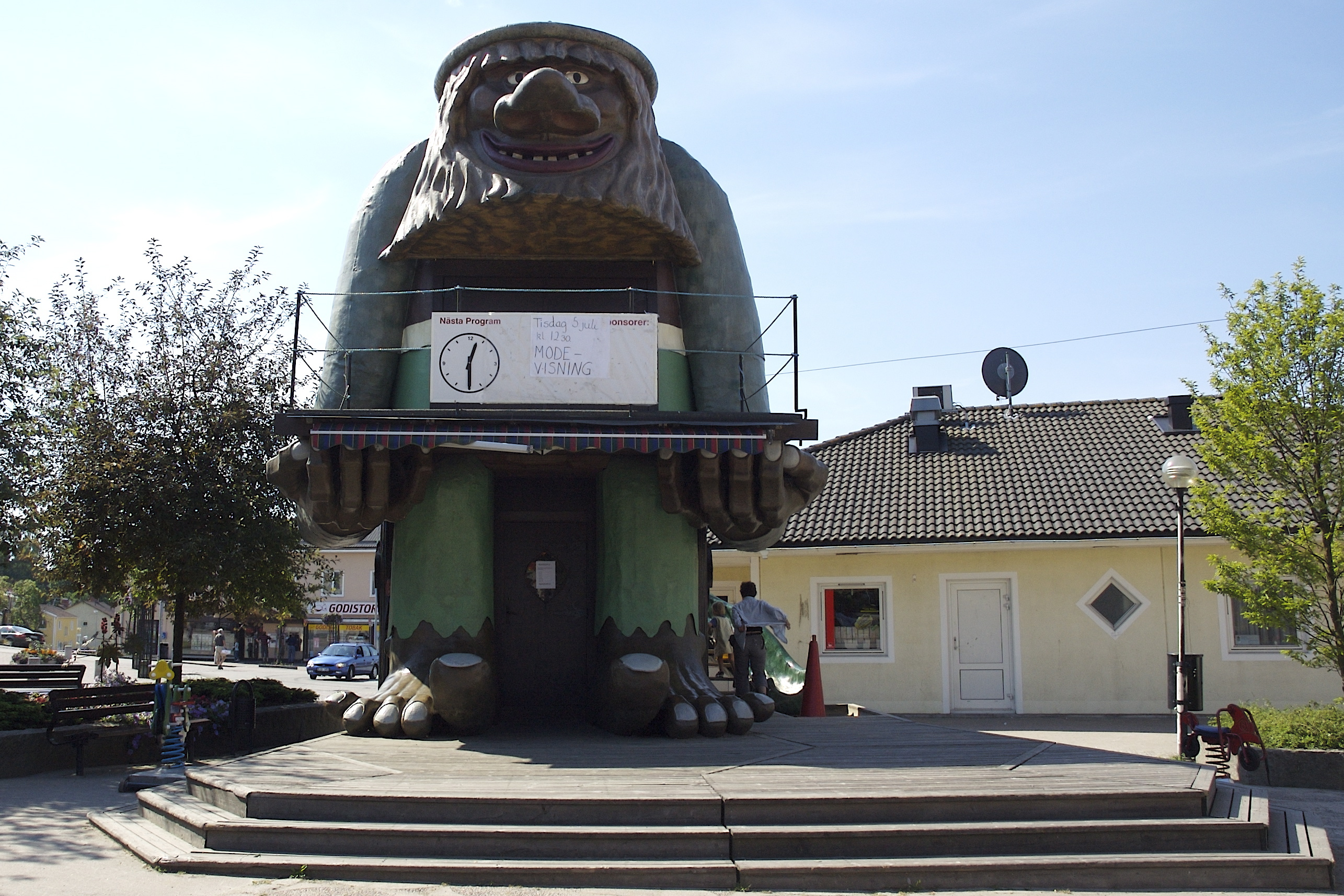
- The Årjängstrollet statue in Årjäng

- Coat of arms

- Location within Sweden
- Coordinates: 59°23′N 12°08′E
- Country: Sweden
- Province: Värmland
- County: Värmland County
- Municipality: Årjäng Municipality

Area
  - Total: 4.10 km^{2} (1.58 sq mi)

Population (31 December 2010)
  - Total: 3,228
  - Density: 787/km^{2} (2,040/sq mi)
- Time zone: UTC+1 (CET)
  - Summer (DST): UTC+2 (CEST)

Årjäng is a locality and the seat of Årjäng Municipality, Värmland County, Sweden with 3,228 inhabitants in 2010. It is located around 30 kilometres (19 mi) from the Norway-Sweden border and on the road between Karlstad and Oslo. In 1540 Årjäng was spelled Argenge. This word has an Old Swedish genitive case of å, meaning river, which refers to the Silbodal river. The morpheme genge refers to a crossing over the river.

== History ==
=== Antiquity ===
Ancient findings show that Årjäng Municipality has been inhabited for a very long time. Ceramics, burnt animal bones and flint objects have been found nearby, dating back to 3500-3000 B.C.

=== Medieval ===
In the 11th century the domains regarding what is now part of Årjäng Municipality was called Nordmarken. The belief of natural beings like giants, trolls, scrubbers and elves was rooted in the inhabitants of this time period. Around the 12th century Christianity slowly took hold among the people, and churches were soon built.

== Climate ==
The border region surrounding Årjäng has a borderline oceanic/continental climate in recent decades, although in previous decades such as the 1961-1990 it was even cold enough to be classified as mild subarctic. The nearest weather station is in Blomskog, located within the woods at a similar altitude somewhat farther south.

== Tourist attractions ==
Årjängstrollet located downtown was created by artist Erik Hermansson, the creation of the troll was inspired by Thore Skogman's fairytale about trolls in Årjäng.

A "sculpture walk" can be experienced from Årjäng central to Kyrkerud art school; a walk for experience and recreation.

Horse trot racing is an established sport in Årjäng, it is the highlight every year to hold the race "V75" at Årjängstravet.

Båstnäs Car Cemetery has become a cultural meeting point for artists and photographers; a monument to an earlier era of automotive history.

== Famous people from Årjäng ==
- Anders Lindbäck, priest and serial killer, active in Årjäng (Silbodal).
- Victor Sjöström, famous director and actor.
- Per-Gunnar Anderson, professional rally driver.

== See also ==
- Gustavsfors
- Glaskogen
- Årjängstravet
- Silbodals kyrka
- Borgåsgubben

== Churches ==
Årjäng is part of Silbodal parish. The Silbodal church is found in the southern parts of the village.

Climate data for Blomskog (20 km south of Årjäng) (2002-2015 temp averages, 1964-1990 precipitation, extremes since 1964)
Month	Jan	Feb	Mar	Apr	May	Jun	Jul	Aug	Sep	Oct	Nov	Dec	Year
Record high °C (°F)	10.0 (50.0)	12.7 (54.9)	20.0 (68.0)	26.6 (79.9)	28.6 (83.5)	31.1 (88.0)	32.7 (90.9)	32.9 (91.2)	25.6 (78.1)	20.0 (68.0)	13.8 (56.8)	10.0 (50.0)	32.9 (91.2)
Mean daily maximum °C (°F)	0.0 (32.0)	0.4 (32.7)	4.7 (40.5)	10.8 (51.4)	15.3 (59.5)	19.2 (66.6)	21.5 (70.7)	20.2 (68.4)	15.9 (60.6)	9.5 (49.1)	4.8 (40.6)	0.9 (33.6)	10.2 (50.4)
Daily mean °C (°F)	−2.7 (27.1)	−2.6 (27.3)	0.4 (32.7)	5.5 (41.9)	10.0 (50.0)	13.7 (56.7)	16.5 (61.7)	15.5 (59.9)	11.9 (53.4)	6.1 (43.0)	2.2 (36.0)	−1.8 (28.8)	6.2 (43.2)
Mean daily minimum °C (°F)	−5.3 (22.5)	−5.7 (21.7)	−3.8 (25.2)	0.2 (32.4)	4.7 (40.5)	8.3 (46.9)	11.5 (52.7)	10.8 (51.4)	6.9 (44.4)	2.7 (36.9)	−0.3 (31.5)	−4.6 (23.7)	2.1 (35.8)
Record low °C (°F)	−32.4 (−26.3)	−36.5 (−33.7)	−27.0 (−16.6)	−15.3 (4.5)	−5.6 (21.9)	−2.7 (27.1)	0.9 (33.6)	−2.0 (28.4)	−6.8 (19.8)	−14.2 (6.4)	−25.4 (−13.7)	−30.3 (−22.5)	−36.5 (−33.7)
Average precipitation mm (inches)	52.2 (2.06)	37.1 (1.46)	41.4 (1.63)	38.1 (1.50)	42.6 (1.68)	55.9 (2.20)	59.3 (2.33)	70.1 (2.76)	76.3 (3.00)	78.8 (3.10)	72.4 (2.85)	52.1 (2.05)	676.5 (26.63)
Source 1: SMHI Precipitation normals 1961-1990
Source 2: SMHI average data 2002-2015
