= Nils Ericson =

Swedish mechanical engineer

Friherre Nils Ericson
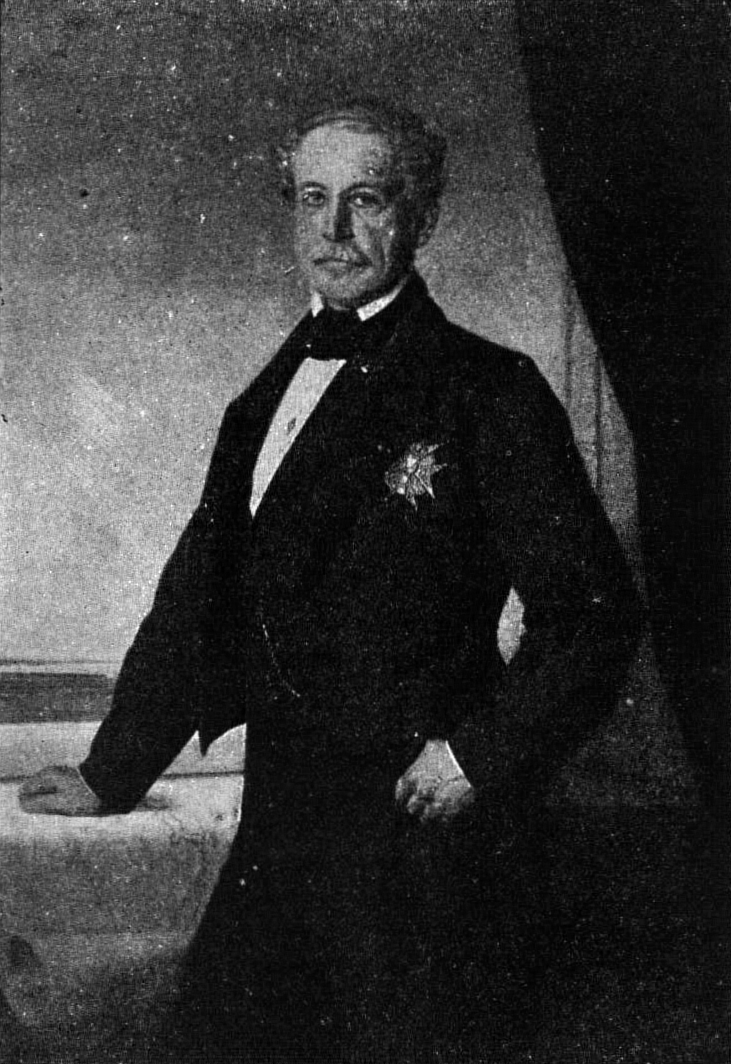
- Late portrait of Nils Ericson, painted by Uno Troili.
- Born: 31 January 1802; Långbanshyttan, Värmland, Sweden
- Died: 8 September 1870 (aged 68); Stockholm, Sweden
- Children: Werner Ericson
- Parent(s): Olof and Brita Sophia (Yngström) Ericsson
- Engineering career
- Discipline: Canal and railway engineer
- Institutions: Royal Swedish Academy of Sciences

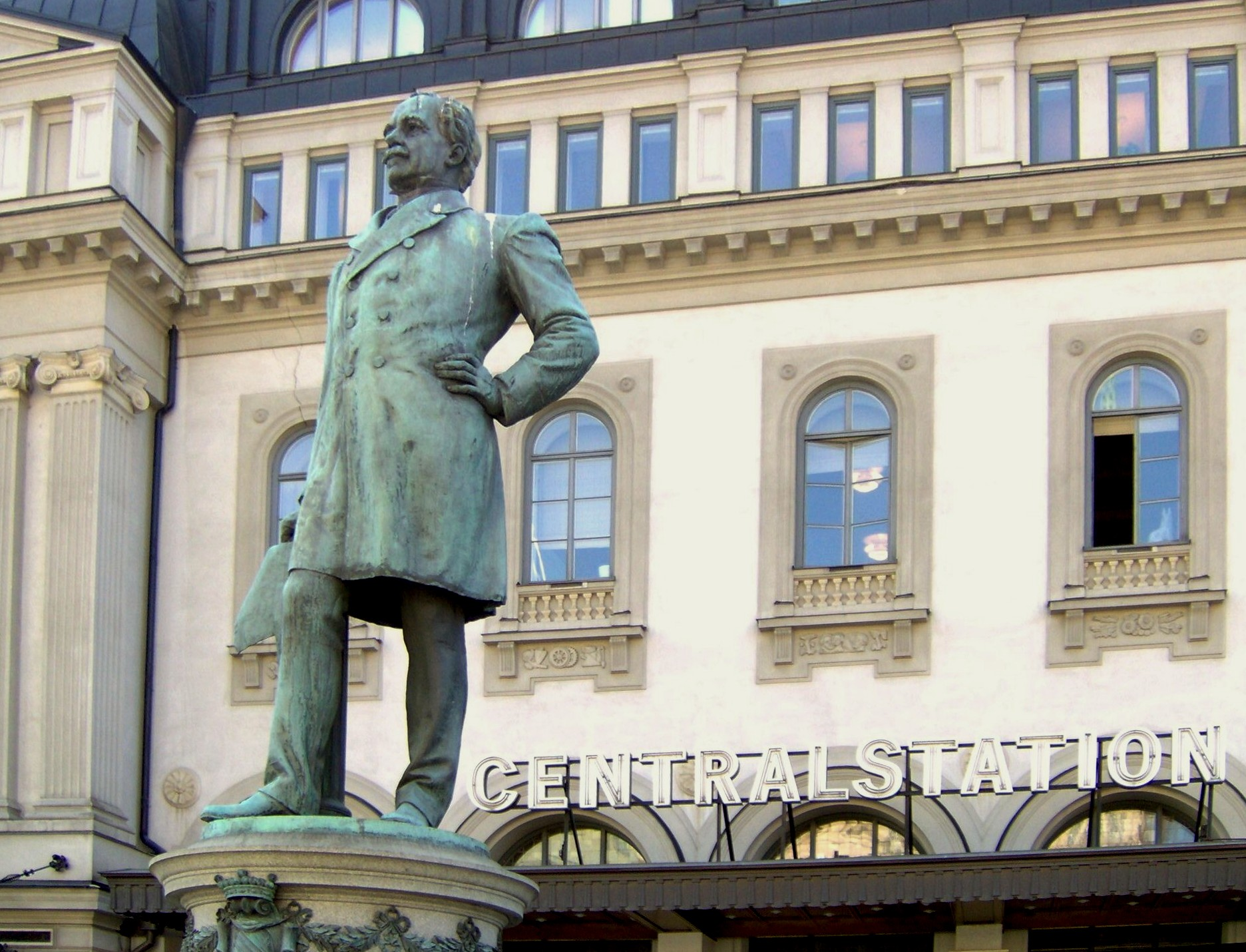
Statue of Nils Ericson in front of Stockholm Central Station

Friherre Nils Ericson (born Nils Ericsson; 31 January 1802 – 8 September 1870) was a Swedish mechanical engineer who built canals and railways in Sweden. His younger brother John Ericsson, who emigrated first to England and then the United States, was also an engineer.

He was raised to the untitled nobility by king Oscar I of Sweden in 1854, and with this he reverted to a spelling of his surname with only one "s". In 1859 he was made a Friherre (equivalent to English Baron), the 403rd such elevation to Sweden's titled nobility.

== Background ==
John and Nils were born in Långbanshyttan, Värmland, Sweden, and received no formal education, but were taught the rudiments of mechanics from an early age by their father, Olof Ericsson. Olof worked as the superintendent of a mine in Värmland until he lost money in speculations and had to move his family to Forsvik, Västergötland, in 1810. There Olof became a director of blastings during the excavation of Sweden's Göta Canal (built 1810–1832). He secured permission for his sons to draw in the office of the draughtsmen of the canal company, where they also learned to draw maps, and he persuaded Lieutenant Brandenburg of the Navy Mechanical Corps to teach them the art of shading and 'finishing off' mechanical drawings before they were in their teens.

Their extraordinary skills were noted and written about by Baltzar von Platen, the architect of the Göta Canal, and they were soon dubbed cadets of mechanics of the Swedish Navy and engaged as trainees at the canal enterprise. When two engineers sent to England by Count Platen to obtain information about canal construction returned in 1815 and began to instruct a number of cadets of the Swedish Corps of Mechanical Engineers, the Ericsson brothers were among them; Nils being then twelve years old and John eleven.

== Career ==
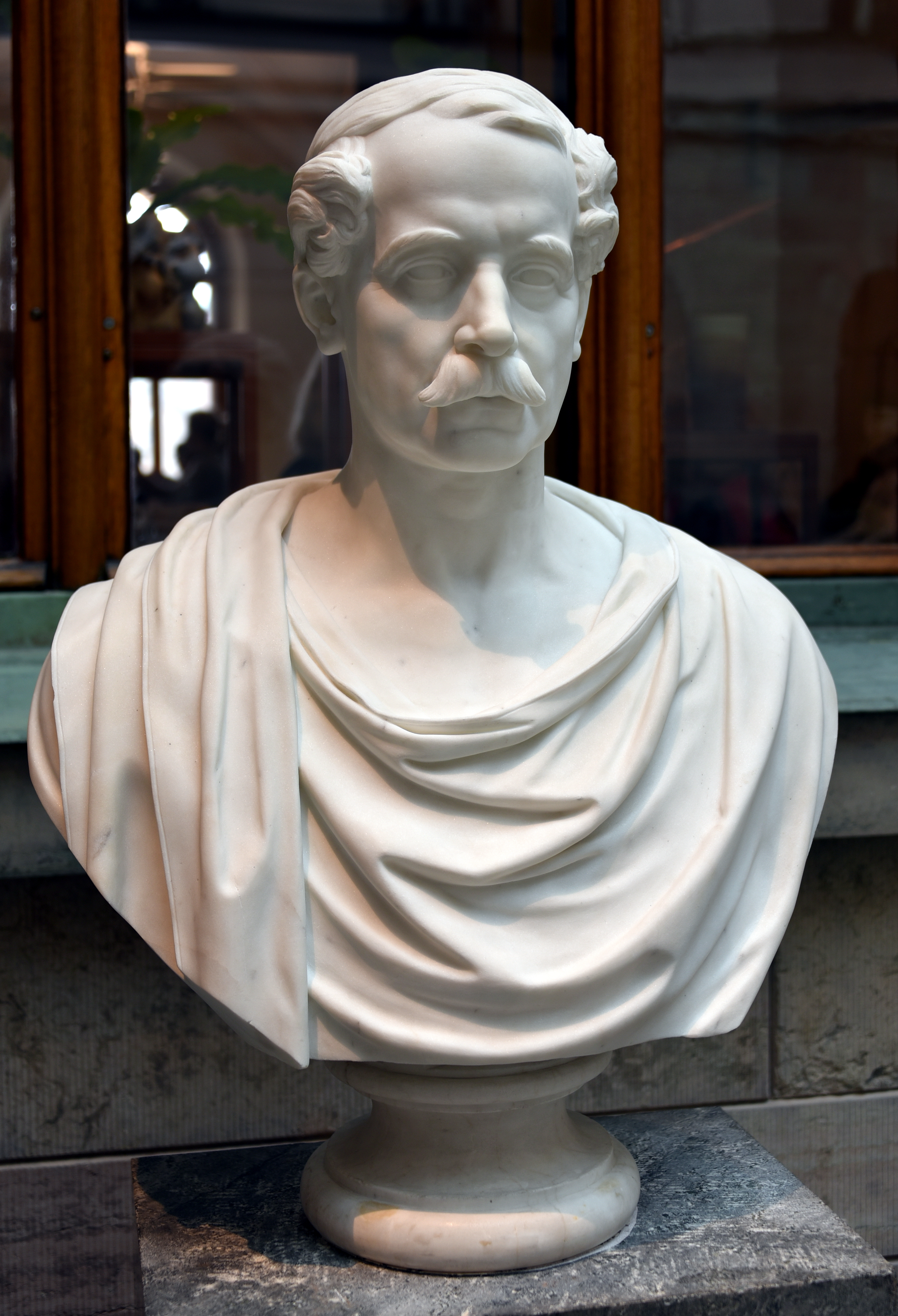
Nils Ericson, Baron and Engineer, by Johannes Fritiof Kjellberg. Marble. Nationalmuseum, Stockholm, Sweden

In 1823 Nils Ericson joined the Engineering corps of the Swedish Army as a second lieutenant, but in 1830 he transferred to the Navy Mechanical Corps (where he eventually advanced to the rank of colonel in 1850). In 1833 he married a daughter of Count von Schwerin in Östergötland.

Between 1830 and 1850 Nils Ericson planned and directed the construction of the canals at Stallbacka, Säffle, Karlstad and Albrektsund. He also led the construction of the Saimaa Canal in Finland (constructed 1845–52), the reconstruction of the Trollhätte Canal in Trollhättan Municipality and the locks at Slussen in Stockholm. In 1845, he was elected a member of the Royal Swedish Academy of Sciences.

After 1850 he was primarily occupied with the design and construction of the Swedish state-owned railway system. At the same time he led the planning of the Dalsland Canal while construction there was being led by his son Werner.

Sweden started building railways later than many other European countries, having hesitated under heavy debate for several years because of the costs and other issues. Following the Riksdag's decision in 1854, Erikson was chosen to lead the project of building the main lines (stambanorna). There was also a decision that, for military reasons, the railways should avoid the coasts as much as possible.

His proposal was that the line between Gothenburg and Stockholm (Western Main Line, Västra stambanan) should run south of Lake Mälaren to avoid competition with shipping. He also proposed that the line between Malmö and Stockholm (Southern Main Line, Södra stambanan) should go north via Nässjö to meet up with Western Main Line at Falköping until the Western's eastward construction reached Katrineholm, where a better junction could be built with a southern line heading directly to Nässjö. This line was called Eastern Main Line (Östra stambanan) but has in modern times been defined to be part of the Southern Main Line. Ericson's proposal also included the railway between Stockholm and Ånge (Northern Main Line, Norra stambanan) and Main Line Through Upper Norrland (Stambanan genom övre Norrland) which runs between Bräcke and Boden. A railway between Oslo and Laxå (Northwestern Main Line, Nordvästra stambanan) was also planned, to connect with Western Main Line.

The first parts of the Western and Southern lines were opened in 1856. Ericson resigned in 1862 when all of the Western line opened, and in 1864 the Southern line was opened in its entirety. Northwestern line was opened in 1871, Eastern line in 1874, Northern line in 1881 and the line through Upper Norrland in 1894. When Ericson resigned in 1862 his authority was divided between two agencies (the Building Bureau and the Traffic Bureau) until the formation of Kungliga Järnvägsstyrelsen (the Royal Railway Committee) in 1888.

Ericson died in Stockholm in 1870, aged 68, and lies buried in Stockholm's Northern Cemetery (Norra begravningsplatsen).

== Monuments and memorials ==
- A bronze statue of Ericson stands on the forecourt outside Stockholm's central railway station.
- The Nils Ericson Terminal bus station joined to the central railway station in Gothenburg is named after him.

== See also ==
- History of rail transport in Sweden
- List of Swedish noble families
