= Glaskogen =

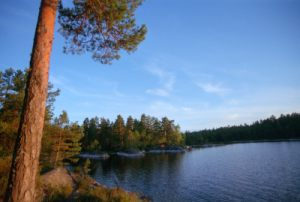
- Stora Gla, August 2008

- Location within Sweden
- Coordinates: 59°30′N 12°22′E
- Country: Sweden
- Province: Värmland

Area
  - Total: 280 km^{2} (110 sq mi)
- Website: www.glaskogen.se

Glaskogen is a nature reserve located in the province of Värmland, between the municipalities of Årjäng and Arvika, in the west mid-Sweden. It was established as a nature reserve in 1970 and has a land area of about 28,000 hectares (69,000 acres). The reserve was established by the County Administration of Värmland, which led to the formation of the Gla Forest Foundation in 1972 by the four local municipalities Arvika, Eda, Säffle and Årjäng.

== Geography and fauna ==
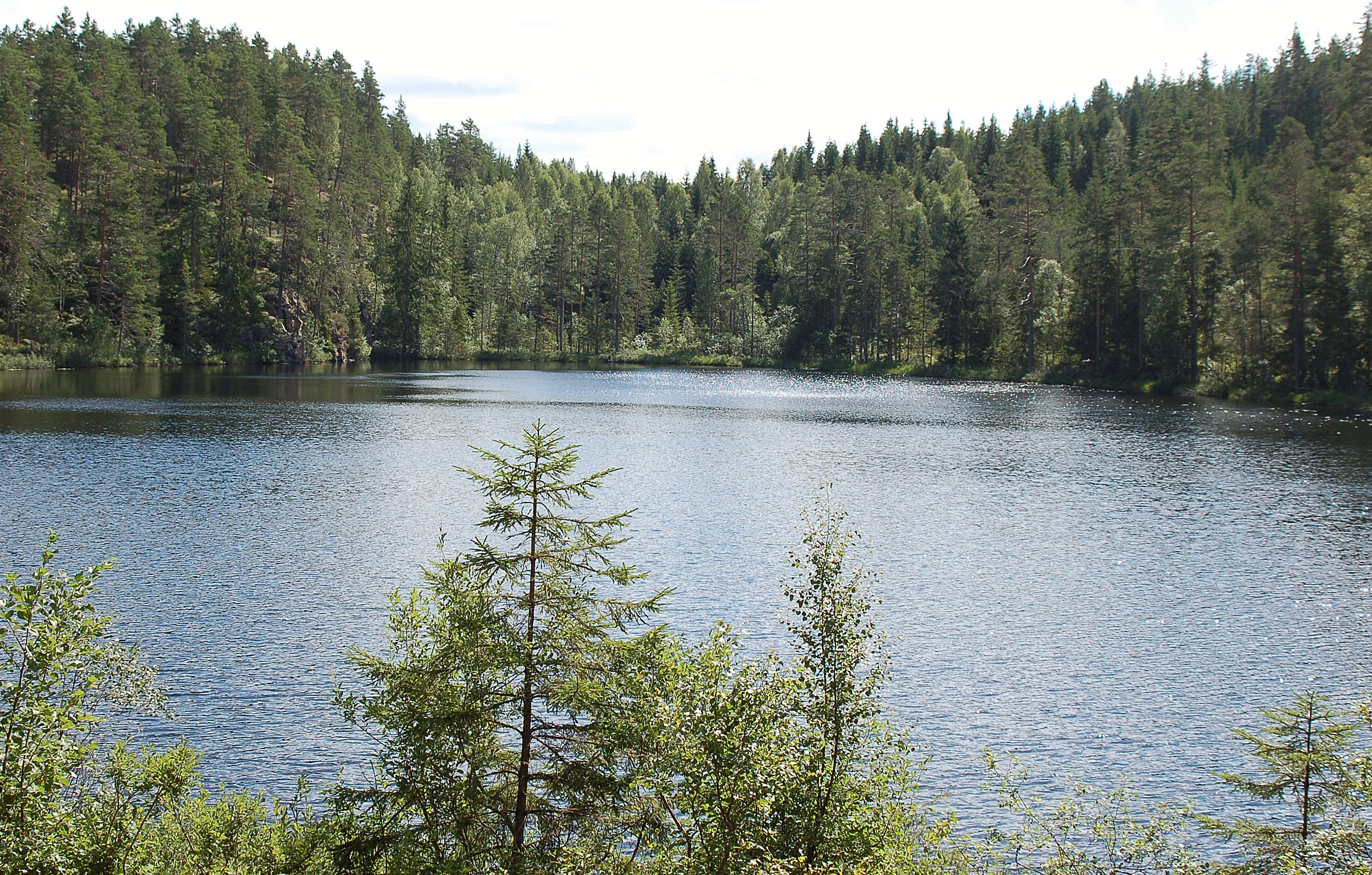
Bergstjärnet, a lake located within the nature reserve.

In the heart of the forest there's a little village called Lenungshammar which has a population of about 30 people, here is also trailer and wilderness camping which is popular among tourists. There is an informations center, cafeteria, a small shop and a place to rent bikes and canoes.

The reserve comprises many lakes, Stora Gla and Övre Gla being the largest. The terrain is very hilly. The reserve is inhabited by many birds such as lesser whitethroats, three-toed woodpecker, spotted nutcracker, goldcrests. By the lakes you can find red-throated divers and loons.

Glaskogen is known for its hiking trails. With an estimated total of 300 km (190 mi) of hiking trails. The many lakes located in the reserve make it a popular fishing preserve and canoe trip for tourists.

== History ==
Glaskogen was first populated by Finnish immigrants who sought settlement in the late 1500s. The legend says that the first people to seek settlement here only brought a knife, axe and a loonskinn filled with rye grains. The first settlers exerted burn-beating. They mainly lived in small huts and cottages on the highgrounds of the natural reservoir, that way they could grow their grain in the valleys down below.

The oldest preserved building is a bathhouse located in the southern parts of Finnskogen, in the east of a place called Mörtnäs. It is estimated to have been built 1638.

The first mention of Glaskogen occurred in a publication in 1610 and it is mentioned in a lot of publications after that. Up until the 1940s, there was traces of the Finnish influence in the dialect used by people around the area of Glaskogen. Especially the Swedish consonants b, p, d, t, g and k. Today it's hard to spot, it seems that the influence has been neutralised by generations of assimilation into the Swedish society.

== Industrialisation ==
Since Glaskogen is so rich in nature resources it became industrialized in the beginning of the 1800s. At this time, Glaskogen was an important source of timber and fuel. Thanks to the many lakes, it was easy to transport the wood by boat.

Glava Glassworks is situated in Glaskogen. The workshop was founded in 1859 near lake Stora Gla by two brothers named Anders and Petter Olsson. Anders and Petter owned large forest properties which helped them to provide fuel for the manufacturing process in the glassworks. The workshop was known for its blown glass, especially windows. In 1911, it stood for an estimated 38% of Sweden's production of windows. Since March 1939 the glassworks has been closed. A lot of the buildings were demolished while, as of 2019, some are used as glass museums, hostels and housings.

== Supernatural beings ==
During the 1800s people were more superstitious than today. This was perhaps the case in Glaskogen, which resulted in a lot of paranormal legends of strange creatures who were lurking in the woods.

=== Hobergsgubben ===
According to legend, there was a friendly giant, not to be confused with Hoburgsgubben rauk on the Swedish island of Gotland. There's a tale where a man who sent his farmhand to the giant to invite him to an infant baptism. The Giant declines the invitation but wishes to donate to the childs baptism. The giant brings a huge chest full of goldpennies of which he proceeds to ladle pennies into a sack for the farmhand to bring back to the baptised child.
