= Egenäs =

- Location within Värmland County Location within Sweden
- Coordinates: 59°12′29″N 12°02′44″E
- Country: Sweden
- Province: Värmland
- County: Värmland County
- Municipality: Årjäng

Egenäs is a small village in Årjäng Municipality, western Värmland, and located near Dalsland, Sweden.
