= Långban =

Coordinates: 59°51′N 14°15′E

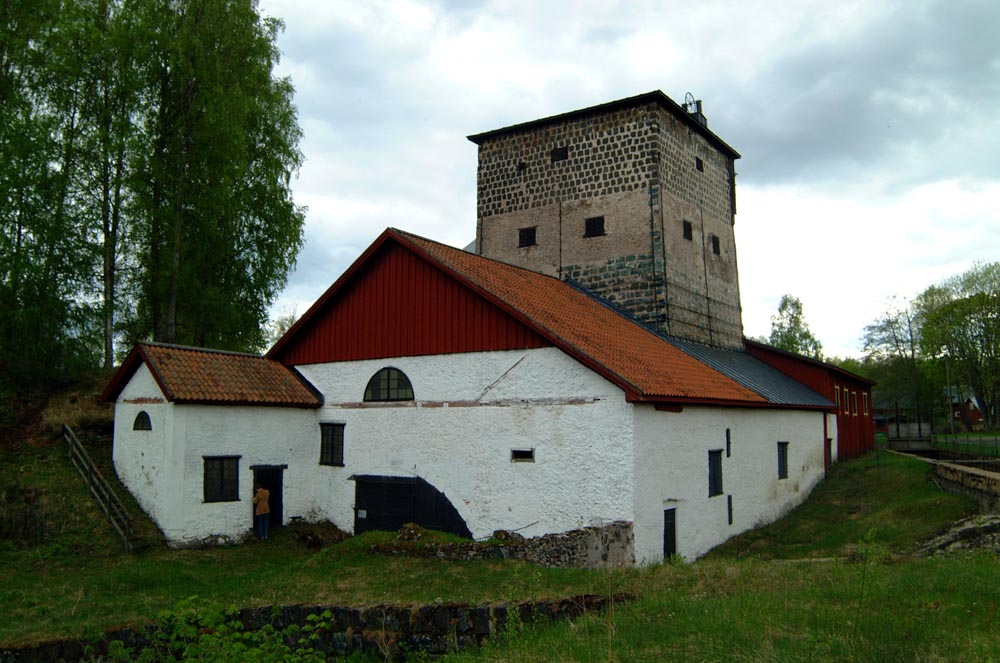
The Långban blast furnace, 2004

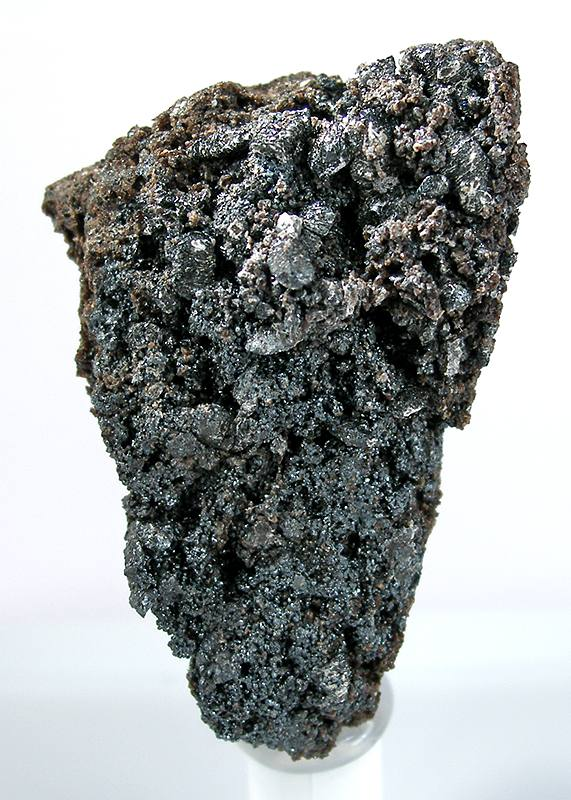
A specimen of massive braunite with sparkling microcrystalline kentrolite, from the Norrbotten working, Långban.

Långban is a mining area in Värmland in Sweden. It belongs to Filipstad Municipality, with the nearest city being Filipstad, 21 km south. It was systematically mined through 1711–1972, but has traces from the 15th century. It is the birthplace of Swedish-American inventor John Ericsson and his brother Nils Ericson.

It has been described as one of the most mineral-rich places in the world. The first discovery of native lead was in the Långban District in the late nineteenth century. Over 270 different minerals have been identified in the area and more than 60 of these have Långban as type locality. Most mining was done for iron ore and manganese ore, but in total, 300 minerals have been found. After 1950, only dolomite was extracted.

== Långbanshyttan ==
Långbanshyttan is the name of an adjacent blast furnace and adjacent house of the factory manager, where the brothers Nils and John Ericsson were born. The furnace was built in the 16th century, and used until 1933. It was renovated 1980-83 and is today a tourist attraction.

== Gallery ==
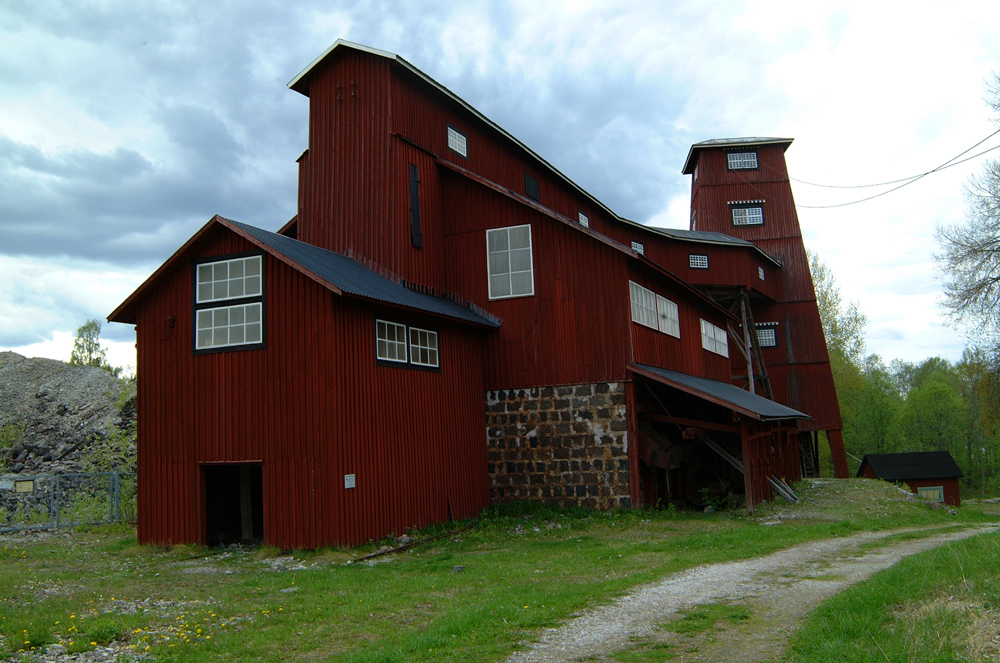
Conditioning facility und new shaft in the ore mine

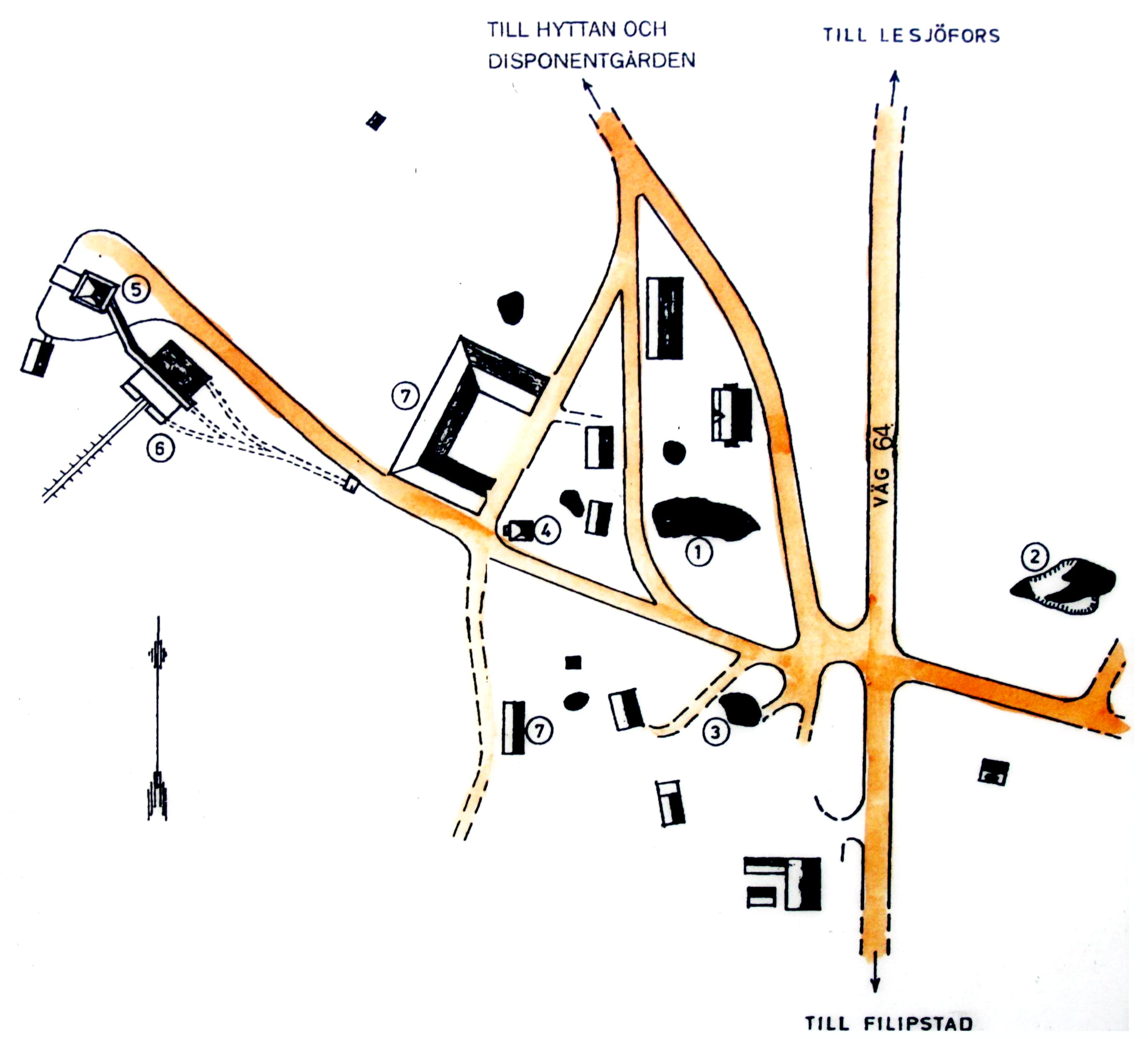
Map of the pit

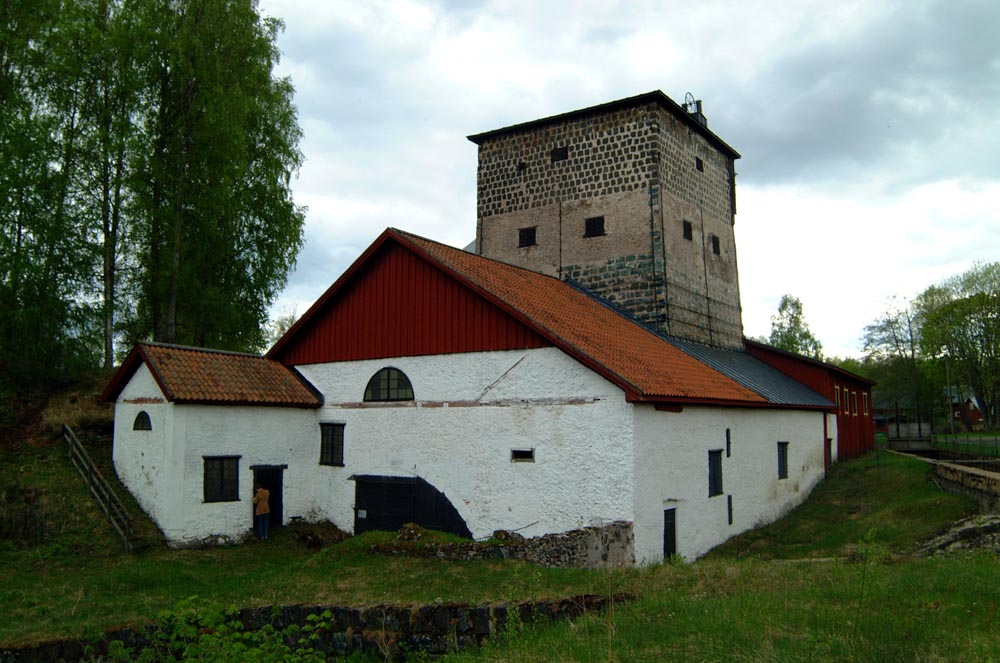
Smelting furnace

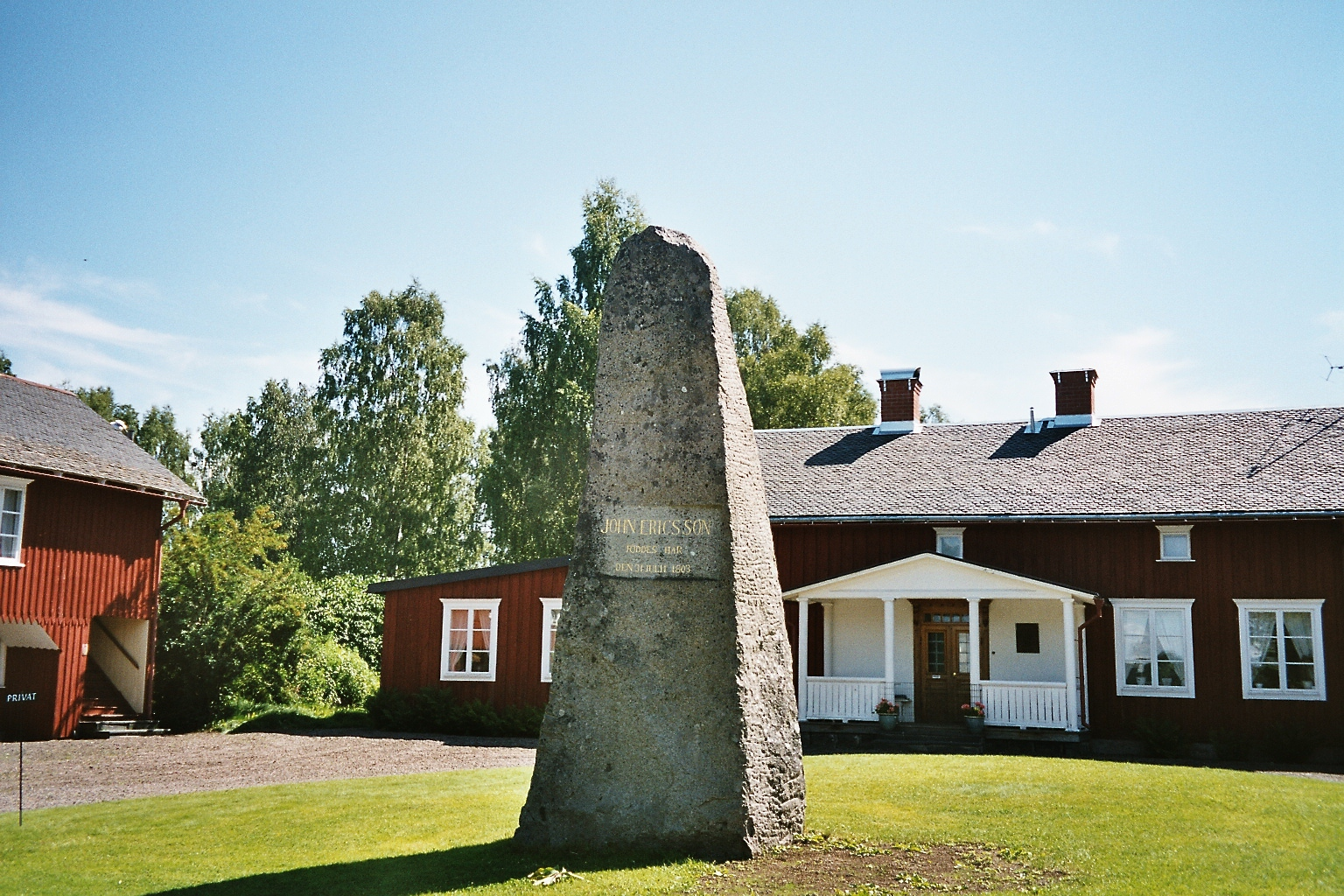
Birth house of John Ericsson with memorial stone
