= Årjängstravet =

Horse racing track in Årjäng, Värmland, Sweden

Coordinates: 59°23′27″N 12°09′38″E

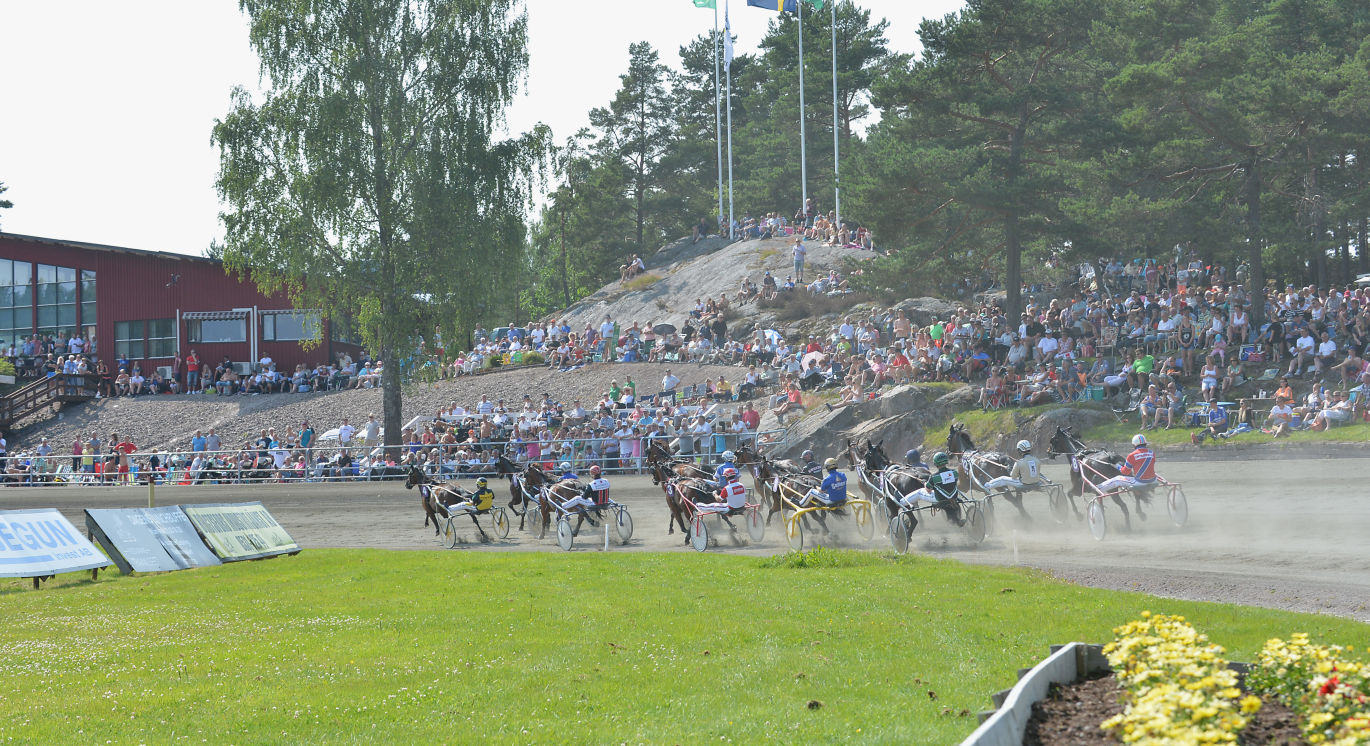
Årjäng Big Sprinter Race

Årjängstravet is a horse racing track for harness racing, located in Årjäng, Värmland County, Sweden. Årjängstravet is known as "the most beautiful harness racing course in Sweden". Årjängstravet arranges about 20 horse racing events in a year.

== History ==
The course was built in 1936. Eight men transformed a mire to a fully usable kilometer harness racing course using shovels, wheelbarrows and 3-5 North Swedish horses; they completed the building of the track in ten weeks. The men behind the work were: Ossian Jonasson, Gunnar Jonasson, Reidar Jonasson, Cato Kristiansson, Ragnar Alfredsson, Sven Alfredsson, Tyko Kylén and Georg Nilsson. The premier use of the racetrack was on 30 September, in the same year.

== Major events ==
Årjäng Big Sprinter Race.
