= Skåpafors =

- Location within Västra Götaland Location within Sweden
- Coordinates: 59°01′N 12°16′E
- Country: Sweden
- Province: Dalsland
- County: Västra Götaland County
- Municipality: Bengtsfors Municipality

Area
  - Total: 1.12 km^{2} (0.43 sq mi)

Population (31 December 2010)
  - Total: 313
  - Density: 279/km^{2} (720/sq mi)
- Time zone: UTC+1 (CET)
  - Summer (DST): UTC+2 (CEST)
- Climate: Dfb

Skåpafors is a locality situated in Bengtsfors Municipality, Västra Götaland County, Sweden. It had 313 inhabitants in 2010.
