= Töcksfors =

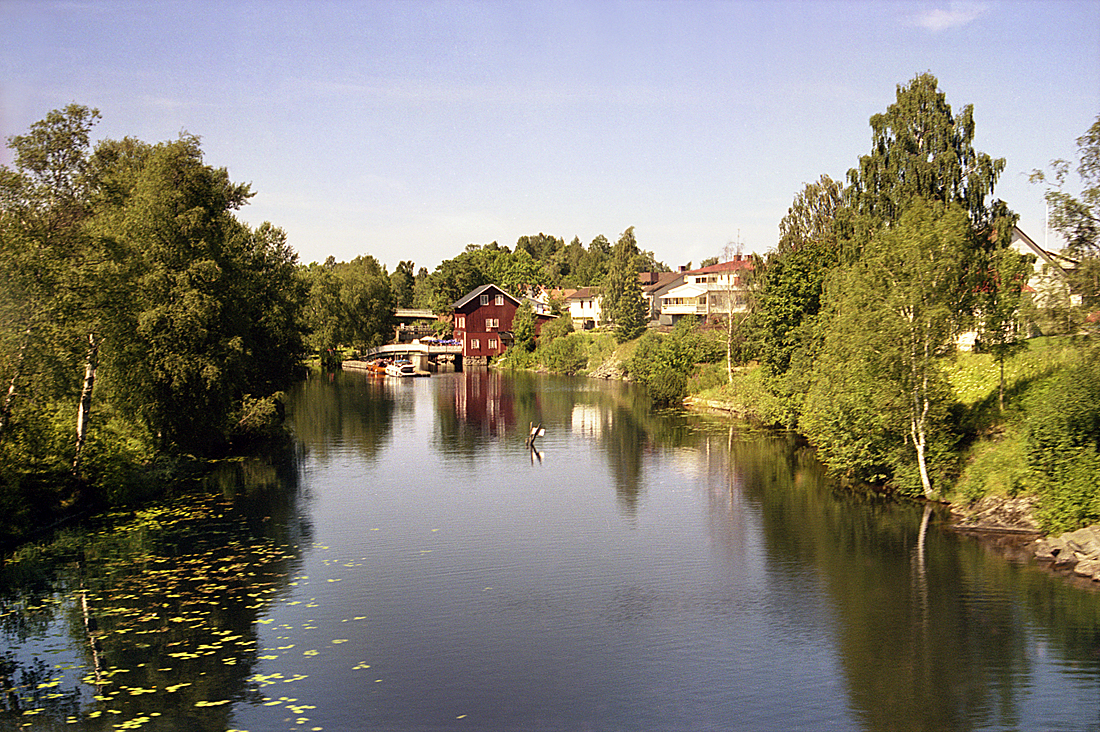

- Location within Sweden
- Coordinates: 59°30′29″N 11°50′39″E
- Country: Sweden
- Province: Värmland
- County: Värmland County
- Municipality: Årjäng Municipality

Area
  - Total: 1.91 km^{2} (0.74 sq mi)

Population (31 December 2010)
  - Total: 1,247
  - Density: 607/km^{2} (1,570/sq mi)
- Time zone: UTC+1 (CET)
  - Summer (DST): UTC+2 (CEST)

Töcksfors is a locality situated in Årjäng Municipality, Värmland County, Sweden with 1,247 inhabitants in 2018.
