= Årjäng Municipality =

Årjäng Municipality Årjängs kommun
- Municipality
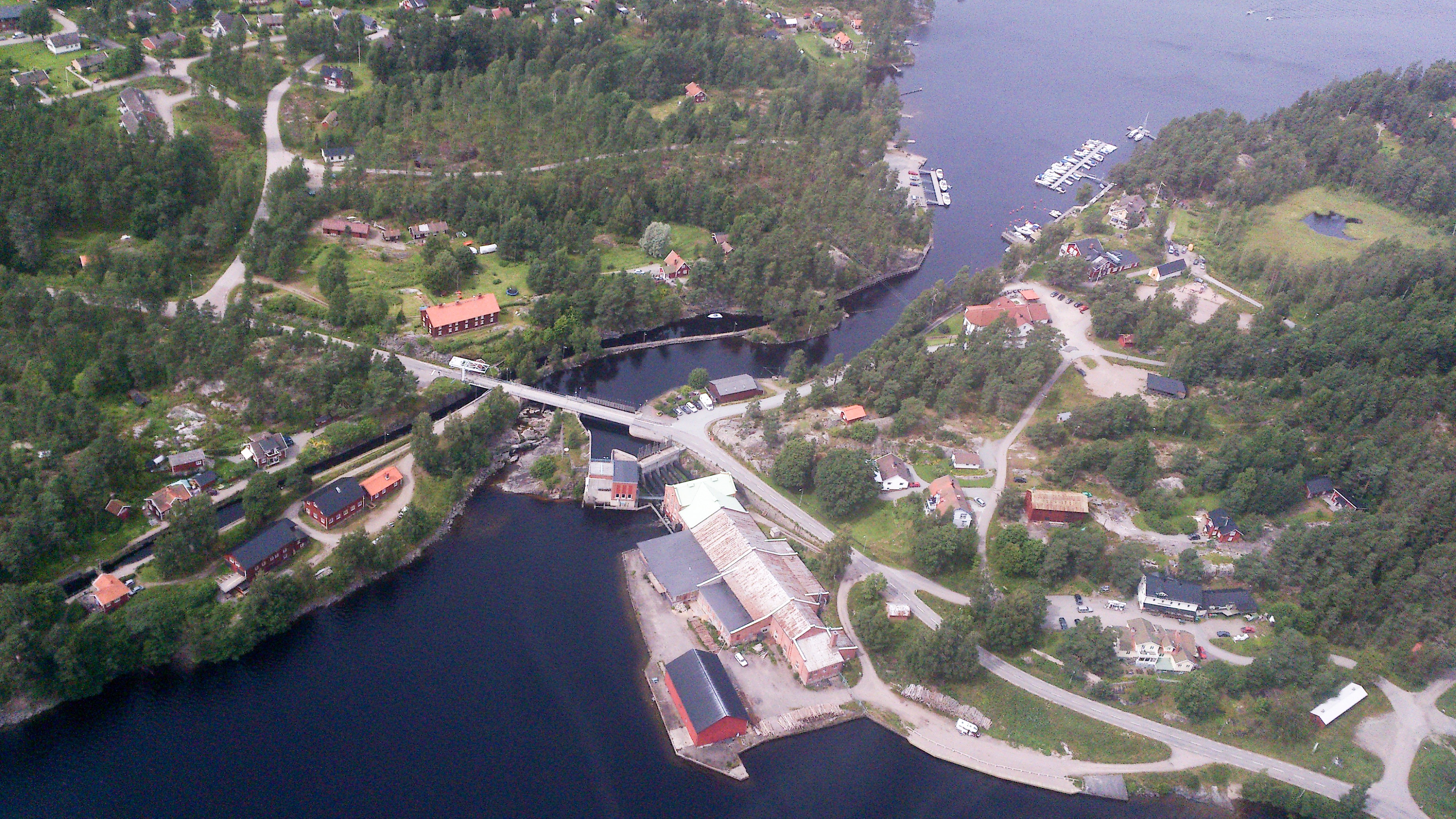
- Lennartsfors

- Coat of arms

- Coordinates: 59°23′N 12°08′E
- Country: Sweden
- County: Värmland County
- Seat: Årjäng

Area
  - Total: 1,653.04 km^{2} (638.24 sq mi)
  - Land: 1,409.47 km^{2} (544.20 sq mi)
  - Water: 243.57 km^{2} (94.04 sq mi)
- Area as of 1 January 2014.

Population (30 June 2025)
  - Total: 9,789
  - Density: 6.945/km^{2} (17.99/sq mi)
- Time zone: UTC+1 (CET)
  - Summer (DST): UTC+2 (CEST)
- ISO 3166 code: SE
- Province: Värmland and Dalsland
- Municipal code: 1765
- Website: www.arjang.se

Årjäng Municipality (Swedish: Årjängs kommun) is a municipality in Värmland County in west central Sweden, bordering Norway. Its seat is located in the town of Årjäng.

A separate local government entity named Årjäng was created in 1941 when it was detached from Silbodal. In 1952 the two were reunited under the name of Årjäng. In 1971 Sillerud and Holmedal were amalgamated with Årjäng. In 1974 Töcksmark was added, expanding the municipality to its current size. The municipality contains two localities, Årjäng and Töcksfors. Known Swedish sportsmen from this municipality are Per-Gunnar Andersson and Thomas Wassberg.

== Demographics ==
This is a demographic table based on Årjäng Municipality's electoral districts in the 2022 Swedish general election sourced from SVT's election platform, in turn taken from SCB official statistics.

In total there were 9,936 residents, including 6,896 Swedish citizens of voting age. 35.4% voted for the left coalition and 63.8% for the right coalition. Indicators are in percentage points except population totals and income.

Location	Residents	Citizen adults	Left vote	Right vote	Employed	Swedish parents	Foreign heritage	Income SEK	Degree
Location			%	%					
Holmedal	1,453	1,030	34.4	64.9	72	80	20	25,163	22
Sillerud	1,087	833	28.2	70.7	80	91	9	25,065	20
Töcksfors	2,688	1,645	31.2	68.1	63	65	35	26,490	21
Årjäng N	1,838	1,348	39.2	59.7	69	71	29	20,471	21
Årjäng V	1,685	1,200	40.6	59.1	69	76	24	23,680	21
Årjäng Ö	1,185	840	37.3	61.8	74	77	23	24,749	25
Source: SVT

== See also ==
- Egenäs
