= Dalsland Canal =

Canal in Dalsland, Sweden

Coordinates: 58°51′N 12°24′E

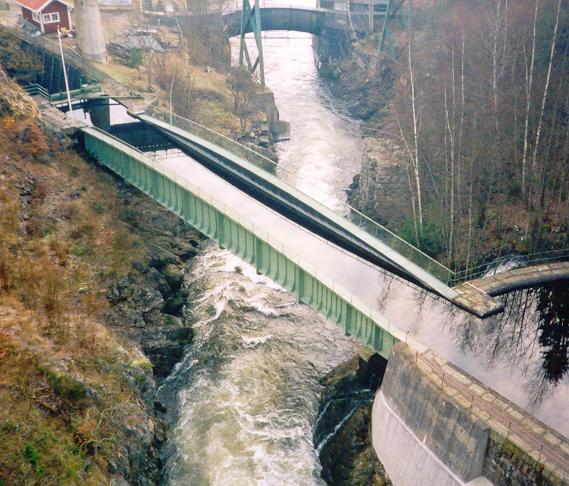
- Håverud Aqueduct

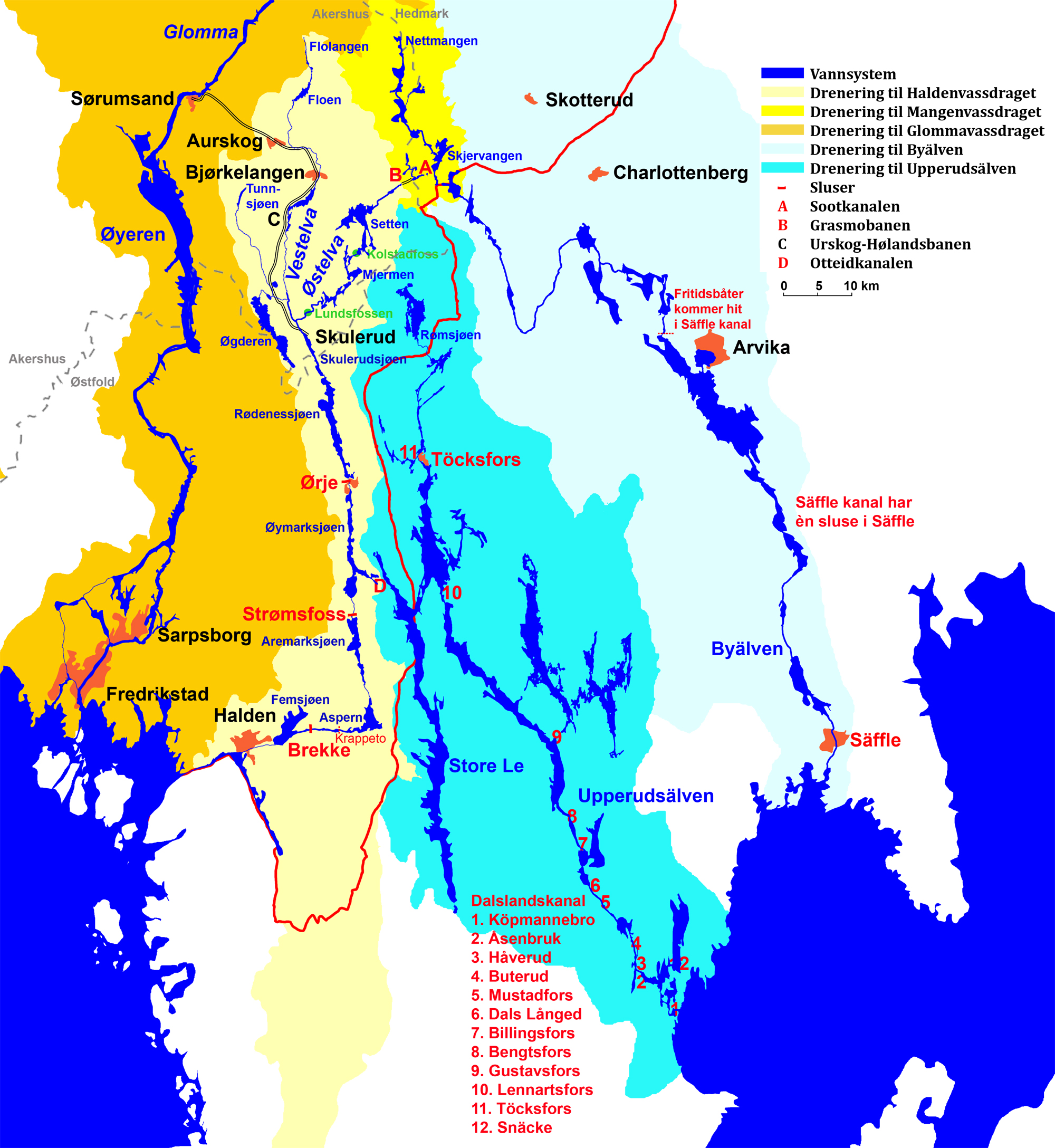

Specifications
- Length: 250 km (160 miles)
- Maximum boat length: 22.75 m (74 ft 7.7 in)
- Maximum boat beam: 4.05 m (13 ft 3 in) (originally 111 m or 364 ft 2 in)
- Minimum boat draft: 1.8 metres (5.9 ft)
- Minimum boat air draft: 12 metres (39 ft)
- Maximum height AMSL: 111 m (364 ft)

History
- Principal engineer: Nils Ericson
- Construction began: 1864
- Date of first use: 1868

Geography
- Start point: Lake Östen, Östervallskog, Värmland, Sweden
- End point: Lake Vänern, Köpmannebro, Dalsland, Sweden
- Branch: Snäcke Canal

Dalsland Canal (Swedish: Dalslands kanal) is a Swedish canal that enables ships to sail between Lake Vänern and central parts of the Dalsland and southwestern Värmland lake districts. The canal runs across the well-known aqueduct at Håverud and is a much visited tourist attraction during the summer months, drawing yachts, motor boats as well as canoeists.

== Geography ==
The canal system stretches from Köpmannebro on Lake Vänern via the Dalsland lakes of Råvarpen, Laxsjön, Lelång and continues into southwestern Värmland by means of the lakes of Foxen, Töck and finally reaches Lake Östen and its extension named Snäcke Canal. The lakes of Stora Le and both Västra Silen and Östra Silen are also deemed part of the canal system. A boat lift at Strandviken on Stora Le Nössemark enables ships to be loaded onto lorries to Halden in Norway and continue their journey down Idefjord and Svinesund to Skagerrak. Stora Le is situated 66 m (217 ft) above Lake Vänern. Thirty-one locks help to span this drop. 17 metres of head space along the route enables sail boats to ply the entire length of the canal, in contrast to many other canals in Sweden. However, it pays to note that only 1.8 m (6 ft) of draught and a maximum length of 22.75 m and width of 4.05 m are allowed. Maximum speed on the canal is set at 2.5 knots.

== History ==
The canal was dug between 1864 and 1868 by engineer Nils Ericson. Only 12 km (7.5 mi) out of the 250 km stretch of the canal system had to be dug or dynamited, as Ericson made good use of the numerous lakes which span this area.

== Canal use ==
The canal is exploited by the Dalslands Kanal AB company, seated in Åmål. The canal dues are SEK50 per lock for small boats up to SEK2500 for the whole canal back and forth (in 2010). Several shipping companies offer short cruises on the canal. The Dalsland kanotmaraton + canoeing competition is partly held on lakes forming part of the canal system.

== See also ==
Gustavsfors
