= Bengtsfors Municipality =

Bengtsfors Municipality Bengtsfors kommun
- Municipality
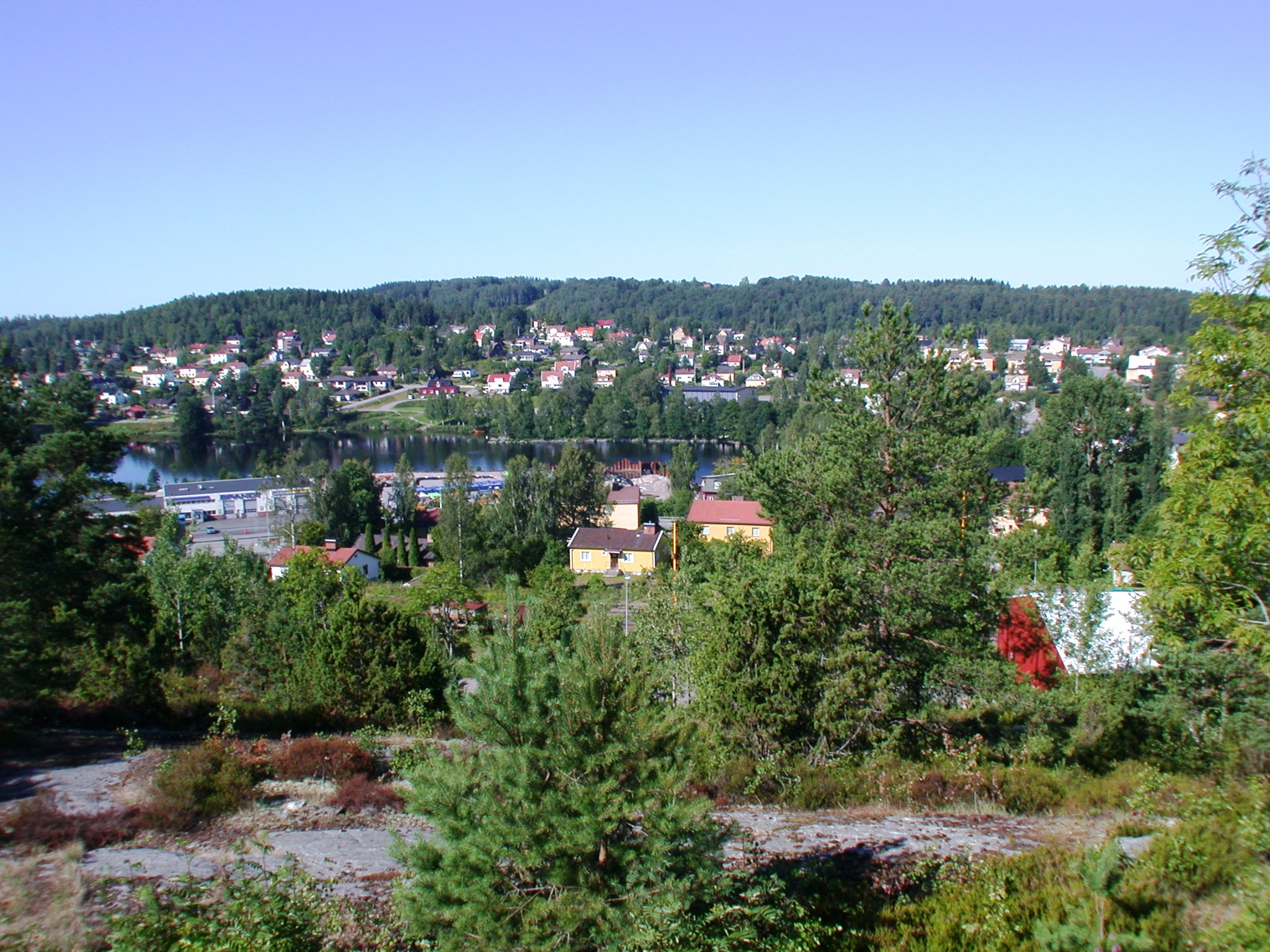

- Coat of arms

- Coordinates: 59°02′N 12°13′E
- Country: Sweden
- County: Västra Götaland County
- Seat: Bengtsfors

Area
  - Total: 1,059.19 km^{2} (408.96 sq mi)
  - Land: 882.93 km^{2} (340.90 sq mi)
  - Water: 176.26 km^{2} (68.05 sq mi)
- Area as of 1 January 2014.

Population (30 June 2025)
  - Total: 8,984
  - Density: 10.18/km^{2} (26.35/sq mi)
- Time zone: UTC+1 (CET)
  - Summer (DST): UTC+2 (CEST)
- ISO 3166 code: SE
- Province: Dalsland
- Municipal code: 1460
- Website: www.bengtsfors.se
- Density is calculated using land area only.

Bengtsfors Municipality (Swedish: Bengtsfors kommun) is a municipality in Västra Götaland County in western Sweden. Its seat is located in the town of Bengtsfors.

The present municipality was formed in 1971 when the former market town (köping) of Bengtsfors (instituted in 1926) was amalgamated with the municipalities of Bäckefors, Lelång and Steneby.

== Geography ==
The municipality has much water areas, consisting of lakes and streams. It makes it a good place for canoeing, fishing and bathing.

Every year a canoeing marathon called Dalslands Kanot Marathon+, or DKM+, is held. It is an enduring 55 km long (a marathon "plus"), stretching through the many municipal streams, and one of Sweden's largest canoeing competitions.

Bengtsfors is also crossed by the Dalsland Canal.

=== Localities ===
Localities in the municipality and inhabitants:

- Bengtsfors (seat), 3,600 inh.
- Billingsfors, 1,400 inh.
- Bäckefors, 750 inh.
- Dals Långed, 1,700 inh.
- Gustavsfors, 700 inh.
- Skåpafors, 400 inh.

== Demographics ==
This is a demographic table based on Bengtsfors Municipality's electoral districts in the 2022 Swedish general election sourced from SVT's election platform, in turn taken from SCB official statistics.

In total there were 9,389 residents, including 7,070 Swedish citizens of voting age. 46.3% voted for the left coalition and 52.9% for the right coalition. Indicators are in percentage points except population totals and income.

Location	Residents	Citizen adults	Left vote	Right vote	Employed	Swedish parents	Foreign heritage	Income SEK	Degree
Location			%	%					
Nordvästra	2,300	1,659	44.7	54.7	69	70	30	21,073	26
Nordöstra	1,886	1,340	45.5	53.5	68	70	30	21,256	23
Norra	2,063	1,610	45.9	53.3	82	83	17	24,544	31
Sydvästra	1,439	1,136	36.7	62.8	77	87	13	22,915	20
Sydöstra	1,701	1,325	55.9	43.0	70	82	18	20,036	35
Source: SVT
