= Bäckefors =

- Location within Västra Götaland Location within Sweden
- Coordinates: 58°48′N 12°10′E
- Country: Sweden
- Province: Dalsland
- County: Västra Götaland County
- Municipality: Bengtsfors Municipality

Area
  - Total: 1.40 km^{2} (0.54 sq mi)

Population (31 December 2010)
  - Total: 673
  - Density: 481/km^{2} (1,250/sq mi)
- Time zone: UTC+1 (CET)
  - Summer (DST): UTC+2 (CEST)
- Climate: Dfb

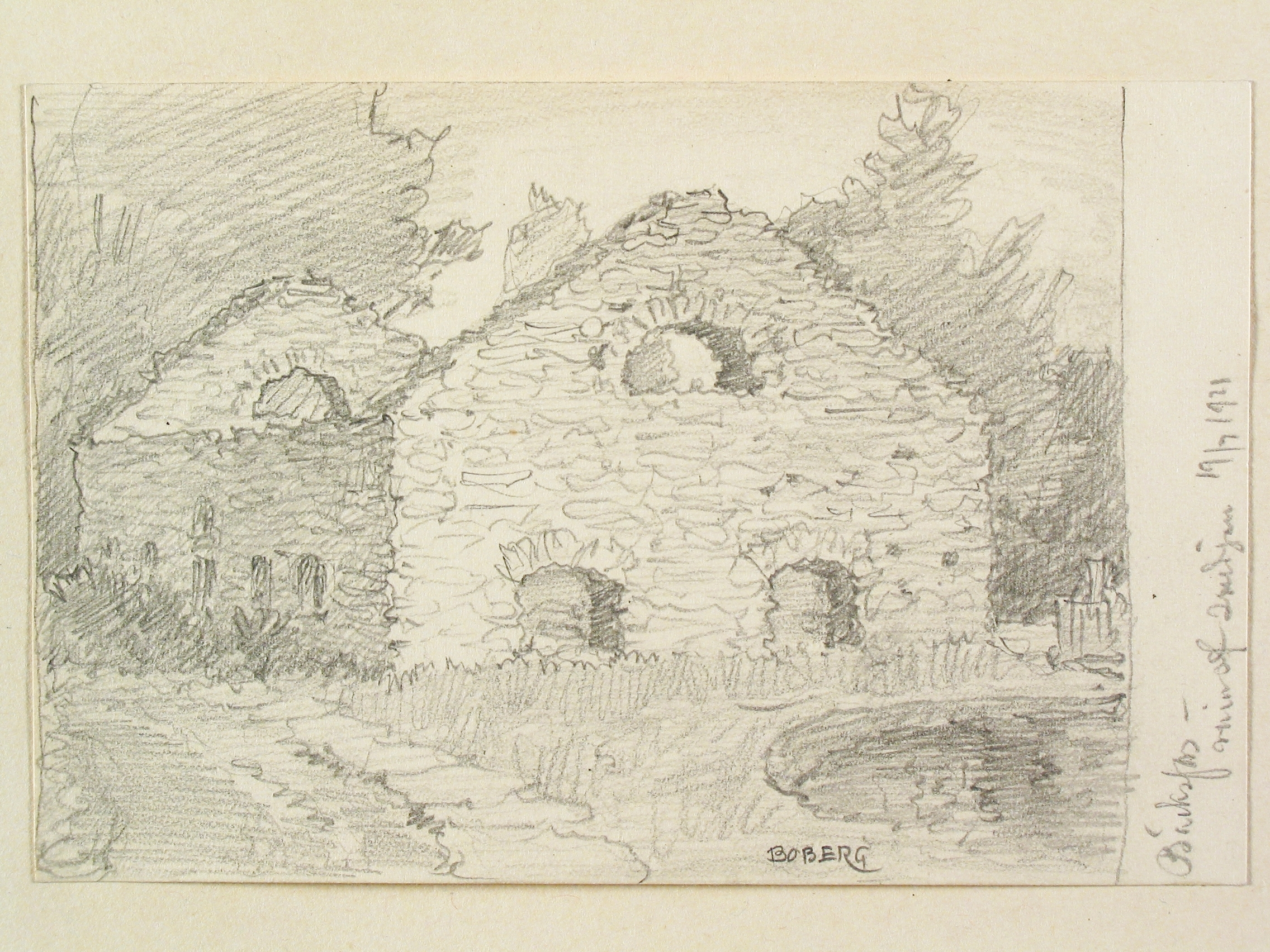
Dalsland, Bäckefors. Ruin of a blacksmith shop. Drawing by Ferdinand Boberg

Bäckefors is a locality situated in Bengtsfors Municipality, Västra Götaland County, Sweden. It had 673 inhabitants in 2010.

The Movie Kopps was filmed here in 2003.

The hospital Dalslands Sjukhus is located here.

Bäckefors was an important rail hub during the World War II, when many trains passed here with German soldiers.
