= Värmland County =

County (län) of Sweden

Coordinates: 59°25′32″N 13°16′17″E

Värmland County Värmlands län (Swedish)
- County of Sweden
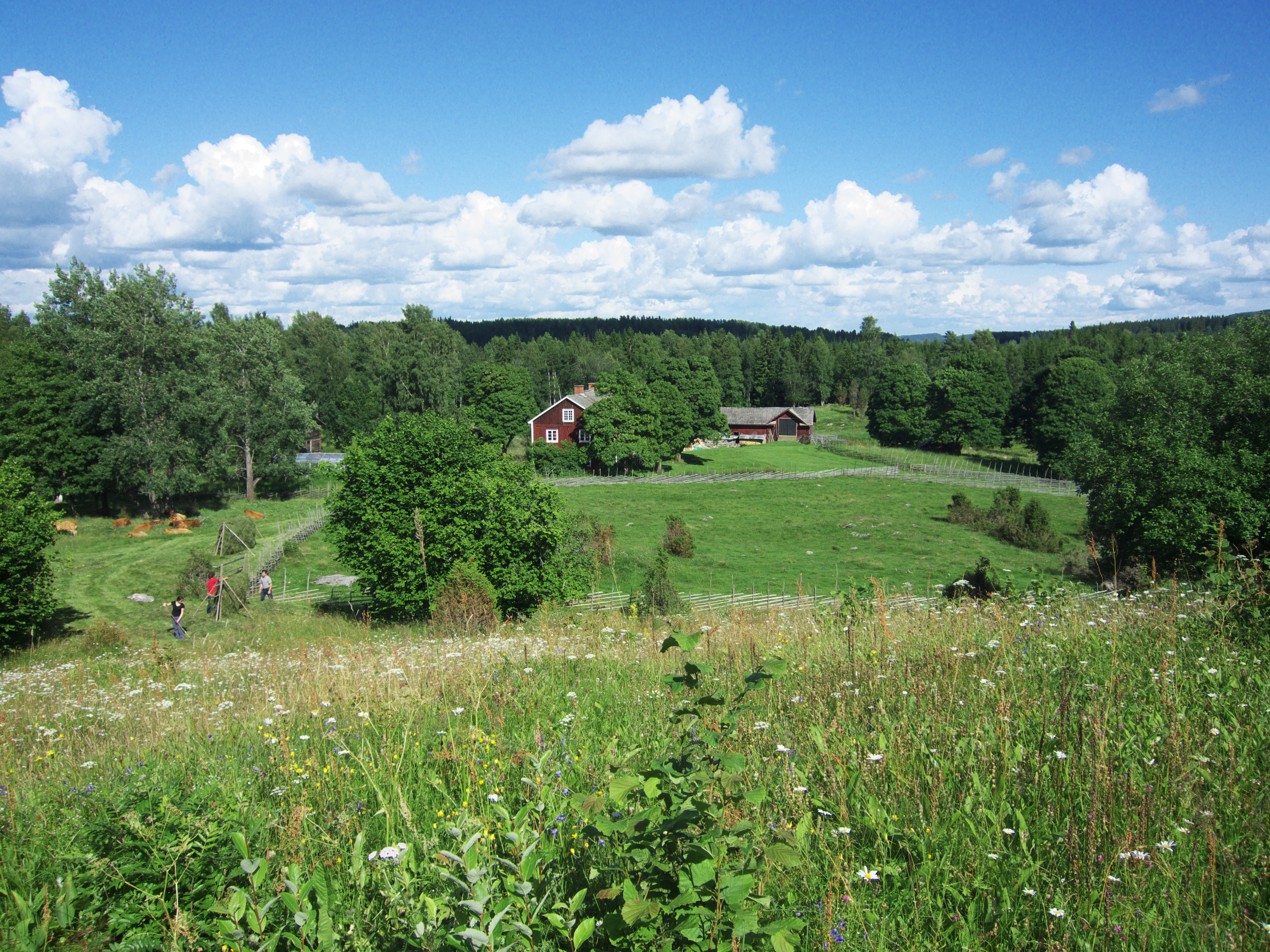

- Flag Coat of arms

- Värmland County in Sweden

- Location map of Värmland County in Sweden
- Country: Sweden
- Founded: 1779
- Capital: Karlstad
- Municipalities: 16: Årjäng; Arvika; Eda; Filipstad; Forshaga; Grums; Hagfors; Hammarö; Karlstad; Kil; Kristinehamn; Munkfors; Säffle; Storfors; Sunne; Torsby

Government
  - Governor: Georg Andrén
  - Council: Region Värmland

Area
  - Total: 17,591 km^{2} (6,792 sq mi)

Population (31 December 2023)
  - Total: 283,548
  - Density: 16.119/km^{2} (41.748/sq mi)

GDP
  - Total: SEK 91 billion €9.695 billion (2015)
- Time zone: UTC+1 (CET)
  - Summer (DST): UTC+2 (CEST)
- ISO 3166 code: SE-S
- NUTS Region: SE311
- Website: www.s.lst.se

Värmland County (Swedish: Värmlands län, pronounced [ˈvɛrmlandˌs lɛːn]) is a county or län in west central Sweden. It borders the Swedish counties of Dalarna, Örebro and Västra Götaland, as well as the Norwegian counties of Østfold, Akershus and Innlandet to the west.

== Province ==
The county has more or less the same boundaries as Värmland Province, except that the municipalities of Karlskoga and Degerfors are part of Örebro County.

== Administration ==
Värmland County was formed in 1779, when it was separated from Närke and Värmland County.

The main aim of the County Administrative Board is to fulfil the goals set in national politics by the Riksdag and the Government, to coordinate the interests of the county, to promote the development of the county, to establish regional goals and safeguard the due process of law in the handling of each case. The County Administrative Board is a Government Agency headed by a Governor. See List of Värmland Governors.

== Politics ==
The County Council of Värmland is called Region Värmland.

== Riksdag elections ==
The table details all Riksdag election results of Värmland County since the unicameral era began in 1970. The blocs denote which party would support the Prime Minister or the lead opposition party towards the end of the elected parliament.

Year	Turnout	Votes	V	S	MP	C	L	KD	M	SD	NyD	Left	Right
1970	88.9	183,757	4.3	51.1		20.1	14.3	2.2	7.6			55.9	42.7
1973	91.6	188,565	4.9	48.3		26.0	8.8	1.0	10.5			53.2	45.4
1976	92.2	196,183	4.0	46.1		25.8	9.8	0.7	13.2			50.1	48.8
1979	91.2	195,704	4.9	47.7		20.2	8.6	0.8	17.2			52.5	46.1
1982	91.6	196,415	4.8	50.4	1.4	17.0	5.3	1.1	20.0			55.2	42.2
1985	89.8	192,892	4.8	49.4	1.4	13.5	12.1		18.6			54.2	44.3
1988	85.3	182,427	5.4	49.2	4.6	14.1	10.1	1.8	14.7			59.1	38.9
1991	86.4	184,819	4.6	42.9	2.6	10.7	7.5	6.3	17.9		7.0	47.5	42.4
1994	86.6	185,145	6.8	49.7	4.4	9.4	6.2	3.4	18.6		1.0	60.9	37.5
1998	81.0	169,723	14.1	41.1	4.1	6.4	4.0	10.7	18.4			59.2	39.5
2002	79.8	165,413	8.7	43.4	4.0	9.2	11.5	8.1	12.4	1.4		56.0	41.1
2006	81.3	168,426	6.4	42.0	3.9	10.0	6.0	5.8	20.9	2.9		52.3	42.7
2010	84.1	177,215	5.8	38.9	5.6	7.6	6.0	4.7	25.7	4.8		50.1	44.0
2014	86.0	182,077	5.2	39.1	5.2	7.4	4.1	4.0	19.6	12.6		49.5	35.2
2018	87.3	183,966	7.0	33.9	3.3	9.3	4.4	6.3	16.4	18.0		53.2	45.3
2022	85.2	184,607	5.0	34.6	3.6	6.3	3.7	5.8	17.1	22.8		49.5	49.4

== Municipalities ==
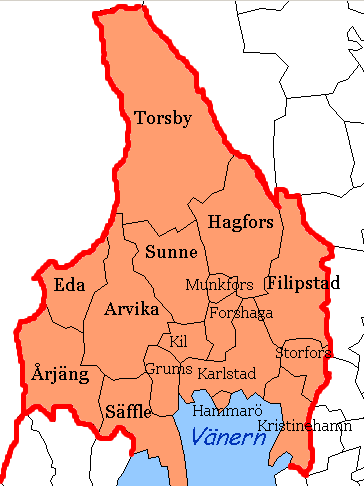

In Värmland Province:

- Arvika
- Eda
- Filipstad
- Forshaga
- Grums
- Hagfors
- Hammarö
- Karlstad
- Kil
- Kristinehamn
- Munkfors
- Storfors
- Sunne
- Säffle
- Torsby
- Årjäng

== Demographics ==
=== Foreign background ===
SCB have collected statistics on backgrounds of residents since 2002. These tables consist of all who have two foreign-born parents or are born abroad themselves. The chart lists election years and the last year on record alone.

Location	2002	2006	2010	2014	2018	2019
Arvika	8.8	10.4	11.8	13.0	14.9	15.1
Eda	20.7	23.8	26.1	27.7	31.1	31.7
Filipstad	8.6	10.1	12.1	16.4	22.8	22.5
Forshaga	6.0	7.0	7.3	8.8	11.0	10.8
Grums	8.1	8.8	9.8	11.0	13.0	13.5
Hagfors	6.2	7.8	9.7	12.2	15.6	16.1
Hammarö	7.0	7.0	7.4	7.6	9.1	8.9
Karlstad	9.5	11.0	12.8	14.0	16.8	17.6
Kil	6.4	6.9	7.3	8.2	9.0	9.5
Kristinehamn	8.3	9.6	11.1	14.2	17.1	17.5
Munkfors	5.3	6.9	8.3	10.5	16.5	16.3
Storfors	14.7	16.7	18.6	22.1	22.6	20.8
Sunne	4.8	5.5	6.6	8.4	11.5	11.6
Säffle	5.7	7.2	8.5	11.9	17.1	17.1
Torsby	6.7	8.3	10.3	12.2	14.1	14.7
Årjäng	15.0	17.4	19.4	21.7	24.8	25.5
Total	8.6	10.0	11.5	13.3	16.1	16.5
Source: SCB

== Climate ==
Värmland being a landlocked county results in greater temperature differences than at the nearby west coast of Sweden and south coast of Norway. As a result, the southern areas of the county has a humid continental climate with strong oceanic influences. The latter climate type is prevalent in a small area at the shores of Lake Vänern due to recent warming. More northerly areas see a subarctic climate with relatively mild winters for the climate type. The subarctic classification of areas such as Hagfors and Torsby is more due to the cool summer nights that renders September below 10 °C (50 °F) in mean temperatures.

Climate data for Karlstad, 2002-2015, extremes from 1901, precipitation 1961-1990
Month	Jan	Feb	Mar	Apr	May	Jun	Jul	Aug	Sep	Oct	Nov	Dec	Year
Record high °C (°F)	10.2 (50.4)	12.6 (54.7)	20.1 (68.2)	25.8 (78.4)	29.0 (84.2)	32.5 (90.5)	34.0 (93.2)	32.0 (89.6)	25.2 (77.4)	20.0 (68.0)	14.7 (58.5)	11.5 (52.7)	34.0 (93.2)
Mean daily maximum °C (°F)	−0.2 (31.6)	0.6 (33.1)	5.2 (41.4)	11.5 (52.7)	16.2 (61.2)	20.1 (68.2)	22.6 (72.7)	21.3 (70.3)	16.8 (62.2)	9.9 (49.8)	5.0 (41.0)	1.1 (34.0)	10.8 (51.4)
Daily mean °C (°F)	−2.6 (27.3)	−2.3 (27.9)	0.9 (33.6)	6.1 (43.0)	10.9 (51.6)	14.7 (58.5)	17.6 (63.7)	16.5 (61.7)	12.3 (54.1)	6.5 (43.7)	2.5 (36.5)	−1.6 (29.1)	6.7 (44.1)
Mean daily minimum °C (°F)	−5.1 (22.8)	−5.2 (22.6)	−3.3 (26.1)	0.8 (33.4)	5.6 (42.1)	9.4 (48.9)	12.7 (54.9)	11.7 (53.1)	7.7 (45.9)	3.1 (37.6)	0.1 (32.2)	−4.3 (24.3)	2.7 (36.9)
Record low °C (°F)	−32.5 (−26.5)	−36.0 (−32.8)	−26.9 (−16.4)	−18.4 (−1.1)	−5.0 (23.0)	−1.8 (28.8)	3.5 (38.3)	1.0 (33.8)	−5.0 (23.0)	−12.0 (10.4)	−19.9 (−3.8)	−28.0 (−18.4)	−36.0 (−32.8)
Average precipitation mm (inches)	46.1 (1.81)	32.8 (1.29)	38.8 (1.53)	39.0 (1.54)	43.9 (1.73)	56.3 (2.22)	65.4 (2.57)	76.1 (3.00)	73.0 (2.87)	70.7 (2.78)	72.6 (2.86)	50.7 (2.00)	665.3 (26.19)
Mean monthly sunshine hours	47	70	174	220	254	287	265	223	181	103	48	44	1,916
Source 1:
Source 2:

Climate data for Arvika (roughly 50 km north of Karlstad) — Extremes 1945-present, precipitation 1961-1990
Month	Jan	Feb	Mar	Apr	May	Jun	Jul	Aug	Sep	Oct	Nov	Dec	Year
Record high °C (°F)	10.2 (50.4)	11.8 (53.2)	20.4 (68.7)	25.5 (77.9)	29.8 (85.6)	33.8 (92.8)	32.8 (91.0)	33.9 (93.0)	28.0 (82.4)	20.4 (68.7)	15.2 (59.4)	13.0 (55.4)	33.9 (93.0)
Mean daily maximum °C (°F)	−0.6 (30.9)	0.5 (32.9)	5.6 (42.1)	11.8 (53.2)	16.6 (61.9)	20.7 (69.3)	22.9 (73.2)	21.4 (70.5)	16.9 (62.4)	9.9 (49.8)	4.9 (40.8)	0.3 (32.5)	10.9 (51.6)
Daily mean °C (°F)	−4.4 (24.1)	−3.8 (25.2)	−0.2 (31.6)	5.4 (41.7)	10.2 (50.4)	14.2 (57.6)	16.9 (62.4)	15.4 (59.7)	11.0 (51.8)	5.3 (41.5)	1.6 (34.9)	−3.3 (26.1)	5.6 (42.1)
Mean daily minimum °C (°F)	−8.2 (17.2)	−8.2 (17.2)	−6.0 (21.2)	−0.9 (30.4)	3.8 (38.8)	7.7 (45.9)	10.8 (51.4)	9.5 (49.1)	5.1 (41.2)	0.8 (33.4)	−1.7 (28.9)	−7.0 (19.4)	0.4 (32.7)
Record low °C (°F)	−35.5 (−31.9)	−38.0 (−36.4)	−30.0 (−22.0)	−16.0 (3.2)	−6.7 (19.9)	−3.4 (25.9)	1.2 (34.2)	−1.9 (28.6)	−7.0 (19.4)	−14.5 (5.9)	−24.0 (−11.2)	−31.9 (−25.4)	−38.0 (−36.4)
Average precipitation mm (inches)	43.5 (1.71)	30.8 (1.21)	31.5 (1.24)	37.6 (1.48)	44.6 (1.76)	62.0 (2.44)	71.6 (2.82)	80.8 (3.18)	73.5 (2.89)	71.5 (2.81)	64.3 (2.53)	44.5 (1.75)	656.0 (25.83)
Source 1:
Source 2:

Climate data for Blomskog (southerly near Norwegian border) (2002-2015 temp averages, 1964-1990 precipitation, extremes since 1964)
Month	Jan	Feb	Mar	Apr	May	Jun	Jul	Aug	Sep	Oct	Nov	Dec	Year
Record high °C (°F)	10.0 (50.0)	12.7 (54.9)	20.0 (68.0)	26.6 (79.9)	28.6 (83.5)	31.1 (88.0)	32.7 (90.9)	32.9 (91.2)	25.6 (78.1)	20.0 (68.0)	13.8 (56.8)	10.0 (50.0)	32.9 (91.2)
Mean daily maximum °C (°F)	0.0 (32.0)	0.4 (32.7)	4.7 (40.5)	10.8 (51.4)	15.3 (59.5)	19.2 (66.6)	21.5 (70.7)	20.2 (68.4)	15.9 (60.6)	9.5 (49.1)	4.8 (40.6)	0.9 (33.6)	10.2 (50.4)
Daily mean °C (°F)	−2.7 (27.1)	−2.6 (27.3)	0.4 (32.7)	5.5 (41.9)	10.0 (50.0)	13.7 (56.7)	16.5 (61.7)	15.5 (59.9)	11.9 (53.4)	6.1 (43.0)	2.2 (36.0)	−1.8 (28.8)	6.2 (43.2)
Mean daily minimum °C (°F)	−5.3 (22.5)	−5.7 (21.7)	−3.8 (25.2)	0.2 (32.4)	4.7 (40.5)	8.3 (46.9)	11.5 (52.7)	10.8 (51.4)	6.9 (44.4)	2.7 (36.9)	−0.3 (31.5)	−4.6 (23.7)	2.1 (35.8)
Record low °C (°F)	−32.4 (−26.3)	−36.5 (−33.7)	−27.0 (−16.6)	−15.3 (4.5)	−5.6 (21.9)	−2.7 (27.1)	0.9 (33.6)	−2.0 (28.4)	−6.8 (19.8)	−14.2 (6.4)	−25.4 (−13.7)	−30.3 (−22.5)	−36.5 (−33.7)
Average precipitation mm (inches)	52.2 (2.06)	37.1 (1.46)	41.4 (1.63)	38.1 (1.50)	42.6 (1.68)	55.9 (2.20)	59.3 (2.33)	70.1 (2.76)	76.3 (3.00)	78.8 (3.10)	72.4 (2.85)	52.1 (2.05)	676.5 (26.63)
Source 1: SMHI Precipitation normals 1961-1990
Source 2: SMHI average data 2002-2015

Climate data for Gustavsfors (central Värmland) (2002-2015 temp averages, 1961-1990 precipitation, extremes since 1917)
Month	Jan	Feb	Mar	Apr	May	Jun	Jul	Aug	Sep	Oct	Nov	Dec	Year
Record high °C (°F)	8.8 (47.8)	11.3 (52.3)	17.7 (63.9)	25.2 (77.4)	28.5 (83.3)	33.4 (92.1)	33.4 (92.1)	34.4 (93.9)	27.2 (81.0)	20.2 (68.4)	13.1 (55.6)	9.8 (49.6)	34.4 (93.9)
Mean daily maximum °C (°F)	−1.9 (28.6)	−0.6 (30.9)	3.4 (38.1)	10.7 (51.3)	15.4 (59.7)	19.6 (67.3)	22.0 (71.6)	20.3 (68.5)	15.6 (60.1)	8.5 (47.3)	3.4 (38.1)	−1.3 (29.7)	8.7 (47.7)
Daily mean °C (°F)	−5.8 (21.6)	−5.2 (22.6)	−2.0 (28.4)	4.3 (39.7)	9.0 (48.2)	12.9 (55.2)	15.8 (60.4)	14.4 (57.9)	9.8 (49.6)	4.3 (39.7)	0.2 (32.4)	−4.9 (23.2)	4.4 (39.9)
Mean daily minimum °C (°F)	−9.6 (14.7)	−9.6 (14.7)	−7.4 (18.7)	−2.2 (28.0)	2.7 (36.9)	6.3 (43.3)	9.6 (49.3)	8.4 (47.1)	3.9 (39.0)	0.0 (32.0)	−3.0 (26.6)	−8.5 (16.7)	−0.7 (30.7)
Record low °C (°F)	−42.0 (−43.6)	−38.0 (−36.4)	−31.7 (−25.1)	−26.6 (−15.9)	−9.4 (15.1)	−3.9 (25.0)	−0.9 (30.4)	−3.4 (25.9)	−8.2 (17.2)	−17.6 (0.3)	−27.9 (−18.2)	−35.4 (−31.7)	−42.0 (−43.6)
Average precipitation mm (inches)	41.7 (1.64)	29.4 (1.16)	34.6 (1.36)	39.3 (1.55)	48.2 (1.90)	68.0 (2.68)	79.9 (3.15)	80.2 (3.16)	75.6 (2.98)	65.2 (2.57)	62.3 (2.45)	47.0 (1.85)	671.3 (26.43)
Source 1: SMHI Precipitation normals 1961-1990
Source 2: SMHI average data Jan 2002 - Dec 2015

== Heraldry ==
The county of Värmland inherited its coat of arms from the province of the same name. When it is shown with a royal crown it represents the County Administrative Board. Blazon: "Argent, an Eagle displayed Azure beaked, langued and membered Gules."

== See also ==
- Duke of Värmland, a title for members of the royal family (see Duchies in Sweden)
  The title is presently held by Prince Carl Philip, Duke of Värmland
- Egenäs
