= Bengtsfors =

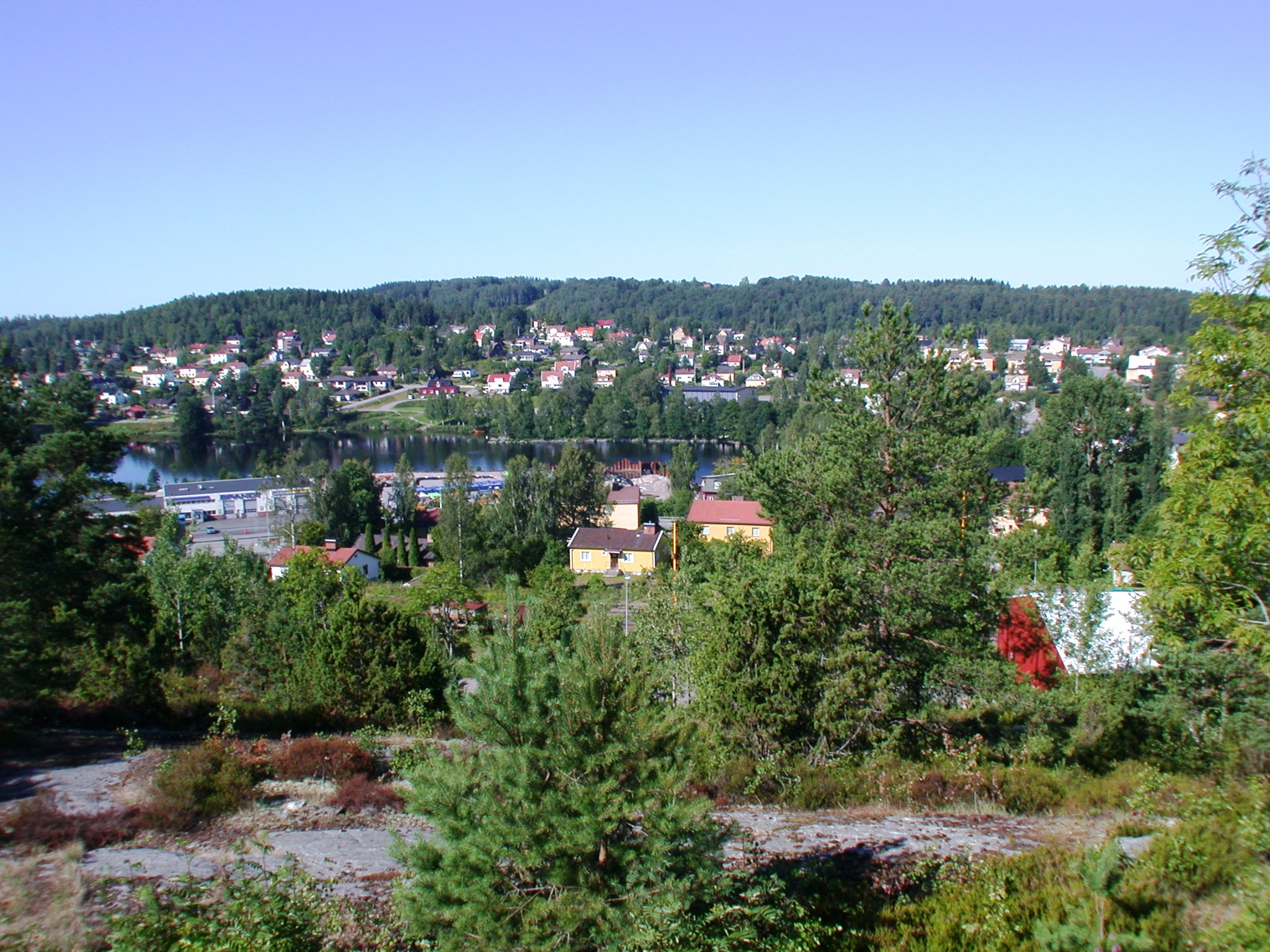
- View over Bengtsfors

- Location within Västra Götaland Location within Sweden
- Coordinates: 59°01′45″N 12°13′35″E
- Country: Sweden
- Province: Dalsland
- County: Västra Götaland County
- Municipality: Bengtsfors Municipality

Area
  - Total: 3.27 km^{2} (1.26 sq mi)

Population (31 December 2010)
  - Total: 3,080
  - Density: 942/km^{2} (2,440/sq mi)
- Time zone: UTC+1 (CET)
  - Summer (DST): UTC+2 (CEST)
- Climate: Dfb

Bengtsfors (Swedish pronunciation: [ˈbɛ̂ŋtsfɔʂ]) is a locality and the seat of Bengtsfors Municipality, Västra Götaland County, Sweden. It had 3,080 inhabitants in 2010. Bengtsfors Church is in Bengtsfors.
