= List of national parks of Sweden =

National parks of Sweden

National parks of Sweden (clickable map)

National parks of Sweden are managed by the Swedish Environmental Protection Agency (EPA) (Swedish: Naturvårdsverket) and owned by the state. The goal of the national park service is to create a system of protected areas that represent all the distinct natural regions of the country. In 1909, Sweden became the first country in Europe to establish such parks when nine were opened following the Riksdag passing of a law on national parks that year. This was followed by the establishment of seven parks between 1918 and 1962 and thirteen between 1982 and 2009, with the latest being Åsnen National Park in 2018. As of 2020 there are 30 national parks in Sweden, comprising a total area of 743,238 hectares (1,836,580 acres).

According to the EPA, Swedish national parks must represent unique landscape types and be effectively protected and used for research, recreation, and tourism without damaging nature. Mountain terrain dominates approximatively 90% of the parks' combined area. The reason for this is the extensive mountain areas taken up by the large northern parks—Sarek National Park and Padjelanta National Park each cover approximately 200,000 hectares (490,000 acres). Many of the northern parks are part of the Laponian area, one of Sweden's UNESCO World Heritage Sites due to its preserved natural landscape and habitat for the native reindeer-herding Sami people. The southernmost parks—Söderåsen National Park, Dalby Söderskog National Park and Stenshuvud National Park—are covered with broadleaf forest and together cover approximately 2,000 ha (4,942 acres). Fulufjället National Park is part of PAN Parks, a network founded by the World Wildlife Fund (WWF) to provide better long-term conservation and tourism management of European national parks.

== National parks ==
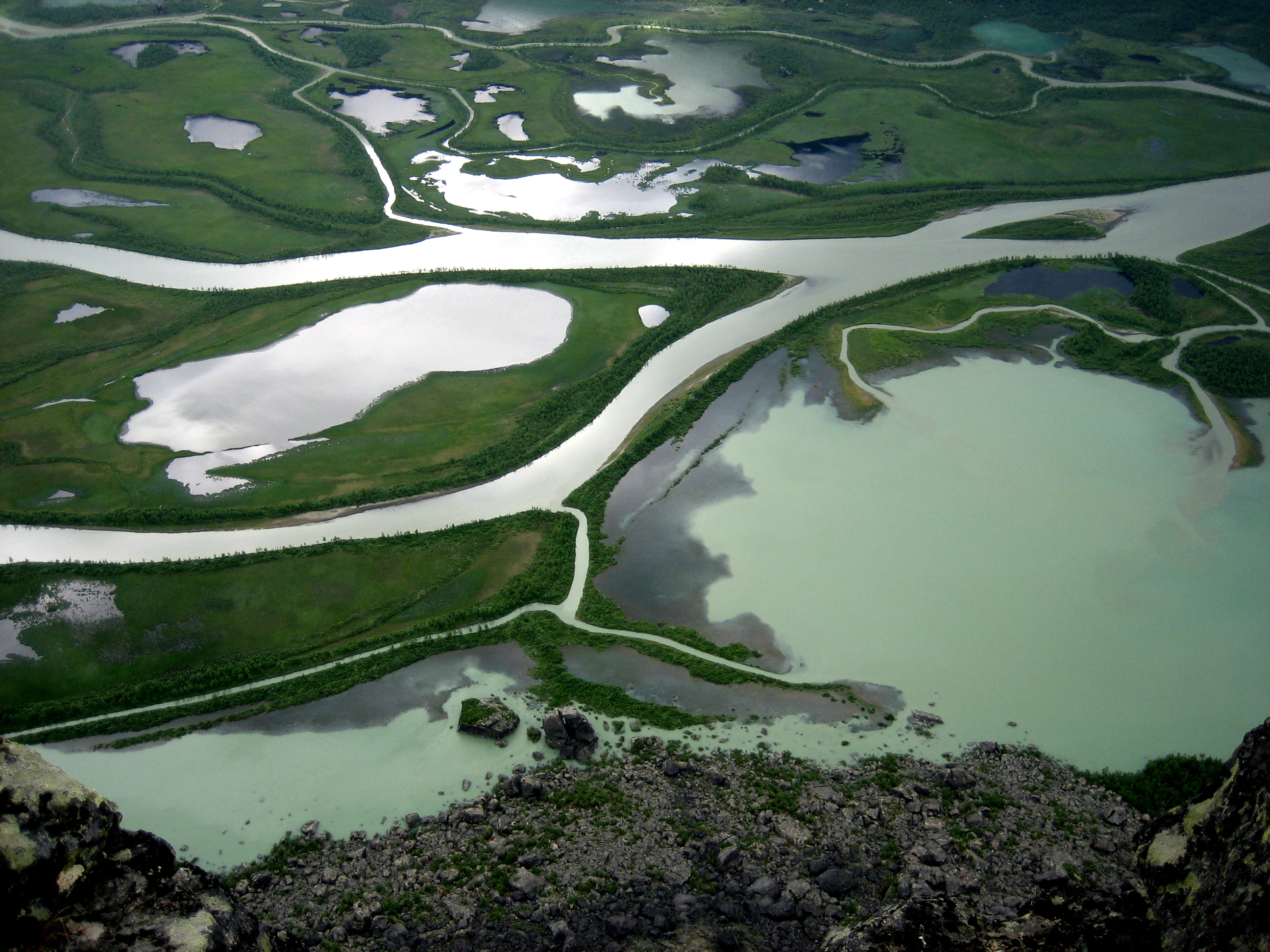
A river delta near Sarek National Park

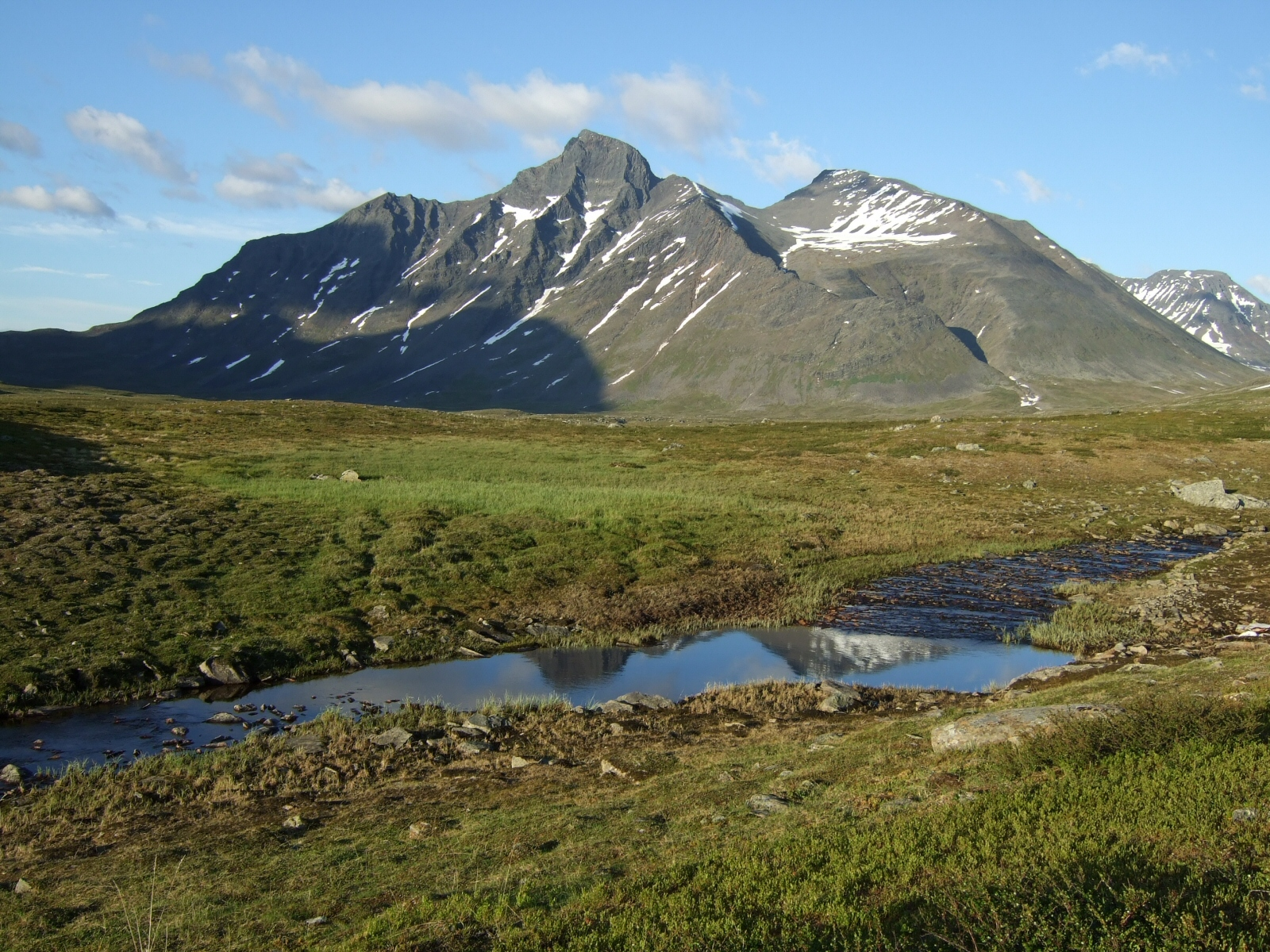
Pierikpakte Mountain, part of Sarek National Park

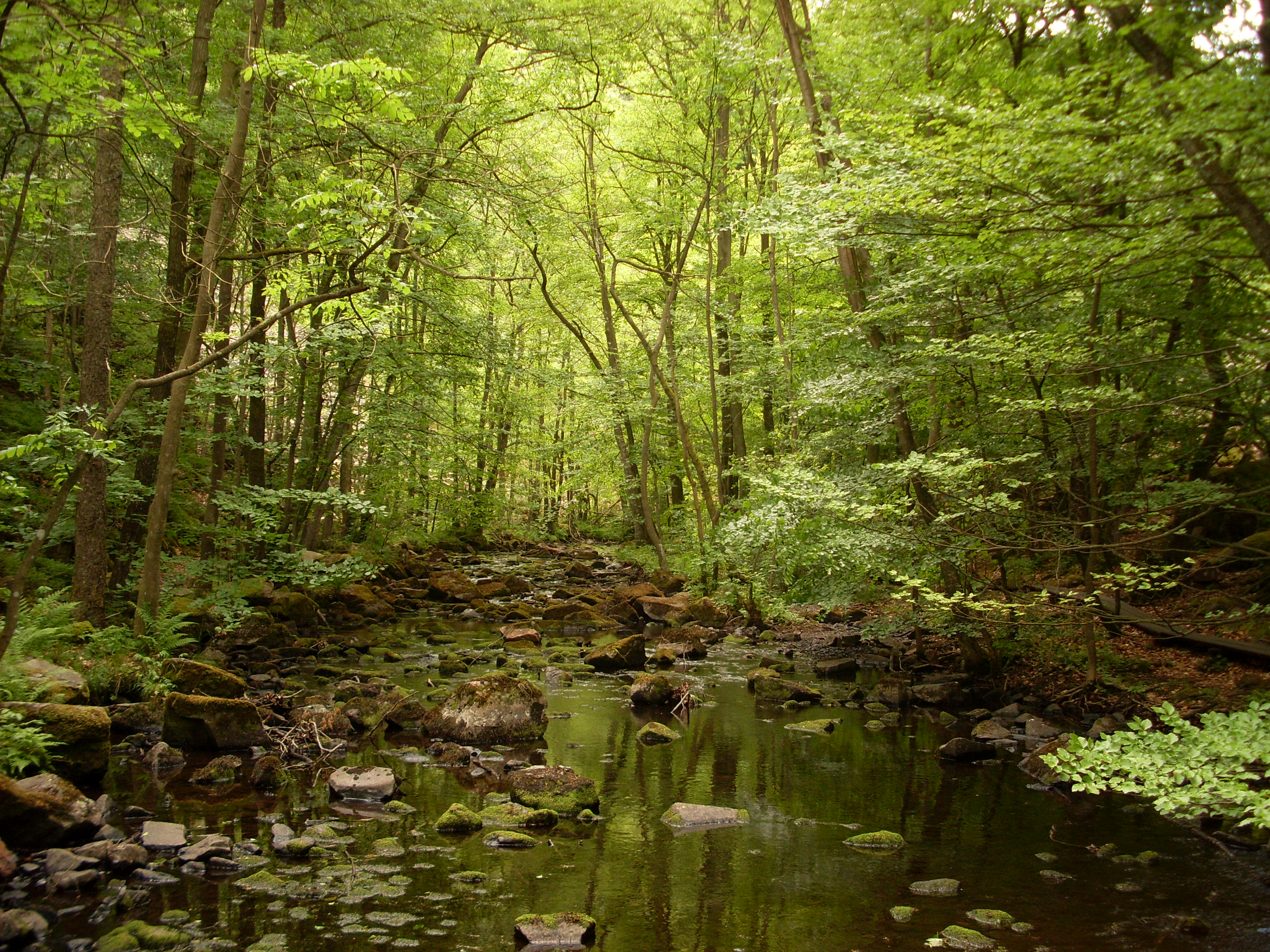
Skäralid River, part of Söderåsen National Park

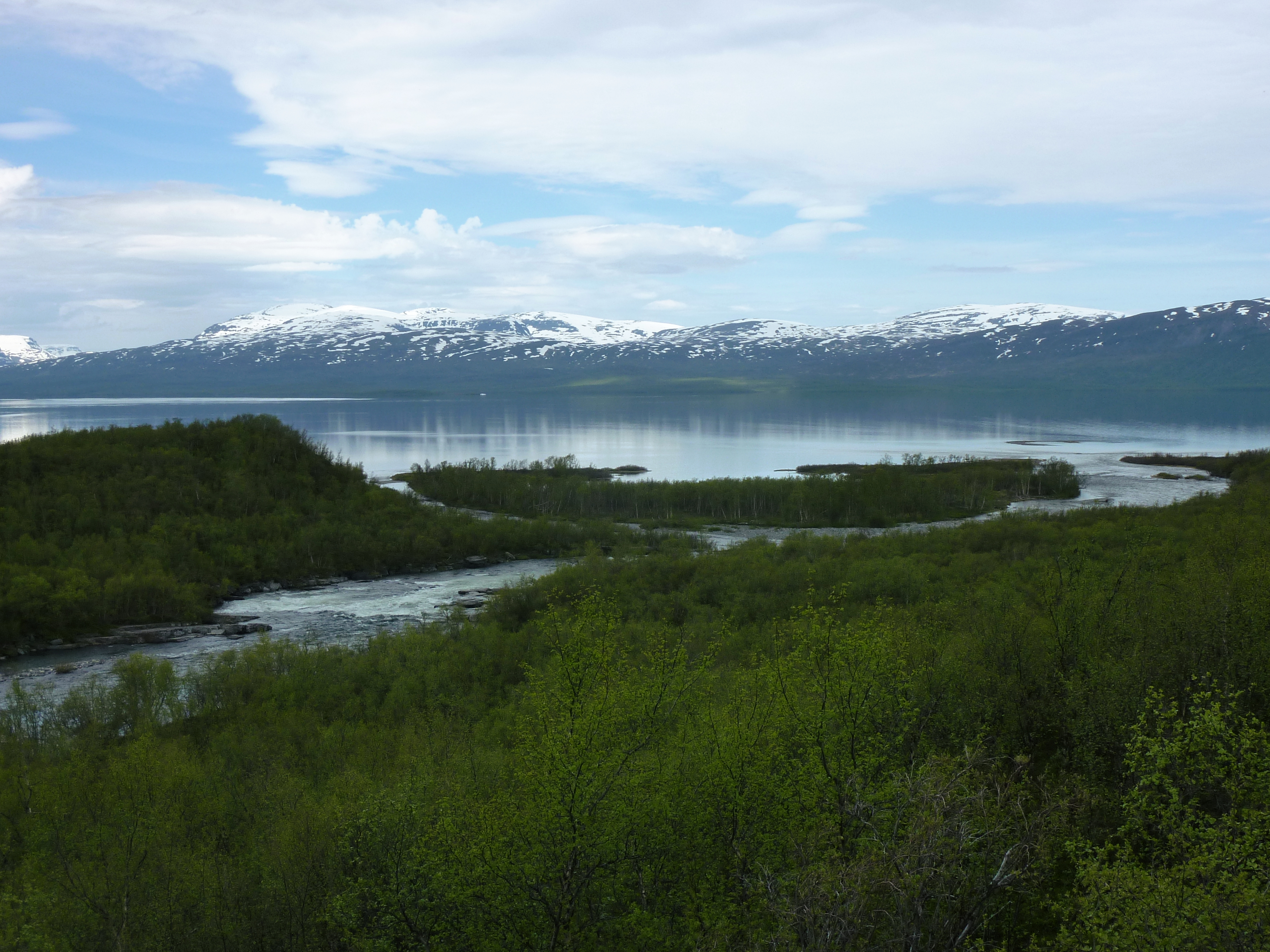
Abisko National Park was established in 1909.

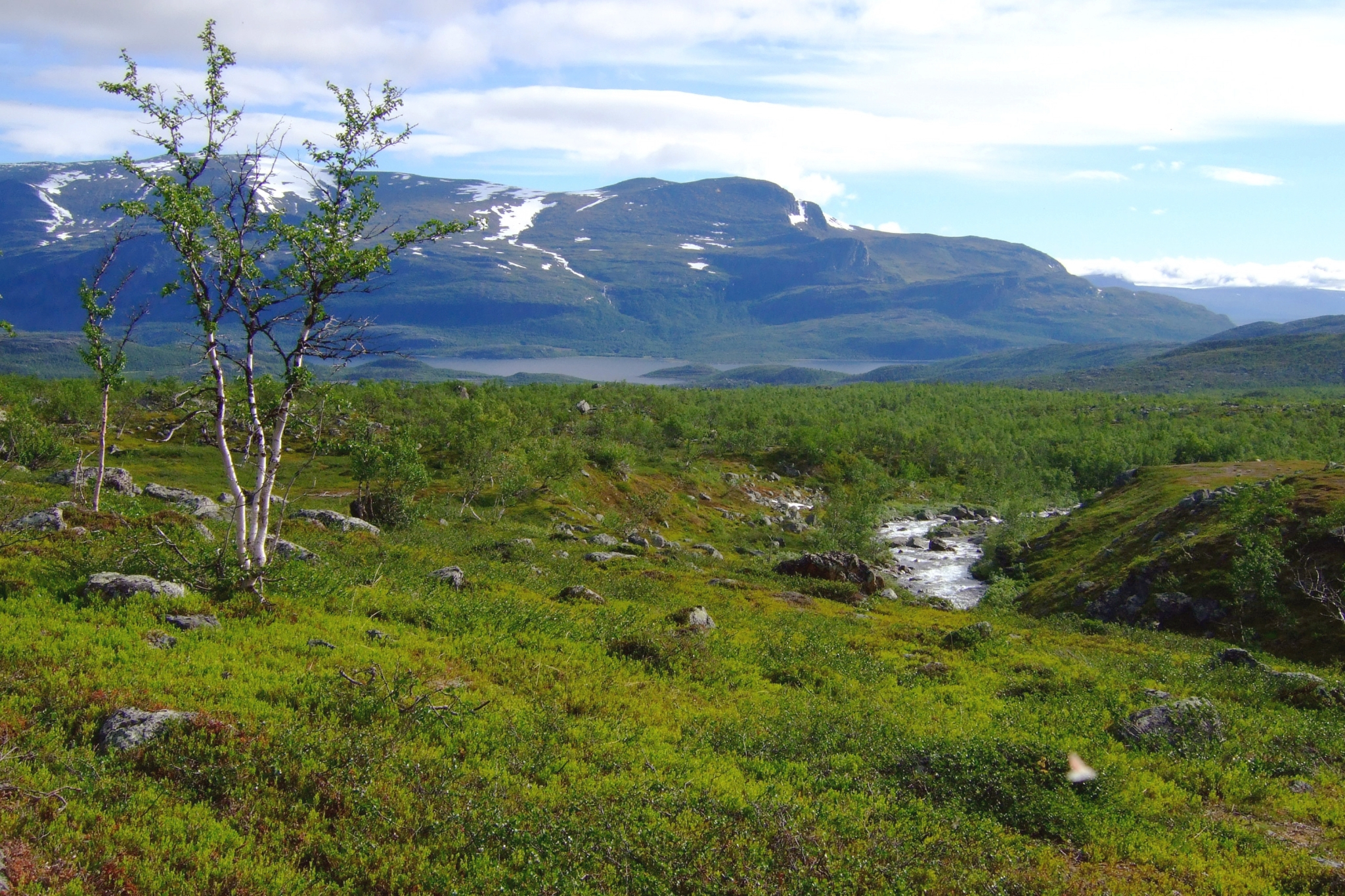
Stream just over the tree line in Stora Sjöfallet National Park.

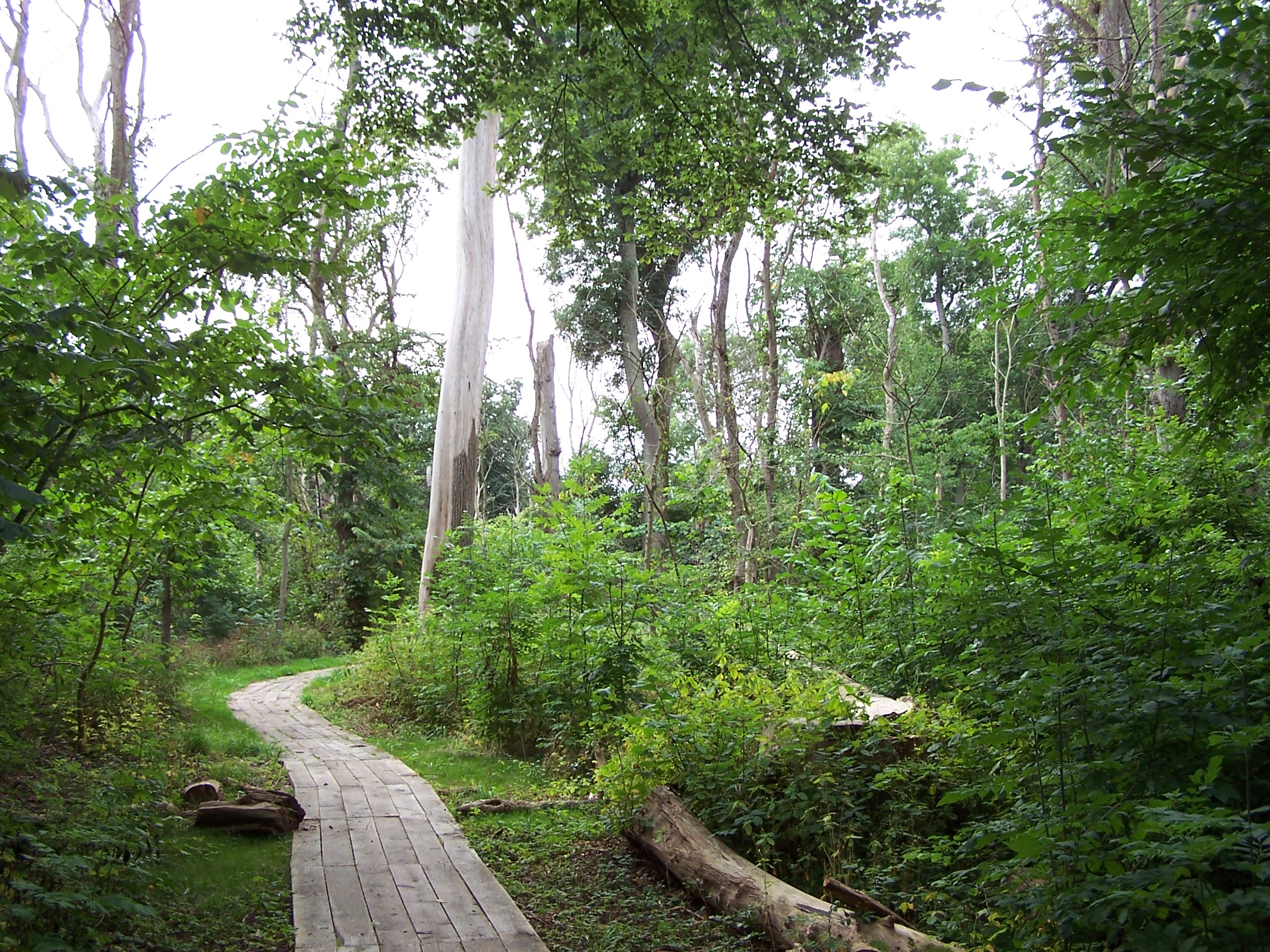
The forest in Dalby Söderskog National Park

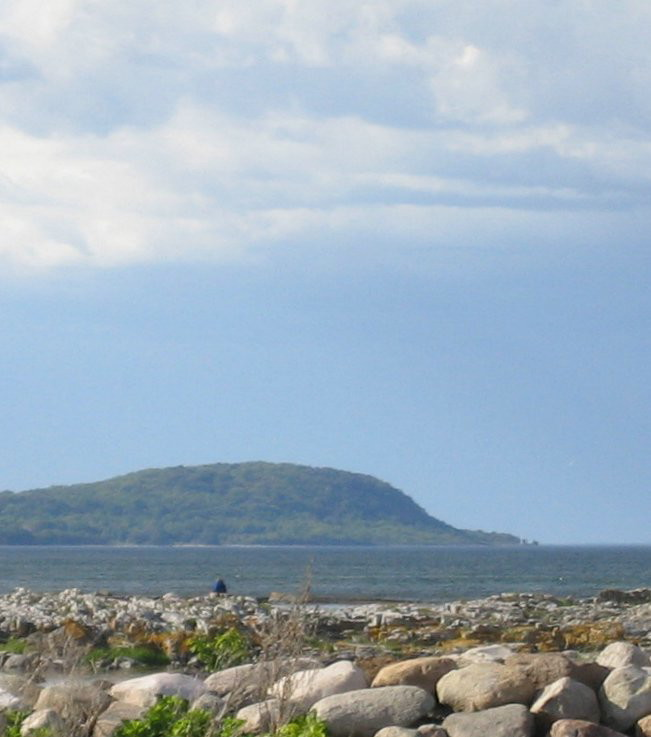
The hill Stenshuvud in Stenshuvud National Park

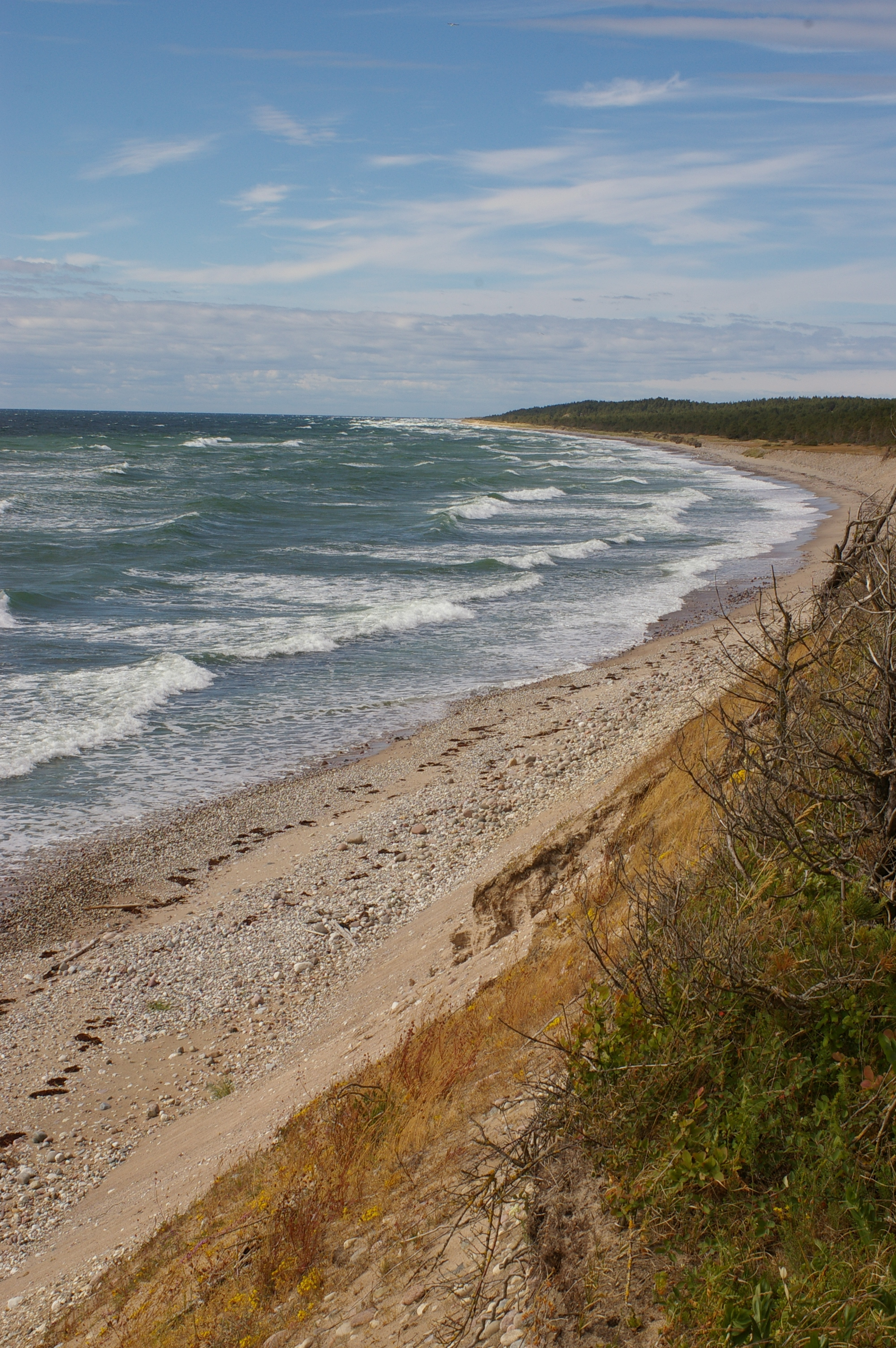
Gotska Sandön National Park is one of Sweden's oldest national parks.

This along with * indicates that the national park is part of a World Heritage Site
This along with ** indicates that the national park is a Protected Area Network Park

Name	Location	Area	Established	Description	Coordinates
Abisko National Park	Norrbotten County	7,700 ha (19,027 acres)	1909	The park is composed of valleys framed by mountain ranges in the south and west and Scandinavia's largest alpine lake, Torneträsk, in the north.	68.316667°N 18.683333°E
Ängsö National Park	Stockholm County	168 ha (415 acres)	1909	Ängsö is an island in the Stockholm archipelago. The park is known for its "ancient farm landscape in the archipelago environment, the spring flowers, and the varied bird life".	59.633333°N 18.766667°E
Åsnen National Park	Kronoberg County	1,873 ha (4,628 acres)	2018	Lacustrine archipelago, covered with a virgin forest. Rich animal and plant life, whether in the aquatic or terrestrial part.	56.64°N 14.66°E
Björnlandet National Park	Västerbotten County	1,100 ha (2,718 acres)	1991	Björnlandet's geography is distinguished by its large virgin forest and mountain terrain with steep ravines and cliffs. The park features traces of several forest fires.	63.966667°N 18.016667°E
Blå Jungfrun National Park	Kalmar County	198 ha (489 acres)	1926	Blå Jungfrun is an island in the Baltic Sea dominated by clefts and hollows in the north and forest in the south.	57.266667°N 16.783333°E
Dalby Söderskog National Park	Skåne County	36 ha (89 acres)	1918	Deciduous forest surrounded by a 56-metre-wide (184 ft) earth bank that takes up a large part of the park.	55.666667°N 13.316667°E
Djurö National Park	Västra Götaland County	2,400 ha (5,931 acres)	1991	Djurö National Park consists of an archipelago with about 30 islands in Sweden's biggest lake, Vänern.	58.85°N 13.466667°E
Färnebofjärden National Park	Dalarna, Gävleborg, Uppsala, and Västmanland counties	10,100 ha (24,958 acres)	1998	Dalälven River passes through the park and the uneven shoreline encloses over 200 islands and islets.	60.183333°N 16.766667°E
Fulufjället National Park**	Dalarna County	38,500 ha (95,136 acres)	2002	The park consists mainly of bare mountain heights, and heaths that are unique in the Swedish mountains.	61.583333°N 12.666667°E
Garphyttan National Park	Örebro County	111 ha (274 acres)	1909	Garphyttan National Park consists of landscape altered by humans through agriculture and forestry, such as meadows and deciduous forest.	59.167°N 14.53°E
Gotska Sandön National Park	Gotland County	4,490 ha (11,095 acres)	1909	Gotska Sandön is an island composed of sand. Its scenery is dominated by beaches, dunes, and pine forests.	58.366667°N 19.25°E
Hamra National Park	Gävleborg County	28 ha (69 acres)	1909	Hamra National Park contains two low moraine hills covered with virgin forest and large rock boulders.	61.766667°N 14.75°E
Haparanda Archipelago National Park	Norrbotten County	6,000 ha (14,826 acres)	1995	Located in the northern part of the Gulf of Bothnia, the park is composed of low islands with wide sandy beaches.	65.566667°N 23.733333°E
Kosterhavet National Park	Västra Götaland County	38,878 ha (96,070 acres)	2009	Kosterhavet National Park is the first national marine park of Sweden and was inaugurated in September 2009. It consists of the sea and shores around the Koster Islands, however excluding the islands themselves.	58.85°N 11.02°E
Muddus National Park*	Norrbotten County	49,340 ha (121,922 acres)	1942	Muddus National Park is home of deep ravines and primeval forests. Sweden's oldest pine tree is located in the park.	66.9°N 20.166667°E
Norra Kvill National Park	Kalmar County	114 ha (282 acres)	1927	Norra Kvill is an ancient forest with tall pine trees that are over 350 years old. Three lakes are situated in the park: Stora Idegölen, Lilla Idegölen and Dalskärret.	57.766667°N 15.583333°E
Padjelanta National Park*	Norrbotten County	198,400 ha (490,257 acres)	1962	The park, which borders Norway in the west, is primarily composed of a flat and open landscape that surrounds the two lakes Vastenjávrre and Virihávrre.	67.366667°N 16.8°E
Pieljekaise National Park	Norrbotten County	15,340 ha (37,906 acres)	1909	Pieljekaise National Park is composed of birch forest, mountain terrain, and several lakes. The park is named after Pieljekaise Mountain, a landmark in the area.	66.333333°N 16.733333°E
Sånfjället National Park	Jämtland County	10,300 ha (25,452 acres)	1909	The park is named after the 1,278-metre-high (4,193 ft) mountain Sånfjället. The mountainous area is intersected by streaming lakes and a forest area.	62.283333°N 13.533333°E
Sarek National Park*	Norrbotten County	197,000 ha (486,798 acres)	1909	The park features an alpine landscape with high peaks and narrow valleys. More than 100 glaciers are found in the park, and several mountains are over 2,000 m (6,600 ft) high.	67.283333°N 17.7°E
Skuleskogen National Park*	Västernorrland County	2,360 ha (5,832 acres)	1984	Skuleskogen National Park is composed of ancient forest, high mountains, and sea coast. The mountain peaks are covered with pine forest and are separated by valleys formed by the sea and ice sheets.	63.116667°N 18.5°E
Söderåsen National Park	Skåne County	1,625 ha (4,015 acres)	2001	The park features an especially contoured landscape with up to 90-metre-deep (300 ft) ravines. The valleys are covered with broadleaf forest, mostly beech.	56.016667°N 13.216667°E
Stenshuvud National Park	Skåne County	390 ha (964 acres)	1986	Stenshuvud is a hill that faces the Baltic Sea. Because the surrounding landscape is relatively flat, it can be seen from a great distance and has been used by seafarers as an aid to navigation at sea. Most of the area is covered with broadleaf forest.	55.666667°N 14.266667°E
Stora Sjöfallet National Park*	Norrbotten County	127,800 ha (315,801 acres)	1909	The park's northern portions lie in the Scandinavian Mountains, home to some of Sweden's highest peaks. The lower hills in the park's southern part are covered with forest.	67.483333°N 18.35°E
Store Mosse National Park	Jönköping County	7,850 ha (19,398 acres)	1989	Store Mosse National Park is the home of the largest bog area in southern Sweden. The lake Kävsjön, containing many species of birds, is located within the park.	57.266667°N 13.916667°E
Tiveden National Park	Örebro County and Västra Götaland counties	1,350 ha (3,336 acres)	1983	Tiveden National Park is a part of the large Tiveden forest. The park is situated in the most inaccessible part of the forest. The landscape is mountainous and stony.	58.716667°N 14.6°E
Töfsingdalen National Park	Dalarna County	1,615 ha (3,991 acres)	1930	Töfsingdalen National Park consists of two mountain ridges separated by a valley covered with fields and virgin forest.	62.166667°N 12.433333°E
Tresticklan National Park	Västra Götaland County	2,897 ha (7,159 acres)	1996	This park contains a rift valley landscape and is one of the few remaining areas of pristine forest in southern Scandinavia.	59.033333°N 11.75°E
Tyresta National Park	Stockholm County	2,000 ha (4,942 acres)	1993	Tyresta is a gorge landscape with stony slopes. The park, covered with pine forest, is one of the largest virgin forests in Sweden.	59.183333°N 18.3°E
Vadvetjåkka National Park	Norrbotten County	2,630 ha (6,499 acres)	1920	Located in a mountain region north-west of Lake Torneträsk, Vadvetjåkka National Park is the northernmost national park in Sweden. The park is named after Vadvetjåkka Mountain, which is located within the park.	68.55°N 18.4°E

== Future national parks ==
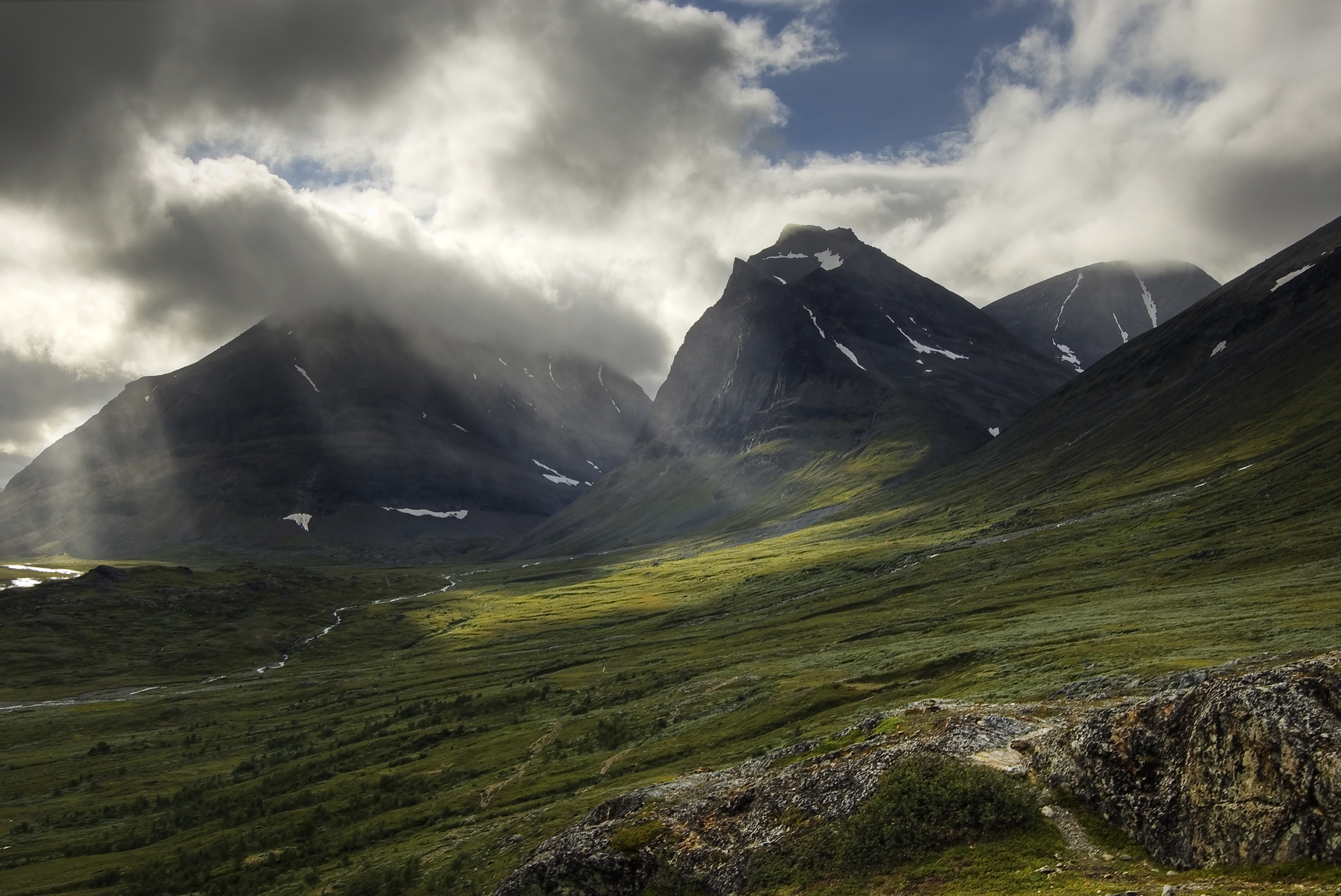
Sweden's highest mountain Kebnekaise will be part of a national park sometime between 2009 and 2013.

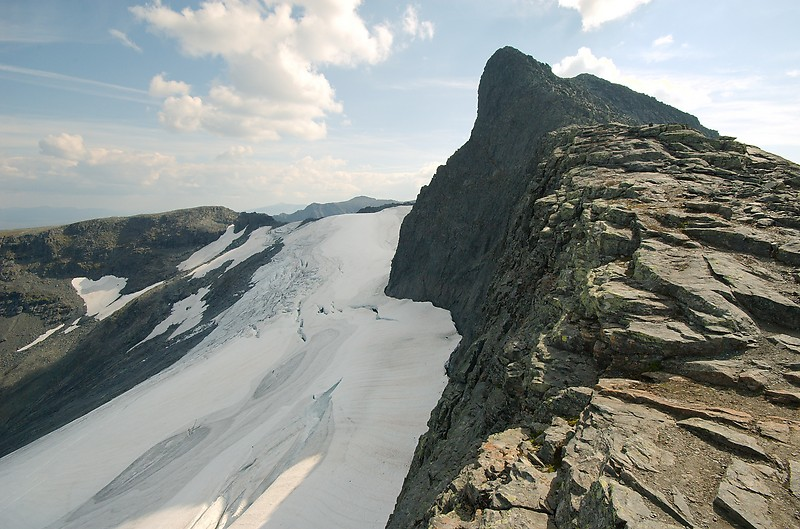
The Sylan mountain range will be part of the Vålådalen-Sylarna National Park.

In 2008, after investigations and interviews with the participating counties, the Swedish Environmental Protection Agency laid down a plan to establish 13 new national parks in the near future. According to the plan, seven of the parks will be established between 2009 and 2013, the first being Kosterhavet National Park which was inaugurated in September 2009. It is currently unknown when the six remaining parks will be established.

Name	Location	Area	Date of establishment
Bästeträsk National Park	Gotland County	5,000 ha (12,355 acres)	2009–2013
Blaikfjället National Park	Västerbotten County	40,000 ha (98,842 acres)	2009–2013
Kebnekaise National Park	Norrbotten County	65,000 ha (160,618 acres)	2009–2013
Tavvavuoma National Park	Norrbotten County	40,000 ha (98,842 acres)	2009–2013
Vålådalen-Sylarna National Park	Jämtland County	230,000 ha (568,342 acres)	2009–2013
Nämdöskärgården National Park	Stockholm County	14,000 ha (34,595 acres)	TBA
Koppången National Park	Dalarna County	5,000 ha (12,355 acres)	TBA
Reivo National Park	Norrbotten County	11,000 ha (27,182 acres)	TBA
Rogen-Juttulslätten National Park	Dalarna County and Jämtland County	100,000 ha (247,105 acres)	TBA
Sankt Anna National Park	Östergötland County	10,000 ha (24,711 acres)	TBA
Vindelfjällen National Park	Västerbotten County	550,000 ha (1,359,080 acres)	TBA

== See also ==
- List of World Heritage Sites in Sweden
