= Vedbo =

Vedbo may refer to any of three hundreds (administrative divisions) in Sweden:

- Vedbo Hundred, a hundred of Dalsland in Sweden
- Vedbo Northern Hundred, a hundred divided between Småland and Östergötland in Sweden
- Vedbo Southern Hundred, a hundred of Småland in Sweden

== See also ==
- List of hundreds of Sweden
