= Ed, Sweden =

Ed
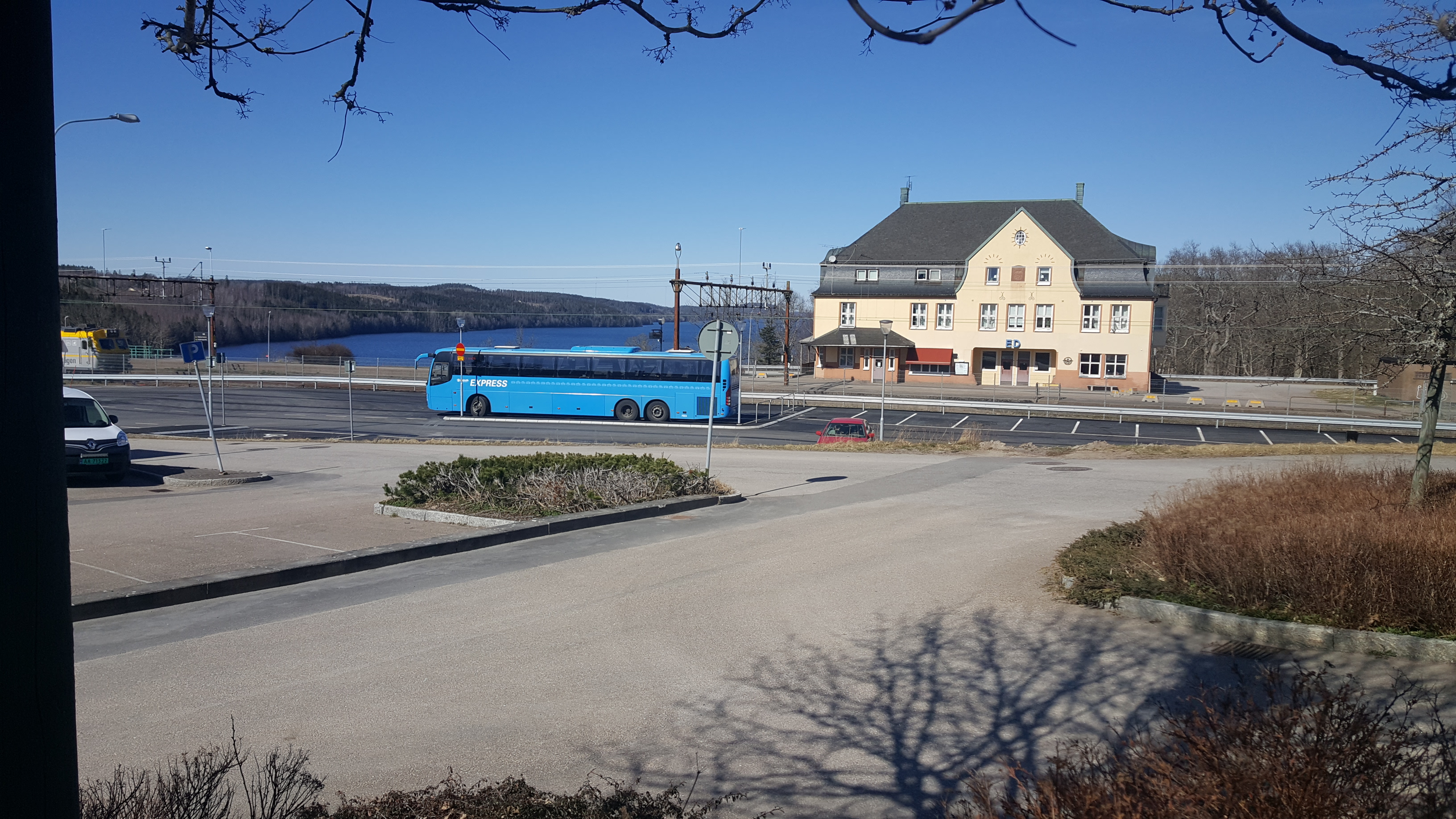

- Location within Västra Götaland Location within Sweden
- Coordinates: 58°55′N 11°55′E
- Country: Sweden
- Province: Dalsland
- County: Västra Götaland County
- Municipality: Dals-Ed

Area
  - Total: 3.82 km^{2} (1.47 sq mi)

Population (31 December 2010)
  - Total: 2,932
  - Density: 768/km^{2} (1,990/sq mi)
- Time zone: UTC+1 (CET)
  - Summer (DST): UTC+2 (CEST)
- Climate: Dfb

Ed is a locality and the seat of Dals-Ed Municipality in Västra Götaland County, Sweden. It had 2,932 inhabitants in 2010. It is the only locality in the municipality.

Ed has a station on the railway line between Gothenburg and Oslo, Norway.
