= Dalboredden =

Coordinates: 59°11′15″N 12°31′15″E

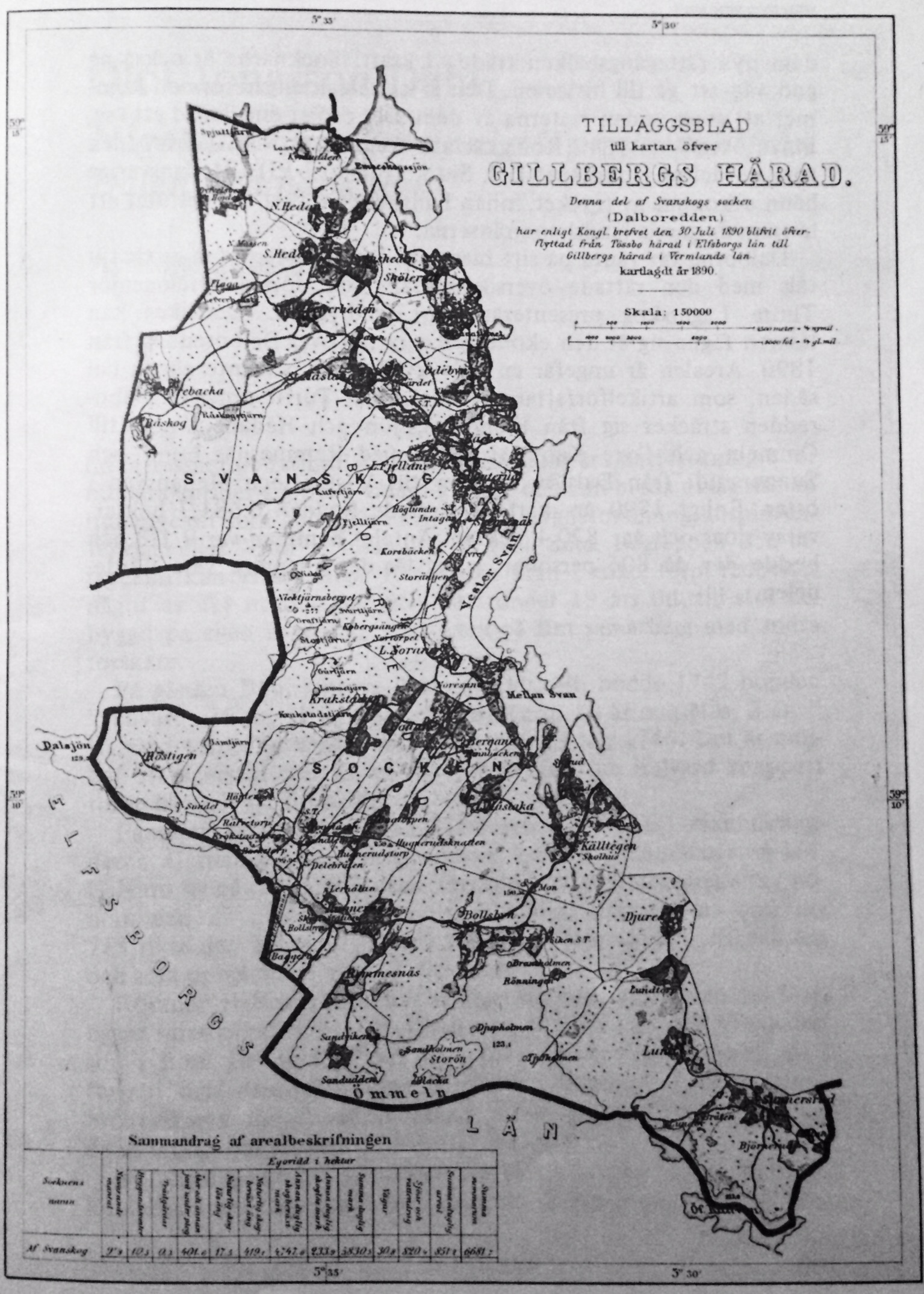

Dalboredden is the northernmost part of the Swedish province Dalsland. It is the only part of the former province which is in Värmland County rather than in Västra Götaland County.
