= Stenshuvud National Park =

National park in Sweden

- IUCN category II (national park)
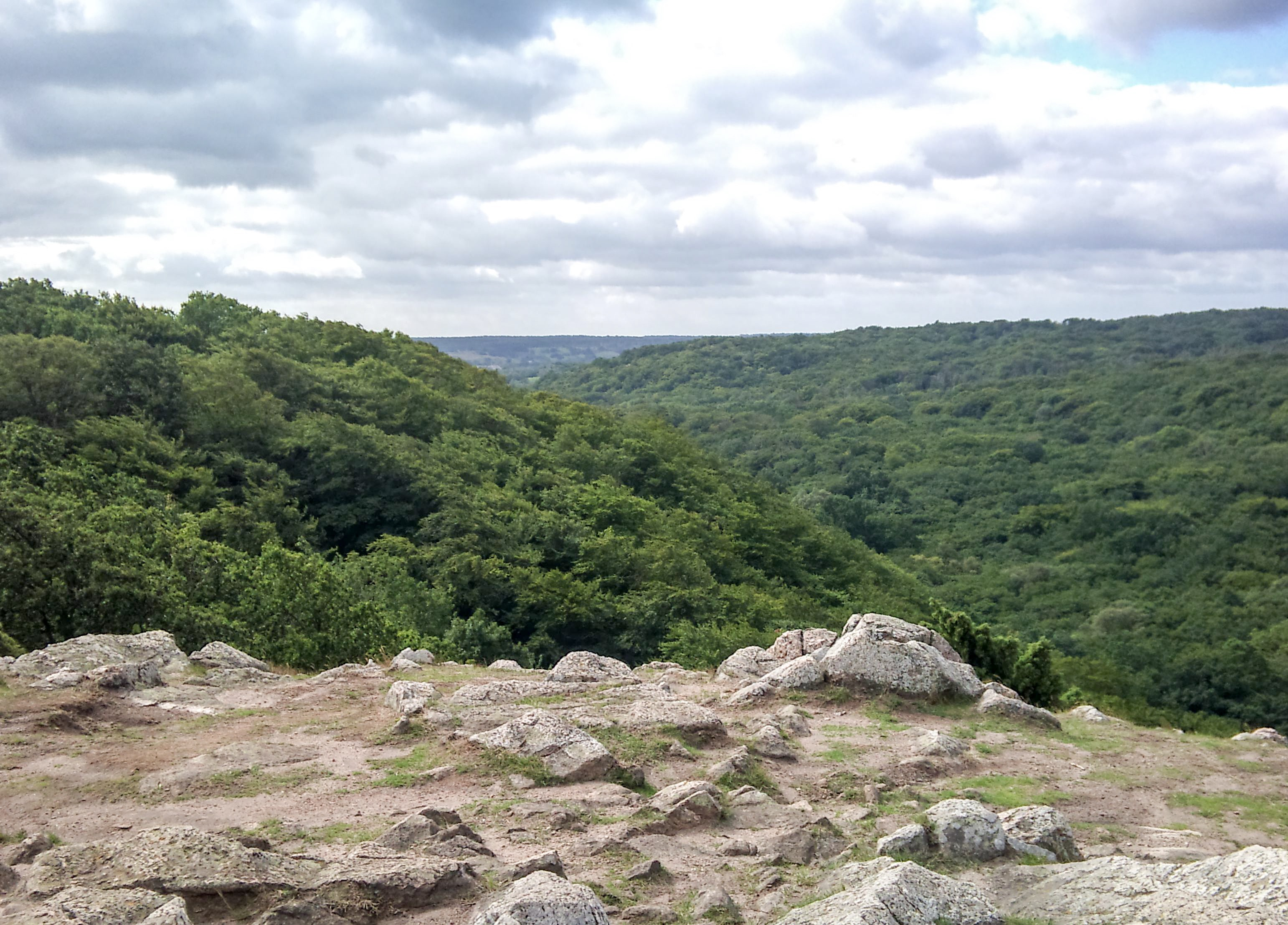
- Interactive map of Stenshuvud National Park
- Location: Skåne County, Sweden
- Coordinates: 55°40′N 14°16′E
- Area: 3.9 km^{2} (1.5 sq mi)
- Established: 1986
- Governing body: Naturvårdsverket

National parks of Sweden (clickable map)

Stenshuvud is a hill in the southeastern corner of Sweden, in the province of Scania, close to Kivik in Simrishamn Municipality. Since 1986, it is one of the National parks of Sweden. The park covers an area of about 3.9 km^{2} (1.5 mi^{2}).

The hill is 97 m (318 ft) high and faces the Baltic Sea. Since the surrounding landscape is relatively flat, it can be seen from a great distance and has traditionally been used as a landmark for seafarers. Many visitors trek up the hill to enjoy the view which is very good in clear weather. The Stenshuvud National Park is traversed by a section of the Skåneleden Trail, between Simrishamn and Kivik. The trail ascends Stenshuvud, offering a diverse range of landscapes and views.

Most of the area is covered with broadleaf forest, especially European hornbeam. The park also contains heaths, meadows and swamps. Because of the mild climate and varied habitats, many different animal and plant species can be encountered in the park. The park contains unusual Swedish wildlife such as the hazel dormouse, Eurasian golden oriole, European tree frog and agile frog. There are about 600 vascular plant species, including several types of orchids and the very rare barren strawberry.

Below the hill there is a popular beach for swimming. Close to the top are the remains of a ruin of a 5th- or 6th-century fortress.

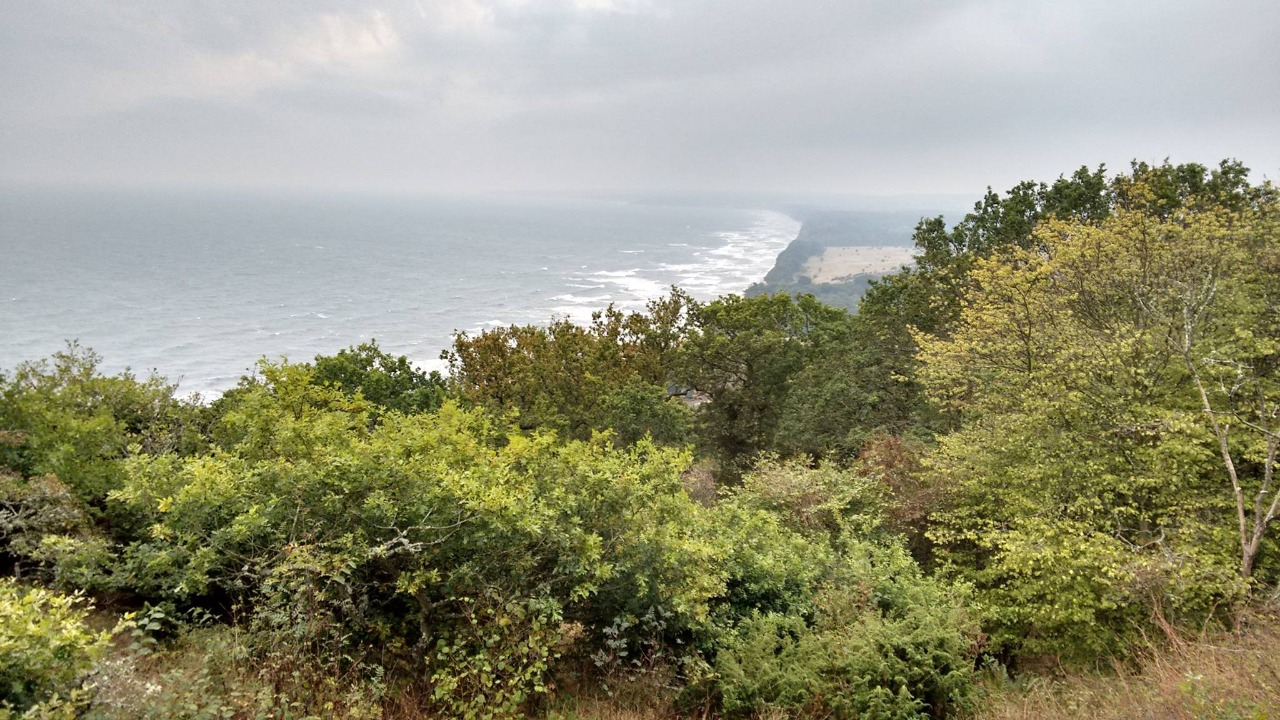
View from Stenshuvud southwards to Knäbäckhusen.

According to local folklore, the hill got its name ("Sten's head") from a giant living in the cave Giddastuan.

At the north of the hill is the Hällevik arboretum.

== Gallery ==
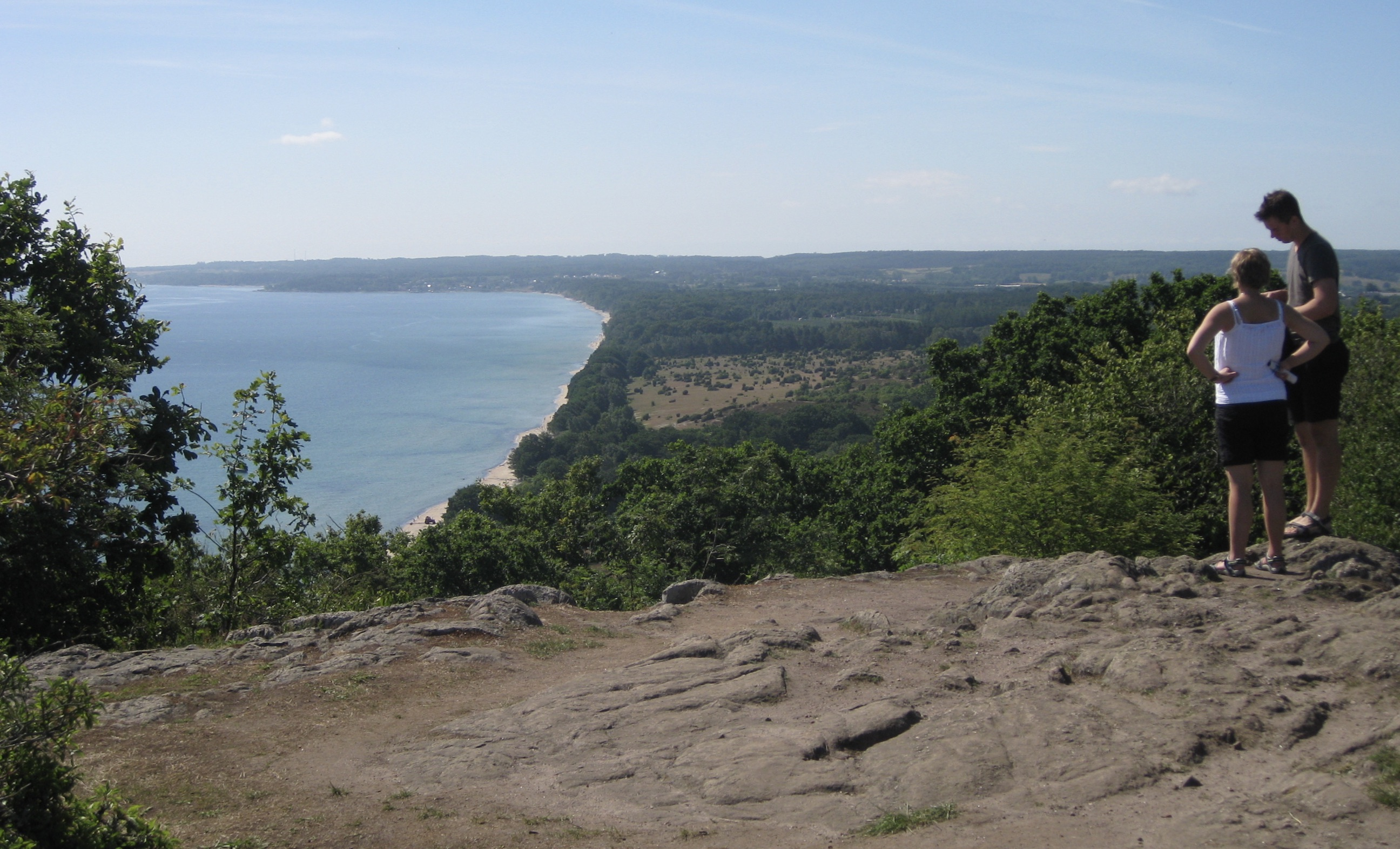
View south from Stenshuvud.

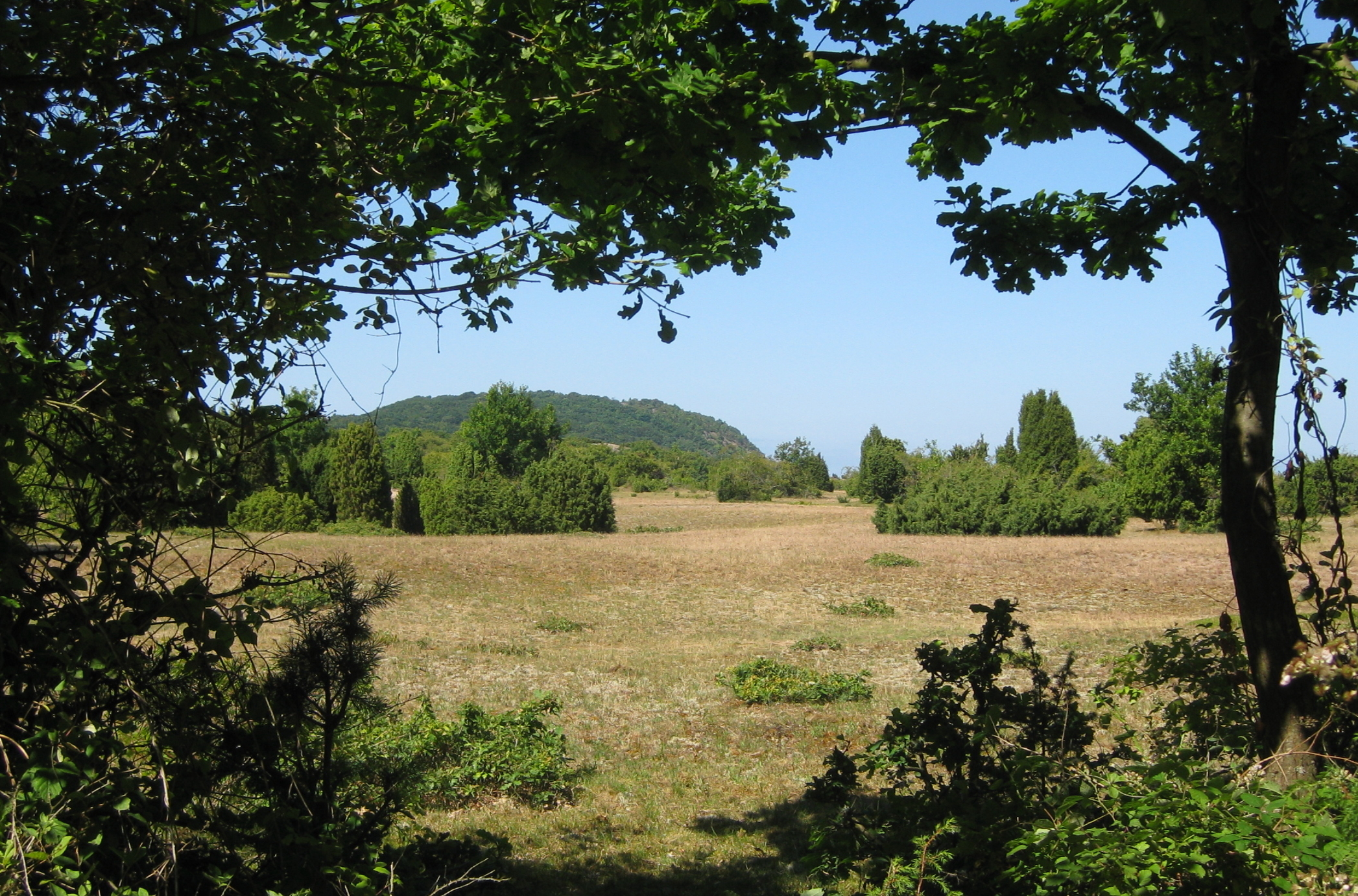

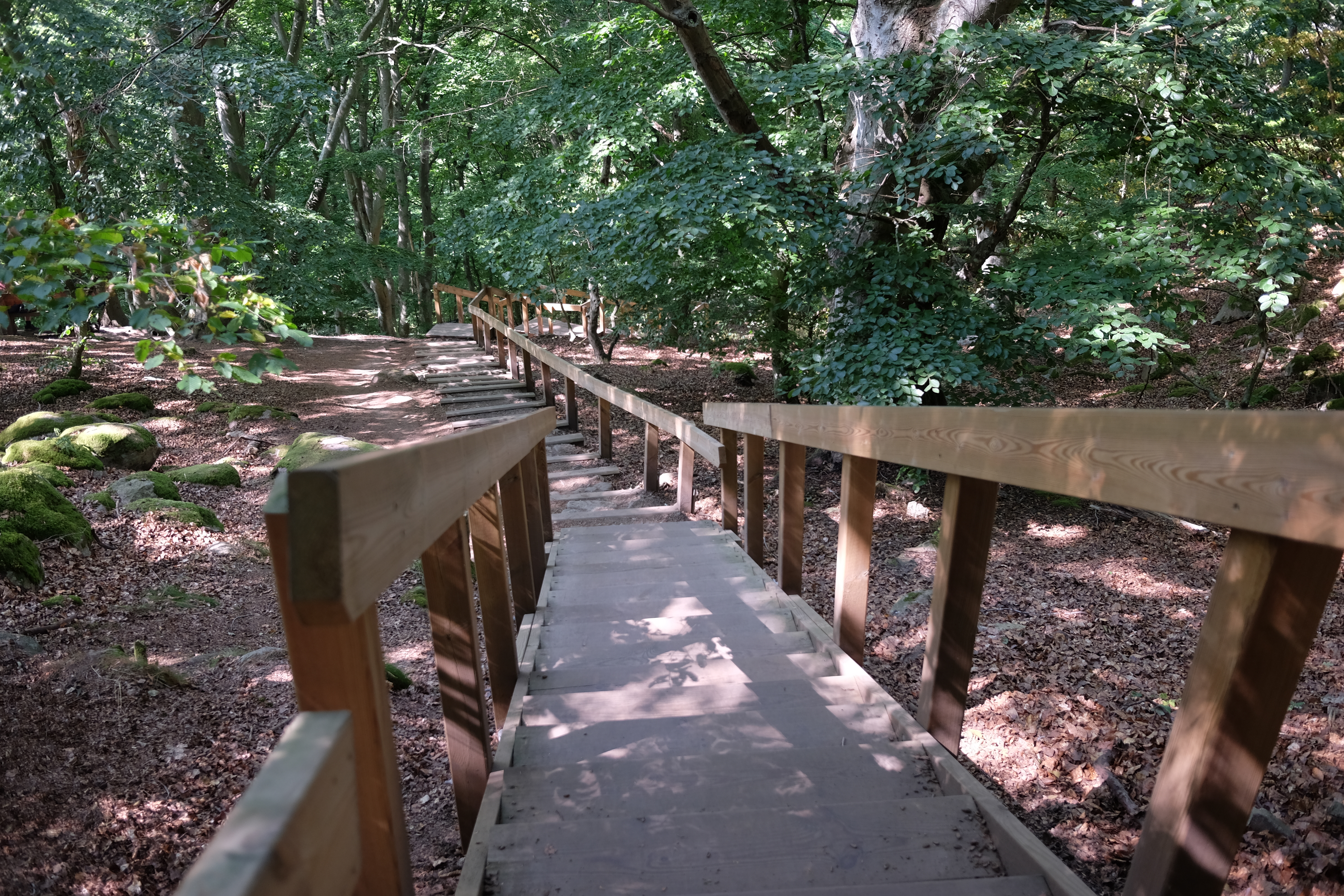
Stairs to the top.

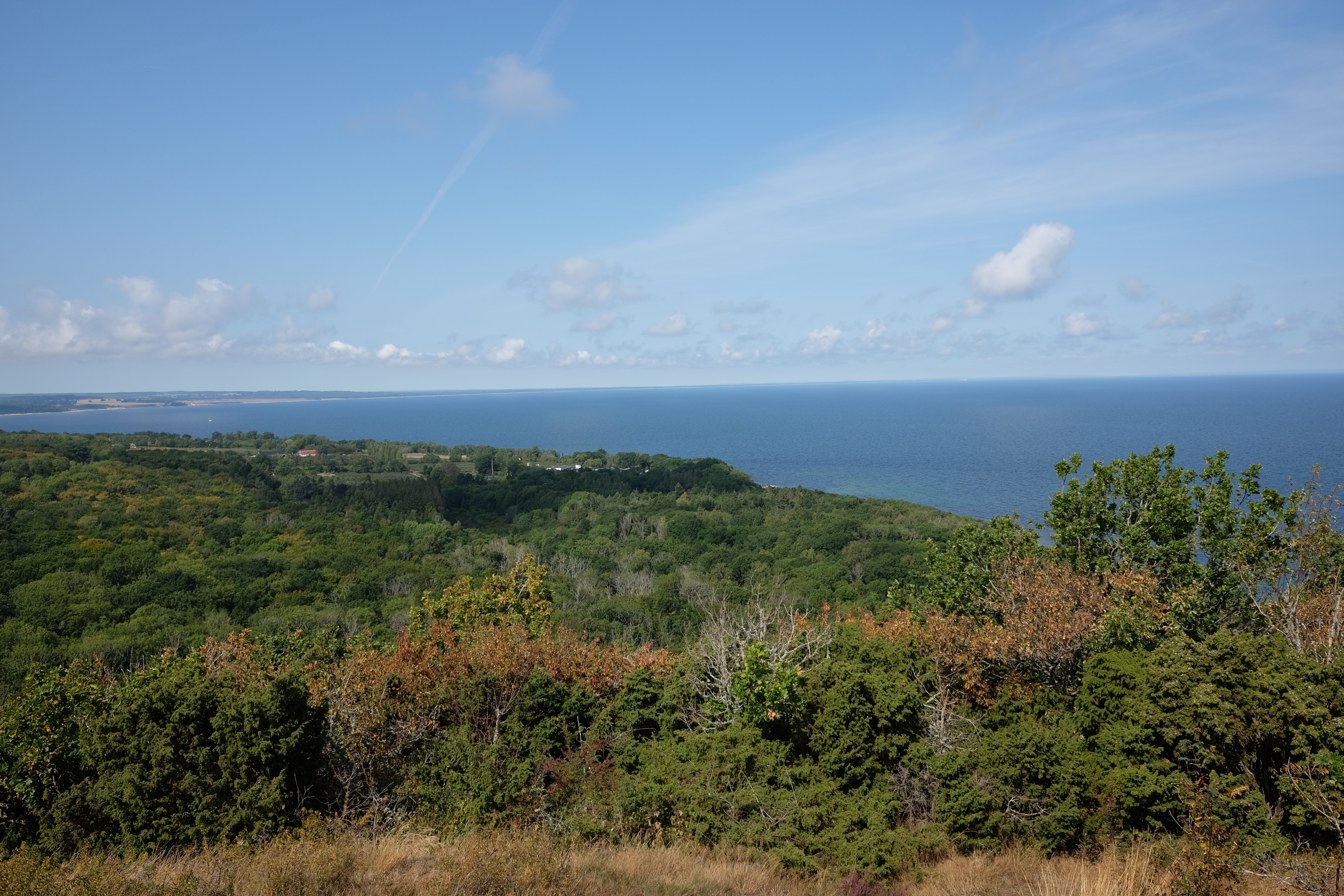
View to the north.

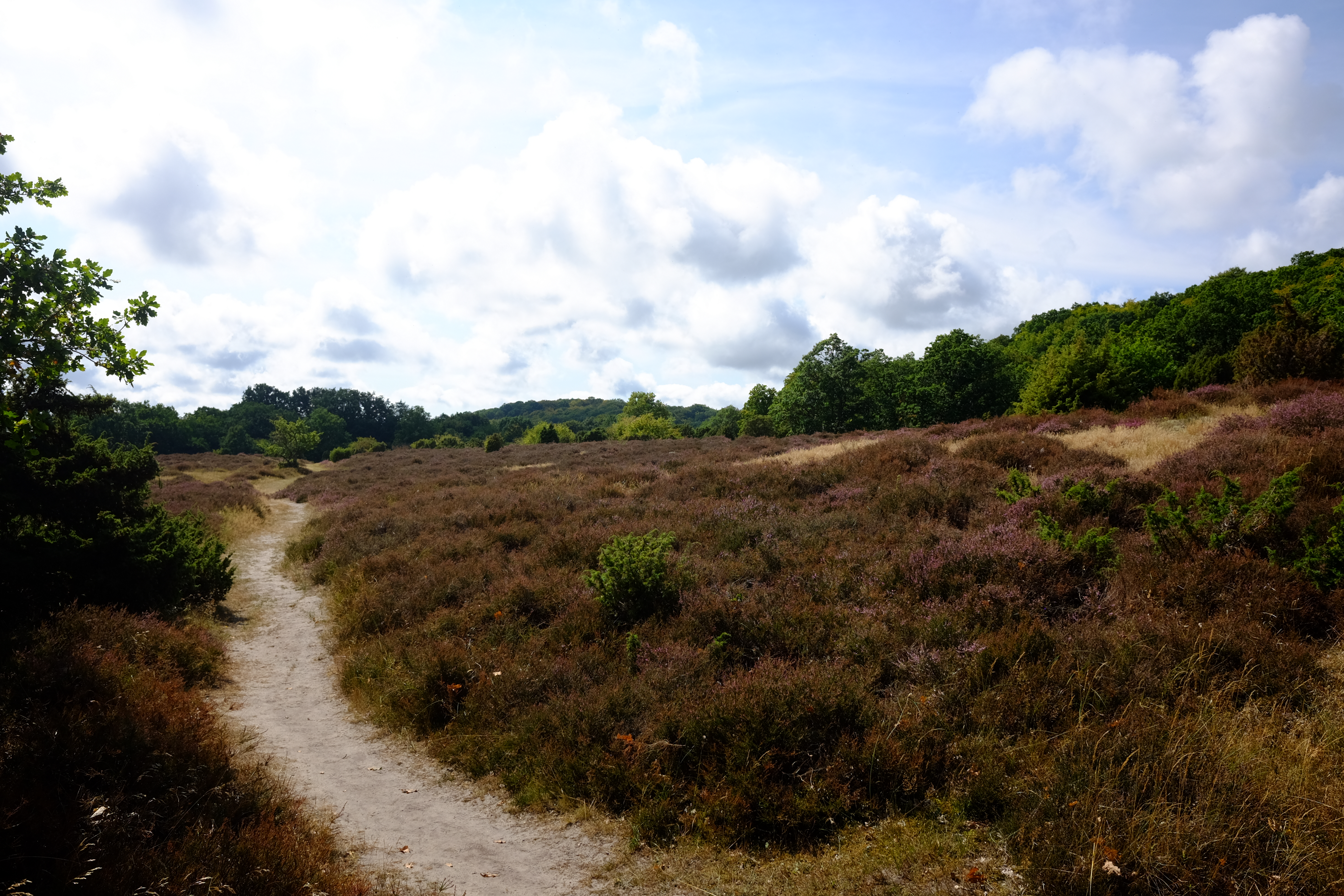
Heather in Stenshuvud.

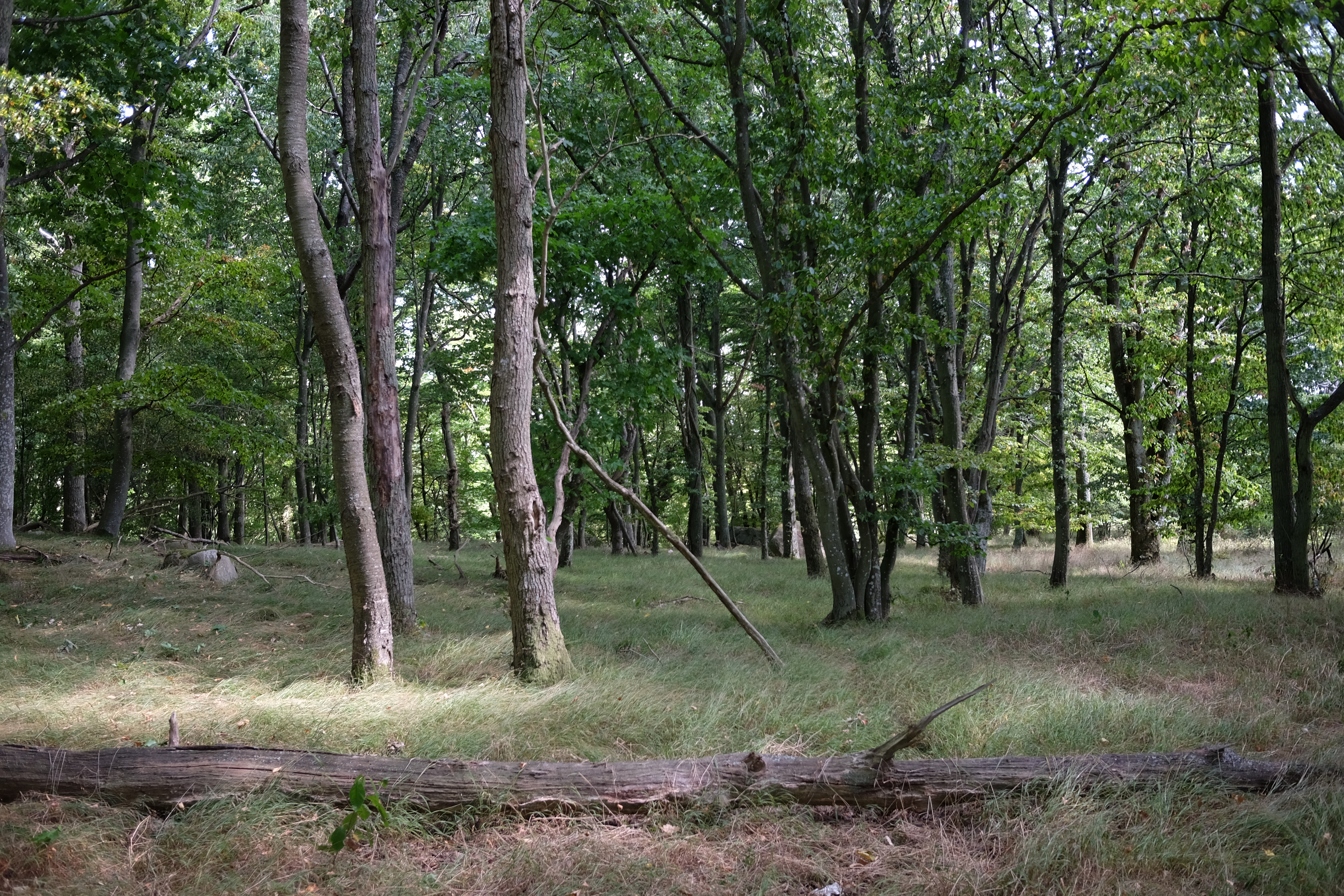
Beech forest

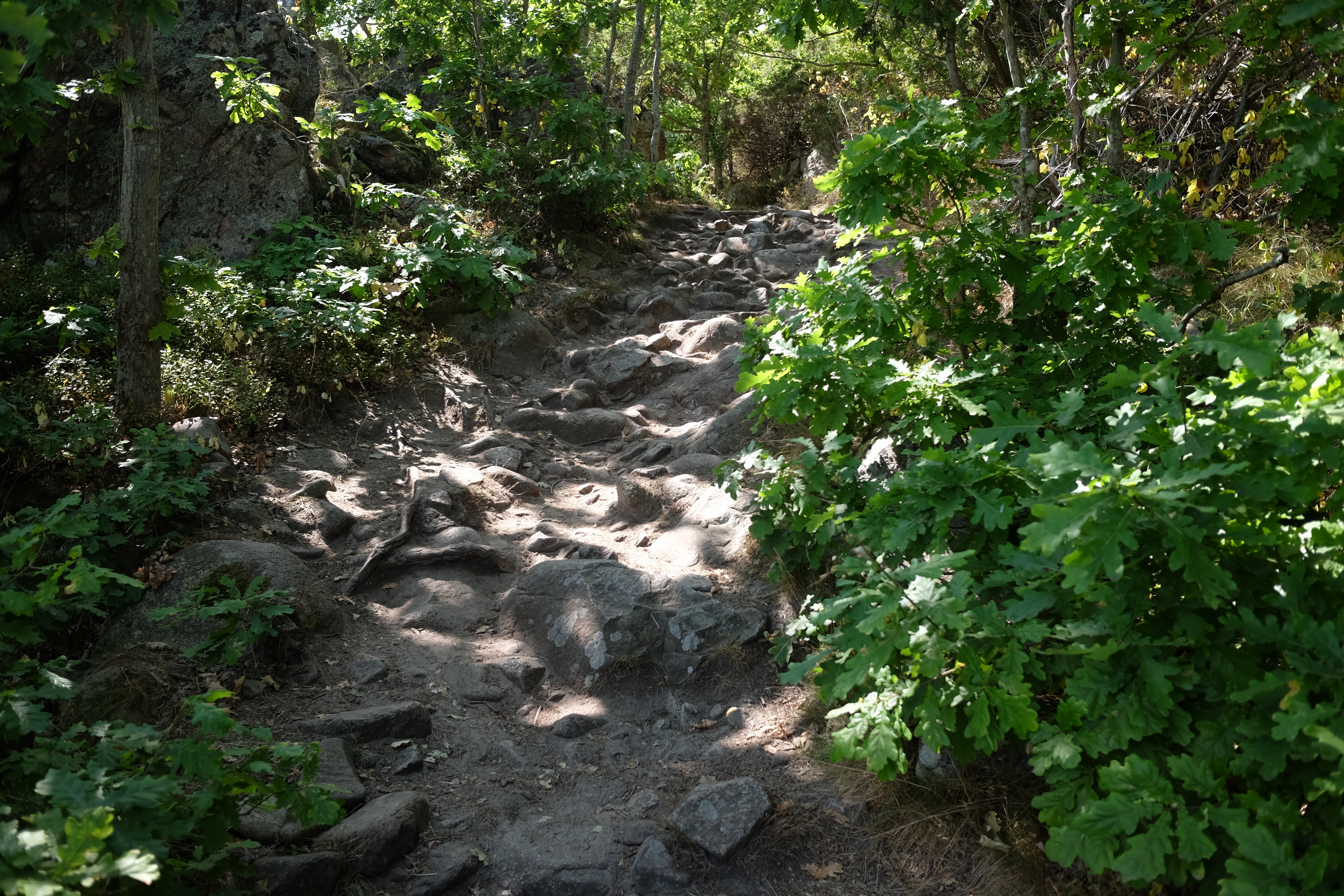
Stone-covered hiking trail.
