= Dals-Ed Municipality =

Dals-Ed Municipality Dals-Eds kommun
- Municipality
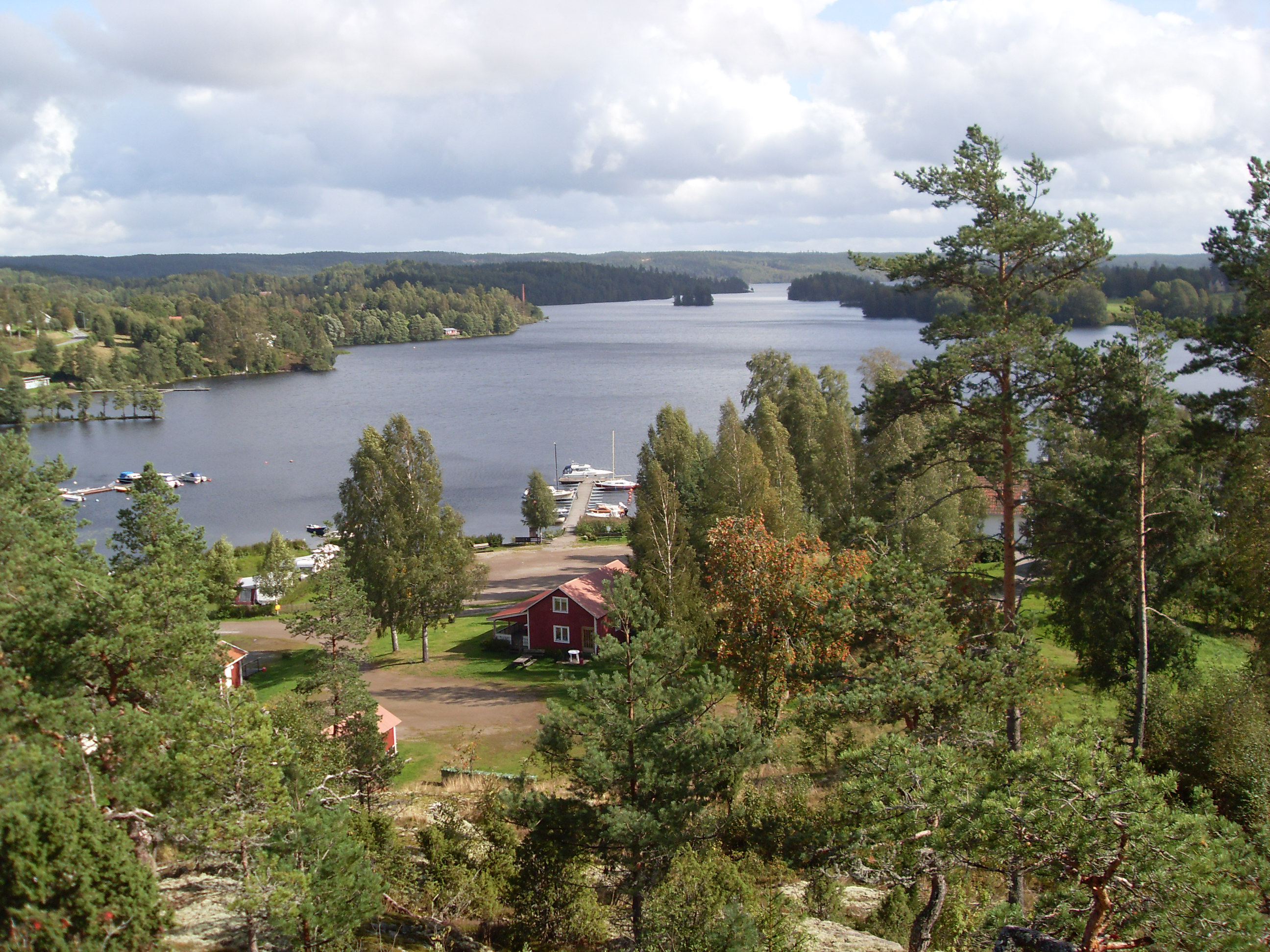

- Coat of arms

- Coordinates: 58°55′N 11°55′E
- Country: Sweden
- County: Västra Götaland County
- Seat: Ed

Area
  - Total: 825.43 km^{2} (318.70 sq mi)
  - Land: 724.34 km^{2} (279.67 sq mi)
  - Water: 101.09 km^{2} (39.03 sq mi)
- Area as of 1 January 2014.

Population (30 June 2025)
  - Total: 4,614
  - Density: 6.370/km^{2} (16.50/sq mi)
- Time zone: UTC+1 (CET)
  - Summer (DST): UTC+2 (CEST)
- ISO 3166 code: SE
- Province: Dalsland
- Municipal code: 1438
- Website: www.dalsed.se
- Density is calculated using land area only.

Dals-Ed Municipality (Swedish: Dals-Eds kommun) is a municipality in Västra Götaland County in western Sweden, on the border to Norway. Its seat is located in the town of Ed.

The present municipality was formed during the local government reform of 1952 through the amalgamation of six former units. Its territory was not affected by the 1971 reform.

== Locality ==
There is only one locality with more than 200 inhabitants in the municipality, and that is the seat Ed.

== Demographics ==
This is a demographic table based on Dals-Ed Municipality's electoral districts in the 2022 Swedish general election sourced from SVT's election platform, in turn taken from SCB official statistics.

In total there were 4,745 residents, including 3,504 Swedish citizens of voting age. 36.4% voted for the left coalition and 61.8% for the right coalition. Indicators are in percentage points except population totals and income.

Location	Residents	Citizen adults	Left vote	Right vote	Employed	Swedish parents	Foreign heritage	Income SEK	Degree
Location			%	%					
Dals-Ed SV	2,274	1,702	31.2	67.3	81	87	13	23,789	25
Dals-Ed NÖ	2,471	1,802	41.1	56.9	75	79	21	21,244	27
Source: SVT

== Tourism ==
Dals-Ed Municipality, located in the historical province of Dalsland, has a united tourism motto for Dalsland, saying that Dalsland, with its population of 50,000, is a place where one will not feel crowded. This is perhaps most fitting for Dals-Ed, as it is the sparsest populated municipality in Västra Götaland County, with 6.7 inhabitants per km^{2}.

The municipality promises a quiet environment. The nature hosts some 400 lakes for bathing, canoeing, fishing or boat tours. There are also several nature reserves, and the northernmost oak woods of Sweden grow in the municipality. In addition, the large Tresticklan National Park is contained within the municipality.

Historically Dals-Ed is rewarding for those interested in the ancient. Some 60 grave fields and burial places are situated here.
