= Ängsö National Park =

Swedish national park

- IUCN category II (national park)
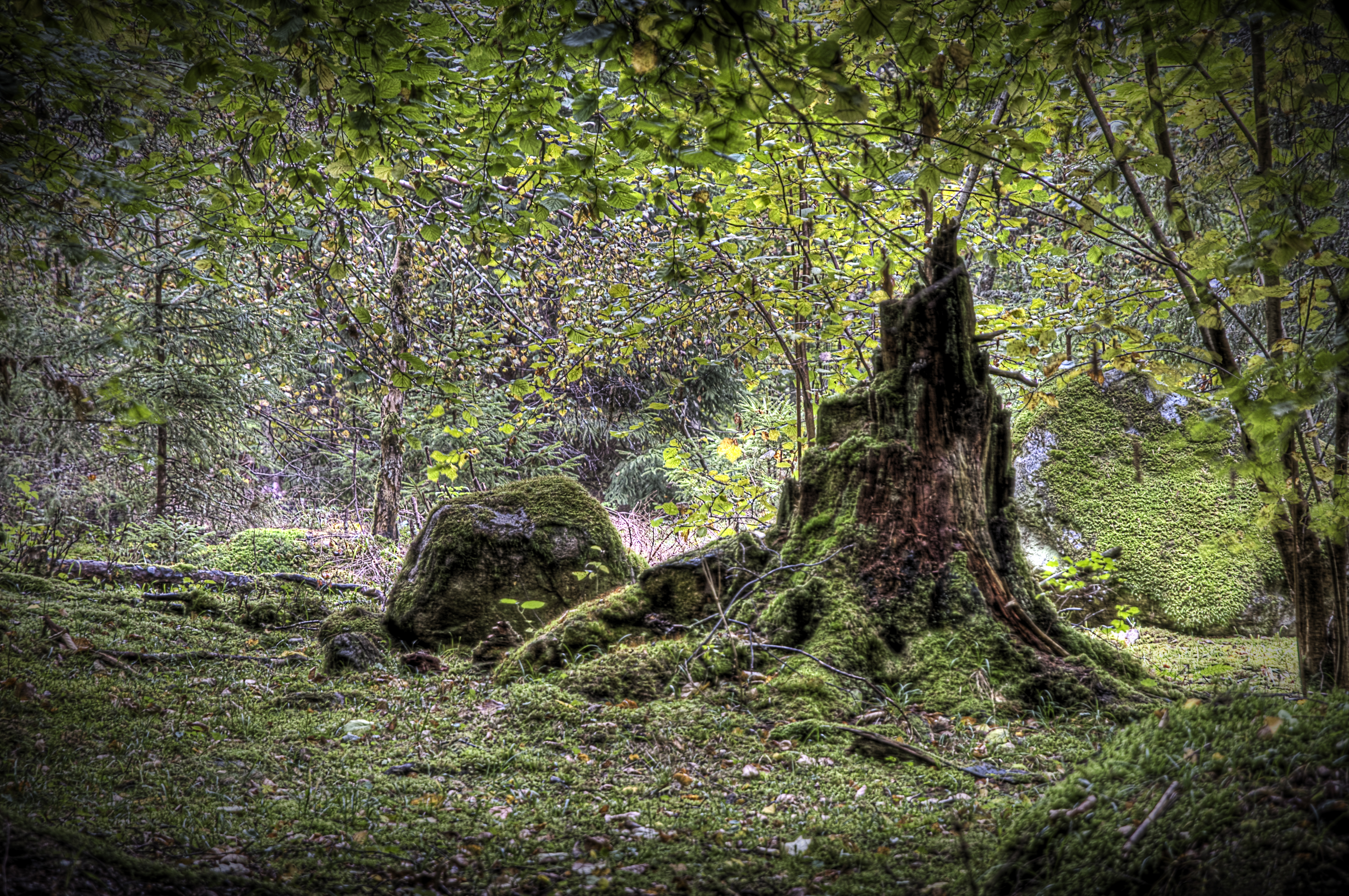
- Interactive map of Ängsö National Park
- Location: Stockholm County, Sweden
- Nearest city: Norrtälje, Stockholm
- Coordinates: 59°38′N 18°46′E
- Area: 1.68 km^{2} (0.65 sq mi)
- Established: 1909, extended 1988
- Governing body: Naturvårdsverket

National parks of Sweden (clickable map)

Ängsö is a Swedish national park. It is renowned for its wonderful nature and a pleasing agricultural landscape which was not destroyed by technical civilization. The park can only be reached by water. There are natural harbors and a wharf on the shores of the island.

== History ==
The island is not only a cultural and historical monument but it is a preserved piece of old Sweden. In the 17th century Ängsö consisted of two islands with a narrow sound between them and was used for moving by the farmers who lived on the island of Väringsö. But when the land rose from the sea, they joined and now the sound is a green meadow called Stormier. It lies in Stockholm's skärgård, between Norrtälje and Stockholm. It is situated 8 km (5.0 mi) from Bergshamra, in Stockholm County. Ängsö is considered to be a national park as a whole. In 1909, the authorities founded nine national parks in Sweden and Ängsö was chosen one of them for its rich flower cultural environment. Then it was split from Väringsö. One of the initiators was Ivar Afzelius who from 1892 was a summer resident on Väringsö. The park was extended in 1988 and now occupies the entire area of 195 ha (480 acres).

== Biology and ecology ==
The forest covers a third of the park's area. It is now one of the best preserved forests in the Archipelago: rare trees, bushes and flowers, such as cowslip and wood anemones grow there. The trees which dominated there are oak, ash, maple, birch. A lot of birds nest in the trees. Sometimes ospreys and eagles can be seen on the island where the sensitive nesting season is always protected. Some parts of the wood are off-limited during this period.
