= Tresticklan National Park =

National park in Sweden

- Tresticklans nationalpark
- IUCN category II (national park)
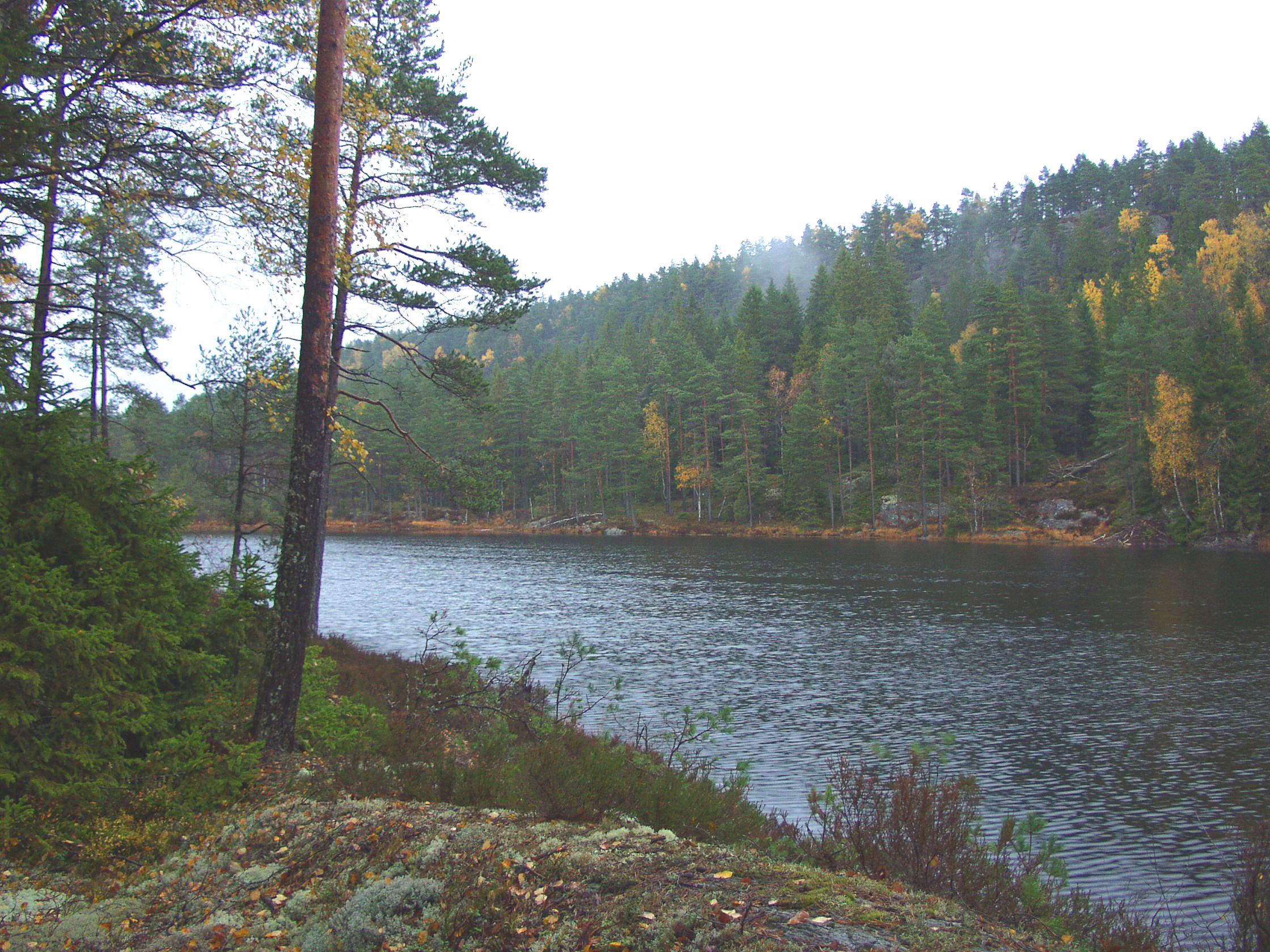
- Interactive map of Tresticklan National Park
- Location: Västra Götaland County, Sweden
- Coordinates: 59°02′N 11°45′E
- Area: 28.97 km^{2} (11.19 sq mi)
- Established: 1996
- Governing body: Naturvårdsverket

Tresticklan National Park (Swedish: Tresticklan nationalpark) is located in the municipality of Dals-Ed in northwestern Dalsland, Sweden, along the Norwegian border. "Trestickel" means "trident", possibly a reference to the shape of Lake Stora Tresticklan. This national park contains one of the few remaining areas of old-growth forest in southern Scandinavia. The park was established in 1996 and has an area of 28.97 km^{2} (11.19 mi^{2}). The park's highest point is the Orshöjden (276 m.a.sl).

National parks of Sweden (clickable map)

== See also ==
- Bråtane
- Lake Stora Le
- Råbocken
