= Dalsland =

Historical province of Sweden

Coordinates: 59°16′26″N 12°26′53″E

- Historical province
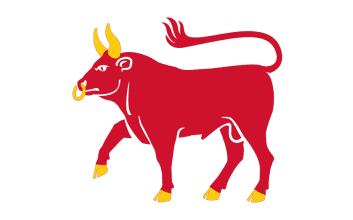
- Flag Coat of arms

- Country: Sweden
- Land: Götaland
- Counties: Västra Götaland County; Värmland County

Area
  - Total: 3,708 km^{2} (1,432 sq mi)

Population (December 31, 2023)
  - Total: 48,602
  - Density: 13.11/km^{2} (33.95/sq mi)

Ethnicity
  - Language: Swedish
  - Dialect: Götamål

Culture
  - Flower: Forget-me-not
  - Animal: Raven
  - Bird: —
  - Fish: —
- Time zone: UTC+1 (CET)
  - Summer (DST): UTC+2 (CEST)

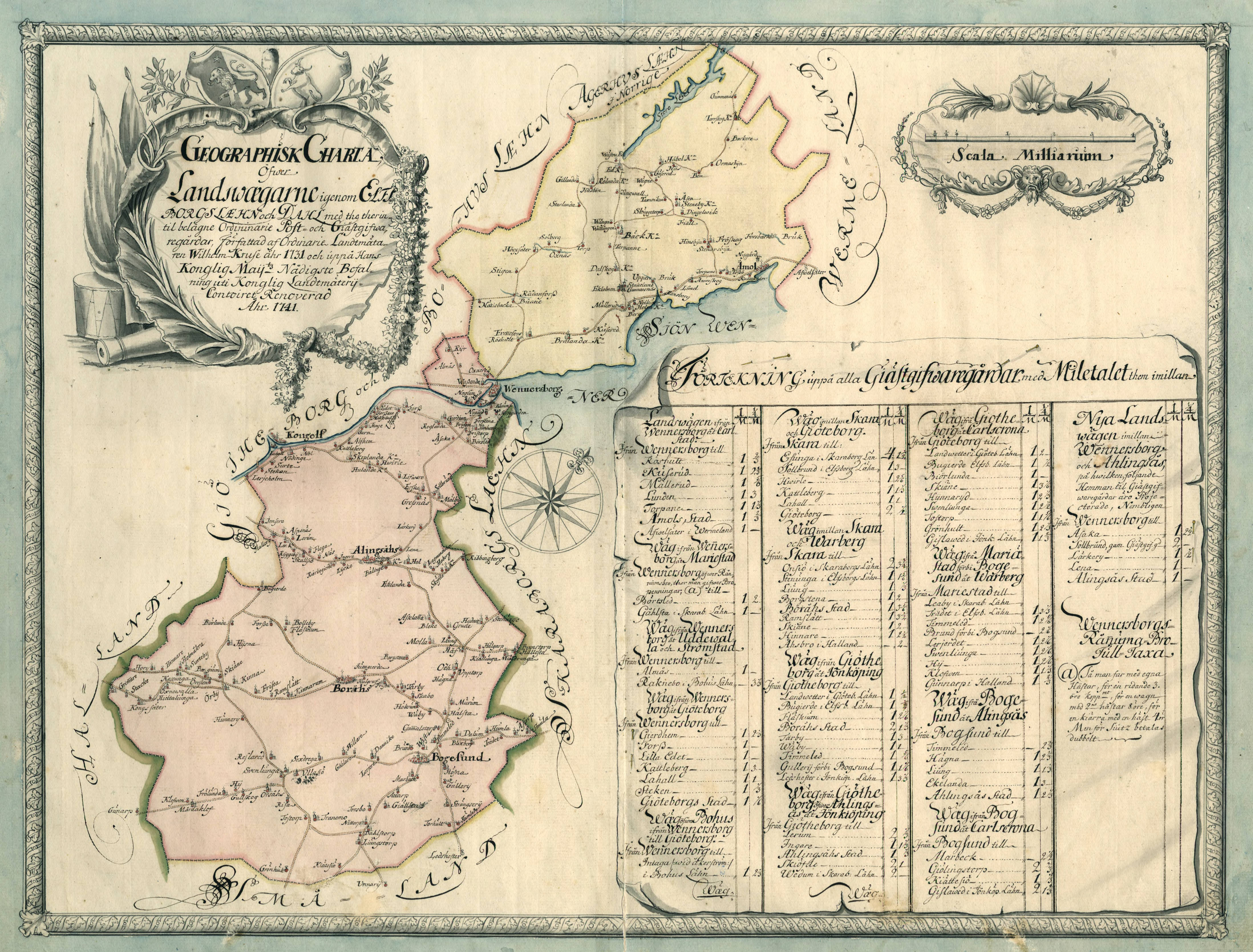
Map of the country roads through Älvsborg county and Dalsland in 1731.

Dalsland (Swedish pronunciation: [ˈdɑ̌ːlsland]) is a Swedish traditional province, or landskap, situated in Götaland in southern Sweden. Lying to the west of Lake Vänern, it is bordered by Värmland to the north, Västergötland to the southeast, Bohuslän to the west, and Norway to the northwest.

The province has a low population density of around 14 inhabitants/km^{2} and just one town of significant size: Åmål. The total population numbers 50,604. The uninhabited areas are characterized by dense forests in the northwestern uplands and lakes in the east, giving rise to the epithet, commonly used for Dalsland, of "Sweden's lake province".

The Latinized name Dalia, which was often used to name Dalsland in older prints, can still sometimes be encountered.

== Administration ==
The traditional provinces of Sweden serve no administrative or political purposes, but are historical and cultural entities. Dalsland formed the northern part of the administrative county Älvsborg County until 1998 when the present Västra Götaland County was formed. A very small part of the province, Dalboredden, is in Värmland County.

== Heraldry ==
Dalsland was granted its arms at the time of the funeral of Gustav Vasa in 1560. In the 16th century Dalsland had the status of a County (Comitatus) and was represented with an Earl's coronet. On January 18, 1884, the Privy Council gave all provinces the right of use to a ducal coronet for their coat of arms. Blazon: "Argent an Ox passant armed and hoofed Or."

== Etymology ==
Dalsland was originally called Dal, "Valley", originally referring only to the flat southeastern part. The name Dal is still in part used locally, about all Dalsland. The name Dalsland, "valley land", might have been given by central authorities, to distinguish from Dalarna.

== Geography ==
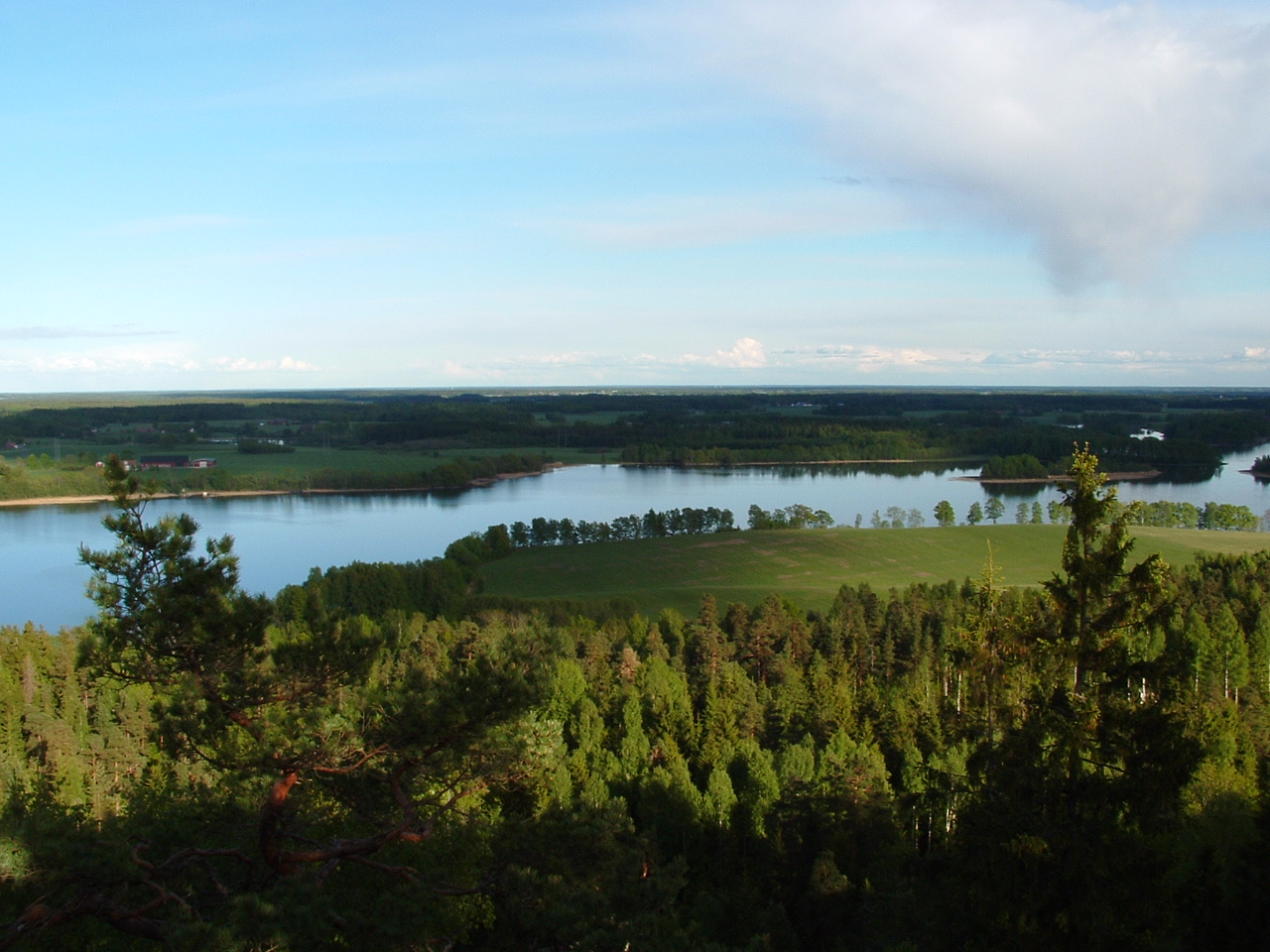
A typical lake in Dalsland

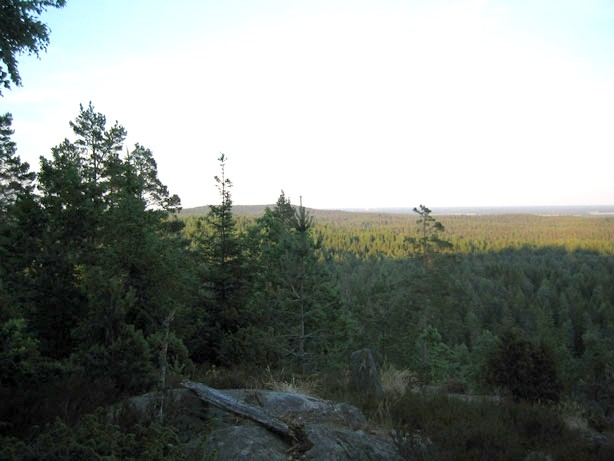
View from the Kroppefjäll tableland.

No other part of Sweden has its area covered with as many lakes as Dalsland does. Of its total area, around 450 km^{2} (170 sq mi) is water, but a part of lake Vänern (Sweden's largest lake) also belongs to the province.

From the shores of Vänern, one can sail through the river systems up to the lake Stora Le. Stora Le has a length of 66 km (41 mi), whereof 37 km (23 mi) are within Dalsland, and the remaining part within the Värmland province, with a bay into Norway.

The terrain consists of 1/4 agricultural lands and 2/3 forested lands. The province's southern part are suitable for agriculture, but there is a shortage of manpower to cultivate it.

Tresticklan is a national park in Dalsland. There are also several nature reserves.

The Dalsland Canal was completed in 1868 and has 28 locks in its length of 254 km (158 mi).

=== Sub-divisions ===
Municipalities are local districts of administration, with elected councils. Within Dalsland's borders these are the municipalities:

1. Bengtsfors Municipality
2. Dals-Ed Municipality
3. Färgelanda Municipality
4. Mellerud Municipality
5. Åmål Municipality
6. Parts of Munkedal, Säffle, Vänersborg and Årjäng Municipalities, although all municipal seats of these four are outside Dalsland's borders.

Dalsland was historically divided into one chartered city and five hundreds. The hundreds were provincial subdivisions from the Middle Ages, but were discontinued in the early 20th century. Dalsland's chartered city was Åmål (royal charter in 1643). Its hundreds were Nordal Hundred, Sundal Hundred, Tössbo Hundred, Valbo Hundred and Vedbo Hundred. They corresponded approximately to today's municipalities: Nordal → Mellerud, Sundal → part of Vänersborg, Tössbo+Åmål → Åmål, Valbo → Färgelanda and Vedbo → Bengtsfors+Dals-Ed.

== Elections ==
Dalsland is part of Västra Götaland County and does not have its own assembly. However, these are combined results from the five municipalities whose seats are in the province in Riksdag elections since the 1973 election, the first since the municipal merger.

=== Riksdag ===
Year	%	Votes	V	S	MP	C	L	KD	M	SD	NyD	Other
1973	90.6	31,885	1.7	38.3		39.0	7.9	2.1	10.8			0.1
1976	91.6	33,199	1.7	36.7		39.2	8.1	1.8	12.5			0.1
1979	90.4	33,314	2.2	38.0		33.1	8.0	1.9	16.7			0.2
1982	90.8	33,503	2.2	40.4	1.3	29.3	5.4	2.3	19.1			0.1
1985	88.7	32,724	2.6	40.3	1.4	25.7	12.3		17.5			0.1
1988	84.5	30,825	3.1	41.0	5.4	24.1	9.6	3.4	13.4			0.1
1991	85.5	31,079	2.7	35.7	2.5	18.2	6.5	9.6	16.3		8.1	0.3
1994	84.8	30,330	4.4	44.6	5.3	16.6	5.2	5.0	17.5		1.1	0.4
1998	79.5	27,527	10.4	37.3	4.3	11.6	3.4	14.8	16.1			2.0
2002	77.4	26,025	6.4	42.2	3.2	14.8	9.3	11.7	10.2	1.0		1.3
2006	79.2	26,173	5.0	39.7	3.5	14.7	5.2	7.6	18.4	3.0		2.9
2010	81.6	26,665	4.9	35.2	4.7	11.3	5.5	6.0	25.0	6.5		0.8
2014	83.7	26,802	4.0	35.1	3.6	10.6	3.3	4.5	16.5	19.8		2.5
2018	85.7	26,941	5.1	29.6	2.5	10.2	3.0	7.0	14.6	26.8		1.3

== History ==
The first recorded use of the term "Dalsland" dates to 1508. Before then, the term used was "Dal", or "de Dal", literally meaning "Valley" or "the Valleys", which referred to two specific valleys in the southern area closest to Vänern.

The area has around 5,000 ancient remains. They indicate the origin of the inhabitants to stem from the south and the province Bohuslän; dialectal studies and social aspects have come to a similar conclusion.

In the 13th century, the inhabitants were referred to as "West Geats west of Vänern" by King Magnus Ladulås. The oldest provincial law from 1442 called the region "Dal in Västergötland". All sources point to them being a remote part of the province of Västergötland. The mountainous parts were at the time known as "markerna", meaning "hinterlands".

Its exposed location near the Norwegian border made it subject to invasion, although to a lesser degree than Bohuslän and Västergötland. It was first conquered around 1100 by the Norwegian Magnus Barefoot, who only held the province until King Valdemar Atterdag redrew provincial borders.

The Nordic Seven Years' War was particularly hard, especially 1568 when 281 farms were burnt. Other wars that were negative for the province were those of 1611–1612, 1644–1645 and 1675–1679.

The population has seen a decline since the 1880s, at the time numbering over 83,000, with emigration to North America and Norway accounting for most decreases early on. A census counts the local population to be 70,486 in 1905. These days, population numbers lie around 50,000.

Åmål, the province's largest town, has however seen an increase from 3,858 residents 1905 to a current approximate 9,000.

== Culture ==
People in the western part of Dalsland were believed to have migrated from Bohuslän, although probably long before that area was Norwegian. A distinctive feature in the Högsäter-area of Valbo Hundred was an inclination to brown eyes and dark hair, and a slightly rounder facial shape.

The municipalities in Dalsland still makes frequent use of the provincial name, as the means to distinguish their history and culture from the rest of West Sweden. Culturally, Dalsland is as connected to Värmland as it is to the other neighbouring provinces Västergötland and Bohuslän.

=== Tongue ===
The dialect is a Swedish language variety known as the Dalbo-dialect. It is a variation of the Götamål dialect, and closest related to the other Götaland provinces, although it differs from them in the absence of a guttural R.

Its location by the Norwegian border has also added some features. The dialects vary over the province, since it is mostly hilly but has some more densely populated areas near its borders. These areas have been influenced by the neighbour areas.

One dialectal oddity is the norm for locals to say "bo på Dal", in English "live on [the] Valley", as opposed to the usual "bo i Västergötland", in English "live in Västergötland".

== Sports ==
Football in the province is administered by Dalslands Fotbollförbund.

== See also ==
- Egenäs
