= Telephone numbers in Sweden =

- Location of Sweden in dark green
- Country: Sweden
- Continent: Europe
- Regulator: Swedish Post and Telecom Authority
- Numbering plan type: Open
- NSN length: 7 to 13 digits
- Numbering plan: Sweden National Numbering Plan
- Last updated: 22 May 2018
- Country code: +46
- International access: 00
- Long-distance: 0

In Sweden, the area codes are, including the leading 0, two, three or four digits long, with larger towns and cities having shorter area codes permitting a larger number of telephone numbers in the eight to ten digits used (including the leading '0'). Before the 1990s, ten-digit numbers were very rare, but they have become increasingly common because of the deregulation of telecommunications, the new 112 emergency number (which required change of all numbers starting with 11), and the creation of a single area code for the Greater Stockholm area. No subscriber number is shorter than five digits. The longest subscriber numbers have eight digits (only in the Stockholm area).

== History ==
The first automatic telephony in Sweden was operating in 1924 within a small area in Stockholm. Area codes were introduced around 1935 for usage in automatic national telephony. 330 areas with three or four digits were allocated with 010 for Stockholm, and maximum nine digits in total as a technical limit. In order to allow more numbers including seven digit local numbers in Stockholm, in 1964 Stockholm changed from 010 to 08. Automatic international calls were introduced in 1965 with the prefix 009, changed to 00 in 1999. In 1992 all area codes beginning with 07 were allocated as 08 plus eight digits (the nine digits technical limit was then bypassed), and 07 was allocated for wireless applications such as mobile phones. Analog mobile phones had been using 010.

== Area codes ==
Swedish geographical area codes map

010	Geographically Independent Numbers
011	Norrköping
0120	Åtvidaberg
0121	Söderköping
0122	Finspång
0123	Valdemarsvik
0125	Vikbolandet
013	Linköping
0140	Tranås
0141	Motala
0142	Mjölby-Skänninge-Boxholm
0143	Vadstena
0144	Ödeshög
0150	Katrineholm
0151	Vingåker
0152	Strängnäs
0155	Nyköping-Oxelösund
0156	Trosa-Vagnhärad
0157	Flen-Malmköping
0158	Gnesta
0159	Mariefred and Åkers styckebruk
016	Eskilstuna-Torshälla
0171	Enköping
0173	Öregrund-Östhammar
0174	Alunda
0175	Hallstavik-Rimbo
0176	Norrtälje
018	Uppsala
019	Örebro-Kumla
020	toll-free, not reachable from abroad
021	Västerås
0220	Hallstahammar-Surahammar
0221	Köping
0222	Skinnskatteberg
0223	Fagersta-Norberg
0224	Sala-Heby
0225	Hedemora-Säter
0226	Avesta-Krylbo
0227	Kungsör
023	Falun
0240	Ludvika-Smedjebacken
0241	Gagnef-Floda
0243	Borlänge
0246	Svärdsjö-Enviken
0247	Leksand-Insjön
0248	Rättvik
0250	Mora-Orsa
0251	Älvdalen
0252	Comvic Mobile Numbers
0253	Idre-Särna
0254	Comvic Mobile Numbers
0258	Furudal
026	Gävle-Sandviken
0270	Söderhamn
0271	Alfta-Edsbyn
0278	Bollnäs
0280	Malung
0281	Vansbro
0290	Hofors-Storvik
0291	Hedesunda-Österfärnebo
0292	Tärnsjö-Östervåla
0293	Tierp-Söderfors
0294	Karlholmsbruk-Skärplinge
0295	Örbyhus-Dannemora
0297	Ockelbo-Hamrånge
0300	Kungsbacka
0301	Hindås
0302	Lerum
0303	Kungälv
0304	Orust-Tjörn
031	Gothenburg
0320	Kinna
0321	Ulricehamn
0322	Alingsås-Vårgårda
0325	Svenljunga-Tranemo
033	Borås
0340	Varberg
0345	Hyltebruk-Torup
0346	Falkenberg
035	Halmstad
036	Jönköping-Huskvarna
0370	Värnamo
0371	Gislaved-Anderstorp
0372	Ljungby
0376	Telia Mobile numbers
0380	Nässjö
0381	Eksjö
0382	Sävsjö
0383	Vetlanda
0390	Gränna
0392	Mullsjö
0393	Vaggeryd
040	Malmö
0410	Trelleborg
0411	Ystad
0413	Eslöv-Höör
0414	Simrishamn
0415	Hörby
0416	Sjöbo
0417	Tomelilla
0418	Landskrona-Svalöv
042	Helsingborg-Höganäs
0430	Laholm
0431	Ängelholm-Båstad
0433	Markaryd-Strömsnäsbruk
0435	Klippan-Perstorp
044	Kristianstad
0451	Hässleholm
0454	Karlshamn-Olofström
0455	Karlskrona
0456	Sölvesborg-Bromölla
0457	Ronneby
0459	Ryd
046	Lund
0470	Växjö
0471	Emmaboda
0472	Alvesta-Rydaholm
0474	Åseda-Lenhovda
0476	Älmhult
0477	Tingsryd
0478	Lessebo
0479	Osby
0480	Kalmar
0481	Nybro
0485	Öland
0486	Torsås
0490	Västervik
0491	Oskarshamn-Högsby
0492	Vimmerby
0493	Gamleby
0494	Kisa
0495	Hultsfred-Virserum
0496	Mariannelund
0498	Gotland
0499	Mönsterås
0500	Skövde
0501	Mariestad
0502	Tidaholm
0503	Hjo
0504	Tibro
0505	Karlsborg
0506	Töreboda-Hova
0510	Lidköping
0511	Skara-Götene
0512	Vara-Nossebro
0513	Herrljunga
0514	Grästorp
0515	Falköping
0518	Telia Mobile Numbers
0519	Telia Mobile Numbers
0520	Trollhättan
0521	Vänersborg
0522	Uddevalla
0523	Lysekil
0524	Munkedal
0525	Grebbestad
0526	Strömstad
0528	Färgelanda
0530	Mellerud
0531	Bengtsfors
0532	Åmål
0533	Säffle
0534	Ed
054	Karlstad
0550	Kristinehamn
0551	Gullspång
0552	Deje
0553	Molkom
0554	Kil
0555	Grums
0560	Torsby
0563	Hagfors-Munkfors
0564	Sysslebäck
0565	Sunne
0570	Arvika
0571	Charlottenberg-Åmotfors
0573	Årjäng
0580	Kopparberg
0581	Lindesberg
0582	Hallsberg-Pålsboda
0583	Askersund
0584	Laxå
0585	Fjugesta-Svartå
0586	Karlskoga-Degerfors
0587	Nora
0589	Arboga
0590	Filipstad
0591	Hällefors-Grythyttan
060	Sundsvall-Timrå
0611	Härnösand
0612	Kramfors
0613	Ullånger
0620	Sollefteå
0621	Junsele
0622	Näsåker
0623	Ramsele
0624	Backe
063	Östersund
0640	Krokom
0642	Lit
0643	Hallen-Oviken
0644	Hammerdal
0645	Föllinge
0647	Åre-Järpen
0650	Hudiksvall
0651	Ljusdal
0652	Bergsjö
0653	Delsbo
0657	Los
0660	Örnsköldsvik
0661	Bredbyn
0662	Björna
0663	Husum
0670	Strömsund
0671	Hoting
0672	Gäddede
0673	Telia Mobile Numbers
0674	Telenor mobile Numbers
0675	H3G Mobile Numbers
0676	Mobile Numbers
0680	Sveg
0682	Rätan
0684	Hede-Funäsdalen
0687	Svenstavik
0690	Ånge
0691	Torpshammar
0692	Liden
0693	Bräcke-Gällö
0695	Stugun
0696	Hammarstrand
070, 072, 073, 076, 079	Mobile phone networks
0710	Mobile Broadband services with format 071 0XX XX XXX XXX. They support data and sometimes SMS but rarely voice
0719	Telematic services (M2M) numbers with format 071 9XX XX XXX XXX. They support data and sometimes SMS but rarely voice
074(x)	Pagers
075, 077	non-geographical
0771	instead of 020 (toll-free) when calling from abroad as not toll-free
078	provider-specific services allocated in provider blocks. Not fixed lengths
079xxx	provider-specific directory assistance (no longer in use)
08	Greater Stockholm. Includes subscribers in twelve former area codes surrounding Stockholm (075x, 076x) that were abolished in 1991 to make 07 available for GSM mobiles and other non-geographic Numbers.
0900, 0939, 0944, 099	Premium rate calls
090	Umeå
0910	Skellefteå
0911	Piteå
0912	Byske
0913	Lövånger
0914	Burträsk
0915	Bastuträsk
0916	Jörn
0918	Norsjö
0920	Luleå
0921	Boden
0922	Haparanda
0923	Kalix
0924	Råneå
0925	Lakaträsk
0926	Överkalix
0927	Övertorneå
0928	Harads
0929	Älvsbyn
0930	Nordmaling
0932	Bjurholm
0933	Vindeln
0934	Robertsfors
0935	Vännäs
0940	Vilhelmina
0941	Åsele
0942	Dorotea
0943	Fredrika
0950	Lycksele
0951	Storuman
0952	Sorsele
0953	Malå
0954	Tärnaby
0960	Arvidsjaur
0961	Arjeplog
0970	Gällivare
0971	Jokkmokk
0973	Porjus
0975	Hakkas
0976	Vuollerim
0977	Korpilombolo
0978	Pajala
0980	Kiruna
0981	Vittangi

== Special numbers ==
112	Emergency services
11313	Information during accidents and crises
11414	Police (non-emergency)
1177	Health care advice
118xxx	Number enquiries
90 xxx	Special numbers, including Telia customer care (90 200, 90350, 90400) and the former emergency number 90 000, now replaced by 112
95 xx	Carrier selection

Sweden adopted 00 as its international access code in 1999 replacing 009, 007 and 008x. Carrier pre-selection was introduced at the same time.
