= Avaliden =

- Village
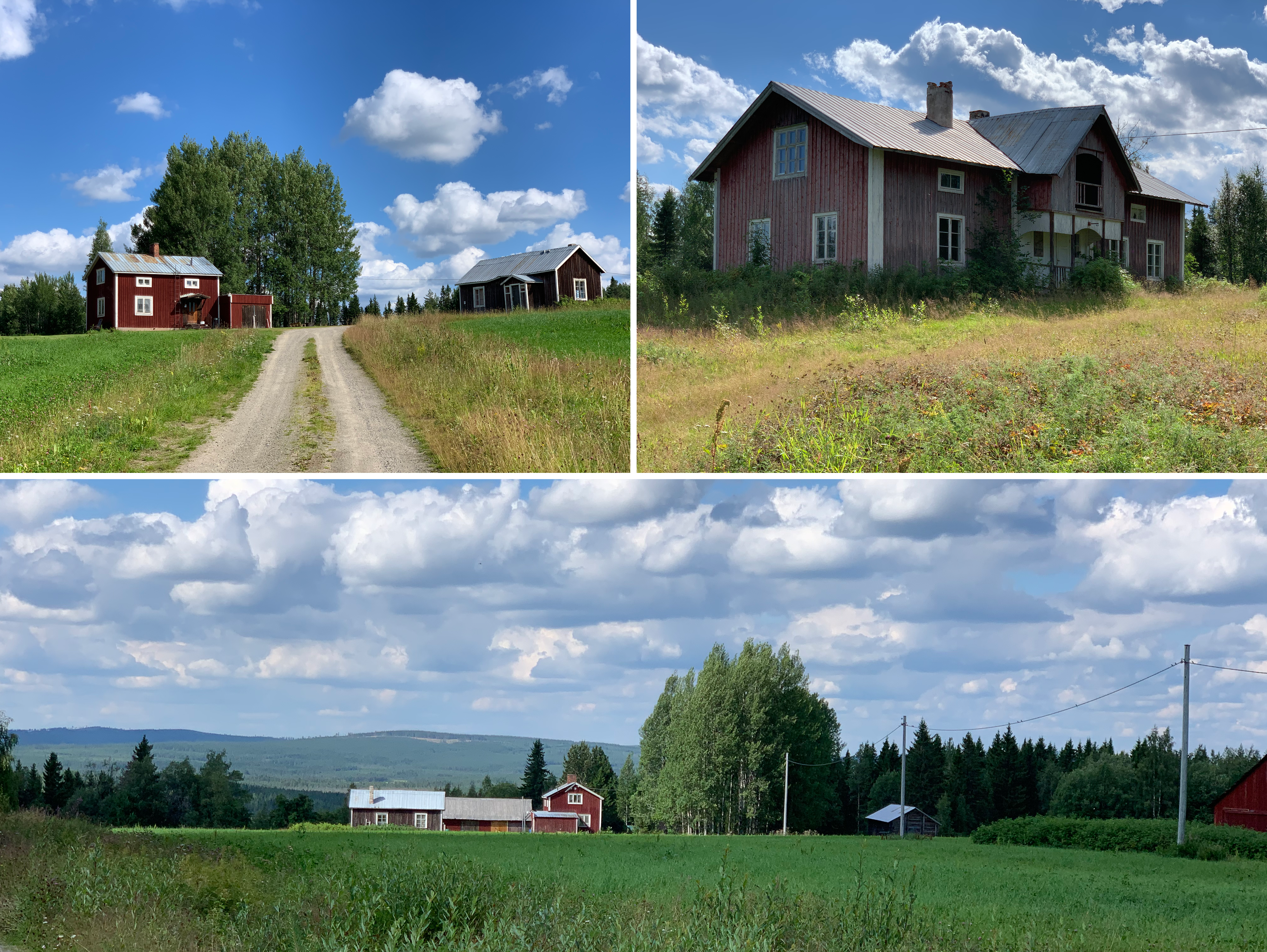
- Three distinct houses in Avaliden.

- Avaliden's location inside the Västerbotten county
- Coordinates: 64°52′20.2″N 19°25′15.3″E
- Country: Sweden
- Municipality: Norsjö
- Time zone: UTC+01:00 (CET)
  - Summer (DST): UTC+02:00 (CEST)
- Zip code: 935 91

Avaliden is a village in the municipality of Norsjö in Västerbotten County, Sweden. It is located approximately 7 km south of Norsjö. Although Avaliden is only seasonally inhabited now, its population in 1846 was 211.
