= Results of the 1928 Swedish general election =

Sweden held a general election around 15 September 1928 to the second chamber.

== Results ==
Party	Votes	%	Seats	+/–
Swedish Social Democratic Party	873,931	37.05	90	–14
General Electoral League	692,434	29.36	73	+8
Free-minded National Association	303,995	12.89	28	–1
Farmers' League	263,501	11.17	27	+4
Communist Party	151,567	6.43	8	+4
Liberal Party	70,820	3.00	4	0
Other parties	2,563	0.11	0	0
Total	2,358,811	100.00	230	0
Valid votes	2,358,811	99.81		
Invalid/blank votes	4,490	0.19		
Total votes	2,363,301	100.00		
Registered voters/turnout	3,505,672	67.41		
Source: Nohlen & Stöver

== Regional results ==
=== Percentage share ===
Location	Share	Votes	S	AV	F	B	K	LP	Other	Left	Right
Götaland	50.5	1,191,145	35.0	33.4	10.5	13.8	3.5	3.8	0.0	38.5	61.5
Svealand	34.0	802,368	40.8	26.0	13.6	7.4	9.0	3.0	0.3	49.8	50.0
Norrland	15.5	365,298	35.4	23.6	19.1	10.8	10.5	0.6	0.0	46.0	54.0
Total	100.0	2,358,811	37.0	29.4	12.9	11.2	6.4	3.0	0.1	43.5	56.4
Source: SCB

=== By votes ===
Location	Share	Votes	S	AV	F	B	K	LP	Other	Left	Right
Götaland	50.5	1,191,145	416,889	397,972	125,192	164,591	41,230	44,733	538	458,119	732,488
Svealand	34.0	802,368	327,625	208,331	109,120	59,483	71,843	23,954	2,012	399,468	400,888
Norrland	15.5	365,298	129,417	86,131	69,683	39,427	38,494	2,133	13	167,911	197,374
Total	100.0	2,358,811	873,931	692,434	303,995	263,501	151,567	70,820	2,563	1,025,498	1,330,750
Source: SCB

== Constituency results ==
=== Percentage share ===
Location	Land	Share	Votes	S	AV	F	B	K	LP	Other	Left	Right	Margin
Location		%		%	%	%	%	%	%	%	%	%	
Blekinge	G	2.2	51,433	38.8	37.6	14.0	6.4	3.2	0.0	0.0	42.0	58.0	8,235
Bohuslän	G	3.2	74,351	33.8	37.2	4.5	9.4	3.7	11.4	0.0	37.5	62.5	18,522
Gothenburg	G	4.2	99,240	45.1	29.4	2.2	0.0	9.0	14.3	0.0	54.1	45.9	8,118
Gotland	G	0.9	21,749	17.1	22.1	17.9	42.9	0.0	0.0	0.0	17.1	82.9	14,321
Gävleborg	N	4.0	93,435	43.4	12.9	14.4	15.3	14.0	0.0	0.0	57.4	42.6	13,813
Halland	G	2.6	61,459	25.7	35.9	3.9	25.1	3.9	5.0	0.5	29.6	69.9	24,718
Jämtland	N	2.0	47,667	34.4	23.5	23.0	13.1	5.0	1.0	0.0	39.5	60.5	10,034
Jönköping	G	3.9	92,864	27.1	31.6	21.9	15.9	2.9	0.6	0.0	30.0	69.9	37,059
Kalmar	G	3.5	82,093	24.2	45.9	8.3	15.8	5.3	0.5	0.0	29.5	70.5	33,626
Kopparberg	S	3.9	93,050	41.2	14.8	23.7	10.5	9.8	0.0	0.0	51.0	48.9	1,941
Kristianstad	G	3.8	89,891	33.8	26.7	23.2	15.1	1.2	0.0	0.0	35.0	65.0	26,991
Kronoberg	G	2.6	61,963	25.0	48.2	9.0	12.8	5.0	0.0	0.0	30.0	70.0	24,758
Malmö area	G	4.0	95,107	54.9	34.9	8.1	0.0	2.1	0.0	0.0	57.0	43.0	13,272
Malmöhus	G	5.1	120,129	45.7	17.4	3.1	25.4	0.4	8.0	0.0	46.2	53.8	9,233
Norrbotten	N	2.4	57,599	26.1	35.0	11.6	5.6	21.7	0.0	0.0	47.8	52.2	2,503
Skaraborg	G	4.0	94,849	25.6	37.6	16.5	17.0	2.2	0.9	0.2	27.8	72.0	41,872
Stockholm	S	9.5	223,012	37.6	39.0	4.6	0.0	12.2	6.5	0.0	49.8	50.1	753
Stockholm County	S	4.3	101,407	39.3	29.5	9.0	9.8	9.5	2.9	0.0	48.8	51.2	2,431
Södermanland	S	3.2	74,335	48.8	18.5	17.2	11.4	2.7	0.0	1.4	51.5	47.1	3,318
Uppsala	S	2.3	54,982	37.8	22.9	12.9	15.4	5.3	5.7	0.0	43.2	56.8	7,526
Värmland	S	4.6	109,436	40.7	22.4	17.9	7.0	10.8	1.2	0.0	51.5	48.5	3,212
Västerbotten	N	2.9	69,189	23.4	35.4	40.2	0.0	1.0	0.0	0.0	24.4	75.6	35,481
Västernorrland	N	4.1	97,408	42.3	18.7	11.0	16.2	10.1	1.7	0.0	52.4	47.6	4,742
Västmanland	S	2.7	62,872	45.3	18.1	16.2	13.4	7.0	0.0	0.0	52.3	47.7	2,880
Älvsborg N	G	2.9	67,817	34.0	26.9	12.6	17.3	6.8	2.4	0.0	36.4	63.6	18,506
Älvsborg S	G	2.4	56,682	25.4	46.7	10.4	14.9	2.6	0.0	0.0	28.0	72.0	24,974
Örebro	S	3.5	83,274	42.7	18.5	21.7	8.2	5.6	2.4	0.9	48.3	50.8	2,061
Östergötland	G	5.2	121,518	39.2	32.5	9.3	11.0	5.5	2.5	0.0	44.7	55.3	12,944
Total		100.0	2,358,811	37.0	29.4	12.9	11.2	6.4	3.0	0.1	43.5	56.4	305,252
Source: SCB

=== By votes ===
Location	Land	Share	Votes	S	AV	F	B	K	LP	Other	Left	Right	Margin
Location		%											
Blekinge	G	2.2	51,433	19,931	19,333	7,187	3,311	1,665		6	21,596	29,831	8,235
Bohuslän	G	3.2	74,351	25,171	27,659	3,363	6,958	2,742	8,455	3	27,913	46,435	18,522
Gothenburg	G	4.2	99,240	44,800	29,220	2,156		8,877	14,183	4	53,677	45,559	8,118
Gotland	G	0.9	21,749	3,714	4,799	3,903	9,333				3,714	18,035	14,321
Gävleborg	N	4.0	93,435	40,578	12,082	13,454	14,273	13,044		4	53,622	39,809	13,813
Halland	G	2.6	61,459	15,818	22,052	2,373	15,410	2,401	3,102	303	18,219	42,937	24,718
Jämtland	N	2.0	47,667	16,420	11,177	10,947	6,236	2,396	490	1	18,816	28,850	10,034
Jönköping	G	3.9	92,864	25,160	29,363	20,297	14,781	2,735	513	15	27,895	64,954	37,059
Kalmar	G	3.5	82,093	19,903	37,656	6,803	12,997	4,328	401	5	24,231	57,857	33,626
Kopparberg	S	3.9	93,050	38,315	13,758	22,024	9,764	9,172		17	47,487	45,546	1,941
Kristianstad	G	3.8	89,891	30,413	24,008	20,846	13,584	1,034		6	31,447	58,438	26,991
Kronoberg	G	2.6	61,963	15,518	29,855	5,558	7,947	3,084		1	18,602	43,360	24,758
Malmö area	G	4.0	95,107	52,211	33,238	7,677		1,976		5	54,187	40,915	13,272
Malmöhus	G	5.1	120,129	54,943	20,919	3,656	30,537	503	9,567	4	55,446	64,679	9,233
Norrbotten	N	2.4	57,599	15,026	20,180	6,675	3,194	12,520		4	27,546	30,049	2,503
Skaraborg	G	4.0	94,849	24,281	35,659	15,659	16,125	2,120	830	175	26,401	68,273	41,872
Stockholm	S	9.5	223,012	83,875	87,078	10,218		27,152	14,484	205	111,027	111,780	753
Stockholm County	S	4.3	101,407	39,809	29,891	9,118	9,941	9,668	2,958	22	49,477	51,908	2,431
Södermanland	S	3.2	74,335	36,281	13,759	12,737	8,493	2,026		1,039	38,307	34,989	3,318
Uppsala	S	2.3	54,982	20,805	12,574	7,109	8,435	2,923	3,136		23,728	31,254	7,526
Värmland	S	4.6	109,436	44,506	24,472	19,644	7,648	11,815	1,345	6	56,321	53,109	3,212
Västerbotten	N	2.9	69,189	16,166	24,478	27,855		686		4	16,852	52,333	35,481
Västernorrland	N	4.1	97,408	41,227	18,214	10,752	15,724	9,848	1,643		51,075	46,333	4,742
Västmanland	S	2.7	62,872	28,482	11,372	10,216	8,403	4,389		10	32,871	29,991	2,880
Älvsborg N	G	2.9	67,817	23,031	18,226	8,556	11,759	1,623	4,619	3	24,654	43,160	18,506
Älvsborg S	G	2.4	56,682	14,387	26,475	5,878	8,473	1,465		4	15,852	40,826	24,974
Örebro	S	3.5	83,274	35,552	15,427	18,054	6,799	4,698	2,031	713	40,250	42,311	2,061
Östergötland	G	5.2	121,518	47,608	39,510	11,280	13,376	6,677	3,063	4	54,285	67,229	12,944
Total		100.0	2,358,811	873,931	692,434	303,995	263,501	151,567	70,820	2,563	1,025,498	1,330,750	305,252
Source: SCB

== Results by city and district ==
=== Blekinge ===
Location	Share	Votes	S	AV	F	B	K	L-vote	R-vote	Left	Right	Margin
Location	%		%	%	%	%	%	%	%	%	%	
Bräkne	15.1	7,752	43.1	29.9	6.9	15.6	4.4	3,683	4,069	47.5	52.5	386
Karlshamn	6.1	3,162	37.9	49.5	10.1	0.4	2.1	1,262	1,895	39.9	59.9	633
Karlskrona	18.1	9,289	41.2	44.9	11.7	0.1	2.1	4,025	5,264	43.3	56.7	1,239
Lister	18.0	9,260	33.3	40.2	17.3	5.7	3.6	3,411	5,849	36.8	63.2	2,438
Medelstad	20.1	10,334	39.6	35.2	13.6	7.6	4.0	4,504	5,830	43.6	56.4	1,326
Ronneby	4.6	2,342	45.7	40.9	10.2	0.3	2.9	1,139	1,203	48.6	51.4	64
Sölvesborg	3.0	1,550	38.1	34.2	20.5	0.2	7.1	700	850	45.2	54.8	150
Östra	14.2	7,292	36.1	29.5	22.1	10.4	1.9	2,775	4,517	38.1	61.9	1,742
Postal vote	0.9	452						97	354			257
Total	2.2	51,433	38.8	37.6	14.0	6.4	3.2	21,596	29,831	42.0	58.0	8,235
Source: SCB

=== Gothenburg and Bohuslän ===
==== Bohuslän ====
Location	Share	Votes	S	AV	F	B	K	LP	L-vote	R-vote	Left	Right	Margin
Location	%		%	%	%	%	%	%	%	%	%	%	
Askim	9.4	6,983	38.5	24.4	9.8	11.0	6.8	9.8	3,161	3,822	45.3	54.7	661
Bullaren	0.9	637	2.2	50.7	3.3	25.4	0.0	18.4	14	623	2.2	97.8	609
Inlands Fräkne	2.3	1,673	15.8	48.1	3.5	12.1	0.0	20.5	264	1,409	15.8	84.2	1,145
Inlands Nordre	5.3	3,970	12.8	55.3	2.6	16.7	0.4	12.1	525	3,444	13.2	86.8	2,919
Inlands Södre	4.0	2,954	10.9	55.6	1.0	26.3	0.2	6.0	328	2,626	11.1	88.9	2,298
Inlands Torpe	2.3	1,682	52.4	20.5	1.6	17.5	0.7	7.3	894	788	53.2	46.8	106
Kungälv	1.3	971	47.2	42.9	2.0	0.9	0.3	3.6	461	510	47.5	52.5	49
Kville	2.3	1,739	34.6	31.2	1.0	14.7	0.4	18.1	609	1,130	35.0	65.0	521
Lane	3.7	2,737	20.1	46.0	0.9	11.2	0.4	21.5	561	2,176	20.5	79.5	1,615
Lysekil	2.7	1,973	43.6	45.9	4.0	0.0	2.4	4.2	908	1,065	46.0	54.0	157
Marstrand	0.7	499	29.7	57.9	4.8	0.0	0.2	7.4	149	350	29.9	70.1	201
Mölndal	8.4	6,231	59.8	13.4	2.8	2.0	14.8	7.2	4,647	1,584	74.6	25.4	3,063
Orust Västra	4.9	3,655	7.3	64.8	1.5	10.0	0.0	16.3	268	3,387	7.3	92.7	3,119
Orust Östra	2.1	1,595	10.8	51.3	1.9	13.2	0.1	22.8	173	1,422	10.8	89.2	1,249
Sotenäs	6.3	4,650	45.1	26.7	6.4	0.9	5.7	15.1	2,366	2,284	50.9	49.1	82
Strömstad	1.4	1,044	27.1	52.1	10.2	0.0	7.0	3.5	356	688	34.1	65.9	332
Stångenäs	5.9	4,387	49.3	38.4	0.8	2.3	2.0	7.3	2,251	2,136	51.3	48.7	115
Sävedal	5.0	3,691	43.2	21.2	3.8	13.8	9.8	3.8	1,958	1,733	53.0	47.0	225
Sörbygden	1.9	1,400	0.9	77.7	0.0	15.0	0.0	6.4	12	1,388	0.9	99.1	1,376
Tanum	3.3	2,462	25.0	53.7	3.5	8.9	0.3	8.6	623	1,839	25.3	74.7	1,216
Tjörn	3.3	2,450	6.4	36.6	13.5	8.7	0.0	34.8	158	2,292	6.4	93.6	2,134
Tunge	4.1	3,012	42.8	31.2	1.0	9.8	0.2	15.1	1,293	1,719	42.9	57.1	426
Uddevalla	7.9	5,886	52.0	30.2	3.1	0.0	2.0	12.7	3,176	2,709	54.0	46.0	467
Vette	4.3	3,219	48.1	27.4	2.4	10.4	5.2	6.5	1,715	1,504	53.3	46.7	211
Västra Hising	6.0	4,424	17.9	43.2	16.3	16.4	3.2	2.9	934	3,490	21.1	78.9	2,556
Östra Hising	0.5	345	24.6	20.6	0.3	48.7	4.1	1.7	99	246	28.7	71.3	147
Postal vote	0.1	82							10	71			61
Total	3.2	74,351	33.8	37.2	4.5	9.4	3.7	11.4	27,913	46,435	37.5	62.5	18,522
Source: SCB

==== Gothenburg ====
Location	Share	Votes	S	AV	F	K	LP	L-vote	R-vote	Left	Right	Margin
Location	%		%	%	%	%	%	%	%	%	%	
Gothenburg	100.0	99,240	45.1	29.4	2.2	9.0	14.3	53,677	45,559	54.1	45.9	8,118
Total	4.2	99,240	45.1	29.4	2.2	9.0	14.3	53,677	45,559	54.1	45.9	8,118
Source: SCB

=== Gotland ===
Location	Share	Votes	S	AV	F	B	L-vote	R-vote	Left	Right	Margin
Location	%		%	%	%	%	%	%	%	%	
Gotland Norra	40.4	8,794	18.5	16.6	12.4	52.4	1,625	7,169	18.5	81.5	5,544
Gotland Södra	41.2	8,962	6.3	14.4	27.0	52.3	565	8,397	6.3	93.7	7,832
Visby	18.3	3,971	38.2	51.1	9.7	1.0	1,518	2,453	38.2	61.8	935
Postal vote	0.1	22					6	16			10
Total	0.9	21,749	17.1	22.1	17.9	42.9	3,714	18,035	17.1	82.9	14,321
Source: SCB

=== Gävleborg ===
Location	Share	Votes	S	AV	F	B	K	L-vote	R-vote	Left	Right	Margin
Location	%		%	%	%	%	%	%	%	%	%	
Ala	9.8	9,197	48.8	4.6	7.8	18.6	20.1	6,343	2,854	69.0	31.0	3,489
Bergsjö-Forsa	10.3	9,645	27.5	9.2	16.0	32.6	14.7	4,069	5,575	42.2	57.8	1,506
Bollnäs	13.0	12,183	41.6	8.8	17.7	20.2	11.7	6,488	5,693	53.3	46.7	795
Delsbo	3.8	3,506	30.0	10.5	5.7	47.6	6.2	1,271	2,235	36.3	63.7	964
Enånger	2.9	2,724	33.0	7.0	13.1	20.3	26.5	1,621	1,103	59.5	40.5	518
Gästrikland Västra	10.5	9,839	39.6	10.8	17.0	13.8	18.8	5,750	4,089	58.4	41.6	1,661
Gästrikland Östra	15.4	14,367	53.0	7.2	17.4	6.0	16.4	9,967	4,400	69.4	30.6	5,567
Gävle	14.2	13,313	51.4	26.5	15.4	0.1	6.7	7,734	5,579	58.1	41.9	2,155
Hudiksvall	3.3	3,037	24.8	34.9	16.7	1.8	21.8	1,415	1,622	46.6	53.4	207
Söderhamn	4.4	4,099	49.1	25.9	9.9	0.3	14.8	2,619	1,480	63.9	36.1	1,139
Västra Hälsingland	12.3	11,478	46.0	12.0	11.6	21.3	9.1	6,328	5,149	55.1	44.9	1,179
Postal vote	0.1	47						17	30			13
Total	4.0	93,435	43.4	12.9	14.4	15.3	14.0	53,622	39,809	57.4	42.6	13,813
Source: SCB

=== Halland ===
Location	Share	Votes	S	AV	F	B	K	LP	L-vote	R-vote	Left	Right	Margin
Location	%		%	%	%	%	%	%	%	%	%	%	
Falkenberg	3.9	2,394	34.9	39.0	4.3	1.6	9.6	9.6	1,065	1,304	44.5	54.5	239
Faurås	10.6	6,486	13.4	36.6	2.0	43.3	1.5	2.9	965	5,499	14.9	84.8	4,534
Fjäre	11.9	7,302	14.4	41.2	1.0	40.6	0.5	1.7	1,090	6,170	14.9	84.5	5,080
Halmstad	16.2	9,963	42.8	32.3	4.8	0.3	12.3	7.0	5,490	4,417	55.1	44.3	1,073
Halmstad Hundred	10.9	6,696	34.3	37.4	3.0	16.5	3.1	5.4	2,505	4,173	37.4	62.3	1,668
Himle	7.7	4,715	11.5	38.6	7.6	34.1	1.1	6.2	594	4,081	12.6	86.6	3,487
Hök	11.6	7,119	18.9	21.5	2.4	50.5	0.8	5.5	1,405	5,692	19.7	80.0	4,287
Kungsbacka	1.5	916	33.8	56.3	3.8	1.3	0.5	4.0	315	600	34.4	65.5	285
Laholm	1.9	1,147	32.7	41.3	3.9	12.6	1.1	7.7	388	751	33.8	65.5	363
Tönnersjö	7.2	4,440	32.8	31.8	7.0	17.5	5.1	5.2	1,682	2,738	37.9	61.7	1,056
Varberg	5.8	3,554	40.1	37.1	8.2	1.3	5.4	7.3	1,615	1,914	45.4	53.9	299
Viske	3.7	2,280	10.1	36.3	6.1	41.7	0.1	5.4	232	2,042	10.2	89.6	1,810
Årstad	7.2	4,425	18.5	47.2	0.8	30.1	1.1	1.9	868	3,539	19.6	80.0	2,671
Postal vote	0.0	22							5	17			12
Total	2.6	61,459	25.7	35.9	3.9	25.1	3.9	5.0	18,219	42,937	29.6	69.9	24,718
Source: SCB

=== Jämtland ===
Location	Share	Votes	S	AV	F	B	K	LP	L-vote	R-vote	Left	Right	Margin
Location	%		%	%	%	%	%	%	%	%	%	%	
Berg	4.7	2,224	29.4	19.3	35.0	12.9	3.1	0.3	723	1,501	32.5	67.5	778
Hammerdal	11.9	5,680	32.6	25.8	17.1	17.1	6.5	0.7	2,226	3,453	39.2	60.8	1,227
Hede	3.1	1,485	23.2	12.9	38.3	7.7	17.8	0.1	609	876	41.0	59.0	267
Lits-Rödön	16.1	7,658	30.8	16.1	28.8	18.9	5.1	0.4	2,744	4,914	35.8	64.2	2,170
Ragunda	11.6	5,551	45.5	25.3	10.3	13.6	4.7	0.5	2,788	2,763	50.2	49.8	25
Revsund-Brunflo-Näs	13.4	6,398	35.4	25.0	21.3	13.2	3.5	1.7	2,492	3,906	38.9	61.1	1,414
Sunne-Oviken-Hallen	8.1	3,839	21.3	21.2	38.4	17.3	1.5	0.3	875	2,964	22.8	77.2	2,089
Sveg	6.7	3,209	48.1	17.3	12.1	6.7	10.5	5.3	1,878	1,331	58.5	41.5	547
Undersåker-Offerdal	12.9	6,134	33.8	18.5	30.5	13.5	3.2	0.6	2,268	3,866	37.0	63.0	1,598
Östersund	11.5	5,461	36.2	42.8	13.9	1.9	4.2	1.0	2,205	3,256	40.4	59.6	1,051
Postal vote	0.1	28							8	20			12
Total	2.0	47,667	34.4	23.5	23.0	13.1	5.0	1.0	18,816	28,850	39.5	60.5	10,034
Source: SCB

=== Jönköping ===
Location	Share	Votes	S	AV	F	B	K	LP	L-vote	R-vote	Left	Right	Margin
Location	%		%	%	%	%	%	%	%	%	%	%	
Eksjö	2.8	2,559	33.1	42.8	16.4	2.5	0.9	4.3	868	1,691	33.9	66.1	823
Gränna	0.6	568	13.2	55.3	27.8	1.9	1.4	0.4	83	485	14.6	85.4	402
Huskvarna	3.8	3,547	50.8	25.0	14.2	0.1	9.5	0.5	2,138	1,409	60.3	39.7	729
Jönköping	13.3	12,372	42.3	34.5	20.6	0.2	1.5	0.9	5,423	6,946	43.8	56.1	1,523
Mo	3.2	2,944	8.9	46.1	28.1	16.7	0.1	0.0	266	2,678	9.0	91.0	2,412
Norra Vedbo	6.1	5,690	18.9	37.2	25.3	16.6	1.7	0.2	1,174	4,515	20.6	79.3	3,341
Nässjö	3.9	3,599	48.5	27.0	18.0	0.9	5.0	0.6	1,925	1,674	53.5	46.5	251
Södra Vedbo	6.9	6,406	24.0	19.5	22.1	30.7	3.1	0.6	1,736	4,669	27.1	72.9	2,933
Tranås	2.8	2,575	37.7	25.7	30.9	0.0	4.6	1.0	1,090	1,484	42.3	57.6	394
Tveta	9.1	8,474	32.9	29.4	18.9	15.8	2.8	0.2	3,026	5,447	35.7	64.3	2,421
Vetlanda	1.6	1,482	36.3	33.9	19.6	0.7	7.5	2.0	649	833	43.8	56.2	184
Vista	2.9	2,678	7.0	54.9	10.7	26.7	0.6	0.1	204	2,474	7.6	92.4	2,270
Värnamo	1.7	1,600	37.3	35.0	22.0	0.6	4.9	0.3	675	925	42.2	57.8	250
Västbo	13.4	12,440	23.2	29.1	17.5	27.6	2.2	0.4	3,156	9,281	25.4	74.6	6,125
Västra	10.8	10,059	18.2	24.3	25.9	27.6	3.7	0.3	2,203	7,854	21.9	78.1	5,651
Östbo	8.5	7,931	17.3	42.6	22.7	14.2	3.0	0.1	1,606	6,322	20.2	79.7	4,716
Östra	8.5	7,900	17.9	24.5	30.8	23.2	3.3	0.4	1,669	6,231	21.1	78.9	4,562
Postal vote	0.0	40							4	36			32
Total	3.9	92,864	27.1	31.6	21.9	15.9	2.9	0.6	27,895	64,954	30.0	69.9	37,059
Source: SCB

=== Kalmar ===
Location	Share	Votes	S	AV	F	B	K	LP	L-vote	R-vote	Left	Right	Margin
Location	%		%	%	%	%	%	%	%	%	%	%	
Algutsrum	2.6	2,167	17.5	57.3	1.3	23.4	0.4	0.0	388	1,778	17.9	82.0	1,390
Aspeland	6.0	4,926	24.3	39.1	13.4	20.8	1.9	0.4	1,289	3,637	26.2	73.8	2,348
Borgholm	0.6	486	21.0	47.7	24.1	7.0	0.2	0.0	103	383	21.2	78.8	280
Gräsgård	1.9	1,542	28.3	42.0	1.9	26.8	0.3	0.7	441	1,101	28.6	71.4	660
Handbörd	6.6	5,385	23.2	49.5	7.1	10.7	9.3	0.2	1,750	3,634	32.5	67.5	1,884
Kalmar	8.7	7,116	40.2	50.1	3.9	1.3	3.6	0.9	3,119	3,997	43.8	56.2	878
Möckleby	1.4	1,174	2.8	80.3	0.4	16.3	0.0	0.2	33	1,141	2.8	97.2	1,108
Norra Möre	5.0	4,080	21.2	55.1	2.5	16.7	3.8	0.7	1,019	3,061	25.0	75.0	2,042
Norra Tjust	7.1	5,850	26.4	50.3	8.1	10.9	3.6	0.6	1,757	4,090	30.0	69.9	2,333
Oskarshamn	4.3	3,571	42.3	33.2	14.0	0.0	9.0	1.5	1,832	1,739	51.3	48.7	93
Runsten	1.6	1,334	1.9	35.5	1.2	61.4	0.0	0.0	25	1,309	1.9	98.1	1,284
Sevede	7.0	5,737	17.1	46.8	13.9	18.6	3.5	0.1	1,185	4,552	20.7	79.3	3,367
Slättbo	1.4	1,153	18.5	31.1	1.6	46.4	2.3	0.0	240	913	20.8	79.2	673
Stranda	6.9	5,644	27.2	34.5	8.2	16.6	13.1	0.4	2,277	3,367	40.3	59.7	1,090
Södra Möre	17.3	14,168	22.9	49.8	5.7	17.1	4.2	0.3	3,832	10,336	27.0	73.0	6,504
Södra Tjust	8.7	7,142	29.0	36.4	9.4	17.7	6.8	0.6	2,563	4,579	35.9	64.1	2,016
Tunalän	4.6	3,762	13.2	57.6	11.2	13.8	3.7	0.5	637	3,125	16.9	83.1	2,488
Vimmerby	1.6	1,277	17.9	58.8	21.0	1.0	1.3	0.0	245	1,032	19.2	80.8	787
Västervik	4.6	3,788	21.9	44.5	18.7	0.1	13.8	0.9	1,353	2,435	35.7	64.3	1,082
Åkerbo	2.1	1,720	5.3	16.5	3.7	72.6	1.9	0.0	124	1,596	7.2	92.8	1,472
Postal vote	0.1	71							19	52			33
Total	3.5	82,093	24.2	45.9	8.3	15.8	5.3	0.5	24,231	57,857	29.5	70.5	33,626
Source: SCB

=== Kopparberg ===
Location	Share	Votes	S	AV	F	B	K	L-vote	R-vote	Left	Right	Margin
Location	%		%	%	%	%	%	%	%	%	%	
Avesta	2.1	1,995	55.0	13.4	12.5	0.0	19.0	1,478	517	74.1	25.9	961
Falu Norra	8.4	7,817	40.1	12.1	28.0	8.5	11.2	4,014	3,803	51.3	48.7	211
Falu Södra	12.7	11,772	45.8	10.9	14.6	16.3	12.5	6,861	4,911	58.3	41.7	1,950
Falun	5.1	4,734	33.3	42.6	19.8	0.3	4.0	1,766	2,966	37.3	62.7	1,200
Folkare	6.8	6,351	42.1	17.9	17.8	12.8	9.4	3,271	3,079	51.5	48.5	192
Hedemora	1.6	1,518	34.3	35.0	25.6	2.4	2.6	561	957	37.0	63.0	396
Hedemora ting	8.5	7,893	44.6	8.8	13.8	27.7	5.1	3,923	3,970	49.7	50.3	47
Leksand-Gagnef	9.4	8,738	23.7	11.4	48.8	10.9	5.1	2,523	6,212	28.9	71.1	3,689
Ludvika	2.4	2,226	57.1	23.9	8.8	0.3	9.9	1,492	734	67.0	33.0	758
Malung	6.0	5,579	44.0	6.5	31.7	1.6	7.2	2,853	2,725	51.1	48.8	128
Mora	6.8	6,358	27.5	19.7	36.2	8.9	7.6	2,231	4,123	35.1	64.8	1,892
Nås	6.3	5,854	41.3	9.6	16.1	14.3	18.6	3,509	2,344	59.9	40.0	1,165
Orsa	3.2	3,022	41.5	15.8	23.5	12.7	6.4	1,448	1,574	47.9	52.1	126
Rättvik	4.2	3,933	25.1	9.1	40.4	12.5	13.0	1,499	2,434	38.1	61.9	935
Särna-Idre	0.8	784	46.6	11.0	37.4	0.3	4.8	403	381	51.4	48.6	22
Säter	1.0	929	53.2	28.7	16.4	0.0	1.7	510	419	54.9	45.1	91
Västerbergslag	12.3	11,402	55.0	10.1	13.0	6.8	15.1	7,992	3,405	70.1	29.9	4,587
Älvdalen	2.2	2,091	49.9	16.0	29.9	0.7	3.5	1,116	975	53.4	46.6	141
Postal vote	0.1	54						37	17			20
Total	4.2	93,050	41.2	14.8	23.7	10.5	9.8	47,487	45,546	51.0	48.9	1,941
Source: SCB

=== Kristianstad ===
Location	Share	Votes	S	AV	F	B	K	L-vote	R-vote	Left	Right	Margin
Location	%		%	%	%	%	%	%	%	%	%	
Albo	3.5	3,105	22.3	21.8	47.5	6.8	1.6	741	2,364	23.9	76.1	1,623
Bjäre	6.2	5,591	23.3	43.6	7.2	26.0	0.0	1,302	4,289	23.3	76.7	2,987
Gärd	9.5	8,531	39.8	18.4	36.5	4.8	0.4	3,433	5,098	40.2	59.8	1,665
Hässleholm	1.6	1,435	41.4	35.7	22.3	0.6	0.0	594	841	41.4	58.6	247
Ingelstad	10.3	9,222	29.0	19.5	34.7	16.8	0.0	2,671	6,546	29.0	71.0	3,875
Järrestad	3.5	3,175	39.6	17.8	28.5	14.0	0.1	1,261	1,914	39.7	60.3	653
Kristianstad	5.9	5,305	38.8	39.3	19.4	0.4	2.1	2,169	3,136	40.9	59.1	967
Norra Åsbo	11.8	10,627	30.7	32.5	11.3	25.3	0.2	3,280	7,346	30.9	69.1	4,066
Simrishamn	1.2	1,094	42.8	41.7	12.6	0.2	2.7	498	596	45.5	54.5	98
Södra Åsbo	6.8	6,109	44.4	28.9	6.6	19.8	0.3	2,730	3,379	44.7	55.3	649
Villand	9.4	8,456	45.0	23.7	21.6	6.1	3.5	4,106	4,350	48.6	51.4	244
Västra Göinge	15.1	13,616	23.0	21.4	30.1	25.4	0.2	3,161	10,455	23.2	76.8	7,294
Ängelholm	2.8	2,489	51.9	43.0	4.7	0.3	0.0	1,292	1,197	51.9	48.1	95
Östra Göinge	12.3	11,082	34.0	24.0	23.7	14.4	3.9	4,200	6,882	37.9	62.1	2,682
Postal vote	0.1	54						9	45			36
Total	3.8	89,891	33.8	26.7	23.2	15.1	1.2	31,447	58,438	35.0	65.0	26,991
Source: SCB

=== Kronoberg ===
Location	Share	Votes	S	AV	F	B	K	L-vote	R-vote	Left	Right	Margin
Location	%		%	%	%	%	%	%	%	%	%	
Allbo	18.8	11,668	24.7	52.4	8.4	11.5	3.1	3,234	8,434	27.7	72.3	5,200
Kinnevald	10.2	6,350	19.6	63.8	5.3	9.8	1.5	1,340	5,010	21.1	78.9	3,670
Konga	18.8	11,668	26.2	47.2	7.5	10.2	7.5	3,986	7,682	34.2	65.8	3,696
Norrvidinge	5.2	3,225	20.4	53.5	8.9	15.4	1.8	717	2,508	22.2	77.8	1,791
Sunnerbo	23.7	14,664	18.8	47.3	12.2	19.5	2.3	3,081	11,582	21.0	79.0	8,501
Uppvidinge	16.6	10,306	34.3	31.6	9.5	13.8	10.8	4,644	5,662	45.1	54.9	1,018
Växjö	6.6	4,063	33.2	53.5	7.0	0.3	6.0	1,594	2,469	39.2	60.8	875
Postal vote	0.0	19						6	13			7
Total	2.6	61,963	25.0	48.2	9.0	12.8	5.0	18,602	43,360	30.0	70.0	24,758
Source: SCB

=== Malmöhus ===
==== Malmö area ====
Location	Share	Votes	S	AV	F	K	L-vote	R-vote	Left	Right	Margin
Location	%		%	%	%	%	%	%	%	%	
Hälsingborg	24.0	22,797	51.1	37.9	8.4	2.7	12,261	10,535	53.8	46.2	1,726
Landskrona	8.7	8,310	62.7	31.3	5.1	0.9	5,288	3,022	63.6	36.4	2,266
Lund	11.9	11,352	48.8	39.2	10.3	1.7	5,728	5,623	50.5	49.5	105
Malmö	55.3	52,551	56.7	33.3	7.9	2.1	30,883	21,667	58.8	41.2	9,216
Postal vote	0.1	97					27	68			41
Total	4.0	95,107	54.9	34.9	8.1	2.1	54,187	40,915	57.0	43.0	13,272
Source: SCB

==== Malmöhus County ====
Location	Share	Votes	S	AV	F	B	K	LP	L-vote	R-vote	Left	Right	Margin
Location	%		%	%	%	%	%	%	%	%	%	%	
Bara	8.0	9,620	56.3	16.1	1.3	22.8	0.2	3.3	5,438	4,182	56.5	43.5	1,256
Eslöv	2.3	2,744	47.5	37.8	3.7	1.2	1.7	8.0	1,352	1,392	49.3	50.7	40
Frosta	8.1	9,770	24.4	16.7	4.6	27.6	0.1	26.6	2,386	7,384	24.4	75.6	4,998
Färs	7.6	9,182	27.2	14.0	4.7	25.6	0.0	28.6	2,494	6,688	27.2	72.8	4,194
Harjager	4.6	5,547	43.1	15.6	2.0	35.4	0.6	3.3	2,425	3,122	43.7	56.3	697
Herrestad	2.4	2,883	53.1	10.2	2.1	15.6	0.0	19.1	1,531	1,352	53.1	46.9	179
Ljunit	2.1	2,465	41.5	12.3	3.6	24.6	0.0	17.9	1,025	1,440	41.6	58.4	415
Luggude	16.3	19,594	50.7	20.6	2.7	24.1	0.0	1.8	9,942	9,652	50.7	49.3	290
Onsjö	5.6	6,700	38.1	12.0	1.8	43.9	0.1	4.1	2,563	4,137	38.3	61.7	1,574
Oxie	9.8	11,800	62.0	13.1	2.2	20.0	1.1	1.7	7,439	4,360	63.0	36.9	3,079
Rönneberg	4.2	5,025	51.1	20.8	1.5	24.4	0.0	2.2	2,569	2,456	51.1	48.9	113
Skanör-Falsterbo	0.4	456	16.7	50.2	27.6	5.5	0.0	0.0	76	380	16.7	83.3	304
Skytt	5.0	6,002	38.5	17.7	1.9	38.2	0.6	3.1	2,345	3,657	39.1	60.9	1,312
Torna	7.4	8,890	41.3	13.7	1.7	38.8	0.0	4.6	3,674	5,215	41.3	58.7	1,541
Trälleborg	4.4	5,234	57.7	27.9	4.5	0.8	4.2	5.0	3,237	1,997	61.8	38.2	1,240
Vemmenhög	7.5	8,995	42.1	13.0	4.3	35.1	0.1	5.4	3,798	5,197	42.2	57.8	1,399
Ystad	4.3	5,177	60.7	26.5	5.5	0.5	0.0	6.8	3,140	2,036	60.7	39.3	1,104
Postal vote	0.0	45							12	32			20
Total	5.1	120,129	45.7	17.4	3.1	25.4	0.4	8.0	55,446	64,679	46.2	53.8	9,233
Source: SCB

=== Norrbotten ===
Location	Share	Votes	S	AV	F	B	K	L-vote	R-vote	Left	Right	Margin
Location	%		%	%	%	%	%	%	%	%	%	
Arjeplog	1.0	552	10.7	38.2	8.3	7.0	40.9	285	267	51.6	48.4	18
Arvidsjaur	3.5	2,006	11.1	28.1	22.4	7.0	31.4	853	1,153	42.5	57.5	300
Boden	4.6	2,654	31.2	39.8	10.0	0.2	18.9	1,328	1,326	50.0	50.0	2
Gällivare	9.9	5,720	23.5	40.5	2.3	0.2	33.4	3,258	2,462	57.0	43.0	796
Haparanda	1.6	939	18.2	57.9	8.9	0.0	14.9	311	628	33.1	66.9	317
Jokkmokk	2.7	1,551	12.3	25.6	18.8	4.4	38.8	793	758	51.1	48.9	35
Jukkasjärvi	9.4	5,388	31.8	26.0	5.4	0.1	36.8	3,692	1,696	68.5	31.5	1,996
Karesuando	0.2	143	0.0	92.3	4.9	0.0	2.8	4	139	2.8	97.2	135
Luleå	7.3	4,227	29.7	44.7	6.2	0.2	19.2	2,069	2,156	48.9	51.0	87
Nederkalix	10.1	5,827	34.1	34.3	10.6	6.1	14.9	2,855	2,972	49.0	51.0	117
Nederluleå	7.9	4,553	15.7	39.2	20.4	12.3	12.6	1,290	3,263	28.3	71.7	1,973
Pajala	3.6	2,094	12.6	58.5	11.9	0.4	16.6	612	1,482	29.2	70.8	870
Piteå	1.9	1,108	41.4	44.1	10.3	0.8	3.3	496	612	44.8	55.2	116
Piteå ting	14.2	8,194	36.6	22.8	9.5	16.4	14.6	4,200	3,994	51.3	48.7	206
Råneå	5.3	3,033	22.5	34.0	16.9	4.5	22.0	1,349	1,684	44.5	55.5	335
Torneå	6.5	3,750	20.5	44.5	15.4	1.4	18.1	1,449	2,301	38.6	61.4	852
Överkalix	3.1	1,795	35.8	16.0	11.5	14.7	22.0	1,037	758	57.8	42.2	279
Överluleå	6.9	3,979	17.6	32.2	21.5	5.5	23.2	1,626	2,353	40.9	59.1	727
Postal vote	0.1	86						39	45			6
Total	2.4	57,599	26.1	35.0	11.6	5.6	21.7	27,546	30,049	47.8	52.2	2,503
Source: SCB

=== Skaraborg ===
Location	Share	Votes	S	AV	F	B	K	LP	L-vote	R-vote	Left	Right	Margin
Location	%		%	%	%	%	%	%	%	%	%	%	
Barne	5.3	4,986	10.4	53.3	17.6	17.1	0.4	1.0	539	4,446	10.8	89.2	3,907
Falköping	3.0	2,881	39.7	42.4	14.9	1.2	1.5	0.2	1,188	1,693	41.2	58.8	505
Frökind	1.2	1,100	5.8	47.8	7.8	38.4	0.0	0.2	64	1,036	5.8	94.2	972
Gudhem	4.5	4,315	27.1	34.8	14.3	21.6	1.4	0.8	1,228	3,087	28.5	71.5	1,859
Hjo	1.3	1,226	24.8	42.3	26.9	0.3	2.8	2.9	338	888	27.6	72.4	550
Kinne	4.7	4,431	28.4	21.4	30.4	12.7	6.2	0.9	1,531	2,898	34.6	65.4	1,367
Kinnefjärding	2.8	2,646	20.9	32.5	18.6	26.3	1.1	0.5	584	2,062	22.1	77.9	1,478
Kåkind	5.6	5,323	20.2	31.5	19.8	25.4	2.5	0.7	1,205	4,118	22.6	77.4	2,913
Kålland	4.6	4,332	14.5	43.4	29.5	11.3	1.1	0.3	674	3,658	15.6	84.4	2,984
Laske	2.3	2,142	9.6	55.3	17.7	16.4	0.7	0.2	222	1,920	10.4	89.6	1,698
Lidköping	3.9	3,726	46.2	33.0	12.6	0.1	7.5	0.6	2,001	1,725	53.7	46.3	276
Mariestad	3.0	2,830	39.7	36.5	17.3	0.2	5.3	1.0	1,272	1,558	44.9	55.1	286
Skara	2.9	2,746	31.4	40.1	22.1	1.1	3.9	1.4	968	1,778	35.3	64.7	810
Skåning	4.5	4,235	13.2	42.0	23.4	20.5	0.4	0.5	574	3,660	13.6	86.4	3,086
Skövde	4.4	4,206	33.7	45.7	11.6	2.4	4.6	2.0	1,610	2,596	38.3	61.7	986
Tidaholm	2.2	2,126	57.2	19.7	10.9	0.1	11.1	1.1	1,451	675	68.3	31.7	776
Vadsbo Norra	10.4	9,899	27.4	35.3	14.2	18.7	1.2	1.5	2,834	6,900	28.6	69.7	4,066
Vadsbo Södra	11.1	10,562	30.5	29.1	13.8	25.1	0.8	0.5	3,307	7,250	31.3	68.6	3,943
Valle	2.1	1,963	31.3	39.4	14.8	12.3	1.0	1.2	634	1,329	32.3	67.7	695
Vartofta	10.8	10,246	25.6	31.0	10.1	31.0	1.6	0.8	2,781	7,465	27.1	72.9	4,684
Vilske	2.7	2,536	12.1	51.7	10.3	24.9	0.2	0.7	313	2,223	12.3	87.7	1,910
Viste	4.3	4,079	10.7	58.5	17.5	10.8	1.8	0.7	509	3,570	12.5	87.5	3,061
Åse	2.4	2,233	24.3	41.1	14.4	18.8	0.6	0.7	557	1,675	24.9	75.0	1,118
Postal vote	0.1	80							17	63			46
Total	4.0	94,849	25.6	37.6	16.5	17.0	2.2	0.9	26,401	68,273	27.8	72.0	41,872
Source: SCB

=== Stockholm County ===
==== Stockholm ====
Location	Share	Votes	S	AV	F	K	LP	L-vote	R-vote	Left	Right	Margin
Location	%		%	%	%	%	%	%	%	%	%	
Stockholm	100.0	223,012	37.6	39.0	4.6	12.2	6.5	111,027	111,780	49.8	50.1	753
Total	9.5	223,012	37.6	39.0	4.6	12.2	6.5	111,027	111,780	49.8	50.1	753
Source: SCB

==== Stockholm County ====
The Farmers' League and the Liberal Party ran on a joint list, with their respective totals only being reported in the final constituency tallies.

Location	Share	Votes	S	AV	F	B	K	L-vote	R-vote	Left	Right	Margin
Location	%		%	%	%	%	%	%	%	%	%	
Bro-Vätö	1.5	1,513	23.1	43.7	10.2	17.2	5.8	437	1,076	28.9	71.1	639
Danderyd	11.8	11,989	43.9	30.2	7.0	4.2	14.7	7,019	4,966	58.5	41.4	2,053
Djursholm	2.6	2,659	26.1	62.7	5.5	3.9	1.7	741	1,917	27.9	72.1	1,176
Frösåker	4.6	4,673	30.3	25.1	11.0	24.5	9.2	1,842	2,831	39.4	60.6	989
Frötuna-Länna	2.7	2,719	14.3	50.1	14.6	20.7	0.3	396	2,323	14.6	85.4	1,927
Färentuna	2.5	2,572	40.1	16.0	6.6	32.2	5.1	1,162	1,409	45.2	54.8	247
Lidingö	4.1	4,157	32.3	46.5	7.1	3.1	11.0	1,800	2,355	43.3	56.7	555
Lyhundra	1.8	1,875	11.6	52.3	11.9	21.8	2.4	262	1,613	14.0	86.0	1,351
Långhundra	1.6	1,621	18.4	21.7	14.6	42.9	2.5	338	1,283	20.9	79.1	945
Norrtälje	2.4	2,418	34.1	46.2	14.0	1.2	4.5	933	1,485	38.6	61.4	552
Närdinghundra	3.3	3,396	30.7	21.7	15.5	26.4	5.7	1,235	2,161	36.4	63.6	926
Seminghundra	1.4	1,460	18.9	21.7	10.5	47.4	1.5	298	1,162	20.4	79.6	864
Sigtuna	0.4	373	26.0	59.5	7.0	1.6	5.9	119	254	31.9	68.1	135
Sjuhundra	2.1	2,161	36.0	35.5	15.4	9.0	4.1	867	1,294	40.1	59.9	427
Sollentuna	9.4	9,510	54.6	21.0	8.2	3.3	12.9	6,412	3,095	67.4	32.5	3,317
Sotholm	6.5	6,545	40.3	18.7	10.8	21.7	8.4	3,191	3,353	48.8	51.2	162
Sundbyberg	2.8	2,813	60.9	15.0	7.1	1.5	15.6	2,151	662	76.5	23.5	1,489
Svartlösa	12.0	12,134	48.4	29.3	5.9	4.2	12.2	7,350	4,778	60.6	39.4	2,572
Södertälje	6.5	6,583	46.0	33.3	6.5	1.3	12.9	3,878	2,704	58.9	41.1	1,174
Vallentuna	2.5	2,518	37.7	22.9	7.7	20.8	10.8	1,222	1,294	48.5	51.4	72
Vaxholm	1.2	1,191	21.4	29.6	4.8	36.5	7.6	346	845	29.1	70.9	499
Väddö-Häverö	3.8	3,856	28.8	27.9	8.3	19.7	15.4	1,702	2,154	44.1	55.9	452
Värmdö	3.4	3,457	44.5	25.4	9.3	12.8	8.0	1,816	1,641	52.5	47.5	175
Åker	2.1	2,136	28.9	21.7	11.1	37.1	1.3	644	1,492	30.1	69.9	848
Ärlinghundra	2.3	2,301	33.7	20.3	13.0	28.2	4.8	886	1,415	38.5	61.5	529
Öknebo	3.8	3,817	50.7	24.2	7.4	10.7	7.0	2,203	1,613	57.7	42.3	590
Öregrund	0.4	447	17.2	47.7	22.8	6.9	5.4	101	346	22.6	77.4	245
Östhammar	0.4	438	21.0	42.5	28.5	4.1	3.9	109	329	24.9	75.1	220
Postal vote	0.1	75						17	58			41
Total	4.3	101,407	39.3	29.5	9.0	12.7	9.5	49,477	51,908	48.8	51.2	2,431
Source:SCB

=== Södermanland ===
Location	Share	Votes	S	AV	F	B	K	L-vote	R-vote	Left	Right	Margin
Location	%		%	%	%	%	%	%	%	%	%	
Daga	4.6	3,411	33.9	20.8	23.1	20.1	1.1	1,193	2,185	35.0	64.1	992
Eskilstuna	18.8	13,963	67.4	17.3	8.5	1.3	4.1	9,977	3,787	71.5	27.1	6,190
Hölebo	2.8	2,110	44.0	12.3	14.5	26.9	1.4	957	1,134	45.4	53.7	177
Jönåker	9.4	6,966	48.7	15.9	15.5	12.7	5.2	3,756	3,073	53.9	44.1	683
Katrineholm	4.5	3,375	59.2	20.8	16.7	0.4	1.3	2,043	1,278	60.5	37.9	765
Mariefred	0.9	656	35.7	31.3	28.7	2.6	0.6	238	410	36.3	62.5	172
Nyköping	6.2	4,582	49.1	29.9	13.6	0.8	4.4	2,449	2,029	53.4	44.3	420
Oppunda	17.3	12,894	47.8	11.8	25.9	12.3	1.1	6,305	6,449	48.9	50.0	144
Rönö	5.4	4,025	32.7	12.0	18.9	33.5	1.4	1,372	2,595	34.1	64.5	1,223
Selebo	3.0	2,196	38.3	23.8	10.5	23.7	3.6	920	1,273	41.9	58.0	353
Strängnäs	2.9	2,119	31.6	56.4	10.7	0.5	0.0	669	1,433	31.6	67.6	764
Torshälla	1.2	862	60.3	20.1	9.3	6.6	2.2	539	310	62.5	36.0	229
Trosa	0.5	385	31.7	53.2	13.8	0.0	1.0	126	258	32.7	67.0	132
Villåttinge	8.0	5,928	44.3	16.5	17.5	14.4	4.8	2,910	2,871	49.1	48.4	39
Västerrekarne	4.6	3,417	41.8	12.6	24.8	17.9	1.6	1,484	1,892	43.4	55.4	408
Åker	4.2	3,109	48.2	20.4	15.3	13.5	1.7	1,554	1,532	50.0	49.3	22
Österrekarne	5.8	4,314	39.8	19.4	21.9	15.9	2.1	1,805	2,467	41.8	57.2	662
Postal vote	0.0	23						10	13			3
Total	3.2	74,335	48.8	18.5	17.2	11.4	2.7	38,307	34,989	51.5	47.1	3,318
Source: SCB

=== Uppsala ===
Location	Share	Votes	S	AV	F	B	K	LP	L-vote	R-vote	Left	Right	Margin
Location	%		%	%	%	%	%	%	%	%	%	%	
Bro	2.1	1,174	54.7	29.5	4.0	5.5	2.4	4.0	670	504	57.1	42.9	166
Bälinge	2.6	1,408	12.1	13.2	15.4	51.8	1.8	5.7	196	1,212	13.9	86.1	1,016
Enköping	4.7	2,587	42.2	38.5	10.1	1.6	4.4	3.1	1,207	1,380	46.7	53.3	173
Hagunda	3.2	1,742	22.4	27.8	12.6	28.7	2.5	5.9	435	1,307	25.0	75.0	872
Håbo	2.8	1,557	42.8	32.0	7.5	12.3	1.0	4.3	683	874	43.9	56.1	191
Lagunda	2.8	1,544	22.9	27.2	12.4	28.9	2.5	6.0	393	1,151	25.5	74.5	758
Norunda	3.9	2,156	24.6	12.4	27.6	25.4	5.7	4.3	653	1,503	30.3	69.7	850
Oland	14.8	8,143	30.9	10.8	24.3	19.2	10.7	4.2	3,389	4,754	41.6	58.4	1,365
Rasbo	2.5	1,368	23.0	26.5	22.1	19.2	2.0	7.1	342	1,026	25.0	75.0	684
Trögd	6.0	3,302	32.1	21.9	5.8	36.9	0.8	2.5	1,087	2,215	32.9	67.1	1,128
Ulleråker	4.3	2,383	42.1	18.8	10.9	11.7	5.7	10.6	1,140	1,243	47.8	52.2	103
Uppsala	23.9	13,151	37.6	38.9	7.6	0.3	5.3	10.3	5,645	7,506	42.9	57.1	1,861
Vaksala	3.2	1,747	39.6	21.5	8.4	16.9	6.9	6.8	812	935	46.5	53.5	123
Åsunda	3.4	1,860	21.6	23.8	7.5	44.1	1.8	1.2	434	1,426	23.3	76.7	992
Örbyhus	19.7	10,829	55.6	9.3	13.4	13.3	5.6	2.7	6,637	4,192	61.3	38.7	2,445
Postal vote	0.1	31							5	26			21
Total	2.3	54,982	37.8	22.9	12.9	15.4	5.3	5.7	23,728	31,254	43.2	56.8	7,526
Source: SCB

=== Värmland ===
Location	Share	Votes	S	AV	F	B	K	LP	L-vote	R-vote	Left	Right	Margin
Location	%		%	%	%	%	%	%	%	%	%	%	
Arvika	3.0	3,290	35.4	26.2	19.5	0.3	17.5	1.1	1,741	1,549	52.9	47.1	192
Filipstad	2.0	2,240	38.7	37.0	15.5	0.0	8.4	0.4	1,055	1,185	47.1	52.9	130
Fryksdal Norra	6.6	7,253	29.3	22.1	23.8	22.7	1.5	0.7	2,230	5,023	30.7	69.3	2,793
Fryksdal Södra	4.8	5,205	34.0	28.5	12.8	6.9	17.1	0.7	2,660	2,545	51.1	48.9	115
Färnebo	7.1	7,801	58.7	11.3	11.0	1.1	17.7	0.2	5,956	1,845	76.3	23.7	4,111
Gillberg	4.8	5,307	35.8	24.7	21.8	10.3	6.4	1.1	2,239	3,068	42.2	57.8	829
Grums	3.9	4,251	55.6	13.1	12.6	11.1	6.3	1.3	2,630	1,621	61.9	38.1	1,009
Jösse	10.1	11,065	36.5	23.5	21.2	7.5	10.3	1.0	5,177	5,888	46.8	53.2	711
Karlstad	7.2	7,927	39.9	38.5	10.1	0.5	7.7	3.3	3,775	4,152	47.6	52.4	377
Karlstad Hundred	5.5	5,989	49.4	17.1	12.7	3.7	16.3	0.7	3,936	2,053	65.7	34.3	1,883
Kil	7.6	8,340	48.7	11.4	19.2	10.1	9.7	0.9	4,873	3,466	58.4	41.6	1,407
Kristinehamn	4.7	5,169	50.5	27.0	18.5	0.0	3.6	0.4	2,795	2,374	54.1	45.9	421
Nordmark	6.4	7,010	27.2	25.8	28.3	9.2	2.7	6.8	2,096	4,913	29.9	70.1	2,817
Nyed	2.4	2,602	39.0	26.3	22.8	5.3	5.9	0.7	1,170	1,432	45.0	55.0	262
Näs	5.1	5,560	31.3	26.4	7.1	18.3	7.5	0.4	2,160	3,400	38.8	61.2	1,240
Visnum	2.8	3,032	32.7	28.9	25.0	4.1	8.9	0.4	1,263	1,769	41.7	58.3	506
Väse	2.7	2,996	24.3	28.1	34.8	10.6	1.5	0.6	774	2,220	25.8	74.1	1,446
Älvdal Norra	7.7	8,461	49.3	11.5	10.4	1.3	27.4	0.1	6,488	1,973	76.7	23.3	4,515
Älvdal Östra	3.9	4,291	41.6	19.4	14.3	2.9	21.4	0.4	2,704	1,587	63.0	37.0	1,117
Ölme	1.5	1,588	33.8	25.9	31.0	4.1	1.9	0.1	566	1,022	35.6	64.4	456
Postal vote	0.1	59							33	24			9
Total	4.6	109,436	40.7	22.4	17.9	7.0	10.8	1.2	56,321	53,109	51.5	48.5	3,212
Source: SCB

=== Västerbotten ===
Location	Share	Votes	S	AV	F	K	L-vote	R-vote	Left	Right	Margin
Location	%		%	%	%	%	%	%	%	%	
Burträsk	5.0	3,436	8.8	49.2	41.9	0.1	308	3,128	9.0	91.0	2,820
Degerfors	4.8	3,347	13.6	24.4	61.5	0.4	470	2,877	14.0	86.0	2,407
Lycksele	10.4	7,218	16.4	26.3	57.0	0.3	1,212	6,006	16.8	83.2	4,794
Nordmaling-Bjurholm	10.7	7,372	27.7	35.8	36.3	0.2	2,058	5,314	27.9	72.1	3,256
Norsjö-Malå	4.7	3,242	16.2	33.5	50.0	0.3	535	2,707	16.5	83.5	2,172
Nysätra	8.8	6,083	16.5	37.3	45.9	0.2	1,017	5,066	16.7	83.3	4,049
Skellefteå	2.2	1,545	23.6	56.1	19.7	0.6	374	1,171	24.2	75.8	797
Skellefteå ting	22.2	15,379	29.2	45.8	23.7	1.4	4,695	10,681	30.5	69.5	5,986
Umeå	5.6	3,905	32.6	42.5	24.0	0.9	1,308	2,597	33.5	66.5	1,289
Umeå ting	16.1	11,153	23.0	29.8	44.4	2.9	2,886	8,267	25.9	74.1	5,381
Vilhelmina	5.9	4,095	35.4	14.6	49.5	0.4	1,468	2,626	35.8	64.1	1,158
Åsele	3.4	2,375	21.1	24.3	54.4	0.3	506	1,869	21.3	78.7	1,363
Postal vote	0.1	39					15	24			9
Total	2.9	69,189	23.4	35.4	40.2	1.0	16,852	52,333	24.4	75.6	35,481
Source: SCB

=== Västernorrland ===
The two liberal parties Free-minded National Association and the Liberal Party ran on a joint list, although their individual results were counted separately in the nationwide totals.

Location	Share	Votes	S	AV	F	B	K	L-vote	R-vote	Left	Right	Margin
Location	%		%	%	%	%	%	%	%	%	%	
Boteå	5.7	5,524	49.8	15.6	5.3	17.2	12.2	3,424	2,100	62.0	38.0	1,324
Fjällsjö	4.3	4,152	47.2	22.0	2.9	18.6	9.3	2,343	1,809	56.4	43.6	534
Härnösand	4.3	4,187	27.7	49.0	11.6	0.0	11.7	1,650	2,537	39.4	60.6	887
Indal	2.3	2,258	45.7	9.8	19.9	22.3	2.3	1,084	1,174	48.0	52.0	90
Medelpad Västra	13.1	12,774	42.1	7.6	13.2	7.6	10.8	6,749	6,025	52.8	47.2	724
Njurunda	18.4	17,946	58.4	7.3	8.7	7.7	17.9	13,694	4,252	76.3	23.7	9,442
Nordingrå	2.9	2,855	18.0	21.8	23.7	35.3	1.2	547	2,308	19.2	80.8	1,761
Nätra	6.7	6,489	34.1	16.3	23.5	25.2	0.9	2,273	4,216	35.0	65.0	1,943
Ramsele-Resele	5.1	4,924	40.9	21.4	6.6	29.1	2.0	2,113	2,811	42.9	57.1	698
Själevad-Arnäs	9.7	9,486	32.0	24.9	25.4	16.4	1.3	3,161	6,325	33.3	66.7	3,164
Sollefteå	1.1	1,055	24.9	61.3	8.6	3.6	1.5	279	776	26.4	73.6	497
Sollefteå ting	4.1	3,963	54.4	17.6	3.9	22.4	1.7	2,220	1,743	56.0	44.0	477
Sundsvall	6.3	6,122	34.6	47.3	13.9	1.1	3.2	2,311	3,811	37.7	62.3	1,500
Ångermanland Södra	14.3	13,946	41.5	12.1	10.0	15.2	21.2	8,750	5,196	62.7	37.3	3,554
Örnsköldsvik	1.7	1,626	21.3	50.2	21.9	0.6	6.0	444	1,182	27.3	72.7	738
Postal vote	0.1	101						33	68			35
Total	4.1	97,408	42.3	18.7	12.7	16.2	10.1	51,075	46,333	52.4	47.6	4,742
Source: SCB

=== Västmanland ===
Location	Share	Votes	S	AV	F	B	K	L-vote	R-vote	Left	Right	Margin
Location	%		%	%	%	%	%	%	%	%	%	
Arboga	3.1	1,921	45.0	34.1	18.1	0.9	2.0	902	1,019	47.0	53.0	117
Gamla Norberg	10.4	6,543	58.9	16.9	9.4	5.3	9.3	4,462	2,073	68.2	31.7	2,389
Köping	4.1	2,594	36.7	31.2	16.1	8.8	7.2	1,139	1,455	43.9	56.1	316
Norrbo	4.0	2,521	49.9	6.6	16.2	25.1	2.1	1,311	1,210	52.0	48.0	101
Sala	5.1	3,177	40.2	32.0	16.6	2.0	9.1	1,568	1,609	49.4	50.6	41
Siende	3.0	1,900	50.1	12.3	15.1	14.9	7.7	1,097	803	57.7	42.3	294
Simtuna	6.0	3,746	22.3	21.5	27.5	23.5	5.2	1,031	2,715	27.5	72.5	1,684
Skinnskatteberg	3.9	2,436	58.9	14.3	10.3	3.6	12.9	1,750	686	71.8	28.2	1,064
Snevringe	12.8	8,017	54.5	9.1	11.3	13.1	11.9	5,327	2,690	66.4	33.6	2,637
Torstuna	3.1	1,948	23.4	26.4	20.7	19.6	10.0	649	1,299	33.3	66.7	650
Tuhundra	1.6	980	45.0	6.4	21.2	24.6	2.8	468	512	47.8	52.2	44
Vagnsbro	2.4	1,484	25.4	4.1	31.0	38.6	0.9	390	1,094	26.3	73.7	704
Våla	5.0	3,122	24.7	12.9	39.2	21.2	1.9	831	2,291	26.6	73.4	1,460
Västerås	19.5	12,246	56.1	24.2	12.0	0.9	6.9	7,708	4,538	62.9	37.1	3,170
Yttertjurbo	1.5	916	27.2	14.5	14.8	40.6	2.8	275	641	30.0	70.0	366
Åkerbo	10.8	6,776	44.9	13.6	14.8	20.9	5.8	3,434	3,342	50.7	49.3	92
Övertjurbo	4.0	2,520	18.7	16.6	20.8	41.7	2.1	523	1,995	20.8	79.2	1,472
Postal vote	0.0	25						6	19			13
Total	2.7	62,872	45.3	18.1	16.2	13.4	7.0	32,871	29,991	52.3	47.7	2,880
Source: SCB

=== Älvsborg ===
==== Älvsborg N ====
Location	Share	Votes	S	AV	F	B	K	LP	L-vote	R-vote	Left	Right	Margin
Location	%		%	%	%	%	%	%	%	%	%	%	
Ale	8.1	5,522	37.3	22.1	6.6	26.1	3.0	4.9	2,224	3,297	40.3	59.7	1,073
Alingsås	5.0	3,422	43.7	31.5	15.6	0.1	1.8	7.3	1,557	1,865	45.5	54.5	308
Bjärke	2.5	1,687	11.9	34.5	36.5	5.6	0.0	11.6	200	1,487	11.9	88.1	1,287
Flundre	3.9	2,678	59.9	15.0	4.1	14.0	1.8	5.3	1,652	1,026	61.7	38.3	626
Gäsene	6.3	4,278	8.7	45.4	21.1	22.7	0.0	2.1	373	3,905	8.7	91.3	3,532
Kulling	9.2	6,223	17.3	30.3	35.0	10.0	0.5	7.0	1,107	5,116	17.8	82.2	4,009
Nordal	5.4	3,682	26.7	19.1	7.2	34.8	2.3	9.9	1,069	2,612	29.0	70.9	1,543
Sundal	7.0	4,757	7.2	34.3	3.1	51.2	0.0	4.2	343	4,414	7.2	92.8	4,071
Trollhättan	7.6	5,135	65.0	12.5	6.2	0.1	7.6	8.6	3,728	1,407	72.6	27.4	2,321
Tössbo	4.0	2,715	25.5	29.8	13.1	24.9	1.5	5.2	735	1,980	27.1	72.9	1,245
Valbo	6.5	4,428	18.7	44.5	1.7	27.2	1.4	6.5	892	3,536	20.1	79.9	2,644
Vedbo	11.8	8,028	30.8	15.6	15.3	24.0	4.8	9.6	2,856	5,172	35.6	64.4	2,316
Väne	6.8	4,607	54.6	21.7	8.4	9.6	1.2	4.4	2,570	2,037	55.8	44.2	533
Vänersborg	5.2	3,551	47.9	33.2	3.2	0.1	3.5	12.0	1,827	1,724	51.5	48.5	103
Vättle	6.0	4,050	41.9	26.5	15.3	6.9	2.0	7.5	1,775	2,275	43.8	56.2	500
Åmål	4.4	3,013	54.0	28.0	11.4	0.2	3.2	3.1	1,725	1,287	57.3	42.7	438
Postal vote	0.1	41							21	20			1
Total	2.9	67,817	34.0	26.9	12.6	17.3	6.8	2.4	24,654	43,160	36.4	63.6	18,506
Source: SCB

==== Älvsborg S ====
Location	Share	Votes	S	AV	F	B	K	L-vote	R-vote	Left	Right	Margin
Location	%		%	%	%	%	%	%	%	%	%	
Bollebygd	4.5	2,574	19.4	65.5	6.4	6.6	2.0	552	2,022	21.4	78.6	1,470
Borås	23.9	13,557	43.1	40.5	10.3	0.4	5.7	6,612	6,945	48.7	51.2	333
Kind	21.8	12,341	16.8	46.3	11.9	24.5	0.5	2,138	10,202	17.3	82.7	8,064
Mark	25.3	14,355	29.0	51.1	4.8	11.7	3.3	4,641	9,711	32.3	67.6	5,070
Redväg	7.9	4,494	6.3	34.4	21.3	37.8	0.2	294	4,200	6.5	93.5	3,906
Ulricehamn	3.0	1,706	28.0	43.5	24.0	0.7	3.8	542	1,164	31.8	68.2	622
Veden	4.8	2,747	10.7	57.8	11.4	19.4	0.7	312	2,435	11.4	88.6	2,123
Ås	8.6	4,899	15.2	48.2	9.7	26.6	0.3	758	4,141	15.5	84.5	3,383
Postal vote	0.0	9						3	6			3
Total	2.4	56,682	25.4	46.7	10.4	14.9	2.6	15,852	40,826	28.0	72.0	24,974
Source: SCB

=== Örebro ===
Location	Share	Votes	S	AV	F	B	K	LP	L-vote	R-vote	Left	Right	Margin
Location	%		%	%	%	%	%	%	%	%	%	%	
Asker	4.3	3,550	25.3	13.7	43.5	13.7	2.4	1.3	983	2,562	27.7	72.2	1,579
Askersund	1.0	841	22.7	44.8	25.6	2.7	1.7	2.5	205	636	24.4	75.6	431
Edsberg	5.8	4,870	35.0	15.3	32.6	10.0	5.9	1.1	1,988	2,873	40.8	59.0	885
Fellingsbro	4.6	3,789	31.6	24.3	25.1	12.8	4.4	1.5	1,366	2,416	36.1	63.8	1,050
Glanshammar	2.8	2,338	23.1	18.5	38.5	13.7	0.9	5.2	559	1,773	23.9	75.8	1,214
Grimsten	3.7	3,044	43.9	7.2	26.1	9.5	12.5	0.7	1,717	1,323	56.4	43.5	394
Grythytte-Hällefors	4.1	3,415	64.0	6.2	7.8	2.6	17.7	1.6	2,791	621	81.7	18.2	2,170
Hardemo	1.0	806	18.6	20.6	34.6	23.3	1.6	1.0	163	641	20.2	79.5	478
Karlskoga	9.8	8,137	55.6	14.0	10.3	9.5	9.6	0.8	5,303	2,820	65.2	34.7	2,483
Kumla	9.7	8,118	38.2	21.6	28.4	11.9	1.9	1.8	3,463	4,639	42.7	57.1	1,176
Linde-Ramsberg	5.2	4,347	39.8	17.2	14.1	25.0	1.9	1.8	1,813	2,522	41.7	58.0	709
Lindesberg	1.6	1,371	29.5	41.9	23.2	1.6	2.0	1.6	432	937	31.5	68.3	505
Nora	1.5	1,231	33.5	36.4	22.1	0.3	4.6	2.8	469	758	38.1	61.6	289
Nora-Hjulsjö	4.4	3,648	49.0	13.9	18.7	8.8	7.8	1.6	2,073	1,568	56.8	43.0	505
Nya Kopparberg	4.4	3,651	58.5	15.9	11.5	6.5	5.7	1.4	2,345	1,290	64.2	35.3	1,055
Sköllersta	4.3	3,596	27.4	15.5	42.2	11.9	1.9	0.9	1,052	2,535	29.3	70.5	1,483
Sundbo	4.2	3,532	51.1	12.8	11.7	19.6	2.5	2.1	1,895	1,632	53.7	46.2	263
Örebro	17.5	14,555	44.5	25.4	16.1	0.1	4.9	5.8	7,187	6,891	49.4	47.3	296
Örebro Hundred	10.1	8,409	47.3	16.8	21.4	5.1	5.4	2.7	4,433	3,861	52.7	45.9	572
Postal vote	0.0	26							13	13			0
Total	3.5	83,274	42.7	18.5	21.7	8.2	5.6	2.4	40,250	42,311	48.3	50.8	2,061
Source: SCB

=== Östergötland ===
Location	Share	Votes	S	AV	F	B	K	LP	L-vote	R-vote	Left	Right	Margin
Location	%		%	%	%	%	%	%	%	%	%	%	
Aska	4.8	5,790	46.4	21.0	11.9	9.6	9.2	1.9	3,218	2,572	55.6	44.4	646
Bankekind	3.8	4,580	46.6	20.4	7.1	16.2	3.5	6.0	2,298	2,282	50.2	49.8	16
Björkekind	1.3	1,527	22.1	32.8	4.5	36.1	2.2	2.2	371	1,156	24.3	75.7	785
Boberg	2.6	3,200	31.8	28.1	11.0	20.4	6.4	2.2	1,225	1,975	38.3	61.7	750
Bråbo	1.9	2,317	59.0	22.1	5.7	4.1	9.0	0.1	1,576	741	68.0	32.0	835
Dal	1.3	1,561	28.3	21.9	6.4	32.6	9.5	1.3	590	971	37.8	62.2	381
Finspånga län	8.8	10,646	48.1	16.4	13.2	17.0	4.5	0.8	5,600	5,046	52.6	47.4	554
Gullberg	2.0	2,450	32.1	23.6	7.4	23.7	8.0	7.4	983	1,467	40.1	59.9	484
Göstring	5.0	6,063	30.4	26.7	9.4	19.2	12.1	2.2	2,575	3,487	42.5	57.5	912
Hammarkind	4.8	5,862	31.5	40.9	7.6	12.2	3.8	4.1	2,068	3,794	35.3	64.7	1,726
Hanekind	2.2	2,684	34.2	32.0	7.0	20.0	2.4	4.4	984	1,700	36.7	63.3	716
Kind	5.5	6,631	28.7	40.2	10.4	16.7	1.3	2.7	1,994	4,637	30.1	69.9	2,643
Linköping	9.3	11,288	37.3	45.7	8.0	0.7	2.4	5.9	4,477	6,811	39.7	60.3	2,334
Lysing	3.1	3,724	21.9	36.2	15.3	22.7	2.1	1.7	897	2,827	24.1	75.9	1,930
Lösing	1.7	2,018	52.0	22.7	6.4	16.7	1.5	0.7	1,079	939	53.5	46.5	140
Memming	3.1	3,751	51.3	28.4	8.5	2.0	8.1	1.7	2,228	1,523	59.4	40.6	705
Mjölby	2.3	2,815	50.0	29.0	11.4	1.5	5.5	2.6	1,563	1,252	55.5	44.5	311
Motala	1.9	2,307	29.5	43.1	19.9	0.1	6.0	1.4	819	1,488	35.5	64.5	669
Norrköping	21.2	25,705	48.6	36.0	5.0	0.6	8.8	1.0	14,754	10,951	57.4	42.6	3,803
Skänninge	0.5	585	26.8	44.8	17.1	2.2	5.8	3.2	191	394	32.6	67.4	203
Skärkind	1.6	1,936	34.0	30.9	7.1	22.6	2.3	7.1	703	1,233	36.3	63.7	530
Söderköping	0.9	1,102	32.2	48.6	9.8	1.3	1.5	6.5	372	730	33.8	66.2	358
Vadstena	1.0	1,269	29.9	43.5	14.8	2.6	5.3	3.6	447	819	35.2	64.5	372
Valkebo	2.1	2,500	31.4	32.4	9.4	22.4	0.4	4.0	797	1,703	31.9	68.1	906
Vifolka	2.4	2,867	31.9	38.2	12.0	11.0	4.4	2.6	1,040	1,827	36.3	63.7	787
Ydre	2.3	2,835	23.8	24.8	27.8	21.7	0.7	1.2	695	2,140	24.5	75.5	1,445
Åkerbo	1.0	1,274	18.1	54.5	6.6	16.9	0.3	3.7	234	1,040	18.4	81.6	806
Östkind	1.8	2,161	21.8	38.2	8.7	28.6	0.8	1.9	489	1,672	22.6	77.4	1,183
Postal vote	0.1	70							18	52			34
Total	5.2	121,518	39.2	32.5	9.3	11.0	5.5	2.5	54,285	67,229	44.7	55.3	12,944
Source: SCB
