= Charlotte Agell =

Swedish-born American author

- Born: Charlotte Agell; September 7, 1959 (age 67); Norsjö, Sweden
- Education: Bowdoin College (BA); Harvard University (MEd); University of Southern Maine
- Occupations: Novelist and teacher
- Spouse: Peter J. Simmons (m. 1981)
- Children: Anna Simmons; Jon Simmons
- Writing career
- Notable works: Shift; Maybe Tomorrow; Welcome Home Or Someplace Like It
- Website: www.charlotteagell.com

Charlotte Agell (born September 7, 1959) is a Swedish-born American author for young adults and children who lives in Maine. Her second novel, Shift, was featured on the front cover of the Brunswick Times Record in October 2008. In addition to writing novels, Agell writes and illustrates picture books for young children. She won a Maine Literary Award in 2020 and was listed on the Rainbow Book List in 2011. Agell is a teacher in Maine and active in Arrt! (Artists' Rapid Response Team) which collaborates with non-profit groups to promote social change in Maine.

== Early life and education ==
Agell was born in Norsjö, Sweden, on September 7, 1959 and became a naturalized citizen of the United States in the 1990s. She is the daughter of businessman Christer L. Agell and artist Margareta "Meta" McDonald. Her great-grandfather, Hugo K. Segerborg, was the director of the Royal Swedish Academy of Arts. When asked about her childhood, Agell said, "somebody always handed me art supplies." Her family moved to Montreal, Quebec, Canada when she was two years old. Agell's brother Karl Agell and sister Anna Agell were born in Montreal. She attended Carlyle Elementary school where she learned English and listened to tales of Maine from Anglo-Canadian and Franco-Canadian friends. She became enamored with Maine hence wrote a story set in Halibut, Maine; a fictional town in which she imagined herself as her protagonist, a ruddy-cheeked boy catching fish for dinner.

At the age of eleven, Agell's family moved from Canada back to Sweden (where they stayed briefly) and then to Hong Kong . She graduated from a Lutheran mission school; Hong Kong International School; which she said was affiliated with an open-minded ecumenical church.

As a compromise with her mother, Agell applied to Bowdoin College in Brunswick, for early acceptance. Instead of leaving school for a hitch-hiking stint with her boyfriend, she left Hong Kong and arrived in Maine in 1977. She felt an immediate sense of home and has lived in the state ever since. Recalling her childhood story, she wonders if she'd "written herself into the state."

Agell graduated from Bowdoin College in 1981, where she studied art and earned a Bachelor of Arts degree in education. She later earned a teaching certificate from the University of Southern Maine, and a master's degree in education from the Harvard Graduate School of Education in 1986.

== Literary works ==
=== Dancing Feet (1994) ===
Dancing Feet is a rhyming story about the function of feet, hands, noses, legs and mouths. The text is matched with watercolor illustrations that depict similarities and differences of people from a wide variety of ethnic backgrounds and reflecting Agell's interest in multicultural education. One reviewer found the drawings range from the "suggestively simple to excessively cartoonish." However, other reviewers found the book enjoyable to read and a good choice for story hour. Dancing Feet was listed on the New York Times "Bookshelf." Recommended for ages 3–7.

=== To the Island (1999) and Up the Mountain (2000) ===
To the Island and Up the Mountain feature four friends: Dragon, Cat, Chicken and Rabbit. They spend time together exploring their surroundings. In To the Island, recommended for ages 3–5, the four friends venture to a nearby island for a picnic. The story is described by Donna Gold of the Portland Press Herald as "neither silly nor solemn," with a text suitable for beginning readers and illustrations that, through use of vibrant colors, depict a happy time spent with friends.

In Up the Mountain, the four set off on a rainy day to climb a mountain. The adventure is, reportedly, "too mild for children at the upper end of the target audience" (the four just basically walk to the top of the mountain and back), but reviewers agree the simple rhymes and the illustrations, conveyed in ink, watercolor and pastels, are suitable for young listeners. Recommended ages 2–5.

=== Welcome Home or Someplace Like It (2003) ===
Welcome Home or Someplace Like It, Agell's debut novel, is a semi-autobiographical story told through the experiences of 13-year-old Aggie Wing. Aggie and her brother, Thorne, are faced with learning to cope with life in Ludwig, Maine after being dropped off there by their mother, a romance writer, who leaves to do research in Niagara Falls. The two children have moved a lot and must now learn to live with their 91-year-old grandfather. Themes in the book include abandonment, bravery, community, family, and discoveries of home. Elsa Geskus, in Childhood Education, describes the book as a coming of age story and Barbara Auerbach reports in the School Library Journal, the book has "strong and winning characters; excellent pacing; and a lazy, nostalgic setting." Welcome Home or Someplace Like It has been compared with Polly Horvath's The Canning Season. The book was listed in "What to Read" by the New York Times. Recommended for ages 12 and up.

=== Shift (2008) ===
Shift, a dystopian book, takes on an admittedly darker tone than Agell's previous books. It was written in the aftermath of the attacks on the World Trade Center and Pentagon that occurred in the United States on September 11, 2001. Agell felt a sense of outrage about the U.S. government's response to those events. "Was this really my country bombing its way to peace? Wiretapping its citizens to protect their freedoms?" she wrote in an interview for Macmillan Publishers, "As someone who chose American citizenship on purpose, as an adult, I felt such a sense of betrayal. My country had been hijacked by a fear-mongering regime: ours. The whole thing had a surreal quality about it."

Agell channeled her anger into the novel, exploring themes such as personal freedom, government control, separation of church and state, religion, science and evolution, and identity, as experienced by the 15-year-old protagonist, Adrian Havoc who, with his sister Shriek, must somehow make sense out of a world that is "out of whack." The world they travel through in Shift is the partially post-nuclear United Christian States controlled by Homestate agents, with similarities to 1984 (George Orwell), The Stand (Stephen King) and The Road (Cormac McCarthy).

Agell views Shift as a cautionary tale. Reviewers find the book thought-provoking and readable for its intended young adult audience, though some find the plot confusing and take issue with the seemingly anti-Christian themes. Agell disagrees with this sentiment, saying through her character Lenore, "God wants us to think." Agell finds it strange that, in the book and in real life, this idea stirs up controversy. Agell wants her readers to learn to ask "what if" and develop the skills to think for themselves, regardless of their religious affiliations.

In March 2011, Shift was adapted for stage by Al Miller and performed as part of the Theater Project (a Young Company Production), in Brunswick, Maine.

=== The Accidental Adventures of India McAllister (2010) ===
The Accidental Adventures of India McAllister focuses on the daily life of a fourth grade girl, India McAllister, growing up in a small town in Maine. Themes of the book include adoption, friendships, breast cancer, homosexuality, and divorce. They are interwoven throughout the book as ordinary occurrences in the young girl's life. The text is accompanied by India's (Agell's) line drawings. One reviewer criticized the book as too complicated, leaving unresolved most of the issues India encounters in the book. Recommended for children ages 8–11, The Accidental Adventure of India McAllister was named among the top ten GLBTQ books for young readers by the American Library Association's 2011 Rainbow Project.

== Publications ==
=== Young adult novels ===
- Agell, Sharlotte (Sep 30, 2008). Shift. Henry Holt and Company (Books for Young Readers). ISBN 9780805078107.
- Agell, Charlotte (Sep 1, 2003). Welcome Home or Someplace Like It. Henry Holt and Co. (Books for Young Readers). ISBN 978-0805070835.

=== Picture books ===
- Agell, Charlotte (Apr 9, 2019). Mud, Sand, and Snow. Illustrated by Charlotte Agell. Islandport Press. ISBN 978-1944762636.
- Agell, Charlotte (Mar 26, 2019). Maybe Tomorrow?. Illustrated by Ana Ramírez González. Scholastic Press. ISBN 978-1338214888.
- "Maybe Tomorrow? (A story about loss, healing, and friendship) | Longfellow Books". longfellowbooks.com. 2019-03-26. Winner of the 2020 Maine Literary Award
- Agell, Charlotte (Mar 1, 2000). Up the Mountain. Illustrated by Charlotte Agell. DK Publishing. ISBN 978-0-7894-2610-9.
- Agell, Charlotte (Sep 15, 1998). To the Island. Illustrated by Charlotte Agell. D. K. Publishing. ISBN 078942505X.
- Agell, Charlotte (1995). I Swam With a Seal. Illustrated by Charlotte Agell. Gulliver Books. ISBN 9780152001766.
- A Quartet:
  - Agell, Charlotte (Jan 1, 1994). Mud Makes Me Dance in the Spring. Tilbury House Pub. ISBN 978-0884481126.
  - Agell, Charlotte (Jun 1, 1994). I Wear Long Green Hair in Summer. Tilbury House Publishers. ISBN 978-0884481133.
  - Agell, Charlotte (Jan 1, 1994). Wind Spins Me Around in the Fall. Tilbury House Pub. ISBN 978-0884481140.
  - I Slide into the White of Winter
- Dancing Feet
- Agell, Charlotte (Oct 1, 1991). The Sailor's Book. Firefly Books Ltd. ISBN 978-0920668917.

=== Chapter books ===
- Agell, Charlotte (Jun 22, 2010). The Accidental Adventures of India McAllister. Illustrations by Charlotte Agell. Henry Holt and Co (Books for Young Readers). ISBN 9780805089028. Named American Library Association Top Ten Rainbow List book.

== Selected talks and demonstrations ==
- Tell Me a Story: About Maine, Atrium Art Gallery, University of Southern Maine Lewiston-Auburn Campus, Lewiston, ME (2013)
- The Great Bangor Draw-Off, Bangor Book Festival, Bangor Public Library Lecture Hall, Bangor, ME (2011)
- Maine Festival of the Book, University of Southern Maine, Portland, ME
- Maine Writers and Publishers Alliance Holiday Book Sale, Rines Auditorium, Portland Public Library, Portland, ME (2010)
- Children's Celebration of Martin Luther King Jr, Bowdoin College Library, Brunswick, ME (2009) (2010) (2012)
- Fall Writing Retreat (Instructor), Haystack Mountain School of Crafts, Deer Isle, ME (2005) (2006)
- Books & Blooms, Coastal Maine Botanical Gardens, Boothbay, ME (2005)
- Raising Readers Book Festival, a celebration of winter and reading, Pineland Farms, New Gloucester, ME (2005)
- Blueberries and Moose: A Festival of Maine Children's Literature, Portland Public Market, Portland, ME (2004)
- Writer-Illustrator Talk, hosted by Yarmouth Arts, Yarmouth, ME (2004)
- Family Arts Festival, Brunswick, ME (2001)
- Barbara Cooney Festival of Children's Book Illustration, Round Top Center for the Arts, Skidompha Public Library, Damariscotta, ME (1999)
- Full Circle Summer Fair, Union, ME (1997)
- South Freeport Congregational Church Summer Festival, Freeport, ME (1996)

== Educator ==
Agell taught multilingual and multicultural education at Portland High School, Portland, Maine and was a teacher in the gifted and talented language arts program at Harrison Middle School in Yarmouth, Maine until 2022. She says she's found her "tribe" with middle-schoolers. She has conducted workshops for youths and adults at various literary events throughout Maine, including the Haystack Mountain School of Crafts in Deer Isle.

== Personal life ==
Agell lived in several Maine towns before settling in Brunswick with her husband Peter J. Simmons, an arts administrator and master gardener. She and Simmons have two children.
