= Skoby =

- Location within Uppsala Location within Sweden
- Coordinates: 60°02′N 18°01′E
- Country: Sweden
- Province: Uppland
- County: Uppsala County
- Municipality: Östhammar Municipality and Uppsala Municipality

Area
  - Total: 0.45 km^{2} (0.17 sq mi)

Population (31 December 2020)
  - Total: 238
  - Density: 530/km^{2} (1,400/sq mi)
- Time zone: UTC+1 (CET)
  - Summer (DST): UTC+2 (CEST)

Skoby is a bimunicipal locality situated in Östhammar Municipality and Uppsala Municipality in Uppsala County, Sweden with 230 inhabitants in 2010.
