= Östhammar Municipality =

Östhammar Municipality Östhammars kommun
- Municipality
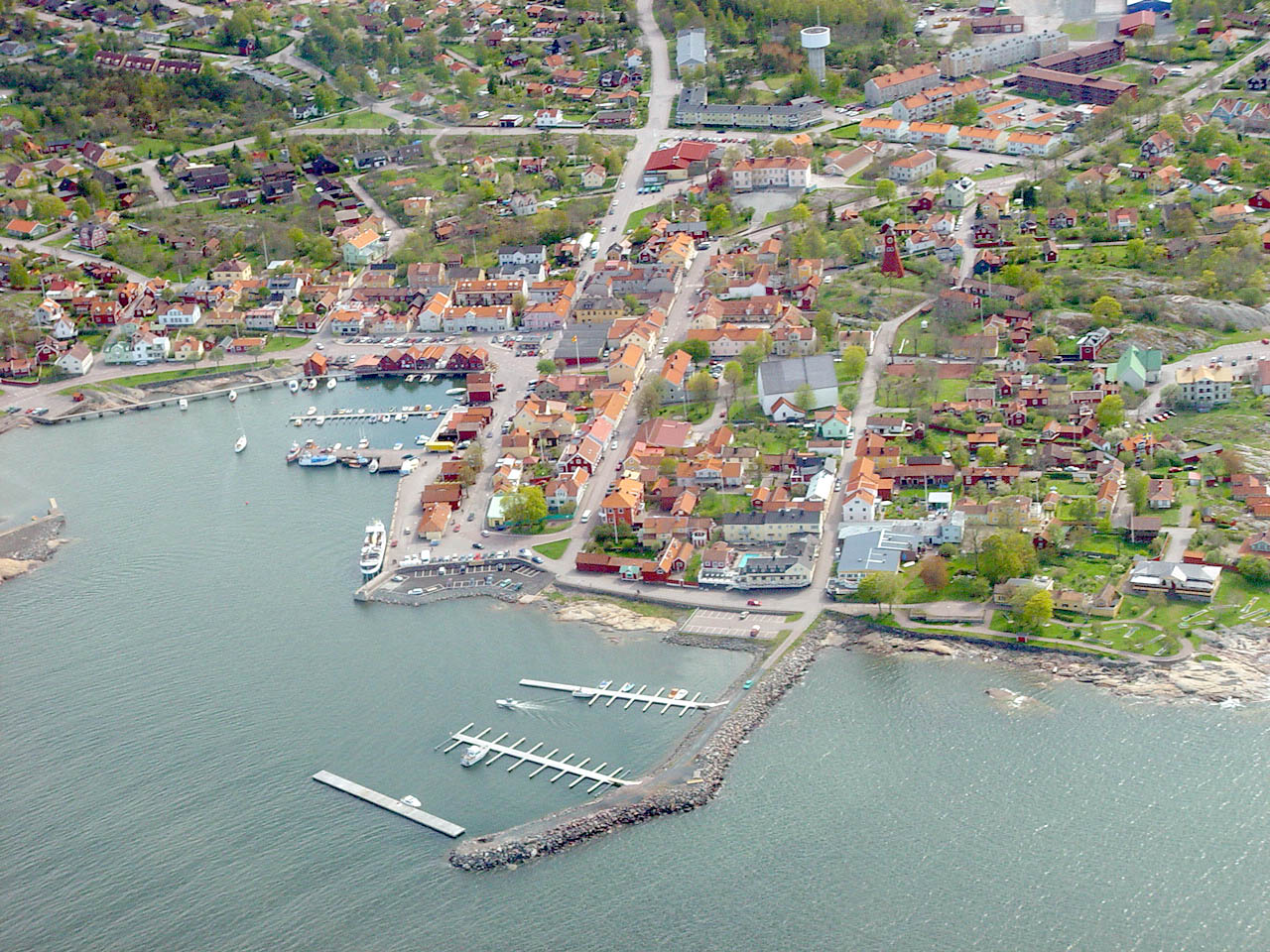

- Coat of arms

- Coordinates: 60°16′N 18°22′E
- Country: Sweden
- County: Uppsala County
- Seat: Östhammar

Government
  - Mayor: Fabian Sjöberg (Moderate Party)

Area
  - Total: 3,486.4 km^{2} (1,346.1 sq mi)
  - Land: 1,475.28 km^{2} (569.61 sq mi)
  - Water: 2,011.12 km^{2} (776.50 sq mi)
- Area as of 1 January 2014.

Population (30 June 2025)
  - Total: 22,179
  - Density: 15.034/km^{2} (38.937/sq mi)
- Time zone: UTC+1 (CET)
  - Summer (DST): UTC+2 (CEST)
- ISO 3166 code: SE
- Province: Uppland
- Municipal code: 0382
- Website: www.osthammar.se

Östhammar Municipality (Swedish: Östhammars kommun) is a municipality in Uppsala County in east central Sweden. Its seat is located in the city of Östhammar.

The present municipality was created during the local government reform in the late sixties and early seventies. Already in 1967 the City of Öregrund joined the City of Östhammar in a common municipality. It was the first time a former city joined another local government unit. By 1971 the new combined city became a municipality of unitary type and in 1974 more units were added.

In June 2018 the municipal council voted in favour of the building of Forsmark nuclear waste repository, with the final decision needing to be made by the Swedish government.

== Localities ==
All towns with over 200 inhabitants in 2000, from Statistics Sweden.

- Östhammar (seat)
- Gimo
- Österbybruk
- Hargshamn
- Dannemora
- Öregrund
- Alunda
- Skoby (part of this bimunicipal locality is in Uppsala Municipality)
- Norrskedika

Another notable village is Forsmark (pop. 59), where the Forsmark Nuclear Power Plant is situated.

== Demographics ==
This is a demographic table based on Östhammar Municipality's electoral districts in the 2022 Swedish general election sourced from SVT's election platform, in turn taken from SCB official statistics.

In total there were 17,497 Swedish citizens of voting age resident in the municipality. 42.1% voted for the left coalition and 56.9% for the right coalition. Indicators are in percentage points except population totals and income.

Location	Residents	Citizen adults	Left vote	Right vote	Employed	Swedish parents	Foreign heritage	Income SEK	Degree
Location			%	%					
Alunda-Ekeby	2,138	1,651	35.8	63.0	88	94	6	26,935	29
Alunda tätort	2,544	1,829	39.0	59.9	88	92	8	26,275	32
Ed	1,588	1,211	42.4	57.0	90	89	11	27,948	30
Gimo-Hökhuvud-Vattensta	1,611	1,240	44.8	54.3	88	86	14	27,335	23
Gimo V	1,812	1,306	45.1	54.0	76	71	29	23,488	22
Hargshamn-Boda	1,387	1,131	45.5	53.4	86	89	11	25,644	29
Kristinelund-Boda	1,534	1,101	46.5	52.5	78	80	20	23,682	32
Norrskedika-Valö-Forsmark	1,332	1,131	40.5	58.6	85	92	8	25,930	23
Öregrund N-Gräsö	1,408	1,261	42.9	56.6	84	94	6	23,926	30
Öregrund S-Söderön	1,785	1,450	39.7	59.9	87	92	8	26,182	30
Österbybruk-Dannemora	2,076	1,584	42.5	56.1	86	85	15	24,980	21
Österbybruk-Morkarla	1,667	1,315	40.0	57.8	85	87	13	25,694	20
Östhammars C	1,470	1,287	47.1	52.3	85	90	10	23,710	29
Source: SVT

== Climate ==
Österbybruk has a humid continental climate that is quite mild throughout the year, especially considering its northerly latitude.

Climate data for Österbybruk, 2002-2015 (precipitation 1961-1990)
Month	Jan	Feb	Mar	Apr	May	Jun	Jul	Aug	Sep	Oct	Nov	Dec	Year
Record high °C (°F)	10.0 (50.0)	11.9 (53.4)	17.7 (63.9)	27.4 (81.3)	28.6 (83.5)	30.6 (87.1)	34.4 (93.9)	32.8 (91.0)	27.6 (81.7)	20.6 (69.1)	14.4 (57.9)	12.6 (54.7)	34.4 (93.9)
Mean daily maximum °C (°F)	−0.5 (31.1)	0.2 (32.4)	4.4 (39.9)	10.9 (51.6)	15.9 (60.6)	19.7 (67.5)	23.0 (73.4)	21.6 (70.9)	16.6 (61.9)	9.4 (48.9)	4.4 (39.9)	1.1 (34.0)	10.5 (50.9)
Daily mean °C (°F)	−3.5 (25.7)	−3.1 (26.4)	−0.1 (31.8)	5.3 (41.5)	10.0 (50.0)	14.4 (57.9)	17.3 (63.1)	16.0 (60.8)	11.5 (52.7)	5.7 (42.3)	1.9 (35.4)	−1.7 (28.9)	6.1 (43.0)
Mean daily minimum °C (°F)	−6.6 (20.1)	−6.5 (20.3)	−4.6 (23.7)	−0.2 (31.6)	4.2 (39.6)	8.1 (46.6)	11.6 (52.9)	10.5 (50.9)	6.4 (43.5)	2.0 (35.6)	−0.6 (30.9)	−4.4 (24.1)	1.6 (34.9)
Record low °C (°F)	−34.0 (−29.2)	−30.4 (−22.7)	−27.3 (−17.1)	−13.8 (7.2)	−5.6 (21.9)	−2.0 (28.4)	1.0 (33.8)	−1.0 (30.2)	−4.7 (23.5)	−15.6 (3.9)	−20.9 (−5.6)	−32.4 (−26.3)	−34.0 (−29.2)
Average precipitation mm (inches)	46.5 (1.83)	32.5 (1.28)	33.2 (1.31)	35.0 (1.38)	31.7 (1.25)	38.8 (1.53)	74.6 (2.94)	73.8 (2.91)	58.9 (2.32)	55.1 (2.17)	62.0 (2.44)	51.6 (2.03)	593.6 (23.37)
Source 1: SMHI
Source 2: SMHI Monthly Data 2002-2015

Climate data for Films Kyrkby, 1961-2018 (precipitation 1961-1990)
Month	Jan	Feb	Mar	Apr	May	Jun	Jul	Aug	Sep	Oct	Nov	Dec	Year
Mean daily maximum °C (°F)	−1.3 (29.7)	−1.2 (29.8)	2.6 (36.7)	9.0 (48.2)	15.4 (59.7)	20.0 (68.0)	21.7 (71.1)	19.9 (67.8)	15.1 (59.2)	9.6 (49.3)	3.3 (37.9)	−0.4 (31.3)	9.8 (49.6)
Daily mean °C (°F)	−4.8 (23.4)	−4.7 (23.5)	−2.0 (28.4)	3.4 (38.1)	9.5 (49.1)	14.2 (57.6)	15.9 (60.6)	14.3 (57.7)	10.1 (50.2)	5.9 (42.6)	0.8 (33.4)	−3.1 (26.4)	5.0 (41.0)
Mean daily minimum °C (°F)	−8.3 (17.1)	−8.4 (16.9)	−6.4 (20.5)	−1.8 (28.8)	4.1 (39.4)	8.4 (47.1)	10.1 (50.2)	9.8 (49.6)	5.0 (41.0)	2.2 (36.0)	−1.7 (28.9)	−5.8 (21.6)	0.2 (32.4)
Source 1: SMHI
Source 2: SMHI Monthly Data 2002-2015
