= Norrskedika =

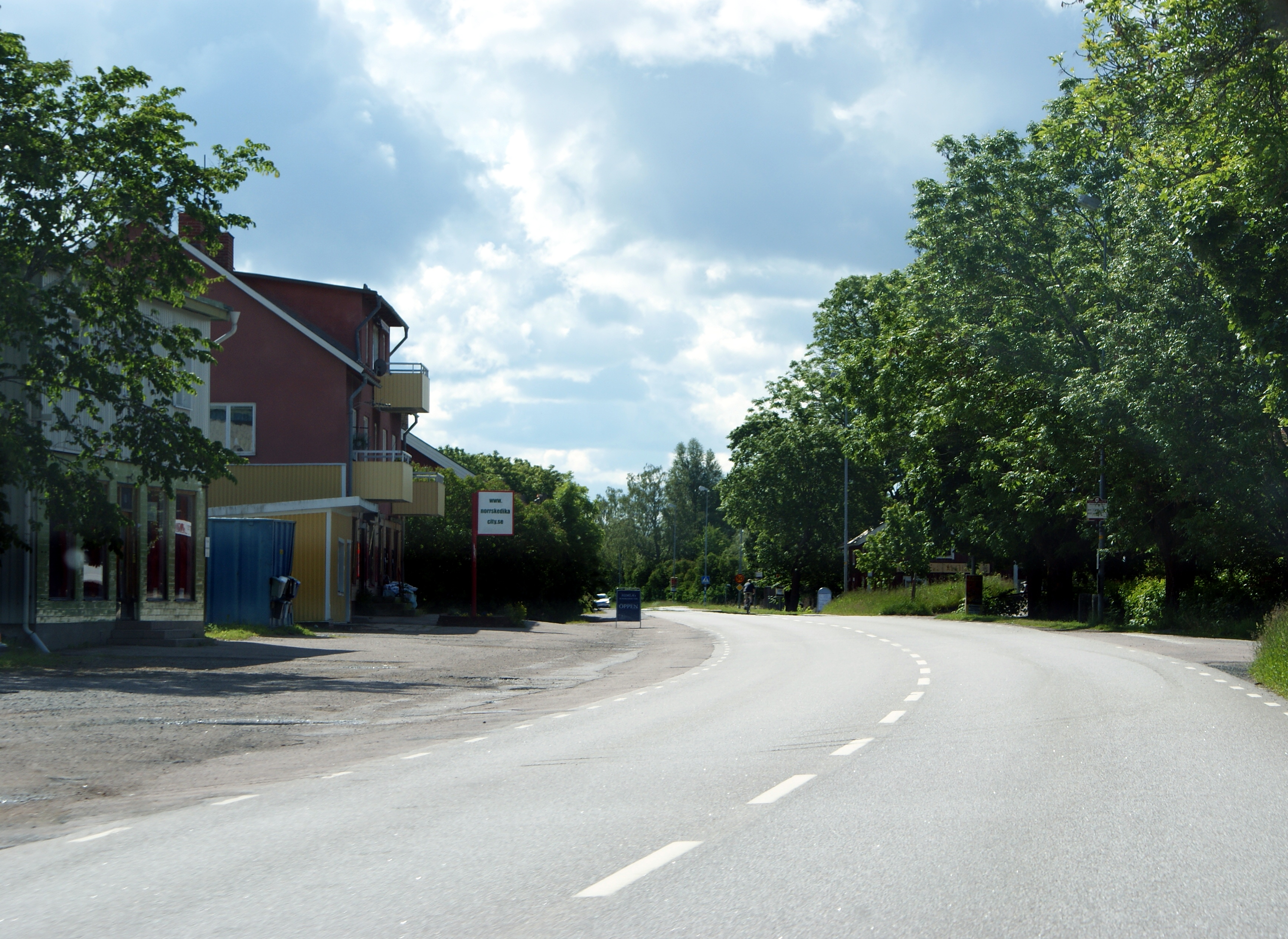
- The road into Norrskedika from north

- Location within Uppsala Location within Sweden
- Coordinates: 60°17′N 18°17′E
- Country: Sweden
- Province: Uppland
- County: Uppsala County
- Municipality: Östhammar Municipality

Area
  - Total: 0.60 km^{2} (0.23 sq mi)

Population (31 December 2010)
  - Total: 214
  - Density: 354/km^{2} (920/sq mi)
- Time zone: UTC+1 (CET)
  - Summer (DST): UTC+2 (CEST)

Norrskedika is a locality situated in Östhammar Municipality, Uppsala County, Sweden. It had 214 inhabitants as at 2010.
