= Norsjö Municipality =

Norsjö Municipality Norsjö kommun
- Municipality
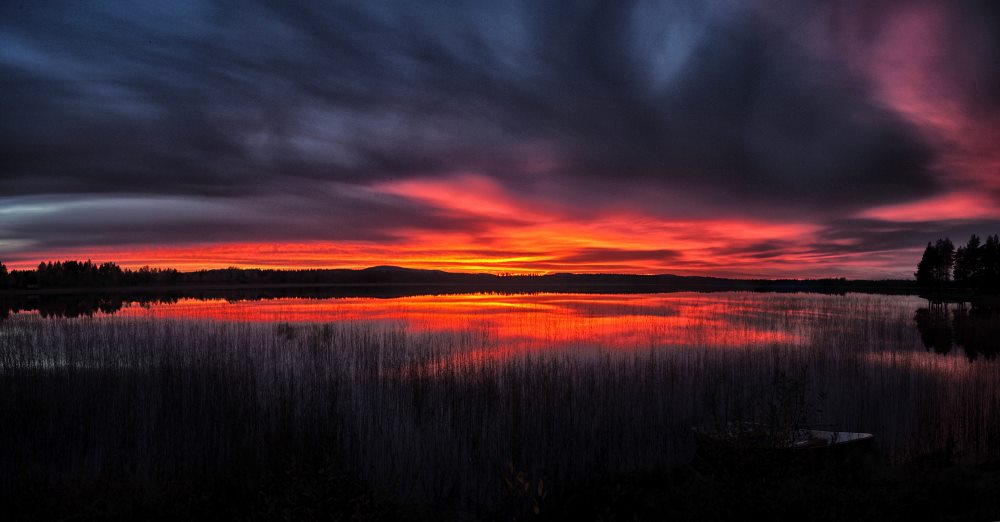

- Coat of arms

- Coordinates: 64°55′N 19°29′E
- Country: Sweden
- County: Västerbotten County
- Seat: Norsjö

Area
  - Total: 1,923.58 km^{2} (742.70 sq mi)
  - Land: 1,739.45 km^{2} (671.61 sq mi)
  - Water: 184.13 km^{2} (71.09 sq mi)
- Area as of 1 January 2014.

Population (30 June 2025)
  - Total: 3,886
  - Density: 2.234/km^{2} (5.786/sq mi)
- Time zone: UTC+1 (CET)
  - Summer (DST): UTC+2 (CEST)
- ISO 3166 code: SE
- Province: Västerbotten
- Municipal code: 2417
- Website: www.norsjo.se

Norsjö Municipality (Swedish: Norsjö kommun) is a municipality in Västerbotten County in northern Sweden. Its seat is located in Norsjö.

In 1974 Norsjö and Malå municipalities were amalgamated, forming the new Norsjö Municipality. In 1983 Malå Municipality was re-established within the pre-1974 borders.

== History ==
The first settlements in the area were probably first established during the 15th century. During the first centuries the settlers lived on fishing, hunting and agriculture.

== Localities ==
There are two localities (or urban areas) in Norsjö Municipality:

#	Locality	Population
1	**Norsjö**	2,102
2	Bastuträsk	357

The municipal seat in bold

== Demographics ==
This is a demographic table based on Norsjö Municipality's electoral districts in the 2022 Swedish general election sourced from SVT's election platform, in turn taken from SCB official statistics.

In total there were 3,967 residents, including 3,048 Swedish citizens of voting age. 55.0% voted for the left coalition and 44.0% for the right coalition. Indicators are in percentage points except population totals and income.

Location	Residents	Citizen adults	Left vote	Right vote	Employed	Swedish parents	Foreign heritage	Income SEK	Degree
Location			%	%					
Bastuträsk	685	522	59.2	40.1	80	79	21	21,339	27
Norsjö N	1,616	1,243	52.6	45.8	82	87	13	22,854	22
Norsjö S	1,666	1,283	55.5	43.8	90	94	6	25,276	26
Source: SVT

== Economy ==
Norsjö has traditionally been a major industrial municipality. The vast forests in the area have been the basis for many wood-based industrial sectors, including forest management, forest harvesting and replanting, timber transport, saw mills, manufactured products from wood, and wood as a renewable fuel for electrical and heat energy production.

A significant amount of renewable energy is produced in Norsjö Municipality, including electrical energy from hydropower stations and wood-based heat energy for industrial and household heating applications.

Metallic ore mining has also been a very prominent industrial factor over the years, with a number of mines operating in and around Norsjö Municipality which is in the Skellefteå Field mining district. Norsjö Municipality is only 50 km from the large regional mineral processing plant in nearby Boliden.

== Notable natives ==
- Tommy Körberg, artist
- Stieg Larsson, author and journalist
- Torgny Lindgren, author, member of the Swedish Academy
- Björn Yttling, musician and music producer
