= Alunda =

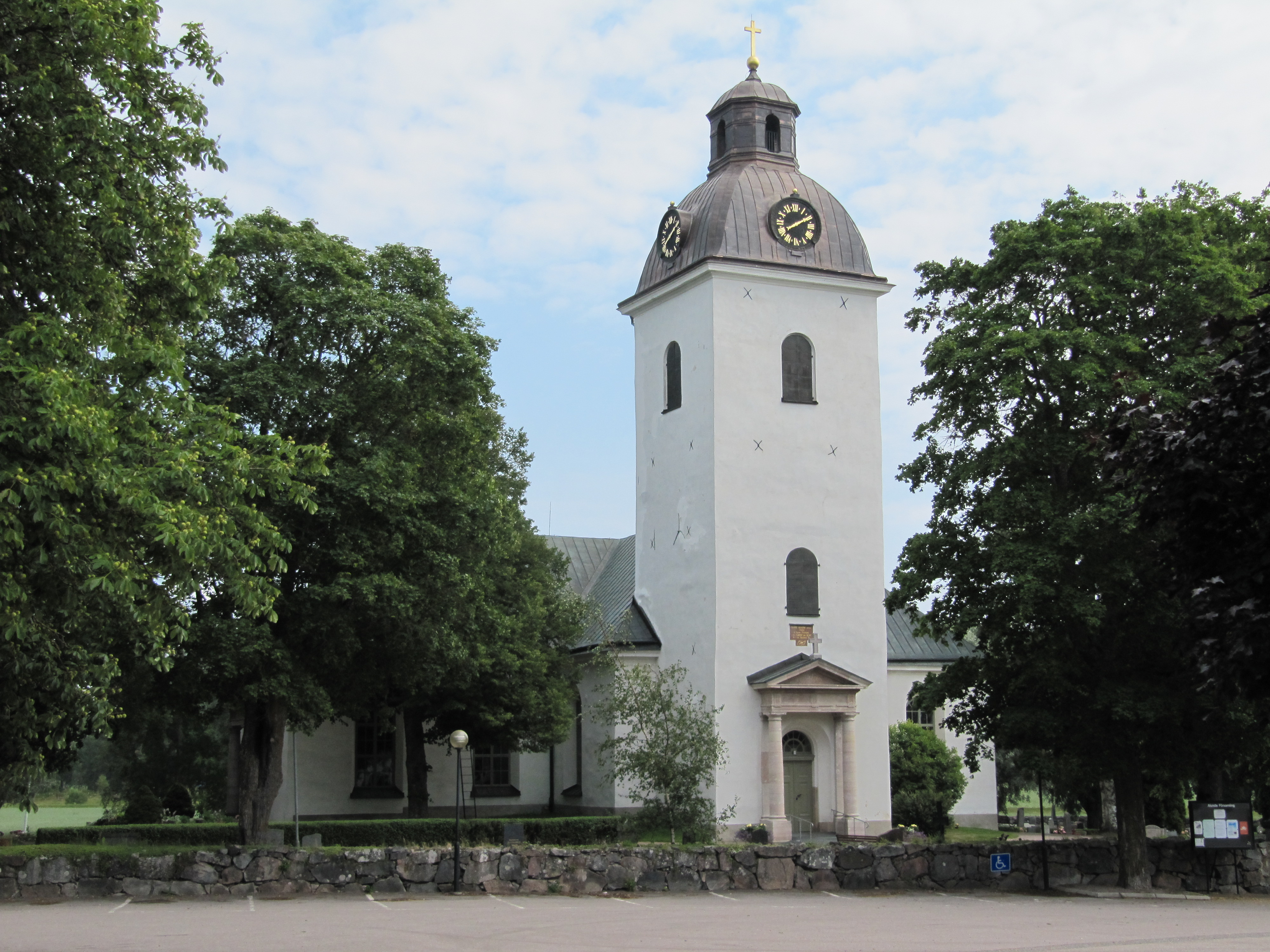
- Alunda Church

- Location within Uppsala Location within Sweden
- Coordinates: 60°03′N 18°04′E
- Country: Sweden
- Province: Uppland
- County: Uppsala County
- Municipality: Östhammar Municipality

Area
  - Total: 2.28 km^{2} (0.88 sq mi)

Population (31 December 2020)
  - Total: 2,642
  - Density: 1,160/km^{2} (3,000/sq mi)
- Time zone: UTC+1 (CET)
  - Summer (DST): UTC+2 (CEST)

Alunda is a locality situated in Östhammar Municipality, Uppsala County, Sweden with 2,317 inhabitants in 2010.
