= Lakaträsk =

Village in Sweden

Coordinates: 66°16′35″N 21°07′22″E

Lakaträsk is a village and until 2005 was a small town in Boden Municipality, located north of the lake Lakaträsket in Edefors parish. Despite the now small population in the area, Lakaträsk and its surroundings constitute its own area code with the number 0925.

Lakaträsk is located along the Iron Ore Line and has an old station building.
