= Bastuträsk =

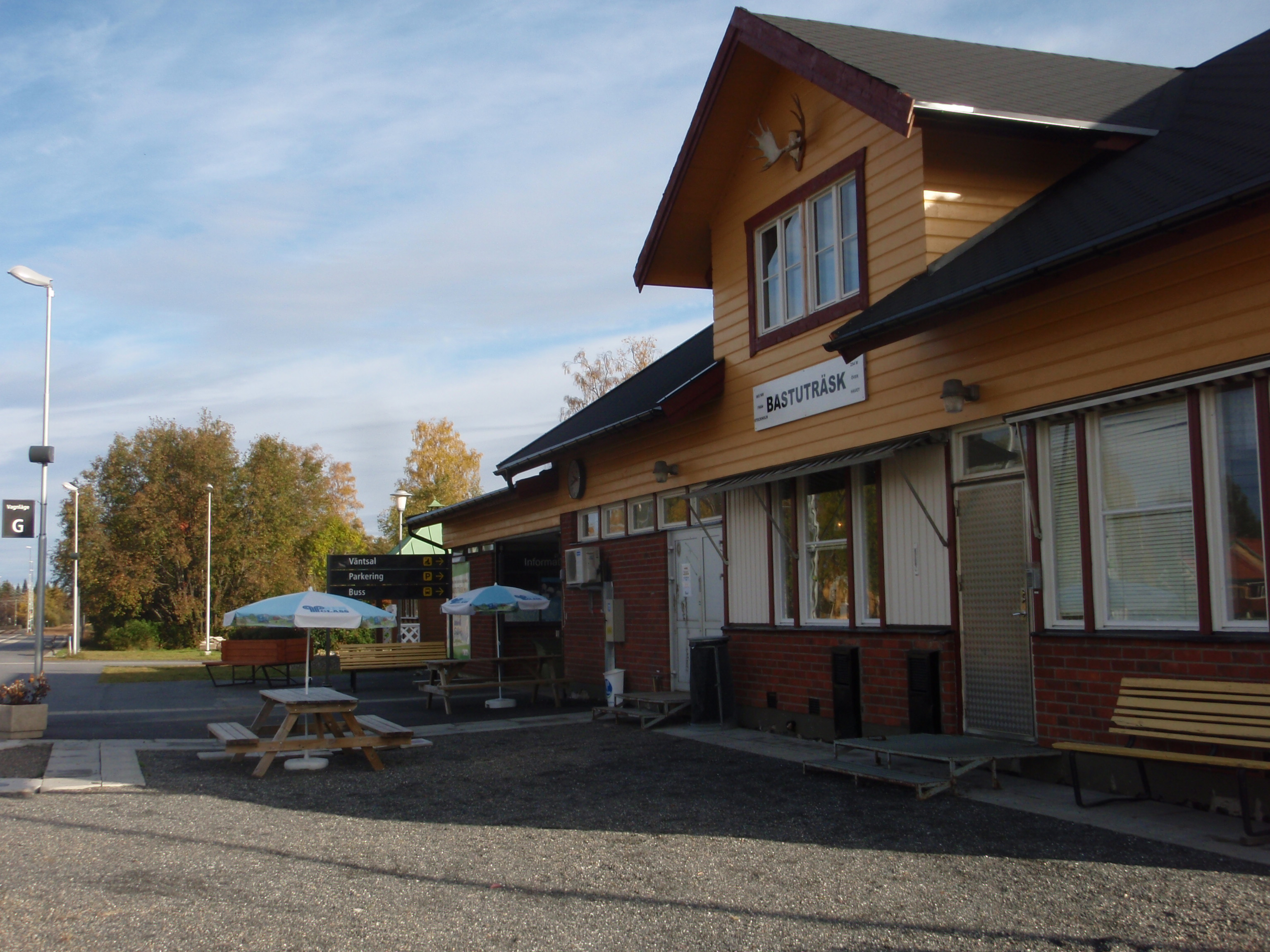
- Bastuträsk railway station

- Location within Västerbotten Location within Sweden
- Coordinates: 64°47′N 20°02′E
- Country: Sweden
- Province: Västerbotten
- County: Västerbotten County
- Municipality: Norsjö Municipality

Area
  - Total: 1.09 km^{2} (0.42 sq mi)

Population (31 December 2010)
  - Total: 392
  - Density: 359/km^{2} (930/sq mi)
- Time zone: UTC+1 (CET)
  - Summer (DST): UTC+2 (CEST)

Bastuträsk (Swedish pronunciation: [bastɵˈtrɛsːk];) is a locality situated in Norsjö Municipality, Västerbotten County, Sweden with 392 inhabitants in 2010.

The village was mainly constructed around its railway station being built there in 1892, when a railway line connecting Långsele and Boden opened. In the 1950s, Bastuträsk had as much as approximately 1000 inhabitants but has since then become strongly depopulated.

Bastuträsk has many small businesses, among those persistent for decades have been a sausage factory and a sawmill/woodshop.

It is also still a fairly trafficked railway hub, which serves Skellefteå (approximately 40 km to the east) via buses.

Approximately 5 kilometers north from the town, along the lake after which it is named (Bastuträsket) is the traditional village Bastuträsk By.

Bastuträsk is located just 200 km south of the Arctic Circle. With only three months of the year having average temperatures over 10 °C it features a subarctic climate which however like the rest of northern Sweden has surprisingly mild winters due to oceanic influences such as the Gulf Stream.

During his return journey in 1917, Vladimir Lenin passed Bastuträsk on the way to the Russian border in Haparanda-Tornio, getting off in order to change trains.

The name of the town is attested since 1619 and is named after the adjacent lake Bastuträsket, attested since 1553. The name consists of bastu ’fireplace-equipped building for temporary dwelling or food-drying’ + träsk ’large lake’.
