= Norsjö =

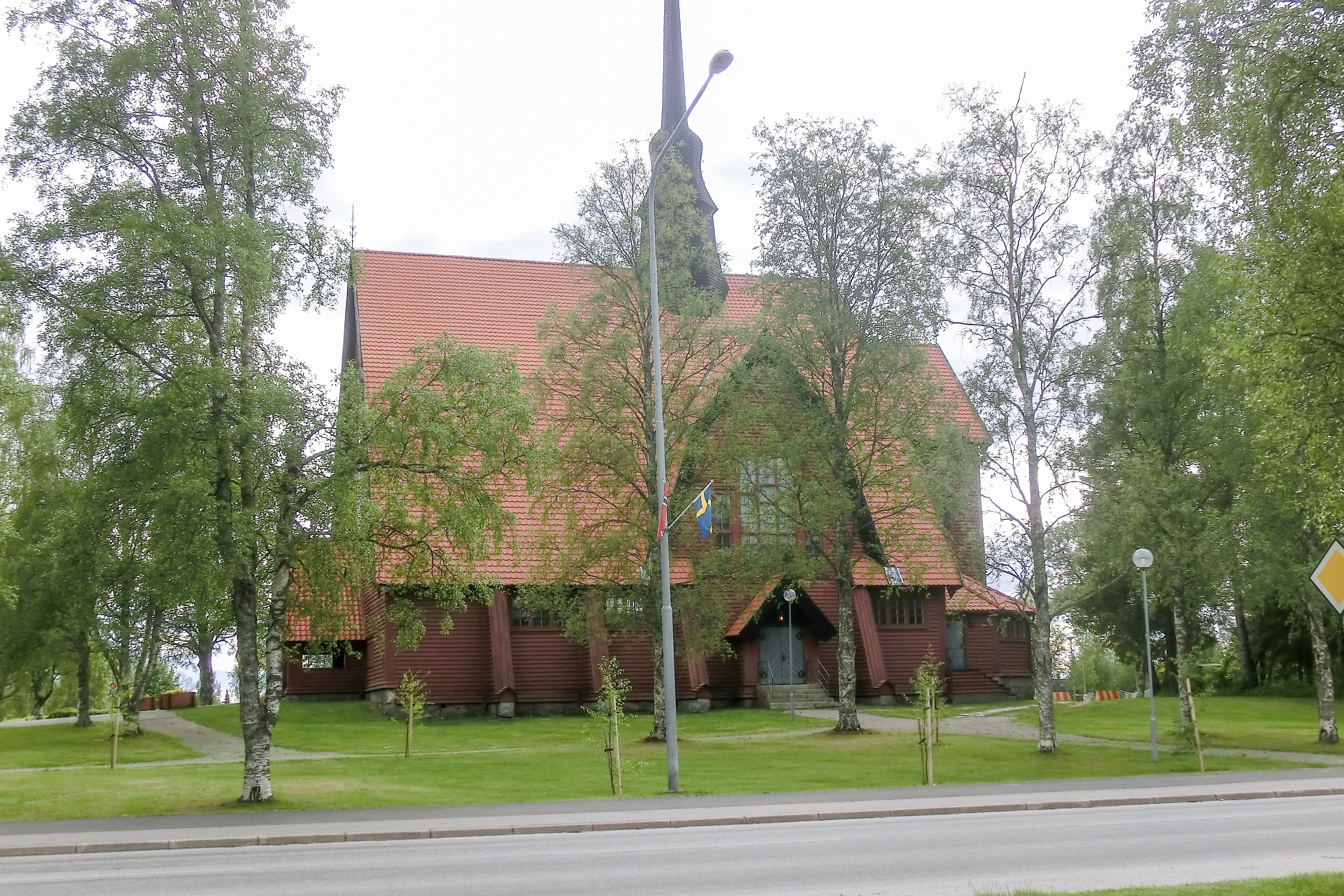
- Norsjö Church in June 2012

- Location within Västerbotten Location within Sweden
- Coordinates: 64°55′N 19°29′E
- Country: Sweden
- Province: Västerbotten
- County: Västerbotten County
- Municipality: Norsjö Municipality

Area
  - Total: 2.40 km^{2} (0.93 sq mi)

Population (31 December 2010)
  - Total: 2,051
  - Density: 854/km^{2} (2,210/sq mi)
- Time zone: UTC+1 (CET)
  - Summer (DST): UTC+2 (CEST)

Norsjö (Swedish pronunciation: [ˈnǔːrɧœ]) is a locality and the seat of Norsjö Municipality in Västerbotten County, Sweden, with 2,051 inhabitants in 2010. It is the birthplace of writer Torgny Lindgren, singer-actor-musician Tommy Körberg, and American author Charlotte Agell, who currently resides in Maine, United States.

Norsjö also plays a part in the Stieg Larsson novel The Girl with the Dragon Tattoo.
