= Östhammar =

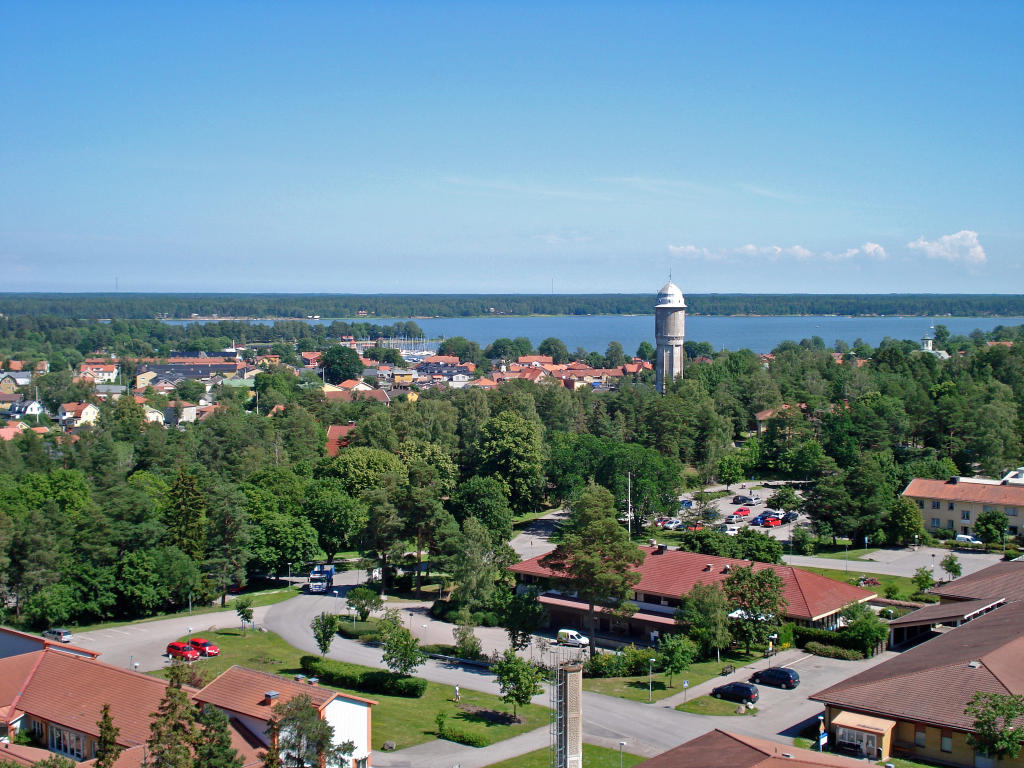
- Östhammar center

- Coat of arms

- Location within Uppsala Location within Sweden
- Coordinates: 60°16′N 18°22′E
- Country: Sweden
- Province: Uppland
- County: Uppsala County
- Municipality: Östhammar Municipality

Area
  - Total: 3.76 km^{2} (1.45 sq mi)

Population (31 December 2020)
  - Total: 4,976
  - Density: 1,320/km^{2} (3,430/sq mi)
- Time zone: UTC+1 (CET)
  - Summer (DST): UTC+2 (CEST)

Östhammar is a locality and the seat of Östhammar Municipality, Uppsala County, Sweden, with 4,534 inhabitants in 2010. Today Östhammar Municipality is a part of Uppsala County, but the area has historically been a part of Stockholm County.

== History ==
Östhammar's city status was granted by king Albert in 1368. During this period a castle called Östhammarshus was built, but already in 1434 the castle was burnt down by its Danish vogt, who fled to Denmark over the sea when faced with the Engelbrekt rebellion. By the late 15th century the post-glacial rebound had made it hard to reach Östhammar by boat and its city status was transferred to Öregrund. Östhammar regained its city status in 1538, and moved closer to the sea.

In 1651 Östhammar got a town hall, and in 1795 Östhammar was heavily damaged by fire. Between the early 17th century and the middle of the 19th century the fishing of herring played a very important role in Östhammar's economy.

== Sister cities ==
- Valka, Latvia
