= Öregrund =

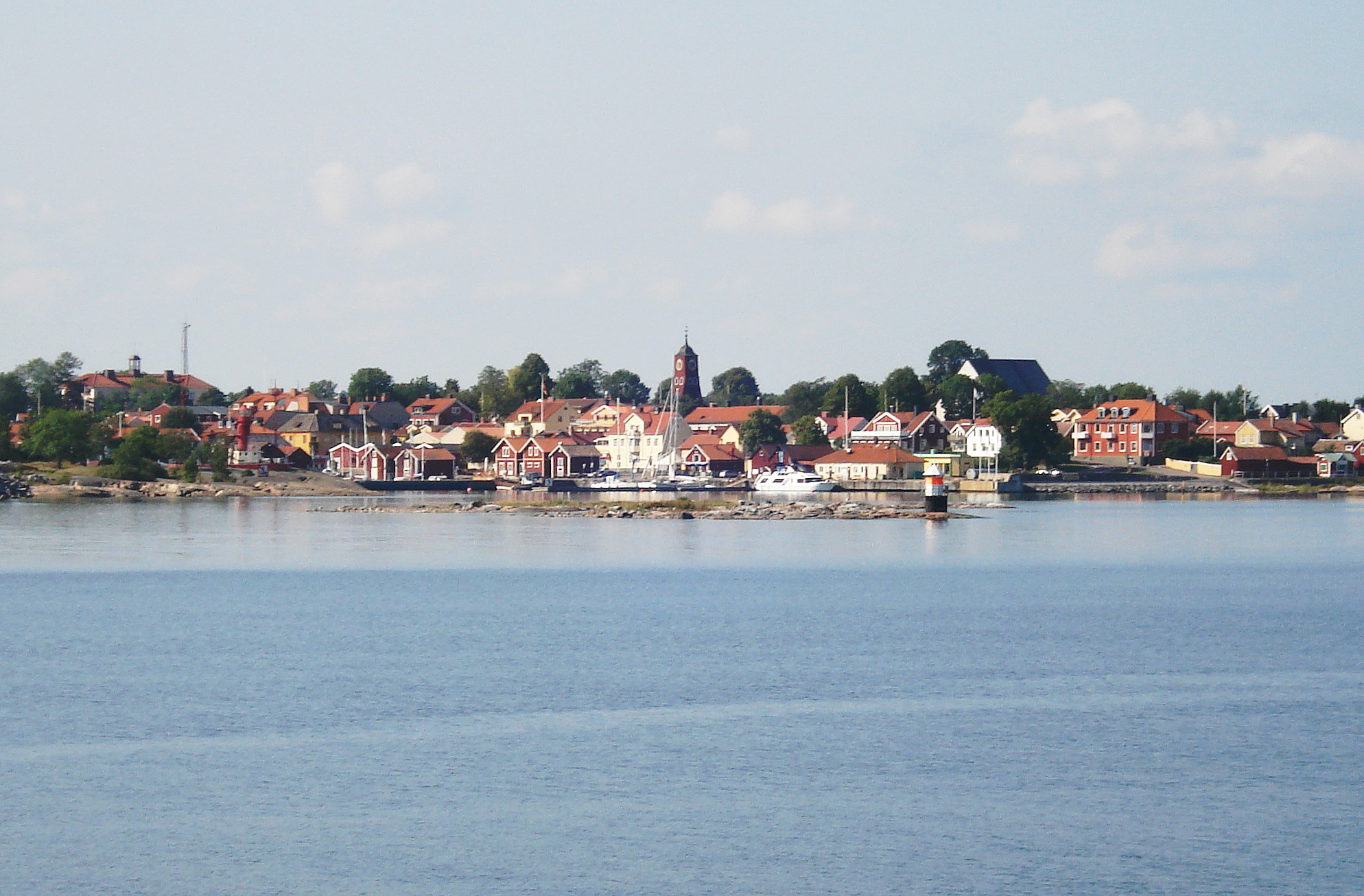
- Öregrund seen from a boat moving between Gräsö and Öregrund

- Location within Uppsala Location within Sweden
- Coordinates: 60°20′N 18°26′E
- Country: Sweden
- Province: Uppland
- County: Uppsala County
- Municipality: Östhammar Municipality

Area
  - Total: 2.44 km^{2} (0.94 sq mi)

Population (31 December 2020)
  - Total: 1,597
  - Density: 655/km^{2} (1,700/sq mi)
- Time zone: UTC+1 (CET)
  - Summer (DST): UTC+2 (CEST)

Öregrund is a locality situated in Östhammar Municipality, Uppsala County, Sweden. As of 2010, it had 1,555 inhabitants. It is located by the Baltic Sea, on the coast of Uppland. Despite its small population, Öregrund is still commonly referred to as a city for historical reasons.

== History ==
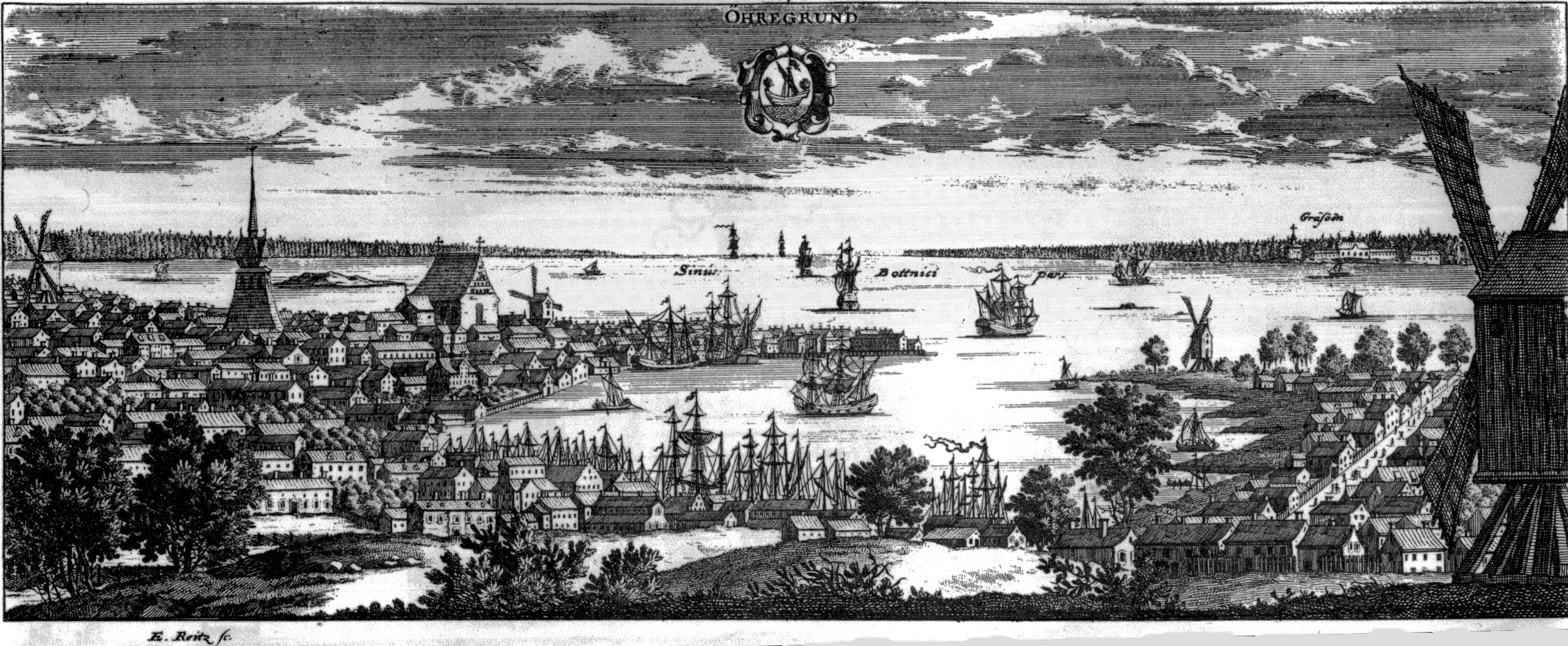
Öregrund circa 1700, in Suecia antiqua et hodierna

The town was granted a royal charter in 1491, by request from citizens from the nearby city of Östhammar. Östhammar had once been a coastal town, but due to post-glacial rebound its harbour had become useless. The royal council granted the request to construct a city at the end of the archipelago where the sea opened. It further proclaimed "the city shall forever be known as Öregrund". The small but expanding city soon became a point of conflict. In 1520 Christian II of Denmark conquered Stockholm. A young Gustav Eriksson tried to gather an army, and Öregrund became the port whereto ships with men and weapons were transported. As a countermeasure, the Danish King had the city burnt in the winter of 1520. And so, the citizens of Öregrund had to move back to Östhammar.

Not until 1555, when Gustav Eriksson had become King Gustav I of Sweden (Vasa) and stabilized the nation, were the citizens granted permission to reconstruct the city.

Uppland underwent an Industrial Revolution in the 17th century, with the Swedish iron industry becoming the foundation of Sweden's status as a Great Power. Bar iron was exported through Öregrund. In England the best quality wrought iron was known as Oregrounds iron.

Fishing was basically the only industry through the centuries. The industrialization of the 19th century never took hold in Öregrund, establishing itself in nearby Östhammar instead.

In the late 19th century a new industry prospered: the spas. People from outside built summer houses and made Öregrund their summer residence. During this era, several fine villas and gardens were built.

However, the summer residents led to decreased tax incomes for the economically troubled city. In 1968, Öregrund was merged with the then-city of Östhammar. Since the municipal reform of 1971, Öregrund is in Östhammar Municipality.

In 2017 Öregrund was used as scenery for the Dutch television show Kroongetuige (Crown Witness).

== Modern times ==
The hub of Öregrund is still the harbour. In modern times it is mainly used for small boats. In the summer it flourishes due to small sailboats and other pleasure boats. Boats also arrive from Stockholm, taking a trip from the Stockholm Archipelago.

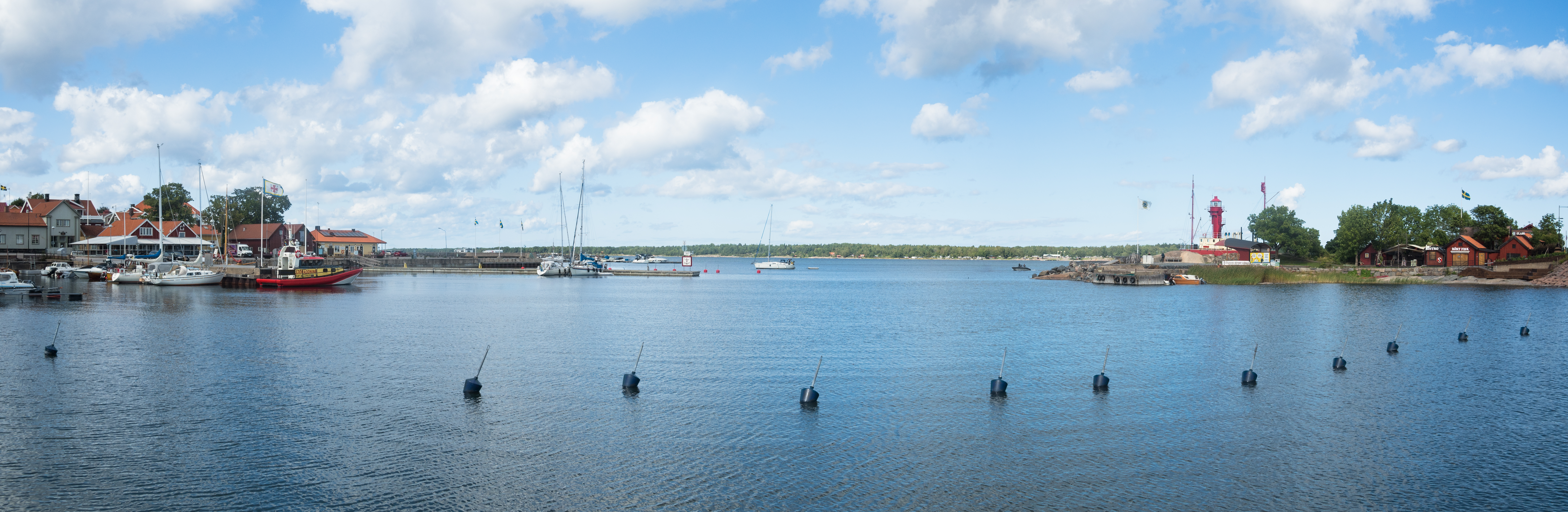
View of the Öregrund marina, looking north out to the Bothnian Sea in 2019. The marina is near town center, with restaurants on either side and the Vastra Banken lightship, a local landmark, to the right.

== Sights ==
Öregrund is one of Uppland's best kept wooden cities and attracts many visitors. Apart from the wooden houses, there is also a noteworthy stone church in the town center, and a town hall from the mid 19th century.
