= Results of the 1911 Swedish general election =

Sweden held a general election throughout September 1911, which was the first election with universal male suffrage.

== Results ==
Party	Votes	%	Seats	+/–
Free-minded National Association	242,795	40.20	102	–3
General Electoral League	188,691	31.24	64	–27
Swedish Social Democratic Party	172,196	28.51	64	+30
Other parties	292	0.05	0	New
Total	603,974	100.00	230	0
Valid votes	603,974	99.42		
Invalid/blank votes	3,506	0.58		
Total votes	607,480	100.00		
Registered voters/turnout	1,066,200	56.98		
Source: Nohlen & Stöver

== Regional results ==
=== Percentage share ===
Land	Share	Votes	F	AV	S
Götaland	52.5	316,982	35.9	40.1	24.0
Svealand	31.6	190,990	40.8	21.9	37.3
Norrland	15.9	96,002	53.4	20.5	26.1
Total	100.0	603,974	40.2	31.2	28.5
Source:SCB

=== By votes ===
Land	Share	Votes	F	AV	S	Other
Götaland	52.5	316,982	113,658	127,136	75,968	220
Svealand	31.6	190,990	77,898	41,890	71,150	52
Norrland	15.9	96,002	51,239	19,665	25,078	20
Total	100.0	603,974	242,975	188,691	172,196	292
Source:SCB

== County results ==
In this era, right after the dissolution of first past the post, many counties had multiple constituencies, hence the results are listed at county levels here, comparable with most latter constituencies. The sole exception is for Stockholm, where the county and the capital city had different counts in the official statistics.

All county names have had their spellings modernized from contemporary spelling in this article. There were 292 votes for others than the three main parties, a total of 0.048%.

=== Percentage share ===
Location	Land	Share	Votes	F	AV	S
Blekinge	G	2.0	12,263	34.8	38.1	27.2
Gothenburg-Bohus	G	5.2	31,526	34.8	42.2	22.9
Gotland	G	0.8	5,073	33.6	56.6	9.8
Gävleborg	N	4.7	28,687	37.3	17.3	45.4
Halland	G	2.8	16,751	31.6	50.3	18.1
Jämtland	N	2.4	14,671	68.9	17.9	13.1
Jönköping	G	4.5	27,276	32.0	53.0	14.9
Kalmar	G	3.9	23,837	36.1	49.9	13.9
Kopparberg	S	4.2	25,107	42.6	18.1	39.3
Kristianstad	G	4.7	28,135	50.1	25.7	24.2
Kronoberg	G	3.1	18,869	29.1	53.0	17.9
Malmöhus	G	8.6	51,642	25.8	27.9	46.3
Norrbotten	N	1.8	10,596	42.3	18.3	39.3
Skaraborg	G	5.0	30,402	50.2	37.6	12.1
Stockholm (city)	S	5.7	34,401	25.6	27.5	46.8
Stockholm County	S	3.2	19,479	34.2	28.3	37.4
Södermanland	S	3.7	22,254	44.7	16.8	38.5
Uppsala	S	2.8	16,809	45.5	26.2	28.3
Värmland	S	4.8	29,140	52.5	18.0	29.5
Västerbotten	N	2.8	16,915	71.9	26.3	1.8
Västernorrland	N	4.2	25,133	54.9	22.6	22.5
Västmanland	S	3.4	20,496	39.6	20.9	39.5
Älvsborg	G	6.0	36,093	39.1	44.9	15.8
Örebro	S	3.9	23,304	46.1	20.1	33.8
Östergötland	G	5.8	35,115	33.6	34.9	31.4
Total		100.0	603,974	40.2	31.2	28.5
Source: SCB

=== By votes ===
Location	Land	Share	Votes	F	AV	S	Other
Blekinge	G	2.0	12,263	4,264	4,667	3,331	1
Gothenburg-Bohus	G	5.2	31,526	10,977	13,297	7,229	23
Gotland	G	0.8	5,073	1,703	2,871	497	2
Gävleborg	N	4.7	28,687	10,691	4,965	13,031	
Halland	G	2.8	16,751	5,288	8,424	3,036	3
Jämtland	N	2.4	14,671	10,112	2,633	1,924	2
Jönköping	G	4.5	27,276	8,741	14,446	4,071	18
Kalmar	G	3.9	23,837	8,616	11,896	3,321	4
Kopparberg	S	4.2	25,107	10,695	4,534	9,871	7
Kristianstad	G	4.7	28,135	14,082	7,244	6,796	13
Kronoberg	G	3.1	18,869	5,483	10,002	3,371	13
Malmöhus	G	8.6	51,642	13,316	14,393	23,889	44
Norrbotten	N	1.8	10,596	4,486	1,938	4,169	3
Skaraborg	G	5.0	30,402	15,274	11,433	3,684	11
Stockholm (city)	S	5.7	34,401	8,811	9,472	16,105	13
Stockholm County	S	3.2	19,479	6,660	5,515	7,292	12
Södermanland	S	3.7	22,254	9,938	3,748	8,564	4
Uppsala	S	2.8	16,809	7,644	4,411	4,754	
Värmland	S	4.8	29,140	15,295	5,239	8,598	8
Västerbotten	N	2.8	16,915	12,154	4,447	310	4
Västernorrland	N	4.2	25,133	13,796	5,682	5,644	11
Västmanland	S	3.4	20,496	8,110	4,284	8,098	4
Älvsborg	G	6.0	36,093	14,116	16,194	5,708	75
Örebro	S	3.9	23,304	10,745	4,687	7,868	4
Östergötland	G	5.8	35,115	11,798	12,269	11,035	13
Total		100.0	603,974	242,795	188,691	172,196	292
Source: SCB
