= Arvid Lindman =

Prime minister of Sweden from 1906 to 1911 and 1928 to 1930

His Excellency Arvid Lindman
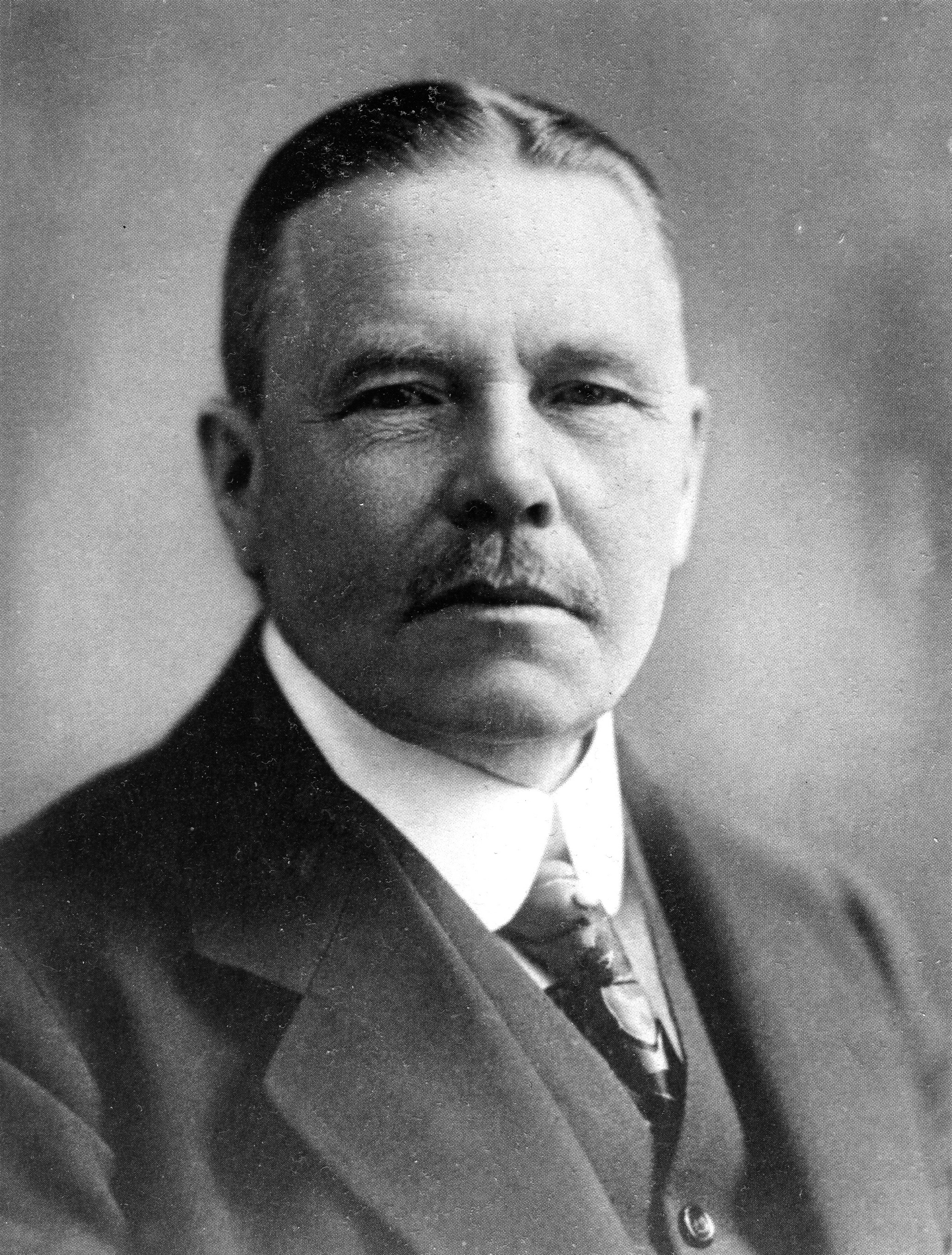

Prime Minister of Sweden
- In office 2 October 1928 – 7 June 1930
- Monarch: Gustaf V
- Preceded by: Carl Gustaf Ekman
- Succeeded by: Carl Gustaf Ekman
- In office 29 May 1906 – 7 October 1911
- Monarchs: Oscar II (1906–1907); Gustaf V (1907–1911)
- Preceded by: Karl Staaff
- Succeeded by: Karl Staaff

Minister of Foreign Affairs
- In office 30 March 1917 – 19 October 1917
- Prime Minister: Carl Swartz
- Preceded by: Knut Wallenberg
- Succeeded by: Johannes Hellner

Personal details
- Born: Salomon Arvid Achates Lindman; 19 September 1862 Österbybruk, Sweden
- Died: 9 December 1936 (aged 74) Croydon, England
- Cause of death: Aircraft crash
- Resting place: Norra begravningsplatsen
- Party: General Electoral Union
- Spouse: Annie Almström (m. 1888)
- Children: 3
- Education: Hudiksvalls högre allmänna läroverk
- Alma mater: Royal Swedish Naval Academy
- Occupation: Industrialist • politician
- Cabinet: Lindman I Lindman II
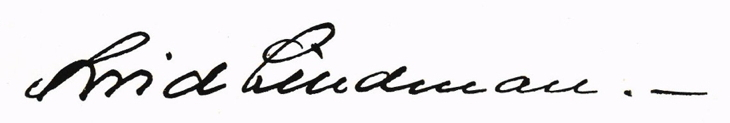
- Signature
- Nickname: The Admiral

Military service
- Branch/service: Swedish Navy
- Years of service: 1882–1889; 1889–1905 (reserve)
- Rank: Rear admiral

Salomon Arvid Achates Lindman (19 September 1862 – 9 December 1936) was a Swedish statesman and naval officer who served as prime minister of Sweden from 1906 to 1911 and again from 1928 to 1930. He was leader of the Allmänna Valmansförbundet (General Electoral League) from 1912 to 1935. He was a member of the Riksdag for 30 years, first of the upper house from 1905 to 1911, and then of the lower house from 1912 to 1935. Referred to as The Admiral (Amiralen), Lindman played a key role in the passage of universal male suffrage and electoral reform.

He was also leader of the Lantmanna and bourgeois Party (Lantmanna- och borgarepartiet; a member party of the AVF) from 1913 to 1935, except for a brief period in 1917 when he was minister for foreign affairs.

== Early life ==
Salomon Arvid Achates Lindman was born on 19 September 1862 in Österbybruk, Uppsala County, Sweden, the son of Emil Achates Lindman, a mill director, and Ebba Dahlgren. The family name derives from the Lindrum farm in Ölsremma parish, Älvsborg County.

After studying at Hudiksvall's secondary school, Lindman entered the Royal Swedish Navy Academy in 1876 aged 14. Among his classmates were banker and industrialist Marcus Wallenberg Sr. (father of SAAB founder Marcus Wallenberg Jr.), prince Oscar Bernadotte, and navy officer Henning von Krusenstierna, the last of whom he became close friends with. Upon his graduation in 1882, he had earned the highest grades possible, and was regarded by mentors as a highly promising future naval officer. He became a sub-lieutenant in October 1882 and served aboard the Vanadis expedition from December 1883 to April 1885. He was promoted to lieutenant in 1887 and transferred to the naval reserve two years later in 1889, although he remained active and was promoted to captain in 1892. His naval career earned him the nickname "the Admiral", by which he was widely known throughout his later political life.

== Career ==
=== Industrial career ===
Lindman also proved farsighted and capable as an industrial leader when he, in 1889, left his naval career to enter the service of the Iggesund Ironworks Company, owned by the Tamm family. Lindman's father was at that time head of both Iggesund and the Tamm family's Österby and Strömbacka estates. In 1892, Lindman became managing director of Iggesund Ironworks, a position he held until 1903, when the company was sold to Hudiksvall Timber Ltd through his efforts. Strömbacka was excluded from the sale, and Lindman remained head of Strömbacka Ironworks Ltd until 1923, when it was sold to Iggesund Ironworks, still with Lindman as chairman of the board and a member of Iggesunds board of directors.

Through his friend Marcus Wallenberg, he received an offer to become head of LKAB, a position he held for just over a year (1900–1901), during which he oversaw major investments and the construction of housing for LKAB employees. His experiences in the role proved valuable in the negotiations that, in 1907, led to the state's acquisition of partial ownership in LKAB. In 1904, he accepted the role as Director General of Televerket, Sweden's national telecommunications agency. He also held board positions in several other major companies, including Husqvarna Vapenfabriks AB.

=== Early political career ===
Lindman declined as early as 1897 an offer to run for the First Chamber of the Riksdag. He later also refused an attempt by Prime Minister Erik Gustaf Boström to recruit him as Minister of Finance in 1902. However, he was eventually elected to the First Chamber by the Gävleborg County Council in 1904, becoming its youngest member. When the Lundeberg cabinet was formed in August 1905 to resolve the union crisis with Norway, Lindman became Minister for Naval Affairs. As such, he was required to hold a military rank and was therefore promoted to Commander; two years later, he was made Rear Admiral in the reserve. Had he instead obtained the role of Minister for Civil Affairs, as he had wished, he would likely never have received the admiral's title. When the Lundeberg government resigned later in 1905, there were already plans for a possible right-wing or moderate-liberal ministry under Lindman. Karl Staaff later offered him the post of Minister to London, but he declined over financial reasons.

=== First Premiership (1906–1911) ===
During the 1906 Riksdag session, Lindman was elected to the council of the Protectionist Party and became a member of the Law Committee. After Karl Staaff and his government resigned after an unsuccessful attempt at implementing electoral reform, the Minister of Agriculture, Alfred Petersson and the Minister for Foreign Affairs, Fredrik Wachtmeister, both declined the opportunity of forming and leading a new cabinet as head of government. The task eventually passed to Lindman, who accepted. His government did not have an overtly right-wing profile; he sought support also among moderate liberals.

Lindman was initially sceptical of proportional representation in both chambers, but was keen on achieving a settlement. A major constitutional reform was carried through, though only after considerable concessions to radical demands. Universal suffrage for men in Second Chamber elections and the introduction of a 40-degree graduated franchise scale in municipal elections were only steps on the road towards fully universal and equal suffrage in both municipal and parliamentary elections.

From the government's perspective, the main victory lay in having established the proportional electoral system and in warding off the threat to the First Chamber's equal status with the Second. Conservative critics, however, predicted that the 40-degree scale would soon be abolished and that the ultimate result would be a unicameral parliament with proportional representation, leading to increased party control and rigid political blocs.

The Riksdag of 1907 has been described as "the Riksdag of great decisions". Besides the suffrage question, this referred above all to the agreement concerning the Norrbotten ore fields (LKAB). The Lindman government was active on many fronts: over its five and a half years in office, it submitted more than 1,100 government bills, of which remarkably few were rejected. More than 200 committees were appointed, including one on old-age and disability pensions.

==== Conflicts within the Right ====
Lindman was said to represent a new type of prime minister. As an industrialist, he was in tune with the major transformations then under way in economic policy. Ivar Anderson writes in his biography that, during his first premiership, Lindman "had a certain tendency to regard his colleagues as a business leader sees his department heads".

Both principled and personal disagreements lay behind several ministerial reshuffles involving Erik Trolle, Lars Tingsten, and Alfred Petersson. Tingsten and Petersson would later became some of Lindman most fierce opponents. Tensions also existed within the conservative camp. Many conservative members of First Chamber mistrusted Lindman's willingness to compromise. Among these was the prominent arch-conservative statesman Ernst Trygger, whose election as leader of the Protectionist Party in 1909 had been unsuccessfully opposed by Lindman. Relations between Lindman and Trygger remained cold and strained. Trygger saw him as "dangerously inclined to sacrifice conservative principles", whereas Lindman, in Anderson's words, was "outgoing, practical, impulsive, and eager to achieve results."

The government resigned after the expected conservative setback in the 1911 election. Lindman assumed the role as Leader of the Opposition, while also beginning the work that would become his life's major political project: the creation of a solid and well-organised Conservative Party.

=== Between premierships (1911–1928) ===
Lindman subsequently entered the Second Chamber in 1912, where he became chairman of the Lantmanna and bourgeois Party (Swedish: Lantmanna- och borgarpartiet) in 1913. In 1917, he briefly served as Minister for Foreign Affairs in Carl Swartz's cabinet. As a senior conservative figure, Lindman advised the King on forming the Hammarskjöld and Swartz governments, aiming to prevent Ernst Trygger's hardline faction from taking power.

From 1913 to 1935, Lindman chaired the General Electoral League (Allmänna valmansförbundet) — the national organization of Sweden's right-wing parties and the direct predecessor of today's Moderate Party. As party leader, he modernized the conservative movement after the introduction of universal male suffrage in 1918, establishing an effective national structure, pioneering campaign flights and poster advertising, and professionalizing election strategy.

=== Cossack election and second premiership (1928–1930) ===
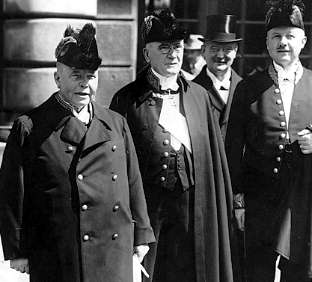
Arvid Lindman (left) and Ernst Trygger (center) at the Courtyard of Stockholm Palace, 1928.

After a bitter election campaign in 1928, during which the Social Democrats suffered heavy losses, Lindman again became prime minister, leading a minority right-wing government. His cabinet promoted industrial peace through a Conference on Labor Relations in 1928 and pursued moderate protectionist policies.

The government resigned in 1930 after the Free-Minded Liberals and Social Democrats blocked a proposal to increase tariffs on grain — meant to support Sweden's agricultural sector. The interwar years that followed were marked by parliamentary fragmentation and short-lived minority governments.

== Personal life and death ==
Arvid Lindman married Annie Almström in 1888. The couple had three children, including Gunnar Lindman, who later became an engineer and industrialist.

Outside of politics, he was active in business associations and charitable causes connected to education and naval affairs. He was also a keen traveller.

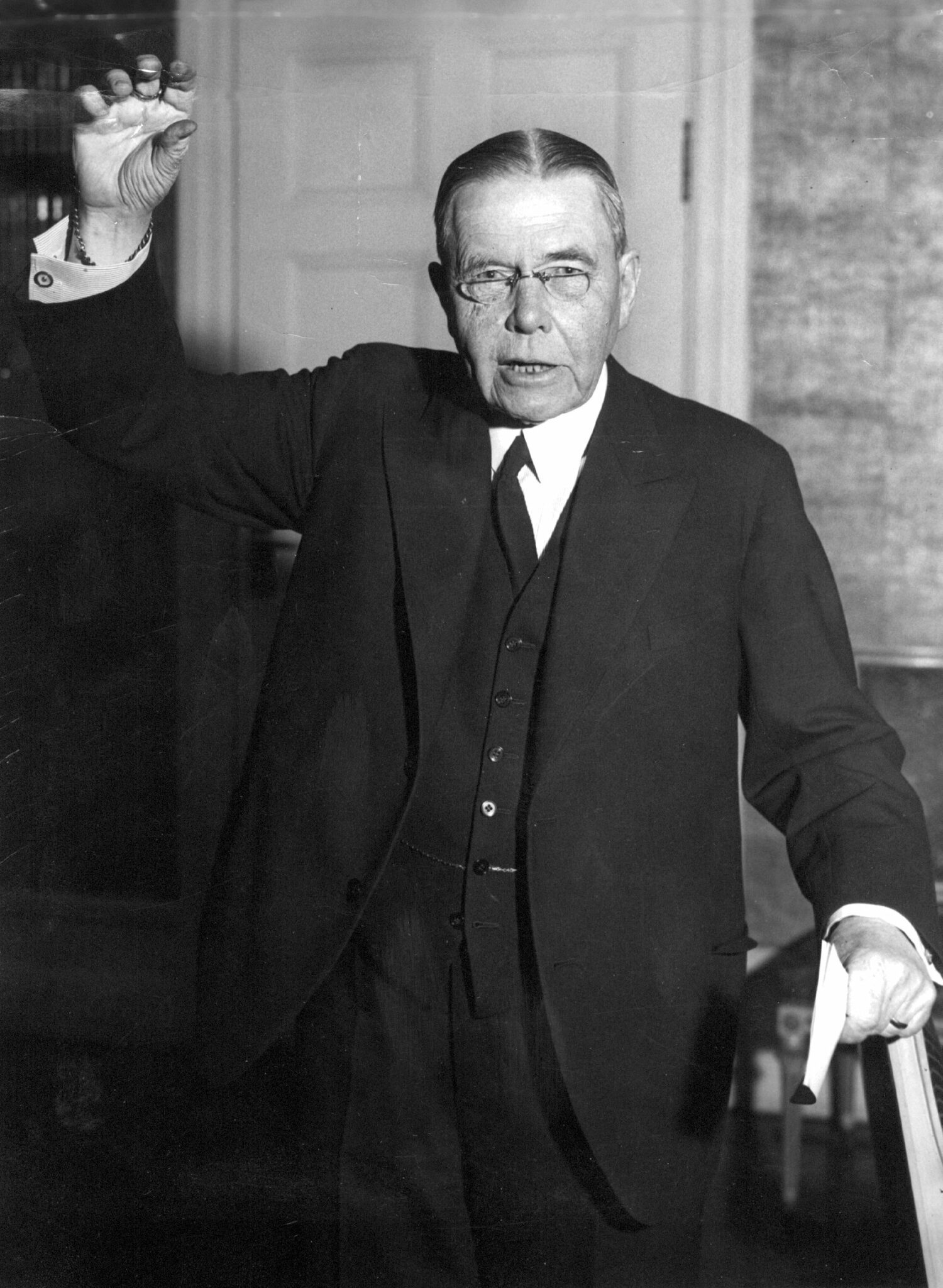
Lindman c. 1930–1935

Lindman died on 9 December 1936 in a plane crash near Croydon Airport, London, when a Douglas DC-2 aircraft struck houses shortly after takeoff in thick fog. He was 74 years old.

== Legacy ==
A modern, charismatic campaigner, Lindman was among the first Swedish politicians to address voters directly through mass meetings and travel. He was also known for his reserved but courteous personality and for his deep sense of duty and moderation in both public and private life.

He also took an early and unequivocal stance against Fascism and Nazism. When the party's youth organization adopted authoritarian sympathies, Lindman expelled it from the movement. Upon his retirement as party leader in 1935, Prime Minister Per Albin Hansson of the Social Democrats expressed "honest thanks across the battle lines" in tribute to Lindman's integrity and moderation.

Lindman is remembered as a pragmatic conservative and skilled conciliator, known for combining firmness with compromise. He sought to bridge divides between labor and business and between conservatives and liberals.

Political offices
Preceded by Louis Palander	Minister for Naval Affairs; 1905–1905	Succeeded by Ludvig Sidner
Preceded by Karl Staaff	Prime Minister of Sweden; 1906–1911	Succeeded by Karl Staaff
Preceded by Knut Wallenberg	Minister for Foreign Affairs; 1917–1917	Succeeded by Johannes Hellner
Preceded by Carl Gustaf Ekman	Prime Minister of Sweden; 1928–1930	Succeeded by Carl Gustaf Ekman
