= Swedish general election, 1914 =

Two Swedish general elections were held in 1914:

- The Swedish general election of 27 March 1914
- The Swedish general election of 25 September 1914

== See also ==
- Elections in Sweden
