= Results of the 1920 Swedish general election =

Sweden held a general election in September 1920. The election was the last before universal suffrage was introduced the following year. The Social Democratic Party remained the largest party, winning 75 of the 230 seats in the Second Chamber of the Riksdag. In spite of this, the non-socialist parties got a sizeable majority in the chamber.

== Results ==
Party	Votes	%	Seats	+/–
Swedish Social Democratic Party	195,121	29.65	75	–11
General Electoral League	183,019	27.81	71	+14
Free-minded National Association	143,355	21.78	47	–15
Farmers' League	52,318	7.95	20	+9
Social Democratic Left Party	42,056	6.39	7	–4
National Farmers' Association	40,623	6.17	10	+5
Other parties	1,691	0.26	0	0
Total	658,183	100.00	230	0
Valid votes	658,183	99.70		
Invalid/blank votes	2,011	0.30		
Total votes	660,194	100.00		
Registered voters/turnout	1,192,922	55.34		
Source: Nohlen & Stöver

== County results ==
1920 was the final occasion which saw nearly all counties split into multiple constituencies based on geography, before a mixed urban/rural single constituency with different allocations was introduced for the following year. Courtesy of Stockholm's size and it being the national capital, Stockholm County was separated into two separate counting areas and were thus listed separately in the contemporary statistics for counties. In Halland and Örebro counties, the two agrarian parties ran as one. This renders differences between the results published at a constituency and county level and the national results, thus in this table the agrarian coalition has been listed separately. A similar instance happened in the Norrköping and Linköping constituency where the Free-minded nationals and the Democratic Citizen Association decided on their joint list votes electing a representative for the latter. The list also consisted of the General Electoral League, which marked the foundation of the non-socialist bloc. In the county-wide tables, these votes were listed for the Free-minded nationals.

=== Percentage share ===
Location	Land	Share	Votes	S	AV	F	B	V	J	B/J	Other	Left	Right	Margin
Location		%		%	%	%	%	%	%	%	%	%	%	
Blekinge	G	1.9	12,724	28.7	34.9	23.1	4.1	1.8	7.4	0.0	0.0	30.5	69.5	4,961
Gothenburg-Bohus	G	5.8	38,196	33.4	32.1	21.7	2.3	3.0	7.6	0.0	0.0	36.3	63.7	10,430
Gotland	G	0.9	6,005	11.7	24.3	14.6	0.0	0.0	49.4	0.0	0.0	11.7	88.3	4,603
Gävleborg	N	4.1	26,840	37.2	10.7	20.6	20.5	11.1	0.0	0.0	0.0	48.3	51.7	906
Halland	G	3.0	19,638	20.4	32.3	14.6	0.0	2.1	0.0	30.5	0.0	22.5	77.5	10,793
Jämtland	N	2.3	15,388	12.3	23.1	34.9	4.1	13.8	11.9	0.0	0.0	26.1	73.9	7,359
Jönköping	G	4.7	30,883	17.0	39.7	19.6	10.6	6.0	6.9	0.0	0.0	23.0	76.9	16,637
Kalmar	G	3.7	24,677	16.5	49.7	14.1	10.0	5.6	4.2	0.0	0.0	22.0	78.0	13,801
Kopparberg	S	4.2	27,710	30.8	9.1	25.2	19.6	15.4	0.0	0.0	0.0	46.1	53.9	2,145
Kristianstad	G	4.4	29,190	29.9	28.0	32.9	0.0	2.1	7.1	0.0	0.0	31.9	68.1	10,552
Kronoberg	G	2.9	18,788	19.6	42.8	15.8	10.3	4.4	7.1	0.0	0.0	24.1	75.9	9,747
Malmöhus	G	9.0	58,957	50.3	24.9	12.7	0.0	0.3	11.7	0.0	0.0	50.6	49.4	751
Norrbotten	N	2.4	15,835	8.0	29.3	20.1	6.3	29.3	6.9	0.0	0.0	37.3	62.7	4,017
Skaraborg	G	4.5	29,905	16.8	33.4	22.4	23.8	3.7	0.0	0.0	0.0	20.5	79.5	17,673
Stockholm	S	7.8	51,440	44.0	37.0	13.7	0.0	5.3	0.0	0.0	0.0	49.3	50.7	720
Stockholm County	S	3.6	23,601	40.9	29.9	15.2	4.6	3.9	5.4	0.0	0.0	44.8	55.1	2,429
Södermanland	S	3.4	22,513	43.7	16.5	27.5	0.0	2.7	9.5	0.0	0.0	46.4	53.6	1,601
Uppsala	S	2.6	16,886	34.0	19.8	25.5	11.3	7.1	2.3	0.0	0.0	41.1	58.9	2,995
Värmland	S	4.7	30,699	28.6	19.3	32.7	4.7	10.7	4.0	0.0	0.0	39.3	60.7	6,568
Västerbotten	N	3.1	20,533	2.6	33.8	51.5	0.0	3.5	8.5	0.0	0.0	6.2	93.8	18,002
Västernorrland	N	4.1	26,817	15.3	17.4	27.5	13.1	21.8	4.9	0.0	0.0	37.1	62.9	6,923
Västmanland	S	2.7	18,021	36.2	13.7	21.9	17.8	10.4	0.0	0.0	0.0	46.6	53.4	1,219
Älvsborg	G	5.4	35,438	20.9	37.4	19.4	20.7	1.6	0.0	0.0	0.0	22.5	77.4	19,459
Örebro	S	3.5	23,197	36.7	18.5	28.4	6.4	4.6	0.0	5.4	0.0	41.3	58.6	4,011
Östergötland	G	5.2	34,302	35.5	25.7	17.8	0.0	4.4	16.7	0.0	0.0	39.9	60.1	6,929
Total		100.0	658,183	29.7	27.8	22.0	7.4	6.4	5.6	1.1	0.3	36.0	63.9	183,729
Source: SCB

=== By votes ===
Location	Land	Share	Votes	S	AV	F	B	V	J	B/J	Other	Left	Right	Margin
Location		%												
Blekinge	G	1.9	12,724	3,657	4,440	2,936	527	224	939		1	3,881	8,842	4,961
Gothenburg-Bohus	G	5.8	38,196	12,750	12,261	8,291	862	1,132	2,898		2	13,882	24,312	10,430
Gotland	G	0.9	6,005	701	1,458	878			2,968			701	5,304	4,603
Gävleborg	N	4.1	26,840	9,977	2,859	5,524	5,489	2,989			2	12,966	13,872	906
Halland	G	3.0	19,638	4,011	6,348	2,873		411		5,994	1	4,422	15,215	10,793
Jämtland	N	2.3	15,388	1,893	3,556	5,363	624	2,121	1,830		1	4,014	11,373	7,359
Jönköping	G	4.7	30,883	5,254	12,272	6,067	3,272	1,863	2,143		12	7,117	23,754	16,637
Kalmar	G	3.7	24,677	4,067	12,275	3,478	2,459	1,370	1,026		2	5,437	19,238	13,801
Kopparberg	S	4.2	27,710	8,523	2,532	6,973	5,420	4,257			5	12,780	14,925	2,145
Kristianstad	G	4.4	29,190	8,715	8,180	9,613		602	2,076		4	9,317	19,869	10,552
Kronoberg	G	2.9	18,788	3,688	8,045	2,974	1,931	832	1,317		1	4,520	14,267	9,747
Malmöhus	G	9.0	58,957	29,666	14,676	7,514		182	6,907		12	29,848	29,097	751
Norrbotten	N	2.4	15,835	1,267	4,645	3,190	994	4,642	1,097			5,909	9,926	4,017
Skaraborg	G	4.5	29,905	5,016	9,982	6,685	7,122	1,100				6,116	23,789	17,673
Stockholm	S	7.8	51,440	22,618	19,035	7,033		2,730			24	25,348	26,068	720
Stockholm County	S	3.6	23,601	9,655	7,058	3,589	1,080	929	1,286		4	10,584	13,013	2,429
Södermanland	S	3.4	22,513	9,847	3,716	6,200		608	2,140		2	10,455	12,056	1,601
Uppsala	S	2.6	16,886	5,742	3,340	4,303	1,912	1,203	385		1	6,945	9,940	2,995
Värmland	S	4.7	30,699	8,776	5,923	10,037	1,457	3,289	1,216		1	12,065	18,633	6,568
Västerbotten	N	3.1	20,533	537	6,938	10,583		727	1,745		3	1,264	19,266	18,002
Västernorrland	N	4.1	26,817	4,113	4,667	7,367	3,523	5,833	1,312		2	9,946	16,869	6,923
Västmanland	S	2.7	18,021	6,529	2,470	3,944	3,205	1,871			2	8,400	9,619	1,219
Älvsborg	G	5.4	35,438	7,414	13,248	6,859	7,339	573			5	7,987	27,446	19,459
Örebro	S	3.5	23,197	8,516	4,292	6,578	1,478	1,074		1,253	6	9,590	13,601	4,011
Östergötland	G	5.2	34,302	12,189	8,803	6,094		1,494	5,715		7	13,683	20,612	6,929
Total		100.0	658,183	195,121	183,019	144,946	48,694	42,056	37,000	7,247	100	237,177	420,906	183,729
Source: SCB

== Results by city and district ==
=== Blekinge ===
Location	Share	Votes	S	AV	F	B	V	J	Left	Right
Bräkne	15.1	1,923	28.7	34.8	12.9	7.4	1.6	14.7	30.2	69.8
Karlshamn	5.4	683	28.7	42.8	27.1	0.0	1.5	0.0	30.2	69.8
Karlskrona	20.4	2,593	34.1	38.7	26.3	0.0	0.9	0.0	35.0	65.0
Lister	17.8	2,260	22.9	38.3	24.1	6.5	1.8	6.3	24.7	75.2
Medelstad	20.6	2,615	29.5	27.9	18.4	9.1	3.6	11.6	33.1	66.9
Ronneby	2.9	368	31.8	41.3	25.0	0.0	1.1	0.8	32.9	67.1
Sölvesborg	3.1	395	35.9	31.6	30.4	0.0	2.0	0.0	38.0	62.0
Östra	14.8	1,887	25.3	32.0	30.9	0.1	0.7	11.0	26.1	73.9
Total	1.9	12,724	28.7	34.9	23.1	4.1	1.8	7.4	30.5	69.5
Source: SCB

=== Gothenburg and Bohuslän ===
There was a difference of one vote in the official tally for the southern constituency and the hundred/city numbers (10,899 vs 10,900). This caused a slight divergence of the numbers of ballots cast and the individual districts.

Location	Share	Votes	S	AV	F	B	V	J	Left	Right
Askim	4.8	1,831	40.4	17.0	16.5	17.9	2.8	5.5	43.1	56.9
Bullaren	0.5	209	0.5	60.8	30.6	4.3	0.5	3.3	1.0	99.0
Gothenburg	50.7	19,356	43.7	31.6	19.9	0.0	4.2	0.0	48.0	52.0
Inlands Fräkne	1.4	527	9.3	33.8	31.7	0.0	0.0	25.2	9.3	90.7
Inlands Nordre	3.3	1,261	8.6	37.7	26.2	0.0	0.0	27.4	8.6	91.4
Inlands Södre	2.3	885	4.5	39.0	9.0	6.9	0.0	40.6	4.5	95.5
Inlands Torpe	1.2	450	47.6	14.4	9.6	0.0	0.0	28.4	47.6	52.4
Kungälv	0.6	244	38.1	48.0	13.9	0.0	0.0	0.0	38.1	61.9
Kville	1.5	580	14.3	20.3	32.1	12.6	0.0	20.7	14.3	85.7
Lane	2.1	818	11.1	47.9	26.5	4.8	0.1	22.5	11.2	88.8
Lysekil	1.1	422	30.1	49.8	14.0	0.0	5.9	0.2	36.0	64.0
Marstrand	0.4	145	6.2	37.2	49.0	0.0	7.6	0.0	13.8	86.2
Orust Västra	2.8	1,059	2.5	55.3	30.1	0.1	0.0	11.9	2.5	97.5
Orust Östra	1.3	487	8.8	35.5	32.4	0.2	0.4	22.6	9.2	90.8
Sotenäs	2.7	1,029	31.2	25.4	36.2	0.4	4.0	2.8	35.2	64.8
Strömstad	0.6	221	14.0	51.6	32.1	0.0	2.3	0.0	16.3	83.7
Stångenäs	2.0	769	19.6	56.6	19.9	0.1	0.8	3.0	20.4	79.6
Sävedal	5.0	1,923	51.0	17.5	10.5	7.7	5.5	7.9	56.4	43.6
Sörbygden	1.4	533	0.0	61.4	6.8	2.1	0.0	29.8	0.0	100.0
Tanum	1.6	614	12.4	55.7	17.1	14.3	0.2	0.3	12.5	87.5
Tjörn	1.6	606	6.6	20.0	48.8	0.0	0.0	24.6	6.6	93.4
Tunge	2.1	802	32.7	28.7	22.7	0.9	0.1	15.0	32.8	67.2
Uddevalla	3.3	1,244	38.1	29.0	30.8	0.0	2.1	0.0	40.2	59.8
Vette	1.8	699	27.2	21.9	19.9	12.9	1.9	16.3	29.0	71.0
Västra Hising	3.6	1,378	9.8	22.0	27.2	0.1	0.7	40.1	10.5	89.4
Östra Hising	0.3	103	10.7	1.0	1.9	0.0	0.0	86.4	10.7	89.3
Total	5.8	38,196	33.4	32.1	21.7	2.3	3.0	7.6	36.3	63.7
Source: SCB

=== Gotland ===
Location	Share	Votes	S	AV	F	J	Left	Right
Gotland Norra	40.7	2,446	11.7	21.1	9.6	57.6	11.7	88.3
Gotland Södra	47.5	2,855	7.0	18.9	20.0	54.0	7.0	93.0
Visby	11.7	704	30.5	57.0	10.2	2.3	30.5	69.5
Total	0.9	6,005	11.7	24.3	14.6	49.4	11.7	88.3
Source: SCB

=== Gävleborg ===
Location	Share	Votes	S	AV	F	B	V	Left	Right
Ala	10.0	2,693	48.5	3.1	13.8	27.7	6.9	55.4	44.6
Arbrå-Järvsö	5.2	1,401	28.1	6.1	31.8	26.1	7.9	36.0	64.0
Bergsjö-Forsa	10.8	2,904	32.2	6.4	23.0	33.1	5.3	37.5	62.5
Bollnäs ting	15.2	4,073	38.0	8.2	22.8	24.4	6.6	44.6	55.4
Delsbo	4.1	1,093	36.3	7.9	9.1	44.0	2.7	39.0	61.0
Enånger	2.6	708	37.6	6.9	16.9	30.8	7.8	45.3	54.7
Gästrikland Västra	13.8	3,706	30.1	5.7	20.9	23.5	19.8	49.9	50.1
Gästrikland Östra	14.3	3,842	36.8	7.0	19.5	12.9	23.9	60.6	39.4
Gävle	11.7	3,142	40.0	27.9	22.2	0.2	9.7	49.7	50.3
Hudiksvall	2.4	642	27.4	25.2	31.0	4.5	11.8	39.3	60.7
Ljusdal	6.2	1,674	44.1	11.7	18.4	19.1	6.7	50.8	49.2
Söderhamn	3.6	962	44.8	33.4	17.0	0.2	4.6	49.4	50.6
Total	4.1	26,840	37.2	10.7	20.6	20.5	11.1	48.3	51.7
Source: SCB

=== Halland ===
Location	Share	Votes	S	AV	F	V	B/J	Left	Right
Falkenberg	2.9	575	37.0	41.4	16.9	2.6	2.1	39.7	60.3
Faurås	13.0	2,560	12.4	36.2	8.6	0.9	42.0	13.3	86.7
Fjäre	12.1	2,368	10.1	22.9	5.5	0.4	61.1	10.5	89.5
Halmstad	11.1	2,182	35.8	40.6	18.8	4.4	0.4	40.2	59.7
Halmstad hundred	12.1	2,371	26.9	37.2	14.6	2.0	19.3	28.9	71.1
Himle	8.8	1,730	8.6	31.3	24.6	2.5	33.0	11.1	88.9
Hök	12.8	2,518	13.8	15.4	19.3	1.4	50.0	15.2	84.8
Kungsbacka	0.9	178	29.2	50.6	15.2	3.4	1.7	32.6	67.4
Laholm	1.5	297	32.0	29.3	20.5	0.7	17.5	32.7	67.3
Tönnersjö	9.0	1,773	37.3	33.1	16.9	3.8	8.9	41.1	58.9
Varberg	3.3	650	30.6	38.5	26.8	3.1	1.1	33.7	66.3
Viske	3.7	731	8.6	23.1	17.0	0.3	54.2	5.7	94.3
Årstad	8.7	1,705	16.5	44.6	4.2	2.5	32.3	18.9	81.1
Total	3.0	19,638	20.4	32.3	14.6	2.1	30.5	22.5	77.5
Source: SCB

=== Jämtland ===
Location	Share	Votes	S	AV	F	B	V	J	Left	Right
Berg	4.6	708	10.2	19.2	43.2	0.0	14.4	13.0	24.6	75.4
Hammerdal	11.0	1,691	13.5	33.9	25.3	8.3	11.0	7.9	24.5	75.5
Hede	3.8	591	0.3	10.8	42.5	0.0	42.8	3.6	43.1	56.9
Lits-Rödön	18.0	2,766	15.0	20.2	39.0	7.2	5.8	12.8	20.8	79.2
Ragunda	11.7	1,797	11.8	17.0	25.3	0.0	29.6	16.3	41.4	58.6
Revsund-Brunflo-Näs	14.8	2,279	14.1	19.2	36.0	0.0	14.1	16.5	28.3	71.7
Sunne-Oviken-Hallen	9.2	1,420	9.4	17.2	46.1	16.1	2.3	9.1	11.6	88.4
Sveg	5.2	797	0.3	22.2	37.0	0.0	36.0	4.5	36.3	63.7
Undersåker-Offerdal	13.3	2,041	15.4	19.7	37.2	2.8	7.8	17.1	23.2	76.8
Östersund	8.4	1,298	14.9	50.7	24.0	0.0	6.7	3.7	21.6	78.4
Total	2.3	15,388	12.3	23.1	34.9	4.1	13.8	11.9	26.1	73.9
Source: SCB

=== Jönköping ===
Location	Share	Votes	S	AV	F	B	V	J	Left	Right
Eksjö	2.5	767	20.2	46.2	24.4	0.4	8.9	0.0	29.1	70.9
Gränna	3.4	1,065	36.1	35.4	15.8	0.0	12.7	0.1	48.7	51.3
Huskvarna	3.5	1,096	37.4	31.3	13.0	0.0	18.3	0.0	55.7	44.3
Jönköping	11.9	3,665	28.6	41.3	24.7	0.0	5.4	0.1	34.0	66.0
Mo	3.9	1,215	4.9	57.4	25.2	0.0	1.5	10.9	6.4	93.6
Norra Vedbo	6.2	1,905	10.9	45.5	21.1	17.9	4.5	0.0	15.4	84.5
Nässjö	0.4	136	7.4	64.7	27.2	0.0	0.7	0.0	8.1	91.9
Södra Vedbo	7.3	2,246	18.9	29.1	13.2	30.0	8.7	0.0	27.6	72.3
Tranås	2.1	636	25.0	31.1	29.9	0.2	13.5	0.0	38.5	61.2
Tveta	9.2	2,834	20.6	49.6	15.9	0.0	8.2	5.7	28.8	71.2
Vetlanda	1.3	389	32.9	38.3	18.0	2.1	8.7	0.0	41.6	58.4
Vista	3.2	992	4.2	77.7	10.5	0.0	2.9	4.6	7.2	92.8
Västbo	14.8	4,577	9.1	33.9	20.8	0.0	5.2	31.0	14.3	85.6
Västra	10.6	3,266	11.4	26.9	18.3	40.4	2.9	0.0	14.3	85.6
Östbo	11.1	3,436	13.2	56.0	17.0	0.0	2.8	11.0	16.0	84.0
Östra	8.6	2,658	14.9	19.0	25.5	34.8	5.8	0.0	20.7	79.3
Total	4.7	30,883	17.0	39.7	19.6	10.6	6.0	6.9	23.0	76.9
Source: SCB

=== Kalmar ===
Location	Share	Votes	S	AV	F	B	V	J	Left	Right
Algutsrum	3.0	735	13.2	68.7	3.1	0.3	0.5	14.1	13.7	86.3
Aspeland	7.0	1,718	14.4	58.7	15.2	4.5	7.2	0.0	21.6	78.4
Borgholm	0.5	122	19.7	37.7	37.7	4.9	0.0	0.0	19.7	80.3
Gräsgård	2.6	643	31.3	44.6	11.5	0.3	0.0	12.1	31.3	68.6
Handbörd	6.6	1,617	17.4	61.0	11.4	0.1	6.7	3.5	24.1	75.9
Kalmar	5.3	1,317	25.5	55.8	16.2	0.0	2.4	0.1	27.9	72.1
Möckleby	1.8	432	1.9	83.6	3.7	1.6	0.0	9.0	1.9	97.9
Norra Möre	5.4	1,335	23.7	53.2	9.4	0.0	1.3	12.4	25.0	75.0
Norra Tjust	8.2	2,025	18.7	52.6	10.1	9.1	9.5	0.0	28.2	71.8
Oskarshamn	2.7	667	26.5	42.9	28.0	0.0	2.5	0.0	29.1	70.9
Runsten	2.2	537	1.1	52.1	6.5	32.8	6.3	1.1	2.2	97.8
Sevede	8.6	2,133	7.4	49.3	13.9	21.2	8.3	0.0	15.7	84.3
Slättbo	1.6	407	7.9	35.4	4.2	41.8	3.4	7.4	11.3	88.7
Stranda	6.1	1,512	24.3	43.9	14.5	0.0	4.1	13.2	28.4	71.6
Södra Möre	15.6	3,856	18.6	44.1	17.6	8.8	2.6	8.3	21.2	78.8
Södra Tjust	10.3	2,539	17.7	38.8	15.9	18.3	9.3	0.0	27.1	72.9
Tunalän	5.0	1,231	3.6	61.1	16.3	13.1	5.9	0.0	9.5	90.5
Vimmerby	1.4	357	9.0	59.9	21.6	2.2	7.3	0.0	16.2	83.8
Västervik	3.7	915	18.7	39.7	21.3	0.3	20.0	0.0	38.7	61.3
Åkerbo	2.3	579	3.6	22.6	3.5	70.1	0.2	0.0	3.8	96.2
Total	3.7	24,677	16.5	49.7	14.1	10.0	5.6	4.2	22.0	78.0
Source: SCB

=== Kopparberg ===
Location	Share	Votes	S	AV	F	B	V	Left	Right
Avesta	2.2	619	50.6	16.0	14.9	0.0	18.4	69.0	30.9
Falu Norra	9.7	2,680	27.5	11.5	23.0	17.1	20.8	48.3	51.6
Falu Södra	11.0	3,041	34.1	9.4	15.0	26.0	15.4	49.5	50.5
Falun	4.1	1,139	36.1	38.3	19.2	0.6	5.8	41.9	58.1
Folkare	7.0	1,935	38.7	17.5	17.3	18.8	7.6	46.4	53.6
Hedemora	1.4	395	30.6	30.6	26.6	8.9	3.3	33.9	66.1
Hedemora	8.4	2,331	29.4	9.1	9.0	42.5	10.0	39.4	60.6
Leksand-Gagnef	11.6	3,210	13.3	0.0	44.3	22.4	20.0	33.2	66.7
Ludvika	2.2	621	55.6	22.2	9.2	0.6	12.4	68.0	32.0
Malung	5.6	1,538	29.8	8.0	41.4	8.8	12.1	41.9	58.1
Mora	6.9	1,902	18.3	0.0	65.0	5.7	10.9	29.3	70.7
Nås	6.8	1,882	32.1	8.6	12.6	23.1	23.6	55.7	44.3
Orsa	2.4	676	19.8	0.0	37.6	36.2	6.4	26.2	73.8
Rättvik	5.2	1,454	8.5	0.0	32.6	37.3	21.6	30.1	69.9
Särna-Idre	0.7	186	12.9	0.0	48.4	16.7	22.0	34.9	65.1
Säter	0.7	201	50.7	14.9	21.4	2.0	10.9	61.7	38.3
Västerbergslag	12.2	3,381	52.7	8.2	9.0	12.8	17.3	69.9	30.0
Älvdalen	1.9	519	23.7	0.0	35.6	22.4	18.3	42.0	58.0
Total	4.2	27,710	30.8	9.1	25.2	19.6	15.4	46.1	53.9
Source: SCB

=== Kristianstad ===
Location	Share	Votes	S	AV	F	V	J	Left	Right
Albo	4.7	1,359	17.9	16.4	59.5	1.7	4.6	19.6	80.4
Bjäre	5.6	1,647	17.2	53.9	9.5	0.1	19.4	17.2	82.8
Gärd	10.2	2,983	34.1	16.9	45.6	1.9	1.5	36.0	64.0
Hässleholm	1.6	462	43.3	31.2	21.6	1.9	1.9	45.2	54.8
Ingelstad	11.4	3,327	30.9	19.8	40.5	0.2	8.5	31.1	68.8
Järrestad	3.8	1,102	32.4	20.5	36.7	1.0	9.4	33.4	66.6
Kristianstad	4.5	1,301	29.1	41.4	28.4	1.1	0.0	30.2	69.8
Norra Åsbo	11.2	3,257	30.2	39.2	19.6	0.5	10.4	30.7	69.2
Simrishamn	1.0	292	47.9	36.3	15.8	0.0	0.0	47.9	52.1
Södra Åsbo	7.4	2,165	42.9	35.0	6.9	0.0	15.2	42.9	57.1
Villand	10.2	2,971	32.8	24.6	31.2	8.9	2.6	41.7	58.3
Västra Göinge	14.4	4,214	20.4	21.7	48.4	1.6	7.9	22.0	78.0
Ängelholm	2.3	680	54.7	34.7	7.9	2.6	0.0	57.4	42.6
Östra Göinge	11.8	3,430	27.6	28.5	35.4	3.4	5.1	31.1	68.9
Total	4.4	29,190	29.9	28.0	32.9	2.1	7.1	31.9	68.1
Source: SCB

=== Kronoberg ===
Location	Share	Votes	S	AV	F	B	V	J	Left	Right
Allbo	19.4	3,636	20.2	46.6	14.4	13.9	2.0	2.9	22.2	77.8
Kinnevald	10.7	2,016	12.5	55.5	11.7	9.0	4.4	6.9	16.9	83.1
Konga	19.1	3,580	24.6	38.0	12.5	11.4	5.5	7.9	30.1	69.9
Norrvidinge	6.2	1,168	16.3	30.8	13.4	8.7	2.7	28.0	19.0	81.0
Sunnerbo	24.6	4,623	14.6	50.0	21.5	4.1	2.3	7.5	16.9	83.1
Uppvidinge	15.4	2,885	27.1	27.6	14.5	18.8	8.1	3.8	35.3	64.7
Växjö	4.7	880	19.8	45.9	22.8	0.2	11.3	0.0	31.0	69.0
Total	2.9	18,788	19.6	42.8	15.8	10.3	4.4	7.1	24.1	75.9
Source: SCB

=== Malmöhus ===
Location	Share	Votes	S	AV	F	V	J	Left	Right
Bara	5.1	2,996	57.3	21.7	8.6	0.0	12.4	57.3	42.7
Eslöv	1.4	797	49.9	38.3	11.7	0.1	0.0	50.1	49.9
Frosta	5.6	3,329	25.7	12.0	41.7	0.6	20.0	26.3	73.7
Färs	5.0	2,941	28.5	12.6	41.7	0.0	17.2	28.5	71.4
Harjager	3.1	1,838	47.0	23.9	7.1	1.3	20.6	48.3	51.6
Herrestad	1.9	1,116	52.3	10.7	25.7	0.0	11.3	52.3	47.7
Hälsingborg	9.0	5,298	51.1	40.5	8.4	0.0	0.0	51.1	48.9
Landskrona	3.9	2,306	68.4	23.3	8.2	0.0	0.0	68.4	31.5
Ljunit	1.6	936	42.6	15.8	28.5	0.0	13.0	42.6	57.4
Luggude	10.8	6,370	55.5	11.8	4.3	0.0	28.4	55.5	44.5
Lund	4.2	2,466	48.6	40.0	11.4	0.0	0.0	48.6	51.4
Malmö	20.0	11,779	58.3	35.8	4.8	1.1	0.0	59.4	40.6
Onsjö	4.1	2,406	43.6	9.7	5.9	0.0	40.9	43.6	56.4
Oxie	4.8	2,827	56.6	22.8	6.8	0.3	13.4	56.9	43.1
Rönneberg	3.2	1,867	51.0	22.9	5.9	0.0	20.2	51.0	49.0
Skanör-Falsterbo	0.1	79	27.8	43.0	29.1	0.0	0.0	27.8	72.2
Skytt	2.9	1,736	41.5	30.1	17.0	0.0	10.3	41.5	58.5
Torna	4.8	2,815	43.4	18.4	14.6	0.0	23.6	43.4	56.6
Trälleborg	1.9	1,092	56.7	23.5	18.9	0.1	0.7	56.8	43.1
Vemmenhög	4.9	2,881	44.9	21.3	22.0	0.0	11.8	44.9	55.1
Ystad	1.8	1,082	59.7	31.1	9.1	0.1	0.1	59.8	40.2
Total	9.0	58,957	50.3	24.9	12.7	0.3	11.7	50.6	49.4
Source: SCB

=== Norrbotten ===
Location	Share	Votes	S	AV	F	B	V	J	Left	Right
Arjeplog	0.7	112	17.0	19.6	16.1	0.0	47.3	0.0	64.3	35.7
Arvidsjaur	3.6	573	0.9	31.8	20.1	6.5	32.5	8.4	33.3	66.7
Boden	3.6	568	16.4	46.8	13.6	0.0	23.2	0.0	39.6	60.4
Gällivare	9.3	1,480	11.0	36.3	4.7	0.5	49.1	0.0	58.4	41.6
Haparanda	1.1	180	8.9	67.2	14.4	0.0	9.4	0.0	18.3	81.7
Jokkmokk	2.6	414	3.4	29.2	19.1	3.6	44.4	0.2	47.8	52.2
Jukkasjärvi	7.6	1,206	19.5	21.4	7.1	0.1	51.9	0.0	71.4	28.6
Karesuando	0.1	23	0.0	100.0	0.0	0.0	0.0	0.0	0.0	100.0
Korpilombolo	0.8	132	5.3	41.7	31.1	2.3	19.7	0.0	25.0	75.0
Luleå	6.0	956	14.3	46.2	13.0	0.0	26.3	0.2	40.6	59.4
Nederkalix	10.7	1,687	4.7	31.5	14.5	14.0	29.9	5.3	34.7	65.3
Nederluleå	9.6	1,513	3.3	30.9	27.4	0.1	14.6	23.6	17.9	82.1
Pajala	1.2	190	8.4	33.2	19.5	34.2	4.7	0.0	13.2	86.8
Piteå	1.4	221	10.9	49.3	22.2	0.0	15.8	1.8	26.7	73.3
Piteå ting	14.5	2,290	7.4	23.6	28.2	1.0	24.9	14.8	32.3	67.7
Råneå	7.0	1,102	6.1	26.8	26.3	3.4	30.0	7.4	36.1	63.9
Torneå	5.0	799	6.5	29.9	40.6	4.5	18.3	0.3	24.8	75.2
Älvsby	3.4	534	6.0	19.1	18.7	0.2	24.7	31.3	30.7	69.3
Överkalix	4.1	648	2.5	8.2	20.7	41.7	27.0	0.0	29.5	70.5
Överluleå	7.6	1,207	6.0	18.0	26.1	21.4	28.2	0.4	34.1	65.9
Total	2.4	15,835	8.0	29.3	20.1	6.3	29.3	6.9	37.3	62.7
Source: SCB

=== Skaraborg ===
Location	Share	Votes	S	AV	F	B	V	Left	Right
Barne	6.0	1,781	8.1	44.4	25.9	20.8	0.8	8.9	91.1
Falköping	2.4	707	28.3	40.2	25.6	0.1	5.8	34.1	65.9
Frökind	1.4	407	4.7	48.9	12.5	33.9	0.0	4.7	95.3
Gudhem	4.8	1,446	17.6	36.2	21.5	21.6	3.0	20.7	79.3
Hjo	1.0	306	16.0	52.0	28.4	1.3	2.3	18.3	81.7
Kinne	4.5	1,342	19.0	27.0	36.5	7.7	9.8	28.8	71.2
Kinnefjärding	3.3	977	14.1	30.9	27.9	25.1	1.9	16.1	83.9
Kåkind	5.9	1,771	14.2	20.8	20.6	40.0	4.3	18.6	81.4
Kålland	4.7	1,405	9.5	37.7	29.9	20.7	2.2	11.7	88.3
Laske	2.9	855	7.4	38.8	26.0	25.1	2.7	10.1	89.9
Lidköping	2.6	767	32.5	42.9	15.8	0.0	8.9	41.3	58.7
Mariestad	2.0	605	31.6	43.6	18.2	0.5	6.1	37.7	62.3
Skara	1.9	582	20.1	39.3	33.7	0.0	6.9	27.0	73.0
Skåning	6.5	1,939	9.7	27.8	34.5	25.4	2.6	12.3	87.7
Skövde	3.2	946	21.9	53.6	15.4	1.2	7.9	29.8	70.2
Tidaholm	1.4	418	35.2	28.2	17.7	0.2	18.7	53.8	46.2
Vadsbo	21.5	6,424	21.9	23.5	18.4	34.1	2.1	24.0	76.0
Valle	2.0	612	25.3	31.4	21.9	20.4	1.0	26.3	73.7
Vartofta	11.3	3,386	14.6	27.9	14.9	38.0	4.5	19.2	80.8
Vilske	3.3	984	5.6	38.6	13.6	39.8	2.3	7.9	92.1
Viste	4.9	1,457	10.3	52.2	23.3	12.1	2.2	12.5	87.5
Åse	2.6	788	18.5	45.4	27.0	7.5	1.5	20.1	79.9
Total	4.5	29,905	16.8	33.4	22.4	23.8	3.7	20.5	79.5
Source: SCB

=== Stockholm ===
==== Stockholm (city) ====
Location	Share	Votes	S	AV	F	K	Left	Right
Stockholm	100.0	51,440	44.0	37.0	13.7	5.3	49.3	50.7
Total	7.8	51,440	44.0	37.0	13.7	5.3	49.3	50.7
Source: SCB

==== Stockholm County ====
Location	Share	Votes	S	AV	F	B	V	J	Left	Right
Bro-Vätö	2.1	490	26.7	48.8	7.1	10.6	3.9	2.9	30.6	69.4
Danderyd	11.4	2,702	42.6	36.3	15.7	0.0	4.4	0.9	47.0	52.9
Djursholm	2.6	611	27.0	60.4	11.3	0.0	1.1	0.2	28.2	71.8
Färentuna	3.3	777	46.3	13.8	16.3	0.0	2.6	21.0	48.9	51.1
Frösåker	7.0	1,658	36.3	23.3	8.7	27.9	2.7	1.1	39.0	61.0
Frötuna-Länna	2.7	640	22.0	53.8	10.9	1.1	0.0	12.0	22.0	77.8
Lyhundra	2.6	617	20.6	52.4	12.2	4.4	2.1	8.3	22.7	77.1
Långhundra	2.3	548	32.8	25.2	13.1	21.9	1.3	5.7	34.1	65.9
Norrtälje	2.4	568	40.0	48.2	7.6	1.4	2.8	0.0	42.8	57.2
Närdinghundra	4.5	1,058	37.2	20.0	19.0	10.9	3.8	9.1	41.0	59.0
Seminghundra	2.2	513	24.4	21.4	16.0	29.4	1.3	5.8	25.7	74.3
Sigtuna	0.3	64	34.4	39.1	26.6	0.0	0.0	0.0	34.4	65.6
Sjuhundra	2.6	602	46.7	30.7	16.1	2.5	0.7	3.3	47.3	52.7
Sollentuna	8.1	1,912	55.8	18.9	18.8	0.0	4.4	2.0	60.3	39.7
Sotholm	7.3	1,723	44.2	16.5	19.5	0.0	5.0	14.8	49.2	50.8
Svartlösa	9.2	2,182	46.6	33.0	14.3	0.0	4.3	1.8	50.9	49.1
Södertälje	7.2	1,697	50.6	30.3	9.7	0.0	9.3	3.2	59.9	40.1
Vallentuna	2.1	500	41.0	33.6	11.0	1.6	5.4	7.4	46.4	53.6
Vaxholm	1.6	387	11.9	38.8	45.7	0.0	2.8	0.8	14.7	85.3
Väddö-Häverö	4.5	1,073	33.7	41.6	6.1	3.1	6.4	9.1	40.2	59.8
Värmdö	3.9	918	51.1	21.8	15.6	0.0	1.4	10.1	52.5	47.5
Åker	2.5	580	35.2	16.9	26.9	0.0	0.3	20.7	35.5	64.5
Ärlinghundra	2.6	621	38.0	18.7	23.2	13.0	1.3	5.8	39.3	60.7
Öknebo	4.1	957	48.2	22.9	17.5	0.0	8.3	3.2	56.4	43.6
Öregrund	0.4	91	42.9	38.5	17.6	0.0	1.1	0.0	44.0	56.0
Östhammar	0.5	112	19.6	45.5	33.9	0.0	0.9	0.0	20.5	79.5
Total	3.6	23,601	40.9	29.9	15.2	4.6	3.9	5.4	44.8	55.1
Source:SCB

=== Södermanland ===
Location	Share	Votes	S	AV	F	V	J	Left	Right
Daga	4.8	1,079	32.9	15.7	26.0	1.9	23.5	34.8	65.2
Eskilstuna	18.7	4,212	60.5	17.1	17.0	3.4	2.0	63.8	36.2
Hölebo	2.7	604	39.7	17.5	28.5	0.0	14.2	39.7	60.3
Jönåker	8.9	2,007	50.6	13.2	24.3	3.5	8.3	54.1	45.8
Katrineholm	4.9	1,109	46.8	17.7	28.2	7.3	0.0	54.1	45.9
Mariefred	0.7	155	35.5	31.0	29.7	0.0	3.9	35.5	64.5
Nyköping	5.9	1,330	44.4	36.2	15.3	4.1	0.0	48.6	51.4
Oppunda	17.8	4,000	40.9	12.5	36.5	2.4	7.7	43.3	56.7
Rönö	5.6	1,256	31.0	14.3	33.2	0.5	21.0	31.4	68.6
Selebo	3.1	706	42.1	7.2	14.0	4.4	32.3	46.5	53.5
Strängnäs	2.4	537	30.4	50.1	17.1	1.7	0.7	32.0	68.0
Torshälla	1.4	305	54.8	21.6	17.4	1.6	4.6	56.4	43.6
Trosa	0.5	115	33.9	40.9	16.5	0.0	8.7	33.9	66.1
Villåttinge	7.9	1,771	41.0	13.2	30.5	4.3	11.0	45.3	54.7
Västerrekarne	4.7	1,063	27.3	10.4	48.6	0.7	13.0	27.9	72.1
Åker	4.3	972	44.0	9.1	23.7	0.1	23.1	44.1	55.9
Österrekarne	5.7	1,292	30.2	14.2	42.9	0.6	12.1	30.8	69.2
Total	3.4	22,513	43.7	16.5	27.5	2.7	9.5	46.4	53.6
Source: SCB

=== Uppsala ===
Location	Share	Votes	S	AV	F	B	V	J	Left	Right
Bro	2.2	370	63.5	18.4	12.4	0.3	0.0	5.4	63.5	36.5
Bälinge	2.6	446	18.2	10.3	39.5	32.1	0.0	0.0	18.2	81.8
Enköping	3.8	641	38.7	39.3	15.8	0.0	6.2	0.0	44.9	55.1
Hagunda	3.7	617	26.9	20.6	37.1	13.0	0.3	2.1	27.2	72.8
Håbo	3.3	549	49.5	20.4	15.8	1.1	0.7	12.4	50.3	49.7
Lagunda	3.1	521	31.9	24.4	21.1	10.6	0.8	11.3	32.6	67.4
Norunda	4.9	830	23.6	9.3	40.7	22.9	3.3	0.2	26.9	73.1
Oland	17.6	2,971	32.2	9.6	35.9	13.8	7.4	1.1	39.6	60.4
Rasbo	2.4	407	26.8	22.9	31.7	11.3	0.2	7.1	27.0	73.0
Trögd	6.5	1,094	34.1	29.1	10.7	17.2	0.5	8.5	34.6	65.4
Ulleråker	3.8	636	35.4	12.9	29.2	18.2	3.1	1.1	38.5	61.5
Uppsala	19.4	3,276	32.7	37.8	24.4	0.4	4.7	0.0	37.4	62.6
Vaksala	2.3	394	24.6	22.6	21.8	26.6	3.6	0.8	28.2	71.8
Åsunda	3.7	623	27.1	29.5	14.0	18.3	2.9	8.2	30.0	70.0
Örbyhus	20.8	3,511	39.2	6.9	21.2	12.7	19.7	0.2	59.0	41.0
Total	2.6	16,886	34.0	19.8	25.5	11.3	7.1	2.3	41.1	58.9
Source: SCB

=== Värmland ===
Location	Share	Votes	S	AV	F	B	V	J	Left	Right
Arvika	1.9	596	32.6	31.5	29.2	0.0	6.0	0.7	38.6	61.4
Filipstad	1.8	550	24.2	37.6	28.7	0.9	8.4	0.0	32.5	67.3
Fryksdal	13.2	4,049	18.0	21.0	37.3	10.4	8.7	4.6	26.7	73.3
Färnebo	7.2	2,216	48.4	8.5	22.6	2.6	17.8	0.1	66.2	33.8
Gillberg	4.9	1,519	18.4	22.7	39.3	3.2	5.8	10.6	24.2	75.8
Grums	4.0	1,230	42.5	12.8	26.7	1.1	12.2	4.6	54.7	45.3
Jösse	9.7	2,975	25.1	23.4	34.9	0.5	5.0	11.0	30.2	69.8
Karlstad	6.3	1,932	36.2	26.7	31.7	0.4	4.9	0.2	41.1	58.9
Karlstad hundred	4.6	1,421	45.0	9.6	27.6	4.8	13.0	0.0	58.0	42.0
Kil	8.8	2,693	35.6	8.5	28.6	7.9	16.7	2.7	52.3	47.7
Kristinehamn	3.8	1,166	37.1	29.1	28.6	0.2	5.1	0.0	42.2	57.8
Nordmark	8.2	2,502	14.8	28.3	48.8	4.2	2.8	1.1	17.6	82.4
Nyed	2.6	805	25.6	19.6	36.5	3.6	14.7	0.0	40.2	59.8
Näs	4.8	1,469	15.4	19.1	32.6	9.3	2.7	20.9	18.1	81.9
Visnum	3.5	1,062	22.2	19.9	31.5	15.0	10.9	0.6	33.1	66.9
Väse	3.3	1,027	26.2	19.0	46.9	7.9	0.0	0.0	26.2	73.8
Älvdal	9.9	3,039	31.1	10.8	22.5	3.1	30.9	1.6	61.9	38.1
Ölme	1.5	448	26.3	42.0	27.9	0.0	0.4	3.3	26.8	73.2
Total	4.7	30,699	28.6	19.3	32.7	4.7	10.7	4.0	39.3	60.7
Source: SCB

=== Västerbotten ===
Location	Share	Votes	S	AV	F	V	J	Left	Right
Burträsk	6.9	1,417	0.0	50.1	48.6	0.0	1.3	0.0	100.0
Degerfors	5.0	1,028	6.9	19.2	63.0	3.3	7.6	10.2	89.8
Lycksele	7.6	1,564	2.6	23.2	60.7	4.2	9.4	6.7	93.3
Nordmaling-Bjurholm	9.7	1,988	5.6	22.1	50.5	5.6	16.1	11.3	88.7
Norsjö-Malå	4.3	887	0.0	33.9	63.5	0.0	2.5	0.0	99.9
Nysätra	10.5	2,161	0.0	41.8	56.2	0.0	2.0	0.0	100.0
Skellefteå	1.7	341	0.0	59.5	38.7	0.0	1.8	0.0	100.0
Skellefteå ting	27.6	5,675	0.0	47.0	40.9	0.0	12.0	0.0	100.0
Umeå	3.3	682	3.4	54.0	33.0	8.5	1.2	11.9	88.1
Umeå ting	16.2	3,332	8.4	13.7	50.6	8.3	19.0	16.7	83.3
Åsele	7.1	1,458	0.7	24.6	58.4	12.3	4.0	13.0	87.0
Total	3.1	20,533	2.6	33.8	51.5	3.5	8.5	6.2	93.8
Source: SCB

=== Västernorrland ===
Location	Share	Votes	S	AV	F	B	V	J	Left	Right
Boteå	6.4	1,721	0.2	12.0	13.7	22.1	51.9	0.0	52.2	47.8
Fjällsjö	4.7	1,273	2.0	19.2	15.1	15.3	48.4	0.0	50.4	49.6
Härnösand	2.5	666	8.1	52.0	30.5	3.2	6.3	0.0	14.4	85.6
Indal	3.3	884	31.7	12.0	32.0	21.0	3.3	0.0	35.0	65.0
Ljustorp	3.1	830	33.0	8.7	33.6	16.3	8.4	0.0	41.4	58.6
Medelpad Västra	12.9	3,448	27.1	7.7	30.6	28.2	6.3	0.0	33.5	66.5
Njurunda	3.1	826	49.3	8.7	20.7	14.2	7.1	0.0	56.4	43.6
Nordingrå	3.4	921	0.9	19.0	38.2	0.0	11.2	30.6	12.1	87.8
Nätra	8.8	2,372	4.3	20.2	45.4	0.0	15.7	14.3	20.1	79.9
Ramsele-Resele	5.7	1,528	0.9	16.9	14.4	34.2	33.6	0.0	34.5	65.5
Själevad-Arnäs	11.8	3,168	2.9	23.4	44.2	0.0	17.7	11.7	20.7	79.3
Skön	9.7	2,613	57.8	7.8	17.0	8.2	9.2	0.0	67.0	33.0
Sollefteå	1.2	311	4.2	44.7	32.8	1.9	16.4	0.0	20.6	79.4
Sollefteå ting	4.0	1,073	5.5	19.2	7.5	26.6	41.2	0.0	46.7	53.2
Sundsvall	4.0	1,068	20.1	57.4	19.9	1.2	1.3	0.0	21.4	78.6
Ångermanland Södra N	4.3	1,152	1.0	8.2	31.1	27.4	32.3	0.0	33.2	66.8
Ångermanland Södra S	9.5	2,553	4.1	9.4	22.4	18.7	45.5	0.0	49.5	50.5
Örnsköldsvik	1.5	410	0.2	50.0	31.2	0.0	18.0	0.5	18.3	81.7
Total	4.1	26,817	15.3	17.4	27.5	13.1	21.8	4.9	37.1	62.9
Source: SCB

=== Västmanland ===
Location	Share	Votes	S	AV	F	B	V	Left	Right
Arboga	2.6	463	45.4	22.5	23.5	0.2	8.4	53.8	46.2
Gamla Norberg	10.2	1,840	51.0	7.6	16.7	9.3	15.4	66.4	33.6
Köping	3.8	676	27.4	32.7	19.1	11.2	9.6	37.0	63.0
Norrbo	4.4	791	48.0	3.0	17.1	27.3	4.6	52.6	47.4
Sala	3.9	698	31.2	22.3	27.2	15.3	3.6	34.8	64.9
Siende	3.0	544	31.3	7.7	23.9	22.6	14.5	45.8	54.2
Simtuna	6.4	1,155	23.5	15.8	26.8	29.4	4.4	27.9	72.1
Skinnskatteberg	4.9	876	33.6	9.0	15.4	11.5	30.5	64.0	36.0
Snevringe	11.8	2,119	44.7	7.4	19.7	16.8	11.4	56.2	43.8
Torstuna	3.2	580	17.9	18.6	18.6	33.6	11.2	29.1	70.9
Tuhundra	1.5	275	16.7	5.8	38.2	31.6	7.6	24.4	75.6
Vagnsbro	2.7	489	20.4	3.1	29.2	42.9	4.3	24.7	75.3
Våla	6.2	1,112	19.3	10.7	40.6	25.0	4.5	23.7	76.3
Västerås	17.9	3,221	48.5	24.0	15.6	1.6	10.3	58.8	41.2
Yttertjurbo	1.7	312	20.2	6.4	25.6	42.6	5.1	25.3	74.7
Åkerbo	11.2	2,015	32.4	14.1	27.0	14.6	12.0	44.3	55.7
Övertjurbo	4.7	855	20.4	3.5	17.2	54.5	4.4	24.8	75.2
Total	2.7	18,021	36.2	13.7	21.9	17.8	10.4	46.6	53.4
Source: SCB

=== Älvsborg ===
Location	Share	Votes	S	AV	F	B	V	Left	Right
Ale	4.9	1,729	26.9	14.9	17.3	39.2	1.8	28.7	71.3
Alingsås	1.6	553	24.8	39.6	30.6	0.4	4.7	29.5	70.5
Bjärke	1.9	663	9.7	30.5	50.8	8.4	0.6	10.3	89.7
Bollebygd	2.3	800	10.4	71.6	9.0	8.6	0.4	10.8	89.3
Borås	7.2	2,557	36.5	47.6	14.7	0.2	1.0	37.5	62.5
Flundre	2.2	768	57.7	8.5	7.0	26.3	0.5	58.2	41.8
Gäsene	4.9	1,731	5.1	47.9	22.1	24.1	0.6	5.8	94.2
Kind	12.9	4,563	11.5	42.3	21.7	24.3	0.2	11.7	88.3
Kulling	6.3	2,236	9.8	36.1	39.6	13.0	1.5	11.3	88.7
Mark	11.3	4,014	17.3	51.7	8.7	19.0	3.2	20.6	79.4
Nordal	2.9	1,022	24.4	13.0	24.8	36.6	1.3	25.6	74.4
Redväg	4.6	1,634	6.4	41.2	14.6	37.8	0.1	6.5	93.5
Sundal	3.6	1,275	5.0	35.1	10.2	49.6	0.0	5.0	95.0
Trollhättan	3.3	1,164	70.8	14.6	12.7	0.7	1.2	72.0	28.0
Tössbo	2.2	790	17.6	46.5	26.7	9.1	0.1	17.7	82.3
Ulricehamn	0.9	320	20.3	50.3	26.3	1.3	1.9	22.2	77.8
Valbo	3.7	1,294	18.6	27.9	16.8	32.9	3.7	22.3	77.6
Vedbo	6.8	2,393	33.7	11.6	29.9	22.7	2.0	35.7	64.2
Veden	2.7	965	7.0	58.5	14.6	19.6	0.2	7.3	92.7
Väne	2.5	900	27.8	22.2	19.4	28.2	2.3	30.1	69.9
Vänersborg	1.9	684	29.7	46.1	17.4	0.1	6.6	36.3	63.6
Vättle	2.9	1,012	38.4	28.1	24.9	7.7	0.9	39.3	60.7
Åmål	2.1	750	43.1	34.4	18.9	0.0	3.6	46.7	53.3
Ås	4.6	1,621	2.2	53.1	7.2	34.0	3.6	5.7	94.3
Total	5.4	35,438	20.9	37.4	19.4	20.7	1.6	22.5	77.4
Source: SCB

=== Örebro ===
Location	Share	Votes	S	AV	F	B	V	B/J	Left	Right
Asker	5.3	1,218	27.8	14.5	50.1	0.0	0.2	7.4	28.0	72.0
Askersund	0.9	216	24.5	49.5	19.9	0.0	0.0	6.0	24.5	75.5
Edsberg	6.9	1,609	26.2	14.5	36.9	0.0	7.0	15.2	33.3	66.7
Fellingsbro	4.8	1,124	31.6	15.6	19.0	31.6	2.2	0.0	33.8	66.2
Glanshammar	3.3	770	20.1	18.1	43.8	17.7	0.4	0.0	20.5	79.5
Grimsten	4.1	954	40.9	15.2	27.1	0.0	9.0	7.8	49.9	50.1
Grythytte-Hällefors	3.4	791	46.0	7.3	8.0	9.0	29.7	0.0	75.7	24.3
Hardemo	1.4	318	13.5	20.8	33.6	0.0	3.8	28.3	17.3	82.7
Karlskoga hundred	8.0	1,858	51.0	13.8	15.7	0.0	6.3	13.2	57.3	42.7
Kumla hundred	10.3	2,385	27.8	28.1	33.8	0.0	3.6	6.7	31.4	68.6
Lindes-Ramsberg	5.7	1,329	33.6	8.1	18.8	35.9	3.6	0.0	37.2	62.8
Lindesberg	1.4	319	34.8	40.8	19.4	4.4	0.6	0.0	35.4	64.6
Nora	1.3	302	19.5	40.7	23.8	0.3	15.6	0.0	35.1	64.9
Nora-Hjulsjö	4.4	1,017	40.7	10.6	20.0	21.9	6.8	0.0	47.5	52.5
Nya Kopparberg	4.5	1,042	60.2	14.4	15.7	4.8	4.9	0.0	65.1	34.9
Sköllersta	5.5	1,276	20.8	19.5	50.2	0.0	2.3	7.2	23.0	76.9
Sundbo	4.9	1,137	47.2	14.9	15.9	0.0	0.4	21.5	47.7	52.3
Örebro	15.0	3,480	44.2	23.2	29.2	0.1	3.3	0.0	47.4	52.5
Örebro hundred	8.8	2,052	38.4	20.5	32.4	7.2	1.5	0.0	39.9	60.1
Total	3.5	23,197	36.7	18.5	28.4	6.4	4.6	5.4	41.3	58.6
Source: SCB

=== Östergötland ===
Location	Share	Votes	S	AV	F	V	J	Left	Right
Aska	5.3	1,811	47.5	19.9	10.2	5.4	17.0	53.0	47.0
Bankekind	4.6	1,571	45.7	12.5	15.7	6.3	19.8	52.0	48.0
Björkekind	1.6	563	22.7	14.0	14.0	0.2	49.0	22.9	77.1
Boberg	3.1	1,059	34.7	19.8	11.9	5.9	27.7	40.6	59.4
Borg	1.0	354	42.9	34.5	20.6	2.0	0.0	44.9	55.1
Bråbo	1.6	554	59.4	20.8	5.1	9.4	5.4	68.8	31.2
Dal	1.4	478	39.5	24.9	11.5	3.8	20.3	43.3	56.7
Finspånga län	10.3	3,540	42.7	13.7	15.2	6.7	21.8	49.4	50.6
Gullberg	2.2	741	27.8	15.7	17.4	13.2	25.9	41.0	59.0
Göstring	6.0	2,058	34.3	20.7	14.7	9.7	20.6	44.0	56.0
Hammarkind	5.6	1,905	25.0	24.7	27.8	3.3	19.2	28.3	71.7
Hanekind	2.7	925	32.4	17.6	19.2	3.4	27.4	35.8	64.2
Kinda	6.6	2,252	27.3	28.1	20.0	2.7	21.9	30.0	70.0
Linköping	7.3	2,512	31.2	47.6	18.8	2.3	0.0	33.6	66.4
Lysing	3.8	1,291	24.9	26.9	15.3	2.8	30.1	27.7	72.3
Lösing	1.7	585	44.3	20.5	10.9	1.7	22.6	46.0	54.0
Memming	2.0	685	53.0	18.7	12.4	11.2	4.7	64.2	35.8
Mjölby	2.0	688	40.4	29.9	20.8	4.7	4.2	45.1	54.9
Motala	1.8	602	33.6	47.0	15.1	3.7	0.7	37.2	62.8
Norrköping	13.8	4,726	40.9	35.7	22.1	1.3	0.0	42.2	57.8
Skänninge	0.6	211	27.5	42.2	22.7	6.6	0.9	34.1	65.9
Skärkind	1.9	650	38.9	18.8	19.4	2.5	20.5	41.4	58.6
Söderköping	0.7	238	25.2	50.0	21.8	2.9	0.0	28.2	71.8
Vadstena	1.0	330	40.0	39.7	19.1	0.0	0.9	40.0	59.7
Valkebo	2.8	950	33.2	24.4	21.6	1.3	19.6	34.4	65.6
Vifolka	2.9	989	27.9	25.0	18.0	7.9	21.1	35.8	64.1
Ydre	2.8	960	24.0	15.1	18.6	3.3	38.9	27.3	72.6
Åkerbo	1.2	425	8.5	36.0	22.8	1.6	30.8	10.1	89.6
Östkind	1.9	649	19.6	16.2	20.0	0.9	43.3	20.5	79.5
Total	5.2	34,302	35.5	25.7	17.8	4.4	16.7	39.9	60.1
Source: SCB
