= 1914 Swedish general election =

1914 Swedish general election can refer to:

- March 1914 Swedish general election
- September 1914 Swedish general election
