= Alex Lindman =

Swedish sports journalist (1862-1939)

Edvard Alexander Lindman
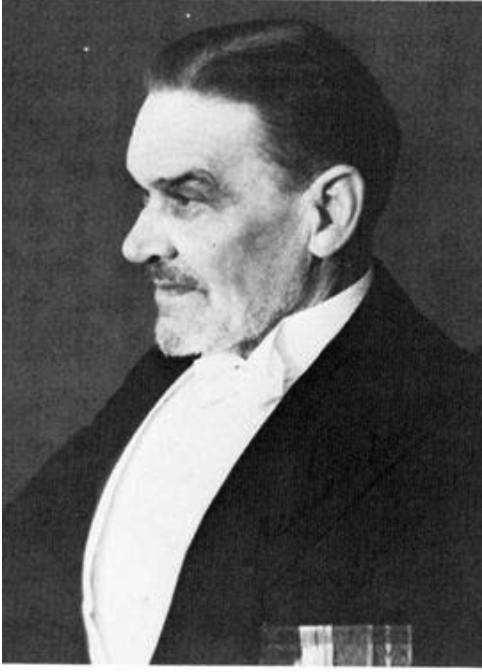
- Born: 1862
- Died: 1939
- Citizenship: Swedish
- Occupation: Sports journalist

Edvard Alexander "Alex" Lindman, was born on June 4, 1862 in Stockholm. He died February 28, 1939. He was a Swedish coach and sports journalist. He was the cousin of Swedish prime minister Arvid Lindman . Alex Lindman was one of the initiators of Stockholm's Skridskoseglarklubb.
