= 1905 Swedish general election =

- September 1905

All 230 seats in the Andra kammaren
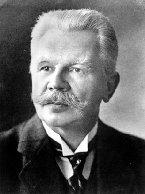

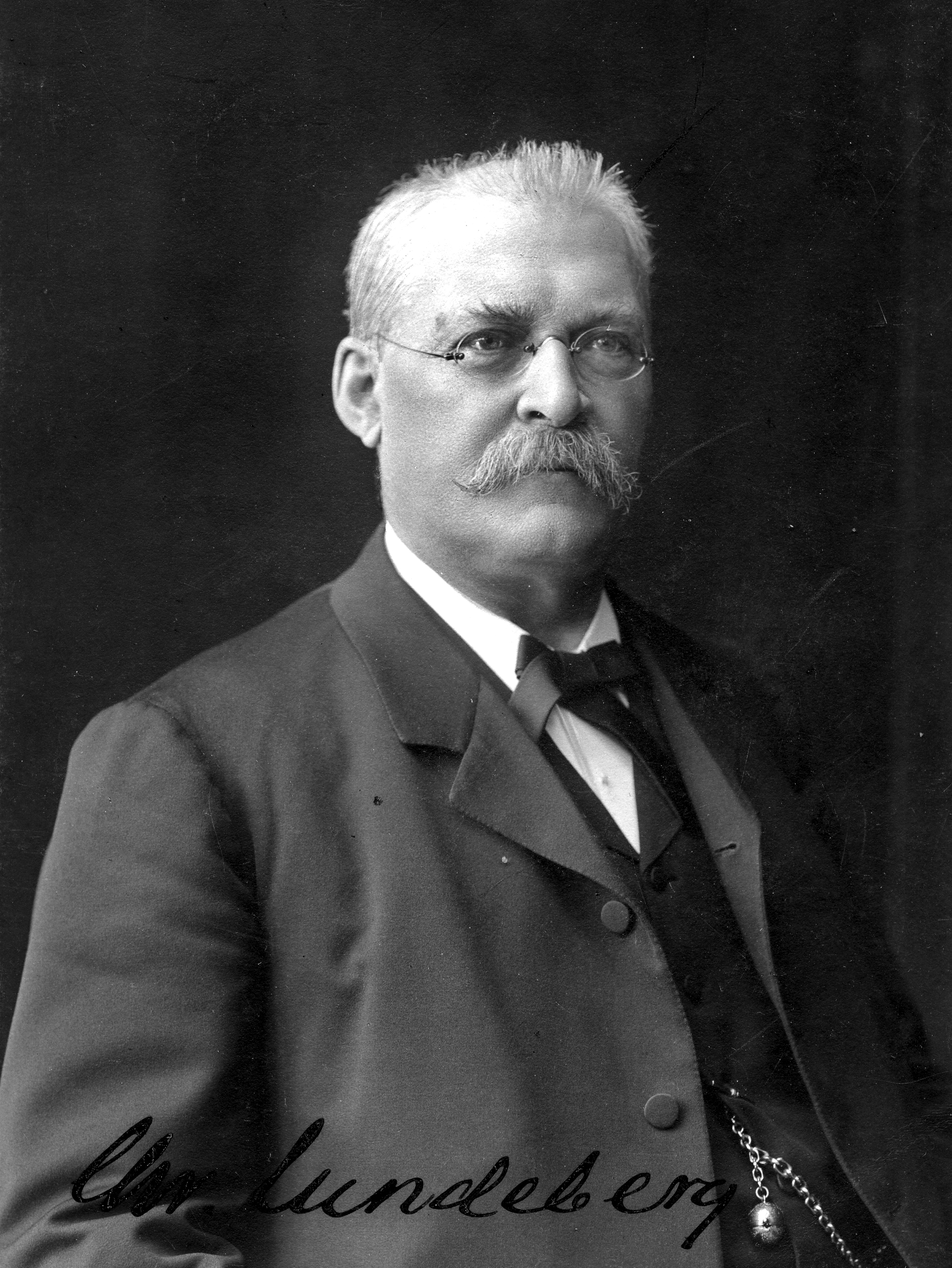

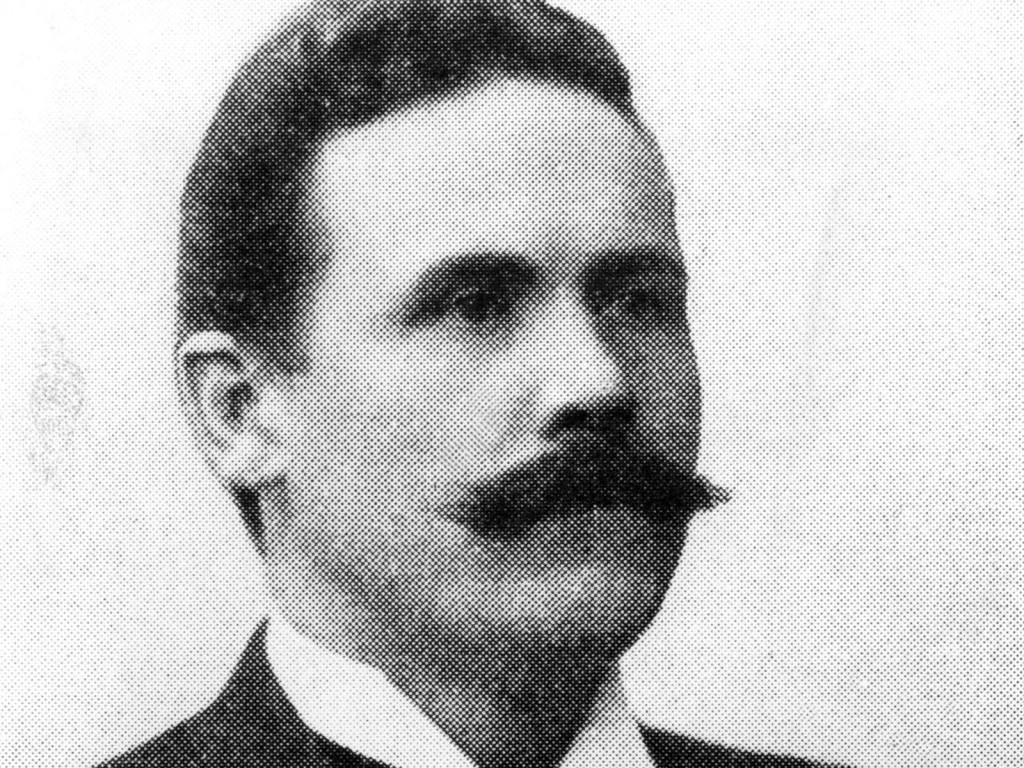
	First party	Second party	Third party
Leader	Karl Staaff	Christian Lundeberg	Claes Tholin
Party	Free-minded	Electoral League	Social Democrats
Seats won	109	108	13
Popular vote	98,287	98,359	20,677
Percentage	45.23%	45.26%	9.51%
PM before election
Christian Lundeberg
Electoral League
PM-elect
Karl Staaff
Free-minded

General elections were held in Sweden in September 1905.

The General Electoral League received the most votes but won one less seat than the Free-minded National Association. This incongruency helped lay the base for a switch to proportional representation in 1907.

== Results ==
Only 31% of the male population aged over 21 was eligible to vote. Voter turnout was 50.4%, the first time it had ever been higher than 50%.

Party	Votes	%	Seats	+/–
General Electoral League	98,359	45.26	108	–11
Free-minded National Association	98,287	45.23	109	+2
Swedish Social Democratic Party	20,677	9.51	13	+9
Total	217,323	100.00	230	0
Registered voters/turnout	432,099	–		
Source: Mackie & Rose
