= 1911 Swedish general election =

- 10 September 1911

All 230 seats in the Andra kammaren
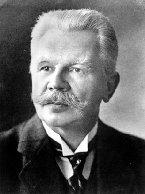

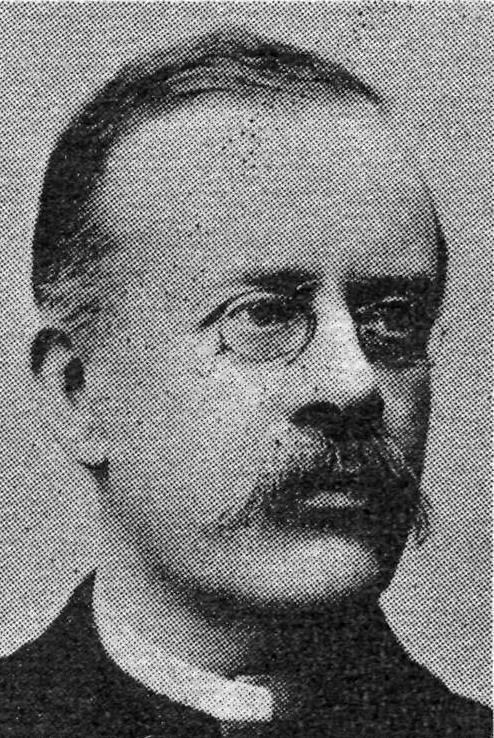

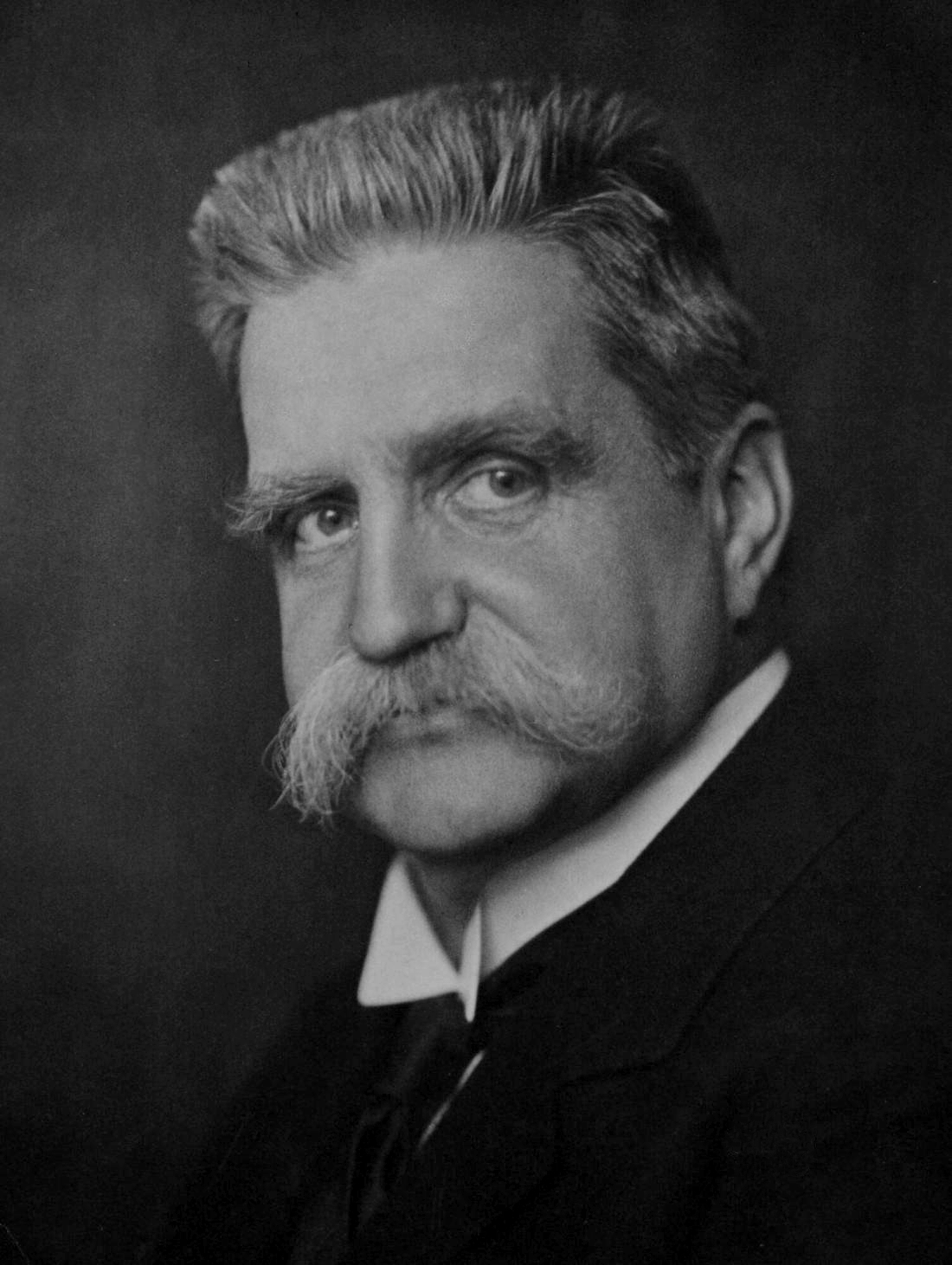
	First party	Second party	Third party
Leader	Karl Staaff	Gustaf Fredrik Östberg	Hjalmar Branting
Party	Free-minded	Electoral League	Social Democrats
Seats won	102	64	64
Popular vote	242,795	188,691	172,196
Percentage	40.20%	31.24%	28.51%
PM before election
Arvid Lindman
Electoral League
PM-elect
Karl Staaff
Free-minded

General elections were held in Sweden between 3 and 24 September 1911, the first election in Sweden with universal male suffrage. The Free-minded National Association (FL) emerged as the largest party, winning 102 of the 230 seats in the Andra kammaren of the Riksdag.

As a result of the election, the General Electoral League's Arvid Lindman resigned as Prime Minister and was replaced by FL leader Karl Staaff.

== Results ==
Party	Votes	%	Seats	+/–
Free-minded National Association	242,795	40.20	102	–3
General Electoral League	188,691	31.24	64	–27
Swedish Social Democratic Party	172,196	28.51	64	+30
Other parties	292	0.05	0	New
Total	603,974	100.00	230	0
Valid votes	603,974	99.42		
Invalid/blank votes	3,506	0.58		
Total votes	607,480	100.00		
Registered voters/turnout	1,066,200	56.98		
Source: Nohlen & Stöver
