= March 1914 Swedish general election =

- 27 March 1914

All 230 seats in the Andra kammaren
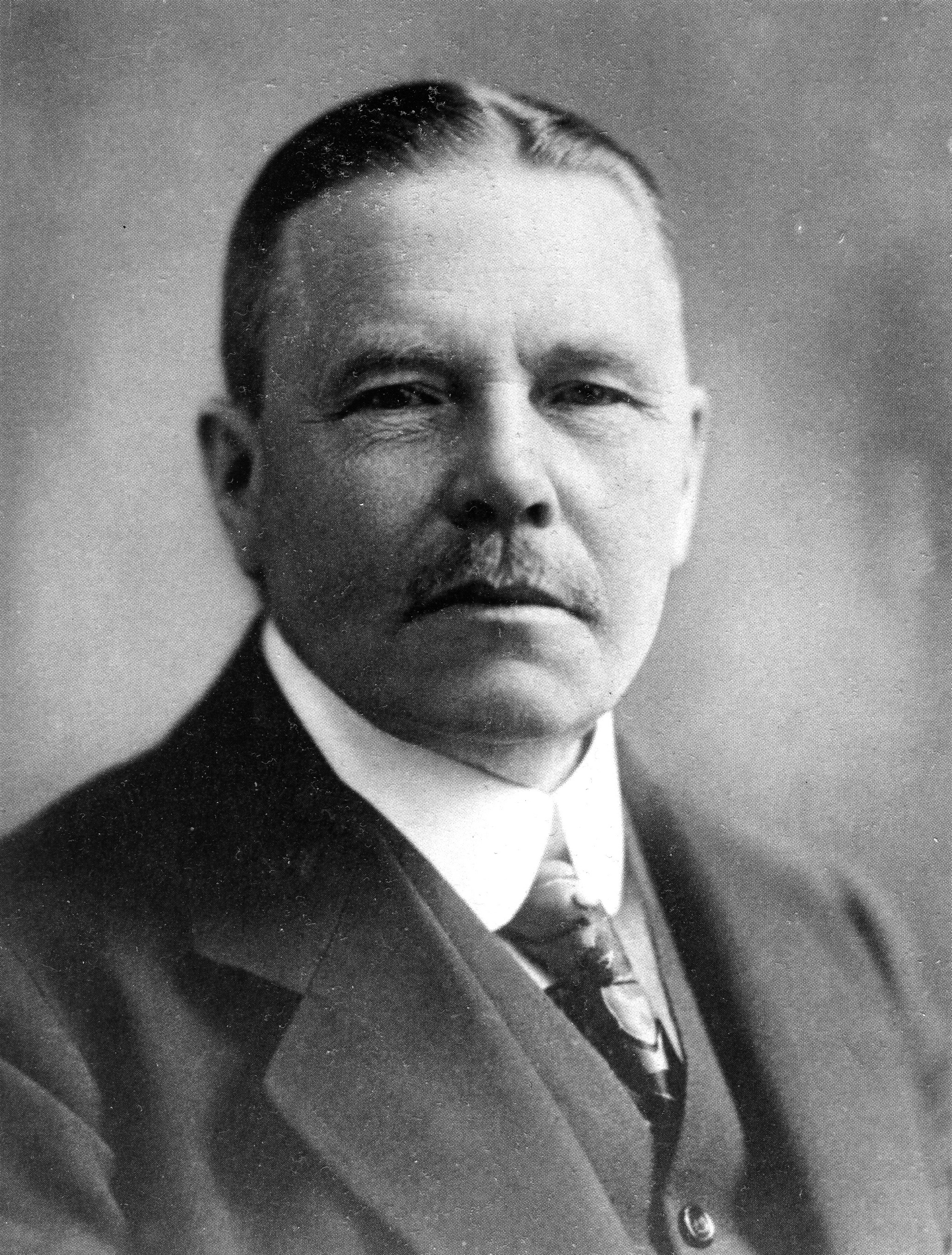

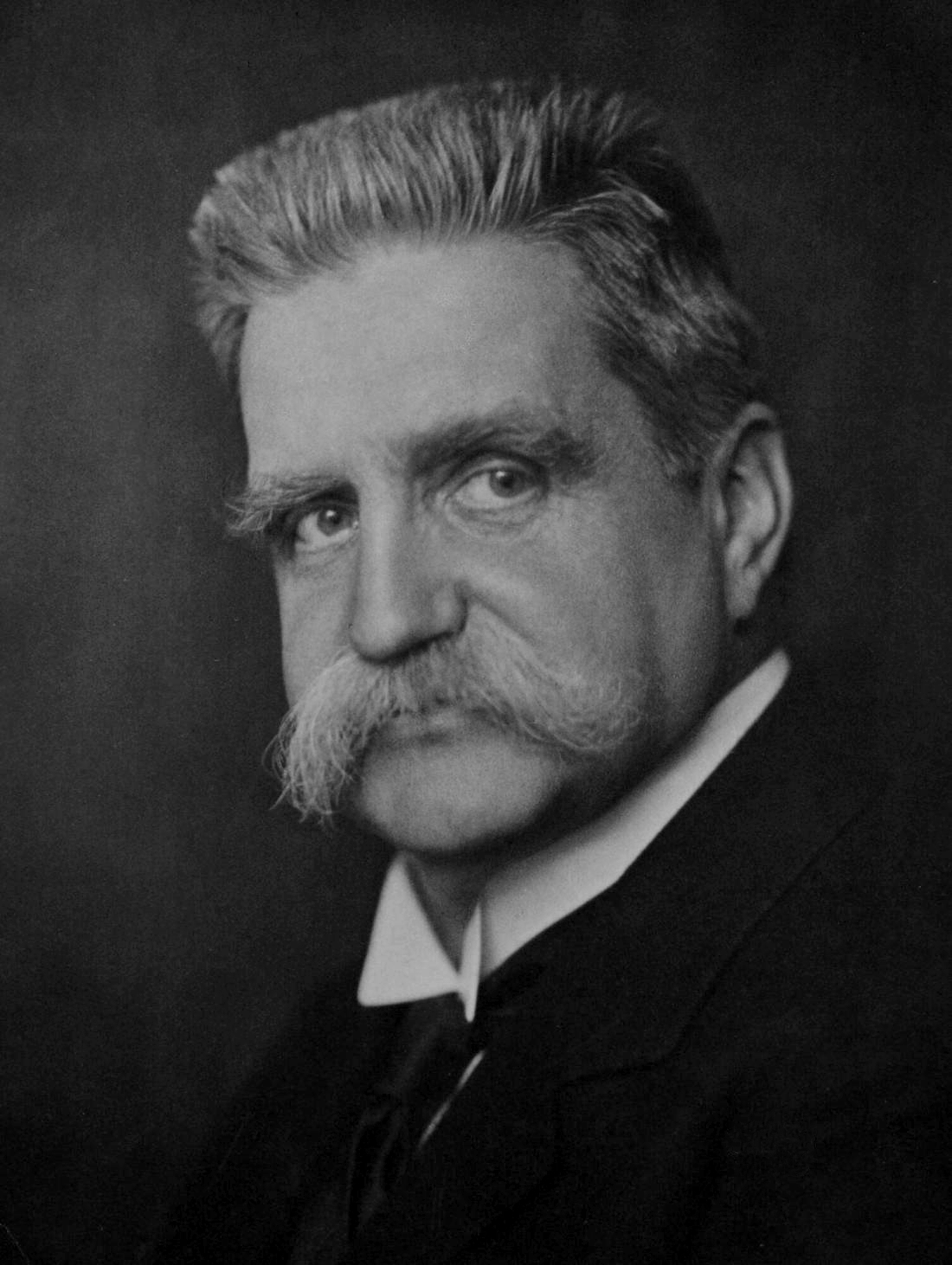

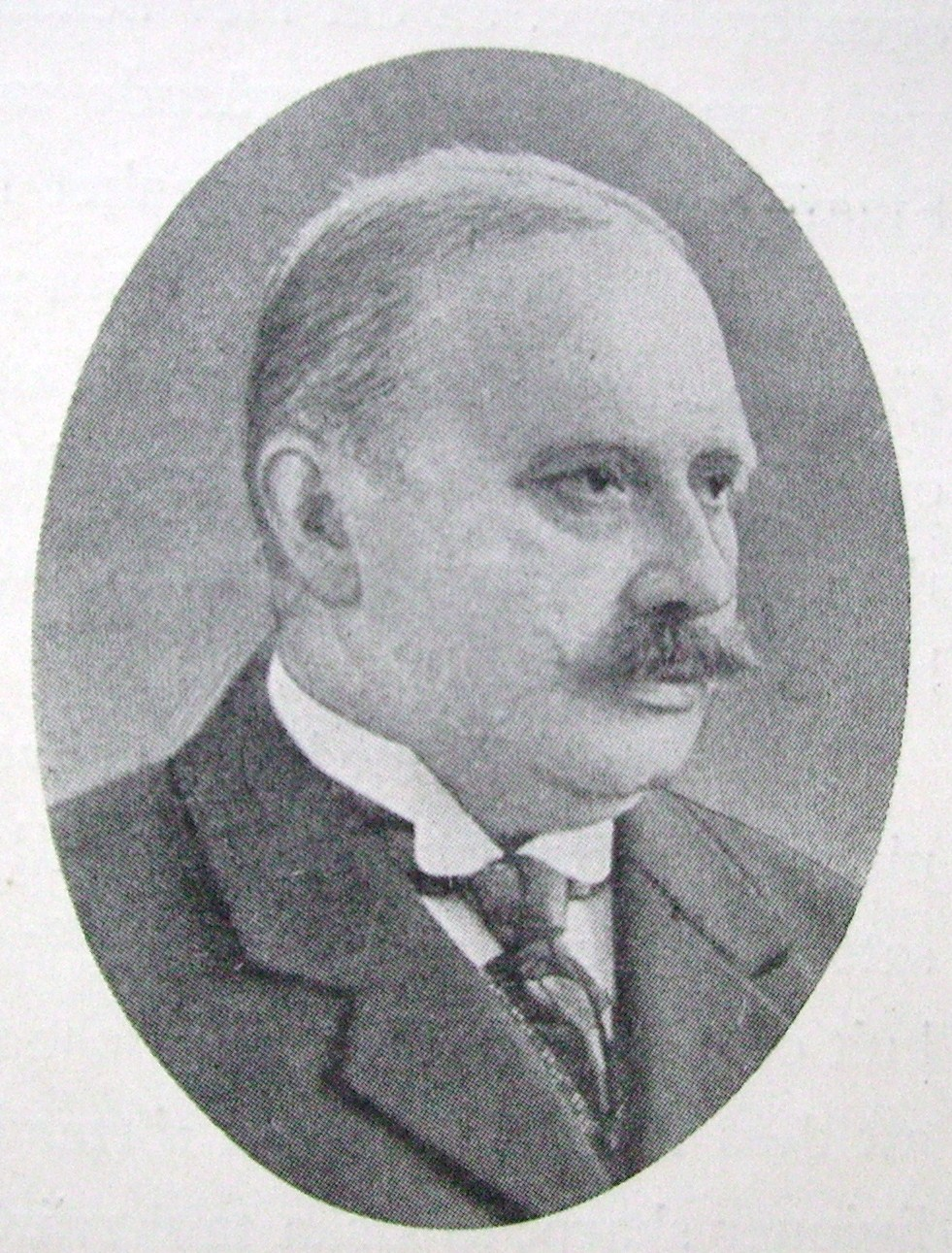
	First party	Second party	Third party
Leader	Arvid Lindman	Hjalmar Branting	Axel Schotte
Party	Electoral League	Social Democrats	Free-minded
Last election	64	64	102
Seats won	86	73	71
Seat change	▲22	▲9	▼31
Popular vote	286,250	228,712	245,107
Percentage	37.65%	30.09%	32.24%
Prime Minister before election
Karl Staaff
Free-minded
PM-elect
Hjalmar Hammarskjöld
Electoral League

Early general elections were held in Sweden between 27 March and 7 April 1914, after the Riksdag had been prematurely dissolved by the Cabinet of Hjalmar Hammarskjöld. The General Electoral League emerged as the largest party, winning 86 of the 230 seats in the Andra kammaren. As of 2026, this is the last time a Swedish election has not seen the Social Democrats win a plurality of seats.

== Results ==
Party	Votes	%	Seats	+/–
General Electoral League	286,250	37.65	86	+22
Free-minded National Association	245,107	32.24	71	–31
Swedish Social Democratic Party	228,712	30.09	73	+9
Other parties	125	0.02	0	0
Total	760,194	100.00	230	0
Valid votes	760,194	99.58		
Invalid/blank votes	3,229	0.42		
Total votes	763,423	100.00		
Registered voters/turnout	1,092,454	69.88		
Source: Nohlen & Stöver
