= 1928 Swedish general election =

← 1924	15 September 1928	1932 →

All 230 seats in the Andra kammaren of the Riksdag
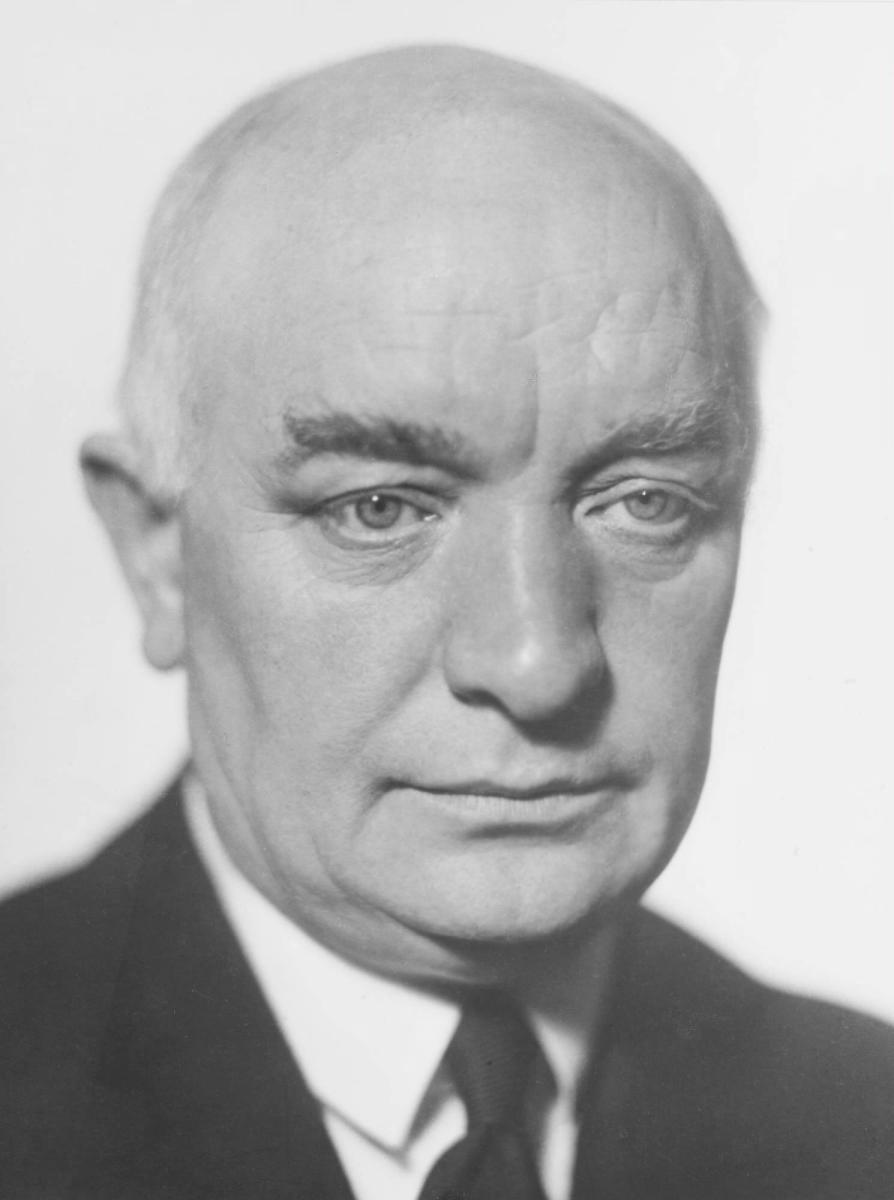

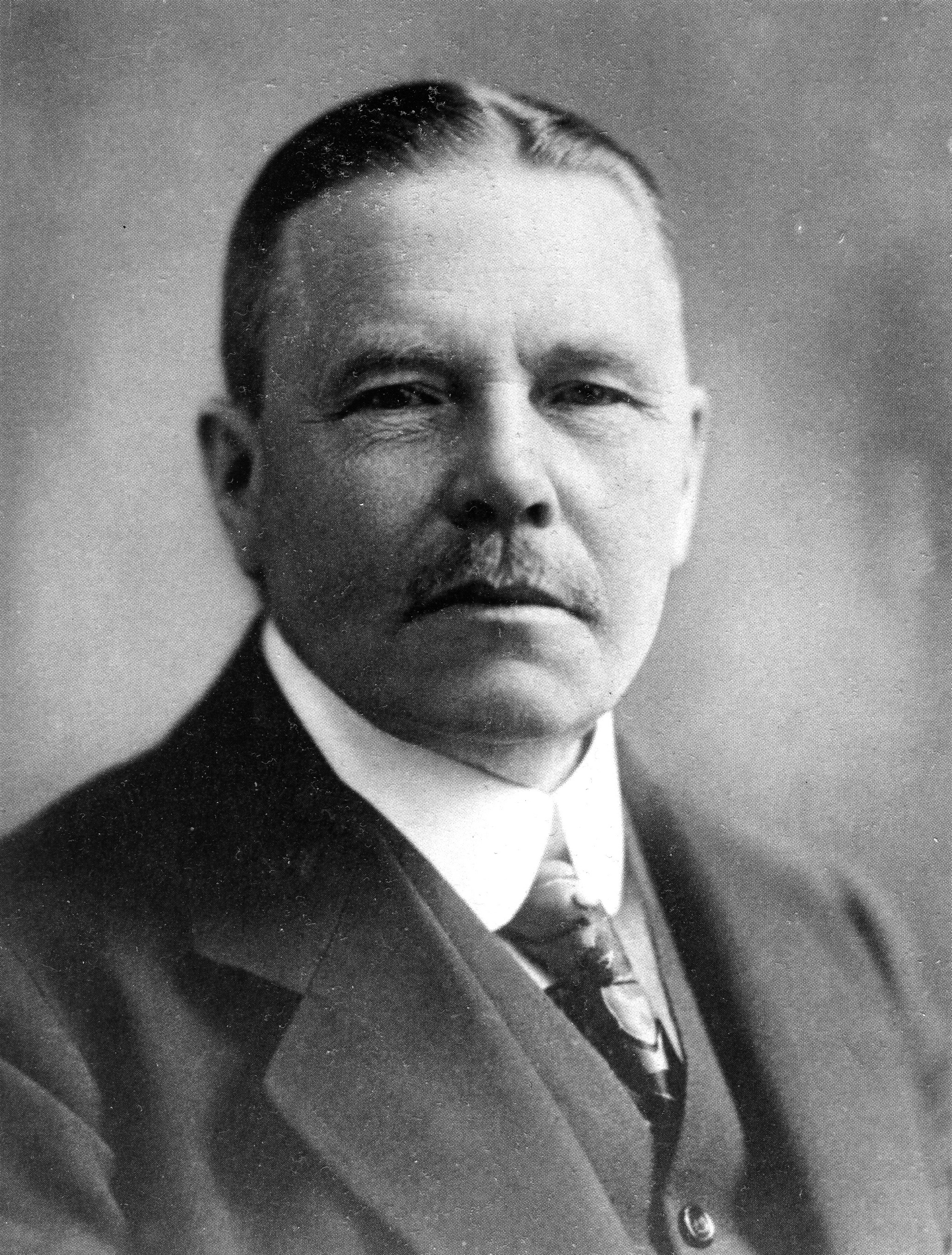

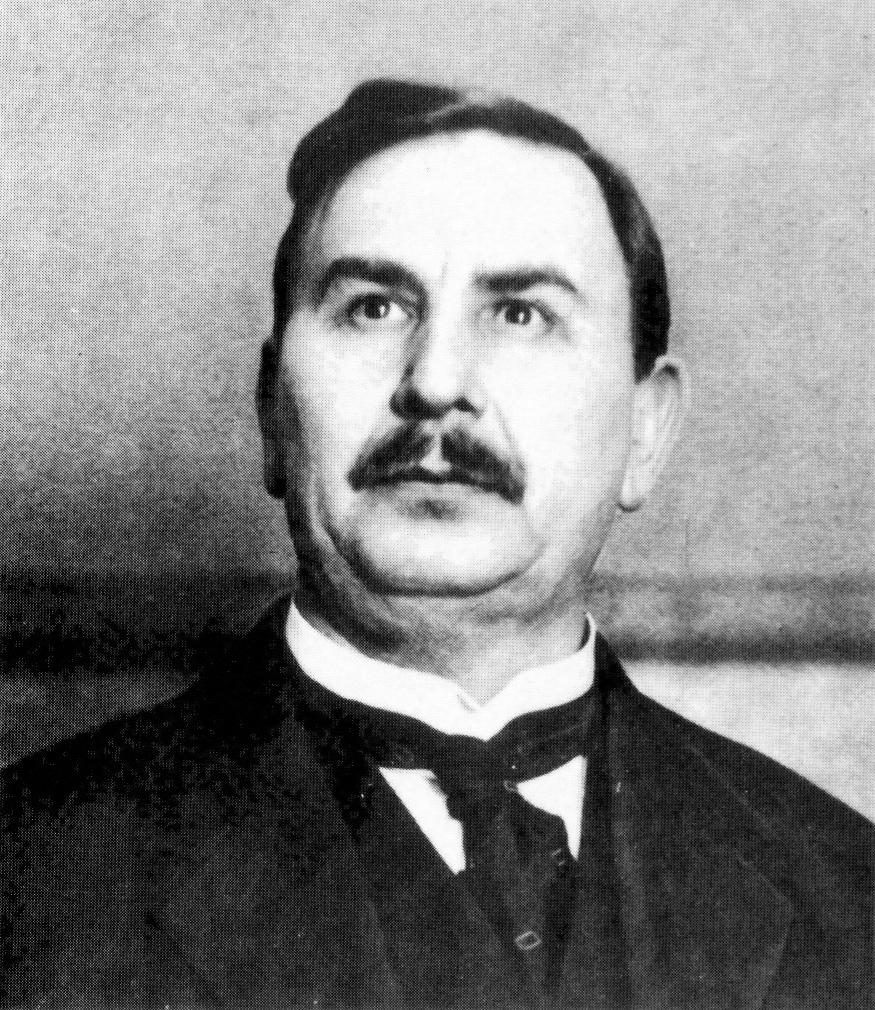

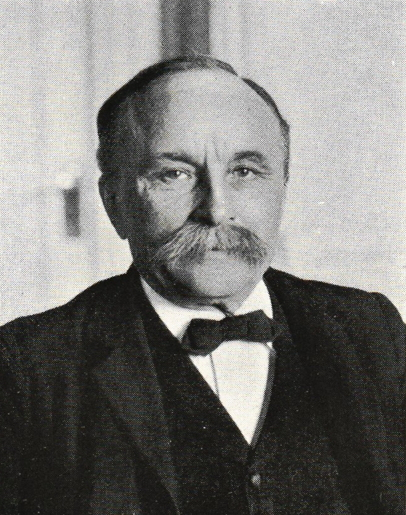

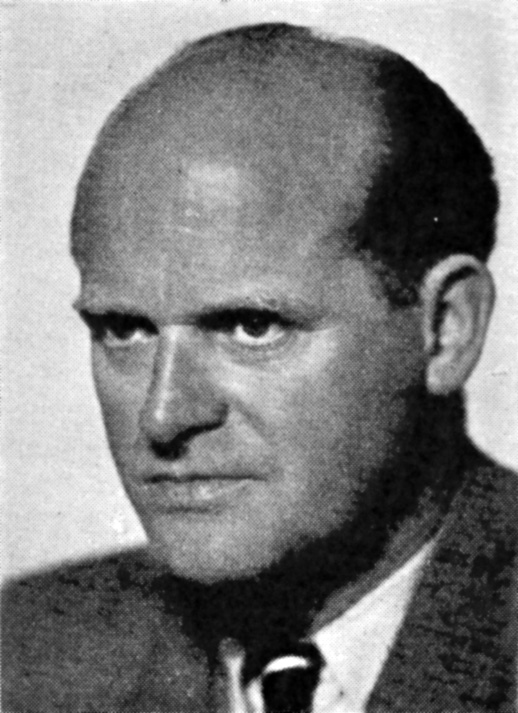

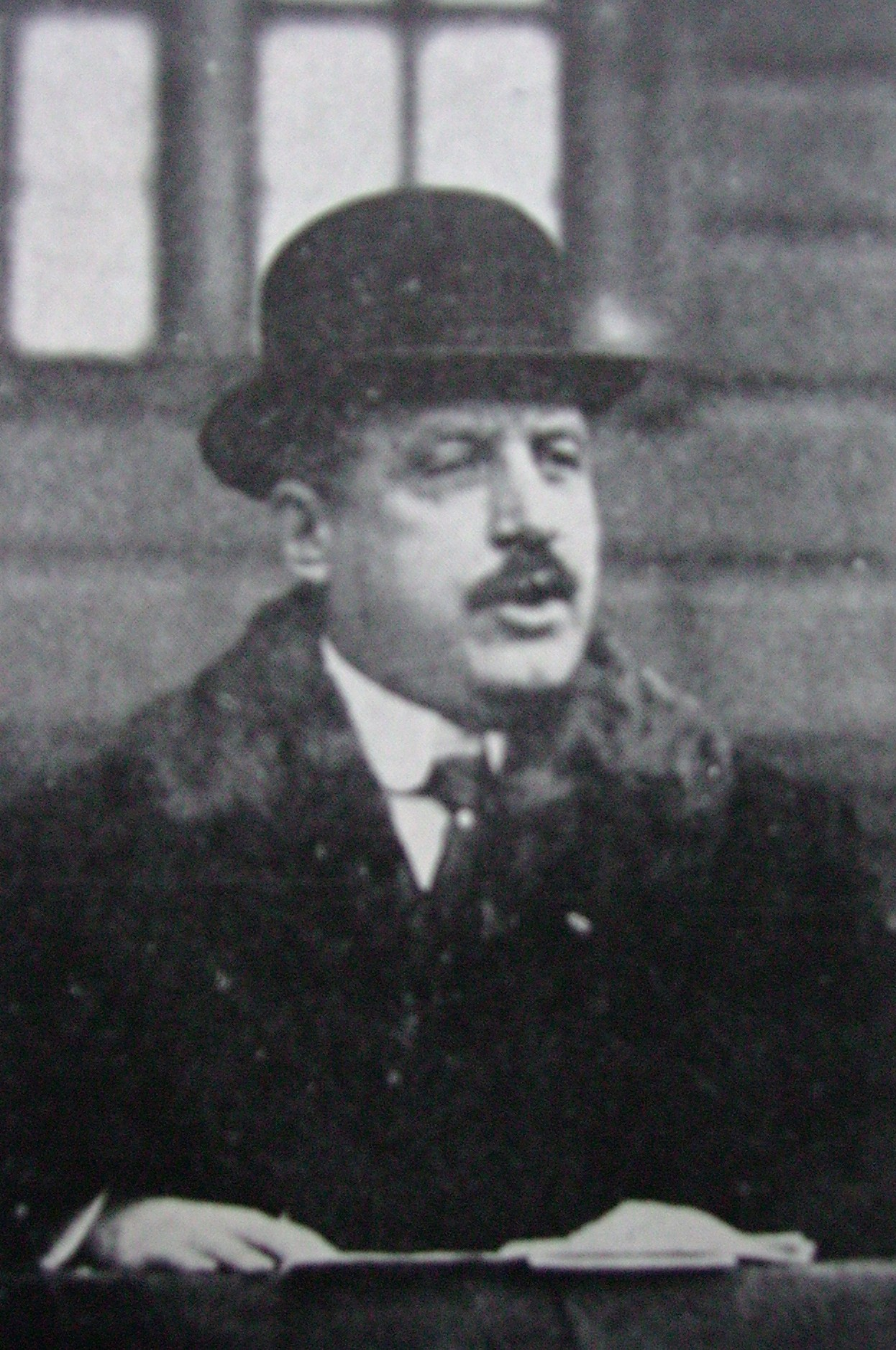
	First party	Second party	Third party
Leader	Per Albin Hansson	Arvid Lindman	Carl Gustaf Ekman
Party	Social Democrats	Electoral League	Free-minded
Last election	104	65	29
Seats won	90	73	28
Seat change	▼14	▲8	▼1
Popular vote	873,931	692,434	303,995
Percentage	37.05%	29.36%	12.89%
	Fourth party	Fifth party	Sixth party
Leader	Olof Olsson	Nils Flyg	Eliel Löfgren
Party	Farmers' League	Communist	Liberals
Last election	23	4	4
Seats won	27	8	4
Seat change	▲4	▲4	Steady
Popular vote	263,501	151,567	70,820
Percentage	11.17%	6.43%	3.00%
- Largest bloc and seats won by constituency
Prime Minister before election
Carl Gustaf Ekman
Free-minded
PM-elect
Arvid Lindman
Electoral League

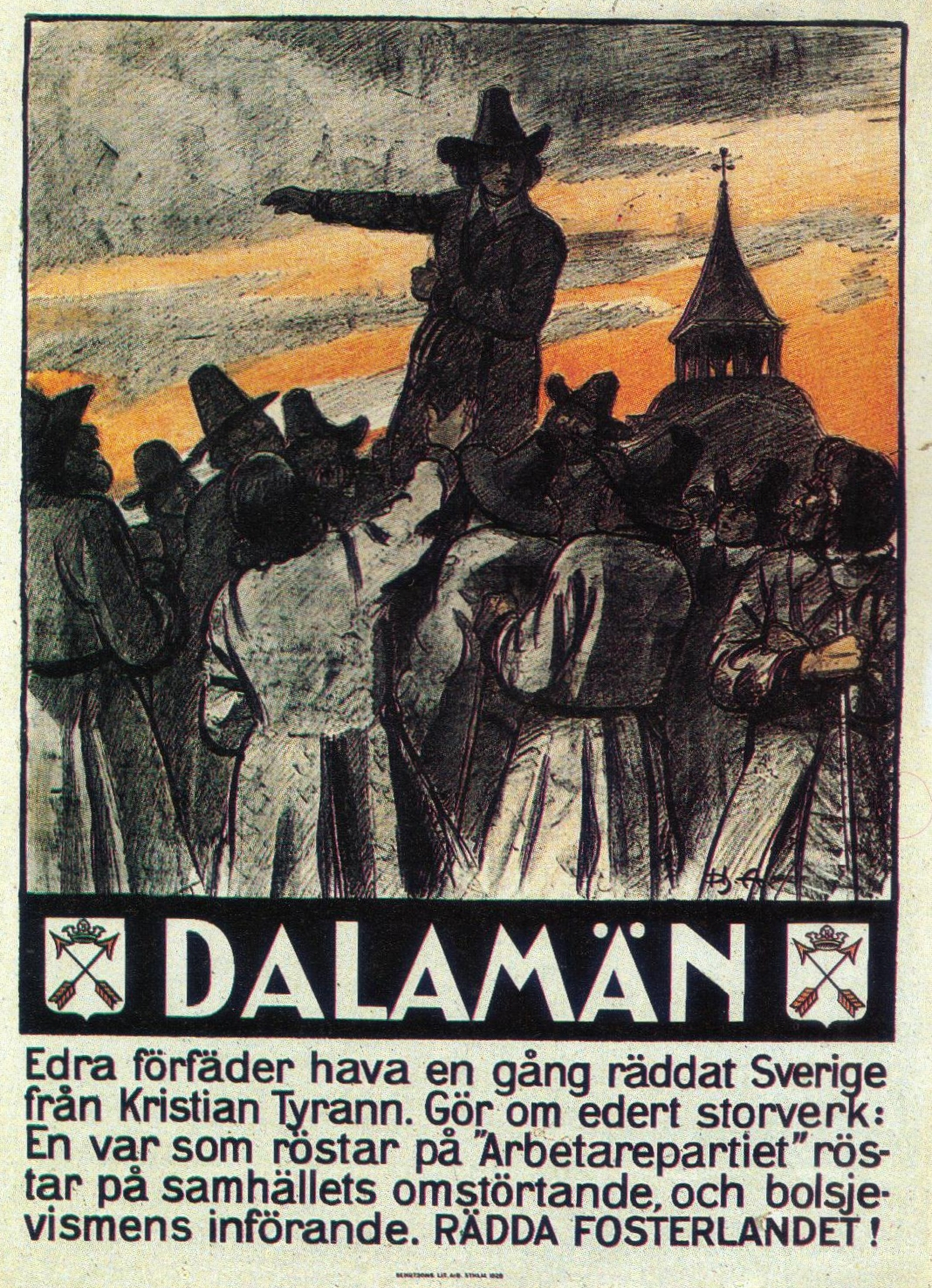
Election poster from the Conservative (or Right) Party. The text reads: "DALECARLIANS - Your forefathers have once saved Sweden from Christian the Tyrant. Redo your great work: Everyone who votes for the "Workers' Party" votes for the revolution of society, and the introduction of Bolshevism. SAVE THE FATHERLAND!"

General elections were held in Sweden between 15 and 21 September 1928. The Swedish Social Democratic Party remained the largest party, winning 90 of the 230 seats in the Andra kammaren of the Riksdag. Arvid Lindman of the General Electoral League became Prime Minister, replacing the incumbent, Carl Gustaf Ekman of the Free-minded National Association. The elections have since become known as the "Cossack election" due to the harsh tone and aggressive criticism used by both sides.

== Results ==
Party	Votes	%	Seats	+/–
Swedish Social Democratic Party	873,931	37.05	90	–14
General Electoral League	692,434	29.36	73	+8
Free-minded National Association	303,995	12.89	28	–1
Farmers' League	263,501	11.17	27	+4
Communist Party	151,567	6.43	8	+4
Liberal Party	70,820	3.00	4	0
Peace and Justice	1,037	0.04	0	New
Against Monopolies	712	0.03	0	New
Free List	301	0.01	0	New
Women's List	186	0.01	0	New
Västgöta Almogen Free Group	175	0.01	0	New
Other parties	152	0.01	0	–
Total	2,358,811	100.00	230	0
Valid votes	2,358,811	99.81		
Invalid/blank votes	4,490	0.19		
Total votes	2,363,301	100.00		
Registered voters/turnout	3,505,672	67.41		
Source: Nohlen & Stöver, SCB
