= Johannes Hellner =

Swedish jurist, politician and civil servant

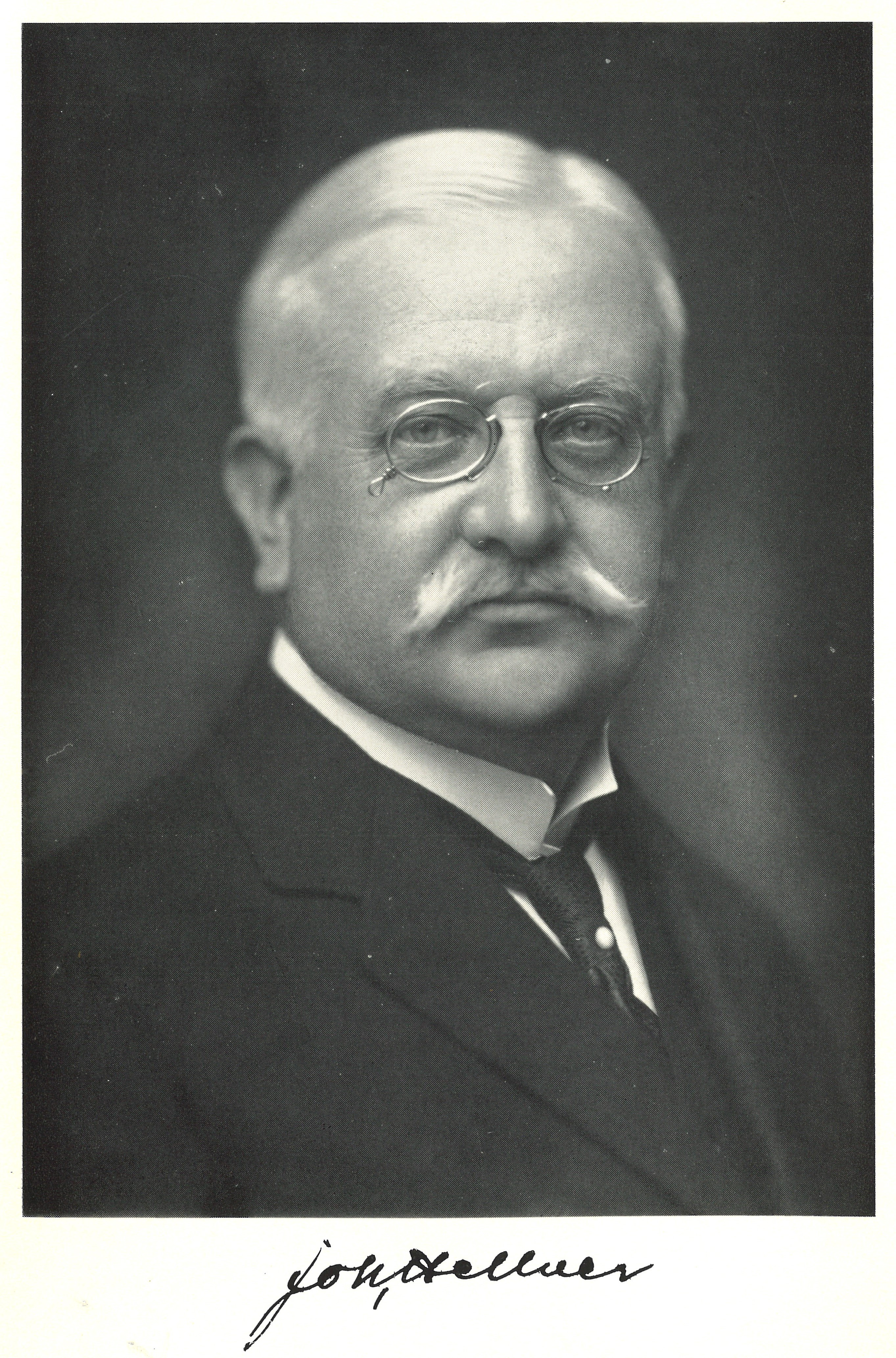
- Born: 22 April 1866; Svedala, Sweden
- Died: 19 February 1947 (aged 80); Stockholm
- Occupations: jurist, civil servant and politician

Johannes Hellner (22 April 1866 in Svedala – 19 February 1947 in Stockholm) was a Swedish jurist, civil servant and Liberal Coalition Party politician. He served as Minister for Foreign Affairs from 1917 to 1920.
