= Free-minded National Association =

Freeminded National Association Frisinnade Landsföreningen
- Founded: 1902
- Dissolved: 1934
- Preceded by: Folkpartiet, Bondeska diskussionsklubben, Friesenska diskussionsklubben
- Merged into: Liberal People's Party
- Ideology: Classical liberalism Alcohol prohibition
- International affiliation: Radical International

The Free-minded National Association (Swedish: Frisinnade landsföreningen) was a liberal political party and national organization in Sweden, active from 1902 to 1934. It was founded to organize liberal political forces at the national level and became associated with the Liberal Coalition Party in the Swedish Parliament. During the early twentieth century, the association participated in parliamentary and local elections and was linked to politicians including Karl Staaff, Nils Edén, and Carl Gustaf Ekman. Following internal disagreements over prohibition policy, the organization split in 1923. In 1934, it merged with the Liberal Party of Sweden to form the Liberal People's Party.

== History ==
The Free-minded National Association was formed at a meeting in Stockholm on 22–24 February 1902, as a national organization corresponding to the Liberal Coalition Party, which had been created in Parliament in 1900. According to its statutes, its purpose was "to unite the politically liberal-minded citizens of the country for common work and action; to promote the election to Parliament of men and women who support the program presented by the association in general elections; to promote the election of liberal representatives to county councils as well as city, municipal, and local councils; and otherwise to encourage sound democratic development within the state and municipalities."

The organization was based partly on local associations united into constituency federations, and partly on members directly affiliated with the association's main office in Stockholm (so-called supporting members). The constituency federations elected representatives to the association's council of confidence and to the national convention (the Free-minded National Convention), which the association held every other year in Stockholm. Leadership was exercised by an executive committee, within which a smaller working delegation could be appointed. The party headquarters, the office of the Free-minded National Association, was located in Stockholm. The association reached its peak in 1914, when it counted around 1,250 local branches with more than 50,000 members. After the party's electoral defeat that same year, the organization declined to around 450 local branches.

The Free-minded National Association achieved its greatest political success in the 1911 elections to the Second Chamber. The party won 101 seats in the Second Chamber, after which Karl Staaff formed his second cabinet. The association took an active part in the defence disputes of 1913–1914, but the party suffered major losses in both elections of 1914. In the 1917 general election, as well as in the 1919 Swedish county council elections, the party once again achieved success. This strength was also reflected in the fact that Nils Edén served as prime minister in the Liberal–Social Democratic government from 1917 to 1920.

However, forces of division began to emerge within the party. The wedge issue was the temperance question. At an extraordinary national convention on 27 May 1923, the prohibitionist faction gained the upper hand. This led to the split of the Free-minded National Association. Most representatives of the minority faction immediately left the association, and in October of the same year the Liberal Party of Sweden was formed. The Free-minded National Association thus continued, but now as the national organization of the Free-minded liberals under the leadership of Carl Gustaf Ekman.

Before the split, the Free-minded National Association had 530 local associations with 21,000 members; afterward, it had 297 associations with 10,777 members. The organization was later reorganized under the leadership of the secretary G. Hammarlund and by 1931 had around 13,500 members in approximately 400 local branches. In the elections of 1932, it attracted 244,577 voters. Until 1932, Carl Gustaf Ekman served as chairman of both the executive committee and the council of confidence.

From 1924 onward, a separate women's organization existed alongside the Free-minded National Association, the Women's Group of the Free-minded People's Party (Frisinnade folkpartiets kvinnogrupp), and from 1928 likewise a youth organization, the Swedish Free-minded Youth Federation, both of which worked in close cooperation with the main organization. In the press, the views of the Free-minded National Association and the Free-minded People's Party were represented by around 20 major newspapers, whose editors were united in the Swedish Free-minded Press Association (Sveriges frisinnade pressförening). In 1934, the Liberal People's Party was formed through the merger of the Free-minded National Association and the Liberal Party of Sweden.

== Leaders ==
- 1900–1905: Sixten von Friesen
- 1905–1915: Karl Staaff
- 1915–1918: Daniel Persson
- 1918–1924: Nils Edén
- 1924–1932: Carl Gustaf Ekman
- 1932–1935: Felix Hamrin

== Election results ==
Riksdag
Date	Votes			Seats		Position	Size
Date	No.	%	± pp	No.	±	Position	Size
1902	92,503	51.24	New	107 / 230	New	Opposition	1st
1905	98,287	45.23	▼6.01	109 / 230	▲2	Coalition	▼2nd
1908	144,426	46.83	▲1.6	105 / 230	▼4	Opposition	▲1st
1911	242,795	40.20	▼6.63	102 / 230	▼3	Coalition	▼1st
March 1914	245,107	32.24	▼7.96	71 / 230	▼31	Opposition	▼3rd
September 1914	196,493	26.87	▼5.37	57 / 230	▼14	Opposition	3rd
1917	202,936	27.57	▲0.7	62 / 230	▲5	Coalition	▲2nd
1920	143,355	21.78	▼5.79	47 / 230	▼15	Opposition	▼3rd
1921	325,608	18.69	▼3.09	41 / 230	▼6	Opposition	3rd
1924	228,913	12.97	▼5.72	29 / 230	▼12	Opposition	3rd
1928	303,995	12.89	▼0.8	28 / 230	▼1	Opposition	3rd
1932	244,577	9.80	▼3.09	20 / 230	▼8	Opposition	▼4th

== See also ==
- Liberalism and centrism in Sweden
