= Karl Staaff =

Prime minister of Sweden from 1905 to 1906 and 1911 to 1914

His Excellency Karl Staaff
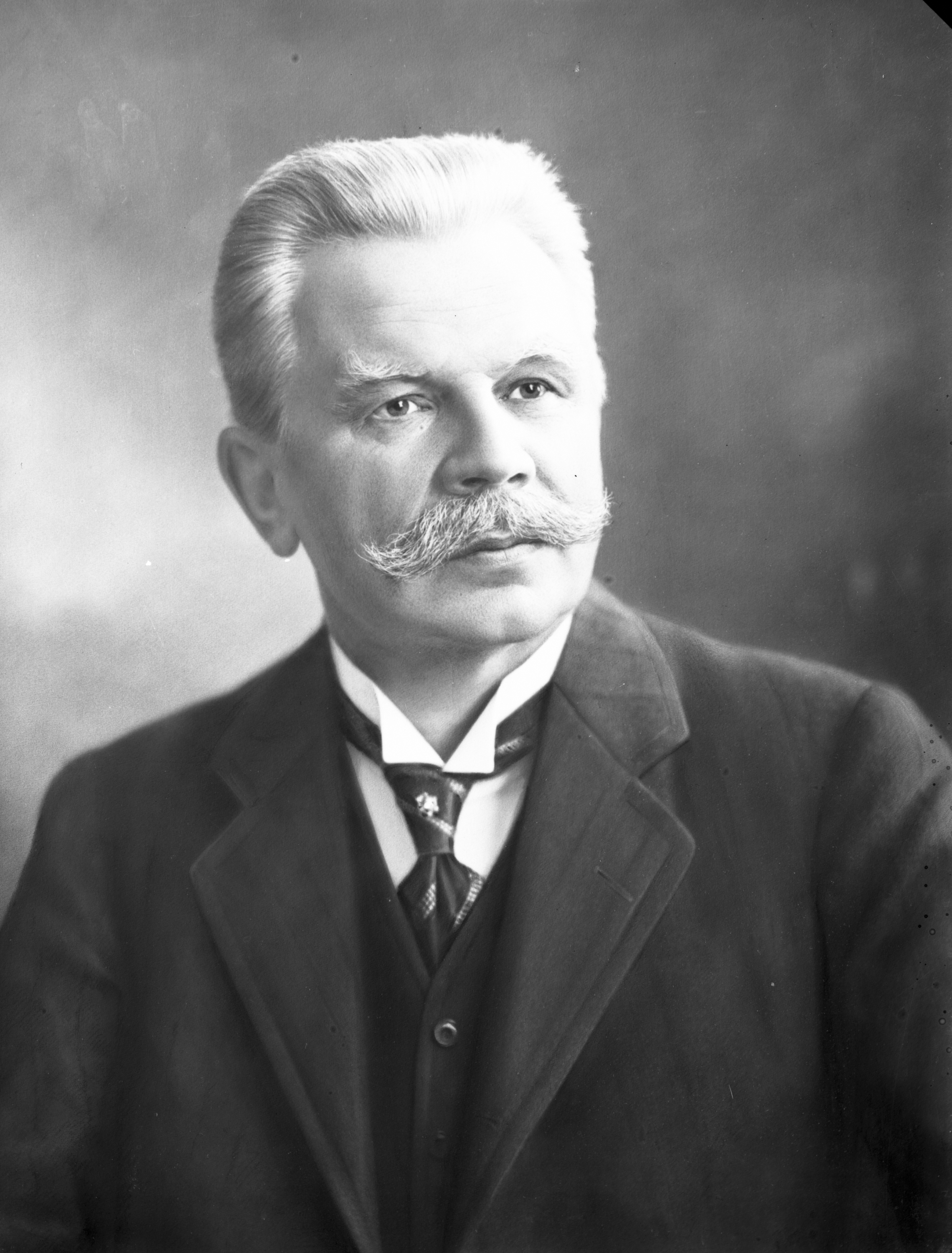

11th Prime Minister of Sweden
- In office 7 October 1911 – 17 February 1914
- Monarch: Gustaf V
- Preceded by: Arvid Lindman
- Succeeded by: Hjalmar Hammarskjöld
- In office 7 November 1905 – 29 May 1906
- Monarch: Oscar II
- Preceded by: Christian Lundeberg
- Succeeded by: Arvid Lindman

Personal details
- Born: Karl Albert Staaff; 21 January 1860 Stockholm, Sweden
- Died: 4 October 1915 (aged 55) Stockholm, Sweden
- Party: Liberal Coalition Party
- Spouse: None
- Education: Uppsala University

Karl Albert Staaff (21 January 1860 – 4 October 1915) was a Swedish liberal politician and lawyer who served as the Prime Minister of Sweden from 1905 to 1906 and again from 1911 to 1914. He was chairman of the Liberal Coalition Party from 1907 to 1915. He was Sweden's first liberal prime minister, as well as its last prime minister whose governance was ended by a lack of monarchical support.

== Biography ==
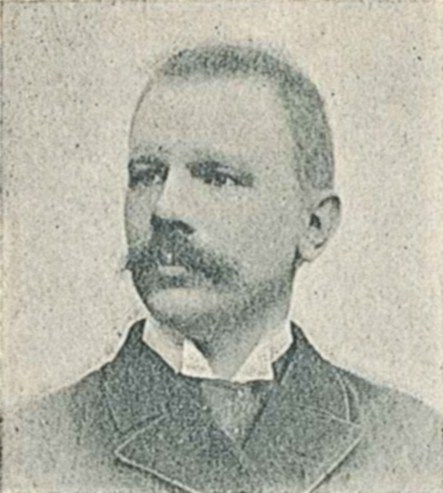
Staaff c. 1897, around the time he was elected to represent Stockholm in the Riksdag

Karl Albert Staaff was born on 21 January 1860 in the city of Stockholm. His parents were Albert Wilhelm Staaff and Fredrika Wilhelmina "Mina" Schöne.

From 1897 to 1915 Staaff was a member of the Riksdag's Andra kammar, Parliament's lower house. In 1905, he became a Minister without portfolio in Christian Lundeberg's cabinet. Lundeberg appointed him a delegate in Karlstad that year to negotiate the dissolution of the union between Norway and Sweden. The working relationship between the Swedish delegates was good, particularly between Staaff and ecclesiastical minister Hjalmar Hammarskjöld, who Staaff would appoint ambassador to Copenhagen that year, and who would succeed Staaff as prime minister in 1914.

Staaff was active in the Swedish movement for universal suffrage, and as the Liberal party's Prime Minister he presided in 1905 over an attempt to introduce universal and equal suffrage for men. His successor as party leader, Nils Edén, eventually managed to carry this further into universal suffrage in 1918–1919, including for women. Due to conservative intervention, Staaff's proposal for first-past-the-post voting was ultimately scrapped for a proportional system. In 1912, the period of leave that women were allowed following a child's birth was extended to six weeks, and in 1913 a tax-financed pension scheme was introduced.

Staaff ran into sharp conflict with the arch-conservatives, and became a hated figure in the conservative, pro-monarchic and anti-democratic establishment. An intense smear campaign was launched against him, picturing him as the destroyer of Swedish tradition and society. Wealthy Stockholmers could even buy ashtrays which were shaped after the likeness of his head. His staunch anti-military politics, which included a refusal to fund a new battleship for the Swedish Navy, led to the greatest fundraising effort up to that time in Swedish history. A total of 15 million kronor were raised in just a few months in 1912, entirely through public donations spurred on by King Gustav V, to help fund the construction of what would become the coastal defence ship HSwMS Sverige.

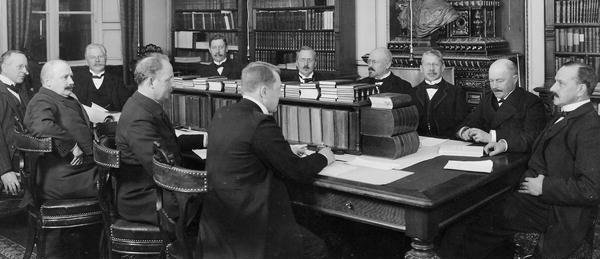
Staaff and his second cabinet (1911)

In 1914 Staaff stepped down from the government in protest after the conservatives had summoned a farmers' demonstration at the Royal castle's court in Stockholm, where King Gustaf V – who according to law was supposed to stay out of politics – denounced Staaff's defence policies.

The contemporary Swedish Liberal party the Liberals count him as the first among the more prominent leaders of Swedish 20th-century liberalism, followed by such parliamentarians as Nils Edén, Carl Ekman, Nobel Prize laureate Bertil Ohlin, Gunnar Helén, Per Ahlmark and Bengt Westerberg.

Staaff died on 4 October 1915, after a cold he contracted had developed into pneumonia. He never married.

Government offices
Preceded by Christian Lundeberg	Prime Minister of Sweden; 1905–1906	Succeeded by Arvid Lindman
Preceded by Arvid Lindman	Prime Minister of Sweden; 1911–1914	Succeeded by Hjalmar Hammarskjöld
