= Results of the 1932 Swedish general election =

Sweden held a general election around 17 September 1932.

== Results ==
Party	Votes	%	Seats	+/–
Swedish Social Democratic Party	1,040,689	41.71	104	+14
General Electoral League	585,248	23.46	58	–15
Farmers' League	351,215	14.08	36	+9
Free-minded National Association	244,577	9.80	20	–8
Communist Party (Kilbommare)	132,564	5.31	6	New
Communist Party (Sillénare)	74,245	2.98	2	–6
Liberal Party	48,722	1.95	4	0
Swedish National Socialist Party	15,170	0.61	0	New
Centre Party	2,501	0.10	0	New
Other parties	175	0.01	0	0
Total	2,495,106	100.00	230	0
Valid votes	2,495,106	99.76		
Invalid/blank votes	6,060	0.24		
Total votes	2,501,166	100.00		
Registered voters/turnout	3,698,935	67.62		
Source: Nohlen & Stöver, SCB

The Clerical People's Party, albeit a separate party, received 8,911 votes or 0.4% of the vote share, but had the votes reassigned to the General Electoral League as a result of them forfeiting their votes out of tactical purposes and were listed as Electoral League or "Rightist" votes in the official final results. No Clerical People's Party member got elected to the Riksdag, which meant the Electoral League covered the entire rightist delegation. Therefore, the General Electoral League may correctly be attributed to both 23.1% and 23.5% of the overall vote share. The Liberal Party got 393 extra votes via electoral co-operation with a minor party in the Stockholm County constituency, which also was not listed in the results above.

== Constituency results ==
=== Percentage share ===
Location	Land	Share	Votes	S	AV	B	F	KP	K	LP	Other	Left	Right	Margin
Location		%		%	%	%	%	%	%	%	%	%	%	
Blekinge	G	2.1	52,484	39.0	30.0	10.3	14.8	2.9	3.0	0.0	0.0	44.9	55.1	5,339
Bohuslän	G	3.1	77,954	37.8	26.4	17.3	3.8	1.9	2.4	9.2	1.2	42.1	56.7	11,436
Gothenburg	G	4.3	107,095	47.5	26.7	0.0	0.0	2.4	8.8	8.9	5.7	58.7	35.6	24,726
Gotland	G	1.0	24,522	24.8	18.0	42.1	15.1	0.0	0.0	0.0	0.0	24.8	75.2	12,378
Gävleborg	N	4.1	102,428	42.6	11.5	14.4	11.3	13.4	6.8	0.0	0.0	62.8	37.2	26,155
Halland	G	2.6	63,897	31.4	26.2	33.5	3.3	1.2	2.5	1.9	0.0	35.0	65.0	19,132
Jämtland	N	1.9	48,462	44.1	23.5	12.9	16.4	0.6	2.5	0.0	0.0	47.2	52.8	2,749
Jönköping	G	3.9	96,653	32.2	25.1	22.0	17.2	2.0	1.6	0.0	0.0	35.8	64.2	27,501
Kalmar	G	3.6	90,939	34.0	29.0	26.5	6.1	0.6	3.8	0.0	0.0	38.3	61.7	21,300
Kopparberg	S	3.7	92,078	43.9	12.0	12.0	16.7	14.1	1.1	0.0	0.2	59.2	40.6	17,123
Kristianstad	G	3.8	93,689	39.9	20.0	21.8	14.7	0.2	1.7	2.2	0.0	41.8	58.2	15,412
Kronoberg	G	2.4	60,746	31.2	33.3	24.8	5.4	2.0	3.3	0.0	0.0	36.5	63.5	16,375
Malmö area	G	4.4	110,467	58.8	30.2	0.0	6.7	1.7	1.1	1.0	0.5	61.6	37.9	26,248
Malmöhus	G	4.9	122,940	49.1	12.9	27.5	2.1	1.2	0.2	6.7	0.3	50.6	49.1	1,833
Norrbotten	N	2.5	62,420	30.0	26.5	9.1	7.7	1.2	25.4	0.0	0.0	56.7	43.3	8,310
Skaraborg	G	4.0	100,677	30.3	26.6	26.8	13.1	2.2	1.0	0.0	0.0	33.5	66.4	33,128
Stockholm	S	10.1	253,033	44.1	32.4	0.0	3.5	11.8	2.0	4.7	1.5	57.8	40.6	43,481
Stockholm County	S	4.4	109,803	45.7	23.2	10.4	6.6	10.1	1.2	2.3	0.5	57.1	42.4	16,125
Södermanland	S	3.1	77,610	52.6	17.0	11.4	13.1	5.7	0.2	0.0	0.0	58.6	41.4	13,286
Uppsala	S	2.1	53,423	39.6	20.0	15.8	10.5	11.3	0.1	2.7	0.0	51.0	49.0	1,096
Värmland	S	4.3	108,285	43.6	15.8	9.6	13.0	10.6	2.7	1.8	2.9	56.9	40.3	18,012
Västerbotten	N	2.9	71,363	28.7	26.5	7.4	34.2	0.8	2.4	0.0	0.0	31.9	68.1	25,871
Västernorrland	N	4.2	105,455	46.2	17.1	13.9	9.5	6.6	6.7	0.0	0.0	59.4	40.6	19,848
Västmanland	S	2.6	64,407	49.9	15.6	14.4	11.1	6.7	2.3	0.0	0.0	58.9	41.1	11,413
Älvsborg N	G	2.8	68,834	38.4	21.1	23.9	10.4	1.9	0.8	2.8	0.7	41.0	58.3	11,902
Älvsborg S	G	2.3	57,330	29.4	37.9	20.9	7.7	2.8	0.9	0.0	0.4	33.0	66.6	19,243
Örebro	S	3.5	88,008	45.9	16.5	10.7	17.1	8.0	0.8	0.0	1.0	54.6	44.4	9,039
Östergötland	G	5.2	130,104	45.9	28.2	11.9	9.0	3.5	1.5	0.0	0.0	50.9	49.1	2,414
Total		100.0	2,495,106	41.7	23.5	14.1	9.8	5.3	3.0	2.0	0.7	50.0	49.3	17,736
Source: SCB

=== By votes ===
Location	Land	Share	Votes	S	AV	B	F	KP	K	LP	Other	Left	Right	Margin
Location		%												
Blekinge	G	2.1	52,484	20,473	15,752	5,390	7,766	1,513	1,583		7	23,569	28,908	5,339
Bohuslän	G	3.1	77,954	29,441	20,611	13,518	2,954	1,495	1,865	7,154	916	32,801	44,237	11,436
Gothenburg	G	4.3	107,095	50,824	28,648			2,623	9,425	9,498	6,077	62,872	38,146	24,726
Gotland	G	1.0	24,522	6,072	4,411	10,326	3,713					6,072	18,450	12,378
Gävleborg	N	4.1	102,428	43,607	11,749	14,748	11,638	13,712	6,971		3	64,290	38,135	26,155
Halland	G	2.6	63,897	20,084	16,738	21,427	2,103	696	1,601	1,245	3	22,381	41,513	19,132
Jämtland	N	1.9	48,462	21,354	11,410	6,248	7,947	281	1,221		1	22,856	25,605	2,749
Jönköping	G	3.9	96,653	31,078	24,287	21,293	16,495	1,908	1,588		4	34,574	62,075	27,501
Kalmar	G	3.6	90,939	30,880	26,414	24,115	5,587	544	3,392		7	34,816	56,116	21,300
Kopparberg	S	3.7	92,078	40,454	11,039	10,961	15,381	13,025	1,025		193	54,504	37,381	17,123
Kristianstad	G	3.8	93,689	37,370	18,728	19,970	13,757	172	1,594	2,093	5	39,136	54,548	15,412
Kronoberg	G	2.4	60,746	18,924	20,247	15,054	3,258	1,232	2,028		3	22,184	38,559	16,375
Malmö area	G	4.4	110,467	64,984	33,331		7,375	1,848	1,236	1,114	579	68,068	41,820	26,248
Malmöhus	G	4.9	122,940	60,339	15,803	33,806	2,453	1,485	368	8,297	389	62,192	60,359	1,833
Norrbotten	N	2.5	62,420	18,789	16,537	5,691	4,825	734	15,840		4	35,363	27,053	8,310
Skaraborg	G	4.0	100,677	30,566	26,785	26,953	13,155	2,213	986		19	33,765	66,893	33,128
Stockholm	S	10.1	253,033	111,480	81,981		8,955	29,779	5,056	11,898	3,884	146,315	102,834	43,481
Stockholm County	S	4.4	109,803	50,198	25,418	11,469	7,205	11,126	1,351	2,458	578	62,675	46,550	16,125
Södermanland	S	3.1	77,610	40,840	13,108	8,875	10,178	4,442	165		2	45,447	32,161	13,286
Uppsala	S	2.1	53,423	21,142	10,675	8,435	5,630	6,031	86	1,423	1	27,259	26,163	1,096
Värmland	S	4.3	108,285	47,206	17,086	10,381	14,140	11,441	2,953	1,981	3,097	61,600	43,588	18,012
Västerbotten	N	2.9	71,363	20,466	18,931	5,275	24,408	559	1,718		6	22,743	48,614	25,871
Västernorrland	N	4.2	105,455	48,697	18,089	14,632	10,081	6,925	7,028		3	62,650	42,802	19,848
Västmanland	S	2.6	64,407	32,124	10,035	9,283	7,176	4,297	1,486		6	37,907	26,494	11,413
Älvsborg N	G	2.8	68,834	26,400	14,512	16,481	7,166	1,276	535	1,954	510	28,211	40,113	11,902
Älvsborg S	G	2.3	57,330	16,821	21,745	11,995	4,423	1,607	492		247	18,920	38,163	19,243
Örebro	S	3.5	88,008	40,378	14,520	9,429	15,086	7,006	690		899	48,074	39,035	9,039
Östergötland	G	5.2	130,104	59,698	36,658	15,460	11,722	4,594	1,962		10	66,254	63,840	2,414
Total		100.0	2,495,106	1,040,689	585,248	351,215	244,577	132,564	74,245	48,722	17,846	1,247,498	1,230,155	17,343
Source: SCB

== Results by city and district ==
=== Blekinge ===
Location	Share	Votes	S	AV	B	F	KP	K	L-vote	R-vote	Left	Right	Margin
Location	%		%	%	%	%	%	%			%	%	
Bräkne	14.9	7,822	45.1	22.9	18.4	7.5	1.1	5.0	4,007	3,815	51.2	48.8	192
Karlshamn	6.3	3,322	37.4	43.1	0.8	12.1	0.9	5.7	1,461	1,861	44.0	56.0	400
Karlskrona	16.9	8,858	38.9	40.8	0.3	15.6	3.5	0.9	3,839	5,019	43.3	56.7	1,180
Lister	18.1	9,474	35.5	30.4	12.0	16.8	0.8	4.6	3,866	5,608	40.8	59.2	1,742
Medelstad	20.7	10,857	40.0	23.7	15.6	12.8	4.7	3.3	5,205	5,650	47.9	52.0	445
Ronneby	4.8	2,530	45.6	33.6	0.8	12.3	4.3	3.3	1,346	1,183	53.2	46.8	163
Sölvesborg	3.2	1,679	40.6	31.3	0.1	17.2	10.4	0.5	864	815	51.5	48.5	49
Östra	14.5	7,586	34.5	25.7	13.8	22.6	2.8	0.6	2,875	4,710	37.9	62.1	1,835
Postal vote	0.7	356							106	247			141
Total	2.1	52,484	39.0	30.0	10.3	14.8	2.9	3.0	23,569	28,908	44.9	55.1	5,339
Source: SCB

=== Gothenburg and Bohuslän ===
==== Bohuslän ====
Location	Share	Votes	S	AV	B	F	KP	K	LP	L-vote	R-vote	Left	Right	Margin
Location	%		%	%	%	%	%	%	%			%	%	
Askim	9.4	7,360	42.5	27.9	9.4	5.0	4.1	2.5	5.5	3,611	3,515	49.1	47.8	96
Bullaren	1.0	792	2.9	24.7	56.6	2.3	0.6	0.6	11.7	33	755	4.2	95.3	722
Inlands Fräkne	2.3	1,815	22.1	32.0	29.9	4.7	0.0	0.1	10.5	404	1,398	22.3	77.0	994
Inlands Nordre	4.9	3,852	18.7	40.6	31.3	2.1	0.0	0.0	6.6	721	3,103	18.7	80.6	2,382
Inlands Södre	3.4	2,675	16.0	35.3	41.4	1.4	0.0	0.5	3.0	443	2,166	16.6	81.0	1,723
Inlands Torpe	2.2	1,745	54.6	13.5	28.2	1.0	0.0	0.5	2.0	962	781	55.1	44.8	181
Kungälv	1.4	1,103	53.2	38.3	1.6	3.4	0.2	0.5	2.2	594	503	53.9	45.6	91
Kville	3.0	2,331	31.1	13.3	33.2	0.7	0.4	0.4	21.0	744	1,587	31.9	68.1	843
Lane	3.8	2,951	25.8	19.4	34.6	0.1	0.6	0.3	18.8	788	2,154	26.7	73.0	1,366
Lysekil	3.5	2,750	52.9	35.6	0.0	2.8	1.8	2.5	4.1	1,572	1,167	57.2	42.6	405
Marstrand	0.7	510	43.1	42.4	0.0	3.9	2.2	0.0	4.1	231	279	45.3	54.7	48
Mölndal	8.1	6,324	56.5	11.3	2.5	2.0	5.6	13.7	6.8	4,799	1,420	75.9	22.5	3,379
Orust Västra	4.2	3,267	12.8	52.2	15.2	4.1	0.0	0.0	15.6	418	2,842	12.8	87.0	2,424
Orust Östra	2.0	1,574	18.2	28.3	35.7	0.8	0.0	0.0	17.0	286	1,287	18.2	81.8	1,001
Sotenäs	6.5	5,039	43.9	19.7	3.5	7.9	8.8	0.1	16.1	2,660	2,379	52.8	47.2	281
Strömstad	1.3	1,047	38.9	41.1	2.1	7.4	1.1	3.6	3.3	457	565	43.6	54.0	108
Stångenäs	5.1	3,948	54.2	30.4	6.5	0.3	0.0	1.1	7.6	2,182	1,766	55.3	44.7	416
Sävedal	5.0	3,873	48.5	18.4	14.3	3.3	1.9	7.5	4.1	2,243	1,551	57.9	40.0	692
Sörbygden	1.9	1,460	5.1	43.0	48.6	0.0	0.0	0.0	3.4	74	1,386	5.1	94.9	1,312
Tanum	3.5	2,765	25.1	31.8	28.1	3.3	0.0	1.7	8.6	742	1,986	26.8	71.8	1,244
Tjörn	2.6	2,038	8.5	26.0	22.7	10.6	0.0	0.0	31.7	173	1,853	8.5	90.9	1,680
Tunge	4.2	3,276	47.4	20.4	19.0	0.4	0.2	0.7	11.8	1,582	1,690	48.3	51.6	108
Uddevalla	8.4	6,527	54.0	25.9	0.6	3.0	1.7	0.9	12.7	3,701	2,752	56.7	42.2	949
Vette	4.9	3,808	50.0	9.5	30.2	3.1	2.0	0.8	2.3	2,009	1,718	52.8	45.1	291
Västra Hising	6.0	4,674	22.7	32.8	22.1	14.4	0.5	3.0	2.6	1,222	3,357	26.1	71.8	2,135
Östra Hising	0.5	415	30.8	7.2	50.6	1.2	0.0	2.7	2.2	139	254	33.5	61.2	115
Postal vote	0.0	35								11	23			12
Total	3.1	77,954	37.8	26.4	17.3	3.8	1.9	2.4	9.2	32,801	44,237	42.1	56.7	11,436
Source: SCB

==== Gothenburg ====
Location	Share	Votes	S	AV	KP	K	LP	L-vote	R-vote	Left	Right	Margin
Location	%		%	%	%	%	%			%	%	
Gothenburg	100.0	107,095	47.5	26.7	2.4	8.8	8.9	62,872	38,146	58.7	35.6	24,726
Total	4.3	107,095	47.5	26.7	2.4	8.8	8.9	62,872	38,146	58.7	35.6	24,726
Source: SCB

=== Gotland ===
Location	Share	Votes	S	AV	B	F	L-vote	R-vote	Left	Right	Margin
Location	%		%	%	%	%			%	%	
Gotland Norra	41.9	10,263	27.0	11.7	50.6	10.8	2,767	7,496	27.0	73.0	4,729
Gotland Södra	40.5	9,922	13.0	12.6	51.0	23.3	1,294	8,628	13.0	87.0	7,334
Visby	17.6	4,311	46.2	45.3	1.7	6.8	1,993	2,318	46.2	53.8	325
Postal vote	0.1	26					18	8			10
Total	1.0	24,522	24.8	18.0	42.1	15.1	6,072	18,450	24.8	75.2	12,378
Source: SCB

=== Gävleborg ===
Location	Share	Votes	S	AV	B	F	KP	K	L-vote	R-vote	Left	Right	Margin
Location	%		%	%	%	%	%	%			%	%	
Ala	10.2	10,479	48.1	5.0	16.2	6.0	6.8	18.0	7,629	2,850	72.8	27.2	4,779
Bergsjö-Forsa	9.1	9,280	30.2	6.3	36.5	11.8	10.3	5.0	4,215	5,065	45.4	54.6	850
Bollnäs	12.6	12,917	41.4	6.9	20.3	14.9	8.1	8.4	7,481	5,436	57.9	42.1	2,045
Delsbo	3.3	3,397	27.1	8.5	50.9	3.8	8.0	1.7	1,251	2,146	36.8	63.2	895
Enånger	2.7	2,815	35.6	6.9	20.6	8.7	21.9	6.3	1,795	1,020	63.8	36.2	775
Gästrikland Västra	11.6	11,897	42.3	10.7	12.4	11.7	20.4	2.5	7,762	4,135	65.2	34.8	3,627
Gästrikland Östra	16.2	16,630	47.6	8.5	6.1	12.2	22.6	3.0	12,177	4,453	73.2	26.8	7,724
Gävle	15.0	15,323	51.9	21.1	0.0	15.2	10.6	1.2	9,760	5,562	63.7	36.3	4,198
Hudiksvall	2.8	2,890	26.0	29.5	3.1	14.2	18.3	9.0	1,539	1,351	53.3	46.7	188
Söderhamn	5.0	5,072	43.1	22.6	0.0	7.4	5.6	21.2	3,548	1,524	70.0	30.0	2,024
Västra Hälsingland	11.4	11,692	39.6	11.5	18.4	9.2	12.7	8.6	7,116	4,576	60.9	39.1	2,540
Postal vote	0.0	36							17	17			0
Total	4.1	102,428	42.6	11.5	14.4	11.3	13.4	6.8	64,290	38,135	62.8	37.2	26,155
Source: SCB

=== Halland ===
The two liberal parties, the Free-minded National Association and the Liberal Party, ran on a joint list, with their separate results only reported in the national count.

Location	Share	Votes	S	AV	B	F	KP	K	L-vote	R-vote	Left	Right	Margin
Location	%		%	%	%	%	%	%			%	%	
Falkenberg	3.7	2,361	43.7	35.8	4.7	6.4	8.3	1.2	1,255	1,106	53.2	46.8	149
Faurås	10.6	6,779	17.6	22.8	54.8	2.8	1.0	1.0	1,329	5,450	19.6	80.4	4,121
Fjäre	11.4	7,309	20.6	28.7	49.1	1.1	0.4	0.2	1,544	5,765	21.1	78.9	4,221
Halmstad	16.0	10,224	49.4	29.7	1.1	9.2	2.5	8.1	6,135	4,088	60.0	40.0	2,047
Halmstad Hundred	10.9	6,971	39.8	23.4	27.8	5.5	0.2	3.3	3,020	3,951	43.3	56.7	931
Himle	7.8	4,987	15.0	27.1	50.3	6.7	0.2	0.7	797	4,190	16.0	84.0	3,393
Hök	11.9	7,620	23.4	10.8	61.1	4.3	0.1	0.3	1,814	5,806	23.8	76.2	3,992
Kungsbacka	1.6	1,022	39.1	50.2	3.7	5.5	1.5	0.0	415	607	40.6	59.4	192
Laholm	1.9	1,191	42.2	30.6	17.1	9.4	0.0	0.7	511	680	42.9	57.1	169
Tönnersjö	7.0	4,490	38.9	21.1	28.9	6.0	0.5	4.6	1,975	2,514	44.0	56.0	539
Varberg	6.2	3,955	48.1	36.1	1.9	9.4	1.0	3.5	2,081	1,874	52.6	47.4	207
Viske	3.7	2,372	14.8	23.4	57.5	4.2	0.0	0.2	356	2,016	15.0	85.0	1,660
Årstad	7.2	4,585	23.7	34.4	39.8	0.8	1.0	0.2	1,141	3,444	24.9	75.1	2,303
Postal vote	0.0	31							8	22			14
Total	2.6	63,897	31.4	26.2	33.5	5.2	1.2	2.5	22,381	41,513	35.0	65.0	19,132
Source: SCB

=== Jämtland ===
Location	Share	Votes	S	AV	B	F	KP	K	L-vote	R-vote	Left	Right	Margin
Location	%		%	%	%	%	%	%			%	%	
Berg	4.5	2,202	34.1	27.8	12.5	20.9	1.4	3.3	853	1,349	38.7	61.3	496
Hammerdal	11.7	5,652	44.3	26.2	14.6	12.2	0.2	2.5	2,656	2,996	47.0	53.0	340
Hede	2.9	1,422	47.9	13.2	6.9	28.3	0.0	3.7	734	688	51.6	48.4	46
Lits-Rödön	15.4	7,461	37.2	16.2	20.2	23.3	0.6	2.5	3,002	4,459	40.2	59.8	1,457
Ragunda	12.7	6,154	57.5	22.6	10.6	6.8	1.2	1.4	3,695	2,458	60.0	39.9	1,237
Revsund-Brunflo-Näs	13.9	6,741	44.8	23.2	15.7	14.0	1.2	1.2	3,180	3,561	47.2	52.8	381
Sunne-Oviken-Hallen	8.1	3,947	30.9	22.6	21.3	23.6	0.0	1.6	1,282	2,665	32.5	67.5	1,383
Sveg	6.5	3,141	64.8	13.2	8.2	9.4	0.7	3.7	2,175	966	69.2	30.8	1,209
Undersåker-Offerdal	12.5	6,041	40.3	21.3	10.3	23.6	0.3	4.2	2,708	3,333	44.8	55.2	625
Östersund	11.7	5,683	42.2	41.6	2.0	11.3	0.0	3.0	2,566	3,117	45.2	54.8	551
Postal vote	0.0	18							5	13			8
Total	1.9	48,462	44.1	23.5	12.9	16.4	0.6	2.5	22,856	25,605	47.2	52.8	2,749
Source: SCB

=== Jönköping ===
Location	Share	Votes	S	AV	B	F	KP	K	L-vote	R-vote	Left	Right	Margin
Location	%		%	%	%	%	%	%			%	%	
Eksjö	2.7	2,634	33.2	41.6	1.6	19.5	3.9	0.2	983	1,651	37.3	62.7	668
Gränna	0.6	564	18.8	48.9	4.3	24.6	0.0	3.4	125	439	22.2	77.8	314
Huskvarna	3.7	3,561	56.1	21.2	0.2	12.3	0.4	9.8	2,361	1,200	66.3	33.7	1,161
Jönköping	13.7	13,271	47.8	32.0	0.6	17.1	1.0	1.4	6,666	6,605	50.2	49.8	61
Mo	2.9	2,759	12.1	34.6	28.2	25.0	0.0	0.1	337	2,422	12.2	87.8	2,085
Norra Vedbo	6.2	6,025	20.1	31.0	27.1	19.2	2.4	0.2	1,368	4,657	22.7	77.3	3,289
Nässjö	4.1	3,976	57.0	21.2	0.7	16.0	1.7	8.8	2,377	1,599	59.8	40.2	778
Södra Vedbo	6.6	6,395	26.8	15.7	32.9	20.1	3.4	1.0	1,997	4,397	31.2	68.8	2,400
Tranås	2.8	2,673	42.1	24.9	0.6	26.0	5.4	1.0	1,297	1,376	48.5	51.5	79
Tveta	9.2	8,890	39.4	20.2	23.1	14.3	0.7	2.4	3,770	5,120	42.4	57.6	1,350
Vetlanda	1.5	1,494	41.2	35.4	0.9	17.9	0.0	4.6	684	810	45.8	54.2	126
Vista	2.9	2,758	14.9	32.9	42.8	8.7	0.0	0.6	428	2,330	15.5	84.5	1,902
Värnamo	1.8	1,777	46.1	32.2	0.3	16.2	2.1	3.0	911	866	51.3	48.7	45
Västbo	13.8	13,316	27.8	17.7	37.6	13.0	3.2	0.7	4,224	9,092	31.7	68.3	4,868
Västra	11.0	10,643	20.4	17.5	39.2	19.0	2.5	1.4	2,591	8,051	24.3	75.6	5,460
Östbo	8.4	8,098	25.0	38.3	19.5	13.9	1.9	1.3	2,286	5,811	28.2	71.8	3,525
Östra	8.1	7,789	23.8	17.0	33.0	22.2	1.7	2.2	2,158	5,631	27.7	72.3	3,473
Postal vote	0.0	30							11	18			7
Total	3.9	96,653	32.2	25.1	22.0	17.2	2.0	1.6	34,574	62,075	35.8	64.2	27,501
Source: SCB

=== Kalmar ===
Location	Share	Votes	S	AV	B	F	KP	K	L-vote	R-vote	Left	Right	Margin
Location	%		%	%	%	%	%	%			%	%	
Algutsrum	2.7	2,420	29.2	36.7	31.9	2.0	0.0	0.1	710	1,710	29.3	70.7	1,000
Aspeland	6.5	5,901	38.5	19.6	29.1	10.5	0.3	2.0	2,406	3,493	40.8	59.2	1,087
Borgholm	1.0	864	35.4	44.4	5.8	12.6	0.0	1.7	321	543	37.2	62.8	222
Gräsgård	2.0	1,831	43.1	23.8	30.1	2.3	0.0	0.6	801	1,030	43.7	56.3	229
Handbörd	6.3	5,764	33.3	24.0	29.2	5.5	0.5	7.7	2,383	3,381	41.3	58.7	998
Kalmar	9.7	8,842	50.7	41.1	1.7	2.7	0.0	3.7	4,814	4,028	54.4	45.6	786
Möckleby	1.4	1,245	7.3	42.0	50.1	0.6	0.0	0.0	91	1,154	7.3	92.7	1,063
Norra Möre	5.1	4,678	36.1	30.6	29.5	2.8	0.0	1.1	1,740	2,938	37.2	62.8	1,198
Norra Tjust	7.1	6,447	38.4	28.4	25.9	5.4	1.1	0.8	2,600	3,847	40.3	59.7	1,247
Nybro	2.1	1,938	44.1	33.2	2.9	6.8	0.3	12.8	1,108	830	57.2	42.8	278
Oskarshamn	4.1	3,723	46.7	29.3	0.4	12.8	0.0	10.8	2,140	1,583	57.5	42.5	557
Runsten	1.9	1,683	4.6	20.0	74.6	0.5	0.0	0.3	82	1,601	4.9	95.1	1,519
Sevede	6.6	6,005	23.0	27.4	39.1	9.1	0.2	1.3	1,467	4,538	24.4	75.6	3,071
Slättbo	1.3	1,152	16.1	20.9	58.6	2.3	0.0	2.0	208	943	18.1	81.9	735
Stranda	6.4	5,865	36.6	23.1	22.4	7.8	0.3	9.8	2,738	3,127	46.7	53.3	389
Södra Möre	15.0	13,616	28.9	30.2	35.6	3.4	0.4	1.5	4,194	9,422	30.8	69.2	5,228
Södra Tjust	8.2	7,502	37.4	22.3	26.6	5.8	1.1	6.8	3,403	4,098	45.4	54.6	695
Tunalän	4.3	3,893	24.1	30.2	32.6	8.3	0.1	4.7	1,126	2,767	28.9	71.1	1,641
Vimmerby	1.5	1,395	26.2	51.0	7.3	13.6	1.3	0.5	391	1,004	28.0	72.0	613
Västervik	4.2	3,858	34.1	40.1	1.0	15.2	6.0	3.5	1,684	2,172	43.6	56.3	488
Åkerbo	2.5	2,281	17.1	8.8	70.2	3.6	0.0	0.3	396	1,885	17.4	82.6	1,489
Postal vote	0.0	36							13	22			9
Total	3.6	90,939	34.0	29.0	26.5	6.1	0.6	3.8	34,816	56,116	38.3	61.7	21,300
Source: SCB

=== Kopparberg ===
Location	Share	Votes	S	AV	B	F	KP	K	L-vote	R-vote	Left	Right	Margin
Location	%		%	%	%	%	%	%			%	%	
Avesta	2.5	2,317	53.2	8.2	0.0	8.6	29.7	0.3	1,926	391	83.1	16.9	1,535
Falu Norra	8.5	7,870	43.4	9.9	10.2	20.9	14.9	0.6	4,634	3,230	58.9	41.0	1,404
Falu Södra	13.0	12,003	44.2	8.4	16.9	11.0	19.3	0.3	7,656	4,347	63.8	36.2	3,309
Falun	5.4	5,009	42.5	32.8	0.4	17.0	4.2	1.4	2,409	2,515	48.1	50.2	106
Folkare	7.0	6,449	43.6	11.4	18.2	11.5	13.4	1.9	3,801	2,648	58.9	41.1	1,153
Hedemora	1.6	1,513	40.3	27.8	2.9	21.8	5.9	1.0	715	794	47.3	52.5	79
Hedemora ting	8.2	7,543	46.1	7.1	28.9	8.6	7.0	2.3	4,179	3,364	55.4	44.6	815
Leksand-Gagnef	8.6	7,951	32.9	10.7	13.6	35.2	7.3	0.0	3,201	4,735	40.3	59.6	1,534
Ludvika	2.7	2,447	57.3	19.3	0.5	9.2	12.8	0.9	1,737	710	71.0	29.0	1,027
Malung	5.9	5,433	51.0	13.2	3.3	22.5	9.3	0.7	3,312	2,121	61.0	39.0	1,191
Mora	6.3	5,808	36.0	16.0	10.6	25.5	11.6	0.2	2,781	3,023	47.9	52.0	242
Nås	6.5	6,003	44.8	11.0	12.3	11.8	18.8	1.3	3,894	2,108	64.9	35.1	1,786
Orsa	3.2	2,953	44.5	12.6	13.3	16.2	13.3	0.0	1,708	1,244	57.8	42.1	464
Rättvik	4.0	3,718	34.0	9.3	13.3	27.5	9.8	5.9	1,852	1,865	49.8	50.2	13
Särna-Idre	0.9	810	41.9	12.2	0.2	30.0	15.7	0.0	466	344	57.5	42.5	122
Säter	0.9	802	57.2	21.2	0.4	13.1	5.9	0.4	524	278	65.3	34.7	246
Västerbergslag	12.4	11,430	51.0	8.0	7.7	9.5	22.3	1.5	8,550	2,878	74.8	25.2	5,672
Älvdalen	2.2	1,997	34.8	9.3	15.8	13.6	22.4	0.5	1,151	773	57.6	38.7	378
Postal vote	0.0	22							8	13			5
Total	3.7	92,078	43.9	12.0	12.0	16.7	14.1	1.1	54,504	37,381	59.2	40.6	17,123
Source: SCB

=== Kristianstad ===
Location	Share	Votes	S	AV	B	F	KP	K	LP	L-vote	R-vote	Left	Right	Margin
Location	%		%	%	%	%	%	%	%			%	%	
Albo	3.5	3,271	34.2	14.0	19.4	24.2	0.0	1.4	6.7	1,166	2,105	35.6	64.4	939
Bjäre	6.1	5,742	27.6	29.6	35.9	6.3	0.1	0.4	0.2	1,614	4,128	28.1	71.9	2,514
Gärd	9.2	8,647	44.9	14.5	13.2	24.5	0.0	2.1	0.9	4,063	4,584	47.0	53.0	521
Hässleholm	1.6	1,459	46.7	34.3	0.8	16.1	0.1	0.1	1.8	685	773	46.9	53.0	88
Ingelstad	10.6	9,926	38.2	15.4	16.1	18.0	0.0	0.0	12.2	3,798	6,127	38.3	61.7	2,329
Järrestad	3.8	3,560	44.3	15.8	17.1	17.3	0.0	0.2	5.3	1,582	1,978	44.4	55.6	396
Kristianstad	6.2	5,775	41.9	35.7	1.1	17.4	0.0	2.4	1.6	2,554	3,219	44.2	55.7	665
Norra Åsbo	11.7	10,942	36.7	19.9	34.9	7.0	0.0	0.5	1.0	4,069	6,873	37.2	62.8	2,804
Simrishamn	1.2	1,144	44.7	42.0	0.1	10.5	0.0	2.0	0.7	534	610	46.7	53.3	76
Södra Åsbo	6.9	6,459	43.9	16.7	32.1	4.1	0.1	2.9	0.2	3,030	3,428	46.9	53.1	398
Villand	9.6	8,958	50.5	16.3	13.8	14.4	0.2	4.8	0.0	4,969	3,989	55.5	44.5	980
Västra Göinge	14.8	13,859	31.3	17.1	32.2	17.9	0.2	0.7	0.7	4,467	9,392	32.2	67.8	4,925
Ängelholm	2.7	2,493	55.0	37.0	1.9	4.1	1.6	0.0	0.4	1,412	1,081	56.6	43.4	331
Östra Göinge	12.1	11,373	41.4	18.7	19.4	16.1	0.6	3.5	0.3	5,172	6,201	45.5	54.5	1,029
Postal vote	0.1	81								21	60			39
Total	3.8	93,689	39.9	20.0	21.8	14.7	0.2	1.7	2.2	39,136	54,548	41.8	58.2	15,412
Source: SCB

=== Kronoberg ===
Location	Share	Votes	S	AV	B	F	KP	K	L-vote	R-vote	Left	Right	Margin
Location	%		%	%	%	%	%	%			%	%	
Allbo	19.2	11,671	31.8	37.3	22.8	5.1	1.9	1.0	4,054	7,616	34.7	65.3	3,562
Kinnevald	9.9	6,040	24.8	46.1	24.1	2.0	1.2	1.9	1,682	4,358	27.8	72.2	2,676
Konga	19.3	11,701	34.6	31.8	22.5	3.7	1.7	5.6	4,906	6,795	41.9	58.1	1,889
Norrvidinge	5.3	3,195	26.2	33.6	33.3	5.0	0.8	1.1	898	2,297	28.1	71.9	1,399
Sunnerbo	23.5	14,293	24.5	30.3	33.5	8.6	1.3	1.8	3,950	10,342	27.6	72.4	6,392
Uppvidinge	16.4	9,987	38.5	20.8	24.0	5.0	4.1	7.6	5,013	4,974	50.2	49.8	39
Växjö	6.3	3,844	38.3	49.3	1.3	5.8	3.2	2.1	1,675	2,169	43.6	56.4	494
Postal vote	0.0	15							6	8			2
Total	2.4	60,746	31.2	33.3	24.8	5.4	2.0	3.3	22,184	38,559	36.5	63.5	16,375
Source: SCB

=== Malmöhus ===
==== Malmö area ====
The two liberal parties, the Free-minded National Association and the Liberal Party ran on a joint list and their respective results were only reported at an overall summary level.

Location	Share	Votes	S	AV	F	KP	K	L-vote	R-vote	Left	Right	Margin
Location	%		%	%	%	%	%			%	%	
Hälsingborg	22.8	25,220	52.3	34.3	6.5	5.1	0.9	14,693	10,295	58.3	40.8	4,398
Landskrona	8.2	9,048	65.5	26.8	4.9	1.9	0.8	6,177	2,867	68.3	31.7	3,310
Lund	11.5	12,662	53.2	36.6	8.9	0.2	0.6	6,839	5,763	54.0	45.5	1,076
Malmö	57.4	63,460	61.6	27.7	8.3	0.6	1.4	40,334	22,845	63.6	36.0	17,489
Postal vote	0.1	77						25	50			25
Total	4.4	110,467	58.8	30.2	7.7	1.7	1.1	68,068	41,820	61.6	37.9	26,248
Source: SCB

==== Malmöhus County ====
Location	Share	Votes	S	AV	B	F	KP	K	LP	L-vote	R-vote	Left	Right	Margin
Location	%		%	%	%	%	%	%	%			%	%	
Bara	8.1	9,985	60.5	13.3	22.4	0.9	0.3	0.4	1.7	6,108	3,834	61.2	38.4	2,274
Eslöv	2.3	2,834	55.6	30.0	3.4	3.1	0.6	0.0	7.4	1,593	1,241	56.2	43.8	352
Frosta	8.4	10,285	29.9	11.8	31.7	2.9	0.7	0.0	21.9	3,154	7,033	30.7	68.4	3,879
Färs	7.8	9,574	34.7	8.2	28.1	1.8	0.3	0.0	26.8	3,350	6,213	35.0	64.9	2,863
Harjager	4.9	6,015	47.8	12.2	34.9	1.2	1.7	0.2	1.8	2,992	3,018	49.7	50.2	26
Herrestad	2.4	2,960	55.8	5.6	21.6	1.0	0.5	0.0	15.3	1,667	1,289	56.3	43.5	378
Ljunit	2.1	2,567	46.5	5.4	35.6	1.9	0.3	0.0	10.2	1,200	1,364	46.7	53.1	164
Luggude	16.7	20,571	53.6	15.5	25.6	1.3	0.7	0.4	2.7	11,264	9,267	54.8	45.0	1,997
Onsjö	5.6	6,905	42.0	9.8	43.2	1.1	0.3	0.2	2.9	2,940	3,937	42.6	57.0	997
Oxie	8.2	10,022	61.6	8.7	24.9	2.1	1.2	0.4	1.0	6,339	3,673	63.3	36.6	2,666
Rönneberg	4.4	5,375	56.8	15.9	24.5	1.2	0.3	0.0	1.0	3,071	2,290	57.1	42.6	781
Skanör-Falsterbo	0.3	412	31.6	39.6	12.6	11.2	0.0	0.0	2.7	130	272	31.6	66.0	142
Skytt	5.1	6,292	44.8	11.1	37.8	1.8	1.9	0.5	2.0	2,972	3,316	47.2	52.7	344
Torna	7.8	9,546	46.8	9.1	38.3	1.2	0.7	0.1	2.7	4,541	4,909	47.6	51.4	368
Trälleborg	4.3	5,281	55.0	22.4	2.4	5.2	4.2	8.6	2.1	3,467	1,813	65.7	34.3	1,654
Vemmenhög	7.4	9,109	43.9	9.0	39.4	3.0	0.9	0.0	3.7	4,086	5,023	44.9	55.1	937
Ystad	4.2	5,121	60.8	23.6	0.0	4.3	3.4	0.2	7.3	3,300	1,802	64.4	35.2	1,498
Postal vote	0.1	86								18	65			47
Total	4.9	122,940	49.1	12.9	27.5	2.1	1.2	0.2	6.7	62,192	60,359	50.6	49.1	1,833
Source: SCB

=== Norrbotten ===
Location	Share	Votes	S	AV	B	F	KP	K	L-vote	R-vote	Left	Right	Margin
Location	%		%	%	%	%	%	%			%	%	
Arjeplog	1.1	712	12.2	31.3	1.4	11.1	0.0	44.0	400	312	56.2	43.8	88
Arvidsjaur	4.3	2,693	19.3	26.6	3.3	20.4	0.2	30.1	1,336	1,357	49.6	50.4	21
Boden	4.3	2,714	35.6	41.9	0.1	7.2	3.7	11.5	1,378	1,334	50.8	49.2	44
Gällivare	9.9	6,193	23.3	31.7	2.2	2.2	1.0	39.6	3,964	2,229	64.0	36.0	1,735
Haparanda	1.4	880	25.7	48.4	3.5	5.3	0.0	17.0	376	504	42.7	57.3	128
Jokkmokk	2.4	1,526	21.8	26.6	1.8	9.3	1.0	39.6	951	575	62.3	37.7	376
Jukkasjärvi	8.1	5,037	22.5	21.2	0.5	4.5	9.2	42.0	3,717	1,320	73.8	26.2	2,397
Karesuando	0.2	120	0.0	93.3	0.8	5.8	0.0	0.0	0	120	0.0	100.0	120
Luleå	6.9	4,318	35.5	38.8	0.5	4.8	0.2	20.1	2,413	1,905	55.9	44.1	508
Nederkalix	10.6	6,602	40.9	27.4	6.6	8.4	0.4	16.3	3,806	2,796	57.6	42.4	1,010
Nederluleå	7.4	4,647	19.3	30.8	18.1	14.9	0.0	16.9	1,681	2,966	36.2	63.8	1,285
Pajala	4.1	2,545	9.8	27.7	12.7	2.5	0.0	47.3	1,455	1,090	57.2	42.8	365
Piteå	2.0	1,273	45.4	42.1	0.8	4.1	0.1	7.1	670	603	52.6	47.4	67
Piteå-Älvsby	15.9	9,930	49.9	15.6	13.7	4.3	0.0	16.5	6,598	3,332	66.4	33.6	3,266
Råneå	4.8	2,989	23.5	25.3	9.5	14.4	0.0	27.3	1,519	1,470	50.8	49.2	49
Torneå	6.3	3,912	25.9	17.9	29.6	4.4	0.0	22.0	1,876	2,034	48.0	52.0	158
Överkalix	3.6	2,269	29.9	9.8	24.2	6.1	0.0	30.1	1,361	908	60.0	40.0	453
Överluleå	6.4	3,992	18.7	26.8	9.8	17.5	1.1	26.1	1,830	2,162	45.8	54.2	332
Postal vote	0.1	68							32	36			4
Total	2.5	62,420	30.0	26.5	9.1	7.7	1.2	25.4	35,363	27,053	56.7	43.3	8,310
Source: SCB

=== Skaraborg ===
Location	Share	Votes	S	AV	B	F	KP	K	L-vote	R-vote	Left	Right	Margin
Location	%		%	%	%	%	%	%			%	%	
Barne	5.2	5,270	14.1	38.7	33.2	13.5	0.1	0.5	772	4,498	14.6	85.4	3,726
Falköping	3.0	3,049	47.0	34.5	2.1	14.0	2.2	0.2	1,506	1,543	49.4	50.6	37
Frökind	1.0	1,017	9.9	38.2	46.8	4.6	0.5	0.0	106	911	10.4	89.6	805
Gudhem	4.3	4,338	32.2	23.4	32.3	10.3	0.9	0.9	1,477	2,861	34.0	66.0	1,384
Hjo	1.4	1,370	32.1	38.5	2.0	25.6	1.5	0.3	465	905	33.9	66.1	440
Kinne	4.8	4,855	31.2	17.1	18.9	25.4	5.0	2.5	1,877	2,978	38.7	61.3	1,101
Kinnefjärding	2.8	2,839	22.2	23.3	38.8	13.9	1.7	0.1	682	2,157	24.0	76.0	1,475
Kåkind	6.1	6,121	27.4	21.7	34.4	13.9	2.0	0.8	1,842	4,279	30.1	69.9	2,437
Kålland	4.7	4,714	19.3	31.5	23.0	24.4	1.3	0.1	979	3,724	20.8	79.0	2,745
Laske	2.5	2,515	15.9	32.1	39.5	11.7	0.6	0.2	420	2,095	16.7	83.3	1,675
Lidköping	3.8	3,876	45.7	29.3	0.3	11.7	9.4	3.5	2,273	1,600	58.6	41.3	673
Mariestad	2.8	2,849	46.2	32.6	0.3	12.4	4.5	4.0	1,556	1,292	54.6	45.3	264
Skara	2.7	2,735	34.9	36.9	2.4	18.7	6.8	0.4	1,151	1,584	42.1	57.9	433
Skåning	4.8	4,864	15.1	23.3	46.1	14.3	0.9	0.2	789	4,074	16.2	83.8	3,285
Skövde	4.6	4,648	40.6	39.6	3.5	10.4	3.5	2.4	2,160	2,486	46.5	53.5	326
Tidaholm	2.4	2,392	61.0	15.1	0.3	8.8	12.2	2.7	1,814	578	75.8	24.2	1,236
Vadsbo Norra	9.8	9,841	34.0	24.6	27.8	12.1	0.7	0.8	3,492	6,348	35.5	64.5	2,856
Vadsbo Södra	10.8	10,843	36.8	20.2	31.9	10.1	0.4	0.6	4,097	6,746	37.8	62.2	2,649
Valle	2.0	2,020	35.4	22.7	25.7	14.0	1.7	0.4	759	1,261	37.6	62.4	502
Vartofta	11.0	11,086	31.1	17.8	40.9	8.0	1.9	0.4	3,700	7,386	33.4	66.6	3,686
Vilske	2.5	2,547	14.6	32.2	45.2	7.6	0.3	0.2	384	2,163	15.1	84.9	1,779
Viste	4.5	4,541	14.7	40.1	28.6	14.3	0.6	1.7	769	3,772	16.9	83.1	3,003
Åse	2.3	2,303	28.2	23.2	36.2	10.9	0.7	0.7	683	1,620	29.7	70.3	937
Postal vote	0.0	44							12	32			20
Total	4.0	100,677	30.3	26.6	26.8	13.1	2.2	1.0	33,765	66,893	33.5	66.4	33,128
Source: SCB

=== Stockholm ===
==== Stockholm ====
Location	Share	Votes	S	AV	F	KP	K	LP	L-vote	R-vote	Left	Right	Margin
Location	%		%	%	%	%	%	%			%	%	
Stockholm	100.0	253,033	44.0	32.4	3.5	11.8	2.0	4.7	146,315	102,834	57.8	40.6	43,481
Total	10.1	253,033	44.1	32.4	3.5	11.8	2.0	4.7	146,315	102,834	57.8	40.6	43,481
Source: SCB

==== Stockholm County ====
Location	Share	Votes	S	AV	B	F	KP	K	LP	L-vote	R-vote	Left	Right	Margin
Location	%		%	%	%	%	%	%	%			%	%	
Bro-Vätö	1.3	1,413	27.3	33.4	24.5	7.6	4.8	0.0	0.2	454	928	32.1	65.7	474
Danderyd	12.8	14,001	50.4	23.1	1.1	5.5	13.2	1.9	4.2	9,170	4,750	65.5	33.9	4,420
Djursholm	2.6	2,830	30.7	56.2	0.2	5.6	1.8	0.4	5.0	932	1,898	32.9	67.1	966
Frösåker	4.2	4,627	29.9	19.1	33.0	6.9	9.1	1.2	0.6	1,861	2,761	40.2	59.7	900
Frötuna-Länna	2.2	2,461	23.2	34.8	29.3	9.7	0.9	0.0	0.3	594	1,823	24.1	74.1	1,229
Färentuna	2.5	2,794	47.9	11.6	29.1	3.4	5.9	0.6	1.1	1,522	1,263	54.5	45.2	259
Lidingö	4.4	4,846	34.0	41.6	0.0	6.5	12.3	1.0	4.4	2,294	2,550	47.3	52.6	256
Lyhundra	1.6	1,737	17.8	37.0	29.3	8.9	2.7	0.6	1.3	366	1,329	21.1	76.5	963
Långhundra	1.4	1,520	25.9	17.9	42.9	9.2	2.0	0.6	1.3	433	1,083	28.5	71.3	650
Norrtälje	2.3	2,528	40.6	38.7	1.5	11.5	2.4	1.6	0.8	1,129	1,327	44.7	52.5	198
Närdinghundra	3.0	3,285	34.4	15.9	30.8	9.8	7.5	0.4	0.6	1,392	1,875	42.4	57.1	483
Seminghundra	1.3	1,398	27.8	20.8	39.1	8.9	0.9	0.3	2.1	406	991	29.0	70.9	585
Sigtuna	0.4	490	37.3	49.2	0.4	2.9	4.7	0.4	4.5	208	279	42.4	56.9	71
Sjuhundra	1.9	2,046	46.0	23.6	13.6	11.5	1.1	2.4	1.2	1,013	1,020	49.5	49.9	7
Sollentuna	10.5	11,547	59.3	16.0	1.9	5.9	12.1	1.1	3.2	8,378	3,117	72.6	27.0	5,261
Sotholm	6.4	7,006	50.0	16.5	14.0	8.0	9.6	0.5	1.4	4,211	2,790	60.1	39.8	1,421
Sundbyberg	3.4	3,745	61.0	10.5	0.2	4.8	17.7	3.5	2.0	3,080	652	82.2	17.4	2,428
Svartlösa	12.9	14,163	53.0	21.9	2.5	4.3	13.4	2.2	2.5	9,710	4,424	68.6	31.2	5,286
Södertälje	6.2	6,819	50.5	26.3	0.4	5.6	14.8	0.6	1.7	4,500	2,317	66.0	34.0	2,183
Vallentuna	2.4	2,608	43.0	19.8	19.1	6.7	8.9	0.7	1.8	1,371	1,235	52.6	47.4	136
Vaxholm	1.0	1,086	41.4	29.5	11.0	5.7	5.6	1.0	4.6	522	552	48.1	50.8	30
Väddö-Häverö	3.4	3,739	30.5	23.0	19.4	6.0	16.0	1.7	0.5	1,803	1,825	48.2	48.8	22
Värmdö	3.3	3,678	54.6	21.7	6.0	8.0	7.5	0.5	1.5	2,307	1,366	62.7	37.1	941
Åker	2.0	2,185	38.5	15.7	30.1	10.3	2.2	1.6	1.6	922	1,258	42.2	57.6	336
Ärlinghundra	2.0	2,240	45.6	13.2	26.6	8.5	3.3	0.4	1.7	1,105	1,119	49.3	50.0	14
Öknebo	3.7	4,090	52.2	19.6	10.0	4.3	13.0	0.4	0.4	2,684	1,406	65.6	34.4	1,278
Öregrund	0.4	409	28.6	39.9	3.9	16.4	6.6	0.0	4.6	144	265	35.2	64.8	121
Östhammar	0.4	451	28.2	40.4	4.9	22.2	2.4	0.2	1.8	139	312	30.8	69.2	173
Postal vote	0.1	61								25	35			10
Total	4.4	109,803	45.7	23.2	10.4	6.6	10.1	1.2	1.9	62,675	46,550	57.1	42.4	16,125
Source:SCB

=== Södermanland ===
Location	Share	Votes	S	AV	B	F	KP	K	L-vote	R-vote	Left	Right	Margin
Location	%		%	%	%	%	%	%			%	%	
Daga	4.1	3,219	35.0	20.3	20.8	18.0	5.7	0.0	1,311	1,906	40.7	59.2	595
Eskilstuna	20.0	15,505	67.3	16.2	1.0	5.7	9.2	0.6	11,956	3,549	77.1	22.9	8,407
Hölebo	2.9	2,218	48.7	9.9	26.2	9.6	5.3	0.3	1,205	1,013	54.3	45.7	192
Jönåker	9.5	7,348	53.2	12.2	14.8	11.2	8.5	0.1	4,542	2,806	61.8	38.2	1,736
Katrineholm	4.5	3,497	61.6	19.0	0.4	15.9	3.2	0.0	2,266	1,231	64.8	35.2	1,035
Mariefred	0.9	693	43.9	30.7	2.0	22.2	1.2	0.0	312	381	45.0	55.0	69
Nyköping	6.3	4,913	48.2	27.4	0.5	11.1	12.4	0.4	2,996	1,917	61.0	39.0	1,079
Oppunda	16.9	13,088	49.6	11.1	14.0	22.4	2.9	0.0	6,872	6,216	52.5	47.5	656
Rönö	5.1	3,947	43.2	11.1	28.3	14.4	3.0	0.0	1,822	2,125	46.2	53.8	303
Selebo	3.2	2,468	48.9	21.6	18.1	6.7	4.6	0.0	1,322	1,146	53.6	46.4	176
Strängnäs	2.8	2,205	39.1	52.6	0.8	7.3	0.1	0.0	866	1,339	39.3	60.7	473
Torshälla	1.2	929	61.6	22.1	4.8	6.9	4.5	0.1	615	314	66.2	33.8	301
Trosa	0.5	392	33.2	51.5	0.0	14.3	1.0	0.0	134	258	34.2	65.8	124
Villåttinge	8.1	6,296	50.8	16.5	14.9	13.1	4.6	0.2	3,498	2,798	55.6	44.4	700
Västerrekarne	4.2	3,235	40.9	11.7	22.7	19.6	5.0	0.1	1,488	1,747	46.0	54.0	259
Åker	4.0	3,115	54.1	15.7	16.7	10.3	3.2	0.0	1,783	1,332	57.2	42.8	451
Österrekarne	5.8	4,520	50.7	15.1	15.2	15.5	3.1	0.3	2,449	2,071	54.2	45.8	378
Postal vote	0.0	22							10	12			2
Total	3.1	77,610	52.6	17.0	11.4	13.1	5.7	0.2	45,447	32,161	58.6	41.4	13,286
Source: SCB

=== Uppsala ===
The two liberal parties, the Free-minded National Association and the Liberal Party, ran on a joint list, although their respective totals were reported separately in the national results.

Location	Share	Votes	S	AV	B	F	KP	K	L-vote	R-vote	Left	Right	Margin
Location	%		%	%	%	%	%	%			%	%	
Bro	2.3	1,209	55.7	26.6	7.6	3.1	7.0	0.0	758	451	62.7	37.3	307
Bälinge	2.3	1,205	13.2	15.3	48.7	12.4	10.5	0.0	285	920	23.7	76.3	635
Enköping	4.5	2,383	45.8	33.9	2.6	10.6	6.5	0.6	1,261	1,122	52.9	47.1	139
Hagunda	2.9	1,542	27.2	18.9	35.7	11.8	6.2	0.3	519	1,023	33.7	66.3	504
Håbo	2.9	1,540	49.5	25.1	15.3	5.4	4.7	0.0	835	705	54.2	45.8	130
Lagunda	2.7	1,444	32.6	19.5	34.8	10.9	2.2	0.0	503	941	34.8	65.2	438
Norunda	3.6	1,943	26.1	13.4	22.5	22.2	15.6	0.1	813	1,130	41.8	58.2	317
Oland	14.4	7,695	31.7	10.9	19.5	23.0	14.5	0.5	3,586	4,109	46.6	53.4	523
Rasbo	2.4	1,256	36.1	18.2	23.3	16.6	5.8	0.0	527	729	42.0	58.0	202
Trögd	5.7	3,021	33.8	22.0	37.3	4.5	2.3	0.0	1,092	1,929	36.1	63.9	837
Ulleråker	4.7	2,503	42.9	16.4	11.1	12.7	16.8	0.1	1,499	1,004	59.9	40.1	495
Uppsala	24.9	13,321	40.8	33.7	0.5	13.5	11.4	0.1	6,968	6,352	52.3	47.7	616
Vaksala	3.2	1,723	36.1	17.2	20.0	8.5	17.9	0.2	935	788	54.3	45.7	147
Åsunda	3.3	1,789	27.1	17.3	47.9	4.8	2.9	0.1	537	1,252	30.0	70.0	715
Örbyhus	20.2	10,807	51.2	8.1	13.9	11.9	14.8	0.0	7,137	3,670	66.0	34.0	3,467
Postal vote	0.1	42							4	38			34
Total	2.1	53,423	39.6	20.0	15.8	13.2	11.3	0.1	27,259	26,163	51.0	49.0	1,096
Source: SCB

=== Värmland ===
The two liberal parties, the Free-minded National Association and the Liberal Party, ran on a joint list, with their separate results only being reported in the nationwide tallies for the constituency.

Location	Share	Votes	S	AV	B	F	KP	K	L-vote	R-vote	Left	Right	Margin
Location	%		%	%	%	%	%	%			%	%	
Arvika	3.0	3,221	37.7	21.6	0.2	19.2	12.9	5.2	1,798	1,324	55.8	41.1	474
Filipstad	2.1	2,249	39.1	31.5	0.0	16.0	3.3	4.0	1,044	1,068	46.4	47.5	24
Fryksdal Norra	6.7	7,219	30.9	19.0	23.7	19.6	2.4	0.5	2,433	4,495	33.7	62.3	2,062
Fryksdal Östra	4.4	4,798	37.4	19.1	7.0	11.5	15.0	5.5	2,782	1,804	58.0	37.6	978
Färnebo	7.1	7,726	63.8	9.4	1.5	8.8	10.8	5.0	6,152	1,522	79.6	19.7	4,630
Gillberg	4.7	5,121	41.8	16.3	14.0	17.8	7.5	0.3	2,537	2,461	49.5	48.1	76
Grums	4.2	4,534	56.1	9.6	13.1	9.2	9.2	2.0	3,052	1,448	67.3	31.9	1,604
Jösse	9.7	10,480	39.9	17.3	9.9	18.5	10.3	1.9	5,458	4,795	52.1	45.7	663
Karlstad	7.5	8,115	47.1	26.0	0.6	12.5	8.5	2.0	4,676	3,168	57.6	39.0	1,508
Karlstad Hundred	5.9	6,384	54.8	11.9	5.5	10.0	12.9	4.0	4,579	1,749	71.7	27.4	2,830
Kil	7.8	8,428	44.2	7.5	12.0	13.6	17.5	0.4	5,232	2,799	62.1	33.2	2,433
Kristinehamn	5.3	5,782	56.1	17.8	0.0	15.4	6.8	0.3	3,654	1,918	63.2	33.2	1,736
Nordmark	5.8	6,274	25.0	17.0	15.0	28.2	7.3	1.2	2,105	3,774	33.6	60.5	1,669
Nyed	2.3	2,467	40.0	21.6	10.4	17.1	4.4	1.8	1,140	1,211	46.2	49.1	71
Näs	5.2	5,613	31.1	16.5	27.0	11.5	9.1	1.1	2,313	3,085	41.2	55.0	772
Visnum	2.6	2,835	34.5	16.1	17.2	18.2	9.7	2.4	1,322	1,463	46.6	51.6	141
Väse	2.8	3,035	30.8	16.3	25.7	21.5	2.5	0.7	1,031	1,929	34.0	63.6	898
Älvdal Norra	7.7	8,286	53.7	8.4	1.8	7.8	22.0	5.7	6,754	1,498	81.5	18.1	5,256
Älvdal Östra	3.7	4,028	40.6	13.6	3.6	12.8	16.3	11.9	2,767	1,210	68.7	30.0	1,557
Ölme	1.5	1,659	42.0	18.9	10.5	22.1	3.3	0.1	752	856	45.3	51.6	104
Postal vote	0.0	31							19	11			8
Total	4.3	108,285	43.6	15.8	9.6	14.9	10.6	2.7	61,600	43,588	56.9	40.3	18,012
Source: SCB

=== Västerbotten ===
Location	Share	Votes	S	AV	B	F	KP	K	L-vote	R-vote	Left	Right	Margin
Location	%		%	%	%	%	%	%			%	%	
Burträsk	4.7	3,379	10.2	31.3	21.5	35.5	0.3	1.1	392	2,987	11.6	88.4	2,595
Degerfors	5.2	3,724	25.1	22.9	1.6	49.8	0.2	0.3	956	2,768	25.7	74.3	1,812
Lycksele	10.4	7,417	23.1	20.6	3.2	51.0	0.9	1.0	1,861	5,555	25.1	74.9	3,694
Nordmaling-Bjurholm	10.7	7,626	31.5	24.4	10.0	33.2	0.3	0.5	2,467	5,159	32.3	67.7	2,692
Norsjö-Malå	5.1	3,613	29.8	22.4	1.8	45.1	0.2	0.7	1,109	2,504	30.7	69.3	1,395
Nysätra	8.6	6,157	22.4	27.5	11.4	38.2	0.4	0.2	1,412	4,743	22.9	77.0	3,331
Skellefteå	3.0	2,134	33.5	45.2	0.0	15.4	0.0	5.9	840	1,293	39.4	60.6	453
Skellefteå ting	21.3	15,196	29.4	36.9	8.3	19.2	0.3	5.9	5,413	9,783	35.6	64.4	4,370
Umeå	6.1	4,323	34.7	38.9	0.1	23.5	0.6	2.3	1,622	2,701	37.5	62.5	1,079
Umeå ting	15.2	10,862	28.0	18.4	11.1	37.3	2.6	2.6	3,601	7,261	33.2	66.8	3,660
Vilhelmina	6.4	4,578	44.6	12.0	4.2	35.9	1.1	2.2	2,192	2,384	47.9	52.1	192
Åsele	3.2	2,310	36.1	13.1	2.3	47.6	0.3	0.6	854	1,456	37.0	63.0	602
Postal vote	0.1	44							24	20			4
Total	2.9	71,363	28.7	26.5	7.4	34.2	0.8	2.4	22,743	48,614	31.9	68.1	25,871
Source: SCB

=== Västernorrland ===
Location	Share	Votes	S	AV	B	F	KP	K	L-vote	R-vote	Left	Right	Margin
Location	%		%	%	%	%	%	%			%	%	
Boteå	5.7	5,994	53.1	13.0	15.0	3.1	10.2	5.6	4,133	1,861	69.0	31.0	2,272
Fjällsjö	4.3	4,539	52.3	14.5	18.4	2.0	2.0	10.8	2,957	1,582	65.1	34.9	1,375
Härnösand	4.3	4,507	34.4	46.0	0.3	9.8	3.7	5.9	1,981	2,526	44.0	56.0	545
Indal	2.1	2,246	51.5	11.5	16.1	16.7	3.7	0.4	1,250	996	55.7	44.3	254
Medelpad Västra	12.7	13,441	43.6	8.9	23.1	9.7	7.7	7.0	7,842	5,599	58.3	41.7	2,243
Njurunda	18.9	19,958	53.1	8.7	5.6	7.6	16.1	8.8	15,585	4,373	78.1	21.9	11,212
Ramsele-Resele	5.0	5,322	47.8	15.1	30.1	2.5	1.9	2.6	2,785	2,537	52.3	47.7	248
Sollefteå	1.1	1,178	36.2	55.0	2.8	4.8	0.1	1.0	440	738	37.4	62.6	298
Sollefteå ting	4.1	4,311	59.4	14.1	16.1	1.8	0.3	8.3	2,926	1,385	67.9	32.1	1,541
Sundsvall	6.7	7,013	37.6	45.6	0.5	10.4	4.2	1.7	3,055	3,955	43.6	56.4	900
Ångermanland Norra	15.7	16,512	39.2	18.6	17.5	20.2	0.9	3.6	7,210	9,302	43.7	56.3	2,092
Ångermanland Södra	17.5	18,464	47.0	12.0	16.4	8.0	6.2	10.5	11,744	6,720	63.6	36.4	5,024
Örnsköldsvik	1.8	1,912	33.8	42.9	0.7	19.2	0.3	3.1	711	1,201	37.2	62.8	490
Postal vote	0.1	58							31	27			4
Total	4.2	105,455	46.2	17.1	13.9	9.5	6.6	6.7	62,650	42,802	59.4	40.6	19,848
Source: SCB

=== Västmanland ===
Location	Share	Votes	S	AV	B	F	KP	K	L-vote	R-vote	Left	Right	Margin
Location	%		%	%	%	%	%	%			%	%	
Arboga	3.1	1,995	53.6	26.5	0.6	13.7	5.1	0.5	1,182	813	59.2	40.8	369
Gamla Norberg	10.8	6,944	58.2	14.7	5.0	7.5	13.7	1.0	5,060	1,884	72.9	27.1	3,176
Köping	4.3	2,764	47.9	25.5	7.7	11.8	5.4	1.7	1,520	1,244	55.0	45.0	276
Norrbo	4.1	2,618	56.7	6.5	25.9	9.9	0.8	0.2	1,512	1,106	57.8	42.2	406
Sala	4.8	3,103	44.4	28.4	2.6	12.2	8.2	4.1	1,761	1,342	56.8	43.2	419
Siende	3.1	2,013	60.4	9.8	15.1	9.5	4.6	0.6	1,320	693	65.6	34.4	627
Simtuna	5.7	3,697	32.4	18.3	29.0	14.7	2.8	2.8	1,403	2,294	37.9	62.1	891
Skinnskatteberg	3.7	2,374	53.4	11.5	6.3	6.8	11.7	10.4	1,791	583	75.4	24.6	1,208
Snevringe	13.0	8,392	61.0	8.4	13.4	7.3	6.0	4.0	5,954	2,438	70.9	29.1	3,516
Torstuna	3.0	1,903	27.4	23.7	23.2	12.1	8.7	4.9	781	1,122	41.0	59.0	341
Tuhundra	1.4	915	45.8	5.5	31.7	15.1	1.5	0.4	437	478	47.8	52.2	41
Vagnsbro	2.2	1,397	31.8	3.8	42.3	20.8	0.4	1.0	463	934	33.1	66.9	471
Våla	4.5	2,887	23.8	6.8	31.3	26.2	10.6	1.3	1,030	1,857	35.7	64.3	827
Västerås	19.8	12,773	58.5	22.9	0.9	9.8	6.2	1.7	8,474	4,299	66.3	33.7	4,175
Yttertjurbo	1.6	999	37.9	13.7	34.1	10.8	2.2	1.2	413	586	41.3	58.7	173
Åkerbo	11.1	7,170	48.9	11.3	19.3	11.7	7.2	1.6	4,132	3,038	57.6	42.4	1,094
Övertjurbo	3.8	2,440	24.5	10.2	50.8	11.8	0.9	1.7	660	1,774	27.0	72.7	1,114
Postal vote	0.0	23							14	9			5
Total	2.6	64,407	49.9	15.6	14.4	11.1	6.7	2.3	37,907	26,494	58.9	41.1	11,413
Source: SCB

=== Älvsborg ===
==== Älvsborg N ====
Location	Share	Votes	S	AV	B	F	KP	K	LP	L-vote	R-vote	Left	Right	Margin
Location	%		%	%	%	%	%	%	%			%	%	
Ale	8.3	5,700	42.1	16.6	31.9	4.9	0.0	1.2	2.4	2,472	3,182	43.4	55.8	710
Alingsås	4.5	3,076	46.1	29.6	0.3	15.2	3.2	0.1	4.5	1,519	1,524	49.4	49.5	5
Bjärke	2.7	1,844	21.4	25.8	20.8	26.8	2.5	1.7	1.8	395	1,447	21.4	78.5	1,052
Flundre	4.4	3,039	62.3	11.0	19.6	2.3	2.0	0.5	2.0	1,971	1,062	64.9	34.9	909
Gäsene	5.9	4,084	9.6	39.4	34.5	16.0	0.0	0.0	0.5	394	3,689	9.6	90.3	3,295
Kulling	9.1	6,269	21.9	25.6	23.8	24.7	0.1	0.1	3.2	1,389	4,846	22.2	77.3	3,457
Nordal	5.7	3,926	35.6	15.5	36.1	7.7	2.0	0.0	2.1	1,474	2,408	37.5	61.3	934
Sundal	7.1	4,917	10.2	22.7	61.5	3.1	0.2	0.0	1.4	508	4,359	10.3	88.7	3,851
Trollhättan	7.7	5,306	67.6	13.8	1.0	7.0	3.2	2.3	3.9	3,880	1,363	73.1	25.7	2,517
Tössbo	4.1	2,842	32.8	18.8	33.7	10.6	1.2	0.7	2.0	986	1,849	34.7	65.1	863
Valbo	6.0	4,155	25.5	28.7	39.1	2.6	0.5	0.0	3.0	1,080	3,047	26.0	73.3	1,967
Vedbo	11.2	7,719	36.9	14.5	25.7	13.3	3.5	2.3	3.4	3,295	4,394	42.7	56.9	1,099
Väne	7.1	4,919	53.0	14.6	19.4	6.8	2.5	1.7	1.8	2,815	2,091	57.2	42.5	724
Vänersborg	5.2	3,588	50.9	28.0	1.0	4.5	6.5	0.5	6.7	2,077	1,444	57.9	40.2	633
Vättle	6.4	4,430	48.8	17.4	16.2	11.2	1.1	0.4	3.0	2,228	2,120	50.3	47.9	108
Åmål	4.3	2,991	53.1	27.7	0.3	13.5	4.3	0.0	1.0	1,716	1,271	57.4	42.5	445
Postal vote	0.0	29								12	17			5
Total	2.8	68,834	38.4	21.1	23.9	10.4	1.9	0.8	2.8	28,211	40,113	41.0	58.3	11,902
Source: SCB

==== Älvsborg S ====
Location	Share	Votes	S	AV	B	F	KP	K	L-vote	R-vote	Left	Right	Margin
Location	%		%	%	%	%	%	%			%	%	
Bollebygd	4.2	2,418	27.8	48.6	17.2	3.3	0.5	2.4	745	1,670	30.8	69.1	925
Borås	26.3	15,077	43.7	37.7	0.9	8.6	7.1	1.2	7,836	7,118	52.0	47.2	718
Kind	21.0	12,055	22.1	34.1	34.0	9.0	0.7	0.0	2,749	9,295	22.8	77.1	6,546
Mark	24.4	14,007	31.4	41.6	19.8	3.0	2.3	1.6	4,929	9,017	35.2	64.4	4,088
Redväg	7.5	4,297	9.8	27.3	48.6	13.4	0.6	0.0	450	3,839	10.5	89.3	3,389
Ulricehamn	3.3	1,869	39.3	36.3	1.9	19.2	2.2	0.4	783	1,072	41.9	57.4	289
Veden	4.8	2,738	15.1	47.3	25.6	10.3	0.4	0.8	447	2,279	16.3	83.2	1,832
Ås	8.5	4,853	19.2	36.8	36.2	6.5	0.8	0.1	976	3,862	20.1	79.6	2,886
Postal vote	0.0	16							5	11			6
Total	2.3	57,330	29.4	37.9	20.9	7.7	2.8	0.9	18,920	38,163	33.0	66.6	19,243
Source: SCB

=== Örebro ===
Location	Share	Votes	S	AV	B	F	KP	K	L-vote	R-vote	Left	Right	Margin
Location	%		%	%	%	%	%	%			%	%	
Asker	4.2	3,697	33.6	12.4	19.1	32.6	1.8	0.0	1,309	2,369	35.4	64.1	1,060
Askersund	1.0	873	39.9	33.4	3.3	19.6	2.2	0.1	368	492	42.2	56.4	124
Edsberg	5.5	4,824	38.5	12.7	15.7	24.0	7.5	1.1	2,272	2,530	47.1	52.4	258
Fellingsbro	4.9	4,315	36.0	21.2	19.1	17.4	5.2	0.7	1,806	2,493	41.9	57.8	687
Glanshammar	2.8	2,499	27.9	16.8	24.0	29.7	1.4	0.0	730	1,764	29.2	70.6	1,034
Grimsten	3.6	3,169	51.2	6.7	11.9	18.9	8.1	2.7	1,965	1,188	62.0	37.5	777
Grythytte-Hällefors	4.1	3,620	49.4	6.9	1.4	8.4	33.1	0.7	3,012	606	83.2	16.7	2,406
Hardemo	1.0	900	25.0	19.0	28.8	23.4	0.8	2.6	255	641	28.3	71.2	386
Karlskoga	9.6	8,438	52.1	11.8	11.7	7.8	16.3	0.0	5,775	2,634	68.4	31.2	3,141
Kumla	9.9	8,737	47.7	18.4	6.7	22.5	2.0	2.4	4,556	4,155	52.1	47.6	401
Linde-Ramsberg	5.2	4,563	38.2	13.5	30.6	9.5	7.2	0.0	2,071	2,445	45.4	53.6	374
Lindesberg	1.8	1,564	33.5	34.0	2.5	20.3	8.8	0.3	666	888	42.6	56.8	222
Nora	1.3	1,174	28.7	39.4	0.6	15.7	14.2	0.4	509	654	43.4	55.7	145
Nora-Hjulsjö	4.3	3,806	47.8	14.5	13.0	13.0	10.9	0.5	2,254	1,539	59.2	40.4	715
Nya Kopparberg	3.7	3,267	57.0	15.4	6.7	7.9	10.7	0.9	2,240	977	68.6	29.9	1,263
Sköllersta	4.1	3,585	32.9	16.0	14.7	33.5	2.0	0.4	1,264	2,302	35.3	64.2	1,038
Sundbo	4.1	3,607	54.2	11.3	21.0	9.6	2.4	1.1	2,080	1,510	57.7	41.9	570
Örebro	18.4	16,234	51.0	22.6	0.1	15.9	6.7	2.9	9,486	6,272	58.4	38.6	3,214
Örebro Hundred	10.4	9,115	52.2	13.9	8.7	16.6	7.1	0.4	5,444	3,568	59.7	39.1	1,876
Postal vote	0.0	21							12	8			4
Total	3.5	88,008	45.9	16.5	10.7	17.1	8.0	0.8	48,074	39,035	54.6	44.4	9,039
Source: SCB

=== Östergötland ===
Location	Share	Votes	S	AV	B	F	KP	K	L-vote	R-vote	Left	Right	Margin
Location	%		%	%	%	%	%	%			%	%	
Aska	4.7	6,132	53.0	19.3	9.6	8.7	4.8	4.7	3,832	2,300	62.5	37.5	1,532
Bankekind	3.8	4,907	49.4	22.2	16.5	6.8	5.1	0.0	2,673	2,234	54.5	45.5	439
Björkekind	1.2	1,562	30.3	25.5	38.4	5.4	0.3	0.1	480	1,082	30.7	69.3	602
Boberg	2.6	3,380	36.7	24.3	17.5	12.2	2.5	6.7	1,554	1,826	46.0	54.0	272
Bråbo	1.8	2,387	63.4	20.2	4.6	6.0	5.3	0.4	1,651	736	69.2	30.8	915
Dal	1.4	1,785	41.0	20.4	25.0	4.6	8.6	0.4	892	892	50.0	50.0	0
Finspånga län	8.7	11,307	53.1	16.8	14.8	12.5	2.1	0.6	6,319	4,986	55.9	44.1	1,333
Gullberg	2.0	2,667	43.5	22.6	22.3	5.5	3.5	2.5	1,319	1,348	49.5	50.5	29
Göstring	4.8	6,182	36.3	24.2	18.8	8.9	10.0	1.9	2,976	3,206	48.1	51.9	230
Hammarkind	4.6	5,967	39.7	26.0	20.3	8.5	4.8	0.6	2,696	3,271	45.2	54.8	575
Hanekind	2.3	2,974	43.4	33.3	16.6	5.9	0.1	0.6	1,315	1,659	44.2	55.8	344
Kinda	5.3	6,879	35.5	30.8	20.9	11.0	1.6	0.0	2,557	4,317	37.2	62.8	1,760
Linköping	9.4	12,281	42.7	39.5	1.8	10.7	3.6	1.6	5,888	6,391	47.9	52.0	503
Lysing	2.9	3,817	27.4	28.1	30.5	12.4	1.3	0.3	1,106	2,711	29.0	71.0	1,605
Lösing	1.7	2,159	53.0	21.9	16.7	7.3	0.4	0.7	1,168	991	54.1	45.9	177
Memming	3.1	4,022	55.4	27.4	2.5	7.7	6.2	0.8	2,508	1,514	62.4	37.6	994
Mjölby	2.2	2,804	51.4	23.9	2.9	13.6	8.1	0.2	1,673	1,131	59.7	40.3	542
Motala	1.8	2,332	37.9	44.6	0.4	14.1	1.5	1.5	955	1,377	41.0	59.0	422
Norrköping	21.8	28,407	57.0	31.3	0.8	4.8	3.7	2.4	17,919	10,488	63.1	36.9	7,431
Skänninge	0.5	697	29.0	31.1	16.8	16.4	4.4	2.3	249	448	35.7	64.3	199
Skärkind	1.5	1,998	41.3	22.7	26.4	7.6	2.0	0.0	864	1,134	43.2	56.8	270
Söderköping	0.9	1,187	43.4	40.0	3.8	12.6	0.3	0.0	518	669	43.6	56.4	151
Vadstena	1.0	1,365	32.6	39.9	2.1	17.1	8.1	0.2	559	806	41.0	59.0	247
Valkebo	2.3	3,024	37.0	30.2	22.4	9.5	0.6	0.2	1,145	1,879	37.9	62.1	734
Vifolka	2.3	3,008	36.3	31.5	15.1	11.8	1.6	3.7	1,252	1,756	41.6	58.4	504
Ydre	2.4	3,147	34.4	20.0	23.9	21.7	0.0	0.0	1,081	2,066	34.4	65.6	985
Åkerbo	1.0	1,290	26.1	49.5	15.7	8.7	0.0	0.0	337	953	26.1	73.9	616
Östkind	1.8	2,379	31.2	29.1	32.2	7.1	0.2	0.2	752	1,627	31.6	68.4	875
Postal vote	0.0	58							16	42			26
Total	5.2	130,104	45.9	28.2	11.9	9.0	3.5	1.5	66,254	63,840	50.9	49.1	2,414
Source: SCB
