= Vagnhärad =

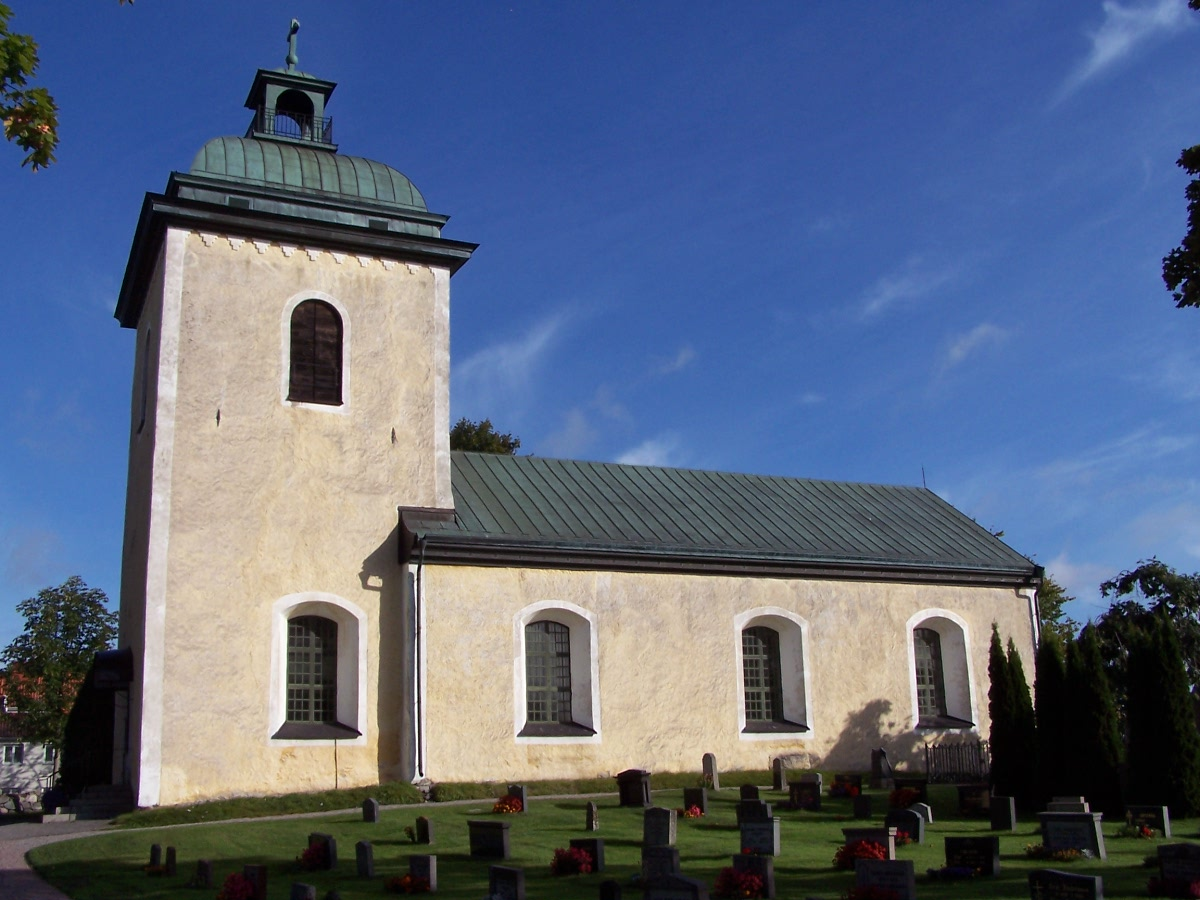
- Vagnhärad church

- Location within Södermanland Location within Sweden
- Coordinates: 58°57′N 17°31′E
- Country: Sweden
- Province: Södermanland
- County: Södermanland County
- Municipality: Trosa Municipality

Area
  - Total: 2.91 km^{2} (1.12 sq mi)

Population (31 December 2020)
  - Total: 3,976
  - Density: 1,370/km^{2} (3,540/sq mi)
- Time zone: UTC+1 (CET)
  - Summer (DST): UTC+2 (CEST)

Vagnhärad is a locality situated in Trosa Municipality, Södermanland County, Sweden with 3,976 inhabitants in 2020.

== Landslide ==
On 23 May 1997 a landslide along the banks of the Trosaån, or Trosa River, damaged or destroyed 7 residential houses. Only one person was injured but a total of 29 houses were demolished and 96 people lost their homes in the effort of preventing future slides in the area. The total cost of the slide has been calculated as approximately 150 million SEK.

During the summer of 2011 new cracks in the ground were found in the area around Brovägen, also alongside the river, threatening approximately 20 more buildings.

== Sports ==
Vagnhärad has 2 sports halls, Hedebyhallen and Lånestahallen, which are primarily used for school sports and by the floorball team Trosa Edanö IBK. There is also a Swimming pool, Safiren, and a soccer facility, Häradsvallen used by the team Vagnhärads SK.

== Education ==
Vagnhärad has two compulsory comprehensive schools, Fornbyskolan where students study from förskoleklass (grade 0) to grade 6 and Hedebyskolan, where most of the area's young people go to school for grades 7 to 9. Most students then continue their studies at upper secondary schools in Nyköping or Södertälje.

== Transportation ==
Vagnhärad is located along the highway European route E4 and along the railway Nyköpingsbanan, which is extended between Nyköping and Järna and gives Vagnhärad access by train to the cities of Stockholm, Södertälje, Nyköping, Norrköping and Linköping. Buses run to and from Södertälje, Nyköping, Trosa, Gnesta, Västerljung and Liljeholmen.

== Culture ==
The area around Vagnhärad is known for its many Stone Age burial mounds and archeological sites, as well as some old and unique runestones.

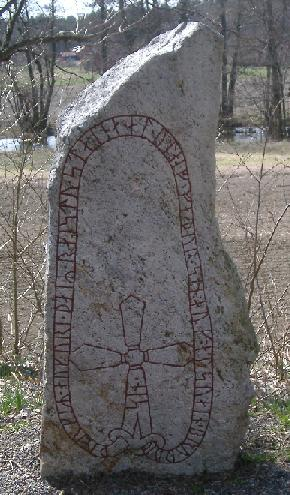

The locality was the model for "Hedeby" in Sven Delblanc's books Åminne (1970), Stenfågel (1973), Vinteride (1974) and Stadsporten (1976). The TV-series Hedebyborna, built on the books by Sven Delblanc, was mostly produced in the area around Vagnhärad.

A historic royal waiting hall that was used by the Swedish king Gustaf V during his summer visits to the royal palace of Tullgarn has been preserved, and is located next to the railway station.

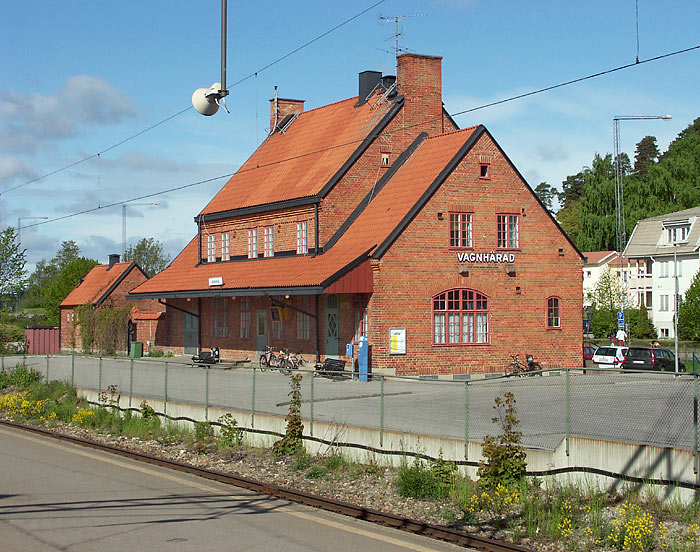
Vagnhärad Station
