= Trosaån =

Coordinates: 58°53′N 17°33′E

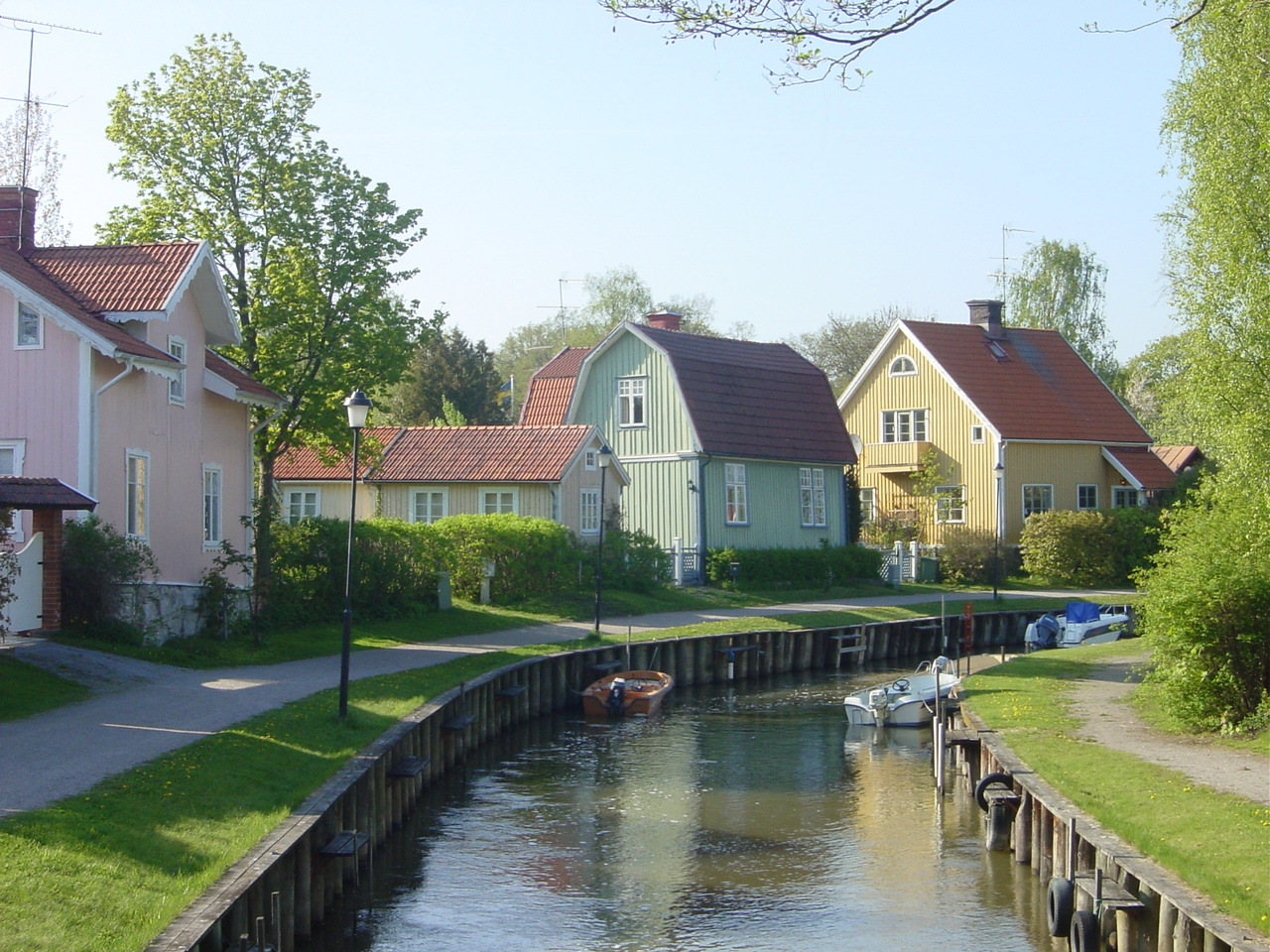
- Etymology: Swedish

Location
- Country: Sweden
- County: Södermanland County
- District: Trosa Municipality
- City: Vagnhärad, Trosa

Physical characteristics
- Source: Lake Sillen
  - location: Sweden
  - coordinates: 58.944N/17.426E
- Mouth: Baltic Sea
  - location: Södermanland, Sweden
  - coordinates: 58.892N/17.551E
- Basin size: 572.0 km^{2} (220.9 sq mi)

Trosaån is a river in Sweden. The river flows east from the south east of Lake Sillen in the Södermanland Region of Sweden. It flows along the path of the D 800 road through Vagnhärad where the river bend to the south along the 218 road. The Trosaån river splits the town of Trosa. where the river gets its name, in half. From there it empties out into the Baltic Sea. The river has small quaint houses on its banks in some parts, leading to spectacular pictures, and will freeze over in winter.
