= Camfil =

Swedish air filter company

Camfil.
- Type: Aktiebolag 100 % private ownership
- Industry: Air filtration
- Founded: Company founded 1963 in Trosa by Gösta Larson under the name Camfil AB
- Headquarters: Camfil AB, Stockholm, Sweden
- Area served: Worldwide
- Key people: Mark Simmons (CEO) since 2019, Jan Eric Larson (Chairman of the board) since 1983
- Revenue: $1 billion (2023)
- Number of employees: app. 5,700 (2024)
- Website: www.camfil.com

The Camfil Group is a producer and developer of air filters and clean air products. Camfil has 24 production units and R&D centres in four countries in the Americas, Europe and the Asia-Pacific region.

The Group, headquartered in Stockholm, Sweden, has approximately 5,700 employees and sales of around $1 billion. International markets account for more than 90 percent of sales. The company trades in four main segments: Air Pollution Control, Filtration Solutions, Power Systems and Molecular Contamination Control.

== History ==
The global Camfil Group started out as a family business in the town of Trosa, Sweden, located about 70 km (43 mi) south of Stockholm. Camfil was founded in Trosa in 1963 by the Larson family, still one of the company's principal owners, as a joint venture with Cambridge Filtration Corporation in the United States. In 1983, the family bought Cambridge's shares. Camfil was wholly owned by the family until 2000, when Ratos AB, a Swedish private equity company, received 29.7 percent of the shares in connection with the acquisition of Farr in the United States, which was then listed on NASDAQ. Ratos sold its shares in 2010 to the other owners, families Larson and Markman.
