= 1932 Swedish general election =

← 1928	17 September 1932	1936 →

All 230 seats in the Andra kammaren of the Riksdag
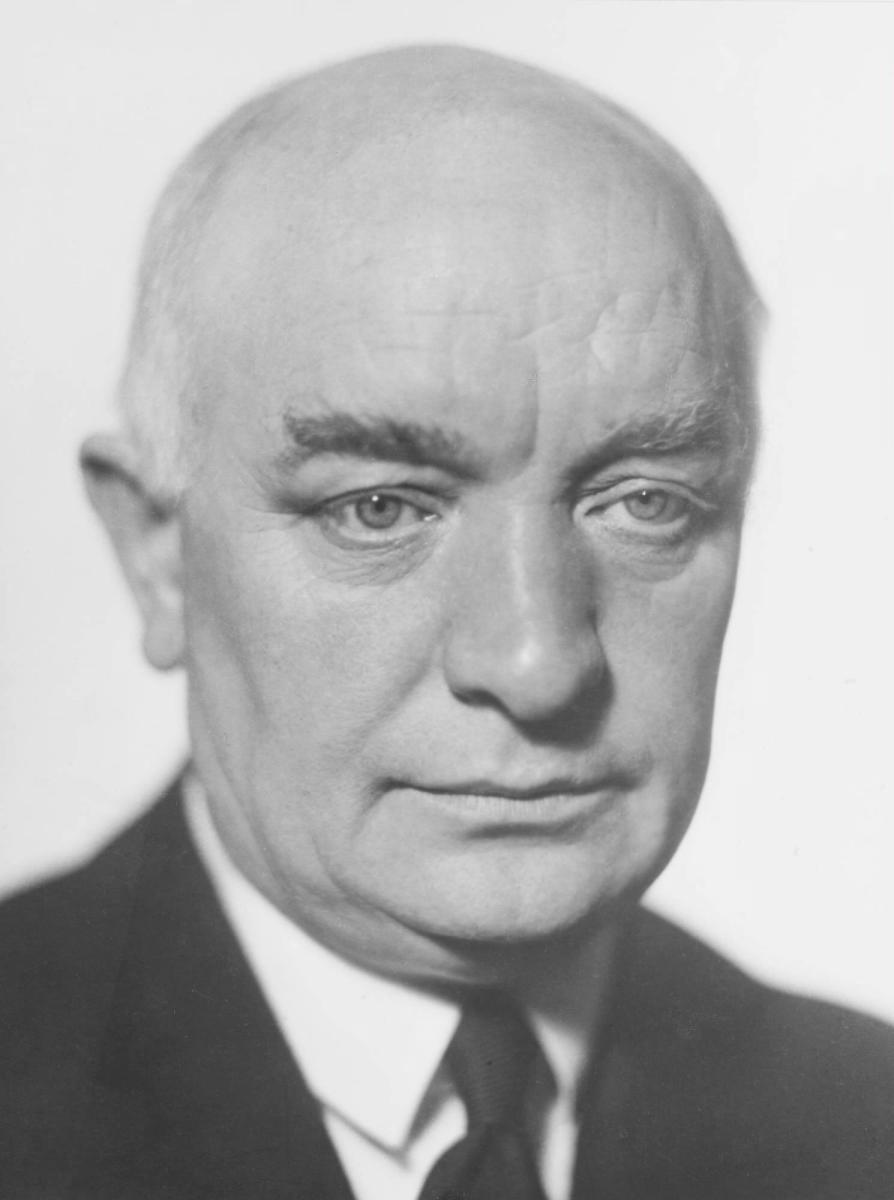

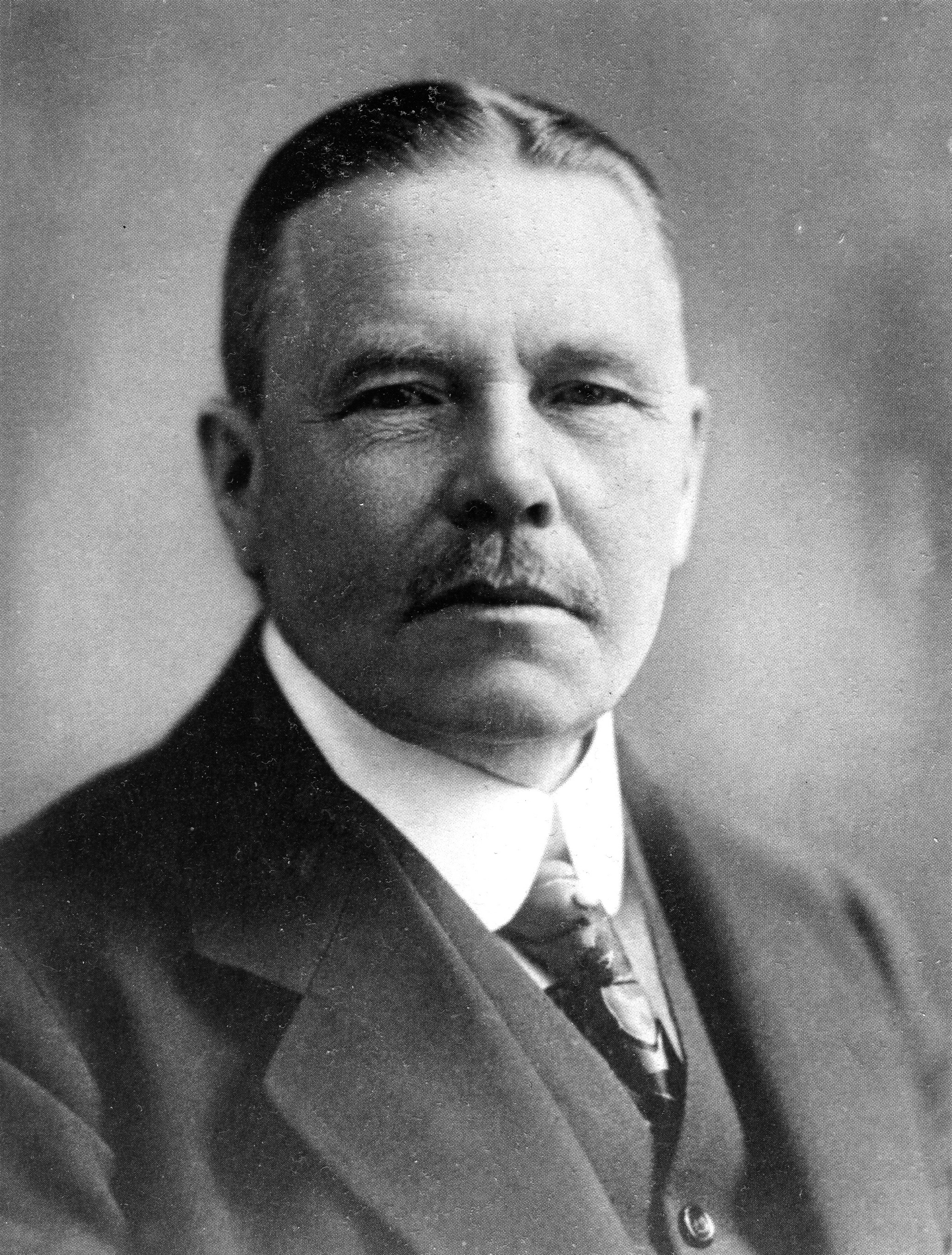

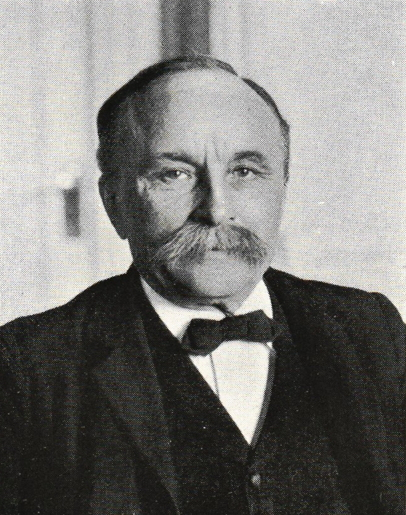

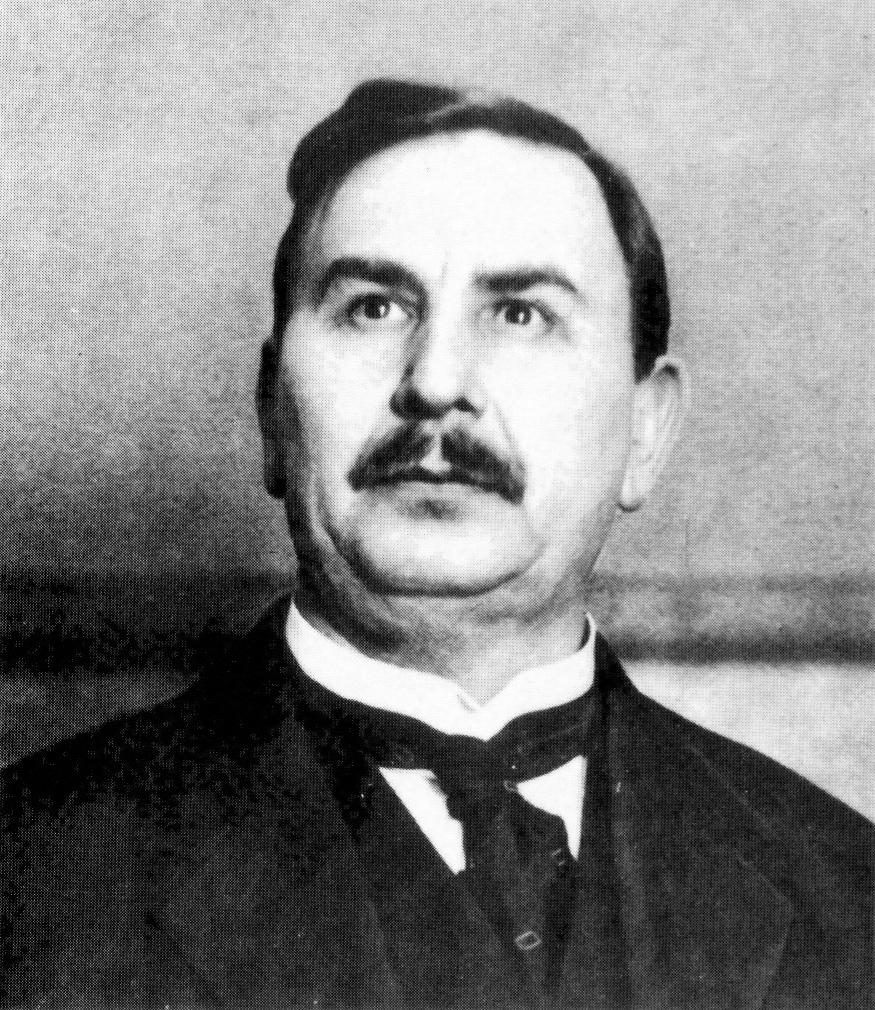

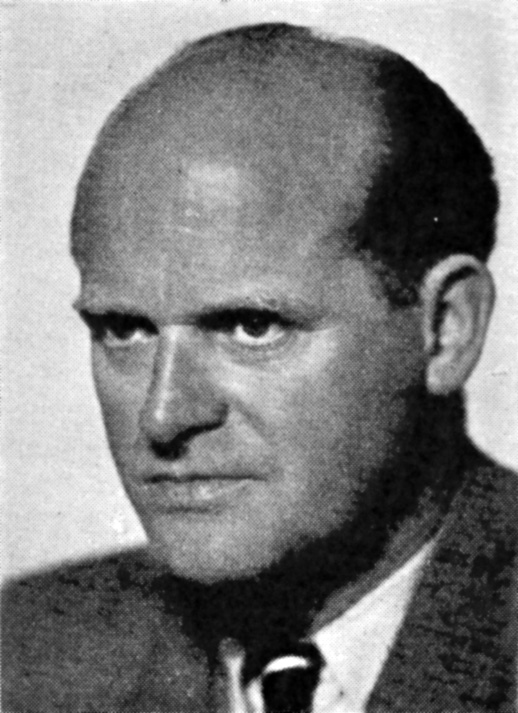

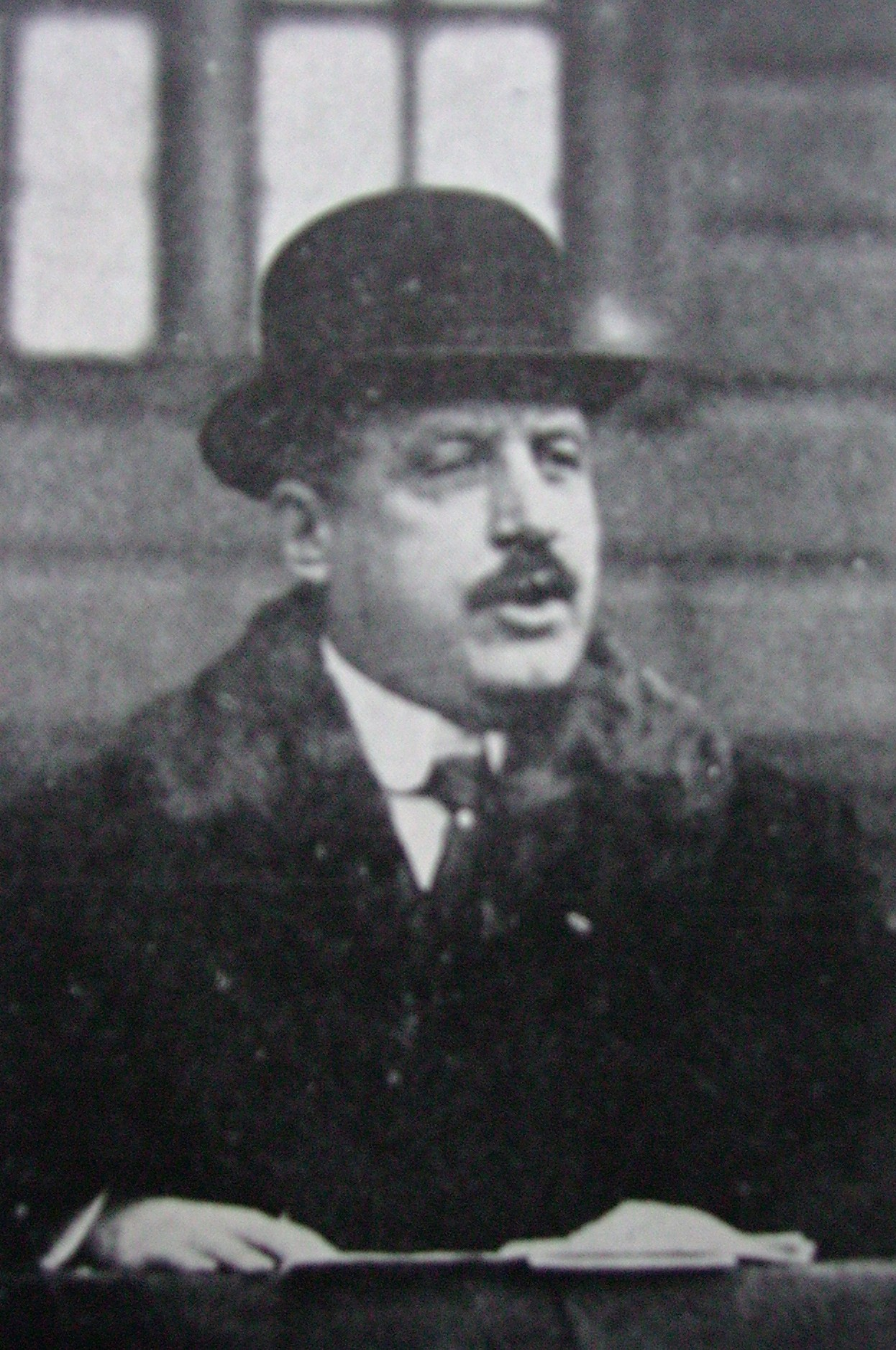

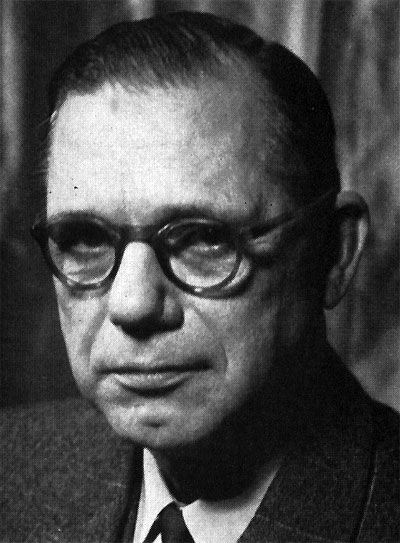
	First party	Second party	Third party
Leader	Per Albin Hansson	Arvid Lindman	Olof Olsson
Party	Social Democrats	Electoral League	Farmers' League
Last election	90	73	27
Seats won	104	58	36
Seat change	▲14	▼15	▲9
Popular vote	1,040,689	585,248	351,215
Percentage	41.71%	23.46%	14.08%
	Fourth party	Fifth party	Sixth party
Leader	Carl Gustaf Ekman	Nils Flyg	Eliel Löfgren
Party	Free-minded	Communist (Kilbommare)	Liberals
Last election	28	–	4
Seats won	20	6	4
Seat change	▼8	New	Steady
Popular vote	244,577	132,564	48,722
Percentage	9.80%	5.31%	1.95%
	Seventh party
Leader	Sven Linderot
Party	Communist (Sillénare)
Last election	8
Seats won	2
Seat change	▼6
Popular vote	74,245
Percentage	2.98%
- Largest bloc and seats won by constituency
Prime Minister before election
Felix Hamrin
Free-minded
PM-elect
Per Albin Hansson
Social Democrats

General elections were held in Sweden on 17 and 18 September 1932. The Swedish Social Democratic Party remained the largest party, winning 104 of the 230 seats in the Andra kammaren of the Riksdag. The party returned to government after six years in opposition, marking the beginning of 44 years of near-uninterrupted rule (the only exception was three months in 1936). This was also the first time the socialist parties received an overall majority of the elected parties' popular vote, although the Hansson cabinet still required cross-aisle co-operation to govern since the centre-right parties won 118 out of 230 seats.

== Results ==
The Clerical People's Party, albeit a separate party, received 8,911 votes or 0.4% of the vote share, but had the votes re-assigned to the General Electoral League as a result of them forfeiting their votes out of tactical purposes and were listed as Electoral League or "Rightist" votes in the official final results. No Clerical People's Party member got elected to the Riksdag, which meant the Electoral League covered the entire rightist delegation. Therefore the General Electoral League may correctly be attributed to both 23.1% and 23.5% of the overall vote share.

Party	Votes	%	Seats	+/–
Swedish Social Democratic Party	1,040,689	41.71	104	+14
General Electoral League	585,248	23.46	58	–15
Farmers' League	351,215	14.08	36	+9
Free-minded National Association	244,577	9.80	20	–8
Communist Party (Kilbommare)	132,564	5.31	6	New
Communist Party (Sillénare)	74,245	2.98	2	–6
Liberal Party	48,722	1.95	4	0
Swedish National Socialist Party	15,170	0.61	0	New
Centre Party	2,501	0.10	0	New
Other parties	175	0.01	0	0
Total	2,495,106	100.00	230	0
Valid votes	2,495,106	99.76		
Invalid/blank votes	6,060	0.24		
Total votes	2,501,166	100.00		
Registered voters/turnout	3,698,935	67.62		
Source: Nohlen & Stöver, SCB
