= Stensund och Krymla =

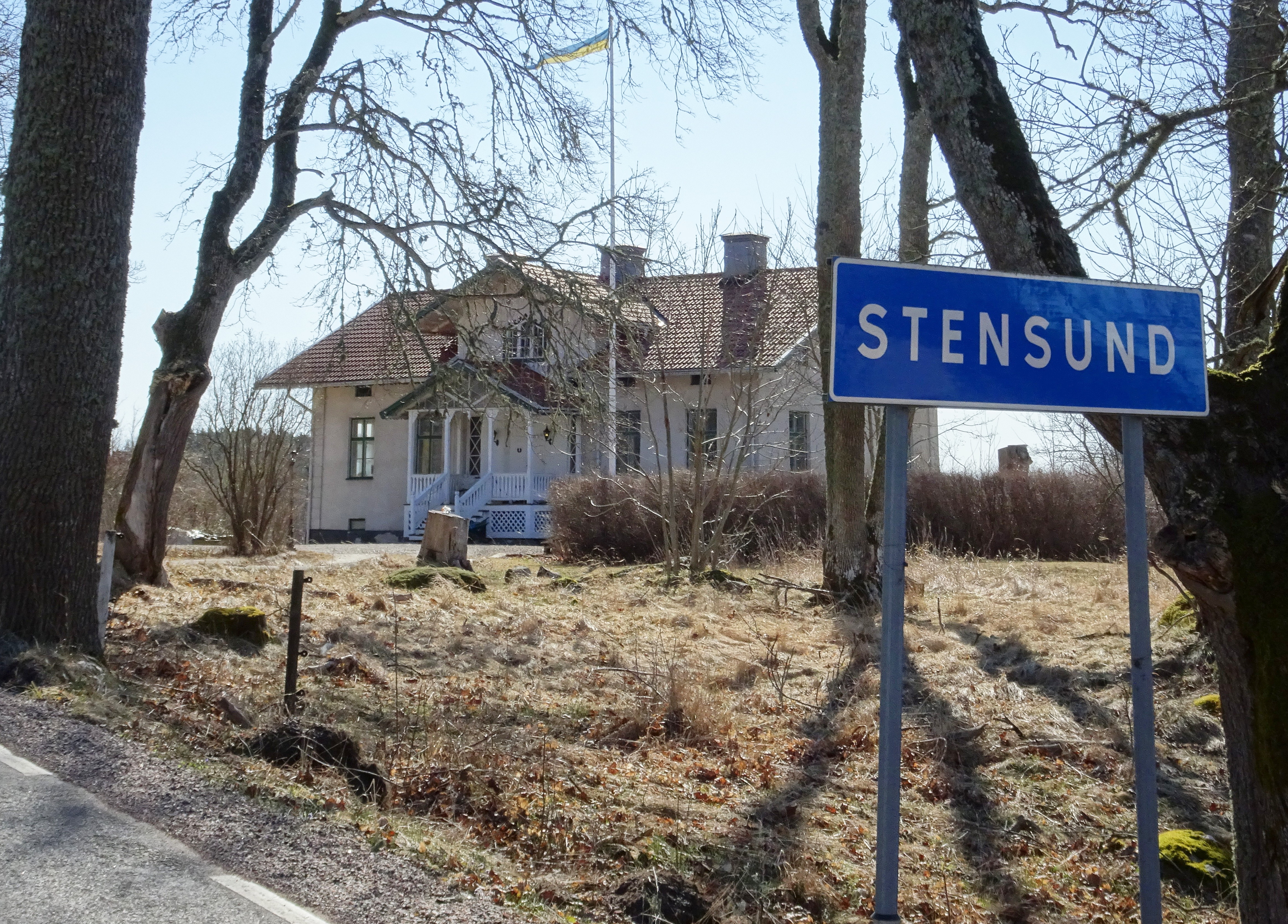

- Location within Södermanland Location within Sweden
- Coordinates: 58°54′N 17°36′E
- Country: Sweden
- Province: Södermanland
- County: Södermanland County
- Municipality: Trosa Municipality

Area
  - Total: 0.87 km^{2} (0.34 sq mi)

Population (31 December 2010)
  - Total: 346
  - Density: 399/km^{2} (1,030/sq mi)
- Time zone: UTC+1 (CET)
  - Summer (DST): UTC+2 (CEST)

Stensund och Krymla is a locality situated in Trosa Municipality, Södermanland County, Sweden. As of 2010, it had a population of 346.
