= Sund, Trosa =

Sund
- Location within Södermanland Location within Sweden
- Coordinates: 58°58′N 17°25′E
- Country: Sweden
- Province: Södermanland
- County: Södermanland County
- Municipality: Trosa Municipality

Area
  - Total: 1.15 km^{2} (0.44 sq mi)

Population (31 December 2010)
  - Total: 329
  - Density: 285/km^{2} (740/sq mi)
- Time zone: UTC+1 (CET)
  - Summer (DST): UTC+2 (CEST)

Sunden is a locality situated in Trosa Municipality, Södermanland County, Sweden with 329 inhabitants in 2010.

== Notable people ==
- Verner Lindberg, Finnish senator
