= Trosa Municipality =

Trosa Municipality Trosa kommun
- Municipality
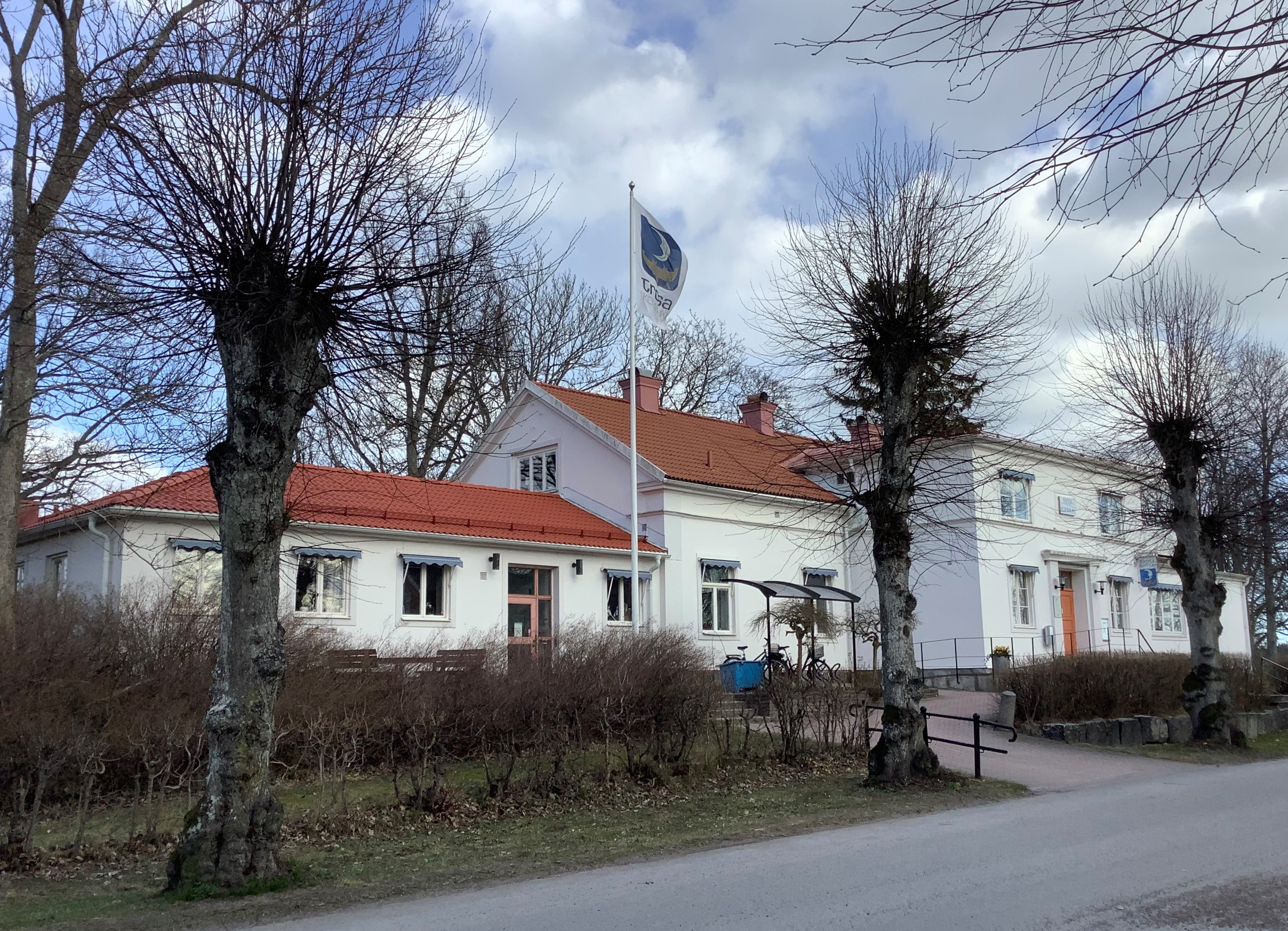
- Trosa town hall

- Coat of arms

- Coordinates: 58°54′N 17°33′E
- Country: Sweden
- County: Södermanland County
- Seat: Trosa

Area
  - Total: 664.76 km^{2} (256.67 sq mi)
  - Land: 209.73 km^{2} (80.98 sq mi)
  - Water: 455.03 km^{2} (175.69 sq mi)
- Area as of 1 January 2014.

Population (30 June 2025)
  - Total: 14,929
  - Density: 71.182/km^{2} (184.36/sq mi)
- Time zone: UTC+1 (CET)
  - Summer (DST): UTC+2 (CEST)
- ISO 3166 code: SE
- Province: Södermanland
- Municipal code: 0488
- Website: www.trosa.se

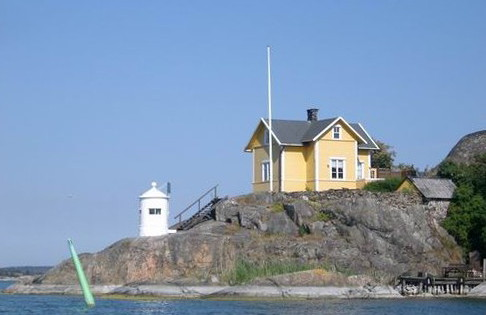
The Christmas Eve lighthouse in Trosa Archipelago

Trosa Municipality (Swedish: Trosa kommun) is a municipality in Södermanland County in southeast Sweden. The municipality consists of the localities of Vagnhärad, Västerljung, Stensund, Sund and the town of Trosa. The seat of the municipality is located in the town of Trosa.

The present municipality was created as recently as 1992, when Nyköping Municipality, which Trosa had been a part of since 1974, was split in three parts.

The municipality borders to Nyköping Municipality, Gnesta Municipality, and in the north to Södertälje Municipality in Stockholm County.

== Tourism ==
During the summer, the municipality sees its population of 14´000 (2021) increase fourfold. This is mostly due to people living in the Stockholm area that, during the summer, move to their holiday cottages in the municipality. Being close to Stockholm, the municipality is a favourite amongst tourists from abroad. The well-equipped harbour and Trosa's archipelago also attract many pleasure boats from both Sweden and the other countries bordering the Baltic Sea.

== Elections ==
The table below shows the results of the parliamentary (Riksdag) elections for Trosa municipality since the inaugural election under its current entity in 1991. For the period 1991 to 1998, the exact numbers of the Sweden Democrats were not published by the SCB due to the party's small size nationally.

=== Riksdag ===
Year	Turnout	Votes	V	S	MP	C	L	KD	M	SD	ND
1991	88.4	5,873	3.1	32.5	3.5	8.4	10.7	4.8	26.8	0.0	9.6
1994	89.1	6,225	4.6	41.8	5.8	6.7	8.6	3.4	26.3	0.0	0.8
1998	83.8	5,977	8.8	34.7	5.8	4.1	4.6	14.3	26.4	0.0	0.0
2002	83.1	6,218	5.5	40.9	5.3	5.1	13.3	9.3	19.0	0.6	0.0
2006	85.5	6,739	3.4	31.0	4.9	6.3	7.9	7.0	35.2	1.9	0.0
2010	87.9	7,487	3.5	23.5	7.4	5.2	7.0	5.4	41.3	5.8	0.0
2014	89.4	7,983	3.5	26.6	6.6	6.4	5.1	4.3	32.3	12.2	0.0

Political blocks

The table below lists the relative strength of the socialist and centre-right blocks since 1991. Parties not elected to the Riksdag are included in "others" such as the Sweden Democrats (results from 1988 to 2006) and the Greens (1991). The sources are identical to the table above. The coalition or government mandate marked in bold formed the government after the election. The New Democracy party got elected in 1991 but are still listed under "other" due to the short lifespan of the party.

Year	Turnout	Votes	Left	Right	SD	Other	Elected
1991	88.4	5,873	35.6	**50.7**	0.0	13.7	95.9
1994	89.1	6,225	**52.2**	45.0	0.0	2.8	97.2
1998	83.8	5,977	**49.3**	49.4	0.0	1.3	98.7
2002	83.1	6,218	**51.7**	46.7	0.0	1.6	98.4
2006	85.5	6,739	39.3	**56.4**	0.0	4.3	95.7
2010	87.9	7,487	34.4	**58.9**	5.8	0.9	99.1
2014	89.4	7,983	**36.7**	48.1	12.2	3.0	97.0

== Demographics ==
This is a demographic table based on Trosa Municipality's electoral districts in the 2022 Swedish general election sourced from SVT's election platform, in turn taken from SCB official statistics.

In total there were 14,653 residents, of whom 11,006 were Swedish citizens of voting age. 42.0% voted for the left coalition and 57.0% for the right coalition. Indicators are in percentage points except population totals and income.

Location	Residents	Citizen adults	Left vote	Right vote	Employed	Swedish parents	Foreign heritage	Income SEK	Degree
Location			%	%					
Trosa C	1,243	1,169	44.0	54.6	76	81	19	26,107	37
Trosa NV	1,288	995	43.1	55.3	88	89	11	30,338	49
Trosa N	1,662	1,223	38.7	60.1	85	80	20	28,512	40
Trosa SO	1,697	1,092	40.2	59.0	85	81	19	29,769	43
Trosa SV	1,054	914	45.8	53.7	85	90	10	28,857	45
Trosa S	1,244	1,025	35.8	63.9	86	92	8	32,927	45
Vagnhärad N	1,222	911	40.7	58.1	85	76	24	29,243	28
Vagnhärad S	1,440	1,038	43.8	55.3	88	79	21	30,313	37
Vagnhärad V	1,320	843	46.2	51.8	79	68	32	25,275	26
Vagnhärad Ö	1,318	942	43.2	56.5	82	68	32	25,722	24
Västerljung	1,165	854	42.7	56.1	84	85	15	28,851	34
Source: SVT
