= Centre Party (Sweden, 1924) =

Civilization Party election poster, 1924

The Centre Party (Swedish: Centerpartiet), initially called Civilization Party (Civilisationspartiet), was a political party in Örebro, Sweden. The party was founded in 1924 by Dr. Nils August Nilsson. Dr. Nilsson frequently used the slogan "First class humans in a first class society", arguing in favour of "social gynecology". A long-time peace advocate connected to the International Peace Bureau, Dr. Nilsson promoted world language (Ido) and world culture.

The Civilization Party contested the 1924 parliamentary election and the 1926 municipal election with ballots carrying the title 'Workers Party/Social Democrats' and the subtitle 'Civilization Party'. These ballots carried Dr. Nilsson as the first candidate, but with prominent Social Democrats filling up the rest of the ballot. The concerned Social Democrats protested against Dr. Nilsson's move, as he had put them on the ballot without their consent. The Civilization Party obtained 447 votes in the municipal elections in Örebro in 1926. The party was able to get one member elected to the municipal council. The Centre Party contested the 1932 parliamentary election under its new name.

In 1933 the Centre Party issued a party programme, with 'National Socialist connotations'. The party published Centerbladet from 1933 to 1940. Dr. Nilsson was the editor of the publication. After Dr. Nilsson's death in 1940, the abortionist Dr. Olofsson took over as editor of Centerbladet. However, only two more issues were published of the magazine.

In the summer of 1957, when the Farmers' League General Assembly sought to change its party name they opted for the name 'Centre Party'. However, it was discovered that the name had already been used by the Örebro grouplet. A delegation of the Farmers' League (including the national party secretary Gunnar Jonnergård) hastily travelled to Örebro to meet the registered representative of the seemingly defunct party to acquire the permission to take over the name.
