= Västerljung =

- Location within Södermanland Location within Sweden
- Coordinates: 58°55′N 17°26′E
- Country: Sweden
- Province: Södermanland
- County: Södermanland County
- Municipality: Trosa Municipality

Area
  - Total: 0.36 km^{2} (0.14 sq mi)

Population (31 December 2020)
  - Total: 388
  - Density: 1,100/km^{2} (2,800/sq mi)
- Time zone: UTC+1 (CET)
  - Summer (DST): UTC+2 (CEST)

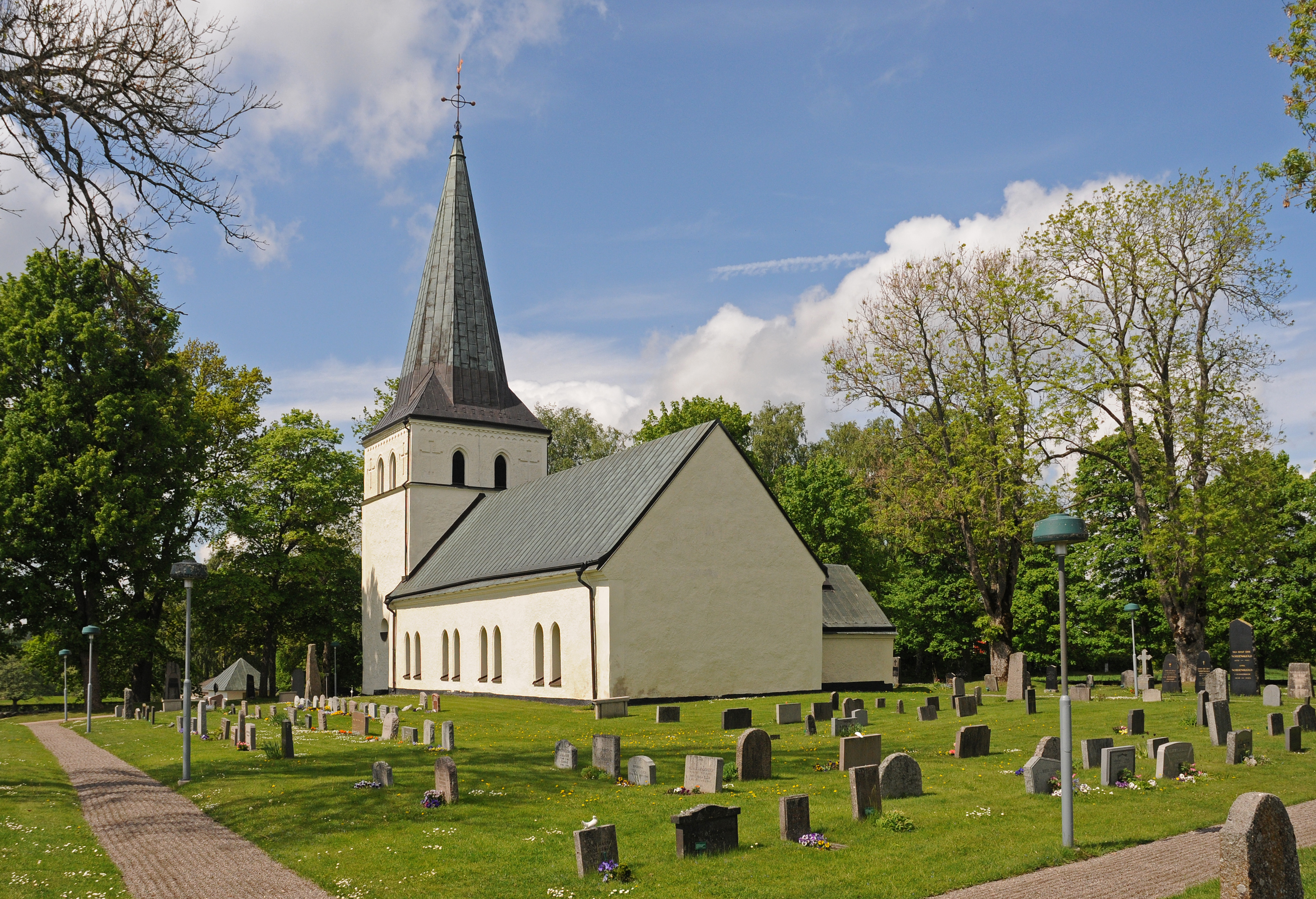
Västerljungs Church

Västerljung (Swedish pronunciation: [ˈvɛ̂sːtɛrˌjɵŋ]) is a locality situated in Trosa Municipality, Södermanland County, Sweden with 398 inhabitants in 2010.

There are two preschools and one school in Västerljung. The school is called Kyrkskolan (literal translation 'The church school') and was built in 1906. Right next to Kyrkskolan there is an old church called the Church of Västerljung, which was built as far back as in the 12th century, although the church has undergone significant architectural changes since then.

One event that took place at Kyrkskolan that was reported on by the Swedish Public Service News company SVT, was the encounter between the students of the school and a female capercaillie. The bird appeared on the schoolyard one day and immediately took interest in the kids' activities. It wasn't long before the capercaillie had gotten its name: Tjedda, and Tjedda quickly became an active participant in the daily life of the schoolchildren, joining in on soccer matches, climbing trees, and many other activities. Several attempts were made to bring the bird into the forest and set it free there, but Tjedda refused to be separated from the students so she kept coming back to the school multiple times.
