= Clerical People's Party =

1930–1936 Swedish pro-fascist party

Kyrkliga Folkpartiet (English: Clerical People's Party or Popular Party) was a minor pro-fascist party in Sweden founded in 1930. The party was formed and led by Ivar Rhedin, a priest in the Church of Sweden. Rhedin was the editor of Göteborgs Stiftstidning (Magazine of the Diocese of Gothenburg), in which he wrote many pro-German articles. The party was an ally of the main Nazi party in Sweden, National Socialist Workers Party. But the cooperation between the two parties did not last. Although both groups were staunch antisemites, their approaches toward the Jews were somewhat different. Rhedin, as a conservative Christian, was against the Jews as a religious community. NSAP were against the Jews as a race. Rhedin had no problem in accepting Jews who converted to Christianity, whereas NSAP and other Nazi groups considered that converted Jews continued to be Jews in racial aspects. The party was closed down in 1936.
