= Trosa =

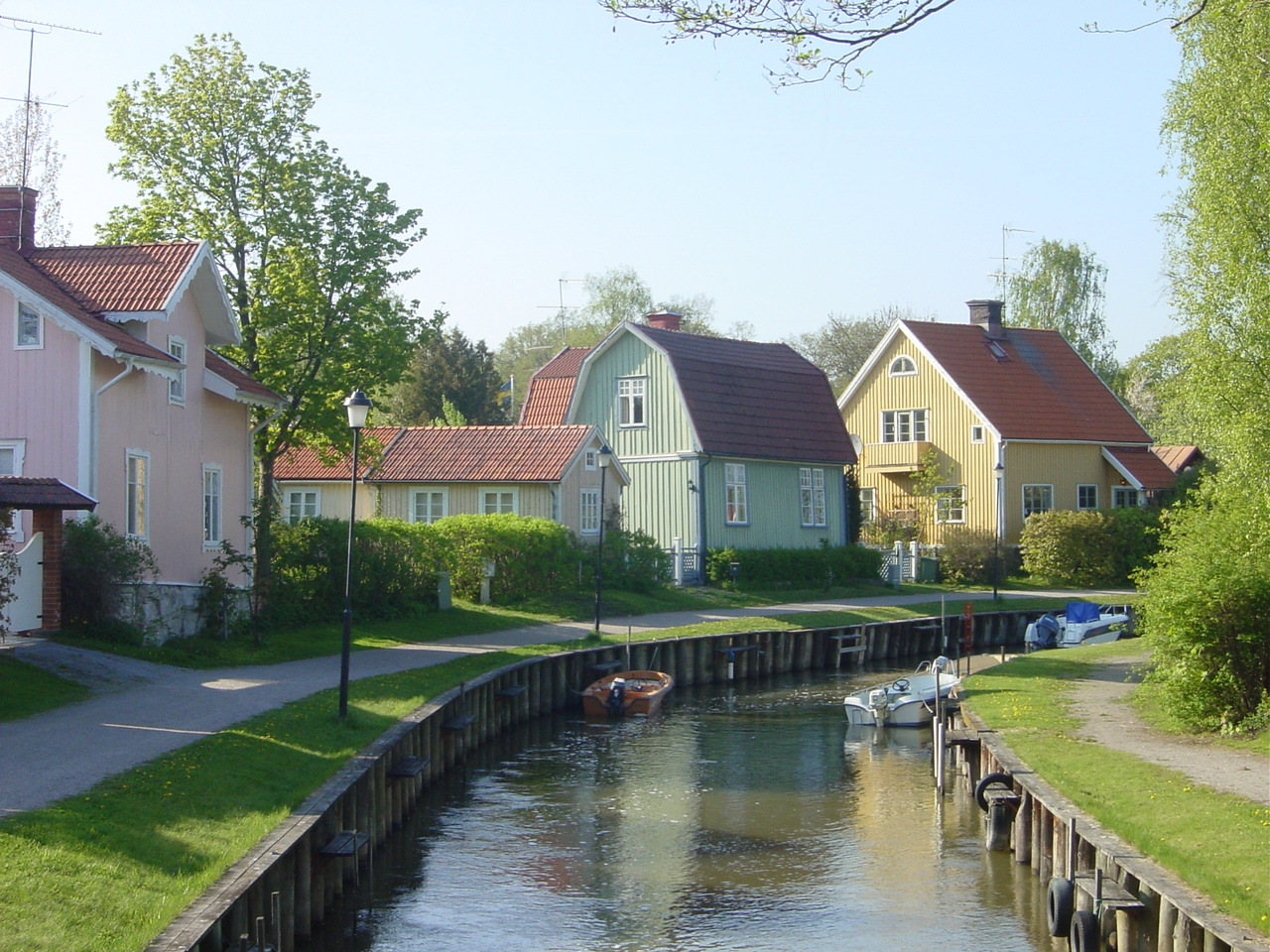
- Trosa with the Trosa River

- Coat of arms

- Location within Södermanland Location within Sweden
- Coordinates: 58°54′N 17°33′E
- Country: Sweden
- Province: Södermanland
- County: Södermanland County
- Municipality: Trosa Municipality

Area
  - Total: 3.60 km^{2} (1.39 sq mi)

Population (31 December 2020)
  - Total: 7,295
  - Density: 2,030/km^{2} (5,250/sq mi)
- Time zone: UTC+1 (CET)
  - Summer (DST): UTC+2 (CEST)

Trosa is a locality and the seat of Trosa Municipality, Södermanland County, Sweden with 5,027 inhabitants in the town of Trosa and 11,417 in the municipality as of 2010. The town is colloquially nicknamed Världens ände ("The World's end").

The municipality of Trosa consists of the three towns Trosa, Västerljung and Vagnhärad. Despite its small size, Trosa states its place in Sweden. It is the second fastest growing town in Sweden (2,9%/year 2008) and is ranked as having the 3rd best business climate in Sweden (2011).

== History ==
Trosa was known as a town in the 14th century.

In the 15th century it was an important site for trade, and received its city privileges in 1454 by King Charles VIII of Sweden (a.k.a. Karl Knutsson Bonde).

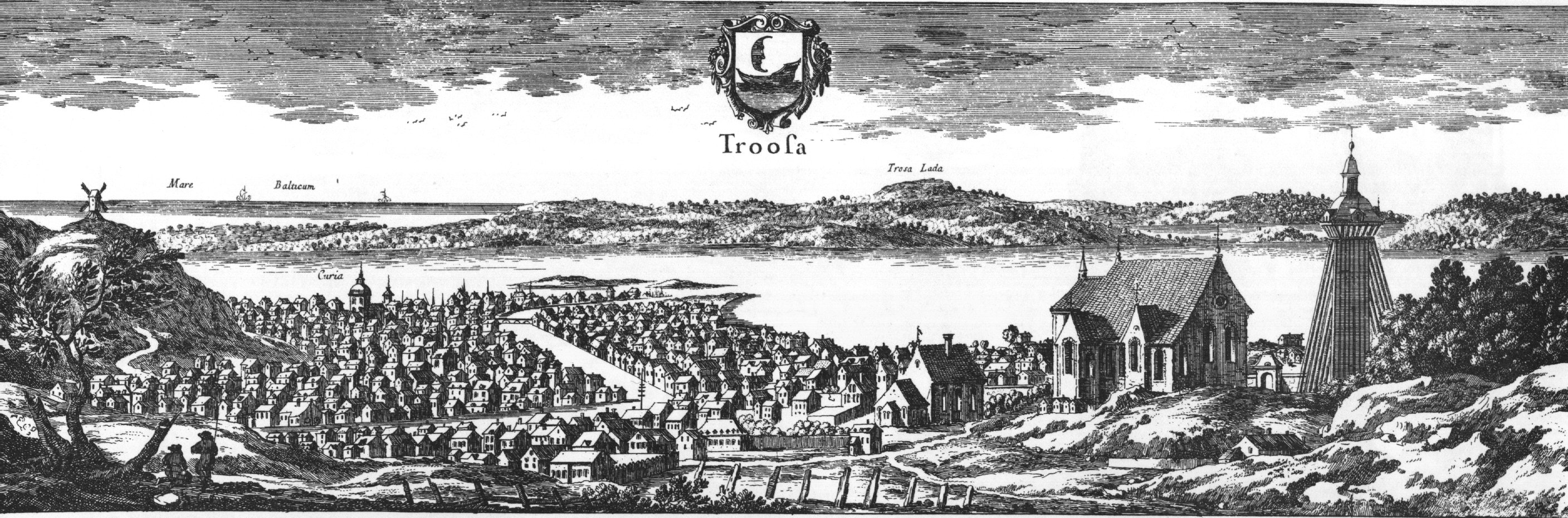
Trosa in the early 1660s, later printed in Suecia Antiqua et Hodierna

Due to post-glacial rebound, the city center was moved in the early 17th century, to its present location by the estuary of the Trosa River.

The city was burnt down and plundered by Russians in 1719 during the Russian Pillage of 1719-1721 and was repeatedly attacked during the Great Northern War, but the local church and poor-house was spared at every occasion. Both these buildings are now on display in the center of Trosa and serves as a memory from those hard times.

The economic base of the city was as earlier merchantmen and fishery. When the baltic fishery during the 1870s diminished in economic terms, the city opted for tourism as a business for the small coastal city.

=== 2000s ===
In 2010, Trosa celebrated 400 years as a town at its present location under the motto "Future since 1610".

The metalcore band Adept formed in the town in 2004.

== Demographics ==
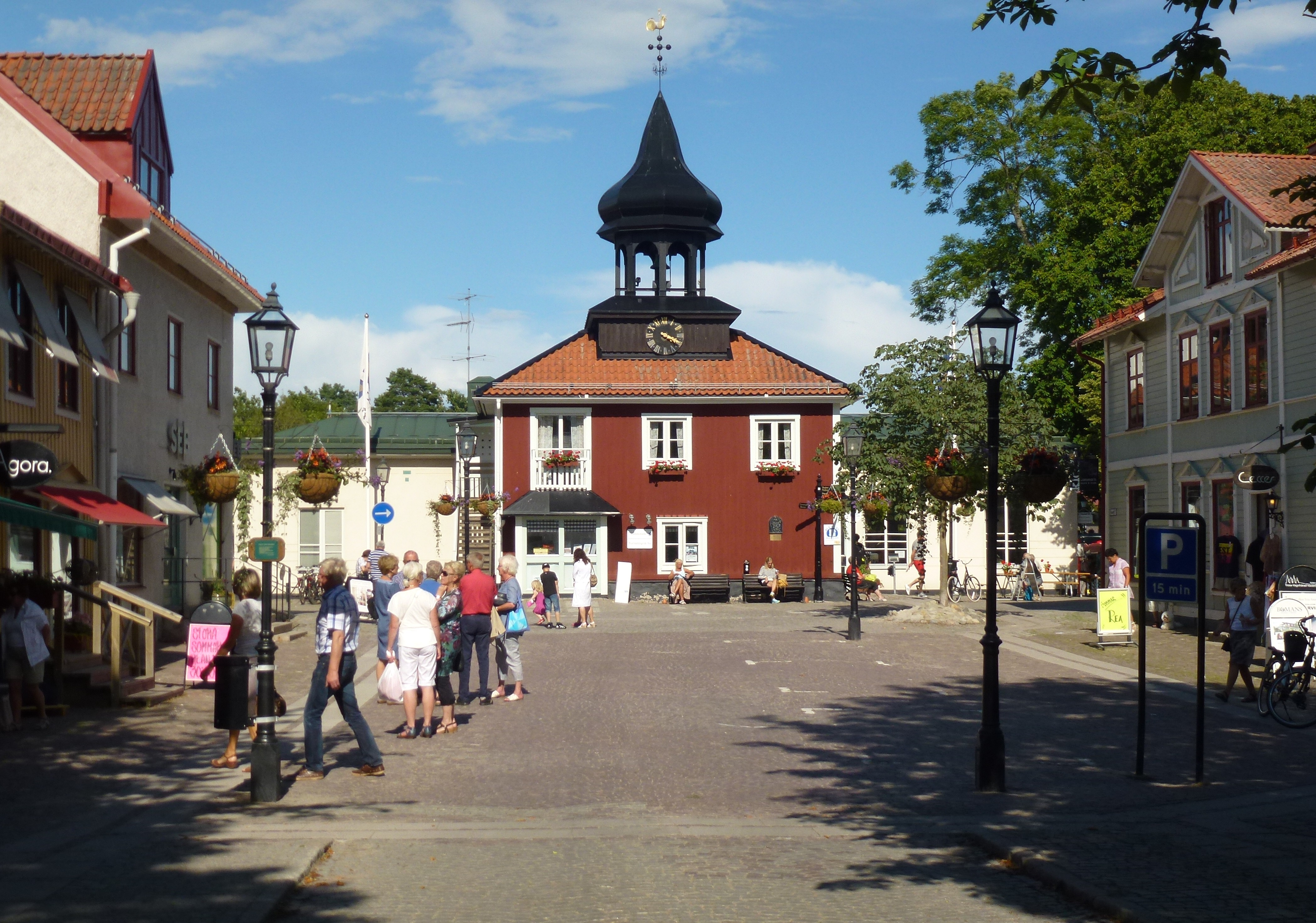
Trosa town center in 2012

Today Trosa is one of the top four wealthiest communities in Sweden (32% of the population earns more than 1,5 million SEK a year).

The general number of people living in Trosa goes up by 131% during the summer months of June–August because of the high ratio of summer residences. Trosa brings in a large number of tourists each year and the Board of Tourism in Södermanland estimates that a little less than 250,000 people from all over the world pass through the town each year.

== Notable residents ==
Many famous people have summerhouses in or close to Trosa, for example the well-known chef, hunter and actor Per Morberg as well as Tommy Körberg, the Swedish royal family, Mikael Persbrandt, ABBAs Benny Andersson and Björn Ulvaeus. The founder of Camfil Farr, Gösta Larsson, lived in Trosa all of his life and at the moment the Larsson-Markman family runs the company.

== Education ==
Within Trosa locality there are four elementary schools (grades 1–6), two junior high schools (grades 7–9). Right now there are no plans to build or house a high school or university/college within the municipality.
