= List of members of the lower house of the Riksdag =

This is an incomplete list of all people who served in the Andra kammaren of the Riksdag.

== A ==
Representative	Lifespan	Profession	Party	Years	Constituency
Fredrik Aarnseth	1872-1925	union representative	Social Democratic Party	1917-1921; 1922-1925	
Georg Åberg	1912–2002	fishery ombudsman	People's Party	1967–1970	Gothenburg and Bohus County
Erik Adamsson	1916–2004	expeditor	Social Democratic Party	1951–1970	Fyrstadskretsen
Nils Agerberg	1912–1996	agronomist	Rightist Party	1953–1960	Jämtland County
Johan Ågren	1910–1989	merchant	People's Party	1957–1960	Kopparberg County
Ernst Ahlberg	1891–1959	ombudsman	Rightist Party	1952–1958	Stockholm City
Per Ahlmark	1939–	B.A.	People's Party	1969–1970	Stockholm City
Jonas Ahlsten		farmer	People's Party	1957–1958	Gotland County
Hjalmar Åhman	1892–1960	yeoman, farmer	People's Party	1949–1960	Stockholm County
Allan Åkerlind	1928–1986	construction worker	Rightist Party	1965–1970	Stockholm County
Oskar Åkerström	1896–1964	sanding worker, wood pulp worker	Social Democratic Party	1937–1940; 1945–1960	Västerbotten County
Hildur Alvén	1886–1963	Teacher	Social Democratic Party	1937–1948	Kopparberg
Herman Andersson	1869–1938	mera	Farmers' League	1901–1938	

== B ==
Representative	Lifespan	Profession	Party	Years	Constituency
Blenda Björck	1885–1978	Maidservant, textile worker	Social Democratic Party	1937–1948	Tomelilla
Karl Björkänge	1895–1966	yeoman	Farmers' League	1949–1964	Örebro County
Gösta Bohman	1911–1997	manager	Rightist Party	1958–1969	City of Stockholm
David Boman	1888-1956	editor, prime minister	Farmers' League	1945-1952	Stockholm County
Hjalmar Branting	1860–1925	editor, prime minister	Social Democratic Party	1897–1925	City of Stockholm

== C ==
Representative	Lifespan	Profession	Party	Years	Constituency

== D ==
Representative	Lifespan	Profession	Party	Years	Constituency
Carl August Danielsson			Lantmanna Party	1901–1911	Östra Hundred, Jönköping County
Daniel Danielsson			Lantmanna Party	1867–1869	Östra Hundred, Jönköping County

== E ==
Representative	Lifespan	Profession	Party	Years	Constituency
Per Jonas Edberg	1878-1957		Centre Party	1918–1930; 1929–1932; 1945-	
Christina Ekberg	1874–1936		Social Democratic Party	1927–1928	City of Stockholm
Vira Eklund	1880–1967	school teacher	People's Party	1934–1936	Stockholm County

== F ==
Representative	Lifespan	Profession	Party	Years	Constituency

== G ==
Representative	Lifespan	Profession	Party	Years	Constituency
Ruth Gustafson	1881–1960	Editor, Union worker	Social Democratic Party	1933–1960	Stockholm City

== H ==
Representative	Lifespan	Profession	Party	Years	Constituency
Nils G. Hansson i Skegrie	1902–1981	farmer	Farmers' League	1945–1970	Malmöhus County
C.-H. Hermansson	1917–	party leader, editor-in-chief	Communist Party	1963–1970	City of Stockholm

== I ==
Representative	Lifespan	Profession	Party	Years	Constituency

== J ==
Representative	Lifespan	Profession	Party	Years	Constituency
Elsa Johansson	1888–1981	Senior administrative officer	Social Democratic Party	1936–1956	Östergötland County
Johan August Johansson			New Lantmanna Party independent Lantmanna Party	1888–1896	Östra Hundred, Jönköping County
Samuel Johnson			Lantmanna Party	1870–1887	Östra Hundred, Jönköping County

== K ==
Representative	Lifespan	Profession	Party	Years	Constituency

== L ==
Representative	Lifespan	Profession	Party	Years	Constituency

== M ==
Representative	Lifespan	Profession	Party	Years	Constituency

== N ==
Representative	Lifespan	Profession	Party	Years	Constituency
Olivia Nordgren	1880–1958	Typographer	Social Democratic Party	1925–1952	Malmöhus County

== O ==
Representative	Lifespan	Profession	Party	Years	Constituency
Märta Öberg	1895–1987	Industrial worker, cashier	Social Democratic Party	1938–1956	Gothenburg

== P ==
Representative	Lifespan	Profession	Party	Years	Constituency
Olof Palme	1927–1986	minister	Social Democratic Party	1969–1970	City of Stockholm

== Q ==
Representative	Lifespan	Profession	Party	Years	Constituency

== R ==
Representative	Lifespan	Profession	Party	Years	Constituency
Solveig Rönn-Christiansson	1902–1982	Trade unioner worker, janitor	Communist Party	1937–1958	City of Gothenburg

== S ==
Representative	Lifespan	Profession	Party	Years	Constituency
Per Olof Sundman	1922–1992	author	Centre Party	1969–1970	Stockholm County

== T ==
Representative	Lifespan	Profession	Party	Years	Constituency
Nelly Thüring	1875–1972	Typographer	Social Democratic Party	1921–1928	Gothenburg City

== U ==
Representative	Lifespan	Profession	Party	Years	Constituency

== V ==
Representative	Lifespan	Profession	Party	Years	Constituency

== W ==
Representative	Lifespan	Profession	Party	Years	Constituency
Bertha Wellin	1870–1951	Nurse	Rightist Party	1921–1935	City of Stockholm

== X ==
Representative	Lifespan	Profession	Party	Years	Constituency

== Y ==
Representative	Lifespan	Profession	Party	Years	Constituency

== Z ==
Representative	Lifespan	Profession	Party	Years	Constituency
Jonas Peter Zakrisson	1845–1931	manager	Lantmanna Party	1897–1900	Östra Hundred, Jönköping County
