= Boman (name) =

Boman is a given name and surname. Notable people with the name include:

== Given name ==
- Boman Aimé, Ivorian footballer
- Boman Irani (born 1959), Indian actor, producer, filmmaker, voice artist and photographer
- Boman Shroff, Actor
- Boman Martinez-Reid, Canadian video creator

== Surname ==
- André Boman (born 2001), Swedish footballer
- Alice Boman, Swedish singer-songwriter
- Arne Boman, Swedish ice hockey player
- Axel Boman (born 1979), Swedish DJ
- Daniel Boman, American politician
- David Boman (1888–1956), Swedish politician
- Eric Boman, Swedish-Argentine archaeologist
- Hans G. Boman (1924–2008), Swedish microbiologist
- Iwa Boman, Swedish actress and playwright
- Kalle Boman (born 1943), Swedish film producer
- Märta Boman (1902–1986), Swedish politician
- Mia Boman, Swedish female curler and coach
- Mikael Boman, Swedish footballer
- Mirko Boman, Croatian actor
- Scott Boman, American politician
- Sophia Boman (born 2002), American soccer player
