= Första kammaren =

Former upper house of the Swedish Riksdag (1866–1970)

First Chamber Första kammaren
- Coat of arms of Sweden

Type
- Type: Upper house

History
- Established: 22 June 1866
- Disbanded: 20 September 1970

Meeting place
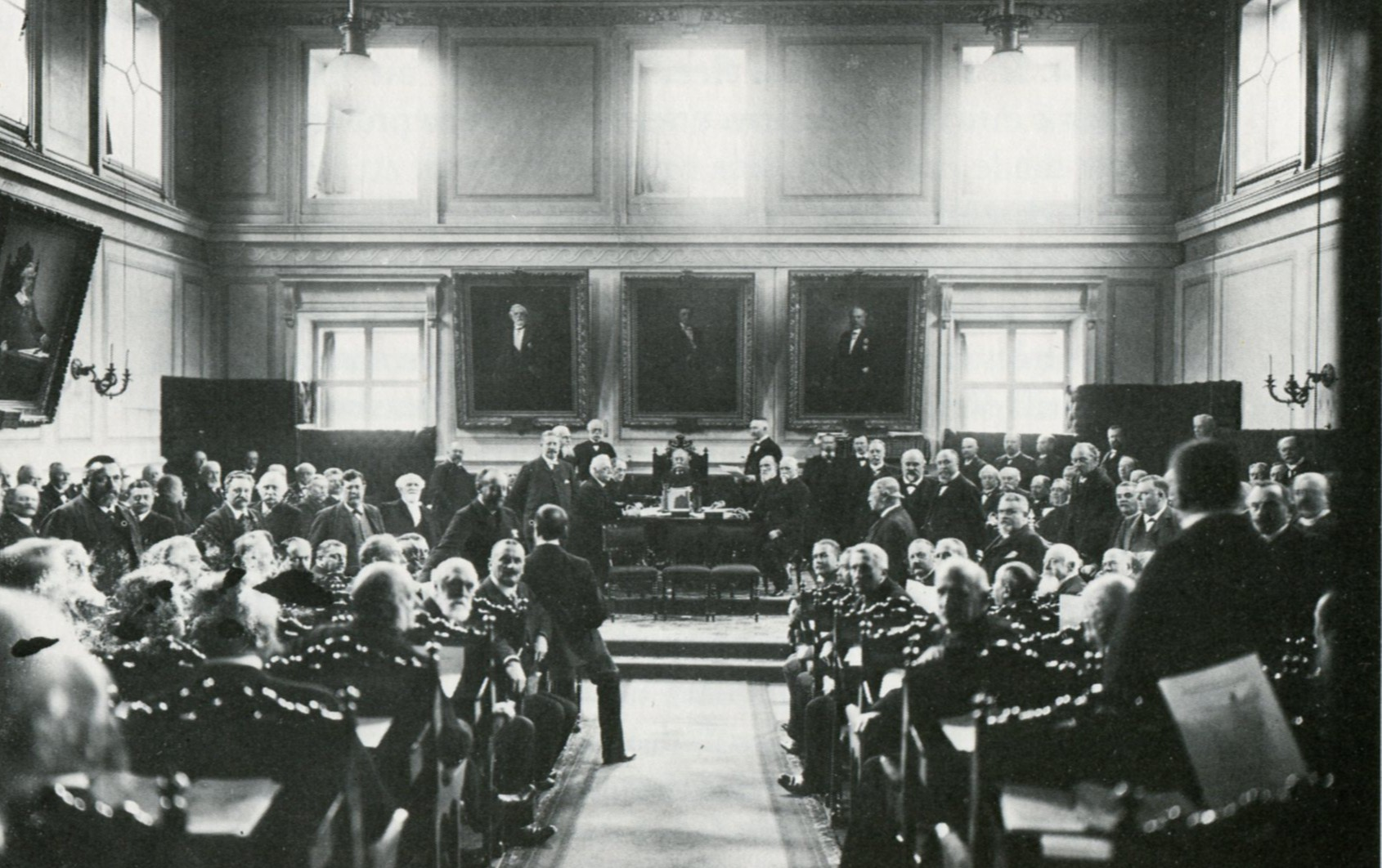
- Old Parliament House, Stockholm

The Första kammaren (lit. 'First Chamber', often abbreviated 'FK'; referred to in some non-Swedish sources as the Senate) was the upper house of the bicameral Riksdag of Sweden between 1866 and 1970 that replaced the Riksdag of the Estates. During the bicameral period, the lower house of the Riksdag was the Andra kammaren (lit. 'the Second Chamber'). Both chambers had generally similar and parallel powers.

At the time of its abolition, the First Chamber had 151 members. These were indirectly elected for eight-year terms of office, from amongst the county councils (landsting) and city councils (stadsfullmäktige), which formed electoral colleges. A portion of the county and municipal councils held parliamentary elections each year, thus staggering the terms of the members of the First Chamber. Local elections were held every four years in even years when elections to the Second Chamber were not due to be held.

During a large portion of the long tenure of power for the Social Democrats (between 1936 and 1976), the party remained in control of legislation thanks to its strong position in the First Chamber. If the two chambers made contradictory decisions in budgetary matters, they were required to meet in joint assembly to make a "coherent" decision on the issue. In other matters, no legislative outcomes could be established if the two houses were in disagreement, but issues could be re-addressed by submitting a new proposal. Co-ordination between the two chambers was facilitated by the Riksdag having standing joint committees composed of members from both chambers. This is rare for two-chamber systems, which generally only employ temporary joint mediation committees to resolve a dispute between the chambers, or reserve standing joint committees for very narrow functions.

== See also ==
- History of the Riksdag

== Literature ==
- Little encyclopaedia, publisher: Nordic AB, Malmö 1974, page 8, column 139 ff.
- Foreign political systems, Oxford University Press 1995, Rutger Lindahl (ed.)
