= Ebon Andersson i Malmö =

Swedish politician (1896–1981)

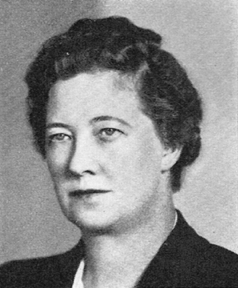
Ebon Olivia Bernhardina Andersson SPA3 (cropped)

Ebon Andersson i Malmö (1896-1981) was a Swedish politician (Swedish Social Democratic Party).

Andersson i Malmö was an MP of the Second Chamber of the Parliament of Sweden in 1941–1944.

Andersson i Malmö focused on the issue of spousal abuse and the access to better living accommodations for poor families.
