= Sigrid Gillner =

Swedish politician (1891–1975)

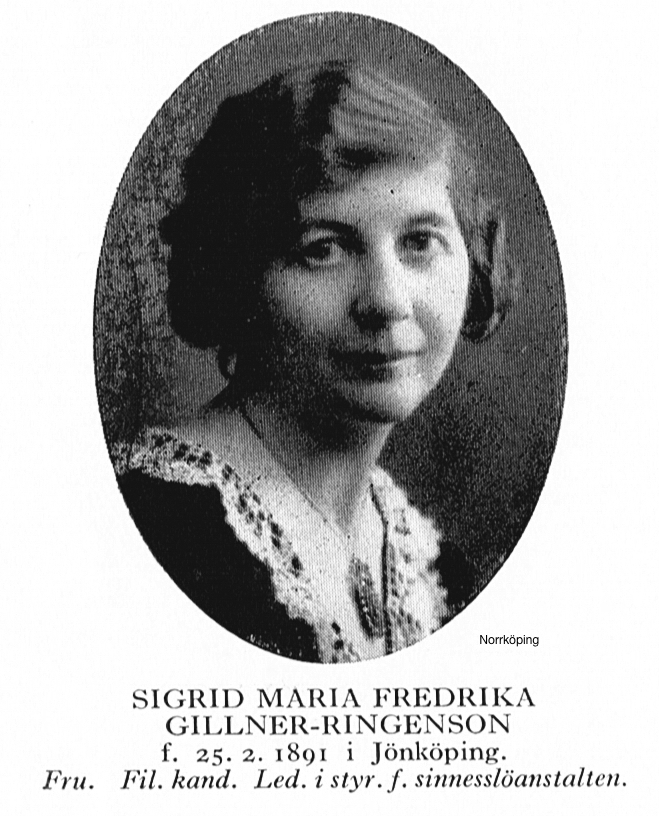
Sigrid Gillner

Sigrid Maria Fredrika Gillner-Ringenson (1891-1975) was a Swedish politician of the Social Democratic Party.

She was MP of the Second Chamber of the Parliament of Sweden from 1932 to 1936. In 1935, however, she left the Social Democratic Party and kept her seat as an independent for the term 1935-1936, attracting controversy as an admirer of Adolf Hitler.
