= Märta Boman =

Swedish politician (1902–1986)

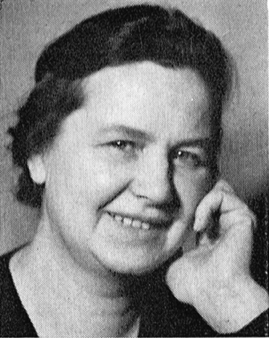
Märta Boman

Märta Kristina Boman née Lindau (1902–1986) was a Swedish politician who was the first woman to represent the Right Party (Högerpartiet) in the Norrbotten County constituency. She was elected as a member of the lower house of the Riksdag from 1945 to 1964. Representing a constituency in the far north of Sweden, she took an interest in the local Sámi peoples. Boman was also deputy chair of the Right Party's women's association Högerns kvinnoförbund and served on the party's executive committee.

== Early life and family ==
Born in Uppsala on 23 April 1902, Märta Lindau was the daughter of the tinsmith Axel Alred Lindau and his wife Emma Matilda née Lundin, a seamstress. She was the eldest of the family's six children. In 1922, she attended the Salvation Army school and trained as an officer. In 1940, she married the farmer Gustaf Alarik Boman (born 1996), with whom she had a son, Anders.

== Career ==
On becoming an officer in the Salvation Army in 1922, Märta Lindau was posted to Kiruna in the far north of Sweden where she was warmly welcomed and enjoyed working with the church and dealing with young people and social problems. She continued to work for the Salvation Army until 1939.

In 1940, she moved to Råneå, also in the far north, where she married the farmer Gustaf Boman. She had a busy time on their farm, taking care of his four children, their own son and a foster child. She nevertheless worked at the local telephone exchange and continued Salvation Army activities in the summer months by hosting meetings and services on their farm.

As a result of her husband's political interests, she attended a meeting of the Höger Party in Luleå. Soon afterwards she became a member of the party's women's group in Råneå and was elected president. Encouraged by her mother-in-law, she became increasingly active in politics, representing Högern on the Råneå municipal council and serving two terms as a member of the Norrbotten county council.

In 1943, the first woman to represent the Right Party (Högerpartiet) in the Norrbotten County constituency, Boman was elected to the lower house of the Riksdag. Proposing many motions in support of the inhabitants of the far north and taking a more general interest in welfare, care and peace, she remained an active member until her resignation in 1964.

Märta Kristina Boman died in Råneä on 28 December 1986.
