= Märta Öberg =

Swedish politician (1895–1987)

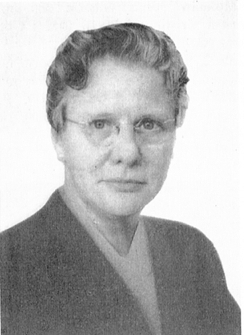
Märta Öberg 1895 SPA4 (cropped)

Märta Öberg (1895 - 4 October 1987) was a Swedish politician (Swedish Social Democratic Party). Öberg was an MP of the Second Chamber of the Parliament of Sweden for Gothenburg in 1938–1956.

She was born to the carpenter Ludvig Öberg and Alma Mattsson. She worked as a worker in the clothing industry, and as business assistant in a shop and as a cashier from 1932.

Öberg was Member of the Gothenburg City Council in 1935-1937 and an MP of the Second Chamber for Gothenburg in 1938-1956. She was a member of the central committee of the Social Democratic Women in Sweden as president of its Gothenburg branch in 1932–1956, as well as a member of the central committee of the Gothenburg branch of the Swedish Social Democratic Party in 1934–1944. She was a member of the government sobriety committee in 1944–1954 and the civil defense committee 1945–1948.
