= Christina Ekberg =

Swedish politician (1874–1936)

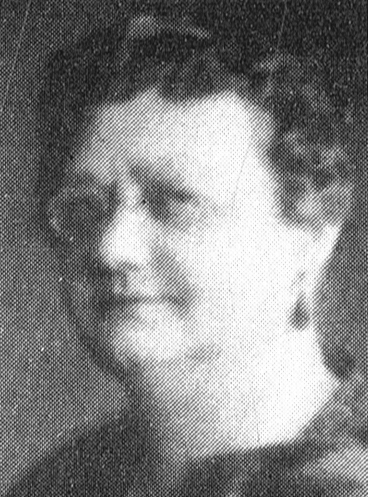
Christina Ekberg

Alfrida Christina Ekberg (1874–1936) was a Swedish politician (Swedish Social Democratic Party).

Christina Ekberg was an MP for Stockholm County of the Second Chamber of the Parliament of Sweden in 1927–1928.

Ekberg became a member of the Swedish Social Democratic Party in 1893. She was engaged in the women's movement via the local Social Democratic women's Club, the Stockholms Allmänna Kvinnoklubb, which was active in the campaign of women's suffrage in Sweden under the leadership of the Landsföreningen för kvinnans politiska rösträtt. She was active in local politics and had several political assignments in local Stockholm politics.

She became an MP in 1927 in place of the Social Democrat Sven Johan Karlsson, who resigned from office in the middle of his tenure, and remained as MP until the end of term in 1928.
