= Strömparterren =

Park on Helgeandsholmen, Stockholm, Sweden

Coordinates: 59°19′42″N 18°04′14″E

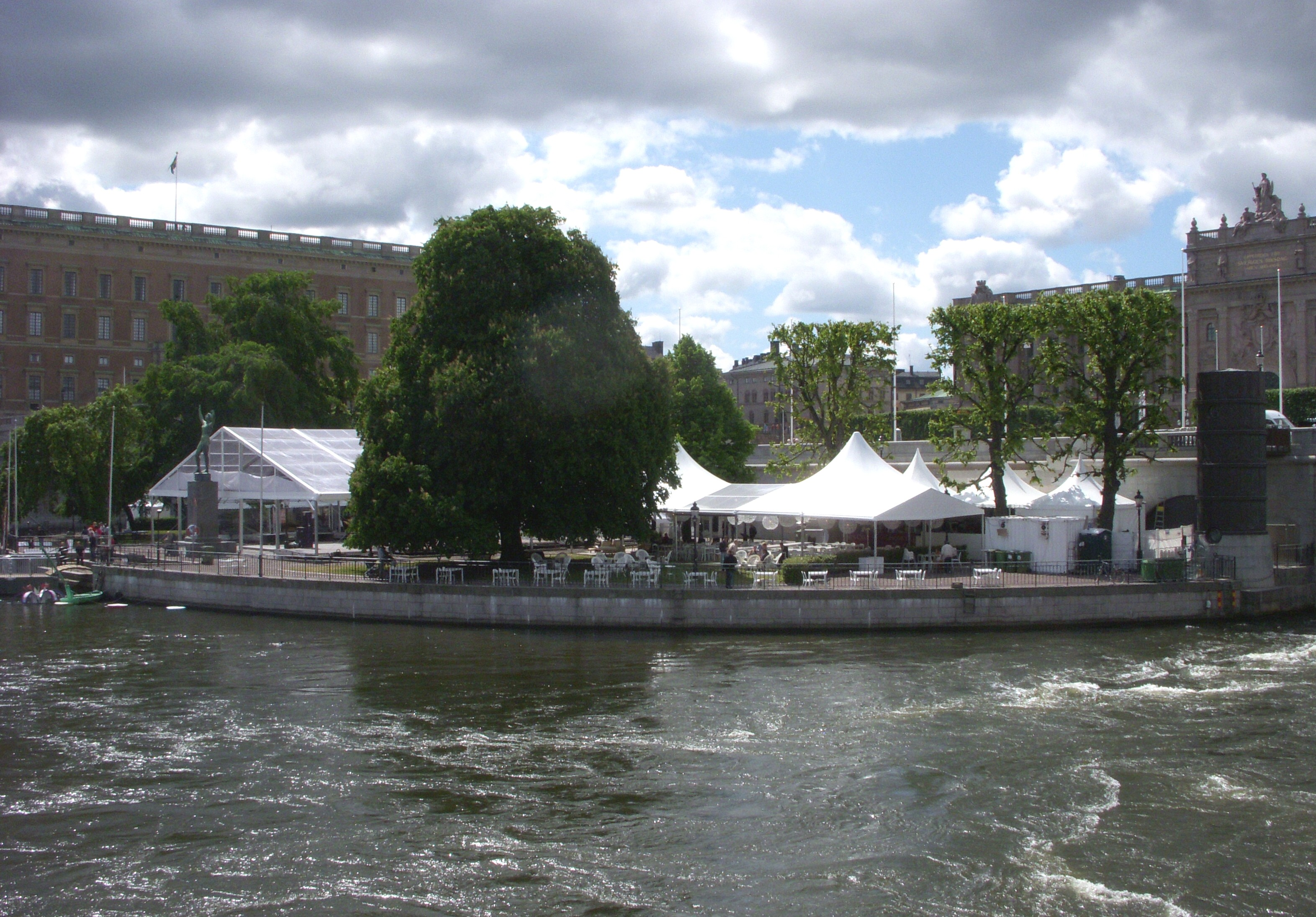
Strömparterren in June 2010 during the 2010 Love Stockholm festival

Strömparterren is a park located in Norrström east of Norrbro on Helgeandsholmen in central Stockholm (Sweden). The park was built in 1830.

At the far end of the semi-circular park stands Carl Milles' sculpture Solsångaren, which was erected in 1926 in memory of Esaias Tegnér. The statue depicts Tegnér's poem Sång till solen (Song to the Sun). On the Strömparterren there is another sculpture, Dimman, a female figure in bronze by Gusten Lindberg, erected in 1910. From the Strömparterren you can also reach the Medieval Museum, which has its premises under Norrbro.
