= Herman Andersson =

Swedish politician

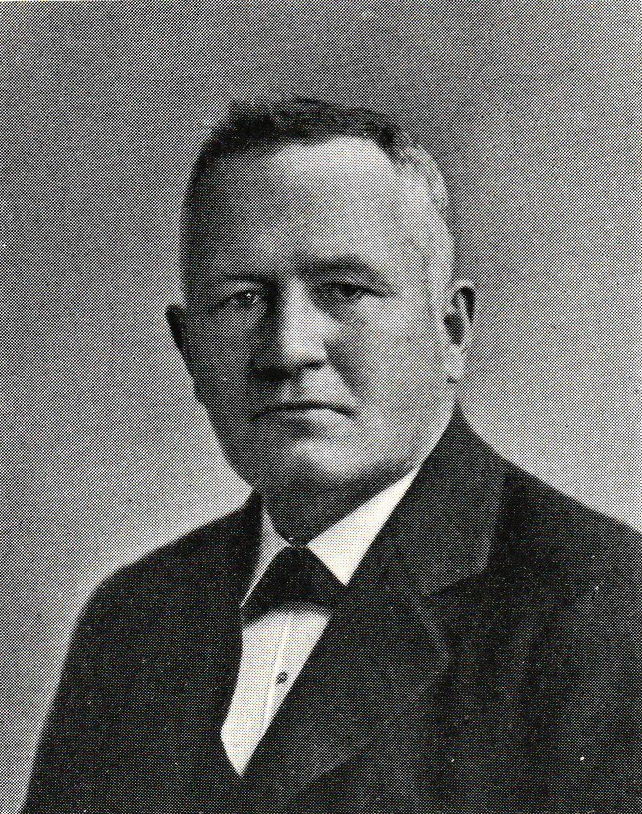

Herman Andersson (15 March 1869 - 3 October 1938) was a Swedish farmer and politician. He represented the Farmer's League (Centre Party) in the lower house of the Swedish bicameral parliament from 1901 until his death in 1938.
