= History of the Riksdag =

History of the national legislature of Sweden

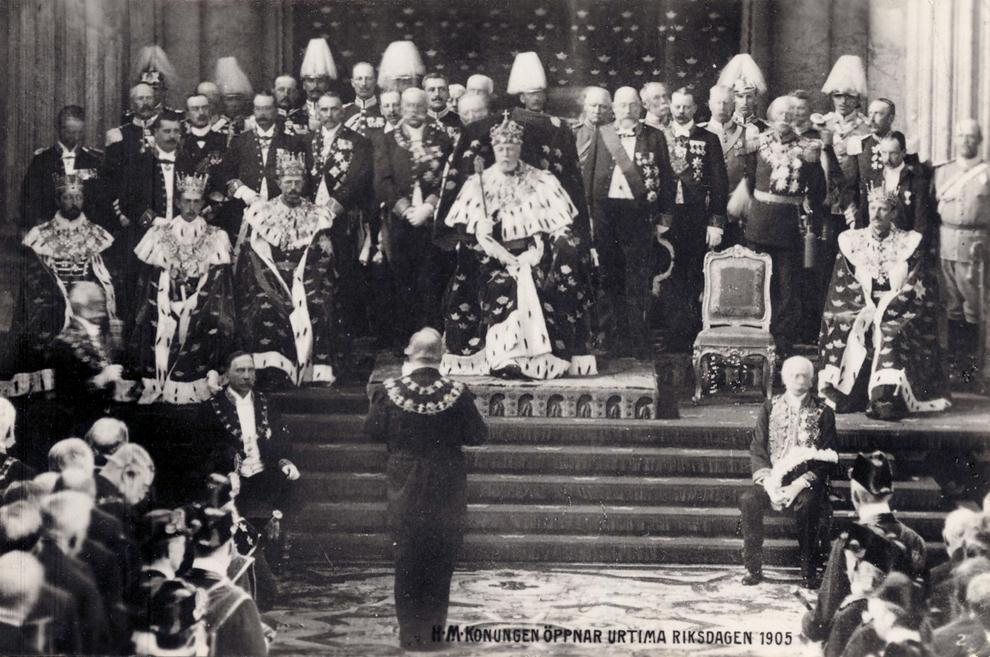
King Oscar II during the Solemn Opening of the Riksdag in the Throne Room of Stockholm Palace in 1905 for the speech from the throne. This annual ceremony was discontinued in 1975.

The Riksdag is the national legislature of Sweden. However, when it was founded in 1866 Sweden did not have a parliamentary system of government.

The national legislatures of Estonia and Finland are also called "Riksdag" in Swedish.

== The Old Riksdag ==
=== Origin ===
The precursor to the modern Riksdag was the Riksdag of the Estates (Swedish: Ståndsriksdagen). Of ancient origin in the Viking Things, the 1435 meeting in the city of Arboga is considered the first Riksdag, but only three of the estates were probably present: the nobility, the clergy and the burghers. This informal representation was formalized in 1527 by King Gustav I of Sweden to include representatives of all the four estates, which historically reflected the lines of division in Swedish society: the nobility, the clergy, the burghers and the peasantry. This ingathering is considered the first formal parliament in Sweden. In the 1540s, the word "Riksdag" was first used. During the reign of Gustav I, the Riksdags were at time convened once every few years and for a short time, leaving them relatively weak and strengthening the power of the monarch.

=== 17th century ===
In the 17th century the Riksdag would approve the raising of troops and the imposition of taxes. The Riksdag convened more frequently which consolidates and strengthened the political power of the representatives of the estates. The Riksdag also began submitting petitions. Under the Carolingian autocracy, the Riksdag became a tool of the king who exercised more autocratic power. During the reign of Karl XI the Riksdag convened only two times.

=== Age of Liberty ===
After the death of Karl XII in 1718, the Riksdag regained its influence; this was aided by the fact that the absolute king and the nobility were viewed as responsible for the poor economic situation and "devastation" in Sweden. From 1718 onwards, important decisions were taken by the Riksdag and the body began to convene for lengthy periods of time to discuss matters at hand. When the Riksdag was not in session, the council of the realm, which functioned as the government at the time, controlled Sweden. When the Riksdag convened it could issue punishments against members of the council if they deviated from the Riksdag's wishes. The Riksdag's functioning began to resemble that of a parliamentary system. Two political camps began to emerge at this time: the caps and the hats. In 1766, the Riksdag passed a law to guarantee freedom of the press, this abolished censorship and allowed the general public to access public records. During the period known as the "Age of Liberty", from 1719 to 1772, when a decision was taken, each of the four estate was given one vote, necessitating three estates to support the implementation of a decision. There were four estates at the time:

- The Burghers, who represented 2 % of the population and consisted of merchants and craftsmen who mostly resided in cities.
- The Nobility, consisting of 1,200 families in Sweden and 0.5% of the population.
- The Clergy, which was about 1 % of the population.
- The Peasantry, which was about 95 % of the population.

The Burghers had around a 100 representatives in the Riksdag. The peasantry had roughly 150 representatives through county districts. The nobles mustered from a couple o hundreds up to a thousand delegates while the clergy had about 50 representatives.

King Gustav III performed a coup d'état in 1772, ending the Age of Liberty and severely weakening the Riksdag while increasing his own power.

=== 1809 Instrument of Government ===
Under the Instrument of Government of 1809 the Riksdag shared the powers of government with the king. The instrument remained valid until 1974. This new instrument took inspiration from the Swedish enlightenment in which division of power was a guiding principle as well as Swedish historical traditions. In 1809 the Office of the Parliamentary Ombudsman was created, it is considered the first public complaints office in the world. A committee of constitution was established which would oversee that the monarch complied to the constitution.

== The New Riksdag ==
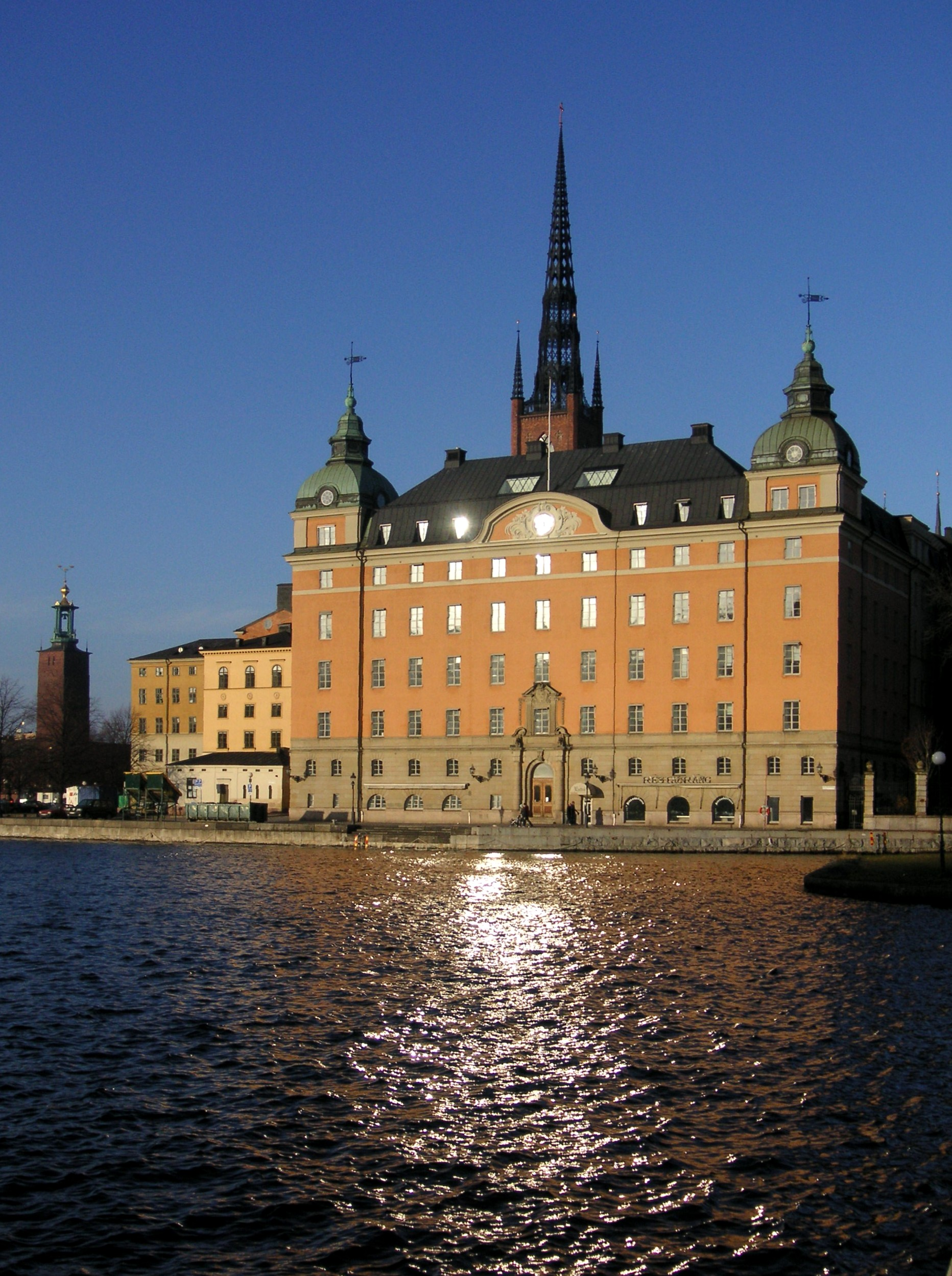
The Old Parliament House on Riddarholmen, it served as the Riksdag's seat in 1833–1905.

On the basis of the 1863 electoral reform bill the Estates voted in 1866 to dissolve the Riksdag of the Estates and establish a new Riksdag. Thus the old estates system was abolished. Most of the Riksdag and the king were not interested at the time in "full democracy with universal and equal suffrage". The new Riksdag was a political assembly with two chambers (bicameral) where the members were chosen in national elections. A decision had to accepted by both chambers to pass.

The major change in the reform was that citizens could participate and vote in the elections without regard to which Estate they had hitherto belonged; instead, there were new requirements on income or wealth, i.e. census suffrage. Despite the fundamental change in the principles of representation, the social composition of the Riksdag did not alter by much, and the system of government had not changed. To vote, one had to meet a set of qualifications. Swedes who did not provide taxes or were supported were not able to vote. Prisoners, the bankrupt and those who did not serve in the military and finish their service could not vote. To be elected to the first chamber one had to be above the age of 35 and hold wealth, the elected received no pay. Those elected to the second chamber received a relatively small salary which meant they did not necessarily have to hold significant assets to hold office. Those who possessed wealth had more votes for the First chamber while the votes to the Second chamber worked as one vote per man. Under the Instrument of 1809 the Riksdag still divided the powers of government with the king.

== Democracy emerges ==
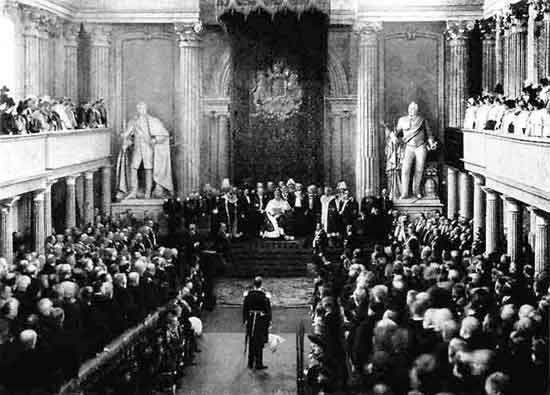
Riksdag opening, 1897

From the second half of the 19th century, when the Riksdag was founded, until the early 20th century, Swedish society underwent fundamental changes that impacted on the political system. Political demands, but also sheer economic progress, increased the size of the electorate and the degree of political mobilization. This in turn also sponsored the emergence and growth of political parties. As such, the legislature became more assertive against royal authority, successfully asserting responsible government; a parliamentary system thus became de facto established; the king could not (or at least would not dare) keep a government in office against parliamentary objections.

Between 1907 and 1909, universal suffrage to Swedish men was granted. This was carried out under the government led by Arvid Lindman. All Swedish men above 24 could vote for the Second chamber without any of the prior qualifications involving them having to possess wealth or income.

=== Courtyard Crisis ===
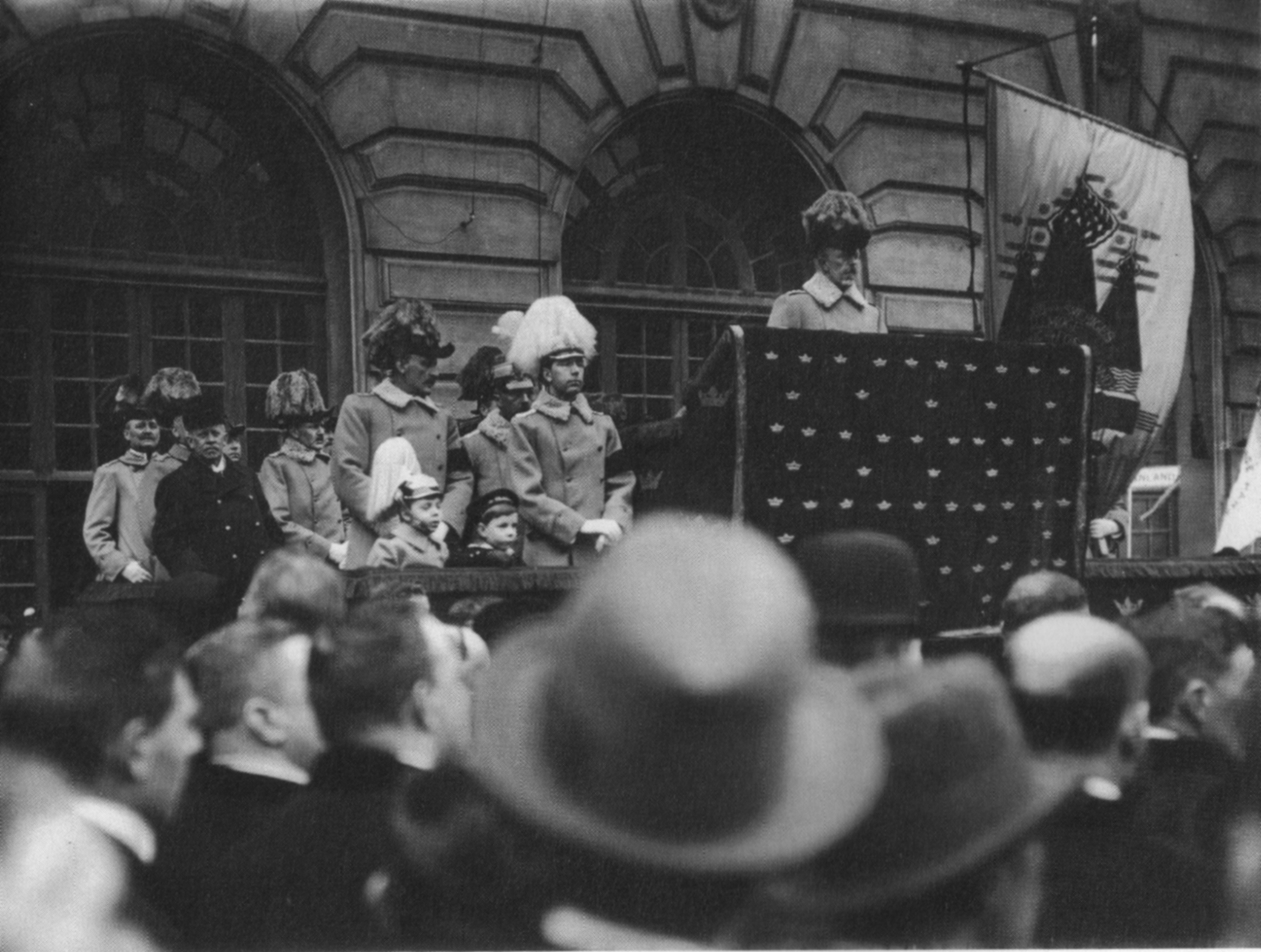
Gustav V's courtyard speech

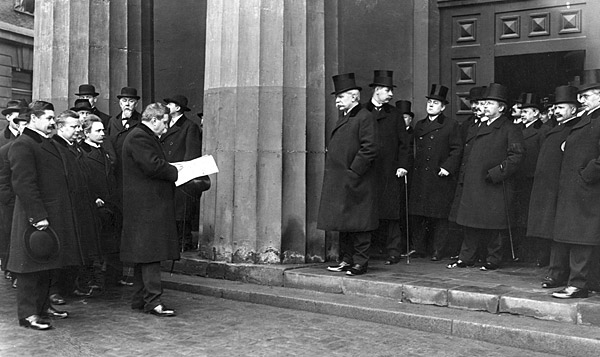
Karl Staaff, the prime minister to the right of the column listens to a speech by Hjalmar Branting, the leader of the social democrats in the opposition. 1914.

The last time the king attempted to assert himself in opposition to the Riksdag was the Courtyard Crisis of 1914, where King Gustav V delivered a partisan speech which precipitated the resignation of Prime Minister Karl Staaff and his government. Though the outbreak of World War I kept the King's conservative government, headed by Hjalmar Hammarskjöld in office, in the face of popular unrest (also resulting from food shortages) and a clear majority for the opposition Social Democrats and Liberals at the 1917 general election, the King reluctantly resolved to appoint a cabinet from the reform-minded majority in the Riksdag. The new government's main task was to present bills on constitutional reform.

In 2023, Micaela Edhager argued that courtyard crisis also reflected a confrontation between two different ideas of how Sweden's political system should be arranged, a monarchical one vs a parliamentary system.

=== Further reforms ===
The franchise had been extended to all adult men in 1907; women's suffrage first came in the 1921 general election to the second chamber of the Riksdag. In 1919, women as well as all other Swedes who were of age, were given the right to vote in elections for county and municipal councils. This reform affected the First chamber, as its members were chosen by the county councils.

== Constitutional reform ==
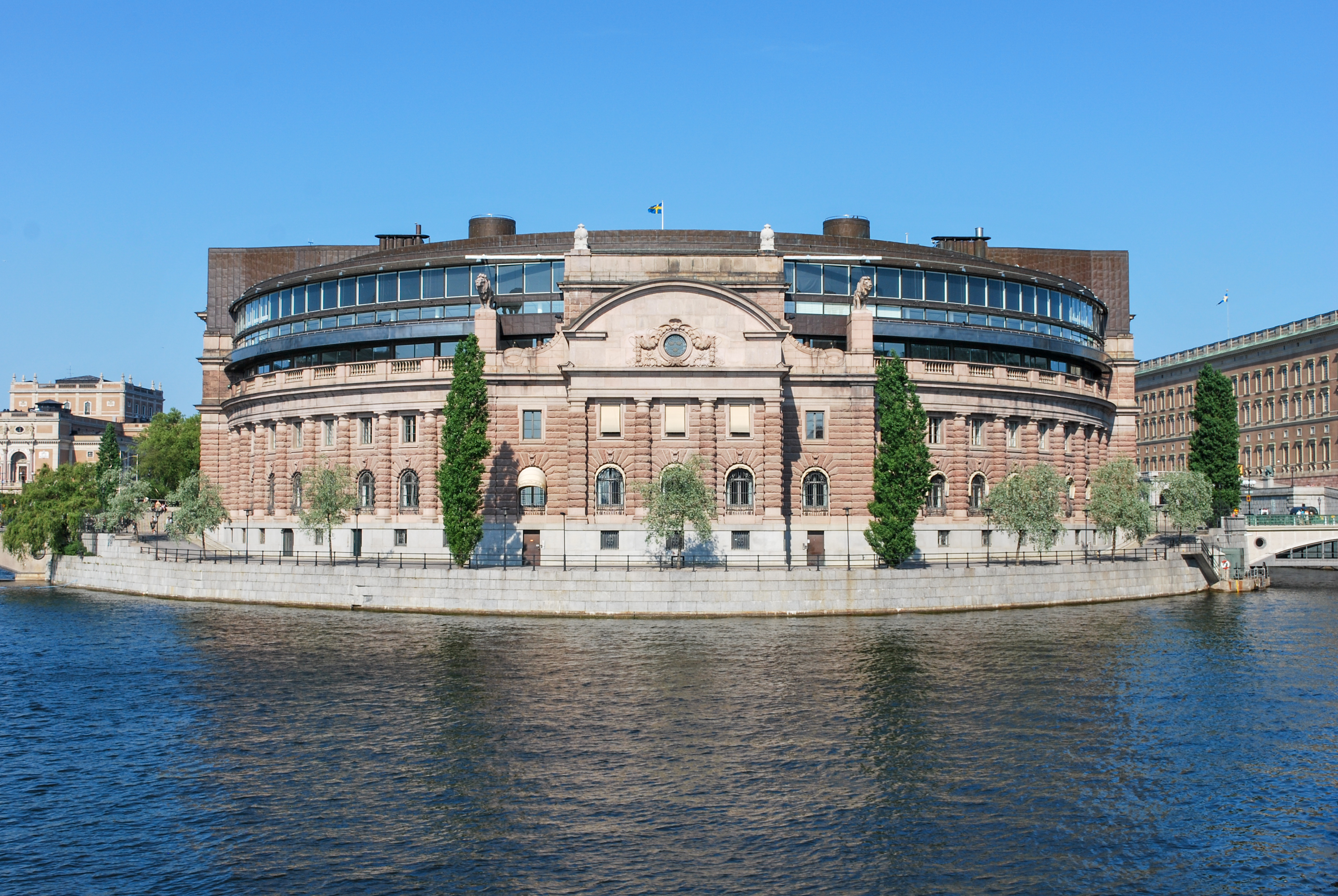
The Riksdagshuset as seen from the west (from the Vasabron bridge)

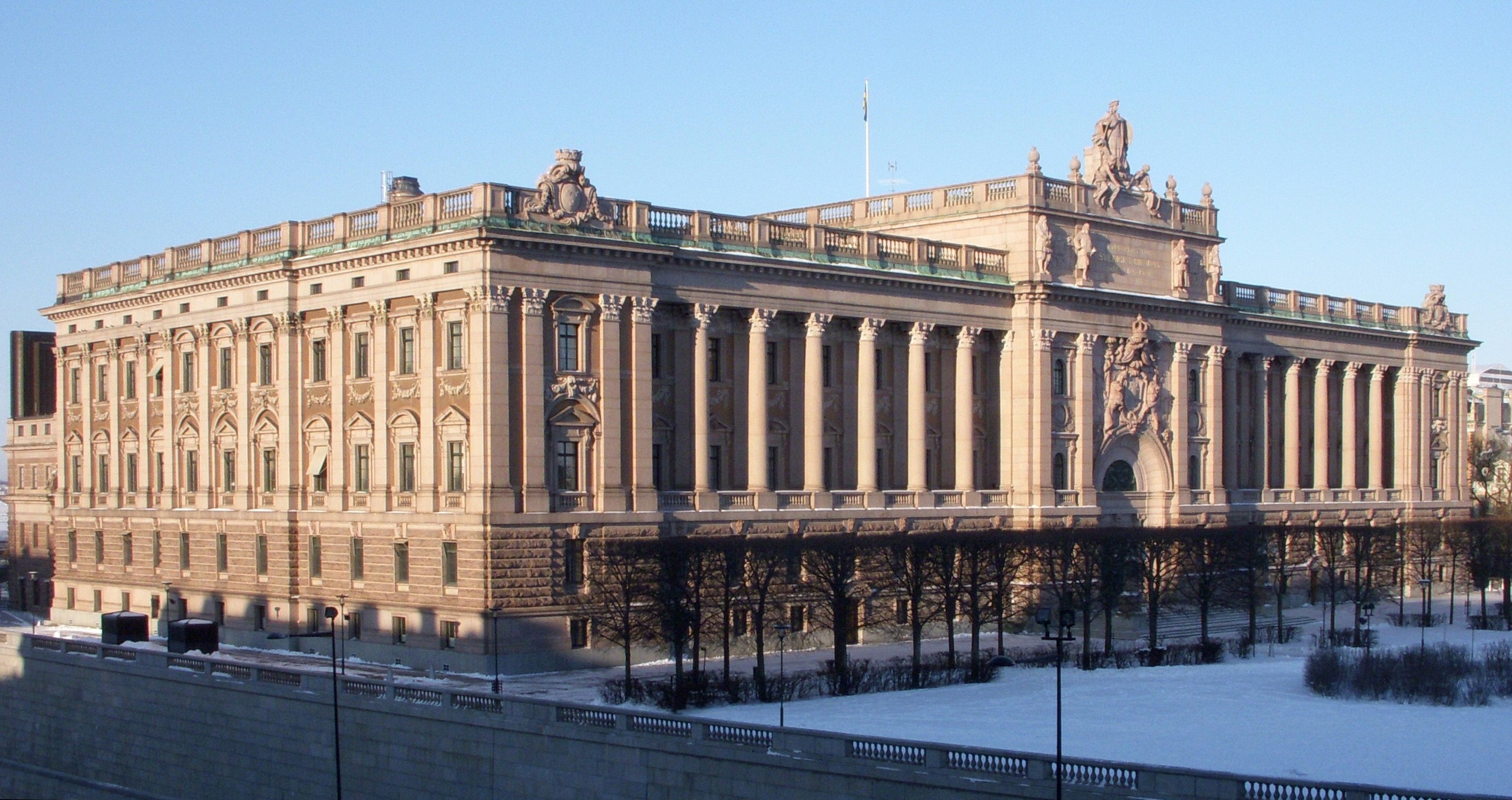
Riksdagshuset, the parliament house of the Riksdag

In the 1960s, debates intensified over constitutional reform in Sweden. The fundamental question was over the system of government. Even though a de facto parliamentary system was firmly established, somewhat similar to the situation in the United Kingdom, there were demands for a more democratic constitution. One of the main issues was whether the monarchy would survive constitutional reform and this blocked the issue for a long time. According to the old instrument of government from 1809, the monarch ruled the country despite the country having de facto transitioned to a parliamentary system.

In 1945, Swedes above the age of voting who were in relief or aid schemes were not permitted to vote.

Women first served as members of the Riksdag in 1922, however only in the 1960s did women's representation increase. Also, beginning in the 1960s they received more meaningful political appointments.

Effective from 1970, a reform of the Riksdag had been agreed upon. Though not technically part of the constitution it showed that the parties in the Riksdag were able to agree upon fundamental changes of the political system, which transformed the Riksdag from a bicameral legislature into a unicameral one. This would have 350 seats, all of which would be filled by direct election. However, the second general election to the unicameral Riksdag only gave the government support from 175 members, while the opposition could mobilize an equal force of 175 members, resulting in what became known as the "lottery Riksdag", in which the Speaker had to draw lots to resolve deadlocked votes. On 6 March 1974 it was passed in law that all public power in Sweden arises from the people. It was also decided that the Riskdag is the "foremost representative of the people". In 1974, it was decided that the number of seats from 1977 were to be reduced to 349. The new instrument of government adopted in 1974 left the monarch as a ceremonial head of state without political power. The new instrument of government read as follows: “All public power in Sweden proceeds from the people. Swedish democracy is founded on the free formation of opinion and on universal and equal suffrage. It is realised through a representative and parliamentary form of government and through local self-government. Public power is exercised under the law.”

== Present ==
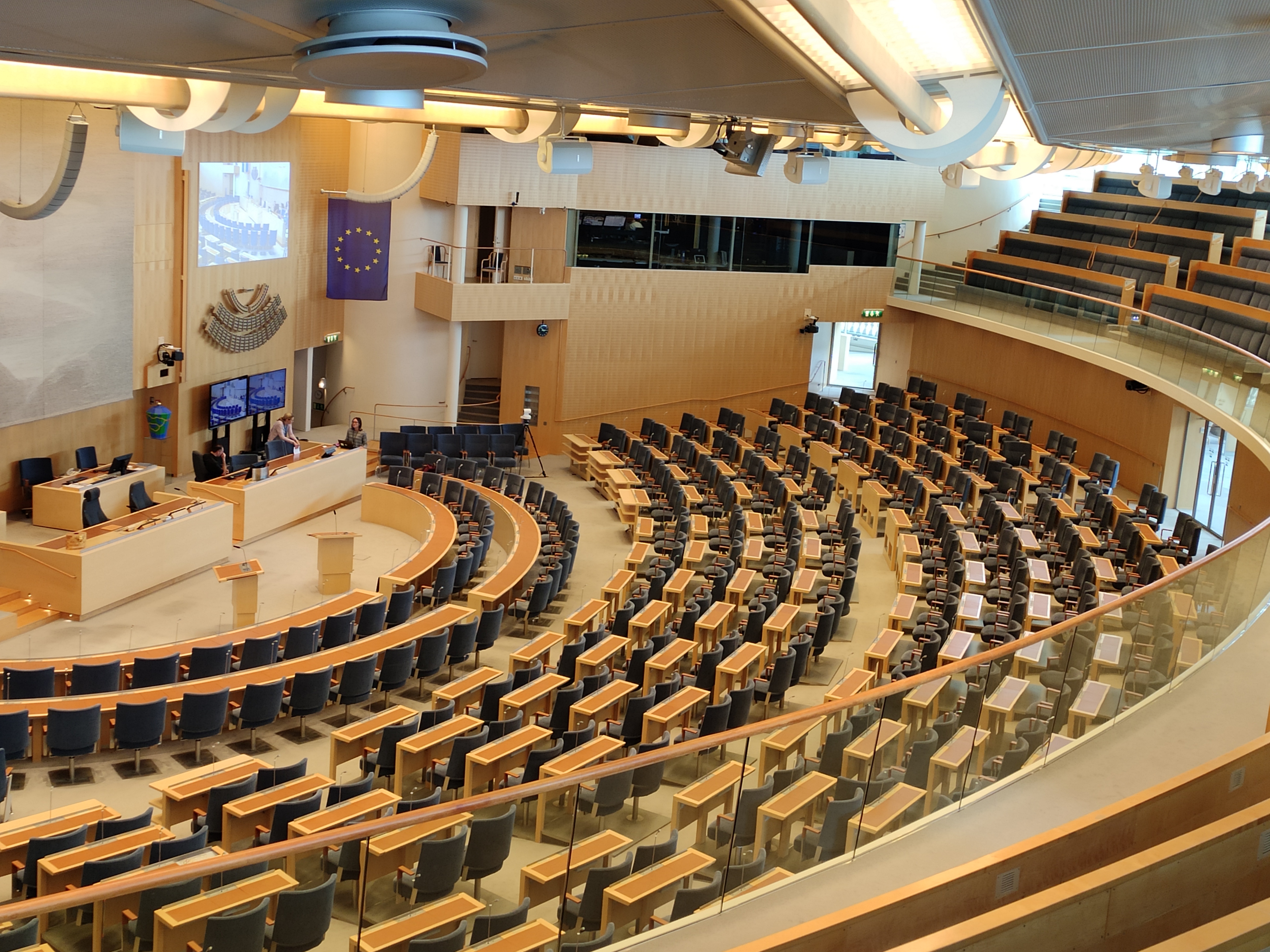
Inside the Riksdag, convention hall

In 1974, a new Instrument of Government was established as a vital part of the Constitution and for the system of government. The monarchy was retained, whereas the monarch lost all formal political influence and became only a symbolic head of state. Several of the traditional head-of-state functions have instead been transferred to the Speaker of the Riksdag.

In 1989, people who were deemed "legally incompetent" (at the time people suffering from mental illness or disabilities) were allowed to vote. For a person to be eligible to vote for the Riksdag one must be a Swedish citizen and at the age of 18 or above. Since 1994, the percentage of women in the Rikstag has fluctuated from 40 to 60 percent.

Today, what is described as "fundamental laws" can be amended if the amendment is adopted in its exact wording by two parliaments (meaning a parliament before an election and the parliament after the election had both adopted the same amendment with the same exact wording).

== See also ==
- Government of Sweden
- Politics of Sweden
- Riksdagsmusiken
