= Fredrik Aarnseth =

Swedish politician (1872–1925)

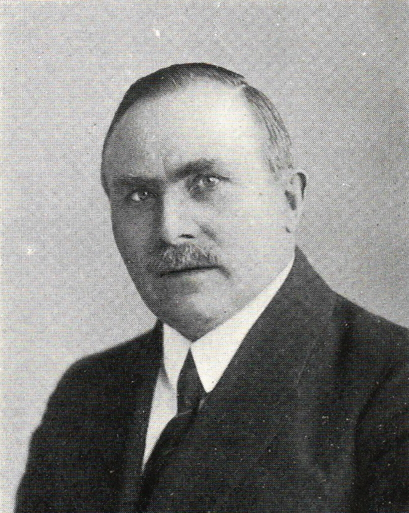
- Born: Fredrik Olsen Aarnseth; 18 October 1872; Norway
- Died: 16 April 1925 (aged 52)
- Occupation: Politician

Fredrik Olsen Aarnseth (18 October 1872 – 16 April 1925) was a Norwegian-born Swedish politician and a member of the Swedish Social Democratic Party.

Aarnseth was a sergeant in the Norwegian Army, but began working as a railroad worker in Sweden around 1900.

He was an agitator and a union representative for the Grov- och fabriksarbetarförbundet from 1906 to 1916. He was a member of the Swedish Parliament from 1917 to 1921, elected by Kopparberg's Western county district and re-elected to the same county district from 1922 until his death. During this time he was an alternate member for the Committee on Environment and Agriculture.

Aarnseth was also active as an author and he published several works including Svenska järnvägsbyggnadsarbetarefackföreningen 1902–1912 (Swedish Railroad Labor Union 1902–1912), Rallarne och syndikalismen (The navvies and the syndicalism), Några iakttagelser och erinringar (A few observations and reminders).
