= David Boman =

Swedish politician (1888–1956)

David Boman (February 2, 1888 – December 10, 1956) was a Swedish politician from Mörlunda, Kalmar. He was a member of the Centre Party. Boman was a member of the Swedish parliament (lower chamber) where he represented the Stockholm constituency between 1945 and 1952.
