= Old Parliament House, Stockholm =

Coordinates: 59°19′26.29″N 18°3′54.38″E

Old Parliament House
- Gamla riksdagshuset
- Gamla riksdagshuset, 1911 facade.

General information
- Location: Stockholm, Sweden
- Construction started: 1833
- Completed: 1833
- Client: Riksdagen of the Estates; Riksdagen (Swedish Parliament)

Design and construction
- Architect: Johan Fredrik Åbom

The Old Parliament House (Swedish: Gamla riksdagshuset) is the former seat of the Parliament of Sweden (Riksdag), located at Birger Jarls torg, on the Riddarholmen (island), in central Stockholm. It was used until January 1905, when the building on Helgeandsholmen was inaugurated.

The building nowadays houses the Administrative Court of Appeal in Stockholm.

== History ==
The Old Parliament House was the seat of:

- the Riksdag of the Estates from 1833 to 1866
- the bicameral Riksdag from 1866 to 1905.

An additional section on the seaside was designed in 1911 by Aron Johansson, in the National Romantic style.

== See also ==
- Architecture of Stockholm
- History of the Riksdag
- House of the Estates in Helsinki
- Parliament House, Stockholm — housing the Swedish Parliament since 1910.
