= Andra kammaren =

Former lower house of the Swedish Riksdag (1866–1970)

Second Chamber Andra kammaren
- Coat of arms of Sweden

Type
- Type: Lower house

History
- Established: 22 June 1866
- Disbanded: 20 September 1970

Meeting place
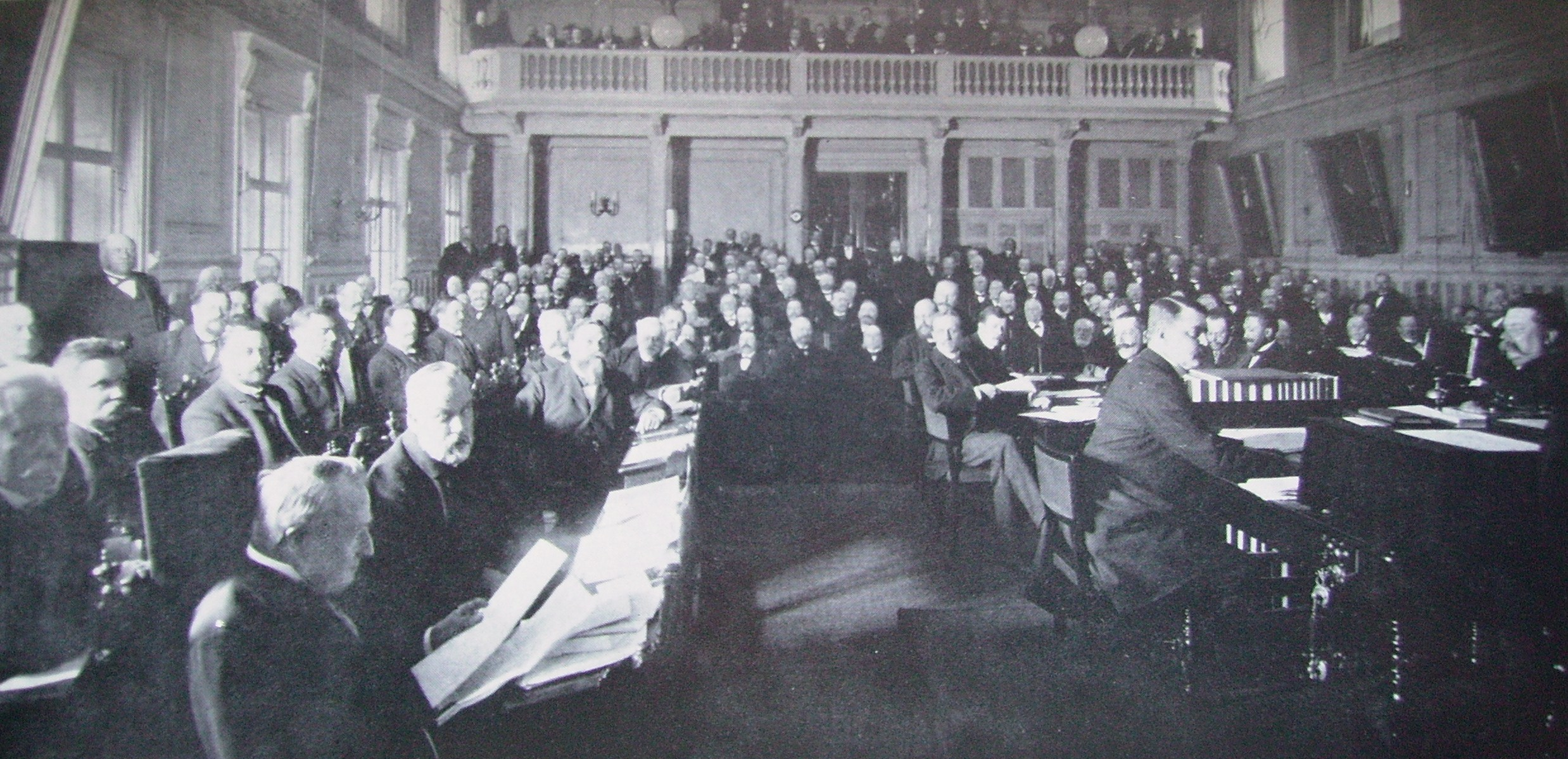
- Old Parliament House, Stockholm

The Andra kammaren (lit. 'Second Chamber', often abbreviated 'AK'; referred to in some non-Swedish sources as the Chamber of Deputies) was the lower house of the bicameral Riksdag of Sweden between 1866 and 1970 that replaced the Riksdag of the Estates. The upper house was the Första kammaren.

At the time of its abolition the chamber had 233 members, who were elected for four-year terms of office by men and women over the age of twenty. Both chambers had the same powers. At the last general election in 1968, the Social Democrats received more than half the votes (50.1%).

== Early composition ==
Until 1916, the Andra kammaren was composed of 230 members, elected by popular vote. Members of the chamber served for three-year terms and were typically sworn in during September of the election year, except in the case of mid-term appointments, for which solemnization was immediate; members of the chamber appointed midway through a term finished out that term and then were required to achieve re-election at the regular interval to retain their seat.

== Changes after increased voter enfranchisement ==
1916 saw significant changes to regulations governing elections and the compositions of Sweden's legislature. Suffrage was extended, with all men aged 24 and older allowed to vote, with certain exceptions for those who were in poor legal or financial standing with the state. Membership in the chamber itself was also opened up, with all male citizens who met the eligibility standards to vote capable of attaining a seat of equal standing within the lower chamber. In 1924, the right to vote for and stand in the second chamber was extended to women, provided that they were Swedish citizens who were over the age of 23 by the year the election took place. In 1970, as a part of broader governmental reforms, the two houses of the Riksdag were merged into a unicameral body, initially of 350 members.

== Location ==
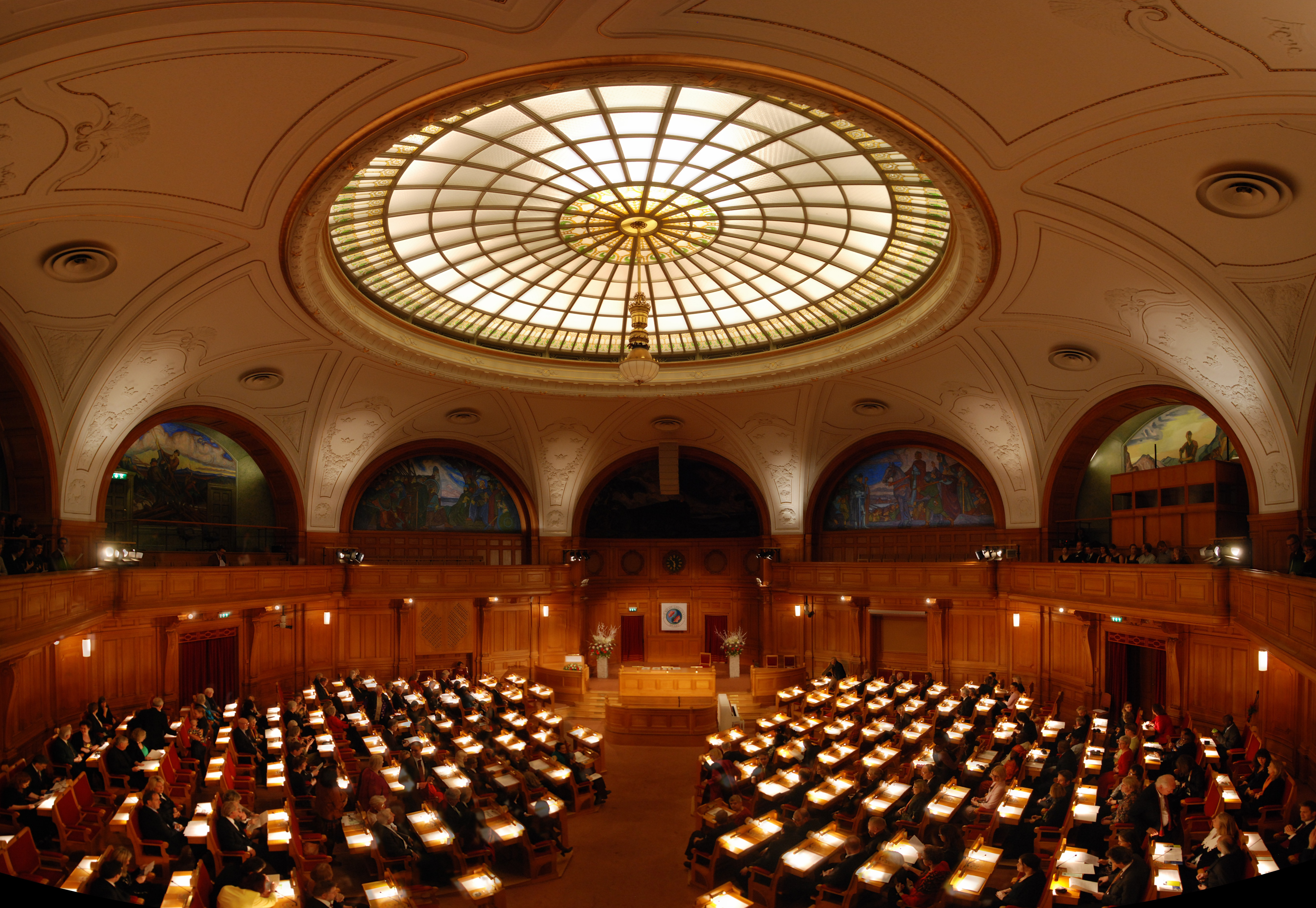
The Second Chamber of Parliament House, hosting the Right Livelihood Award ceremony in 2009.

From 1867 to 1904, sessions of the Andra kammaren took place in the Old Parliament House on the island of Riddarholmen, where both the upper and lower chamber had their own hall. In 1905, the chamber moved to new facilities in the newly constructed Parliament House on the island of Helgeandsholmen. The ornate furnishings of the new hall included fine wood paneling with three noteworthy frescoes ( "Landscape with Beacons", "Torgny Judge at the Thing in Uppsala", and "Engelbrekt at the head of the peasant army") added in 1913 by the artist Axel Törneman. The second chamber's facilities continue to serve in various ceremonial capacities, including hosting the annual Right Livelihood Award ceremony.

== See also ==
- History of the Riksdag

== Literature ==
- Little encyclopaedia, publisher: Nordic AB, Malmö 1974, page 8, column 139 ff.
- Foreign political systems, Oxford University Press 1995, Rutger Lindahl (ed.)
