= List of members of the upper house of the Riksdag =

This is an incomplete list of all people who served in the Första kammaren of the Riksdag.

== Key ==
Color key:
Centre of the Upper House
Farmers' League—Centre Party
Conservative Group
Ehrenheimian Party
Farmers' National Organization
Free-minded National Association
Free-minded People's Party
Free-trade Party of the Lower House
Lantmanna Party
Social Democratic Left Party—Communist Party—Left Party-Communists
Liberal Party of Sweden
Ministerial Group
Minority Party
Moderate Party of the Upper House
National Organisation of the Right—Rightist Party—Moderate Party
National Party
Old Lantmanna Party
People's Party
Protectionist Party
Scanian Party
Socialist Party
Social Democratic Party
United Right Party
Upper House branch of the Lantmanna Party
independent

== A ==
Representative	Lifespan	Profession	Party	Years	Constituency
Ragnar Aaby-Ericsson			Rightist Party	1949–1950	Kronoberg and Halland Counties
Nils Aastrup			People's Party	1954–1959	City of Stockholm
Rudolph Abelin			independent Protectionist Party	1871–1898	Östergötland County
Erik Abrahamsson			Free-minded National Association; Free-minded People's Party	1922–1930	Jönköping County
Claes Adelsköld	1824–1907	former major	independent Minority Party	1976–1893	Västerbotten County, Blekinge County
Axel Adelswärd			independent	1871–1879	Östergötland County
Theodor Adelswärd			Free-minded National Association; Liberal Party of Sweden	1920–1924	Östergötland County
Rudolf Adlersparre			independent	1867–1874; 1878–1885	Värmland County
Fredrik Georg Afzelius			independent	1878–1884	Uppsala County
Ivar Afzelius			Ministerial Group; Moderate Party of the Upper House; National Party	1898–1903; 1905–1915	City of Stockholm
Ernst Ahlberg			Rightist Party	1952–1953	City of Stockholm
Emil Ahlkvist			Social Democratic Party	1940–1965	Malmöhus County
Per Ahlmark			People's Party	1967–1968	Örebro County
Johan Ahlsten			People's Party	1965–1966	Örebro County
Harald Åkerberg			Social Democratic Party	1927–1934	Örebro County
Knut Åkerberg			Protectionist Party; United Right Party	1899–1910	Skaraborg County
Carl Åkerhielm			independent	1871–1874	Örebro County
Gustaf Åkerhielm	1833–1900	prime minister	independent Protectionist Party	1876–1893; 1895–1900	Stockholm County
Lars Åkerhielm			Protectionist Party; United Right Party independent National Party	1891–1913	Gothenburg and Bohus County
Henrik Åkerlund			Rightist Party	1963–1970	Stockholm and Uppsala Counties
Assar Emanuel Åkerman			Social Democratic Party	1919–1936	Södermanland County, Södermanland and Västmanland Counties
Richard Åkerman			Protectionist Party; United Right Party	1892–1910	Värmland County
Johannes Åkesson			Free-minded National Association	1915–1919	Kristianstad County
Nils Åkesson			National Party	1915–1919	Kristianstad County
Sten Åkesson			People's Party	1956–1970	Blekinge and Kristianstad Counties
Eskil Albertsson			People's Party	1937–1947	Jönköping County
Erik Alexanderson			People's Party	1955–1970	Stockholm and Uppsala Counties
Nils Alexanderson			Free-minded National Association	1912–1921	Uppsala County
Oscar Alin	1846–1900	professor	Protectionist Party	1889–1899	Uppsala County
Edvard Alkman			Free-minded National Association; Liberal Party of Sweden	1916–1919; 1928–1929	Gothenburg and Bohus County, Älvsborg County
Ulla Alm, see Ulla Lindström
Ulla Alm-Lindström, see Ulla Lindström
August Almén			independent Minority Party	1886–1902	Västerbotten County
Johan Almer			Free-minded National Association	1912–1919	Halland County
Fredrik Almgren			Protectionist Party	1889–1903	Norrbotten County, Älvsborg County
Oscar Almgren	1842–1910	wholesale dealer	Minority Party; Moderate Party of the Upper House	1890–1910	City of Stockholm
John Almkvist			Free-minded National Association; Free-minded People's Party	1919–1930	Västerbotten County, Västerbotten and Norrbotten Counties
Gustaf Fridolf Almquist			independent	1871–1880	Västerbotten County
Gustaf Almqvist			Protectionist Party	1892–1899	Jönköping County
Ludvig Almqvist			independent	1867–1869	Stockholm County
Victor Almqvist			independent	1867–1869	Västerbotten County
Robert Almström			Protectionist Party	1888–1896	City of Stockholm
Robert Almström			Protectionist Party; United Right Party	1898–1910	Gävleborg County
Jonas Alströmer			Protectionist Party	1892–1896; 1900–1905	Älvsborg County
Oscar Alströmer			independent	1873–1881	Halland County
Valter Åman			Social Democratic Party	1946–1961	City of Stockholm
Johan Amilon			independent	1901–1907	Kristianstad County
Ruth Amundson			Rightist Party	1949–1949	Gothenburg and Bohus County
Rudolf Anderberg			Social Democratic Party	1937–1960	Malmöhus County
Carl Albert Anderson			Social Democratic Party	1954–1969	City of Stockholm
Erik Anderson			National Party; National Organization of the Right	1921–1937	Kalmar County Northern, Kalmar and Gotland Counties
Frans Albert Anderson			independent	1878–1886	Jönköping County
Ivar Anderson			Rightist Party	1941–1948	Östergötland County
Iwar Anderson			Social Democratic Party	1940–1955	Södermanland and Västmanland Counties
Albert Andersson			Farmers' League	1939–1946	Stockholm and Uppsala Counties
Albin Andersson			Farmers' League	1922–1925	Gothenburg and Bohus County
Alfred Andersson			Social Democratic Party	1933–1951	Malmöhus County
Alvar Andersson			Farmers' League	1954–1958	Kronoberg and Halland Counties
Anders Andersson i Markaryd			Social Democratic Party	1935–1944	Kronoberg and Halland Counties
Andreas Andersson			independent	1875–1883	Jönköping County
Axel Andersson			People's Party	1949–1970	Västernorrland and Jämtland Counties
Axel Andersson			Centre Party	1957–1964	Gävleborg County
Bertil Andersson			Social Democratic Party	1950–1963	Södermanland and Västmanland Counties
Ebon Andersson			Rightist Party	1946–1966	City of Stockholm
Elof Andersson			Free-minded National Association; Free-minded People's Party; People's Party	1921–1940	Kristianstad County, Blekinge and Kristianstad Counties
Elon Andersson			People's Party	1937–1954	Gävleborg County
Emil Andersson			Rightist Party	1937–1941	Gothenburg and Bohus County
Gösta Andersson i Kolstad			Farmers' National Organization	1919–1921	Östergötland County
Gunnar Andersson i Djursholm			Free-minded National Association	1919–1921	City of Helsingborg
Gunnar Andersson i Rossvik			Rightist Party	1943–1947	Södermanland and Västmanland Counties
Gunnar Andersson i Gustavsberg			Social Democratic Party	1957–1959	Stockholm and Uppsala Counties
Gustaf Andersson i Källstad			independent	1879–1882	Östergötland County
Gustaf Andersson i Kolstad			Protectionist Party; United Right Party; National Party	1888–1899; 1901–1913	Östergötland County
Gustaf Andersson			Social Democratic Party	1948–1958	Södermanland and Västmanland Counties
Gustav Andersson			Farmers' League	1944–1953	Jönköping County
Henrik Andersson			Farmers' League	1925–1933	Västernorrland and Jämtland Counties
Ingvar Andersson			Moderate Party	1969–1970	Malmöhus County
Ivar Andersson			Social Democratic Party	1968–1970	Kopparberg County
Johan Andersson i Sjöberg			independent	1889–1890	Skaraborg County
Jonas Andersson i Trossnäs			independent	1881–1889	Värmland County
Jonas Andersson i Hedsta			National Party	1922–1930	Gävleborg County
Jones Erik Andersson			Farmers' League	1944–1951	Kopparberg County
Karl Andersson i Fiskebäckskil			Free-minded National Association; Liberal Party of Sweden	1913–1913; 1920–1925; 1931–1933	Gothenburg and Bohus County
Karl Andersson i Eliantorp			Farmers' League	1922–1932	Östergötland County
Karl Andersson i Rixö			Social Democratic Party	1938–1957	Gothenburg and Bohus County
Lars Andersson i Hedensbyn			Farmers' League	1947–1956	Västerbotten and Norrbotten Counties
Nils Andersson			independent	1888–1891	Kristianstad County
Nils Andersson i Östersund			Social Democratic Party	1933–1940	Västernorrland and Jämtland Counties
Per Andersson i Koldemo			Farmers' League	1922–1944	Gävleborg County
Per Johan Andersson			Protectionist Party	1888–1892; 1895–1907	Älvsborg County
Sten Andersson			Social Democratic Party	1966–1970	Värmland County
Sven Andersson i Sveneby			Upper House branch of the Lantmanna Party	1873	Skaraborg County
Sven Andersson			Social Democratic Party	1948–1970	Södermanland and Västmanland Counties
Torsten Andersson	1909–1978	editor-in-chief	Centre Party	1957–1968	Älvborg County
Verner Andersson			Farmers' League	1935–1944	Kronoberg and Halland Counties
Egon Andreasson			Centre Party	1969–1970	Blekinge and Kristianstad Counties
Torsten Andrée			Social Democratic Party	1949–1952	Malmöhus County
Georg Andrén			Rightist Party	1938–1951	Älvsborg County
Wilhelm Annér			People's Party	1946–1948	Västernorrland and Jämtland Counties
Arvid Annerås			People's Party	1969–1970	Kronoberg and Halland Counties
Ludvig Annerstedt			Ministerial Group	1890–1904	City of Stockholm
Anders Antonsson			Moderate Party of the Upper House; National Party	1911–1928	City of Malmö, Malmöhus County
Harry Apelqvist			Social Democratic Party	1956–1957	Kalmar and Gotland Counties
Anders Apelstam			Minority Party; Moderate Party of the Upper House	1902–1905	Halland County
Ernst Åqvist			People's Party	1943–1943	Örebro County
Magnus Arhusiander			Minority Party	1892–1894	Västernorrland County
Anders Aronsson			Farmers' League	1939–1942	Stockholm and Uppsala Counties
Erik Arrhén			Rightist Party	1943–1958	Gothenburg and Bohus County
Johan Arrhenius			independent	1867–1872	Kalmar County Southern
John-Arvid Arvidson			Rightist Party	1958–1968	Malmöhus County
Axel Asker			Moderate Party of the Upper House; National Party	1909–1912	Halland County
Sven Aspling			Social Democratic Party	1956–1958	Kopparberg County
Gustaf Asplund			independent	1868–1882	Jämtland County
Manne Asplund			Social Democratic Party	1912–1942	Norrbotten County, Värmland County, Västerbotten and Norrbotten Counties
Anders Åström			Moderate Party of the Upper House; National Party	1908–1915	Västerbotten County
Ernst Åström			Social Democratic Left Party; Social Democratic Party	1922–1935	Kopparberg County
Gillis Augustsson			Social Democratic Party	1961–1970	Östergötland County
Anders Axelson			People's Party	1969–1970	Värmland County

== B ==
Representative	Lifespan	Profession	Party	Years	Constituency
Helge Bäcklund			Social Democratic Party	1936–1943	Skaraborg County
Carl Alfred Bäckström			independent Minority Party	1881–1889	Västmanland County
Helge Bäckström			Social Democratic Party	1912–1921| Malmöhus County	
Magnus Bäckström			Free-minded People's Party; People's Party	1933–1946	Västerbotten and Norrbotten Counties
Frans Bæckström			Protectionist Party; United Right Party	1908–1911	Örebro County
Gösta Bagge			National Party; National Organization of the Right	1932–1936	City of Stockholm
Johan von Bahr			National Party	1912–1917	Uppsala County
Johan Bärg			Social Democratic Party	1924–1947	Södermanland and Västmanland Counties
Adolf Barnekow			independent	1886–1890	Kristianstad County
Fredrik Barnekow			Scanian Party; Protectionist Party	1878–1895	Kristianstad County
Ragnar Barnekow			Free-minded National Association	1919–1921	Kristianstad County
Gustaf Barthelson			Protectionist Party; United Right Party; National Party	1908–1921	Skaraborg County
Carl von Baumgarten			independent Protectionist Party; United Right Party; National Party	1884–1890; 1905–1913	Kronoberg County
Carl Beck-Friis			Rightist Party	1938–1947	Stockholm and Uppsala Counties
Corfitz Beck-Friis			independent Scanian Party	1867–1884	Malmöhus County
Joachim Beck-Friis the Elder			independent	1884–1884	Stockholm County
Joachim Beck-Friis the Younger			Protectionist Party; United Right Party; National Party	1900–1916	Stockholm County
Johan Beck-Friis			Protectionist Party; United Right Party; National Party independent	1904–1919; 1927–1929	Östergötland County
Lave Beck-Friis			Free-minded National Association	1911–1911	Skaraborg County
Carl-Fredrik Beckman			independent National Party	1911–1917	Malmöhus County
Ernst Beckman			Free-minded National Association	1911–1913	Stockholm County
Herman Behm			independent Protectionist Party; United Right Party	1887–1911	Örebro County
Carl Gottreich Beijer			independent	1871–1894	City of Malmö
August Bellinder			Protectionist Party; United Right Party	1908–1911	Älvsborg County
Gustaf Benedicks			Protectionist Party	1892–1909	Västmanland County
Torsten Bengtson			Farmers' League	1950–1970	Jönköping County
Carl Bengtsson			Rightist Party	1930–1945	Älvsborg County
Jöns Bengtsson			independent	1876–1893	Malmöhus County
Axel Bennich			independent Minority Party	1867–1893	Jämtland County
Gunnar Berg			Social Democratic Party	1956–1963	Blekinge and Kristianstad Counties
Gustaf Berg			Protectionist Party	1891–1908	Jönköping County
Gustaf Berg			Protectionist Party	1896–1904	Skaraborg County
Lars Berg			Protectionist Party; United Right Party	1890–1899; 1902–1910	Norrbotten County
Oscar Berg			independent	1876–1884	Kopparberg County
Robert Berg			Social Democratic Party	1934–1947	Blekinge and Kristianstad Counties
Theodor Berg			independent	1868–1876	Älvsborg County
Volrath Berg			Protectionist Party; United Right Party	1905–1911	Älvsborg County
Adolf Berge			Social Democratic Party	1920–1926	Stockholm County, Stockholm and Uppsala Counties
Gustaf Bergendahl			Protectionist Party	1900–1904	Skaraborg County
Klas Hugo Bergendahl			independent National Party	1907–1912	Kronoberg County
Anders Berger			Minority Party	1870–1871	Örebro County
Ossian Berger			independent Moderate Party of the Upper House	1907–1912	Kalmar County Southern, Örebro County
Emil Berggren			Protectionist Party; United Right Party; National Party	1907–1913	Norrbotten County
Henrik Berggren			Protectionist Party	1900–1908	Blekinge County
Ragnar Bergh			Rightist Party	1943–1962	Västerbotten and Norrbotten Counties
Oscar Bergius			independent Protectionist Party	1887–1900	Malmöhus County, Gothenburg and Bohus County
Carl Berglund	1859–1921	editor-in-chief	Farmers' League	1919	Skaraborg County
Enar Berglund			Social Democratic Party	1937–1938	Västernorrland and Jämtland Counties
Fredrik Berglund			Free-minded National Association	1912–1919	Östergötland County
Helge Berglund			Social Democratic Party	1968–1970	City of Stockholm
Jan Berglund			Social Democratic Party	1912–1915; 1919–1929	City of Stockholm
Carl Otto Bergman			independent Protectionist Party	1881–1883; 1889–1901	Västerbotten County, Norrbotten County
Ingebrikt Bergman			Free-minded National Association; Free-minded People's Party	1922–1924	Västernorrland and Jämtland Counties
Johan Bergman			Free-minded National Association; Free-minded People's Party; People's Party	1918–1919; 1923–1941	Värmland County
Sven Peter Bergman			independent	1867–1874	Norrbotten County
Oscar Bergmark			independent	1898–1898	Älvsborg County
Thorwald Bergquist			People's Party	1943–1947	Södermanland and Västmanland Counties
Olof Bergqvist			National Party; National Organization of the Right	1912–1938	Norrbotten County, Västerbotten and Norrbotten Counties
Carl Fredrik Bergstedt			independent	1867–1875	Östergötland County
Gösta Bergstrand			Social Democratic Party	1968–1968	Kopparberg County
Albert Bergström			Protectionist Party; United Right Party; Social Democratic Party	1902–1911; 1919–1940	Värmland County, Östergötland County
Axel Bergström			independent Minority Party	1882–1893	Örebro County
David Bergström			Free-minded National Association; Free-minded People's Party	1912–1915; 1925–1932	Östergötland County
Gustaf Bergström			Farmers' National Organization	1919–1920	Blekinge County
Wilhelm Bergström			independent	1895–1900	Värmland County
John Bergvall			People's Party	1946–1959	City of Stockholm
Jakob Berlin			Minority Party; Moderate Party of the Upper House	1897–1908	Västerbotten County
Nils Johan Berlin			independent	1867–1873	Malmöhus County
Edwin Berling			Social Democratic Party	1929–1951	Malmöhus County
John Bernström			independent	1905–1908	Stockholm County
Olof Berntson			Social Democratic Party	1941–1941	Västernorrland and Jämtland Counties
Alfred Bexell			independent Protectionist Party	1884–1888	Halland County
Elof Biesèrt			Free-minded National Association	1911–1911	Värmland County
Niklas Biesèrt			independent	1883–1891	Jämtland County
Gillis Bildt	1820–1894	reichsmarschall, prime minister	independent	1967–1874; 1887–1894	City of Stockholm
Knut Gillis Bildt			Protectionist Party	1900–1908	Norrbotten County
Gottfrid Billing			Protectionist Party; United Right Party; National Party	1889–1906; 1908–1914	Västmanland County, Älvsborg County
Tore Billman			People's Party	1962–1965	Gothenburg and Bohus County
Lars Billström			independent	1867–1871	Malmöhus County
Henning Biörklund			Moderate Party of the Upper House; National Party	1910–1911; 1913–1915	Västerbotten County
Emanuel Birke			Rightist Party	1956–1962	Stockholm and Uppsala Counties
Georg Bissmark			National Party	1927–1934	Kronoberg and Halland Counties
Carl Björck			Protectionist Party; United Right Party	1905–1911	Halland County
Gustaf Björck			independent	1867–1867	Gothenburg and Bohus County
John Björck			Free-minded People's Party; People's Party	1931–1953	Älvsborg County
Wilhelm Björck			Social Democratic Party	1927–1938	Södermanland and Västmanland Counties
Knut Björkenstam			Conservative Group independent	1867–1877; 1890–1891	Västmanland County
August Björklund			independent	1876–1877	Skaraborg County
Olof Björklund			Minority Party; Moderate Party of the Upper House	1903–1911	Jämtland County
Alexis Björkman			Social Democratic Party	1919–1926	Västmanland County, Södermanland and Västmanland Counties
Gustaf Adolf Björkman			National Party; National Organization of the Right	1933–1940	Östergötland County
Gustav Björkman			Rightist Party	1936–1949	Värmland County
Gustaf Björlin			Protectionist Party	1896–1909	Gotland County
Tor Björnberg			Rightist Party	1952–1955	Kalmar and Gotland Counties
Edvard Björnsson		senior lecturer	Social Democratic Party	1930–1937; 1946–1953	Älvsborg County
Magnus Björnstjerna			independent	1867–1875	Kalmar County Southern
Oscar Björnstjerna			independent Minority Party	1874–1901	City of Stockholm
Emanuel Bjurström			Free-minded People's Party; People's Party	1929–1939	Kopparberg County
Lennart Blom			People's Party	1968–1968	Skaraborg County
Ernst Blomberg			Social Democratic Party	1911–1911	Gävleborg County
Hugo Blomberg			Protectionist Party	1894–1909	Kopparberg County
Per Blomquist			Rightist Party	1965–1970	Malmöhus County
Carl Boberg			National Party	1912–1931	Kalmar County Southern, Kalmar and Gotland Counties
Gunnar Bodin			Farmers' National Organization; Farmers' League	1920–1943	Gotland County, Kalmar and Gotland Counties
Karl Bodin			National Party; National Organization of the Right	1933–1941	Värmland County
Erik Boheman			People's Party	1959–1970	City of Gothenburg
Gösta Bohman			Moderate Party	1970–1970	City of Stockholm
Edvard Bohnstedt			Protectionist Party; United Right Party	1905–1911	Södermanland County
Knut Bohnstedt			Protectionist Party; United Right Party	1888–1911	Örebro County
Gustaf Boman			Moderate Party of the Upper House; National Party	1906–1911; 1918–1934	City of Gothenburg
Rudolf Boman			People's Party	1953–1965	Jönköping County
Sven Boman			Social Democratic Party	1939–1950	Kopparberg County
Carl Bonde, see Carl Trolle-Bonde
Bonde Bondeson			National Party	1914–1917	Malmöhus County
Lennart Bondeson			Rightist Party	1939–1947	Malmöhus County
Nils Anton Bondeson			Free-minded National Association; Liberal Party of Sweden	1919–1926	Kronoberg County, Kronoberg and Halland Counties
Per Bondesson			Protectionist Party	1892–1907	Malmöhus County
Theodor Borell			National Party; National Organization of the Right	1917–1938	Stockholm County, Stockholm and Uppsala Counties
Fredrik Theodor Borg			independent Minority Party	1885–1892	Malmöhus County
Oscar Borge			Social Democratic Party	1920–1921	City of Stockholm
Lars Borggren			Social Democratic Party	1932–1932	Blekinge and Kristianstad Counties
Nils Bosæus			Moderate Party of the Upper House	1909–1911	Norrbotten County
Erik Gustaf Boström			Protectionist Party	1894–1907	Stockholm County
Filip Boström			independent Protectionist Party; Moderate Party of the Upper House	1887–1908	Södermanland County
Johan Boström			independent Protectionist Party	1886–1889; 1892–1907	Skaraborg County
Erik Gottfrid Christian Brandt			Social Democratic Party	1939–1943	Kopparberg County
Gunnar Brånstad			Social Democratic Party	1955–1955	Blekinge and Kristianstad Counties
Georg Branting			Social Democratic Party	1932–1961	City of Stockholm
Gustaf von Braun			independent	1871–1879	Skaraborg County
Wilhelm Brehmer			Protectionist Party	1890–1904	Gävleborg County
Oscar Bremberg			Minority Party; Moderate Party of the Upper House	1895–1903; 1907–1908	Västerbotten County
Wilhelm Broman			National Party	1918–1919	City of Stockholm
Olof Bruce			Free-minded National Association	1912–1917	Malmöhus County
August Bruhn			Free-minded National Association	1921–1921	Kristianstad County
Fredric Brummer			independent	1867–1875	Halland County
Julius Brun			independent	1869–1876	Gävleborg County
Fredrik Brusewitz			independent Ehrenheimian Party	1867–1875	Älvsborg County
Sture Bruzelius			Protectionist Party	1892–1900	Kristianstad County
Pontus af Burén			independent Protectionist Party	1870–1871; 1887–1904	Östergötland County
Axel Burenstam			independent	1876–1886	Örebro County

== C ==
Representative	Lifespan	Profession	Party	Years	Constituency
Torsten Caap			Rightist Party	1939–1943	Västerbotten and Norrbotten Counties
Per Carlberg			Protectionist Party; United Right Party; National Party	1905–1914	Örebro County
Fredrik Daniel Carlborg			independent	1888–1891	Gothenburg and Bohus County
Eduard Carleson			independent	1874–1884	Kalmar County Northern
Carl Carlheim-Gyllensköld			independent	1868–1868; 1879–1885	Kristianstad County
Theodor Carlheim-Gyllensköld			independent	1881–1888	Halland County
Ingeborg Carlqvist			Social Democratic Party	1951–1968	Malmöhus County
F. F. Carlson			independent Centre of the Upper House	1873–1887	Gävleborg County
Arne Carlsson			Social Democratic Party	1970–1970	Gävleborg County
Carl Carlsson			Free-minded National Association; Free-minded People's Party; People's Party	1922–1936	Gävleborg County
Carl Eric Carlsson			independent	1876–1878	Västmanland County
Erik Carlsson			Centre Party	1958–1970	Kopparberg County
Georg Carlsson			Farmers' League	1953–1963	Södermanland and Västmanland Counties
Harry Carlsson			People's Party	1963–1967	Skaraborg County
Johan Carlsson			National Party	1914–1919	Värmland County
Johan Gustaf Carlsson			Social Democratic Party	1921–1923	Blekinge County
Lars Magnus Carlsson			independent	1883–1888	Kalmar County Southern
Olof Carlsson			Social Democratic Party	1922–1923	Blekinge and Kristianstad Counties
Olof Carlsson			Social Democratic Party	1930–1945	City of Stockholm
Oscar Carlsson			Social Democratic Party	1956–1970	Värmland County
Carl Fredrik Carlström			Rightist Party	1935–1946	Västerbotten and Norrbotten Counties
Otto Carlsund			independent	1879–1882	Älvsborg County
Edvard Casparsson			independent Protectionist Party	1867–1872; 1882–1899	Uppsala County
Johan Fredrik Caspersson			independent	1867–1875	Kalmar County Southern
Knut Cassel			independent	1867–1869; 1872–1878	Örebro County
Henrik Cavalli			Protectionist Party; United Right Party; National Party	1890–1917	Malmöhus County
Axel Cederberg			independent Minority Party; Moderate Party of the Upper House	1885–1907	Västerbotten County
Allan Cederborg			Liberal Party of Sweden	1929–1929	City of Stockholm
Conrad Cedercrantz			independent Moderate Party of the Upper House; National Party	1904–1918	Kalmar County Northern
Anders Cederström			independent	1867–1875	Stockholm County
Claes Cederström			independent	1882–1882	Kronoberg County
Christen Christenson			independent	1886–1889	Malmöhus County
Hjalmar Claëson			Minority Party	1885–1893	Kopparberg County
Sam Clason			Protectionist Party; United Right Party; National Party	1907–1919	Västmanland County
Sam Clason			National Party	1922–1925	City of Stockholm
Jeppe Clemedtson			National Party	1924–1931	Blekinge and Kristianstad Counties
Tycho Colleen			Rightist Party	1936–1937	Älvsborg County
Hjalmar Croneborg			independent	1867–1870	Skaraborg County
Wilhelm Croneborg			independent	1867–1884	Värmland County
Fredrik Cronstedt			Conservative Group independent	1867–1869	Västmanland County
Jesper Crusebjörn			independent	1894–1896; 1904–1904	Västerbotten County

== D ==
Representative	Lifespan	Profession	Party	Years	Constituency
Adolf Dahl			National Party	1912–1919; 1924–1930	Kristianstad County, Blekinge and Kristianstad Counties
Einar Dahl			Social Democratic Party	1958–1970	Gothenburg and Bohus County
Frans Dahl			independent Protectionist Party	1883–1888	Älvsborg County
Georg Dahl			independent	1926–1928	Värmland County
Thure Dahlberg			Social Democratic Party	1962–1970	Västerbotten and Norrbotten Counties
Olle Dahlén			People's Party	1964–1970	City of Stockholm
Carl Dahlström			Social Democratic Party	1937–1948	Södermanland and Västmanland Counties
Leonard Dahm			independent	1873–1883	Kalmar County Southern
Erik Dalberg			Social Democratic Party	1915–1935	Kopparberg County
Karl Damström			Social Democratic Party	1947–1967	Kopparberg County
Axel Danckwardt-Lillieström			independent	1899–1903	Östergötland County
Oscar Danielsson			Social Democratic Party	1935–1938	Stockholm and Uppsala Counties
Einar Danmans			People's Party	1954–1960	Gävleborg County
Ludvig Danström			independent National Party	1908–1919	Halland County
Arvid De Geer			Farmers' League	1940–1946	Blekinge and Kristianstad Counties
Emanuel De Geer			independent	1874–1877	Uppsala County
Fabian De Geer			independent National Party	1911–1917	Skaraborg County
Gerard De Geer			People's Party	1950–1957	Värmland County
Gerhard Louis De Geer			Minority Party; Moderate Party of the Upper House; Free-minded National Association independent	1901–1914	Kristianstad County
Louis De Geer			independent	1884–1887	Älvsborg County
Louis Gerhard De Geer			independent Scanian Party; Centre of the Upper House	1867–1888	City of Stockholm
Johan De la Gardie			independent	1892–1895	Kristianstad County
Magnus De la Gardie			independent	1896–1904	Kristianstad County
Robert De la Gardie			independent	1880–1888	Östergötland County
Axel Dickson			independent	1867–1870	Östergötland County
Charles Dickson			Minority Party	1867–1872; 1886–1895	Gothenburg and Bohus County, City of Gothenburg
Robert Dickson			Minority Party	1892–1903	Jönköping County, City of Malmö
Johan Dieden			independent Moderate Party of the Upper House	1900–1910	City of Malmö
Ingrid Diesen			Rightist Party	1967–1969	City of Stockholm
Ludvig Douglas			Protectionist Party; United Right Party	1891–1901; 1907–1911	Östergötland County
Wilhelm Dufwa			Upper House branch of the Lantmanna Party independent	1873–1879; 1882–1883	Kristianstad County, Gothenburg and Bohus County

== E ==
Representative	Lifespan	Profession	Party	Years	Constituency
Sven Edin			Social Democratic Party	1941–1952	Västernorrland and Jämtland Counties
Gunnar Edström			People's Party	1957–1968	Malmöhus County
Gustaf Edström			independent	1903–1903	Västerbotten County
Viktor Egnell			Farmers' League	1936–1943	Skaraborg County
Casper Ehrenborg			independent	1890–1892; 1896–1901	Kristianstad County
Gustaf Adam Ehrengranat			independent	1867–1868	Halland County
Pehr von Ehrenheim			independent Ehrenheimian Party; Minority Party	1867–1902	Uppsala County
Albert Ehrensvärd			Minority Party; Scanian Party	1867–1874; 1877–1885	Gothenburg and Bohus County
Gustaf Ehrnberg			National Party; National Organization of the Right	1931–1939	Blekinge and Kristianstad Counties
Gustaf Ekdahl			Protectionist Party	1888–1905	Stockholm County
Gunnar Ekelund			Protectionist Party; United Right Party; National Party	1908–1919	Östergötland County
Fredrik Ekenman			independent	1867–1872	Jönköping County
Thor Ekenman			independent	1882–1890	Jönköping County
Victor Ekenman			independent Protectionist Party	1885–1893	Älvsborg County
Theodor af Ekenstam			Protectionist Party; United Right Party; National Party	1899–1915	Gotland County
Fritz Ekholm			Social Democratic Party	1941–1941	Östergötland County
Anton Eklund			Social Democratic Party	1941–1946	Södermanland and Västmanland Counties
Ludvig Eklund			Protectionist Party	1898–1898	Östergötland County
Oskar Eklund			independent	1910–1911	City of Stockholm
Oskar Eklund			Free-minded National Association	1912–1918	Södermanland County
Carl Edvard Ekman			independent Scanian Party; Minority Party	1867–1893	Östergötland County
Carl Gustaf Ekman			Free-minded National Association	1911–1928	Gävleborg County, Stockholm and Uppsala Counties
Gustaf Ekman			independent	1867–1867	Värmland County
Janne Ekman			independent Scanian Party	1867–1882	Älvsborg County, City of Gothenburg
Johan Ekman			Free-minded National Association	1912–1919	Älvsborg County
Karl Ekman			Protectionist Party; United Right Party; National Party	1908–1933	Jönköping County
Oscar Ekman			independent	1883–1887	City of Gothenburg
Axel Ekstedt			independent	1880–1881	Gothenburg and Bohus County
Bernhard Ekström			Farmers' League	1948–1948	Kronoberg and Halland Counties
Carl Ekström			independent	1880–1882	Jönköping County
Ivar Ekströmer			Rightist Party	1936–1948	Kronoberg and Halland Counties
Melcher Ekströmer			Protectionist Party; United Right Party	1896–1911	Kalmar County Southern
Gösta Elfving			Social Democratic Party	1954–1957	City of Stockholm
Gustaf Eliasson			Free-minded National Association	1912–1919	Kristianstad County
Lars Eliasson			Farmers' League	1952–1958	Kopparberg County
Anders Elisson			Farmers' National Organization; Farmers' League	1919–1928	Halland County, Kronoberg and Halland Counties
Bengt Elmgren			Social Democratic Party	1941–1966	Östergötland County
Gustaf Elofsson			Farmers' League	1940–1967	Blekinge and Kristianstad Counties
Nils Elowsson			Social Democratic Party	1940–1963	Blekinge and Kristianstad Counties
Johan Eneroth			independent	1891–1892	Kristianstad County
Arthur Engberg			Social Democratic Party	1941–1944	Västernorrland and Jämtland Counties
Erik Englund			People's Party	1945–1958	City of Stockholm
Ivar Englund			Social Democratic Party	1936–1938	Kopparberg County
Suno Engström			independent	1888–1889	Gotland County
Erik August Enhörning			National Party	1922–1932	Västernorrland and Jämtland Counties
Frans Ericson			Social Democratic Party	1941–1948	Östergötland County
Hans Ericson			National Party	1912–1919	Blekinge County
John Ericson			independent	1882–1886	Älvsborg County
Oscar Ericson			Farmers' League	1922–1937	Jönköping County
Aaby Ericsson			Protectionist Party; United Right Party; National Party	1905–1921	Kronoberg County
Harald Ericsson			independent Protectionist Party	1885–1894	Örebro County
Herman Ericsson			Social Democratic Party	1937–1946	Malmöhus County
Ollas Anders Ericsson			National Party	1912–1921	Kopparberg County, Halland County
Arvid Erikson			Free-minded National Association	1921–1921	Stockholm County
Johannes Erikson			independent	1884–1885	Älvsborg County
Oskar Erikson			Social Democratic Party	1920–1921	City of Stockholm
Anders Eriksson i Undrom			Social Democratic Party	1944–1944	Västernorrland and Jämtland Counties
August Eriksson			United Right Party	1910–1911	Kopparberg County
Bertil Eriksson			Social Democratic Party	1941–1942	City of Stockholm
Carl Eriksson			Social Democratic Party	1922–1952	Gävleborg County
Einar Eriksson			Social Democratic Party	1947–1970	Stockholm and Uppsala Counties
Erik Eriksson i Böleå			Free-minded National Association	1922–1922	Västerbotten and Norrbotten Counties
Johan Albert Eriksson			Social Democratic Party	1921–1921	Jönköping County
Karl Erik Eriksson			People's Party	1966–1968	Värmland County
Valfrid Eriksson			National Party	1926–1932	Värmland County
Tage Erlander			Social Democratic Party	1945–1948	Malmöhus County
August Ernfors			National Party; National Organization of the Right	1928–1937	Kopparberg County
Gudmund Ernulf			People's Party	1965–1970	City of Gothenburg
Ernst Eskhult			Farmers' League	1919–1943	Skaraborg County
Carl Eskilsson			Rightist Party	1949–1970	Östergötland County
Carl von Essen			Free-minded National Association	1918–1919	Jämtland County
Fredrik von Essen			independent Scanian Party; Protectionist Party	1867–1874; 1877–1906	Skaraborg County, Älvsborg County
Reinhold von Essen			independent	1880–1888; 1890–1891	Skaraborg County
Albert Evers			independent	1891–1892	Älvsborg County
Oscar Evers			independent	1879–1887; 1889–1894	Örebro County, Gothenburg and Bohus County
Knut Ewerlöf			Rightist Party	1938–1961	City of Stockholm
Waldemar Ewerlöf			independent Moderate Party of the Upper House	1904–1910	City of Malmö

== F ==
Representative	Lifespan	Profession	Party	Years	Constituency
Axel Fagerholm			Protectionist Party	1892–1901	Jönköping County
Axel Fagerlin			National Party	1914–1919	Norrbotten County
Emil Fagerlund			Social Democratic Party	1921–1921	Gävleborg County
Lars Fagerström			Social Democratic Party	1960–1961	Älvsborg County
Gustaf Fahlander			Social Democratic Party	1942–1963	Södermanland and Västmanland Counties
Pontus Fahlbeck			Protectionist Party; Moderate Party of the Upper House	1903–1911	Gothenburg and Bohus County
Olof Fåhræus			independent	1867–1878	Gothenburg and Bohus County
Helmer Falk			independent	1885–1901	Värmland County
Karl Falk			Social Democratic Party	1949–1956	Östergötland County
Knut Falk			Protectionist Party	1899–1905	Kopparberg County
Otto Falk			independent	1868–1875	Värmland County
Wilhelm Falk			Minority Party	1876–1893	Kopparberg County
Henrik Falkenberg			Protectionist Party; United Right Party; National Party	1901–1913	Värmland County
Melker Falkenberg af Bålby			independent	1884–1887	Östergötland County
Thorbjörn Fälldin			Centre Party	1967–1968	Örebro County
Fredrik Fant			National Party	1917–1919	Stockholm County
Arvid Faxe			independent	1867–1873	Jönköping County
Martin Fehr			Free-minded National Association; Liberal Party of Sweden	1923–1930	Stockholm and Uppsala Counties
Carl Fehrman			independent	1892–1898	Halland County
Elis Fischer			independent	1886–1886	City of Stockholm
Sixten Flach			Protectionist Party	1889–1897	Östergötland County
Edvard Fleetwood			National Party	1919–1919	Kalmar County Northern
Victor Fleetwood			independent	1867–1868	Kalmar County Northern
Herman Fleming			Protectionist Party; United Right Party; National Party	1908–1924	Östergötland County
Ernst Flensburg			National Party	1917–1917	Blekinge County
Hulda Flood			Social Democratic Party	1948–1949	Värmland County
Ethel Florén-Winther			Moderate Party	1970–1970	City of Stockholm
Nils Fock			independent Protectionist Party	1878–1900	Skaraborg County
Jakob Fogelin			independent	1880–1886	Skaraborg County
Wilhelm Fogelmarck			independent	1878–1879	Gävleborg County
Victor Folin			Protectionist Party	1905–1908	Gävleborg County
Albert Forslund			Social Democratic Party	1931–1951	Stockholm and Uppsala Counties
Johan August Forss			Free-minded National Association	1911–1914	Skaraborg County
Erik Forssberg			National Party	1927–1934	Blekinge and Kristianstad Counties
Carl Forssell			National Party; National Organization of the Right	1930–1937	City of Stockholm
Hans Forssell			independent Minority Party	1880–1897	Gävleborg County
Otto Forssell			independent Protectionist Party	1880–1888	Västmanland County
Lars Forssman			independent	1886–1890	City of Stockholm
Per Forssman			National Party	1912–1919	Gotland County
Niklas Fosser			independent Protectionist Party	1883–1887; 1894–1907	Östergötland County
Eduard Fränckel			Protectionist Party; Moderate Party of the Upper House	1889–1911	City of Stockholm
Anders Olof Frändén			National Party; National Organization of the Right	1918–1940	Jämtland County, Västernorrland and Jämtland Counties
Nils Franzén			Farmers' League	1952–1959	Kalmar and Gotland Counties
Laur Franzon			Social Democratic Party	1939–1956	Stockholm and Uppsala Counties
Carl von Friesen			Ministerial Group; Moderate Party of the Upper House	1897–1905	City of Stockholm
Sixten von Friesen			independent Free-minded National Association	1905–1915	City of Stockholm
Karl Friman			Protectionist Party	1904–1908	Skaraborg County
Edvard Frisk			independent	1868–1877	Gävleborg County
Christian Fröberg			independent Minority Party; Moderate Party of the Upper House	1877–1879; 1881–1905	Västernorrland County
Nils Fröman			independent	1867–1882	Kopparberg County
Fredrik Alexander Funck			independent	1867–1874	Östergötland County

== G ==
Representative	Lifespan	Profession	Party	Years	Constituency
Nils Gabrielsson			Farmers' League; National Party; National Organization of the Right	1922–1946	Västerbotten and Norrbotten Counties
Henric Gahn			independent	1875–1892	Kopparberg County
Natanael Gärde			People's Party	1938–1945	City of Stockholm
Ingrid Gärde Widemar			People's Party	1954–1960	City of Stockholm
Herman von Gegerfelt			independent	1867–1879	Jönköping County
Arne Geijer			Social Democratic Party	1955–1970	Stockholm and Uppsala Counties
Bror von Geijer			independent	1867–1877	Kristianstad County
Christofer Wilhelm Geijer			independent	1871–1872	Värmland County
Knut von Geijer			Moderate Party of the Upper House; National Party; National Organization of the Right	1909–1936	Malmöhus County
Lennart Geijer			Social Democratic Party	1962–1970	City of Stockholm
Oscar Geijer			independent	1867–1873	Älvsborg County
Carl Fredrik af Geijerstam			independent	1876–1878	Skaraborg County
Edvard Gelin			Free-minded National Association	1915–1917	Värmland County
Ernfrid Gelotte			Free-minded National Association	1912–1915	Jönköping County
Birger Gezelius			Rightist Party	1960–1961	Kopparberg County
Emil Gezelius			Protectionist Party; United Right Party; National Party	1908–1919	Kopparberg County
Gustaf Gilljam			independent Protectionist Party	1887–1896; 1903–1907	Gävleborg County, Uppsala County
Anselm Gillström			Social Democratic Party	1941–1968	Västernorrland and Jämtland Counties
Axel Gjöres			Social Democratic Party	1943–1950	Kronoberg and Halland Counties
Anders Göransson			Moderate Party of the Upper House; National Party	1911–1911; 1917–1918	Gävleborg County
Hardy Göransson			People's Party	1948–1955	Blekinge and Kristianstad Counties
Stig Gorthon			Rightist Party	1961–1964	Malmöhus County
Frithiof Grafström			independent	1875–1883	Västerbotten County
Per Granath			Social Democratic Party	1929–1944	Gävleborg County
Petrus Gränebo			Farmers' National Organization; Farmers' League	1919–1951	Kalmar County Southern, Kalmar and Gotland Counties
Josef Granström			Free-minded People's Party	1928–1932	Västernorrland and Jämtland Counties
Erik Magnus Grenholm			independent	1886–1888	Jämtland County
Carl Grevesmühl			Farmers' League	1919–1921	Västmanland County
Johan Gripenstedt			Protectionist Party; United Right Party; National Party	1892–1918	Örebro County
Johan Gripenstedt			National Party	1912–1918	Örebro County
Lennart Groll			Protectionist Party	1892–1896	Kalmar County Northern
Allan Grönkvist			Social Democratic Party	1954–1957	Värmland County
Karl Grubbström			Free-minded National Association independent	1912–1915	Västerbotten County
Leonard Grundberg			Protectionist Party	1894–1909	Älvsborg County
Jakob Grym			Social Democratic Party	1945–1961	Västerbotten and Norrbotten Counties
Wilhelm Gullberg			Free-minded National Association	1912–1919	Skaraborg County
Fritiof Gustafsson			Rightist Party	1928–1943	Skaraborg County
Gustaf Gustafsson			National Party	1919–1919	Kalmar County Northern
Karl Johan Gustafsson			Protectionist Party; United Right Party; National Party	1909–1933	Jönköping County
Nils-Eric Gustafsson			Farmers' League	1957–1970	Västerbotten and Norrbotten Counties
Per Gustafsson			Farmers' League	1922–1942	Kronoberg and Halland Counties
John Gustavson			Farmers' League	1934–1949	Gothenburg and Bohus County
Bengt Gustavsson			Social Democratic Party	1958–1970	Södermanland and Västmanland Counties
Fredric Gyllenkrook			independent	1869–1872	Kristianstad County
Henric Gyllenram			independent	1867–1874	Gotland County
Henrik Gyllenram			independent	1886–1888	Värmland County
Eric Gyllenstierna			independent	1867–1867	Kristianstad County
Johan Gyllenstierna			independent Moderate Party of the Upper House; National Party	1907–1914	Kristianstad County
August Gyllensvaan			independent	1867–1867; 1873–1874	Gothenburg and Bohus County

== H ==
Representative	Lifespan	Profession	Party	Years	Constituency
Erik Hagberg			Rightist Party	1956–1963	Malmöhus County
Elof Hagberth			Rightist Party	1937–1938	Malmöhus County
Ernst Hage			Social Democratic Party	1943–1949	Västerbotten and Norrbotten Counties
Edvard Hagfält			Social Democratic Party	1919–1922	Uppsala County
Erik Häggström			independent	1870–1874	Västerbotten County
Josef Hagman			Rightist Party	1944–1947	Östergötland County
Oskar Hagman			Social Democratic Party	1930–1942	City of Stockholm
Julius Hagström			Free-minded National Association	1912–1912	Västernorrland County
Leonard Hagström			National Party; National Organization of the Right	1934–1940	Västernorrland and Jämtland Counties
Anton Hahn			Free-minded National Association	1912–1914	Örebro County
Edvin Håkanson			Protectionist Party; United Right Party	1904–1910	Älvsborg County
Ernst Håkanson			Protectionist Party; Moderate Party of the Upper House	1909–1911	Kristianstad County
Nils Håkansson			Protectionist Party	1892–1895	Kristianstad County
Fritz Hallberg			Moderate Party of the Upper House; National Party	1911–1916	City of Malmö
Magnus Hallenborg			independent	1867–1892	Malmöhus County
Erik Hallgren			independent	1895–1899	Södermanland County
Elof Hällgren			Social Democratic Party	1948–1955	Blekinge and Kristianstad Counties
Eric Hallin			Protectionist Party; United Right Party; National Party independent	1908–1933	Gothenburg and Bohus County
Olof Hallin			independent	1871–1874	Kopparberg County
Walther von Hallwyl			Protectionist Party	1897–1905	Gävleborg County
Hjalmar Halvarsson			National Party	1931–1933	Gävleborg County
Alexander Hamilton			Protectionist Party; United Right Party; National Party	1907–1919	Västmanland County
Gilbert Hamilton			independent	1879–1887	Skaraborg County
Henning Hamilton			Conservative Group independent	1867–1881	Södermanland County
Hugo Hamilton			independent Scanian Party	1867–1875	Skaraborg County
Hugo Hamilton the Elder			independent	1867–1870	Örebro County
Hugo Hamilton the Younger			independent	1871–1885	Örebro County
Hugo Hamilton			Moderate Party of the Upper House; National Party independent	1908–1928	City of Gävle, Älvsborg County
Raoul Hamilton			Protectionist Party independent	1892–1908	Kristianstad County
Carl Hammar			independent	1867–1870; 1873–1880; 1882–1885	Halland County
Carl Hammarhjelm			independent	1867–1884	Värmland County
Emil Hammarlund			independent	1910–1910	City of Stockholm
Carl Hammarskjöld			independent	1895–1897	City of Stockholm
Carl Gustaf Hammarskjöld			National Party	1925–1932	Östergötland County
Hjalmar Hammarskjöld			independent	1923–1938	Stockholm and Uppsala Counties
Hugo Hammarskjöld			independent Moderate Party of the Upper House; National Party	1909–1918	Kalmar County Northern
Alexis Hammarström			independent Protectionist Party; United Right Party; National Party	1903–1911; 1914–1919	Gothenburg and Bohus County, Kronoberg County
Felix Hamrin			Free-minded People's Party; People's Party	1934–1937	Jönköping County
Ruth Hamrin-Thorell			People's Party	1955–1970	Stockholm and Uppsala Counties
David Hansén			Free-minded National Association; Free-minded People's Party; People's Party	1919–1920; 1928–1938	Norrbotten County, Västerbotten and Norrbotten Counties
Per-Olof Hanson			People's Party	1958–1964	City of Stockholm
Anders Hansson i Ravlunda			Rightist Party	1939–1939	Blekinge and Kristianstad Counties
Frans Hansson			Rightist Party	1942–1943	Gothenburg and Bohus County
Jacob Hansson			Social Democratic Party	1933–1945	Blekinge and Kristianstad Counties
Måns Hansson			independent	1885–1886	Malmöhus County
Nils Hansson			People's Party	1952–1967	Blekinge and Kristianstad Counties
Peter Hansson			independent	1898–1901	Halland County
Sigfrid Hansson			Social Democratic Party	1919–1937	Gothenburg and Bohus County
Sven Hansson			Social Democratic Party	1939–1944	Västerbotten and Norrbotten Counties
Carl Alger Härdin			Social Democratic Party	1936–1942	Södermanland and Västmanland Counties
Carl Hasselrot			independent	1867–1874; 1880–1887	Älvsborg County
Carl Birger Hasselrot			Protectionist Party; United Right Party	1889–1910	Kalmar County Southern
Johan August Hazelius			independent	1868–1871	Västerbotten County
Staffan Hedblom			People's Party	1959–1961	City of Stockholm
Axel Hedborg			Moderate Party of the Upper House	1904–1906	Västerbotten County
Robert von Hedenberg			independent Protectionist Party	1886–1894	Västerbotten County
Erik Hedenby			Social Democratic Party	1950–1952	Malmöhus County
Axel Hedenlund			Protectionist Party; United Right Party; National Party	1907–1919	Älvsborg County
Ernst Hedenstierna			Protectionist Party; United Right Party; National Party	1909–1919	Skaraborg County
Hugo Hedenstierna			Protectionist Party	1899–1907	Östergötland County
Johan Alfred Hedenström			Free-minded National Association	1916–1919	Östergötland County
Carl Hederstierna			National Party	1922–1926	City of Stockholm
Fredrik Hederstierna			independent Scanian Party	1869–1877; 1879–1887	Jönköping County, Gothenburg and Bohus County
Rune Hedlund			Social Democratic Party	1964–1970	Södermanland and Västmanland Counties
Sven Adolf Hedlund			Upper House branch of the Lantmanna Party independent	1875–1876; 1886–1889	Gothenburg and Bohus County
Uno Hedström			Social Democratic Party	1956–1970	Västerbotten and Norrbotten Counties
Arthur Heiding			Farmers' League	1936–1951	Kalmar and Gotland Counties
Selim Heijkenskjöld			independent	1867–1871	Örebro County
Erik von Heland			Farmers' League	1932–1952	Södermanland and Västmanland Counties
Adolf Helander			independent	1890–1898	Södermanland County
Gunnar Helén			People's Party	1970–1970	City of Stockholm
Ragnar Helgesson			Social Democratic Party	1942–1945	City of Stockholm
Mauritz Hellberg			Free-minded National Association; Liberal Party of Sweden	1911–1925; 1928–1933	Värmland County
Arvid Hellebladh			Social Democratic Party	1957–1967	Kalmar and Gotland Counties
Johannes Hellner			Moderate Party of the Upper House; United Right Party	1910–1911	Västernorrland County
Paul Hellström			Free-minded National Association	1915–1927	Norrbotten County, Västerbotten and Norrbotten Counties
Anders Henrikson			Farmers' League	1929–1936	Malmöhus County
Oskar Herdin			Protectionist Party	1905–1909	Kopparberg County
Jonas Herlenius			independent	1867–1867	Värmland County
Nils Herlitz			Rightist Party	1939–1955	Stockholm and Uppsala Counties
Albert Hermansson			Social Democratic Party	1949–1956	Östergötland County
Herbert Hermansson			Farmers' League	1950–1970	Gothenburg and Bohus County
Axel Hermelin			independent	1867–1868	Jönköping County
Richard Hermelin			National Party	1913–1919	Halland County
Allan Hernelius			Rightist Party	1962–1970	City of Stockholm
Hugo Hernlund			Moderate Party of the Upper House	1910–1911	City of Stockholm
Knut Hesselbom			Social Democratic Party	1946–1958	Älvsborg County
Kerstin Hesselgren			Free-minded National Association independent	1922–1934	City of Gothenburg, Örebro County
Elis Heüman			Protectionist Party	1907–1908	Halland County
Gustaf Heüman			Social Democratic Party	1934–1957	Jönköping County
Fredrik Hierta			independent	1879–1885	Skaraborg County
Karl Hildebrand			Moderate Party of the Upper House	1909–1910	Blekinge County
Per Hilding			People's Party	1961–1968	Gävleborg County
Anton Hjalmarsson			Social Democratic Party	1931–1936	Malmöhus County
Nils Hjorth			Social Democratic Party	1962–1970	Stockholm and Uppsala Counties
Carl Hochschild			Scanian Party	1878–1886	Malmöhus County
Erland von Hofsten			independent	1867–1867	Örebro County
Nils von Hofsten			independent	1867–1875	Skaraborg County
Ivar Högström			Social Democratic Party	1966–1970	Västernorrland and Jämtland Counties
Sven Hollertz			Rightist Party	1948–1948	Östergötland County
Anders Reinhold Holm			Lantmannapartiet; Old Lantmanna Party	1885–1890	Halland County
Ulrik Holm			National Party	1916–1917	Jämtland County
Åke Holmbäck			People's Party	1942–1952	Värmland County, Jönköping County
Carl Holmberg			independent	1867–1868; 1873–1878	Kronoberg County
Nils Holmberg	1902–1981	writer, journalist, editor-in-chief	Communist Party	1944–1946	City of Gothenburg
Yngve Holmberg			Rightist Party	1962–1968	City of Stockholm
Israel Holmgren			Free-minded People's Party	1926–1933	Gothenburg and Bohus County
Fredrik Holmquist			Free-minded National Association	1912–1920	Kopparberg County
Eric Holmqvist			Social Democratic Party	1953–1970	Malmöhus County
Nils Holmström			Rightist Party	1937–1944	Gävleborg County
Allan Holstenson			Farmers' League	1934–1943	Jönköping County
Rudolph Horn af Rantzien			independent	1875–1878	Gotland County
Nils Hörstadius			Rightist Party	1930–1937	Älvsborg County
Gunnar Hübinette			Rightist Party	1963–1970	Stockholm and Uppsala Counties
Christopher Huldt			independent	1884–1885	Västerbotten County
Adam Hult			Free-minded National Association	1912–1923	Västmanland County, Södermanland and Västmanland Counties
Carl Gustaf Hult			Protectionist Party; United Right Party	1908–1911	Kalmar County Southern
Mary Hultell			Rightist Party	1964–1969	City of Stockholm
Axel Hummel			independent	1902–1904	Kronoberg County
Karl Husberg			Minority Party independent	1891–1893; 1905–1906	Västerbotten County
Ragnar Huss			People's Party	1953–1957	Malmöhus County

== I ==
Representative	Lifespan	Profession	Party	Years	Constituency
Åke Ingeström			Free-minded National Association	1912–1928	Värmland County
John Ingmansson			Free-minded National Association	1911–1921	Blekinge County
Birger Isacson			Rightist Party	1961–1967	Kopparberg County

== J ==
Representative	Lifespan	Profession	Party	Years	Constituency
Gösta Jacobsson			Rightist Party	1961–1970	Malmöhus County
Per Jacobsson			People's Party	1955–1970	Västerbotten and Norrbotten Counties
Erik Jansson			Social Democratic Party	1952–1970	Stockholm and Uppsala Counties
Fridolf Jansson			Farmers' League	1951–1952	Kronoberg and Halland Counties
Johannes Jansson			independent	1874–1875	Älvsborg County
Johan Jeansson			independent	1891–1895	Kalmar County Southern
John Jeansson			National Party	1918–1927	Kalmar County Southern
Carl Jehander			independent	1895–1901	Jönköping County
John Jeppsson			independent	1902–1907	Kristianstad County
Jöns Jesperson			National Party	1918–1921	Malmöhus County
Ewald Johannesson			Social Democratic Party	1946–1953	City of Stockholm
Emil Johanson			Social Democratic Party	1929–1930	Stockholm and Uppsala Counties
Johan Johanson i Valared			United Right Party; National Party	1910–1915	Älvsborg County
Johan Johanson i Tväråselet			Farmers' National Organization	1921–1921	Norrbotten County
Karl Johanson			Social Democratic Party	1931–1954	Västerbotten and Norrbotten Counties
Anders Johansson			People's Party	1954–1961	Älvsborg County
August Johansson			Free-minded National Association; Free-minded People's Party; People's Party	1920–1935	Skaraborg County
Carl Johansson			Social Democratic Party	1919–1928	Malmöhus County
Ivar Johansson			Farmers' League	1957–1970	Östergötland County
Johan Johansson i Kälkebo			Farmers' League	1919–1921	Gävleborg County
Johan Johansson i Hornsberg			Free-minded National Association; Free-minded People's Party	1919–1932	Jämtland County, Västernorrland and Jämtland Counties
Johan Johansson i Friggeråker			Farmers' League	1930–1937	Älvsborg County
Johan Anton Johansson			independent National Party	1913–1919	Halland County
Johan Bernhard Johansson			National Party; National Organization of the Right	1919–1949	Halland County, Kronoberg and Halland Counties
Karl Johansson			Farmers' National Organization	1921–1921	Blekinge County
Karl Johansson			Rightist Party	1936–1943	Skaraborg County
Knut Johansson			Social Democratic Party	1957–1970	City of Stockholm
Robert Johansson			Farmers' League	1942–1942	Kronoberg and Halland Counties
Rune B. Johansson			Social Democratic Party	1951–1960	Kronoberg and Halland Counties
Tage Johansson			Social Democratic Party	1958–1970	Jönköping County
Theodor Johansson			Farmers' League	1954–1957	Jönköping County
Robert Johansson-Dahr			Free-minded People's Party	1931–1933	Jönköping County
Gunnel Jonäng			Centre Party	1969–1970	Gävleborg County
Bertil Jonasson			Centre Party	1958–1964	Värmland County
Ernst B. Jönson			Farmers' National Organization	1920–1921	Gothenburg and Bohus County
Erik Jonsson			Free-minded National Association	1912–1916; 1918–1919	Gävleborg County
Ewert Jonsson			Free-minded National Association; Free-minded People's Party; People's Party	1923–1938	Västerbotten and Norrbotten Counties
John Jonsson			Social Democratic Party	1948–1957	Kalmar and Gotland Counties
Jon N. Jonsson			Social Democratic Party	1945–1962	Gävleborg County
Olof Jonsson			Minority Party; Moderate Party of the Upper House; National Party	1904–1916	Gävleborg County
Rune Jonsson			Social Democratic Party	1969–1970	Västernorrland and Jämtland Counties
Anders Jönsson			independent	1876–1877	Älvsborg County
Birger Jönsson			National Party	1913–1918	Halland County
Johan Jönsson			Free-minded National Association	1919–1919	Kristianstad County
Jöns Jönsson			National Party; National Organization of the Right	1922–1936	Malmöhus County
Paul Jönsson			independent	1887–1892	Skaraborg County
Julius Juhlin			Protectionist Party; United Right Party	1908–1911	Östergötland County
Malcolm Juhlin			Free-minded National Association	1919–1920	Södermanland County
Herman Juhlin-Dannfelt			Moderate Party of the Upper House	1908–1909	Västerbotten County
Fredrik Julin			Farmers' League	1929–1933	Värmland County
Teodor Julin			Social Democratic Party	1920–1930	Gävleborg County, Stockholm and Uppsala Counties

== K ==
Representative	Lifespan	Profession	Party	Years	Constituency
Rolf Kaijser			Rightist Party	1958–1970	Värmland County
Robert Kajerdt			independent	1889–1892	Kalmar County Northern
Wilhelm Källman			Social Democratic Party	1933–1946	Stockholm and Uppsala Counties
Eric Källqvist			People's Party	1958–1965	Värmland County
Edvin Karlsson			Farmers' National Organization	1919–1919	Gothenburg and Bohus County
Fritiof Karlsson			Farmers' League	1949–1958	Kronoberg and Halland Counties
Göran Karlsson			Social Democratic Party	1954–1970	Jönköping County
Gottfrid Karlsson i Gillberga			Free-minded People's Party; People's Party	1926–1942	Örebro County
Gottfrid Karlsson			Social Democratic Party	1933–1953	Östergötland County
Gustaf Karlsson			Social Democratic Party	1942–1957	Gothenburg and Bohus County
Helge Karlsson			Social Democratic Party	1964–1970	Blekinge and Kristianstad Counties
John Karlsson			United Right Party; National Party	1910–1911; 1924–1928	Västmanland County, Södermanland and Västmanland Counties
Karl Karlsson i Göteborg			Free-minded National Association	1912–1917	City of Gothenburg
Karl Karlsson i Stockholm			Social Democratic Party	1938–1941	City of Stockholm
Ove Karlsson			Social Democratic Party	1968–1970	Kopparberg County
James Kennedy			Protectionist Party	1899–1908	Kristianstad County
Ingemar Kerfstedt			Protectionist Party	1889–1897	Halland County
Karl Kilsmo			People's Party	1964–1970	Södermanland and Västmanland Counties
Emil Kinander			Moderate Party of the Upper House	1907–1909	City of Stockholm
Edward Kinberg			Moderate Party of the Upper House	1905–1909	Västerbotten County
Carl August Kjellberg			United Right Party	1911–1911	City of Gothenburg
Jonas Kjellberg			independent United Right Party	1910–1911	Örebro County
Johan Kjellén			Farmers' League	1919–1921	Jönköping County
Rudolf Kjellén			independent	1911–1917	Kalmar County Southern
Bror Kjellgren			National Party	1913–1919	Östergötland County
Josua Kjellgren			independent	1899–1901	Östergötland County
Ernst Klefbeck			Social Democratic Party	1912–1937	City of Stockholm
Rudolf Klinckowström			Upper House branch of the Lantmanna Party; Protectionist Party	1878–1899	Älvsborg County
Herman Kling			Social Democratic Party	1962–1969	City of Stockholm, Gävleborg County
Carl Klingspor			Protectionist Party; United Right Party	1890–1911	Skaraborg County
Philip Klingspor			independent Protectionist Party; United Right Party; National Party	1887–1919	Östergötland County
Eric af Klint			independent	1867–1875; 1877–1877	Östergötland County, Älvsborg County
Gustaf Kobb			Free-minded National Association; Liberal Party of Sweden	1912–1931	Älvsborg County
Arthur Koch			independent	1875–1879; 1884–1887	Gothenburg and Bohus County
Gerhard Halfred von Koch			independent Free-minded National Association; Free-minded People's Party	1913–1926	Örebro County
Nils Samuel von Koch			independent	1867–1881	Blekinge County
Ludvig Kockum			independent	1877–1885; 1888–1896	Malmöhus County
Thorvald Köhlin			National Party	1912–1919	Älvsborg County
Emil Königsfeldt			independent	1882–1883; 1888–1891	Kopparberg County
Anders Koskull			independent	1867–1881	Kronoberg County
Robert von Kræmer			independent Minority Party	1877–1894; 1897–1903	Älvsborg County, Jämtland County
Axel Kristiansson			Centre Party	1964–1970	Kronoberg and Halland Counties
Svante Kristiansson			Social Democratic Party	1956–1970	Blekinge and Kristianstad Counties
Peter Krok			independent	1895–1899	City of Malmö
Johan Kronstrand			People's Party	1954–1963	Älvsborg County
Martin Kropp			Social Democratic Party	1926–1931	Blekinge and Kristianstad Counties
Edvard von Krusenstjerna			independent Minority Party	1885–1893	Värmland County
Jan Kuylenstjerna			independent	1867–1873	Skaraborg County
Herman Kvarnzelius			Free-minded National Association; Free-minded People's Party; People's Party	1912–1935	Västernorrland County, Västernorrland and Jämtland Counties

== L ==
Representative	Lifespan	Profession	Party	Years	Constituency
Fritjof Lager			Communist Party	1962–1965	City of Stockholm
Sven Lagerberg			independent	1867–1884	Älvsborg County
Gustaf Lagerbjelke	1817–1895		independent	1867–1894	Södermanland County
Gustaf Lagerbjelke	1860–1937		Moderate Party of the Upper House; United Right Party; National Party	1909–1930	Stockholm County, Stockholm and Uppsala Counties
Gustaf Lagerbring			Minority Party; Moderate Party of the Upper House; National Party	1900–1913	Gothenburg and Bohus County
Gustaf Lagercrantz			independent	1867–1867	Jämtland County
Israel Lagerfelt			National Party; National Organization of the Right	1930–1943	Östergötland County
Emil Lagerkvist			Free-minded National Association	1916–1919	Västerbotten County
Gerhard Lagerstråle			independent	1867–1884	Värmland County
Herman Lamm			independent Free-minded National Association; Liberal Party of Sweden	1910–1929	City of Stockholm
Maj-Lis Landberg			Social Democratic Party	1966–1970	Östergötland County
Lars Landgren			independent	1867–1868	Gävleborg County
Gunnar Lange			Social Democratic Party	1953–1970	Malmöhus County
Karl Langenskiöld			National Party	1916–1919	City of Stockholm
Johan Bernhard Lantto			Social Democratic Party	1912–1912	Värmland County
Tage Larfors			Social Democratic Party	1964–1970	Södermanland and Västmanland Counties
Gustaf Anton Larsén			Social Democratic Party	1919–1934	Halland County, Kronoberg and Halland Counties
Edward Larson			Free-minded National Association; Free-minded People's Party; People's Party	1914–1935	Skaraborg County
Salomon Larson			independent	1873–1876	Älvsborg County
Anders Larsson i Bränninge			independent Protectionist Party	1875–1878; 1882–1885; 1888–1895	Skaraborg County
Eric Larsson			Minority Party	1897–1903	Gävleborg County
Jacob Larsson			Free-minded National Association independent Social Democratic Party	1911–1914; 1917–1928	Norrbotten County, Stockholm County, Malmöhus County
Johan Larsson i Presstorp			Free-minded National Association	1912–1915	Gothenburg and Bohus County
Johan Larsson i Jonsjö			Farmers' League	1928–1934	Kronoberg and Halland Counties
Johan Larsson i Örbyhus			Free-minded People's Party; People's Party	1929–1938	Stockholm and Uppsala Counties
Knut Larsson			Protectionist Party; United Right Party; National Party	1909–1919	Värmland County
Lars Larsson i Bredsjö			Protectionist Party	1908–1909	Örebro County
Lars Larsson i Lotorp			Social Democratic Party	1957–1970	Östergötland County
Liss Olof Larsson			Protectionist Party	1891–1896	Kronoberg County
Nils Larsson			Social Democratic Party	1949–1953	Västernorrland and Jämtland Counties
Nils Larsson			Farmers' League	1952–1970	Kalmar and Gotland Counties
Oscar Larsson			Social Democratic Party	1919–1920	City of Stockholm
Sam Larsson			Free-minded People's Party; People's Party	1933–1945	Västernorrland and Jämtland Counties
Sigfrid Larsson			Farmers' League	1953–1960	Malmöhus County
Sven Larsson			Social Democratic Party	1935–1950	Kronoberg and Halland Counties
Thorsten Larsson			Centre Party	1959–1970	Malmöhus County
Viktor Larsson			Social Democratic Party	1933–1941	Östergötland County, Södermanland and Västmanland Counties
Edward Laurell			independent	1880–1883	Värmland County
Arvid Laurin			Farmers' National Organization	1919–1919	Gotland County
Gustaf de Laval			independent	1894–1902	Kopparberg County
Palne de Laval			independent	1867–1870	Kopparberg County
Axel Leander			Social Democratic Party	1937–1956	Malmöhus County
Ulrik Leander			Free-minded National Association; Free-minded People's Party	1922–1923; 1926–1931	Blekinge and Kristianstad Counties
Johan Leffler			independent	1886–1888	Gothenburg and Bohus County
Wilhelm Leijonancker			independent	1868–1876	Gothenburg and Bohus County
Abraham Leijonhufvud			independent	1885–1893	Kopparberg County
Sten Leijonhufvud			Protectionist Party	1889–1894	Södermanland County
Philip Leman			Minority Party independent	1896–1905	City of Gothenburg
John Lenning			independent	1873–1879	City of Norrköping
Henning Leo			Social Democratic Party	1931–1932	Stockholm and Uppsala Counties
Karl-Axel Levin			People's Party	1969–1970	Malmöhus County
Casimir Lewenhaupt			independent	1876–1893	Kopparberg County, Jämtland County
Claes Magnus Lewenhaupt			independent	1875–1882	Södermanland County
Erik Lewenhaupt			Protectionist Party; United Right Party	1892–1911	Västmanland County
Casper Lexow			independent	1876–1879	Värmland County
Bertil Lidgard			Rightist Party	1965–1970	City of Stockholm
Pehr Liedberg			Protectionist Party; United Right Party	1903–1910	Malmöhus County
Karl Liljesköld			independent	1884–1892	Värmland County
Erik Gustaf Lilliehöök			independent	1867–1872	Älvsborg County
August Lillienau			National Party	1918–1919	City of Gothenburg
Arvid Lilliesköld			Protectionist Party	1902–1908	Jönköping County
Olof Lind			Social Democratic Left Party	1919–1921	Kopparberg County
Wilhelm Lindahl			independent	1882–1892	Blekinge County
Ejnar Lindbärg			Social Democratic Party	1936–1943	Kopparberg County
Lars Lindberg			independent	1875–1875	Västmanland County
A.C. Lindblad			Social Democratic Party	1919–1919	City of Gothenburg
Anders Lindblad			Social Democratic Party	1912–1918	Södermanland County
Ernst Lindblad			Protectionist Party; United Right Party; National Party	1909–1919	Södermanland County
Hans Lindblad			People's Party	1969–1970	Gävleborg County
Erik Lindblom			People's Party	1939–1959	Kopparberg County
Lars Lindén			Social Democratic Party	1944–1956	Kalmar and Gotland Counties
William Linder			Social Democratic Party	1919–1947	Kristianstad County, Blekinge and Kristianstad Counties
Sven Linderot			Communist Party	1939–1949	Västerbotten and Norrbotten Counties
Sven Linders			Social Democratic Party	1927–1932	Malmöhus County
Adolf Lindgren			Rightist Party	1922–1924	Örebro County
Hjalmar Lindgren			Protectionist Party; United Right Party	1897–1911	Malmöhus County
Johan Magnus Lindgren			independent	1876–1880	Kalmar County Southern
August Lindh			Free-minded National Association	1912–1914	Värmland County
Albert Lindhagen			independent	1883–1887	City of Stockholm
Carl Lindhagen			Social Democratic Left Party independent Social Democratic Party	1919–1940	Västernorrland County, Västernorrland and Jämtland Counties
Charles Lindley			Social Democratic Party	1912–1937	City of Stockholm
Arvid Lindman			Protectionist Party; United Right Party	1905–1911	Gävleborg County, Älvsborg County
Carl Lindmark			National Party; Rightist Party	1931–1938	Västerbotten and Norrbotten Counties
Fritz Lindqvist			Social Democratic Party	1922–1924	Västernorrland and Jämtland Counties
Fritiof Lindskog			Social Democratic Party	1919–1921	Malmöhus County
Nils Lindstrand			Social Democratic Party	1922–1924	Östergötland County
Erik Lindström			National Party	1918–1919	Gävleborg County
Julius Lindström			independent	1879–1881	Örebro County
Rickard Lindström			Social Democratic Party	1931–1934	Stockholm and Uppsala Counties
Ulla Lindström			Social Democratic Party	1946–1970	City of Stockholm
Axel Linnér			Farmers' League	1914–1919	Kronoberg County
Sigfrid Linnér			Rightist Party	1939–1946	Stockholm and Uppsala Counties
Pehr Lithander			independent Protectionist Party	1886–1894; 1897–1908	Älvsborg County
Sven Littorin			independent	1878–1879	Skaraborg County
Blenda Ljungberg			Rightist Party	1962–1964	City of Stockholm
Eduard Ljungberg			Protectionist Party	1895–1903	Älvsborg County
Louis Ljungberg			independent Moderate Party of the Upper House	1907–1911	Kristianstad County
Vilmar Ljungdahl			Farmers' League	1943–1948	Kronoberg and Halland Counties
August Ljunggren			Free-minded National Association	1912–1926	Kronoberg County, Kronoberg and Halland Counties
Elof Ljunggren			Free-minded National Association	1912–1918	Örebro County
Nils Peter Ljunggren			independent	1881–1881	Kalmar County Southern
Leon Ljunglund			National Party	1926–1929	City of Stockholm
Ottonin Ljungqvist			independent Minority Party	1876–1889	Jönköping County
Gunnar Lodenius			Farmers' League	1942–1958	Stockholm and Uppsala Counties
Axel Löfgren			Social Democratic Party	1942–1945	City of Stockholm
Eliel Löfgren	1872–1940	lawyer	Free-minded National Association; Liberal Party of Sweden; People's Party	1910–1911; 1922–1922; 1930–1937	City of Stockholm, Stockholm and Uppsala Counties
Axel Löfvander			Farmers' League	1929–1948	Malmöhus County
Wilhelm Lothigius			independent Protectionist Party	1878–1894	Blekinge County, Halland County
Olof Löthner			Rightist Party	1946–1949	Jönköping County
John Lovén			Ministerial Group; Moderate Party of the Upper House	1904–1906	City of Stockholm
Alice Lundbeck			Moderate Party	1969–1969	City of Stockholm
Grethe Lundberg			Social Democratic Party	1969–1970	Malmöhus County
Måns Lundberg			Social Democratic Party	1920–1921	City of Malmö
Otto Lundberg			Protectionist Party	1900–1904	Västmanland County
Roland Lundberg			Rightist Party	1965–1968	Malmöhus County
Margit Lundblad			Social Democratic Party	1966–1970	Malmöhus County
Christian Lundeberg			Protectionist Party independent	1886–1911	Gävleborg County
Ernst Lundell			Rightist Party	1922–1935	Skaraborg County
Per Lundgren			Rightist Party	1947–1954	Västerbotten and Norrbotten Counties
Johan Lundin			Protectionist Party	1880–1895	Stockholm County
Sigurd Lundin			Social Democratic Party	1963–1970	Gävleborg County
Ragnar Lundqvist			Rightist Party	1948–1954	Stockholm and Uppsala Counties
Per Lundsten			Protectionist Party	1903–1908	Malmöhus County
Birger Lundström			People's Party	1954–1969	City of Stockholm
Carl Lundström			independent	1890–1902	Värmland County
Salli Luterkort			Social Democratic Party	1925–1927	Västernorrland and Jämtland Counties
Carl Lybeck			Protectionist Party	1895–1903	Kalmar County Northern
Ernst Lyberg			Free-minded National Association; Liberal Party of Sweden	1921–1928	Kopparberg County
Melcher Lyckholm			United Right Party; National Party	1910–1919	Gothenburg and Bohus County

== M ==
Representative	Lifespan	Profession	Party	Years	Constituency
Tord Magnuson			Moderate Party of the Upper House	1907–1910	Gävleborg County
Gerhard Magnusson			Social Democratic Party	1913–1920	Värmland County, City of Stockholm
Karl Magnusson			Social Democratic Party	1936–1943	Kalmar and Gotland Counties
Nils Magnusson			Social Democratic Party	1958–1970	Gothenburg and Bohus County
Paul Magnusson			Social Democratic Party	1924–1929	City of Stockholm
Tage Magnusson			Rightist Party	1952–1953; 1954–1956	Älvsborg County
Johan Mallmin			independent Protectionist Party	1878–1880; 1888–1891	Västmanland County
Gustaf Malmberg			Social Democratic Party	1919–1923	Kalmar County Southern, Kalmar and Gotland Counties
Klas Malmborg			National Party	1912–1917	Kalmar County Southern
Carl Johan Malmsten			independent	1867–1870	Skaraborg County
Alfred Malmström			independent	1884–1886	Kalmar County Southern
Julius Mankell			independent	1883–1890	Kronoberg County
Axel Mannerskantz			Rightist Party	1936–1943; 1956–1959	Kalmar and Gotland Counties
Carl Axel Mannerskantz			independent	1873–1883	Kalmar County Southern
Otto Mannheimer			Free-minded National Association	1912–1919	City of Gothenburg
Alfred de Maré			independent Free-trade Party of the Lower House	1876–1891	Kalmar County Northern
Gustaf de Maré			independent	1869–1879	Kalmar County Northern
Richard Markgren			Moderate Party of the Upper House	1910–1911	Västerbotten County
Alvar Mårtensson			Social Democratic Party	1957–1970	Malmöhus County
Oscar Mattsson			Social Democratic Party	1942–1949	Gothenburg and Bohus County
Torsten Mattsson			Centre Party	1959–1970	Kronoberg and Halland Counties
Bernhard Meijer			independent	1867–1870; 1876–1877	Kristianstad County
Olof Melin			Minority Party; Moderate Party of the Upper House	1900–1907	City of Gothenburg
Karl Mellén			National Party; National Organization of the Right	1928–1936	Älvsborg County
Carl von Mentzer			Protectionist Party; United Right Party; National Party	1902–1919	Jönköping County
Charodotes Meurling			National Party	1913–1918	Kalmar County Northern
Edvard Meyer			independent	1867–1875	Blekinge County
Carl Moberg			Protectionist Party	1892–1894; 1896–1905	Värmland County
Axel Modig			Free-minded National Association	1919–1922	Södermanland County, Södermanland and Västmanland Counties
Bertil Mogård			Social Democratic Party	1948–1961	City of Stockholm
Adolf Molin			Social Democratic Party	1919–1919	Stockholm County
Adolf von Möller			Protectionist Party	1892–1909	Halland County
Gustav Möller			Social Democratic Party	1919–1954	Stockholm County, Stockholm and Uppsala Counties
Peter von Möller			independent	1867–1883	Halland County
Yngve Möller			Social Democratic Party	1954–1970	Gävleborg County
Edvard Montgomery			Minority Party; Moderate Party of the Upper House	1903–1908	Värmland County
William Montgomery			Free-minded National Association	1913–1916	Stockholm County
Robert Montgomery-Cederhielm			Upper House branch of the Lantmanna Party	1868–1888	Örebro County
Axel Mörner			independent	1869–1880	Södermanland County
Axel Mörner			Free-minded National Association	1912–1912	Örebro County
Carl Göran Mörner			Conservative Group	1867–1875	Kronoberg County
Julius Oscar Mörner			independent	1867–1884	Östergötland County
Eric Mossberger			Social Democratic Party	1951–1970	Kronoberg and Halland Counties
Carl von Mühlenfels			Rightist Party	1935–1935	Kalmar and Gotland Counties
Thomas Munck af Rosenschöld			independent	1867–1875	Kristianstad County
Gösta Munthe			independent	1867–1875	Kronoberg County
Alva Myrdal			Social Democratic Party	1962–1970	City of Stockholm
Gunnar Myrdal			Social Democratic Party	1936–1938; 1944–1947	Kopparberg County

== N ==
Representative	Lifespan	Profession	Party	Years	Constituency
Bernhard Näsgård			Farmers' League	1945–1957	Gävleborg County
Pelle Näslund			People's Party	1939–1954	Västerbotten and Norrbotten Counties
Emil Näsström			Social Democratic Party	1941–1968	Västernorrland and Jämtland Counties
Fredrik Neess			National Party	1916–1919	Malmöhus County
Sixten Neiglick			Free-minded National Association	1912–1919	Gothenburg and Bohus County
Ture Nerman			Socialist Party; Social Democratic Party	1931–1937; 1946–1953	City of Stockholm
Nils Nestrup			People's Party	1959–1962	Kronoberg and Halland Counties
Otto Niklasson		farmer	Farmers' League	1948–1957	Älvsborg County
Karl August Nilson			Free-minded National Association	1912–1922	Värmland County
Alexander Nilsson			Farmers' League	1924–1939	Blekinge and Kristianstad Counties
Alfred Nilsson			People's Party	1949–1956	Malmöhus County
Anna-Lisa Nilsson			Centre Party	1968–1968	Blekinge and Kristianstad Counties
Anton Nilsson			National Party	1918–1919; 1922–1928	Malmöhus County
August Nilsson			Social Democratic Party	1919–1936	Malmöhus County
Bernhard Nilsson			National Party; National Organization of the Right	1934–1945	Jönköping County
Bror Nilsson			Farmers' League	1938–1953	Älvsborg County
Ferdinand Nilsson			Centre Party	1959–1970	Stockholm and Uppsala Counties
Gustaf Nilsson			Social Democratic Party	1919–1926	Kristianstad County, Blekinge and Kristianstad Counties
Hjalmar Nilsson			Social Democratic Party	1945–1965	Västernorrland and Jämtland Counties
Hjalmar Nilsson			Rightist Party	1948–1952	Malmöhus County
Johan Nilsson i Skottlandshus			Moderate Party of the Upper House; National Party; National Organization of the Right	1909–1955	Kristianstad County, Blekinge and Kristianstad Counties
Johan Nilsson			Social Democratic Party	1919–1944	City of Malmö, Malmöhus County
Jonas Nilsson			independent	1896–1898	Kristianstad County
Maja Nilsson			Social Democratic Party	1959–1967	Kopparberg County
Nils Nilsson i Mora			Centre Party	1968–1970	Kopparberg County
Nils Peter Nilsson			independent	1885–1887	Kristianstad County
Ola Nilsson			Protectionist Party	1889–1906	Kristianstad County
Patrick Nilsson			Farmers' League	1953–1954	Kronoberg and Halland Counties
Per Nilsson i Kärra			independent	1875–1878	Kristianstad County
Petrus Nilsson, see Petrus Gränebo
Theodor Nilsson			Social Democratic Party	1934–1941	Gothenburg and Bohus County
Thorle Nilsson			Social Democratic Party	1969–1970	Jönköping County
Yngve Nilsson			Rightist Party	1956–1970	Blekinge and Kristianstad Counties
Ivar Nilzon			Farmers' League	1948–1956	Östergötland County
Ernst Nisser			independent	1894–1898	Kopparberg County
Martin Nisser			Protectionist Party	1892–1907	Kopparberg County
Samy Nisser			independent	1883–1887	Kopparberg County
William Nisser			independent	1867–1872	Kopparberg County
William Nisser			Rightist Party	1938–1943	Kopparberg County
Erik Norberg			Social Democratic Party	1969–1970	Västernorrland and Jämtland Counties
Josef Nord			People's Party	1952–1962	Skaraborg County
Carl Nordenfalk			Minority Party; Moderate Party of the Upper House	1898–1906	Halland County
Johan Nordenfalk the Younger			independent	1867–1875	Kalmar County Northern
Olof Nordenfeldt			independent	1867–1870; 1873–1877	Värmland County
Carl Nordenfelt			independent	1885–1892	Värmland County
Enar Nordenfelt			independent	1867–1868	Blekinge County
Leonard Nordenfelt			independent	1868–1885	Gothenburg and Bohus County
Harald Nordenson			Rightist Party	1938–1953	City of Stockholm
Jonas Nordenson			Rightist Party	1962–1963	City of Stockholm
Daniel Nordlander			independent	1884–1885	Västerbotten County
Johan Jacob Nordström			independent	1867–1874	Norrbotten County
Margareta Nordström			People's Party	1960–1963	City of Stockholm
Per Norin			Social Democratic Party	1919–1928	Gävleborg County
Nils Norling			Social Democratic Party	1919–1936	Gävleborg County
David Norman			Social Democratic Party	1929–1955	Södermanland and Västmanland Counties
Uno Norman			National Party	1916–1917	Västerbotten County
Torsten Nothin			Social Democratic Party	1922–1928	Södermanland and Västmanland Counties
Jöns Nyberg			National Party	1919–1919	Malmöhus County
Axel Nylander			Rightist Party	1930–1937	Älvsborg County
Sven Nyman			People's Party	1961–1970	Södermanland and Västmanland Counties
Yngve Nyquist			Social Democratic Party	1968–1970	Kopparberg County
Carl Nyström			Protectionist Party	1891–1899; 1901–1909	Gothenburg and Bohus County
Hjalmar Nyström			Social Democratic Party	1949–1963	Västerbotten and Norrbotten Counties
Johan Fredrik Nyström			Protectionist Party; United Right Party; National Party	1900–1911; 1916–1918	Uppsala County, City of Stockholm
Johan Erik Nyström			independent	1880–1889	Norrbotten County
Thomas Nyström			independent	1894–1902	Blekinge County

== O ==
Representative	Lifespan	Profession	Party	Years	Constituency
Axel Odelberg			Conservative Group independent	1867–1883	Stockholm County
Theodor Odelberg			Protectionist Party; United Right Party; National Party	1892–1918	Kalmar County Northern, Gävleborg County
Wilhelm Odelberg			Protectionist Party; United Right Party	1885–1910	Stockholm County
Thor Hartwig Odencrants			independent	1873–1875	Jönköping County
Jonas Otto Ödlund			Social Democratic Party	1917–1920	Gävleborg County
Petrus Ödström			Free-minded National Association	1912–1912	Kalmar County Northern
Charles von Oelreich			Minority Party; Moderate Party of the Upper House	1902–1910	Kronoberg County
Bertil Ohlin			People's Party	1938–1944	City of Stockholm
Sven Ohlon			People's Party	1948–1958	City of Gothenburg
Ebbe Ohlsson			Rightist Party	1951–1970	Kronoberg and Halland Counties
Lilly Ohlsson			Social Democratic Party	1966–1970	Malmöhus County
Ola Ohlsson			independent	1880–1883	Kristianstad County
Gunnar Öhman			Communist Party	1946–1953	City of Stockholm
Ivar Öhman			National Party; National Organization of the Right	1919–1919; 1929–1936	City of Malmö, Malmöhus County
Henric Öhngren			Free-minded National Association; Free-minded People's Party	1919–1924	Västernorrland County, Västernorrland and Jämtland Counties
David Ollén			People's Party	1954–1961	City of Stockholm
Johan Olofsson i Digernäs			Free-minded National Association	1919–1921	Jämtland County
Per Olofsson			Social Democratic Party	1942–1961	Västernorrland and Jämtland Counties
Uno Olofsson			People's Party	1955–1962	Västerbotten and Norrbotten Counties
Carl Olsén			Social Democratic Party	1952–1964	Västernorrland and Jämtland Counties
Gottfried Olsén			Protectionist Party; United Right Party	1890–1892; 1903–1911	Värmland County
Åhlmans Olof Olsson			Farmers' League	1919–1921	Kopparberg County
Anders Olsson			independent	1875–1876	Älvsborg County
Christoffer Olsson			independent	1874–1878	Malmöhus County
Elvy Olsson			Centre Party	1964–1970	Södermanland and Västmanland Counties
Erik Olsson			Social Democratic Party	1954–1970	Västernorrland and Jämtland Counties
Ernst Olsson			Centre Party	1959–1963; 1968–1970	Blekinge and Kristianstad Counties
Johan A. Olsson			Centre Party	1965–1970	Gävleborg County
K. J. Olsson			Social Democratic Party	1938–1953	Älvsborg County
Karl Olsson			Farmers' League	1922–1923	Blekinge and Kristianstad Counties
Lars Olsson i Vallsta			Free-minded National Association	1912–1918	Gävleborg County
Manne Olsson			Social Democratic Party	1962–1962; 1964–1970	Stockholm and Uppsala Counties
Martin Olsson			Social Democratic Party	1931–1931	Blekinge and Kristianstad Counties
Nils Olsson			Social Democratic Party	1941–1948	Västernorrland and Jämtland Counties
Olof Olsson			Social Democratic Party	1912–1939	Malmöhus County
Oscar Olsson			Social Democratic Party	1925–1948	Östergötland County
Peter Magnus Olsson			National Party	1914–1920	Kronoberg County
Petter Olsson			Upper House branch of the Lantmanna Party; Protectionist Party	1879–1887; 1889–1897	Malmöhus County
Valerius Olsson			National Party	1912–1917	Kalmar County Southern
William Olsson			Social Democratic Party	1945–1947; 1952–1955	Blekinge and Kristianstad Counties
Ivar Öman			Rightist Party	1938–1940	City of Stockholm
Axel Örbom			Protectionist Party	1889–1889	City of Stockholm
Anders Örne			Social Democratic Party	1927–1934	Örebro County
John Örwall			independent	1888–1890	Östergötland County
Fredrik Östberg			United Right Party; National Party	1911–1916	Stockholm County
Gustaf Fredrik Östberg			Protectionist Party; United Right Party	1897–1910	Stockholm County
Johan Östberg			Moderate Party of the Upper House	1909–1910	Gävleborg County
Johan Östberg			National Party	1912–1921	City of Stockholm
Gustaf Österberg			Free-minded National Association	1914–1918	Södermanland County
Sven-Otto Österdahl			People's Party	1968–1970	Kalmar and Gotland Counties
August Östergren			Protectionist Party	1890–1898	Gotland County
Theodor Östergren			Social Democratic Party	1924–1933	Blekinge and Kristianstad Counties
Ivar Österström			Free-minded People's Party	1925–1932	Västernorrland and Jämtland Counties
John Östling			Free-minded National Association	1914–1917	Jämtland County
Hugo Osvald			People's Party	1948–1963	Södermanland and Västmanland Counties
Ingrid Osvald			People's Party	1947–1950	Stockholm and Uppsala Counties
Carl von Otter			independent	1867–1872	Jönköping County
Fredrik von Otter			independent	1892–1899; 1903–1905	Blekinge County
Holge Ottosson			Rightist Party	1964–1970	Jönköping County

== P ==
Representative	Lifespan	Profession	Party	Years	Constituency
Sture Palm			Social Democratic Party	1959–1970	Stockholm and Uppsala Counties
Olof Palme	1927–1986	minister	Social Democratic Party	1958–1968	Jönköping County
Henrik Palmstierna			independent	1867–1868; 1881–1885	Södermanland County
Hjalmar Palmstierna			Protectionist Party	1900–1909	Jönköping County
Jöns Pålsson			Free-minded National Association; Liberal Party of Sweden; People's Party	1918–1936	Malmöhus County
Olof Pålsson			Farmers' League	1949–1960	Västernorrland and Jämtland Counties
Ivan Pauli			Social Democratic Party	1922–1949	Jönköping County
Paul Paulson			Protectionist Party; United Right Party; National Party	1894–1896; 1900–1918	Malmöhus County
John Pehrsson			independent Protectionist Party	1887–1900	Kristianstad County
Jöns Pehrsson			Upper House branch of the Lantmanna Party	1878–1882	Kronoberg County
Ola Pehrsson			independent	1876–1885	Kristianstad County
Pehr Pehrsson			United Right Party	1911–1911	Blekinge County
Anders Pers			Free-minded National Association; Liberal Party of Sweden; People's Party	1911–1935	Kopparberg County
Einar Persson			Social Democratic Party	1944–1967	Kopparberg County
Fritz Persson			Social Democratic Party	1961–1970	Kronoberg and Halland Counties
Helmer Persson			Communist Party	1949–1962	Västerbotten and Norrbotten Counties
Ivar Persson			Farmers' League	1939–1958	Malmöhus County
Johan Persson i Östervåla			People's Party	1953–1960	Södermanland and Västmanland Counties
Karl Persson			Farmers' League	1946–1955	Blekinge and Kristianstad Counties
Nils Persson			Protectionist Party	1898–1902	Malmöhus County
Nils Persson			Social Democratic Party	1917–1919; 1922–1926	City of Malmö, Malmöhus County
Nils Persson			People's Party	1969–1969	Malmöhus County
Ragnar Persson			Social Democratic Party	1951–1966	Kronoberg and Halland Counties
Yngve Persson			Social Democratic Party	1952–1952	Malmöhus County
Yngve Persson			Social Democratic Party	1964–1970	City of Stockholm
Gösta af Petersens			United Right Party	1910–1911	Kronoberg County
Eric Peterson			People's Party	1961–1970	Östergötland County
Gustaf Peterson			independent	1876–1884	Blekinge County
Alfred Petersson			Free-minded National Association	1911–1920	Gävleborg County, Jönköping County, Stockholm County
Bertil Petersson			Social Democratic Party	1957–1970	Kalmar and Gotland Counties
Emil Petersson			People's Party	1940–1951	Blekinge and Kristianstad Counties
Erik Petersson			People's Party	1963–1968	Kronoberg and Halland Counties
Hans Petersson			People's Party	1970–1970	Malmöhus County
Johannes Petersson			independent	1875–1881	Älvsborg County
Knut Petersson			People's Party	1935–1945	City of Gothenburg
Lorents Petersson			Protectionist Party; United Right Party	1903–1911	Kopparberg County
Per Petersson			Rightist Party	1963–1964	Västerbotten and Norrbotten Counties
Peter Petersson			independent	1905–1906	Västmanland County
Casimir Petre			independent	1867–1877	Gävleborg County
Alfred Petrén			Social Democratic Party	1912–1935	Kopparberg County
Bror Petrén			Free-minded National Association; Liberal Party of Sweden	1912–1914; 1918–1925	Kristianstad County, Malmöhus County, Blekinge and Kristianstad Counties
Folke Petrén			People's Party	1948–1952	Södermanland and Västmanland Counties
Axel Petri			Protectionist Party	1903–1906	Jönköping County
Malkolm Petterson			Free-minded National Association	1916–1921	Jönköping County
Anton Pettersson			Farmers' League	1922–1923; 1932–1939	Södermanland and Västmanland Counties, Blekinge and Kristianstad Counties
Arne Pettersson			Social Democratic Party	1965–1970	Malmöhus County
August Pettersson			Protectionist Party; United Right Party	1907–1910	Stockholm County
Carl Pettersson			Protectionist Party	1892–1901	Kopparberg County
Carl Johan Pettersson			independent	1880–1882	Östergötland County
David Pettersson			National Party; National Organization of the Right	1933–1940	Östergötland County
Fredrik Pettersson			Protectionist Party	1892–1907; 1909–1909	Gothenburg and Bohus County, Jönköping County
Georg Pettersson			Social Democratic Party	1949–1970	Kalmar and Gotland Counties
Gunnar Pettersson			People's Party	1965–1966	Örebro County
Johannes Pettersson			Social Democratic Party	1940–1943	Värmland County
Karl Pettersson			Moderate Party	1969–1970	Västernorrland and Jämtland Counties
Olaus Pettersson			Free-minded National Association; Free-minded People's Party	1912–1930	Älvsborg County
Per Pettersson			independent	1884–1888	Kopparberg County
Adolph Peyron			independent	1870–1888	City of Stockholm
Gustaf Oscar Peyron			independent	1867–1873	Malmöhus County
John Philipson			Protectionist Party	1891–1899	City of Norrköping
Alfred Piper			Scanian Party; Minority Party	1883–1899	Malmöhus County
Charles Piper			Conservative Group independent	1867–1869; 1883–1883	Östergötland County
Fritz Piper			independent Scanian Party	1867–1875	Malmöhus County
Baltzar von Platen (politician, born 1804)			independent	1867–1873	Uppsala County
Carl von Platen			independent	1874–1882	Malmöhus County
Philip von Platen			independent	1879–1886	Kristianstad County
Emil Poignant			Protectionist Party	1894–1895	Gotland County
Arvid Posse			independent	1882–1890	Kalmar County Southern
Gösta Posse			independent Upper House branch of the Lantmanna Party	1869–1884	Skaraborg County, Kristianstad County
Knut Posse			Protectionist Party	1894–1906	Kronoberg County
Knut Knutsson Posse			independent	1876–1877; 1879–1883	Kronoberg County
Nils Posse			United Right Party; National Party	1910–1918	Skaraborg County
Ludvig von Post			independent	1892–1892	Västmanland County
Victor von Post			independent Protectionist Party	1880–1898	Östergötland County

== R ==
Representative	Lifespan	Profession	Party	Years	Constituency
Adam Christian Raab			independent	1867–1872	Kalmar County Southern
Carl Raab			independent	1867–1873	Kalmar County Northern
Bengt Rääf			independent	1880–1886	Östergötland County
Pehr Rabe			Moderate Party of the Upper House	1905–1906	City of Stockholm
Albert Ramberg			Social Democratic Party	1943–1955	Värmland County
Hans Ramel			National Party	1918–1918	Malmöhus County
Otto Ramel			independent	1874–1889	Malmöhus County
Dagmar Ranmark			Social Democratic Party	1953–1970	Värmland County
Adolf Rappe			independent	1878–1886	Blekinge County
August Rappe			Protectionist Party	1892–1893; 1897–1901	Kronoberg County
Christopher Rappe			Protectionist Party	1902–1906	Kalmar County Southern
Wilhelm von Rehausen			independent	1878–1878	Gävleborg County
Anton Rettig			independent	1867–1870	Gävleborg County
John Rettig			Minority Party; Moderate Party of the Upper House	1894–1907	City of Gävle
Robert Rettig			independent	1871–1879	Gävleborg County
Adam Reuterskiöld			independent	1876–1880	Östergötland County
Carl Reuterskiöld			independent	1873–1881	Uppsala County
Carl Axel Reuterskiöld			independent Farmers' League	1919–1938	Uppsala County, Stockholm and Uppsala Counties
Patric Reuterswärd			independent Protectionist Party	1867–1899	Kopparberg County, Västmanland County
Carl Rhodin			independent	1875–1882	Värmland County
Carl Ribbing			independent	1871–1879	Jönköping County
Sigurd Ribbing			independent	1875–1879	Norrbotten County
Gunnar Richardson			People's Party	1969–1970	Skaraborg County
Gustaf Richert			Moderate Party of the Upper House	1907–1909	City of Stockholm
Fredrick Richter			independent	1883–1891	Kronoberg County
Fredrik Ridderbielke			Protectionist Party; United Right Party	1898–1905; 1908–1911	Uppsala County
Per-Eric Ringaby			Rightist Party	1958–1963	Gothenburg and Bohus County
Bo Risberg			Rightist Party	1964–1965	Gothenburg and Bohus County
Albert Robson			independent	1879–1884	Örebro County
Edvard Herman Rodhe			independent	1895–1902	Gothenburg and Bohus County
Herman Rogberg			Moderate Party of the Upper House; National Party	1908–1909	Västerbotten County, Västerbotten and Norrbotten Counties
Harald Röhss			independent	1894–1899	Skaraborg County
Gottfrid Roman			Free-minded National Association	1912–1917	Jämtland County
Julius Roman			Minority Party	1889–1896	Jämtland County
Carl Romanus			Social Democratic Party	1919–1921	City of Stockholm
Gunnar Rönnberg			Social Democratic Party	1963–1970	Västerbotten and Norrbotten Counties
Adolf Roos			United Right Party	1911–1919	Kronoberg County
Adolf Wilhelm Roos			independent	1875–1889	Norrbotten County
Axel Roos			People's Party	1937–1944	Malmöhus County
Gustaf Roos			National Party; National Organization of the Right	1928–1935	Kalmar and Gotland Counties
Axel Rooth			National Party	1913–1928	Kronoberg County, Kronoberg and Halland Counties
Axel Ros			independent	1883–1891	Värmland County
Gustaf Ros			independent Protectionist Party; United Right Party	1902–1910	Kopparberg County
Gustaf Rosander			Social Democratic Party	1945–1950	Kronoberg and Halland Counties
Fredrik von Rosen			independent Moderate Party of the Upper House	1903–1911	Södermanland County
Gustaf von Rosen			Moderate Party of the Upper House	1910–1911	City of Stockholm
Gustav Rosén			Free-minded National Association; Free-minded People's Party	1912–1932	Västerbotten County, Västerbotten and Norrbotten Counties
Ragnar Rosenberg			Social Democratic Party	1943–1952	Blekinge and Kristianstad Counties
Henrik Rosensvärd			independent	1871–1884	Värmland County
Karl Rosling			Social Democratic Party	1919–1920	Jönköping County
Anna Rosvall			Rightist Party	1964–1964	Malmöhus County
Gustaf Rudebeck			Protectionist Party	1892–1902	Värmland County
Abraham Rundbäck			Protectionist Party	1888–1890	Gothenburg and Bohus County
Axel Rune			Free-minded National Association; Free-minded People's Party	1913–1919; 1922–1927	Kalmar County Northern, Kalmar and Gotland Counties
Bernhard Rutqvist			independent	1919–1920	Norrbotten County
Carl Rydberg			Protectionist Party	1902–1906	Östergötland County
Wilhelm Rydberg			National Party; National Organization of the Right	1931–1937	Stockholm and Uppsala Counties
Gustaf Rydén			independent	1874–1874	Jönköping County
Värner Rydén			Social Democratic Party	1919–1920; 1929–1930	City of Malmö, Malmöhus County
Herman Rydin			independent	1867–1875	Västerbotten County
Gustaf Ryding			Minority Party	1892–1893	Västernorrland County
Carl Rydqvist			independent	1870–1878	Älvsborg County
Johan Rylander			Protectionist Party	1901–1907	Älvsborg County
Olof Rylander			independent	1877–1883	Älvsborg County

== S ==
Representative	Lifespan	Profession	Party	Years	Constituency
Christoffer Sahlin			independent	1867–1867; 1870–1874	Älvsborg County
Johan Gustaf Samuelson			Protectionist Party; United Right Party	1909–1911	Skaraborg County
Oskar Samuelson			Socialist Party	1930–1930	City of Stockholm
Per Samzelius			independent Protectionist Party	1876–1884; 1887–1895	Kristianstad County, Kalmar County Southern
Johan Sandberg			independent Protectionist Party	1884–1901	Kalmar County Southern
John Sandberg			Social Democratic Party	1942–1954	Jönköping County
Nils Sandberg			independent	1878–1879	Älvsborg County
Karl Sandegård		vicar	Social Democratic Party	1930–1937	Älvsborg County
John Sandén			Social Democratic Party	1926–1947	Värmland County
Johan Sandler			Free-minded National Association	1913–1918	Västernorrland County
Rickard Sandler			Social Democratic Party	1919–1964	City of Gävle, Gävleborg County
Svante Sandqvist			Protectionist Party	1898–1906	Gävleborg County
Gustaf Sandström			Rightist Party	1940–1945	City of Stockholm
Pontus Sandström			National Party; National Organization of the Right	1931–1938	Västerbotten and Norrbotten Counties
Alfred Sandwall			Protectionist Party; United Right Party	1904–1911	Älvsborg County
Gunnar Sanne			Rightist Party	1935–1937	Gothenburg and Bohus County
Johan Sanne			Protectionist Party	1888–1902	Gothenburg and Bohus County
Bernhard Santesson			independent	1871–1872	Halland County
Adolf Säve			independent	1868–1868	Skaraborg County
Teofron Säve			Protectionist Party; United Right Party	1892–1910	Värmland County
Frans Schartau			Conservative Group	1867–1869	City of Stockholm
Carl Schedin			Farmers' League	1922–1927; 1929–1929	Kopparberg County, Gävleborg County
Karl Schlyter			Social Democratic Party	1919–1920; 1926–1949	Blekinge County, Värmland County
Carl Schmidt			People's Party	1958–1964	City of Gothenburg
Henrik Schönbeck			Upper House branch of the Lantmanna Party; Minority Party	1876–1888	Malmöhus County
Lars Schött			Rightist Party	1960–1970	Kalmar and Gotland Counties
Axel Schotte			Free-minded National Association	1919–1921	Västerbotten County
Gustaf Victor Schotte			independent Protectionist Party	1886–1888	Södermanland County
Hildebrand Schröder			independent	1894–1899	Örebro County
Carl Werner von Schultzenheim			independent	1889–1891	Örebro County
Jules von Schwerin			independent Scanian Party	1867–1875	Malmöhus County
Werner von Schwerin			independent Moderate Party of the Upper House	1903–1911	Malmöhus County
Alexander Emanuel Schyller			National Party	1918–1919	Kalmar County Southern
Edward Sederholm			independent Protectionist Party	1883–1902	Södermanland County
Gustaf Sederholm			National Party; National Organization of the Right	1919–1939	Södermanland County, Södermanland and Västmanland Counties
Ingrid Segerstedt Wiberg			People's Party	1959–1970	City of Gothenburg
Carl Sehlin			Free-minded National Association	1912–1913	Jämtland County
Jonas Selggren			independent	1867–1867	Gävleborg County
Bo Siegbahn			Social Democratic Party	1957–1961	City of Stockholm
Nils Sigfrid			Free-minded National Association	1920–1920	Kristianstad County
August Silfverschiöld			Minority Party	1867–1869	Älvsborg County
Carl Otto Silfverschiöld			independent	1869–1872	Halland County
Otto Silfverschiöld			Protectionist Party; United Right Party	1909–1919	Älvsborg County
Gösta Siljeström			Rightist Party	1942–1945	City of Stockholm
Anton Sjö			Social Democratic Party	1946–1950	Malmöhus County
Per Henning Sjöblom			Social Democratic Party	1926–1929	Stockholm and Uppsala Counties
Pehr Sjöbring			independent	1876–1879	Östergötland County
Cornelius Sjöcrona			independent Protectionist Party	1887–1893; 1901–1909	Skaraborg County
Axel Sjögreen			independent	1890–1892	Jönköping County
Albert Sjöholm			Protectionist Party; United Right Party	1899–1911	Södermanland County
Åke Sjölin			Minority Party	1892–1895	Malmöhus County
Bengt Sjönell			People's Party	1961–1961	City of Stockholm
Anna Sjöström-Bengtsson			Social Democratic Party	1943–1958	City of Gothenburg
Gunnar Skagerlund			People's Party	1966–1966; 1969–1970	Örebro County
Bo Skårman			People's Party	1964–1970	Älvsborg County
Waldemar Skarstedt			Free-minded National Association	1912–1914	Kopparberg County
Carl Skogman			independent	1869–1877	Blekinge County
Karl Ivar Sköldén			Farmers' League	1934–1941	Gothenburg and Bohus County
Göran Skytte			Moderate Party of the Upper House	1908–1911	Jämtland County
Herman Smedh			Social Democratic Party	1936–1936	Kopparberg County
Lars Smith			independent	1886–1891	Blekinge County
Axel von Sneidern			Free-minded National Association; Liberal Party of Sweden	1921–1927	Älvsborg County
Gustaf Snoilsky			independent	1892–1894	Gothenburg and Bohus County
Gustaf Snygg			Social Democratic Party	1950–1960	Kopparberg County
Ernst Söderberg			Social Democratic Party	1917–1919	Stockholm County
Magnus Söderberg			independent Protectionist Party	1883–1907	Jönköping County
Sten Söderberg			Social Democratic Party	1956–1967	Södermanland and Västmanland Counties
Frithiof Söderbergh			Free-minded National Association	1911–1916	Blekinge County
Karl Söderdahl			Social Democratic Party	1943–1948	Kalmar and Gotland Counties
Wilhelm Söderhjelm			independent	1880–1897	Gävleborg County
Verner Söderkvist			Social Democratic Party	1938–1948	Västernorrland and Jämtland Counties
Martin Söderquist			People's Party	1950–1962	Stockholm and Uppsala Counties
Joel Sörenson			People's Party	1964–1970	City of Stockholm
Per Sörensson			Protectionist Party; United Right Party	1896–1911	Malmöhus County
Thore Sörlin			Social Democratic Party	1955–1970	Västerbotten and Norrbotten Counties
Emil Spånberg			Moderate Party of the Upper House	1909–1911	Jönköping County
Wilhelm Spånberg			independent Minority Party	1884–1892	Jönköping County
Erik Sparre			Conservative Group	1867–1869	Älvsborg County
Gustaf Adolf Vive Sparre			independent	1867–1875	Kopparberg County
Gustaf Sparre			independent Scanian Party; Centre of the Upper House; Minority Party	1871–1888	Skaraborg County
Knut Sparre			independent	1900–1902	Jämtland County
Harald Spens			independent Protectionist Party	1876–1879; 1891–1907	Östergötland County, Kronoberg County
Jacob Spens			United Right Party; National Party	1910–1933	Jönköping County
Gunnar Spetz			People's Party	1950–1961	Gothenburg and Bohus County
Jacob Wilhelm Sprengtporten			Conservative Group independent	1867–1874	Södermanland County
Sam Stadener			Free-minded National Association	1912–1917	Malmöhus County
Otto Stadling			Social Democratic Party	1965–1970	Västernorrland and Jämtland Counties
Fabian Staël von Holstein			independent	1867–1869	Kristianstad County
Nils Ståhle			Social Democratic Party	1956–1970	Södermanland and Västmanland Counties
August Stålberg			National Party	1916–1919	Södermanland County
Jon Stålhammar			independent	1867–1870	Jönköping County
Isidor von Stapelmohr			Minority Party; Moderate Party of the Upper House; National Party	1892–1899; 1903–1915	Jämtland County
Alfred Stärner			Free-minded National Association	1912–1918	Västernorrland County
Stig Stefanson			People's Party	1960–1970	Kopparberg County
Gustaf Steffen			Social Democratic Party independent	1911–1916	Stockholm County
Uno Steinholtz			National Party	1919–1920	Kalmar County Northern
Hemming Sten			Social Democratic Party	1937–1954	Gävleborg County
Gunvor Stenberg			Rightist Party	1963–1970	Västerbotten and Norrbotten Counties
Johan Algot Stenberg			National Party	1918–1919; 1927–1930	Västerbotten County, Västerbotten and Norrbotten Counties
Lars Stendahl			United Right Party; National Party	1910–1912	Halland County
Sten Stendahl			National Party; National Organization of the Right	1919–1937	City of Stockholm
Widar Stener			Rightist Party	1949–1950	Kronoberg and Halland Counties
Karl Stenström			Free-minded National Association	1918–1919	Kalmar County Southern
Josef Stephens			independent Protectionist Party	1887–1909	Kronoberg County
Harald Sternhagen			independent	1905–1905	City of Gothenburg
Henrik Stiernspetz			independent	1880–1887	Jönköping County
Jules Stjernblad			Minority Party; Scanian Party	1867–1877	Malmöhus County
Bo von Stockenström			Free-minded National Association independent Free-minded People's Party; People's Party	1923–1942	Södermanland and Västmanland Counties
Carl von Stockenström			independent	1870–1878; 1880–1887	Västmanland County, Gothenburg and Bohus County
Carl Storckenfeldt			independent	1867–1872; 1874–1886	Skaraborg County
Holdo Stråle			independent	1879–1887	Västmanland County
Wilhelm Stråle			independent	1870–1896	Stockholm County
Axel Strand			Social Democratic Party	1938–1970	City of Stockholm
Bertil Strandberg			Rightist Party	1965–1970	Västerbotten and Norrbotten Counties
Nils Strandler			Social Democratic Party	1953–1960	Östergötland County
Gunnar Sträng			Social Democratic Party	1946–1953	Älvsborg County
Ernst Stridsberg			Protectionist Party	1888–1897	Älvsborg County
Fredrik von Strokirch			independent Protectionist Party	1873–1881; 1888–1902	Jönköping County
Fredrik Ström			Social Democratic Party; Social Democratic Left Party	1916–1919; 1921; 1930–1948	City of Stockholm, Norrbotten County
Torsten Ström			Social Democratic Party	1922–1943	Skaraborg County
Gustaf Strömberg			Social Democratic Party	1919–1940	Värmland County
Otto Strömberg			Protectionist Party; United Right Party; National Party	1905–1922	Uppsala County
Fredrik Knut Harald Strömfelt			Protectionist Party	1888–1890	City of Norrköping
Oskar Strutz			Free-minded National Association	1921–1923	Södermanland County, Södermanland and Västmanland Counties
Anton Niklas Sundberg			independent	1877–1892	Gothenburg and Bohus County
Axel Sundberg			National Party	1926–1934	Gothenburg and Bohus County
Carl Sundberg			Rightist Party	1938–1951	Kalmar and Gotland Counties
Hugo Sundberg			Social Democratic Party	1947–1956	Västerbotten and Norrbotten Counties
August Sundblad			United Right Party	1910–1911	Gotland County
Gustaf Sundelin			People's Party	1943–1964	Örebro County
Erik Mauritz Sundell			independent	1873–1875; 1878–1881	Kopparberg County
Roland Sundgren			Social Democratic Party	1970–1970	Södermanland and Västmanland Counties
Nils Sundin			independent	1875–1878	Örebro County
Sven Sundin			Farmers' League	1957–1970	Västernorrland and Jämtland Counties
Oscar Sundström			independent	1885–1889	Värmland County
Anders Sundvik			Social Democratic Party	1937–1955	Kopparberg County
Johan Sunne			People's Party	1949–1960	Östergötland County
Conrad Svanberg			independent	1875–1883	Älvsborg County
Eli Svänsson			Social Democratic Party	1924–1927	Kalmar and Gotland Counties
Ivan Svanström			Centre Party	1960–1970	Kalmar and Gotland Counties
Gunnar Svärd			Rightist Party	1958–1963	Jönköping County
Erik Svedberg			Social Democratic Party	1953–1970	Gävleborg County
Lage Svedberg			Social Democratic Party	1939–1970	Västerbotten and Norrbotten Counties
Theodor Svedberg			independent	1875–1877	Kopparberg County
Axel Svedelius			independent Protectionist Party	1889–1907	Värmland County, Örebro County
Anton Svensson			Farmers' League	1938–1941	Jönköping County
Axel Svensson			Social Democratic Party	1953–1965	Malmöhus County
Carl Svensson			Social Democratic Party	1918–1935	City of Gothenburg, Södermanland County, Södermanland and Västmanland Counties
Erik Svensson i Västerås			Social Democratic Party	1968–1970	Södermanland and Västmanland Counties
Ernst Svensson i Eskhult, see Ernst Eskhult
Gärda Svensson			Farmers' League	1945–1963	Kronoberg and Halland Counties
Gustaf Svensson i Tomelilla			Free-minded National Association	1914–1914	Kristianstad County
Isak Svensson			Free-minded National Association	1919–1930	Gothenburg and Bohus County
Martin Svensson i Kompersmåla			National Party; National Organization of the Right	1922–1942	Kronoberg and Halland Counties
Nils Svensson			Social Democratic Party	1939–1939	Västerbotten and Norrbotten Counties
Rikard Svensson			Social Democratic Party	1954–1970	Blekinge and Kristianstad Counties
Arne Svenungsson			Rightist Party	1966–1970	Gothenburg and Bohus County
Nils Swartling			Rightist Party	1935–1939	Blekinge and Kristianstad Counties
Carl Swartz			Minority Party; Moderate Party of the Upper House; National Party	1900–1926	City of Norrköping, Östergötland County
Carl Fredric von Sydow			independent	1889–1891	Halland County
Fredrik von Sydow			independent	1871–1874	Kristianstad County
Hjalmar von Sydow			National Party	1916–1919; 1922–1932	City of Stockholm
Hakon Sylvan			Farmers' League	1937–1938	Malmöhus County
Eilif Sylwan			Rightist Party	1937–1944	Malmöhus County

== T ==
Representative	Lifespan	Profession	Party	Years	Constituency
August Tamm			Minority Party	1900–1905	Södermanland County
Gösta Tamm			Free-minded National Association	1912–1914	Södermanland County
Gustaf Tamm	1838–1925		independent Minority Party; Moderate Party of the Upper House	1883–1889; 1902–1909	Gävleborg County, City of Stockholm
Gustaf Tamm			Protectionist Party	1894–1897; 1899–1908	Uppsala County
Gustaf Tamm			National Party; National Organization of the Right	1929–1942	Södermanland and Västmanland Counties
Hugo Tamm			independent Minority Party; Minority Party; Moderate Party of the Upper House	1885–1907	Uppsala County, Jämtland County
Carl Taube			Minority Party; Protectionist Party; United Right Party	1899–1911	Norrbotten County
Axel Tengvall			National Party	1917–1919	Blekinge County
Wilhelm Tersmeden			Conservative Group independent	1867–1874	Västmanland County
Erik Testrup			National Party	1929–1929	City of Stockholm
Henric Sebastian Tham			independent	1879–1879	Västmanland County
Sebastian Tham			Protectionist Party	1895–1897; 1899–1907	Halland County
Vollrath Tham			independent	1900–1905	Örebro County
Volrath Tham			National Party; National Organization of the Right	1919–1919; 1934–1936	Gävleborg County
Wilhelm Tham			independent	1887–1891	Jönköping County
Arvid Thelin			National Party; National Organization of the Right	1928–1935	Kronoberg and Halland Counties
Robert Themptander			independent	1884–1888	Kristianstad County
Arvid Thorberg			Social Democratic Party	1922–1930	City of Stockholm
William Thorburn			independent	1867–1869	Gothenburg and Bohus County
Carl Thorén			Free-minded People's Party	1927–1934	Kronoberg and Halland Counties
Viktor Thörnberg			Social Democratic Party	1940–1942	Blekinge and Kristianstad Counties
Gustaf Thornérhjelm			independent	1890–1902	Malmöhus County
Einar Thulin			Social Democratic Party	1919–1932; 1940–1941	Östergötland County
Edvin Thun			Social Democratic Party	1951–1962	Stockholm and Uppsala Counties
Fritjof Thun			Social Democratic Party	1947–1954	Stockholm and Uppsala Counties
Johan Thyrén			independent	1912–1917	Uppsala County
Carl Johan Thyselius			independent	1869–1886	Kronoberg County
Knut Tillberg			Protectionist Party	1897–1908	Kalmar County Northern
Eskil Tistad			People's Party	1966–1970	Gothenburg and Bohus County
Leonard Tjällgren			Farmers' League	1922–1956	Västernorrland and Jämtland Counties
Olof Tonning			Protectionist Party; United Right Party	1908–1911	Malmöhus County
Gustaf Torelius			Protectionist Party	1892–1900	Älvsborg County
Ragnar Törnebladh			independent Minority Party; Ministerial Group; Moderate Party of the Upper House	1880–1888; 1890–1909	Kalmar County Northern, City of Stockholm
Axel Törner			Protectionist Party	1900–1904	Kronoberg County
Rudolf Tornérhjelm			independent	1867–1884	Malmöhus County
Axel Träff			Social Democratic Party	1919–1921	Östergötland County
Henning Trägårdh			independent	1892–1895	Örebro County
Carl af Trampe			independent	1879–1879	Gothenburg and Bohus County
Erik Trana			United Right Party; National Party	1910–1916	City of Gothenburg
Oscar Trapp			Moderate Party of the Upper House; National Party	1908–1916	Malmöhus County
Curry Treffenberg			Protectionist Party	1889–1897	Kopparberg County
Troed Troedsson			Moderate Party of the Upper House	1908–1911	Kristianstad County
Carl Oscar Troilius			independent	1867–1875	Örebro County
Carl Axel Trolle			Conservative Group independent	1867–1873	Malmöhus County
Nils Trolle			Protectionist Party; United Right Party; National Party	1895–1913	Malmöhus County
Carl Trolle-Bonde			Upper House branch of the Lantmanna Party independent	1885–1891; 1897–1902	Kristianstad County, Malmöhus County
Axel Knut Trolle-Wachtmeister			independent	1867–1871	Kristianstad County
Ernst Trygger			Protectionist Party; United Right Party independent National Party; National Organization of the Right	1898–1937	Kopparberg County, City of Stockholm

== U ==
Representative	Lifespan	Profession	Party	Years	Constituency
Carl Gustaf Uggla			independent	1867–1871	Värmland County
Gustaf af Ugglas			Minority Party independent Ministerial Group	1867–1893	Östergötland County, City of Stockholm
Ludvig af Ugglas			Minority Party independent	1867–1880	Stockholm County
Axel Uhlén			Social Democratic Party	1945–1952	Malmöhus County
Gustaf Ulfsparre			independent	1876–1882	Kalmar County Southern
Östen Undén			Social Democratic Party	1934–1965	Värmland County
Adolf Unger			independent	1887–1890	Älvsborg County
Magnus Unger			Protectionist Party	1886–1892; 1894–1907	Örebro County

== V ==
Representative	Lifespan	Profession	Party	Years	Constituency
Emil Vasseur			National Party	1917–1919	Stockholm County
Mauritz Västberg			Social Democratic Party	1933–1940	Västernorrland and Jämtland Counties
Ernst von Vegesack			independent	1879–1887	Gotland County
Gustaf Velander			National Party; National Organization of the Right	1933–1956	Västernorrland and Jämtland Counties
Axel Vennersten			Rightist Party	1930–1936	Älvsborg County
Ivar Vennerström			Social Democratic Party	1928–1936	Västernorrland and Jämtland Counties
Axel Vindahl			Free-minded National Association; Free-minded People's Party	1919–1925	Örebro County
Erik Vrang			Rightist Party	1922–1927	Skaraborg County

== W ==
Representative	Lifespan	Profession	Party	Years	Constituency
Nils Erik Wååg			Social Democratic Party	1964–1970	Blekinge and Kristianstad Counties
Axel Fredrik Wachtmeister			independent Scanian Party	1867–1875	Kristianstad County
Axel Hansson Wachtmeister			Protectionist Party; United Right Party; National Party	1905–1926	Blekinge County, Blekinge and Kristianstad Counties
Axel Knut Wachtmeister, see Axel Knut Trolle-Wachtmeister
Carl Fredrik Wachtmeister			independent	1882–1889	Södermanland County
Fredrik Wachtmeister			Protectionist Party; United Right Party; National Party	1895–1916	Södermanland County
Hans Wachtmeister			independent	1867–1877	Blekinge County
Hans Hansson Wachtmeister			Protectionist Party; United Right Party	1892–1910	Blekinge County
Henning Wachtmeister			Protectionist Party; United Right Party; National Party	1909–1911; 1918–1919	Uppsala County
Hugo Hansson Wachtmeister			Moderate Party of the Upper House	1905–1908	Blekinge County
Wilhelm Waern			independent	1876–1876	Älvsborg County
Carl Wærn			independent	1867–1899	City of Gothenburg
Lennart Wærn			independent	1879–1887	Gävleborg County
Ruben Wagnsson			Social Democratic Party	1928–1947	Kalmar and Gotland Counties
Gustaf Wahl			Social Democratic Party	1922–1924	City of Stockholm
Nils Wahlberg			Social Democratic Party	1939–1939	Södermanland and Västmanland Counties
Sten Wahlund	1901–1976	professor	Farmers' League	1944–1958	Skaraborg County
Primus Wahlmark			Social Democratic Party	1923–1950	Stockholm and Uppsala Counties
Gustaf Walin			Protectionist Party	1896–1907	Kalmar County Southern
Isak Wallberg			independent Protectionist Party	1876–1884; 1888–1891	Halland County, Älvsborg County
Wilhelm Wallberg			Protectionist Party	1891–1892	Halland County
Wilhelm Walldén			Minority Party; Moderate Party of the Upper House	1894–1906	City of Stockholm
Knut Agathon Wallenberg			independent National Party	1907–1919	City of Stockholm
Oscar Wallenberg			Ministerial Group independent	1867–1885	City of Stockholm
Anders Wallenius			independent	1874–1881; 1886–1889	Skaraborg County
Annie Wallentheim			Social Democratic Party	1952–1970	Stockholm and Uppsala Counties
Janne Walles			Social Democratic Party	1922–1940	Västernorrland and Jämtland Counties
Wilhelm Wallin			independent	1892–1898	Skaraborg County
Gunnar Wallmark			Rightist Party	1963–1970	Stockholm and Uppsala Counties
Lennart Wanhainen			Social Democratic Party	1964–1970	Västerbotten and Norrbotten Counties
Erik Wärnberg			Social Democratic Party	1957–1970	Östergötland County
Edvard Wavrinsky			Social Democratic Party	1912–1921	Västmanland County
Ernst Wehtje			Rightist Party	1945–1955	Malmöhus County
Gunnar Weibull			Rightist Party	1964–1964	Malmöhus County
Josef Weijne			Social Democratic Party	1951–1951	Kronoberg and Halland Counties
Hjalmar Weiland			People's Party	1948–1957	Jönköping County
August Weinberg			independent	1891–1908	Skaraborg County
Per Welander			Free-minded National Association	1918–1919	Jämtland County
Carl Wennberg			Protectionist Party	1907–1909	Jönköping County
Gunnar Wennerberg			independent Protectionist Party	1876–1901	Kronoberg County
Lars Werner			Left Party-Communists	1965–1970	City of Stockholm
Oscar Werner			Farmers' League	1950–1957	Värmland County
Fredrik Wester			Protectionist Party; United Right Party	1894–1911	Värmland County
Adolph Westman			independent	1867–1872	Kronoberg County
Karl Allan Westman			Farmers' League	1943–1947	Östergötland County
Karl Gustaf Westman			Farmers' National Organization; Farmers' League	1919–1943	Östergötland County
Wilhelm Westrup			National Party	1918–1919	Malmöhus County
Erik Wetter			People's Party	1945–1947	City of Gothenburg
Carl Gustaf Wickman			Social Democratic Party	1911–1921	Gävleborg County
Krister Wickman			Social Democratic Party	1967–1970	Kronoberg and Halland Counties
Ludvig Widell			National Party	1914–1933	Gothenburg and Bohus County
Martin Widén			People's Party	1961–1964	Västernorrland and Jämtland Counties
Henrik Adolf Widmark			independent	1882–1888	Norrbotten County
Olof Widmark			independent Minority Party	1877–1885; 1888–1896	Gävleborg County
Gustaf Widner			Social Democratic Party	1946–1949	Södermanland and Västmanland Counties
Sigfrid Wieselgren			Minority Party; Moderate Party of the Upper House independent	1888–1910	City of Gothenburg
Ernst Wigforss			Social Democratic Party	1948–1953	Blekinge and Kristianstad Counties
Erik Wijk			Moderate Party of the Upper House	1905–1910	City of Gothenburg
Hjalmar Wijk			Free-minded National Association	1918–1921	City of Gothenburg
Ivar Wijk			Protectionist Party; United Right Party	1892–1911	Skaraborg County
August Wijkander			Moderate Party of the Upper House	1908–1911	City of Gothenburg
Theodor Wijkander			independent	1868–1881	Värmland County
Knut Wijkmark			independent	1889–1891	Skaraborg County
Uno Wijkström			National Party; National Organization of the Right	1928–1935	Kalmar and Gotland Counties
Axel Wikberg			Centre Party	1965–1968	Västernorrland and Jämtland Counties
Olof Wiklund			Social Democratic Party	1942–1945	City of Stockholm
Valfrid Wikner			Social Democratic Party	1962–1964	Västernorrland and Jämtland Counties
Helmer Wikström			Social Democratic Party	1942–1943	Blekinge and Kristianstad Counties
Jan-Erik Wikström			People's Party	1970–1970	City of Stockholm
Carl Winberg			Social Democratic Left Party; Socialist Party	1919–1930	Norrbotten County, Västerbotten and Norrbotten Counties
Gustaf Windahl			United Right Party	1910–1911	Kopparberg County
Lars Wingqvist			Protectionist Party	1892–1894	Älvsborg County
Rolf Wirtén			People's Party	1966–1970	Jönköping County
Karl Wistrand			Rightist Party	1937–1953	City of Stockholm
Hugo Witzell			Social Democratic Party	1940–1940	Blekinge and Kristianstad Counties
Nils Wohlin			Farmers' National Organization; Farmers' League independent National Party	1919–1928; 1932–1934	Malmöhus County, Kalmar and Gotland Counties
Tor Wolgast			Farmers' League	1956–1959	Blekinge and Kristianstad Counties
Herman Wrangel			Protectionist Party; United Right Party; National Party	1909–1910; 1914–1919	Blekinge County, Gothenburg and Bohus County
Johan Wolmer Wrangel von Brehmer			independent Protectionist Party	1887–1907	Malmöhus County
Casimir Wrede			independent	1870–1878	Kristianstad County
Henrik Wrede			Moderate Party of the Upper House	1910–1911	Jönköping County

== Z ==
Representative	Lifespan	Profession	Party	Years	Constituency
Otto von Zweigbergk			Free-minded National Association	1915–1919	Kristianstad County
