= Lobbo =

Lobbo is a Malian surname. Notable people with the surname include:

- Ba Lobbo, nineteenth century Malian imam
- Shaykhu Ahmadu ibn Muhammadu Lobbo (1773–1845), Malian imam

== See also ==
- Löbbo
- Lobo (disambiguation)
