= Edvard Rodhe =

Edvard Rodhe was the name of two Swedish theologians and churchmen:

- Edvard Herman Rodhe (1845–1932), Bishop of Gothenburg 1888–1929 on List of members of the upper house of the Riksdag
- Edvard Magnus Rodhe (1878–1954), Bishop of Lund 1925–1948, son of the above
