= Egnell =

Egnell is a Swedish surname. Notable people with the surname include:

- Claes Egnell (1916–2012), Swedish sport shooter and modern pentathlete
- Viktor Egnell (1872–1952), Swedish politician
