= Protectionist Party (Sweden) =

Defunct political party in Sweden

The Protectionist Majority Party of the Upper House (Swedish: Första kammarens protektionistiska majoritetsparti) was a political party in Sweden, founded in 1888. It was a conservative and protectionist party. Two politicians from this party, Gustaf Åkerhielm and Christian Lundeberg, served as Prime Minister of Sweden. In 1912 the Protectionist Party became part of the National Party.
