= Albin Andersson =

Swedish farmer, bank manager, and politician

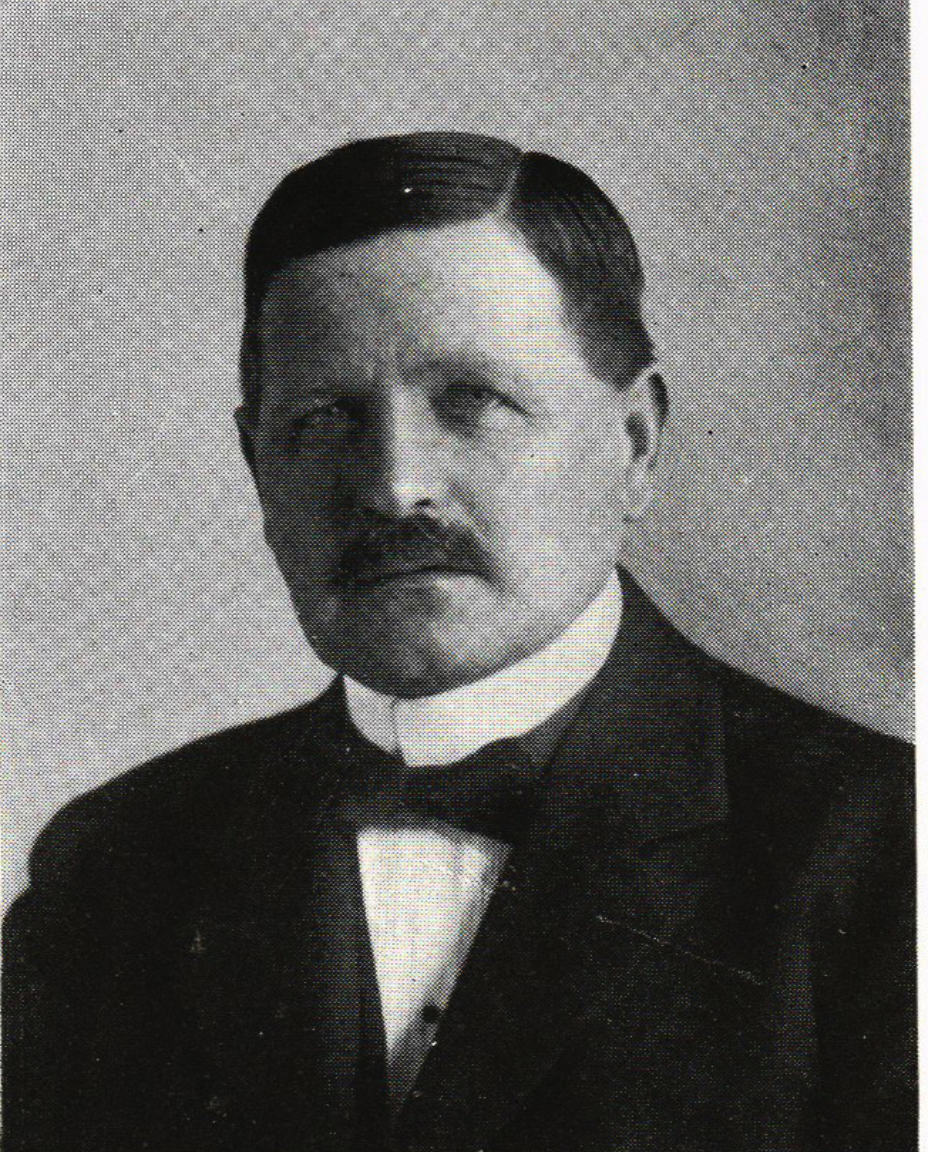
- Albin Andersson
- Born: December 22, 1873
- Died: July 30, 1949 (aged 75)

Albin Andersson (22 December 1873 – 30 July 1949) was a Swedish farmer, bank manager, and politician. He was a member of the Farmer's League (Centre Party), and represented Gothenburg and Bohus County in the upper house of the Swedish bicameral parliament in 1922–1925.
