= Gustaf Strömberg =

Swedish-American astronomer (1882–1962)

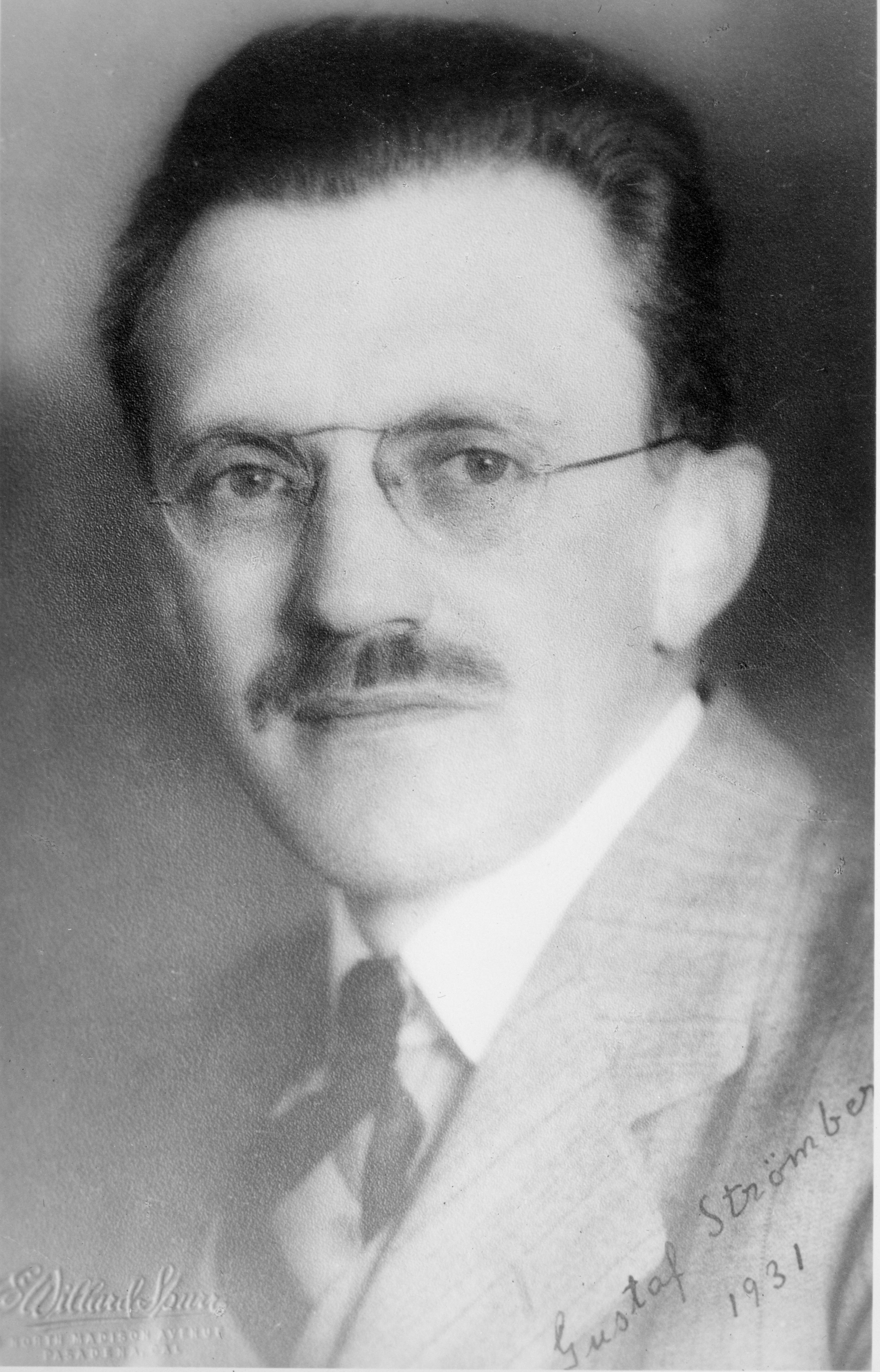
- Born: 16 December 1882; Gothenburg
- Died: 30 January 1962 (aged 79)
- Occupation: Astronomer

Gustaf Benjamin Strömberg (16 December 1882 – 30 January 1962) was a Swedish-born American astronomer who worked at the Mount Wilson Observatory in California. He went on to examine ideas on the non-physical world, the soul, psychic and other phenomena that would now be termed the paranormal, making him a pioneer of the study of the paranormal. Interpreting ideas from mathematical physics on waves and fields, he suggested that living cells were influenced by such invisible entities and that human memories could be immortal, as also claiming a mathematical support for the existence of a soul.

== Life and work ==
Strömberg was born in Gothenburg to Johanna Elisabeth née Noehrman and Bengt Johan Gustaf Lorentz Strömberg. He studied at the University of Lund, obtaining a PhD in 1916. He then moved to the Carnegie Institution and worked at the Mount Wilson Observatory. He became a naturalized citizen of the United States in 1922. His astronomy work had largely been on the studies of star velocities. His work included studies on the luminosity of the long-period variable stars and his work on the “asymmetry of stellar motions” making use of the Lindblad–Oort theory of galactic rotation suggested globular clusters with some stars effectively moving towards us. He then used this to estimate radial velocities.

Alongside his astronomy he began to consider the non physical world. In 1940 he published his thoughts on the soul and its immortality in The Soul of the Universe, dedicated to the philosopher John Elof Boodin. He resigned from the observatory in 1946 to pursue his parallel projects dealing with the psychic world. In his works he suggested that human memories could be immortal and explained it using the idea that there were waves in space and time that could not be destroyed. He also suggested that all living cells were surrounded by fields, although his explanation was found to be confusing and difficult to understand. George Gamow, for instance, in a review pointed out that wave functions did not have physical world counterparts. Strömberg attempted to settle some of the objections, particularly those raised by biologists, in his next book The Searchers (1948), in which he presented his ideas in the form of a story with the central character being a Russian Marxist refugee with an open mind, named Boris Charkoff, who attends the discussions of a society called the Searchers.

== Selected publications ==
- Strömberg, Gustaf (1940). The Soul of the Universe. Philadelphia: David McKay Company.
