= Ernst Eskhult =

Swedish politician

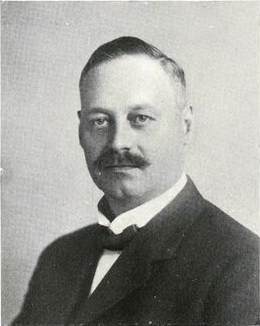

Ernst Eskhult (October 20, 1880 - July 24, 1955) was a Swedish politician. He was a member of the Centre Party. He was a member of the Parliament of Sweden (upper chamber) from 1919.
