= Casimir Petre =

Swedish politician (1831–1889)

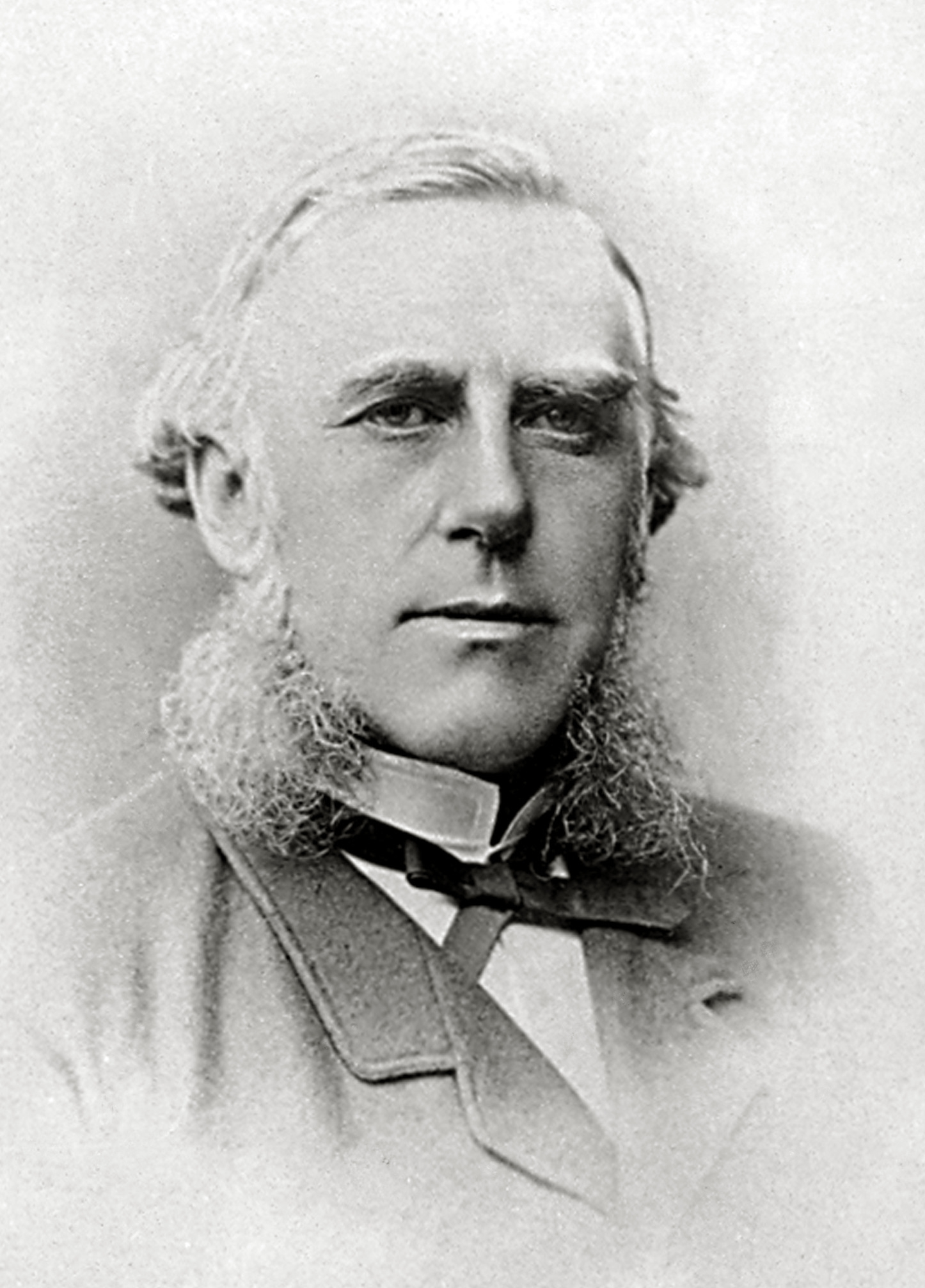
Casimir Petre

Knut Casimir Petre (24 April 1831 – 9 September 1889) was a Swedish ironmaster and member of the Riksdag.

Petre was born in Ovansjö, Gävleborg County, and was the son of ironmaster and member of the Riksdag of the Estates Johan Theodor (Thore) Petre and Gustava Ulrica Elisabeth Munktell. In 1848, he finished his gymnasium education and joined the navy, circumnavigating the globe on the frigate HSwMS Eugenie between 1851 and 1853. He became second lieutenant before leaving the navy in 1859.

Petre owned the blast furnace in Hofors in Torsåker Parish, Uppsala. He was a member of the bourgeoisie estate in the 1865–1866 Riksdag of the Estates and member of the Första kammaren (upper house) in the 1867–1877 Riksdag, elected for Gävleborg County constitutency.

In 1861, he married artist Elisabeth Wærn (1835–1898). Their children included Gustava (born 1863), Kerstin Clason (born 1865), Helena (born 1866), Fredric (born 1864), Betty (born 1870), Gunilla (born 1871), and Agnes (born 1878).

Petre died in Inverness, Danderyd, Stockholm.

== Sources ==
- Förteckning å vällofliga Borgareståndets ledamöter vid lagtima riksdagen i Stockholm år 1865, borgarståndets protokoll 21/10 1865
- Hildebrand, Albin (1913). "Casimir Petre". Svenskt porträttgalleri (in Swedish). Vol. XXVI. Register till hela verket. Förteckning öfver subskribenterna. p. 582 – via Project Runeberg.
