= Oscar Ericson =

Swedish politician (1866–1943)

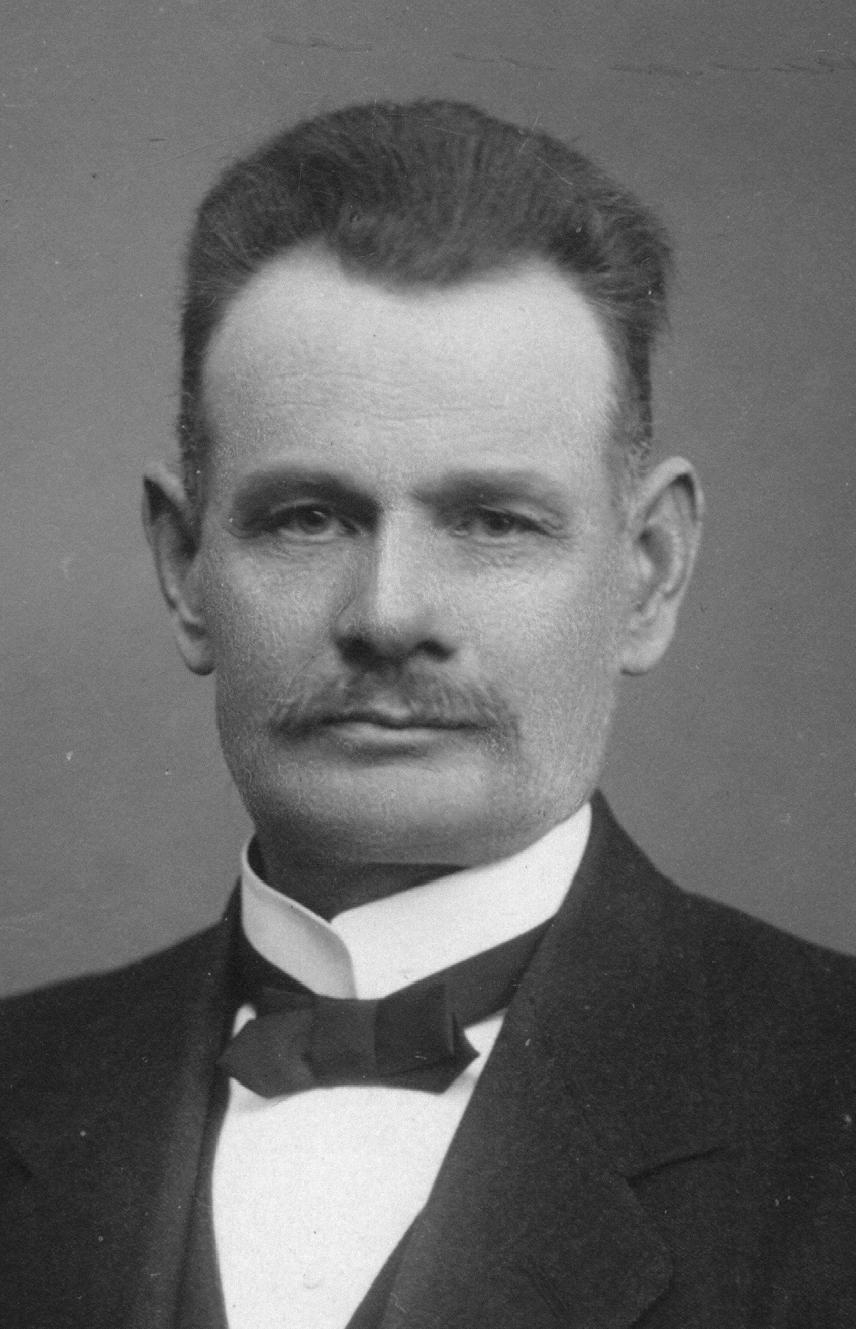
Oscar Ericson 1917

Carl Oscar Ericson (20 December 1866 – 3 September 1943), known as Ericson i Oberga, was a Swedish politician. He was the son of county councillor Gustav Ericson (1831–1909). He emigrated in the mid-1880s for 6 years to Chicago, but returned to manage the family leasehold Oberga, which he bought in 1914 together with the adjoining Göberga and became the owner of the two largest properties of the parish. In his youth he joined the liberal party, but switched to the new Centre Party and was elected as its representative to the Parliament of Sweden (lower chamber) in 1917 and to the upper chamber from 1922 to 1937. He was in particular a member of the Ways and Means Committee and later State auditor. Ericson locally presided over numerous public activities. He married Emilia Johansdotter in 1899 and had a son Ragnar and a daughter Viola.
