= Oscar Larsson =

Swedish ice hockey player

- Born: March 21, 1995 (age 29); Sweden
- Height: 5 ft 10 in (178 cm)
- Weight: 154 lb (70 kg; 11 st 0 lb)
- Position: Forward
- Shoots: Right
- SHL team: Brynäs IF
- NHL draft: Undrafted
- Playing career: 2015–present

Oscar Larsson (born March 21, 1995) is a Swedish ice hockey player. He is currently playing with Brynäs IF of the Swedish Hockey League (SHL).

Larsson made his Swedish Hockey League debut playing with Brynäs IF during the 2014–15 SHL season. On August 26, 2015, Larsson committed to play Division 3 hockey for Northland College.
