= Petrus Gränebo =

Swedish politician

Carl Petrus Valdemar Gränebo (28 December 1881 – 4 October 1959) was a Swedish politician. He was a member of the Centre Party.
