= Per Andersson i Koldemo =

Swedish politician

Per Andersson i Koldemo (14 February 1876 – 4 February 1944) was a Swedish politician. He was a member of the Farmer's League (Centre Party), representing Gävleborg County in the upper house of the Swedish bicameral parliament from 1922 until his death in 1944.
