= Johan Johanson i Tväråselet =

Swedish politician

Johan Johanson i Tväråselet (1870–1949) was a Swedish politician. He was a member of the Centre Party.
