= Anna Sjöström-Bengtsson =

Swedish politician

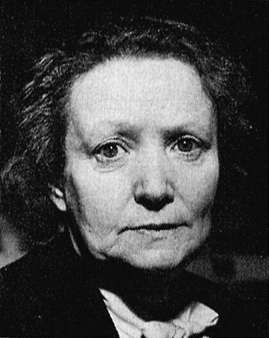
Anna Sjöström-Bengtsson

Anna Maria Sjöström-Bengtsson (1889-1969) was a Swedish politician (Swedish Social Democratic Party).

Sjöström-Bengtsson was an MP of the First Chamber of the Parliament of Sweden in 1943–1958.

Sjöström-Bengtsson focused foremost on social politics, access to health care, equal education, and social insurance.

Sjöström-Bengtsson worked as a primary school teacher. She was the second woman in the Upper Chamber after Kerstin Hesselgren.
