= Georg Carlsson =

Swedish politician (1892–1975)

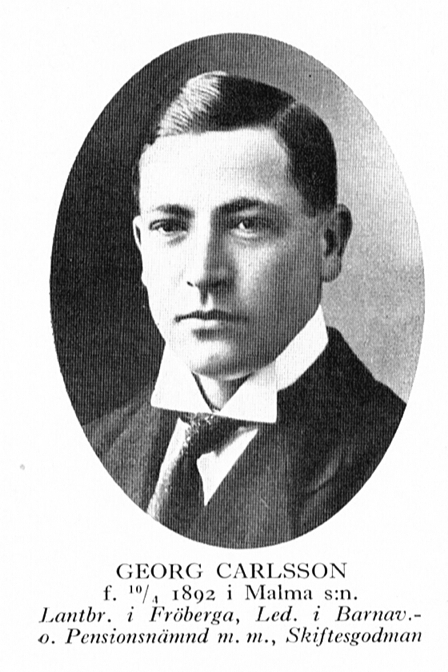
Georg Carlsson 1892

Georg Carlsson (10 April 1892 – 8 January 1975) was a Swedish politician. He was a member of the Centre Party. He was a member of the Parliament of Sweden (upper chamber) from 10 January 1953 to 13 December 1963.

During his parliamentary career Carlsson made the following motions:

- 1954: Temperance policy
- 1959: Rent regulation
- 1960: Safety at nuclear installations
- 1962: Proposal to establish a national transport institute
- 1963: National transport policy
