= Gustav Andersson i Löbbo =

Swedish politician

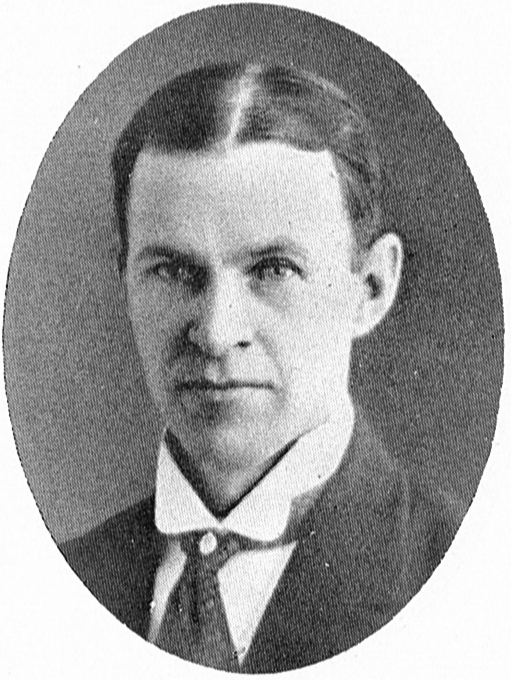

Gustav Andersson i Löbbo (27 January 1890 – 2 August 1962) was a Swedish politician. He was a member of the Centre Party.
