= Viktor Egnell =

Swedish politician

Viktor Egnell (March 22, 1872 – March 13, 1952) was a Swedish politician. He was a member of the Centre Party. He was a member of the Parliament of Sweden (upper chamber) 1936–1943.
