= National Party (Sweden) =

Political party in the upper house of Swedish parliament

The National Party of the Upper House (Swedish: Första kammarens nationella parti), commonly known as the National Party (Swedish: Nationella partiet), was a conservative political party in the upper house of Swedish parliament, formed in 1912 through the merging of the United Right Party (Swedish: Förenade högerpartiet) and the Moderate Party of the Upper House (Swedish: Första kammarens moderata parti). In 1935 the party merged into the parliamentary group of the General Electoral Union (Swedish: Allmänna valmansförbundet), together with the Farmer and Bourgeoisie Party (Swedish: Lantmanna- och borgarepartiet).

== Leaders ==
- Gottfrid Billing, 1912–1913
- Ernst Trygger, 1913–1923
- Johan Nilsson, 1923
- Axel Vennersten, 1924
- Ernst Trygger, 1924–1933
- Johan Bernhard Johansson, 1933–1935
