= Carl Johan Schlyter =

Swedish jurist and publisher (1795–1888)

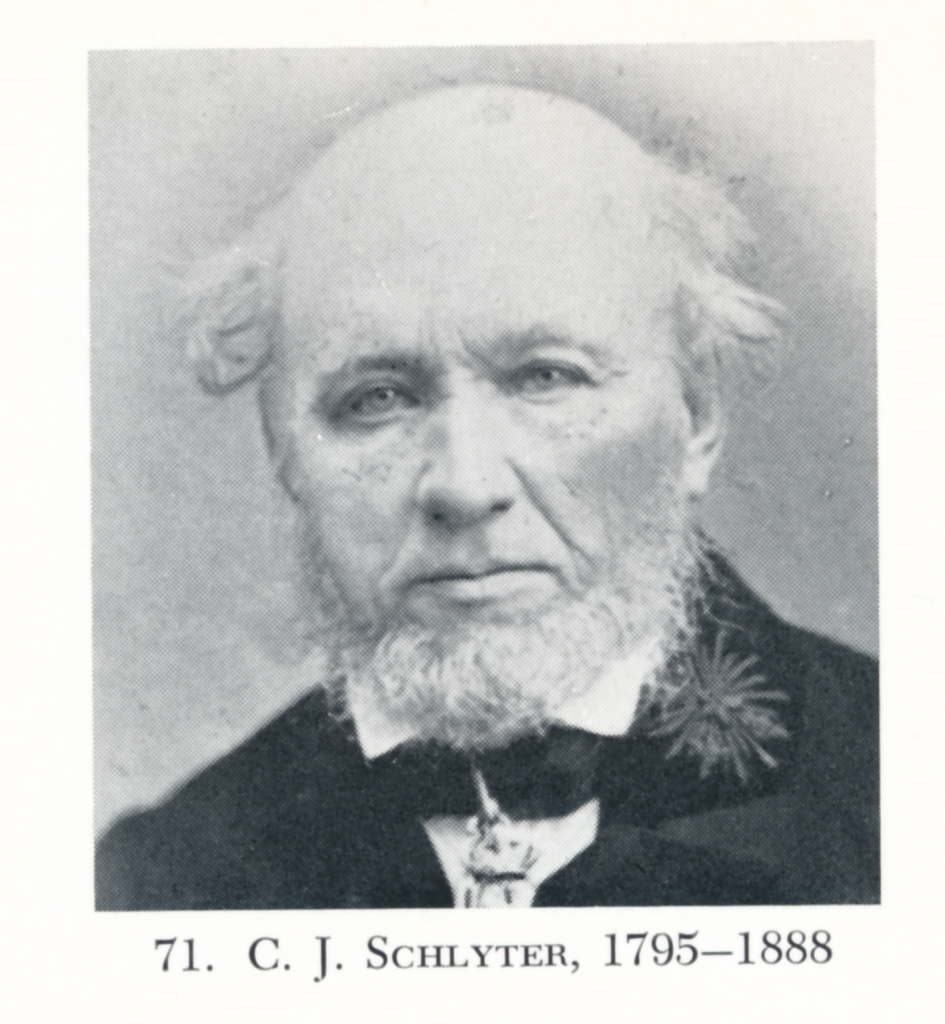
- Born: 29 January 1795; Karlskrona, Blekinge, Sweden
- Died: 29 December 1888 (aged 93); Lund, Scania, Sweden
- Resting place: St. Peter's Priory cemetery, Lund
- Occupation(s): Jurist, publisher
- Known for: Publishing medieval Swedish laws
- Spouse: Carolina Christina Liljeschöld (m. 1835)
- Children: 6, including Ragnar Schlyter

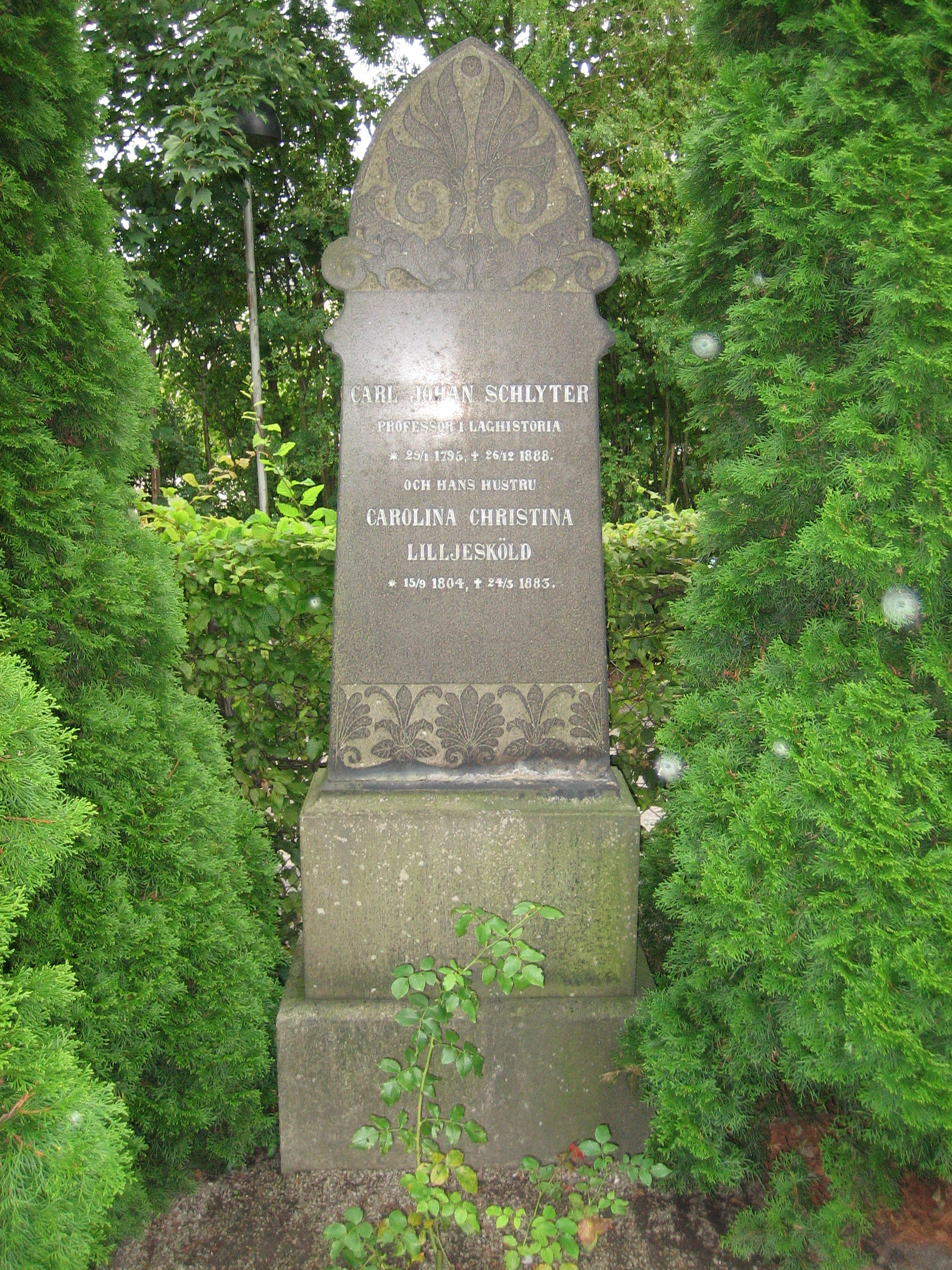
Schlyter's headstone. Cemetery at St. Peter's Priory, Lund.

Carl Johan Schlyter (29 January 1795 – 29 December 1888) was a Swedish jurist and law publisher. He is known for publishing scholarly editions of the medieval Swedish laws in 13 volumes, a process which took over 50 years.

== Biography ==
=== Background and education ===
Schlyter was born in Karlskrona, Blekinge, Sweden. Schlyter belonged to an originally Northern German family that immigrated to Denmark, while Scania belonged to this kingdom. His father was Admiralty Chamberlain and later General War Commissary Carl Johan Schlyter and his mother was Lovisa Maria Hjelm. He received a private education and after graduating in 1807, Schlyter continued his studies at Lund University under the supervision of his brother-in-law, adjunct (later bishop) Wilhelm Faxe. His instructors there included Carl Adolph Agardh in algebra and Esaias Tegnér in Swedish. He took the preliminary examination (kameralexamen) in 1811, the examination for the court clerkship (examen juridicum) in 1812 and the chancellery examination (kansliexamen) in 1813.

In 1814, he received his magister degree in Rostock, Germany, and in 1816 he was appointed by Professor (and mentor) Johan Holmbergson as docent in criminal law at Lund University. In 1818 he received his juris utriusque there, received his licentiate in law in 1820 and doctorate in law in the same year (a rare degree at the time, in which Schlyter and Hans Samuel Collin were the first to take the juris doktor there from the founding of Lund University until the end of the 19th century).

He was a notary and honorary member of Blekingska student nation at Lund University.

=== Career ===
In order to pursue a career in the civil service, Schlyter moved to Stockholm the same year, where he served in the Chancellor of Justice's Office and the Svea Court of Appeal from 1820 to 1822. In 1822 a new field opened up for him, when, with the encouragement of Johan Gabriel Richert, he was awarded the Royal Majesty's commission to publish Sweden's old laws together with Collin. In conjunction with this assignment, Schlyter applied for and was granted an unpaid professorship at Lund University in 1822, a position he held until 1835. He and Collin published the first volume, Vestgötalagen, in 1827, complete with a stemma of the manuscripts – potentially the first stemma.

In 1835, when he received the title of professor (professors namn), he was appointed to a new professorship in law history in Uppsala, but by 1838 he had moved back to Lund, where he was appointed to the professorship in general legal experience. He was rector of Lund University in 1839–1840, succeeding Johan Henrik Thomander. In 1840 he exchanged his professorship position for the professorship of general legal history, which he held until 23 November 1852. From this time until 1876, when he was dismissed, he enjoyed a permanent leave of absence for the publication of the ancient provincial laws. Schlyter continued the work alone after Collin's death (1833), successfully completing it in 1877. Regarding the project, he is said to have stated, "it would be better to delay this for another 50 years than for such an important work to fall into unskilled hands".

Offered a position on the Legal Advisory Committee (lagberedningen) in 1844, Schlyter accepted it unhesitatingly. Its main task was to draft new civil and criminal legislation, which he approached from a conservative perspective. He remained on the committee until 1848.

=== Awards ===
Schlyter, who was awarded a jubilee doctor in philosophy (1865) and law (1870, both in Lund), also earned membership in the Royal Swedish Academy of Letters, History and Antiquities (1837), the Royal Swedish Academy of Sciences (1856) and several other learned societies, among other scientific honors. In 1838 the Swedish Academy awarded him the Royal Prize "for merits in literature and language" and in 1860 unanimously called him to membership, a call which Schlyter did not accept, mainly because he, at the age of 66, considered that he needed all his remaining time and energy for the completion, if possible, of the great work of law. In 1864 he was awarded the Letterstedt Award for Excellent Work by the Academy of Sciences.

From 1869 Schlyter was also a member of the Royal Swedish Academy of Music, in recognition of his outstanding talent as a pianist.

When the Swedish Academy celebrated its centenary in 1886, it awarded Schlyter one of two major gold medals minted for the occasion (the other went to Zachris Topelius).

=== Religion ===
Schlyter was deeply religious. His family's religious background includes Joachim Slüter, a prominent Reformation priest during the 1500s. Along with Holmbergson, he belonged to influential provost Henric Schartau's circles. He published Schartau's theological writings and sermons after Schartau's death as well as translating the works of theologian Heinrich Wilhelm Rinck. Schlyter also wrote on religious topics: he wrote and published Om Bibelkommissionens omarbetade öfversättning af Nya Testamentet ('On the Bible Commission's Revised Translation of the New Testament') in 1878 and a children's catechism in 1880. Schlyter made a religious dedication in the final volume of his legal work, stating, "If the question has to be raised whether somebody should be honored for this work, the honor belongs to Him, Him alone, who is mighty in the weak and who has given courage and force to its realization".

=== Family ===
Schlyter married Carolina Christina Liljeschöld in Uppsala in 1835. They had six children: Carl Oscar Schlyter (1836–1907), Johan Vilhelm Schlyter (1837–1885), Anna Maria Helena Thyrén née Schlyter (1839–1914), Svanhild Augusta Erichsson née Schlyter (1841–1920), Hildegard Amalia Gadde née Schlyter (1843–1892), and Gustaf Ragnar Schlyter (1845–1927). Veterinarian Hjalmar Kinberg was his nephew, and his grandson, Karl Schlyter (son of Gustaf Ragnar), was a lawyer and minister of justice.

=== Death ===
Schlyter died in Lund in 1888. He is buried in the monastery cemetery in Lund.

=== Memorials and legacy ===
In 1889, the Swedish Academy struck a memorial medal and, at its annual celebration on 20 December the same year, held a memorial service for him. The Academy of Sciences followed suit in both respects on 31 March 1894.

Schlyter's literary importance is closely connected with his publication of the Samling af Sweriges gamle lagar, in Latin Corpus juris sveogothorum antiqui, published 1827–1877, which, in 13 volumes, the last eleven published by Schlyter alone, constitutes a monumental work.

== Works ==
- De principiis legislationis poenalis (1816)
- Tentamina ad illustrandam historiam juris scandinaivici (1819)
- "Anmärkningar . . . angående det fordna förhållandet mellan domare och nämnd". Svea (2nd ed.). 1824.
- Appendices to Johan Christofer Lindblad's thesis Om dråp och mord, i anledning af den angående detta arbete förda strid (1832)
- Om laghistoriens studium och dess förhållande till rättsvetenskapens öfriga delar (1835)
- "Om Sveriges äldsta indelning i landskap och landskapslagarnes upkomst". Juridiska Afhandlingar. 1–2, 1836, 1879, new edition 1891. 1835.
- Corpus iuris sueo-gotorum antiqui. Samling af Sweriges gamla lagar, Vol. 13 (in Swedish). Lund: C. W. K. Gleerup. 1877. hdl:2077/42457.
- Om bibelkommissionens omarbetade översättning av Nya testamentet. 1878.
- I rättstafningsfrågan: afryck ur företalet til Samling af Sveriges Gamla Lagar. Vol. 13. Lund. 1878.
  - Several academic programs as well as minor papers in, among others, Kritische Zeitschrift für Rechtswissenschaft und Gesetzgebung des Auslandes.
  - Published almost all of the works left by provost Henric Schartau.

== Awards ==
- 1838 – Royal Prize
- 1873 – Commander Grand Cross, Order of the Polar Star

Academic offices
Preceded by Johan Henrik Thomander	Rector of Lund University; 1839–1840	Succeeded by Ebbe Samuel Bring
