= Birger Ekeberg =

Swedish jurist (1880–1968)

His Excellency Birger Ekeberg
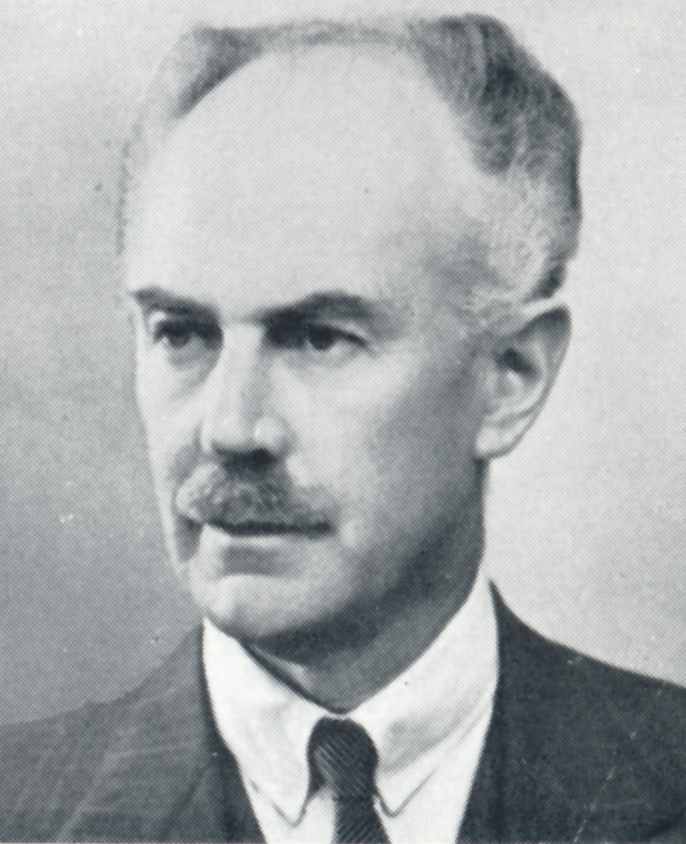

Minister of Justice
- In office 19 April 1923 – 18 October 1924
- Prime Minister: Gerhard Louis De Geer; Oscar von Sydow
- Preceded by: Assar Åkerman
- Succeeded by: Torsten Nothin
- In office 27 October 1920 – 13 October 1921
- Prime Minister: Ernst Trygger
- Preceded by: Assar Åkerman
- Succeeded by: Assar Åkerman

Marshal of the Realm
- In office 1946–1959
- Monarchs: Gustaf V Gustaf VI Adolf
- Preceded by: Axel Vennersten
- Succeeded by: Nils Vult von Steyern

Personal details
- Born: Lars Birger Ekeberg; 10 August 1880 Uppsala, Sweden
- Died: 30 November 1968 (aged 88)
- Party: Independent
- Education: Uppsala University
- Occupation: Lawyer

Birger Ekeberg (1880–1968) was a Swedish jurist and legal scholar. He served as justice minister of Sweden, and during his tenure the Swedish Parliament abolished the death penalty on 7 May 1921.

== Early life and education ==
Ekeberg was born in Uppsala on 10 August 1880. He graduated from Uppsala University in 1902 receiving a degree in law. He completed his PhD in private law at the same university in 1904 and became an associate professor the same year.

== Career ==
Following his graduation he joined his alma mater as a faculty member where he worked until 1907 when he began to work at the newly founded law faculty of Stockholm University. There he was the professor of private and civil law and a member of the Swedish Academy between 1945 and 1968.

He was first appointed minister of justice in 1920 and served in the post for one year. One of his most significant contributions was the annulment of the death penalty in Sweden in 1921. He was reappointed to the post in 1923 and remained in office until 1924. Then he worked at the council of justice which he also headed from 1927 and at the supreme court.

He was named as the head of the Court of Appeal in 1931. His term ended in 1946 with the royal permission. He was appointed Marshal of the Realm in 1947, replacing Axel Vennersten in the post. Ekeber remained in office until 1959.

In addition to these academic and political posts Ekeberg was the board member of the following organizations: Stockholm University (1927–1958), Stockholm School of Economics (1939–1957), Nobel Foundation (1947–1960) and Swedish Association of Judges (1935–1948).

== Work and death ==
Ekeberg published many articles most of which were about patent law and maritime law. He was among the founders of the law journal entitled Svensk Juristtidnings and was a member of its editorial board between in 1916 and 1960. He headed the journal's editorial board from 1940 to 1960.

He died on 30 November 1968.

=== Awards ===
Ekeberg was awarded honorary doctorate by Heidelberg University in 1923, by the University of Copenhagen in 1945, by the University of Helsinki in 1955 and by Stockholm University in 1953.
