= Johan Magnus Almqvist =

Swedish theologian (1799–1873)

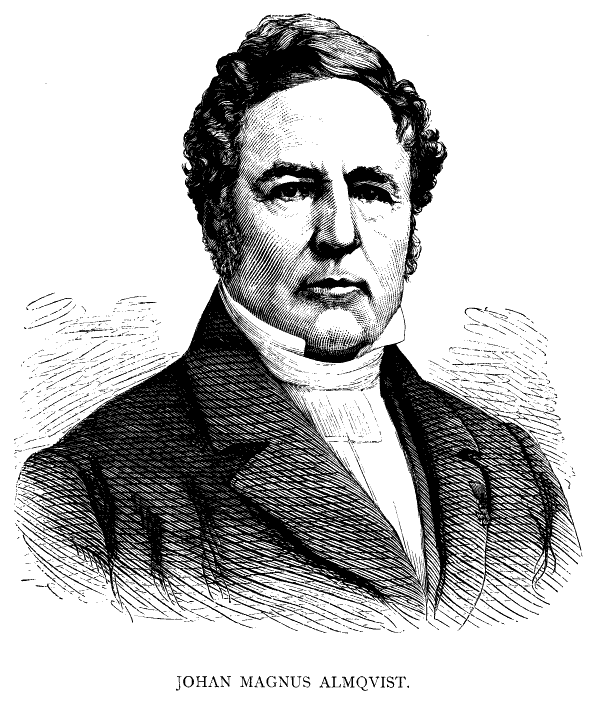
- Born: September 6, 1799; Stockholm, Sweden
- Died: October 9, 1873 (aged 74); Skärstad, Jönköping County, Sweden
- Occupations: Theologian, priest, member of the Riksdag

Johan Magnus Almqvist (September 6, 1799 – October 9, 1873) was a Swedish theologian and parliamentarian.

== Biography ==
Almqvist was born in Stockholm, Sweden, to civil servant and vicar Sven Johan Almqvist and Gustava Brandelius. He began his studies at Uppsala University in 1819 and thereafter studied at Lund University, receiving his master's degree in philosophy in 1823. The following year he was ordained. In 1830, Almqvist became vicar of Skärstad Church near Jönköping and remained so until his death. From 1844 to 1866 he was a contractual provost and member of the Riksdag of the Estates. As a politician, he was a liberal and belonged to the opposition party within the clergy against its conservative majority. With regard to criminal law, inheritance law, schools, etc., he belonged to the reformists and voted for the representation bill in the 1865 Riksdag. He was a "staunch supporter" of Louis Gerhard De Geer, the country's first prime minister, at the 1865 Riksdag. Almqvist also worked for the cause of temperance and was on the 1859–1860 Riksdag committee on spirits.

In a polemic with priest Peter Wieselgren (1827) concerning the church's confessional writings, Almqvist asserted "biblical faithfulness" as opposed to "confessional faithfulness", and this biblical Christianity remained his platform during many ecclesiastical battles concerning the church constitution, the new church manual, etc., when he rejected both the church theology from Lund and the free church revival movements. Almqvist was also an author of theological works.

He became a member of the Order of the Polar Star, a Swedish order of chivalry, in 1862.

Almqvist married Fredrika Eneström (1800–1885) on July 7, 1830. He was the brother of politician Ludvig Teodor Almqvist.

He died in Skärstad in 1873.

== Bibliography ==
- De variis reipublicse Suio-Gothica; rege.ndae formulis, 1823 British Library, Historical Print Editions ISBN 9781241539849
- Försök att bevisa öfverensstämmelsen emellan lutherska kyrkans symboliska böcker eller Ett annat svar på frågan: hvilken är Sveriges religion? 1827 Stockholm, Bernh. Magn. Bredberg.
- Tal vid hof-destillatoren herr Abraham Bergs begrafning i Storkyrkans grafchor, 1829 (Stockholm, published by P. A. Norstedt & Söner)
- Öfver nya katekesen, i und. Förslag till allmän granskning utgifven, 1873
