= Hanaskog Castle =

Castle in Scania, Sweden

- Hanaskogs slott
- Östra Göinge Municipality
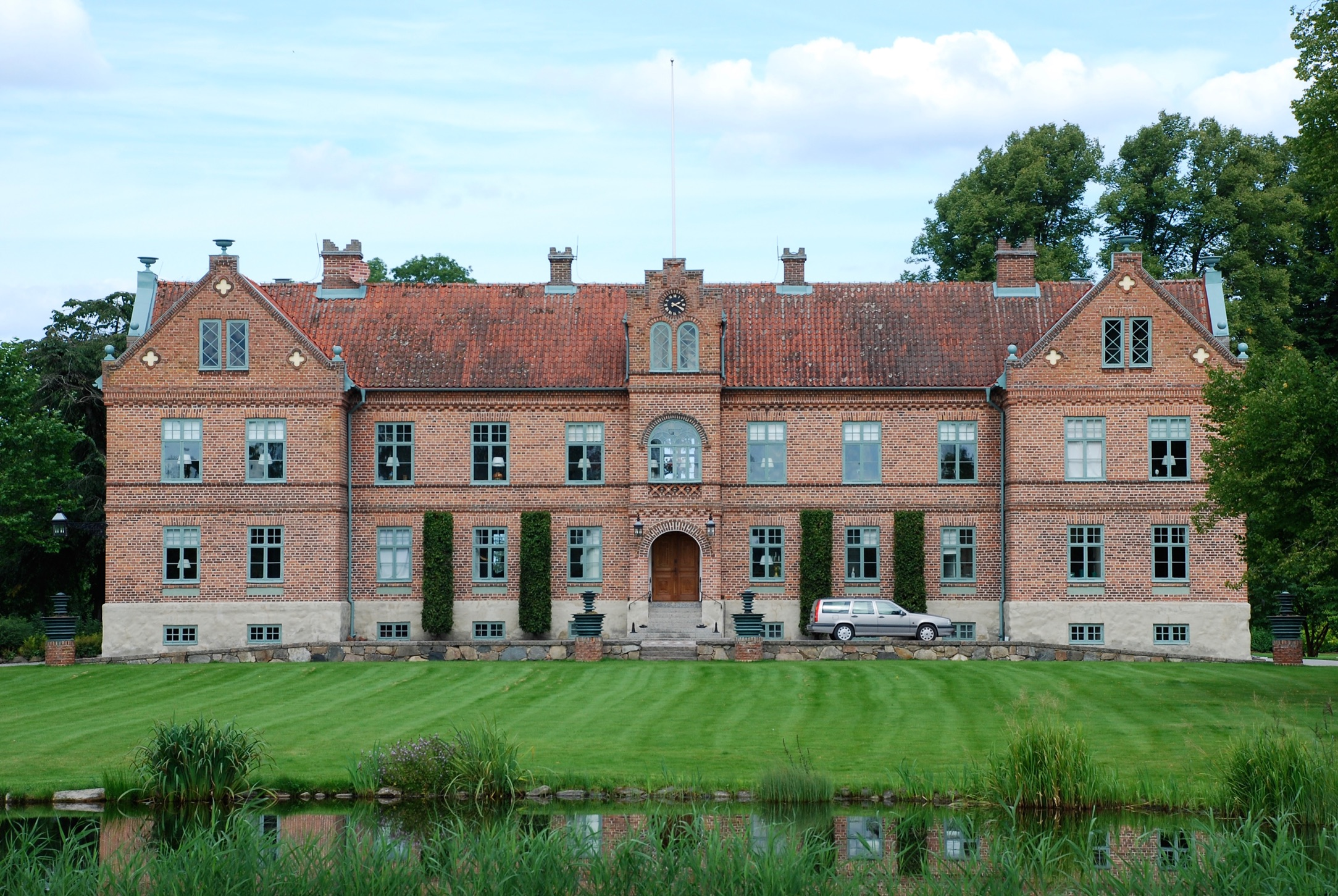
- Hanaskog

Site information
- Type: Castle
- Open to the public: No

Location
- Scania, Sweden
- Location within Skåne
- Coordinates: 56.151389°N 14.113611°E

Site history
- Built: 1852-1854

Hanaskog Castle (Swedish: Hanaskogs slott) is a manor house at Östra Göinge Municipality in Scania, Sweden.

== History ==
In 1827, Hanaskog was sold to Count Carl Axel Wachtmeister (1795–1865), who owned the fideicommission Vanås. In 1852–1854, had the main building renovated and extended on two floors and turned the appearance into a manor house. Hanaskog ownership was transferred by 1891 to Baron Gerhard Louis De Geer (1854–1935), governor of Kristianstad County and son of countess Karolina Lovisa Wachtmeister (1826–1910) and Louis Gerhard De Geer af Finspång (1818–1896), Prime Minister of Sweden.

== See also ==
- List of castles in Sweden
