= Skärstad Church =

Coordinates: 57.8820°N 14.3736°E

- Skärstads kyrka
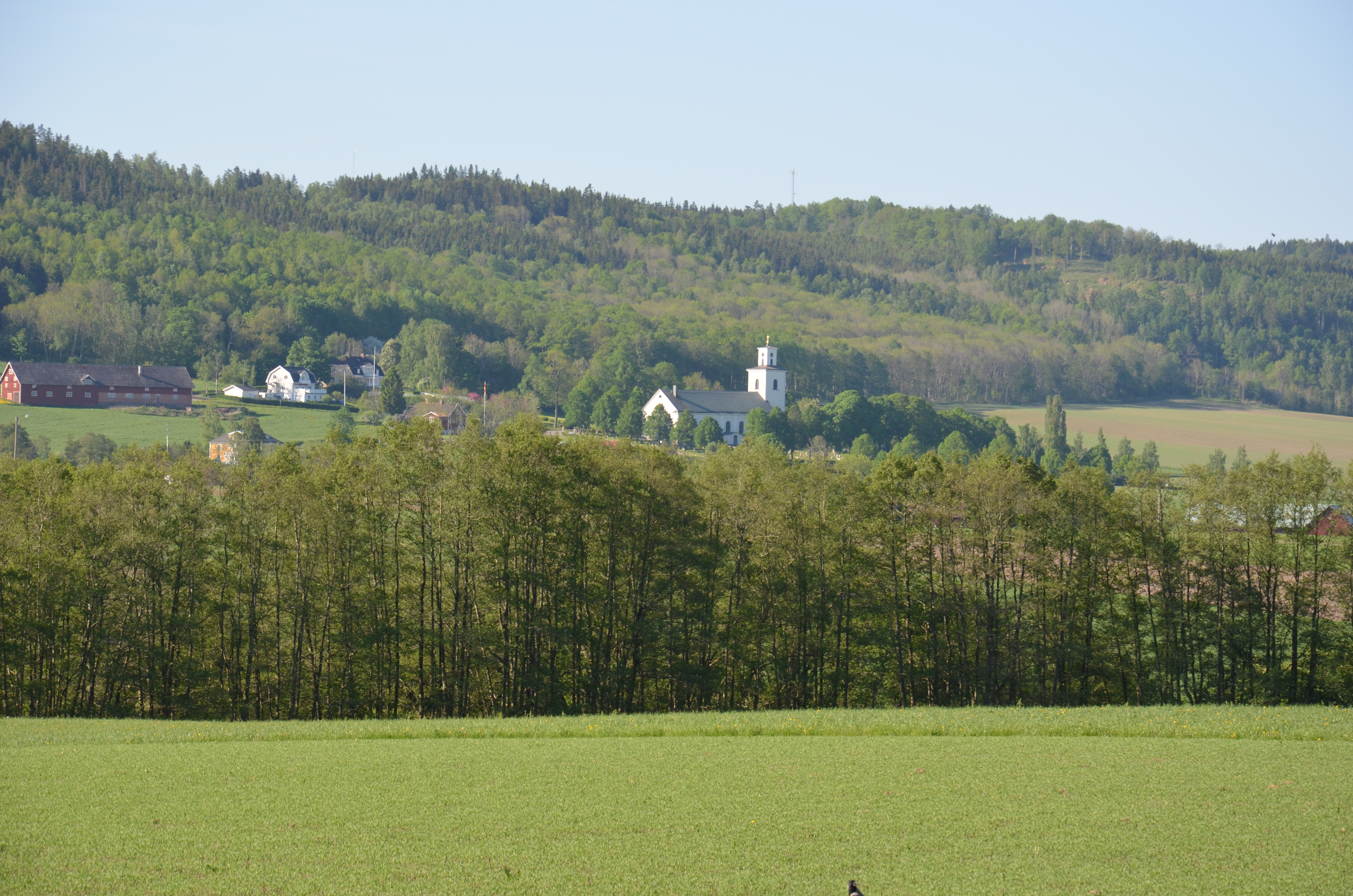
- Skärstad Church in May 2012
- Skärstad Church
- Location: Skärstad
- Country: Sweden
- Denomination: Church of Sweden

History
- Consecrated: 17 October 1819 (first church service); 27 May 1827 (official inauguration)

Administration
- Diocese: Växjö
- Parish: Skärstad-Ölmstad

Skärstad Church (Swedish: Skärstads kyrka) is a church building in Skärstad in Sweden. Belonging to the Skärstad-Ölmstad Parish of the Church of Sweden, it was built in the early 19th century, replacing a demolished 15th century church.

The first church service inside was held on 17 October 1819, while the church was officially inaugurated on 27 May 1827 by Bishop Esaias Tegnér

Swedish theologian Johan Magnus Almqvist was a church clergyman here until his death in 1873.
