= Natanael Gärde =

Swedish jurist and politician (1880–1968)

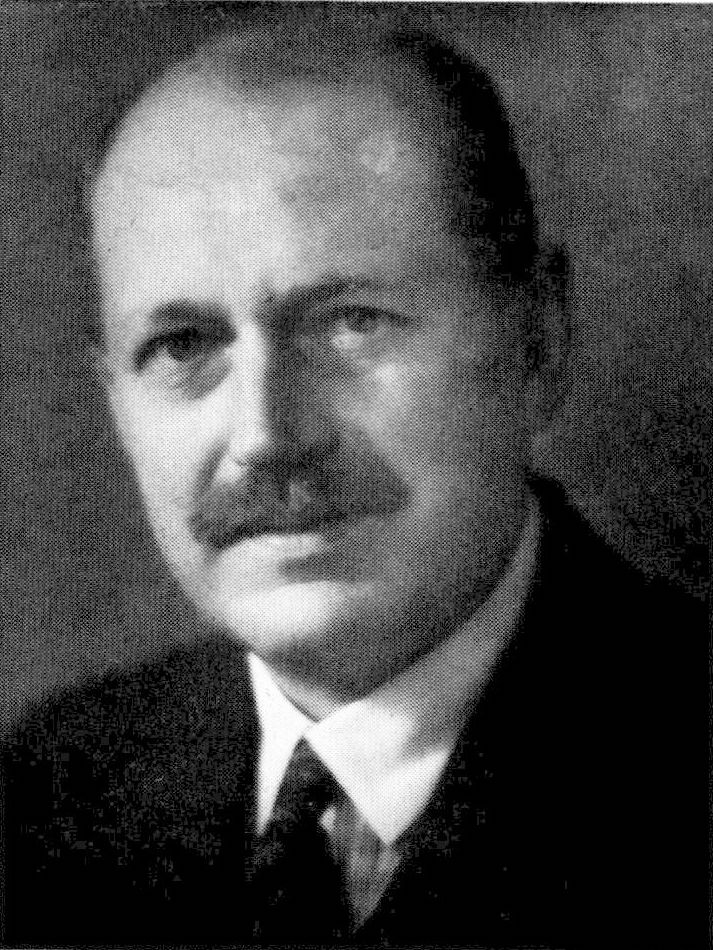

Minister of Justice
- In office 7 June 1930 – 24 September 1932
- Succeeded by: Karl Schlyter

Minister of State
- In office 7 June 1926 – 2 October 1928
- Prime Minister: Carl Gustaf Ekman

Personal details
- Born: Johannes Natanael Gärde; 27 July 1880 Seglora parish, Älvsborg county
- Died: 28 January 1968 (aged 87) Stockholm
- Spouse: Märta Brink
- Children: Ingrid Gärde Widemar
- Parents: Johannes Bengtsson (father); Hedda Andersdtr (mother)
- Education: Uppsala University
- Occupation: Lawyer

Natanael Gärde (27 July 1880 – 28 January 1968) was a Swedish judge who served as the minister of justice between 1930 and 1932.

== Early life and education ==
Gärde was born in Seglora parish, Älvsborg county, on 27 July 1880. His parents were Johannes Bengtsson and Hedda Andersdtr. He received a degree in law from Uppsala University.

== Career ==
On 7 June 1926 Gärde was appointed minister of state to the cabinet led by Premier Carl Gustaf Ekman. His term ended on 2 October 1928. He was named minister of justice on 7 June 1930 and remained in the office until 24 September 1932. During his tenure Gärde managed to implement a proposal of the former minister Johan Thyrén in which fines to the detainees ability to pay were regulated. After leaving office Gärde headed the procedural law commission which was formed by his successor as minister of justice Karl Schlyter to reform the legal framework of Sweden in 1938.

== Personal life and death ==
Gärde married Märta Brink in 1909. Their daughter was Ingrid Gärde Widemar who was also a jurist and politician. Natanael Gärde died in Stockholm on 28 January 1968.

=== Awards ===
Gärde was awarded the Illis quorum by the Swedish government in 1948.
