= Torsten Nothin =

Swedish politician (1884–1972)

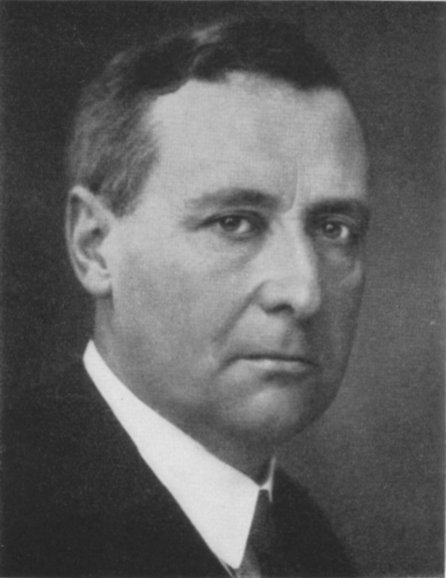

Governor of Stockholm
- In office 16 September 1933 – 30 September 1949
- Monarch: Gustaf V
- Preceded by: Henning Elmquist
- Succeeded by: Johan Hagander

Director General of the National Swedish Land Survey Board
- In office 18 June 1926 – 1933
- Preceded by: Gustaf Grefberg
- Succeeded by: Harald Malmberg

Minister for Justice
- In office 18 October 1924 – 7 June 1926
- Prime Minister: Hjalmar Branting; Rickard Sandler
- Preceded by: Birger Ekeberg
- Succeeded by: Johan Thyrén

Personal details
- Born: Torsten Karl Viktor Nothin; 13 February 1884 Värnamo, Sweden
- Died: 1 March 1972 (aged 88) Jönköping, Sweden
- Party: Social Democratic Party
- Spouse: Vera Åkerman (m. 1925; died 1955)
- Children: 1
- Education: Lund University

Torsten Karl Viktor Nothin (13 February 1884 – 1 March 1972) was a Swedish official and social democratic politician. He was Minister for Justice from 1924 to 1926 and Governor of Stockholm from 1933 to 1949.

== Early life ==
Nothin was born on 13 February 1884 in Voxtorp Parish, Värnamo Municipality, Jönköping County, Sweden, the son of Johannes Nothin, a vicar, and his wife Anna Bengtson. He completed his civil service degree in law (hovrättsexamen) in 1905.

== Career ==
Nothin was acting legal clerk (hovrättsfiskal) in 1910, a co-opted member of the court of appeal in 1911, acting audit secretary in 1915, legal clerk in 1914, and hovrättsråd in 1917. He then served as director of legal matters in the Ministry of Finance in 1918 and as audit secretary in 1920. Nothing was minister without portfolio from 10 March to 27 October 1920 and from 13 October 1921 to 19 April 1923. He then served as acting Director General of the National Swedish Land Survey Board from 1923 to 1924. Nothin was a member of the Första kammaren from 1921 to 1928, and served as Minister for Justice from 18 October 1924 to 7 June 1926. He was appointed Director General of the National Swedish Land Survey Board in 1926, and served as minister without portfolio from 24 September 1932 to 16 September 1933. Nothin was Governor of Stockholm from 1933 to 1949.

Nothin was chairman of about 20 committees and expert investigations, including the Committee on Courts of Appeal (Kommittén angående hovrätterna) in 1926, Dalautredningen from 1930 to 1932, Statens organisationsnämnd ("National Organization Board") until 1932, Aviation Investigation of 1934 (1934 års luftfartsutredning), the "Mother Investigation" of 1935 (1935 års "mammututredning") and the Municipal Tax Preparation of 1936 (1936 års kommunalskatteberedning), and various negotiating delegations between the Crown and the City of Stockholm. He was also the state's board member in Grängesbergsbolaget and in LKAB from 1923 to 1955.

Nothin was the initiator of, among other things the National Society for Road Safety, Society and Defence and Riksluftskyddsförbundet ("National Aerial-Protection Association"). He was chairman of the AB Papyrus, Saab AB, Rederi AB Nordstjernan, and vice chairman of the Thule Group. Nothin was initiator of and one of the publishers of Svensk lagsamling (1950–1954). Nothin was also chairman of a number of foundations and associations, including the Swedish Gymnastic Association (Svenska gymnastikförbundet) until 1936, the Swedish Flag Day, the Swedish Tourist Traffic Association (Svenska turisttrafikförbundet), the Stockholm Shooting Federation (Stockholms skytteförbund) (until 1944), the Stockholm Choral Society (Stockholms sångarförbund), and the Nordic Society.

== Personal life ==
In 1925, he married Vera Åkerman (1900–1955), the daughter of the District Judge Assar Åkerman and Othilda Borg. They had one child: Margareta (born 1927).

== Awards and decorations ==
- (Sweden) Knight and Commander of the Orders of His Majesty (30 September 1949)
- (Sweden) King Gustaf V's Jubilee Commemorative Medal (1948)
- (Sweden) H. M. The King's Medal

== Honours ==
- Member of the Royal Swedish Academy of Agriculture and Forestry (1930)
- Honorary Doctors of the Faculty of Law, Uppsala University (1932)

Political offices
| Preceded by Birger Ekeberg | Minister for Justice; 1924–1926 | Succeeded by Johan Thyrén |
| Preceded by Henning Elmquist | Governor of Stockholm; 1933–1949 | Succeeded by Johan Hagander |
