= Kviinge Church =

Medieval church in Kviinge, Sweden

- Kviinge kyrka
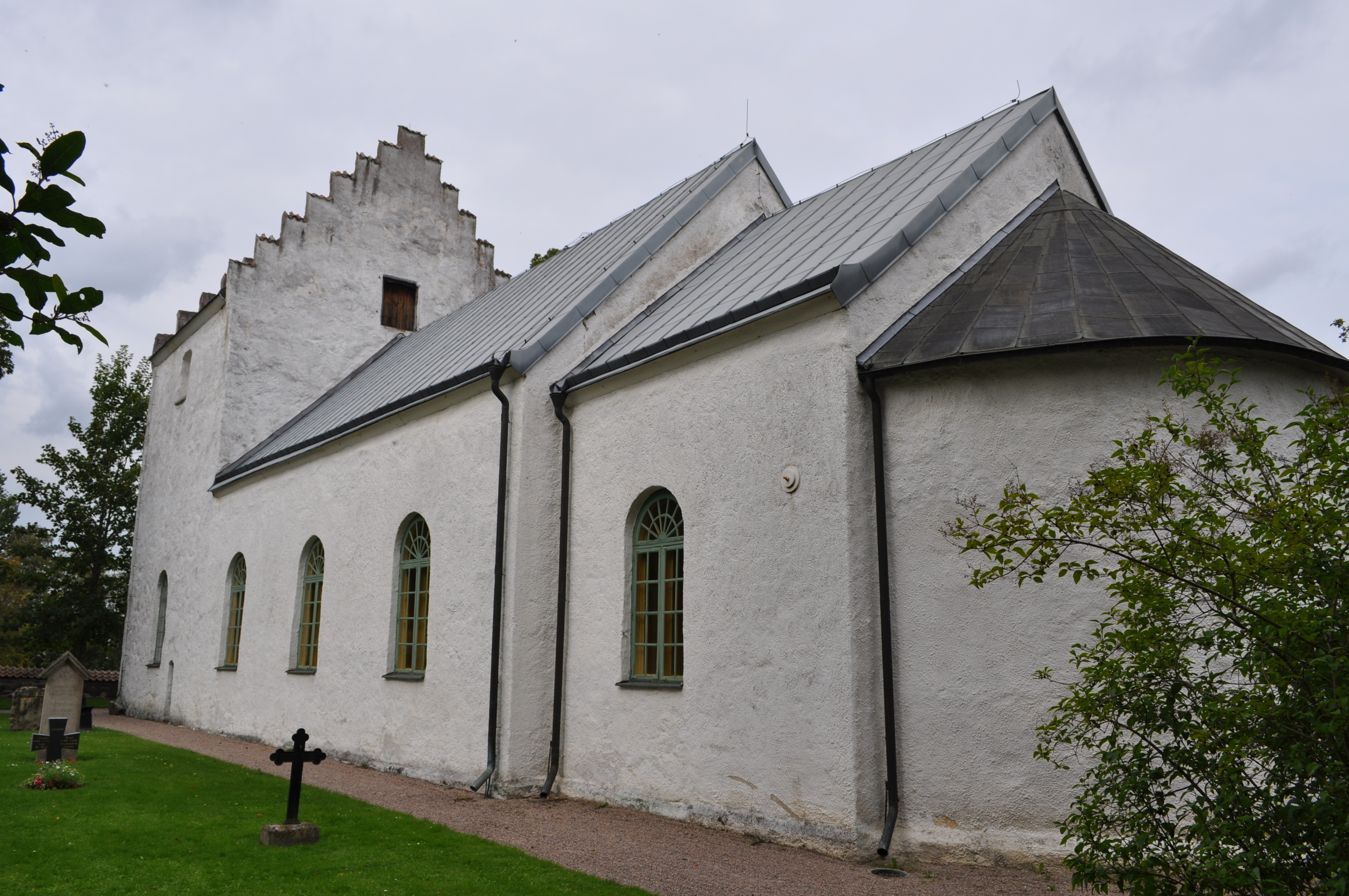
- Kviinge Church

- 56°09′47″N 14°04′56″E
- Country: Sweden
- Denomination: Church of Sweden

Kviinge Church (Swedish: Kviinge kyrka) is a medieval church in Kviinge, Östra Göinge Municipality, in the province of Skåne in Sweden.

== History ==
The church dates from the late 12th century, when the nave, choir and apse were built. The tower was added during the 14th century, and in the 1470s the interior changed and the current vaults built. In 1612 the village Kviinge was burnt by Swedish troops (at the time, Skåne was part of Denmark), but the church was spared. In 1792 the church was enlarged with a transept to the north. The church has been restored on several occasions, and medieval murals have been discovered in both the nave and chancel. One of these, in the apse, has been restored; it depicts the Last Judgment.

Louis Gerhard De Geer, Prime Minister for Justice of Sweden 1858–1870 and 1875–1876, is buried in the cemetery of the church.

== Furnishings ==
The baptismal font is made of sandstone and dates from the 12th century. It is richly sculpted, adorned with scenes from the birth of Christ. The altarpiece dates from 1671 and is also comparatively richly decorated in a Baroque style. The pulpit dates from 1605 and was probably made by Statius Otto.
