= Johan Thyrén =

Swedish jurist and politician (1861–1933)

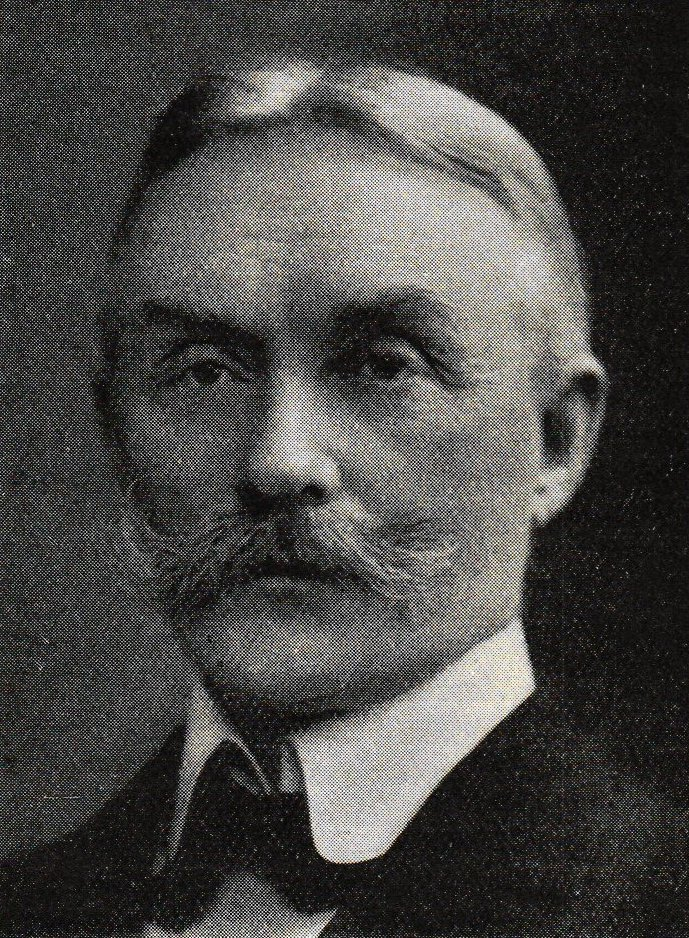

Minister of Justice
- In office 7 June 1926 – 2 October 1928
- Prime Minister: Carl Gustaf Ekman
- Preceded by: Torsten Nothin
- Succeeded by: Georg Bissmark

Personal details
- Born: Johan Carl Wilhelm Thyrén; 6 April 1861
- Died: 4 May 1933 (aged 72)
- Occupation: Academic; Jurist

Johan Thyrén (1861–1933) was a Swedish academic and jurist who was influential in reforming the penal law of Sweden. He served as the vice chancellor of Lund University between 1916 and 1926 and the minister of justice between 1926 and 1928.

== Early life and education ==
Thyrén was born on 6 April 1861. His cousin was Karl Schlyter, a jurist and politician who was one of the justice ministers.

== Career ==
Thyrén worked at Lund University in the period 1894–1926 and was the professor of criminal law. One of his pupils was Östen Undén. Thyrén served as the rector of the university between 1916 and 1926.

Thyrén was an independent member of the parliament where he served from 1909 to 1917. On 7 June 1926 Thyrén was appointed minister of justice to the cabinet led by Premier Carl Gustaf Ekman. His term ended in 1928. From 1932 to 1936 he collaborated with his cousin and minister of justice Karl Schlyter to develop a reform program.

== Work, views and death ==
Thyrén published a book entitled Principles for a Criminal Law Reform (1910–1914) in which he dealt with the pragmatic and sociological dimensions of criminal law aiming at individual prevention. It was written upon the request of the Swedish government which asked him to formulate reforms in the criminal law in 1909.

For Thyrén both punishment and preventive-protective approaches towards the criminal law should be modified, but the latter should be basis of the law. He argued that a new type of protective measure for criminals such as juvenile delinquents, chronic criminals, and alcoholics should be developed. He was instrumental in the termination of the death penalty in 1921 and also, presented the idea of the day-fines system punishing rich and poor equally.

He died on 4 May 1933.
