= Minister for Justice (Sweden) =

Swedish cabinet position

Minister for Justice of Sweden
- Statsråd och chef för Justitiedepartementet
- Lesser coat of arms of Sweden

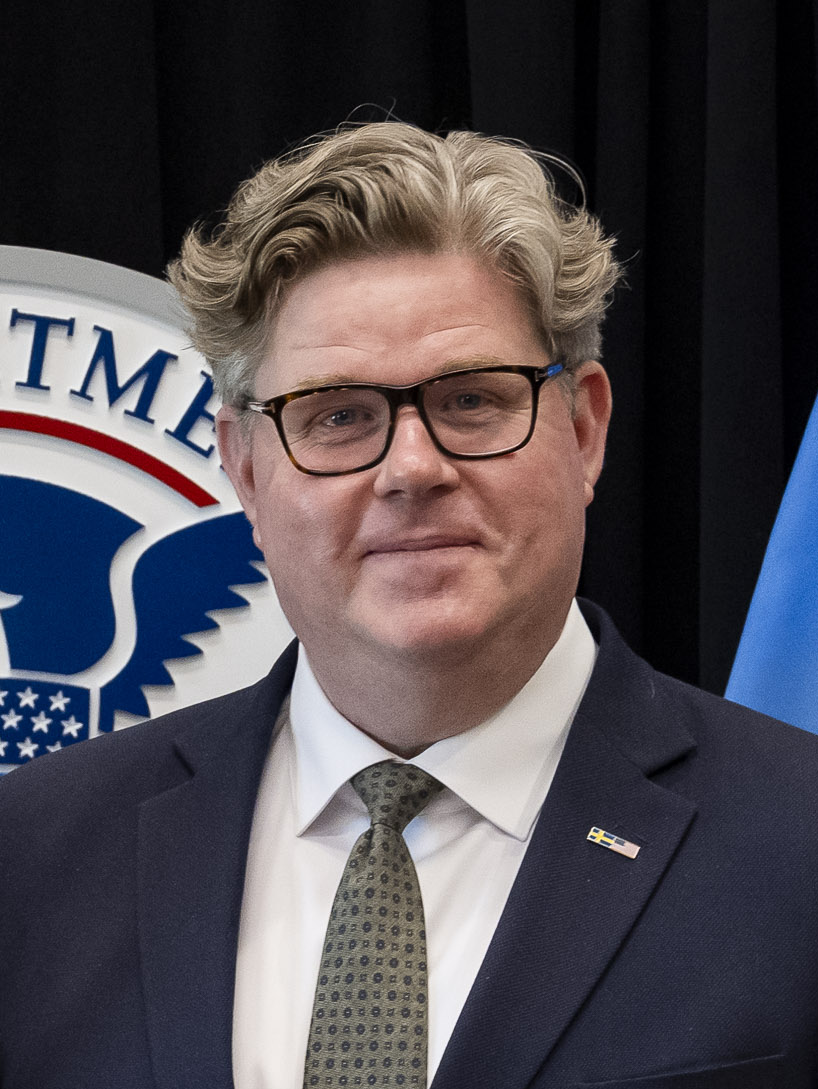
- Incumbent; Gunnar Strömmer since 18 October 2022
- Ministry of Justice
- Member of: Government of Sweden; National Security Council
- Appointer: The Prime Minister
- Term length: No fixed term, Serves at the discretion of the Prime Minister
- Inaugural holder: Louis Gerhard De Geer
- Formation: 20 March 1876
- Website: www.sweden.gov.se/sb/d/584

The Minister for Justice (Swedish: justitieminister), formally cabinet minister and head of the Ministry of Justice, is a member and minister of the Government of Sweden and is appointed by the Prime Minister. The minister is responsible for policies related to combating terrorism, democracy and human rights, family law, the judicial system and the Constitution of Sweden.

The current Minister for Justice is Gunnar Strömmer of the Moderate Party.

== History ==
The office was instituted in 1809 as a result of the constitutional Instrument of Government promulgated in the same year. Until 1876 the office was called Prime Minister for Justice (Swedish: justitiestatsminister), similar to the office of Prime Minister for Foreign Affairs (Swedish: utrikesstatsminister). Until 1840, the Prime Minister for Justice also served as a member of the Supreme Court. Following the ministry reform in 1840, the Prime Minister for Justice became head of the newly instituted Ministry of Justice. In 1876 the office proper of Prime Minister of Sweden was created and at the same time the Minister for Justice was created. Before 1876 the Prime Minister for Justice had in practice been granted exclusively to members of the most prominent noble families.

== List of officeholders ==
=== Prime Ministers for Justice (1809–1876) ===
Name	Took office	Left office	Political party
Carl Axel Wachtmeister	9 June 1809	5 April 1810	Independent
Fredrik Gyllenborg	5 April 1810	18 August 1829	Independent
Mathias Rosenblad	18 August 1829	16 May 1840	Independent
Arvid Mauritz Posse	16 May 1840	5 September 1840	Independent
Carl Petter Törnebladh (acting)	5 September 1840	14 January 1841	Independent
Carl Petter Törnebladh	14 January 1841	5 January 1843	Independent
Lars Herman Gyllenhaal	5 January 1843	28 December 1844	Independent
Johan Nordenfalk	28 December 1844	9 March 1846	Independent
Arvid Mauritz Posse	23 March 1846	10 April 1848	Independent
Gustaf Sparre	10 April 1848	25 September 1856	Independent
Claës Günther	25 September 1856	7 April 1858	Independent
Louis De Geer	7 April 1858	3 June 1870	Independent
Axel Adlercreutz	3 June 1870	8 April 1874	Independent
Edvard Carleson	4 May 1874	11 May 1875	Independent
Louis De Geer	11 May 1875	20 March 1876	Independent

=== Ministers for Justice (1876–present) ===
Color key

Independent
Historical parties: Lantmanna Moderate National Party Liberals Liberals Liberals Liberals
Present parties: Social Democrats Moderate Centre Left Liberals Christian Democrats Green Sweden Democrats

Status

Denotes acting Minister for Justice

Portrait	Minister for Justice (Born-Died)	Term			Political Party	Coalition	Cabinet
Portrait	Minister for Justice (Born-Died)	Took office	Left office	Duration	Political Party	Coalition	Cabinet
Louis De Geer d.ä.	Louis De Geer d.ä. (1818–1896)	20 March 1876	6 June 1879	3 years, 78 days	Independent	–	De Geer d.ä. Cabinet
Ludvig Teodor Almqvist	Ludvig Teodor Almqvist (1818–1884)	6 June 1879	19 April 1880	318 days	Independent	–	De Geer d.ä. Cabinet
Nils von Steyern	Nils von Steyern (1839–1899)	19 April 1880	6 February 1888	7 years, 293 days	Independent	–	Posse Cabinet; Thyselius Cabinet; Themptander Cabinet
Axel Bergström	Axel Bergström (1823–1893)	6 February 1888	28 September 1888	235 days	Independent	–	Gillis Bildt Cabinet
Axel Örbom	Axel Örbom (1836–1889)	28 September 1888	30 May 1889	244 days	Independent	–	Gillis Bildt Cabinet
August Östergren	August Östergren (1832–1914)	12 June 1889	5 February 1896	6 years, 238 days	Independent	–	Åkerhielm Cabinet; Boström I Cabinet
Ludvig Annerstedt	Ludvig Annerstedt (1836–1904)	5 February 1896	5 December 1901	5 years, 303 days	Independent	–	Von Otter Cabinet
Hjalmar Hammarskjöld	Hjalmar Hammarskjöld (1862–1953)	5 December 1901	5 July 1902	212 days	Independent	–	Von Otter Cabinet
Ossian Berger	Ossian Berger (1849–1914)	5 July 1902	2 August 1905	3 years, 28 days	Lantmanna	–	Boström II Cabinet; Ramstedt Cabinet
Gustaf Berg	Gustaf Berg (1844–1908)	2 August 1905	7 November 1905	97 days	Moderate	M–L	Lundeberg Cabinet
Karl Staaff	Karl Staaff (1860–1915)	7 November 1905	29 May 1906	203 days	Liberals	L	Staaff I Cabinet
Gustaf Albert Petersson	Gustaf Albert Petersson (1851–1938)	29 May 1906	7 October 1911	5 years, 131 days	Electoral League	Electoral League	Lindman I Cabinet
Gustaf Sandström	Gustaf Sandström (1865–1930)	7 October 1911	17 February 1914	2 years, 133 days	Liberals	L	Staaff II Cabinet
Berndt Hasselrot	Berndt Hasselrot (1862–1930)	17 February 1914	30 March 1917	3 years, 41 days	Independent	–	Hammarskjöld Cabinet
Steno Stenberg	Steno Stenberg (1870–1940)	30 March 1917	19 October 1917	203 days	Electoral League	National Party	Swartz Cabinet
Eliel Löfgren	Eliel Löfgren (1872–1940)	19 October 1917	10 March 1920	2 years, 143 days	Liberals	L–S	Edén Cabinet
Östen Undén	Östen Undén (1886–1974)	10 March 1920	30 June 1920	112 days	Social Democrats	S	Branting I Cabinet
Assar Åkerman	Assar Åkerman (1860–1936)	30 June 1920	27 October 1920	119 days	Social Democrats	S	Branting I Cabinet
Birger Ekeberg	Birger Ekeberg (1880–1968)	27 October 1920	13 October 1921	351 days	Independent	–	De Geer Cabinet; Von Sydow Cabinet
Assar Åkerman	Assar Åkerman (1860–1936)	13 October 1921	19 April 1923	1 year, 188 days	Social Democrats	S	Branting II Cabinet
Birger Ekeberg	Birger Ekeberg (1880–1968)	19 April 1923	18 October 1924	1 year, 182 days	Independent	National Party	Trygger Cabinet
Torsten Nothin	Torsten Nothin (1884–1972)	18 October 1924	7 June 1926	1 year, 232 days	Social Democrats	S	Branting III Cabinet; Sandler Cabinet
Johan Thyrén	Johan Thyrén (1861–1933)	7 June 1926	2 October 1928	2 years, 117 days	Liberals	L–L	Ekman I Cabinet
Georg Bissmark	Georg Bissmark (1871–1941)	2 October 1928	7 June 1930	1 year, 248 days	National Party	Electoral League	Lindman II Cabinet
Natanael Gärde	Natanael Gärde (1880–1968)	7 June 1930	24 September 1932	2 years, 109 days	Independent	L	Ekman II Cabinet; Hamrin Cabinet
Karl Schlyter	Karl Schlyter (1879–1959)	24 September 1932	19 June 1936	3 years, 269 days	Social Democrats	S	Hansson I Cabinet
Thorwald Bergquist	Thorwald Bergquist (1899–1972)	19 June 1936	28 September 1936	101 days	Independent	C	Pehrsson-Bramstorp Cabinet
Karl Gustaf Westman	Karl Gustaf Westman (1876–1944)	28 September 1936	30 August 1943	6 years, 336 days	Centre	S–C; S–C–M–L	Hansson II Cabinet; Hansson III Cabinet
Thorwald Bergquist	Thorwald Bergquist (1899–1972)	30 August 1943	31 July 1945	1 year, 335 days	Liberals	S–C–M–L	Hansson III Cabinet
Herman Zetterberg	Herman Zetterberg (1904–1963)	31 July 1945	20 September 1957	12 years, 51 days	Social Democrats	S–C–M–L; S S–C	Hansson IV Cabinet; Erlander I Cabinet; Erlander II Cabinet
Ingvar Lindell	Ingvar Lindell (1904–1993)	20 September 1957	1 December 1959	2 years, 72 days	Social Democrats	S–C; S	Erlander II Cabinet; Erlander III Cabinet
Herman Kling	Herman Kling (1913–1985)	1 December 1959	14 October 1969	9 years, 317 days	Social Democrats	S	Erlander III Cabinet
Lennart Geijer	Lennart Geijer (1909–1999)	14 October 1969	8 October 1976	6 years, 360 days	Social Democrats	S	Palme I Cabinet
Sven Romanus	Sven Romanus (1906–2005)	8 October 1976	12 October 1979	3 years, 4 days	Independent	C–M–L; L	Fälldin I Cabinet; Ullsten Cabinet
Håkan Winberg	Håkan Winberg (1931–2022)	12 October 1979	5 May 1981	1 year, 205 days	Moderate	C–M–L	Fälldin II Cabinet
Carl Axel Petri	Carl Axel Petri (1929–2017)	5 May 1981	8 October 1982	1 year, 156 days	Independent	C–L	Fälldin III Cabinet
Ove Rainer	Ove Rainer (1925–1987)	8 October 1982	10 November 1983	1 year, 33 days	Social Democrats	S	Palme II Cabinet
Anna-Greta Leijon	Anna-Greta Leijon (1939–2024); Acting	11 November 1983	15 November 1983	5 days	Social Democrats	S	Palme II Cabinet
Sten Wickbom	Sten Wickbom (1931–2015)	15 November 1983	19 October 1987	3 years, 338 days	Social Democrats	S	Palme II Cabinet; Carlsson I Cabinet
Anna-Greta Leijon	Anna-Greta Leijon (1939–2024)	19 October 1987	7 July 1988	232 days	Social Democrats	S	Carlsson I Cabinet
Thage G. Peterson	Thage G. Peterson (born 1933); Acting	7 July 1988	30 September 1988	115 days	Social Democrats	S	Carlsson I Cabinet
Ingvar Carlsson	Ingvar Carlsson (born 1934); Acting	30 September 1988	4 October 1988	4 days	Social Democrats	S	Carlsson I Cabinet
Laila Freivalds	Laila Freivalds (born 1942)	4 October 1988	4 October 1991	3 years, 0 days	Social Democrats	S	Carlsson I Cabinet; Carlsson II Cabinet
Gun Hellsvik	Gun Hellsvik (1942–2016)	4 October 1991	7 October 1994	3 years, 3 days	Moderate	M–C–L–KD	Bildt Cabinet
Laila Freivalds	Laila Freivalds (born 1942)	7 October 1994	21 September 2000	5 years, 350 days	Social Democrats	S	Carlsson III Cabinet; Persson Cabinet
Lena Hjelm-Wallén	Lena Hjelm-Wallén (born 1943); Acting	21 September 2000	16 October 2000	25 days	Social Democrats	S	Persson Cabinet
Thomas Bodström	Thomas Bodström (born 1962)	16 October 2000	6 October 2006	5 years, 355 days	Social Democrats	S	Persson Cabinet
Beatrice Ask	Beatrice Ask (born 1956)	6 October 2006	3 October 2014	7 years, 362 days	Moderate	M–C–L–KD	Reinfeldt Cabinet
Morgan Johansson	Morgan Johansson (born 1970)	3 October 2014	18 October 2022	8 years, 15 days	Social Democrats	S–MP	Löfven I Cabinet; Löfven II Cabinet; Löfven III Cabinet; Andersson Cabinet
Gunnar Strömmer	Gunnar Strömmer (born 1972)	18 October 2022		3 years, 324 days	Moderate	M–KD–L	Kristersson Cabinet

- According to the data above, Anna-Greta Leijon was the first female appointed as the Minister for Justice (1983). However, Laila Freivalds was the first female with a legal credential to become the Minister for Justice (1988–1991; 1994–2000)--as Leijon had a labor background.

== See also ==
- Instrument of Government (1809)
- Justice ministry
- Politics of Sweden
