= Ingrid Gärde Widemar =

Swedish lawyer and politician (1912–2009)

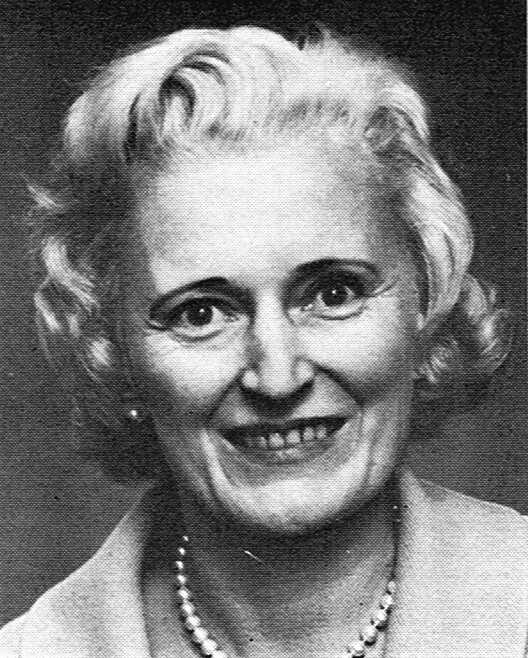
Ingrid Gärde Widemar

Ingrid Gärde Widemar (1912–2009) was a Swedish lawyer and politician (Liberal People's Party (Sweden)). She was the first female Supreme Court Justice in Sweden.

== Biography ==
Gärde was born on 24 March 1912. Her father was Natanael Gärde, a judge and a politician. She was a lawyer with her own practice since 1945. She was MP for Stockholm in the Lower Chamber 1949–52, Upper Chamber 1954–60, and Lower Chamber 1961–68. She was the first Supreme Court Justice of her gender in Sweden 1968–1977.

She got married Sven Widemar, a lawyer, in 1938, and they had four children together. She died on 2 January 2009.

== Sources ==
- Tvåkammarriksdagen 1867–1970, band 1 (Almqvist & Wiksell International 1988)
