= Ossian Berger =

Swedish lawyer and politician (1849–1914)

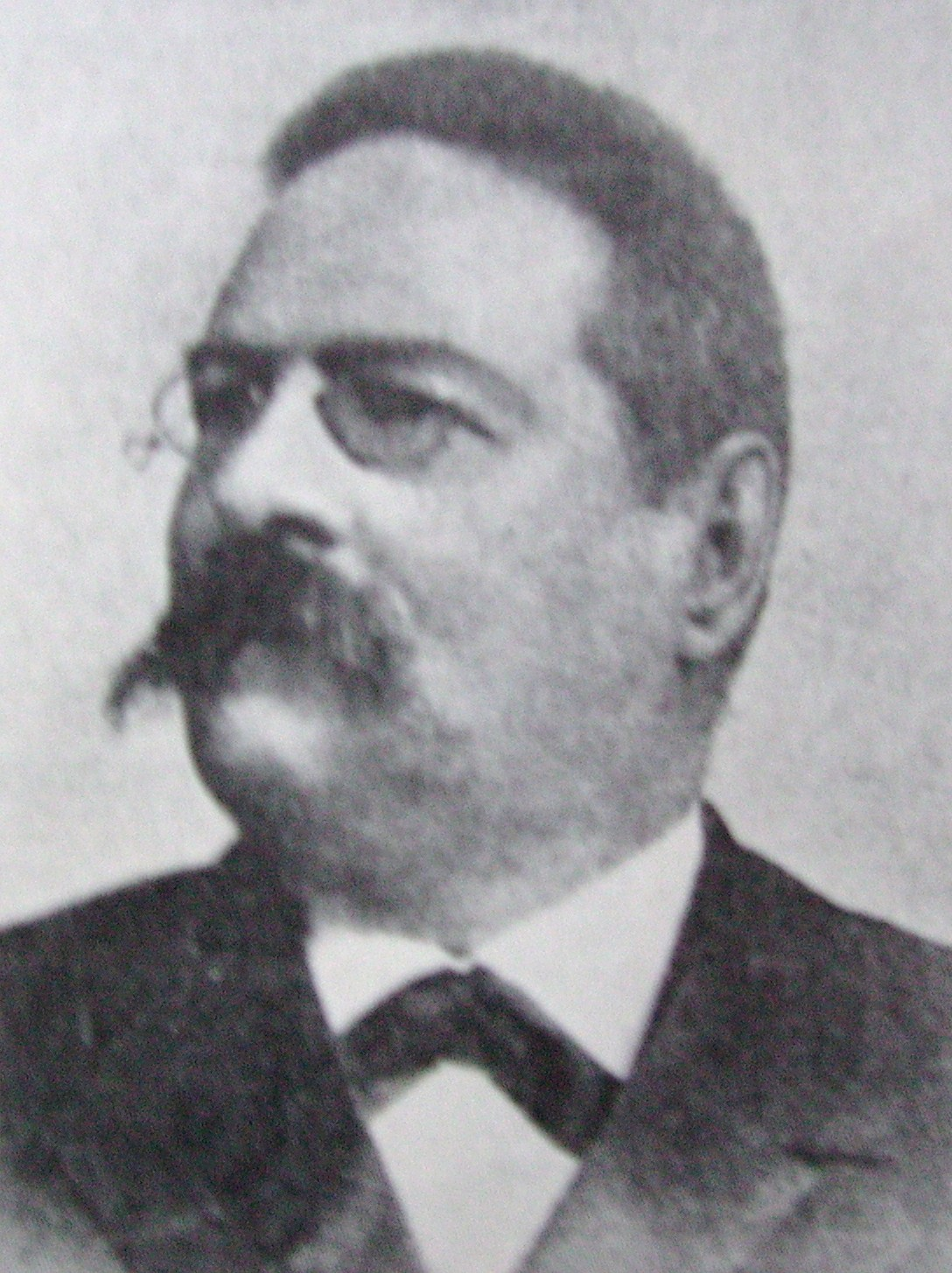

Minister of Justice
- In office 1902–1905
- Preceded by: Hjalmar Hammarskjöld
- Succeeded by: Gustaf Berg

Personal details
- Born: February 13, 1849 Nysund parish, Örebro county, Sweden
- Died: 28 December 1914 (aged 65) Uppsala County, Sweden
- Party: Lantmanna Party
- Education: Uppsala University

Ossian Berger (13 February 1849 – 28 December 1914) was a Swedish politician and lawyer. He was the minister of justice from 1902 to 1905 and member of the Riksdag (parliament) from 1907 to 1912.

== Early life and education ==
Berger was born in Nysund parish, Örebro County, on 13 February 1849. He was the son of Anders Berger – a member of the burghers in the Riksdag of the Estates and a member of the lower house (Andra kammaren) of the Riksdag – and Marie Charlotte Löwenhielm. His brothers were mathematician Alexander Berger and journalist Vilhelm Berger. He graduated from Uppsala University, receiving a bachelor's degree in law, doctorate in philosophy, and doctorate in law.

== Career ==
After graduating, he then worked in the Scania and Blekinge Court of Appeal and then as chief justice of Åsbo Northern Hundred from 1892 to 1898. From 1898 to 1902 he was the parliamentary ombudsman, after which he became minister of justice from 1902 to 1905 in Erik Gustaf Boström's second cabinet. During his tenure several bills were presented on the arrangement of literary property. In 1904 he presented a bill that would make the state obliged to provide assistance to the detainees if they requested. However, his proposal was not endorsed by the Riksdag. On 2 August 1905 he resigned from the office.

After retiring from politics he continued to work in different legal posts: he returned to his post in Norra Åsbo for a year, before being elected as substitute to the ombudsman in 1906–1907 and from 1908 to 1913, and was again elected as ombudsman in 1913 until his death in 1914. In addition, he was a member of the Riksdag's upper house (Första kammaren) from 1907 to 1912, from 1907 to 1911 for Kalmar County's southern constituency and in 1912 for Örebro County's constituency. He was non-partisan in 1907, belonged to the upper house's moderate party from 1908 to 1911 and finally described himself as liberal but politically unaffiliated in 1912.

As ombudsman, Berger proposed improvements to laws, law school textbooks, the judiciary and civil rights such as freedom of assembly as well as focusing on the efficiency of the court system. During his time as minister of justice, he was liberal but pro-defense. He pushed for Sweden's accession to the Berne Convention, and had the controversial voting rights issue on his table, but was unable to push for universal and equal voting rights for men in elections to the second chamber because the liberals opposed proportionality.

== Personal life and death ==
Berger did not get married. He died in Uppsala County on 28 December 1914 and is buried in Gråmanstorp cemetery.
