= Axel Örbom =

Carl Gustaf Axel Örbom
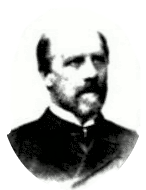

Swedish Prime Minister for Justice
- In office 1889–1889

Personal details
- Born: July 29, 1836 Stockholm, Stockholm County
- Died: May 30, 1889 (aged 52) Stockholm, Stockholm County
- Parent(s): Johan Axel Örbom (1800–1868) and Anna Karolina Westman

Carl Gustaf Axel Örbom (29 July 1836 – 30 May 1889), was a Swedish jurist and government figure who, in the final eight months of his life, served as the Minister for Justice.

== Biography ==
A native of Stockholm he was the son of Johan Axel Örbom (1800–1868) and Anna Karolina Westman. Following studies at Uppsala University (1854–1858), he embarked on a career in law, becoming, in 1870, an assessor in Stockholm's Svea Court of Appeal and, the following year, joining the legal staff of Ministry of Justice. In 1884 he was appointed Justitieråd, the title carried by a justice of the Supreme Court of Sweden. On 28 September 1888, he took over as the new Minister for Justice. His eight months in office carried a heavy workload, including cases dealing with sedition and agitation, which brought him criticism from opposition Socialists in Riksdag, the National Parliament.

Axel Örbom died in Stockholm at age 52.

Preceded by Axel Bergström	Minister for Justice (Sweden); 1888–1889	Succeeded by August Östergren
