= Hjalmar Kinberg =

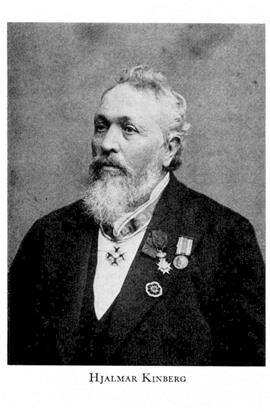
- Born: 13 May 1820; Grönby, Sweden
- Died: 29 August 1908 (aged 88); Stockholm, Sweden
- Citizenship: Swedish
- Education: University of Lund
- Scientific career
- Fields: veterinarian, zoologist, physician
- Workplaces: Karolinska Institute
- Author abbrev. (zoology): Kinberg

Johan Gustaf Hjalmar Kinberg (13 May 1820 – 29 August 1908) was a Swedish zoologist, physician and veterinarian who was born in Grönby, near Trelleborg, Skåne County and who died in St. Matthew's Parish, Stockholm.

== Family ==
Hjalmar Kinberg's father Henrik Kinberg was a rural dean, as was his grandfather, Johan Gustaf Kinberg. His mother, Margareta Lovisa Schlyter, was the sister of Professor Carl Johan Schlyter, a noted Swedish lawyer and academic. Kinberg married twice, first, in 1854, to Helena Stockenberg (1831–1858). After the death of his first wife, he married again in 1859 to Aurore Hammarskjöld. He had two children: Arvid Gustaf Kinberg who was born in 1860 and Gottfrid Hilding Kinberg who was born in 1874. He is the great-great-grandfather of Anna Kinberg Batra, a Swedish politician who was Leader of the Moderate Party and Leader of the Opposition in Sweden.

== Career ==
Kinberg enrolled at the University of Lund in 1838 and graduated with a degree in natural sciences in 1844, then a Master of Philosophy degree in 1848 before completing his medical doctor's degree in 1850. He subsequently worked as a doctor including a spell as an assistant physician at the Danish army in Schleswig in 1850 before he was posted to His Swedish Majesty's Frigate Eugenie as the ship's surgeon and zoologist on its circumnavigation of the world in 1851–1853. On his return he was appointed prosector and anatomy lecturer at the Karolinska Institute. From 1854 he was appointed temporary professor at the Veterinärinrättningen i Skara (which became the Swedish Veterinary Institute in 1867), becoming an acting professor from 1856 and full professor from 1859 until 1888. He also acted as a director there 1856 to 1862 and 1872–1886. He was a founding member of the Swedish Veterinary Association and its first chairman.

Kinberg submitted an award-winning zoological thesis to the University of Uppsala in 1863, Synopsis suturarum et epiphysium. He also published a number of papers on new species of Annelida collected on the Eugenie expedition between 1865 and 1867 which were reissued posthumously in Uppsala as a single volume published in 1910. He also published papers in Swedish on veterinary medicine in 1863 and 1872, the skeletal anatomy of mammals in 1869 and the dentition of pigs in 1875. He also worked on Svenska foglarna, a book on Swedish ornithology, with Peter Åkerlund and Carl Jacob Sundevall which was published between 1856 and 1886 and he was the author of the 1880 Eddas Naturhistoria.
