= Karl Schlyter =

Swedish jurist and politician (1879–1959)

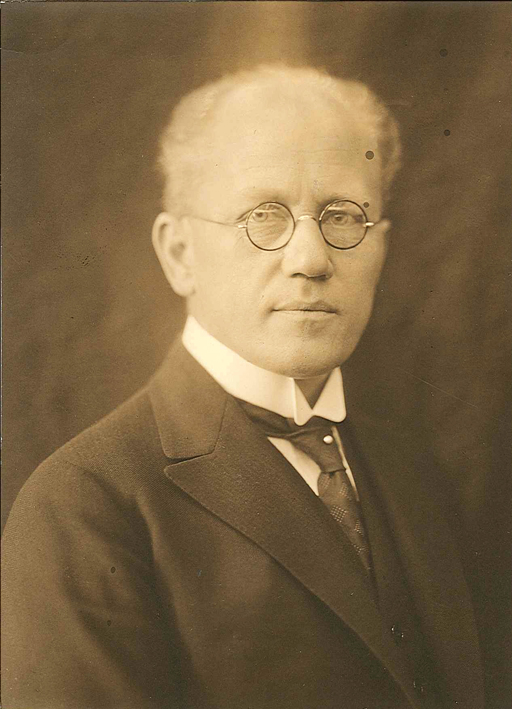

Minister of Justice
- In office 1932–1936
- Prime Minister: Per Albin Hansson
- Succeeded by: Thorwald Bergquist

Personal details
- Born: Karl Johan Schlyter; 21 December 1879 Karlskrona, Sweden
- Died: 25 December 1959 (aged 80) Stockholm, Sweden
- Party: Social Democratic Party
- Spouse: Sigrid Elisabeth Scholander
- Parents: Gustaf Ragnar Schlyter (father); Augusta Elisabeth Cederberg (mother)
- Education: Lund University
- Occupation: Lawyer

Karl Schlyter (21 December 1879 – 25 December 1959) was a Swedish lawyer. He also served as the minister of justice in the period 1932–1936. He is known for his contributions in the revisions of the procedural part of the Code of 1734 and in the formulation of a new penal law in replacement of the Penal Law of 1864.

== Early life and education ==
Schlyter was born in Karlskrona on 21 December 1879. His parents were Gustaf Ragnar Schlyter, a senior lecturer, and Augusta Elisabeth Cederberg. His grandfather was Carl Johan Schlyter who was the first professor of legal history in the law faculty of Lund University.

Schlyter studied Romance and Nordic languages and philosophy at Lund University. He later changed his study subject and received a degree in law from the same university.

== Career ==
Following his graduation, Schlyter worked at different legal institutions. He joined the Social Democratic Party in 1906. In 1911 he was appointed secretary of the commission for the reform of procedural law and worked there for 15 years. He served as the minister without portfolio in the periods 1921–1923 and 1925–1926 in the social democratic governments. He was also a member of the upper house of the Parliament for the Social Democratic Party. Between 1932 and 1936 Schlyter was minister of justice in a social democratic government led by Prime Minister Per Albin Hansson. Upon his appointment Schlyter began to involve in reform activities to radically alter the legal system of Sweden.

Between 1937 and 1947 Schlyter headed the first legal committee of the parliament. He also served as the chairman of the court of appeals. Schlyter was the editor of a Swedish legal journal entitled Svensk Juristtidning from its start in 1916 to the late 1940s.

== Personal life and death ==
Schlyter married Sigrid Elisabeth Scholander in Lund on 6 June 1905. He was the cousin of Johan Thyrén who also served as the minister of justice.

Schlyter died on 25 December 1959.
