= Axel Vennersten =

Swedish politician

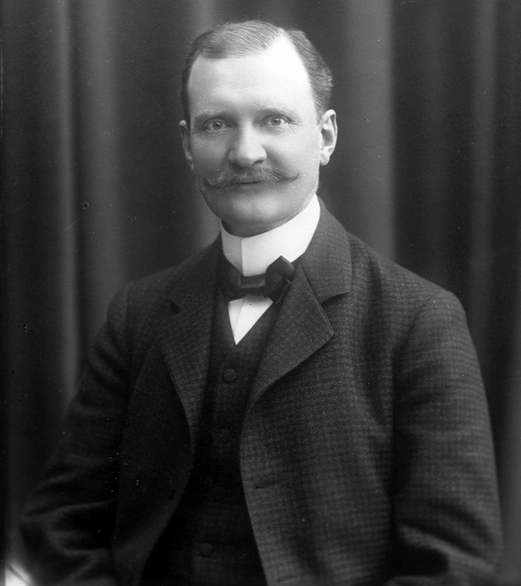
Axel Vennersten in 1913.

Axel Vennersten (20 January 1863 – 22 March 1948) was a Swedish politician and the ninth Speaker of Första kammaren of the Riksdag.

He was Minister for Finance from February 1914 to March 1917.

Government offices
Preceded by Theodor Adelswärd	Minister for Finance; 1914–1917	Succeeded by Conrad Carleson
Court offices
Preceded by Oscar von Sydow	Marshal of the Realm; 1936–1946	Succeeded by Birger Ekeberg
