= Assar Åkerman =

Swedish jurist and politician

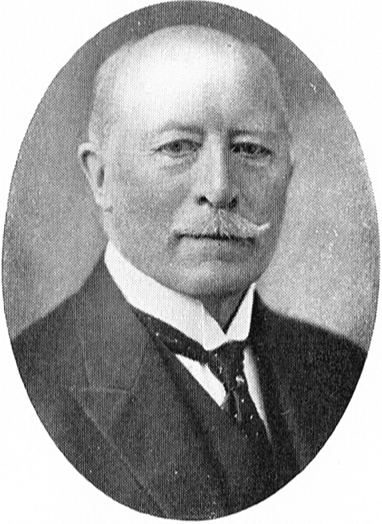
- Assar Åkerman
- Born: 28 October 1860
- Died: 7 October 1936 (aged 75)
- Occupations: Jurist and politician

Assar Åkerman (28 October 1860 – 7 October 1936) was a Swedish jurist and Social Democratic politician.

He served as Minister for Justice in 1920, and from 1921 to 1923.

Political offices
Preceded by Östen Undén	Minister for Justice; 1920-1920	Succeeded by Birger Ekeberg
Preceded by Birger Ekeberg	Minister for Justice; 1921-1923	Succeeded by Birger Ekeberg
