= Oscar von Sydow =

Swedish politician (1873–1936)

His Excellency Oscar von Sydow
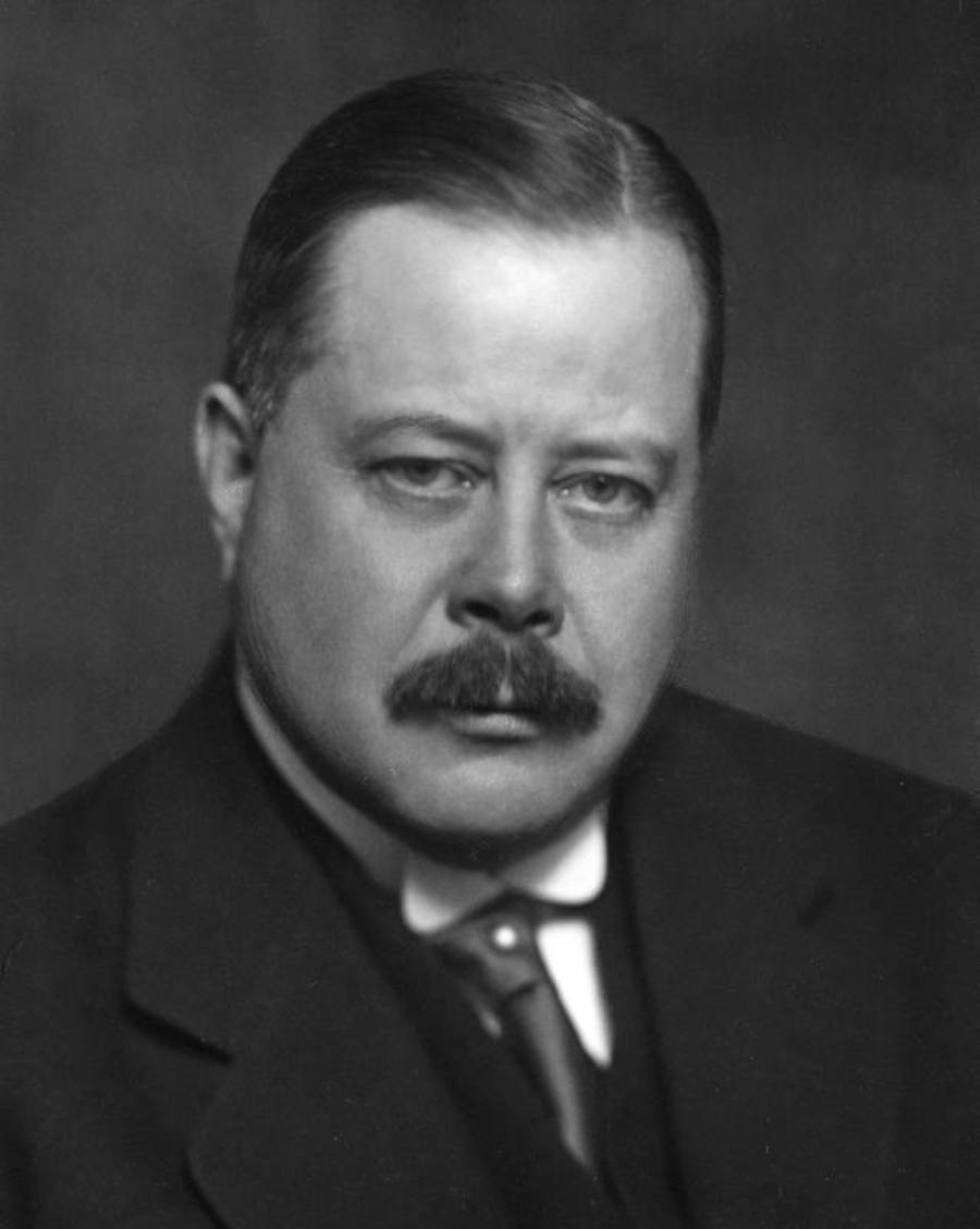
- von Sydow, c. 1921

Prime Minister of Sweden
- In office 23 February 1921 – 13 October 1921
- Monarch: Gustaf V
- Preceded by: Gerhard Louis De Geer
- Succeeded by: Hjalmar Branting

Marshal of the Realm
- In office 27 April 1934 – 19 August 1936
- Monarch: Gustaf V
- Preceded by: Eric Trolle
- Succeeded by: Axel Vennersten

Personal details
- Born: Oscar Fredrik von Sydow; 12 July 1873 Kalmar, Sweden
- Died: 19 August 1936 (aged 63) Ekerö, Sweden
- Resting place: Östra kyrkogården
- Party: Independent
- Spouse: Mary Emily Wijk (m. 1911)
- Children: 3, including Erik von Sydow
- Education: Uppsala University

Oscar Fredrik von Sydow (12 July 1873 – 19 August 1936) was a Swedish politician who served briefly as Prime Minister of Sweden from 23 February to 13 October 1921. He is the most recent independent to occupy the post.

== Biography ==
Oscar von Sydow was the son of Henrik August von Sydow, a magistrate's clerk, and Euphrosyne Maria Modin. He was born in Kalmar and raised in Norrland. In 1890, he passed his higher education examination and proceeded to study Law at Uppsala University. In 1894, he graduated with a degree in the civil service.

In 1906, von Sydow was appointed Undersecretary of State at the Ministry for Civil Service Affairs, and in 1911 he became the Governor of Norrbotten County. In the governments of Hjalmar Hammarskjöld and Carl Swartz (1914–1917) he was Minister for Civil Service Affairs, during which time he established the Unemployment Commission (arbetslöshetskommissionen). Between 1917 and 1934, he was Governor of Gothenburg and Bohus County.

Following the sudden resignation of the Prime Minister Louis De Geer in 1921, the King had difficulties finding a candidate willing to form a new government, as the elections were drawing near. Hjalmar Branting declined, after being asked twice to become Prime Minister, and the appointment was offered to Oscar von Sydow, who accepted and took office on 23 February.

Von Sydow gave an ultimatum that he would not lead a powerless government and demanded that the Social Democratic Party promise to support him in important finance and defence issues. Despite such agreements, all of the propositions made by the new government were voted down by the opposition, and as a result von Sydow resigned on 13 October 1921. His lasting legacy as Prime Minister is for presenting the bill that abolished the death penalty in Sweden.

Von Sydow was Marshal of the Realm (riksmarskalk) from 1934 until his death in 1936.

== See also ==
- Sydow (surname)

Political offices
| Preceded by Gerhard Louis De Geer | Prime Minister of Sweden; February–October 1921 | Succeeded by Hjalmar Branting |
