= Louis Gerhard De Geer =

First Prime Minister of Sweden (1818–1896)

His Excellency The High Well-born Baron Louis Gerard De Geer
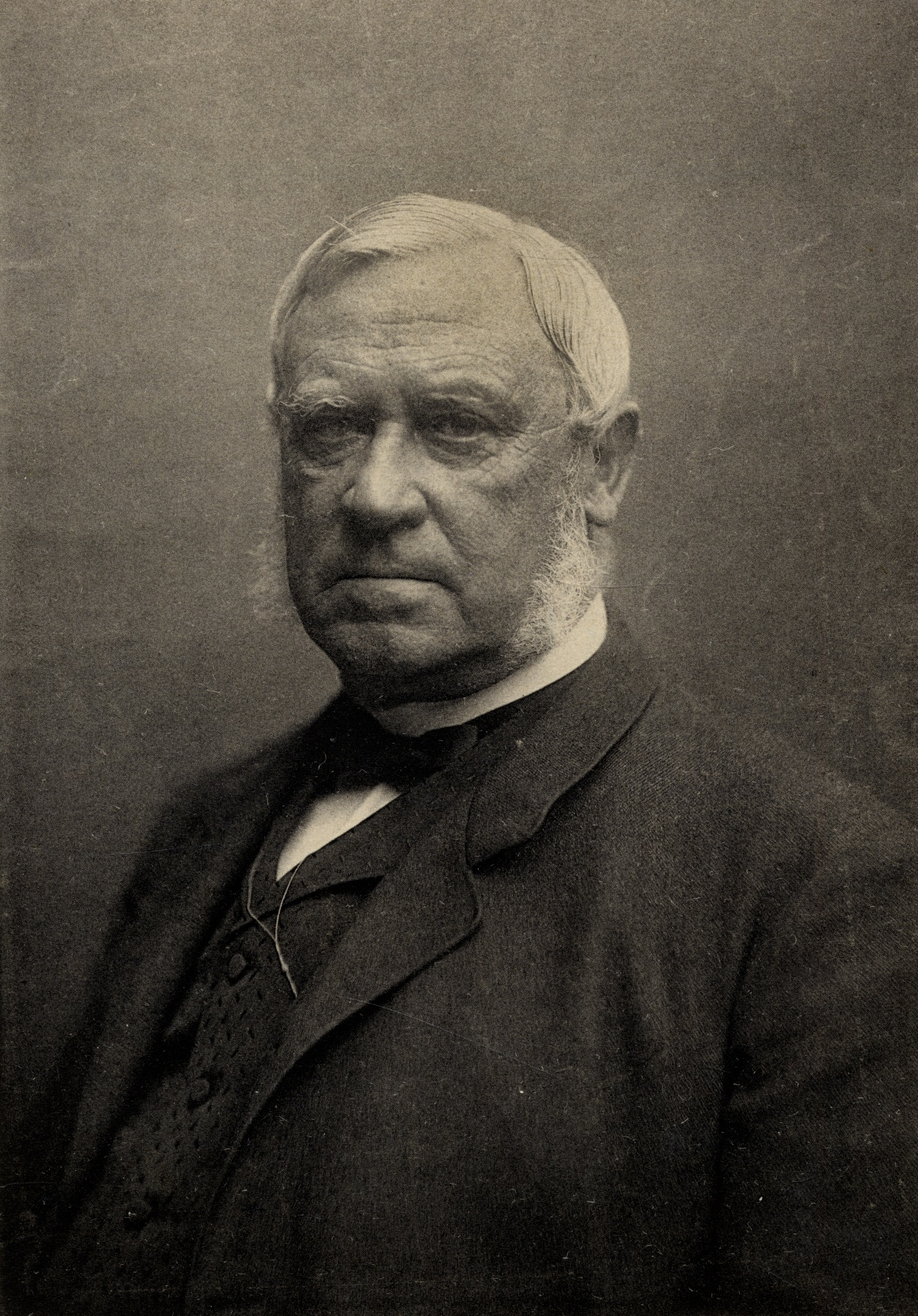

Prime Minister of Sweden
- In office 20 March 1876 – 19 April 1880
- Monarch: Oscar II
- Preceded by: Office established
- Succeeded by: Arvid Posse

Minister for Justice
- In office 20 March 1876 – 6 June 1879
- Preceded by: Office established
- Succeeded by: Ludvig Teodor Almqvist

Prime Minister for Justice
- In office 11 May 1875 – 20 March 1876
- Preceded by: Edvard Carleson
- Succeeded by: Himself (as both Prime Minister and Minister for Justice)
- In office 7 April 1858 – 3 June 1870
- Preceded by: Claës Günther
- Succeeded by: Axel Adlercreutz

Personal details
- Born: Louis Gerard De Geer af Finspång; 18 July 1818 Finspång Castle, Sweden
- Died: 24 September 1896 (aged 78) Hanaskog Castle, Sweden
- Party: Independent liberal
- Spouse: Caroline Wachtmeister
- Children: 6
- Parent(s): Gerard De Geer; Henriette Charlotte Lagerstråle
- Education: Linköpings Gymnasium
- Alma mater: Uppsala universitet
- Occupation: Politician • lawyer

Baron Louis Gerard De Geer af Finspång (18 July 1818 – 24 September 1896) was a Swedish statesman, lawyer, and writer who served twice as Prime Minister for Justice from 1858 to 1870 and from 1875 to 1876; in 1876, he became the first Prime Minister of Sweden, serving until 1880. De Geer was the principal architect of the 1863–66 representation reform, replacing the Riksdag of the Estates with a bicameral parliament and playing a pivotal role in modernizing Swedish politics.

== Biography ==
De Geer was born at Finspång Castle in Risinge parish, and was a member of the De Geer family. He was a lawyer, and in 1855 became president of the Göta Court of Appeal, or lord justice for the appellate court of Götaland. From 7 April 1858 to 3 June 1870 he was Prime Minister for Justice and again from 11 May 1875 to 20 March 1876. As a member of the nobility, he took part in the Swedish Riksdag of the Estates from 1851 onwards. From 1867 to 1878 he was the member for Stockholm in the first chamber in the New Riksdag, where he introduced and passed many useful reforms.

According to his Minnen ("Memoirs") he considered himself a Liberal, in sympathy with universal suffrage. He never tried, however, to introduce legislation which he deemed impossible to get through the Riksdag.

=== Architect of the New Riksdag ===
De Geer's greatest political achievement was the reform of the Swedish representative system. The reforms introduced a bi-cameral elected Riksdag replacing the existing cumbersome and less democratic Riksdag of the Estates, a hangover from the later Medieval period. This measure was accepted by the Riksdag in December 1865, and received the royal sanction on 22 June 1866. For some time after this De Geer enjoyed considerable popularity. He retired from the ministry in 1870, but took office again, as Prime Minister of Justice in 1875.

=== First Prime Minister ===
In 1876 De Geer became the first Prime Minister of Sweden following a reform where the previous offices of Prime Minister for Justice (which he held at the time) and Prime Minister for Foreign Affairs were changed into Minister for Justice and a Minister for Foreign Affairs. He served until April 1880, when the failure of his repeated efforts to settle the armaments issue again induced him to resign. From 1881 to 1888 he was Chancellor for the Universities of Uppsala and Lund. He was an advocate of free trade and economic liberalism. Some argue that it was De Geer who laid the foundations for the strong economic growth in Sweden from 1870 to 1970.

== Literary works ==
Besides several novels and aesthetic essays, De Geer wrote a few political memoirs of supreme merit both as to style and matter, the most notable of which are Minnesteckning öfver A. J. v. Höpken (Stockholm, 1881); Minnesteckning öfver Hans Järta (Stockholm, 1874); Minnesteckning öfver B. B. von Platen (Stockholm, 1886); and his own Minnen (Stockholm, 1892), an autobiography, invaluable as a historical document, in which the political experience and the matured judgments of a lifetime are recorded with singular clearness, sobriety and charm. For example, his explanation of why he, at such a young age, was appointed Prime Minister of Justice, was that in the narrow circles of Swedish nobility at the time, it was difficult to find anyone with at least the mediocre intelligence which was needed for the office.

== Membership in academies ==
De Geer was a member in the Swedish Academy from 1862, on Seat 17. In 1862, he was also elected a member of the Royal Swedish Academy of Sciences.

== Personal life ==
In 1848, De Geer married the countess Carolina Lovisa Wachtmeister. They had three sons, of which the eldest, Gerhard Louis De Geer (1854–1935), was prime minister of Sweden from 1920 to 21 and the second was Gerard De Geer (1858–1943), a geologist.

== Death ==
De Geer died on 24 September 1896 at his residence Hanaskog Castle in Scania. He is buried in the cemetery of Kviinge Church.

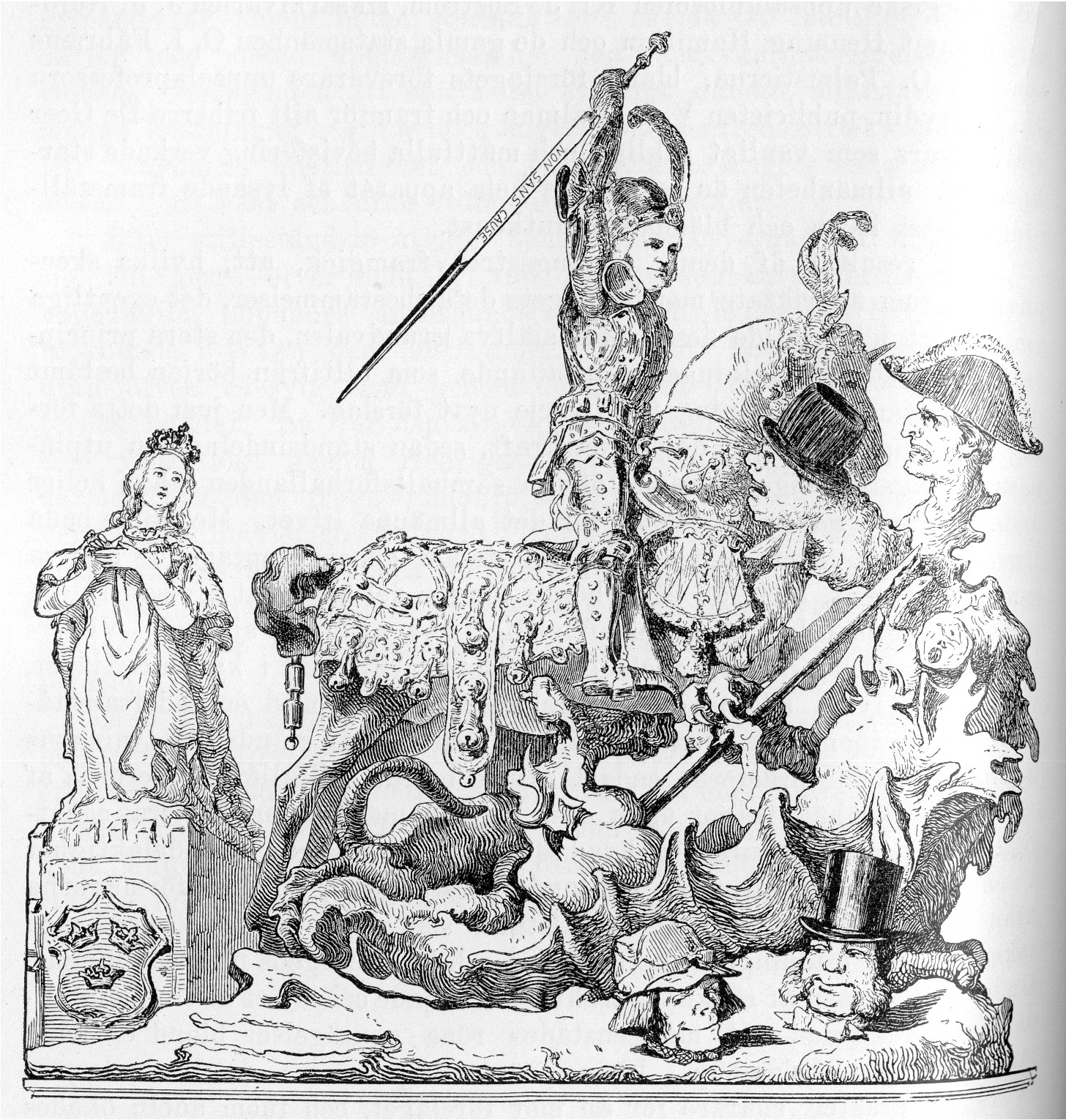
De Geer in a contemporary newspaper caricature, depicted as St George fighting the four-headed dragon of the old four-chamber Riksdag of the Estates. From Emil Hildebrand, Sveriges historia intill tjugonde seklet (1910).

Political offices
Preceded by Office established	Prime Minister of Sweden; 20 March 1876–19 April 1880	Succeeded by Arvid Posse
Cultural offices
Preceded by Anders Magnus Strinnholm	Swedish Academy, Seat No.17; 1862–1896	Succeeded by Pehr Jacob von Ehrenheim
