= Ludvig Almqvist =

Swedish politician and judge (1818–1884)

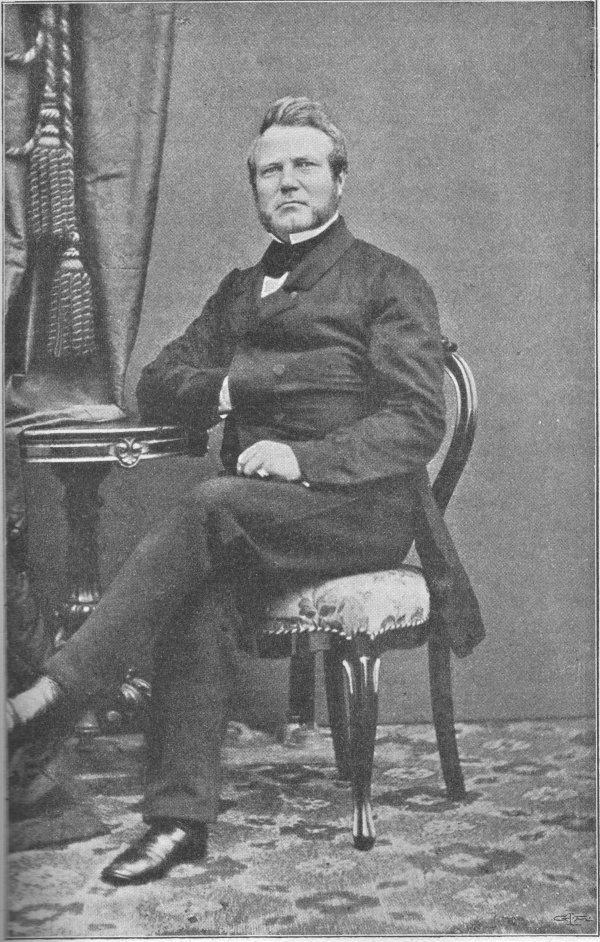
- Born: January 4, 1818; Gränna, Sweden
- Died: August 26, 1884 (aged 66); Selaön, Sweden
- Occupation(s): Member of the Riksdag, judge

Ludvig Teodor Almqvist (January 4, 1818 – August 26, 1884) was a Swedish politician and judge.

== Biography ==
Almqvist was born in Gränna, Sweden, to Sven Johan Almqvist, vicar and priest.

In 1835, Almqvist began his studies at Uppsala University. In 1846, he became assessor of the Svea Court of Appeal and, in 1848, secretary to the auditor. In 1853, he was appointed chief justice of Öster- and Västerrekarne, Daga, Åkers and Selebo hundred district, and was appointed deputy justice ombudsman the following year. In 1856, he bought the Algö estate in Överselö.

He served as the Minister for Civil Service Affairs in Louis De Geer’s first cabinet (1856–1860). From 1867 to 1869 he was a member of the Riksdag (Parliament)'s upper house. In 1867, he was elected to be its first deputy speaker. On November 2, 1860, he took his place as member of the Supreme Court of Sweden. In 1867, he became Chief Justice of the Svea Court of Appeal. The following year he received his doctorate in law. In 1870, he became a member of the Supreme Court of Sweden again. Almqvist served as Minister for Justice in Louis De Geer’s second cabinet (1879–1880).

Almqvist was made an honorary member of the Royal Swedish Academy of Agriculture and Forestry in 1857 and a knight of the Order of the Seraphim in 1882. On May 5, 1860, he was made a Commander Grand Cross of the Order of the Polar Star along with Commander Grand Cross of the Order of St. Olav.

On August 26, 1884, Almqvist died at the Algö estate on Selaön.

=== Family ===
Almqvist married Sophie Antoinette Eugenie Björkman in 1851. The couple had six children, two girls and four boys. Daughter Carolina "Lina" Almqvist married Erik Gustaf Boström, who went on to become Prime Minister of Sweden. The other daughter, Clara, died at 10 months old in 1854. Son Sven Almqvist (1855–1910) married Anna Björkman (daughter of Axel Björkman and Marie Norlin). Son Robert Magnus Almqvist reached 80 years of age (1857–1938) and died in Herrnhut, Saxony, Germany. He was one of the founders of the publishing company Almqvist & Wiksell and the father of military man and historian Sven Almqvist. Son Carl Ludvig Almqvist (1860–1920) was married to Eva Häggström (1878–1962) and the couple took over the Algö estate. The couple also had son Knut Almqvist (1863–1937).

His brother, Johan Magnus Almqvist, was a theologian and politician who served as a member of the Riksdag of the Estates for the clergy class.
