= St. Peter's Priory, Lund =

Church building in Lund Municipality, Skåne County, Sweden

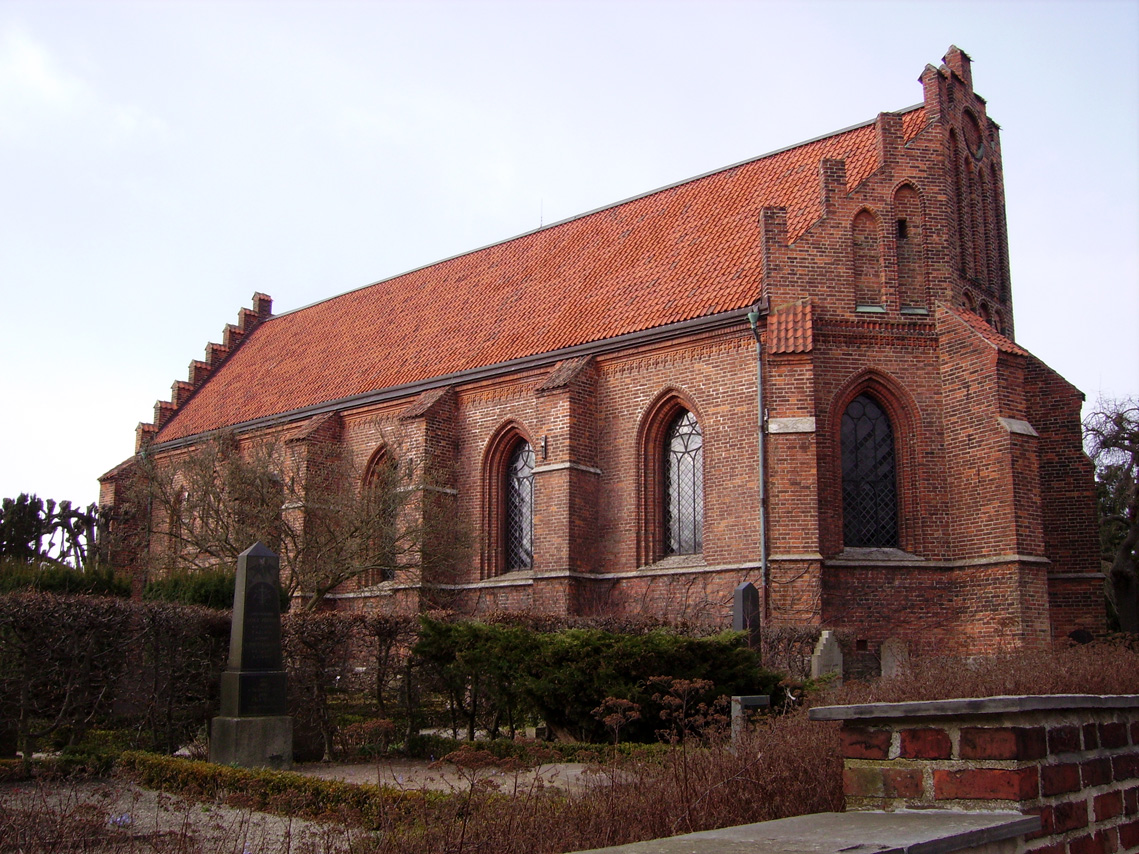
St. Peter's Priory Church

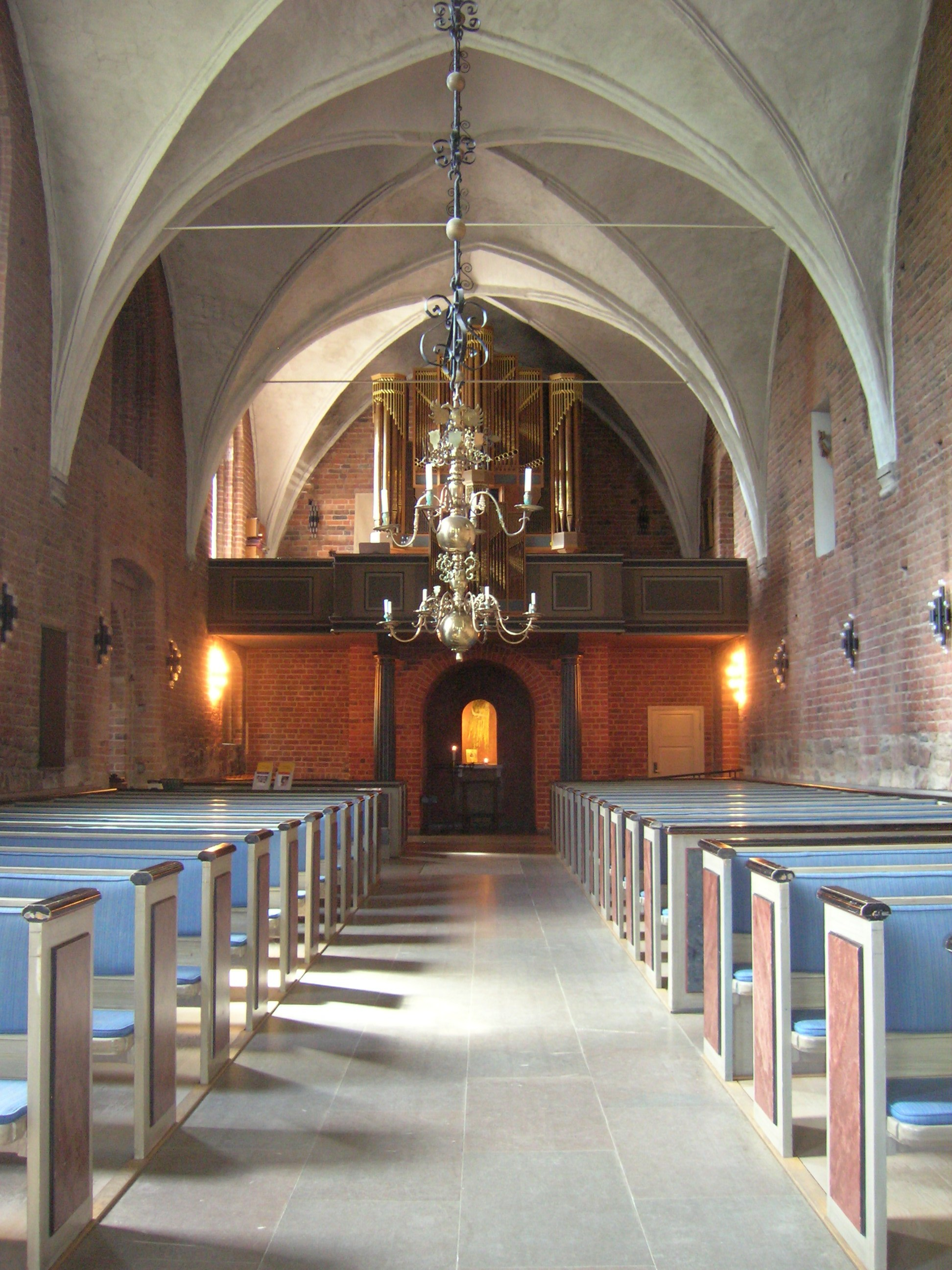
Interior of the church

St. Peter's Priory (Swedish: Sankt Peters Klosters kyrka) was one of Denmark's early monastic houses. It was located in Lund, Skåne, now southern Sweden, formerly part of Denmark.

== History ==
St. Peter's Priory was established before 1166 during the tenure of Eskil, Archbishop of Lund, for Benedictine nuns. It was originally dedicated to Saint Mary and Saint Peter, but by 1200 it was simply referred to as St. Peter's Priory. The original church was built in the latter half of the 1160s of sandstone with the rounded arches of the Romanesque style.

The church was rebuilt in brick and expanded about 1300 in the Gothic style. The entire complex consisted of three ranges with the priory church forming the fourth side of a quadrilateral enclosure. The complex included a dormitory, refectory and cellars, and a wing for lay sisters. The church over time came into possession of many income properties which paid rents to sustain the priory. There are records of several exchanges of farms between St. Peter's Priory and the chapter of Lund Cathedral.

In the course of the Reformation Denmark became officially a Lutheran kingdom in October 1536. All religious houses and their many acquired income properties reverted to the crown. The entire archive of the priory was lost except for a few letters regarding the disposition of the priory near the time of the Reformation. The last letter of the prioress, dated 1537, giving up the priory is found among them. The estate was given to Eskil Oxe by the crown until 1565 when it passed into the possession of Jorgen and Inger Brahe, the maternal uncle and aunt of Tycho Brahe, the famous Danish astronomer.

About 1600 all the conventual buildings were demolished, leaving the priory church to serve as the parish church of St Peter's. The burial ground continued to be used for burials until modern times.

== Gallery ==
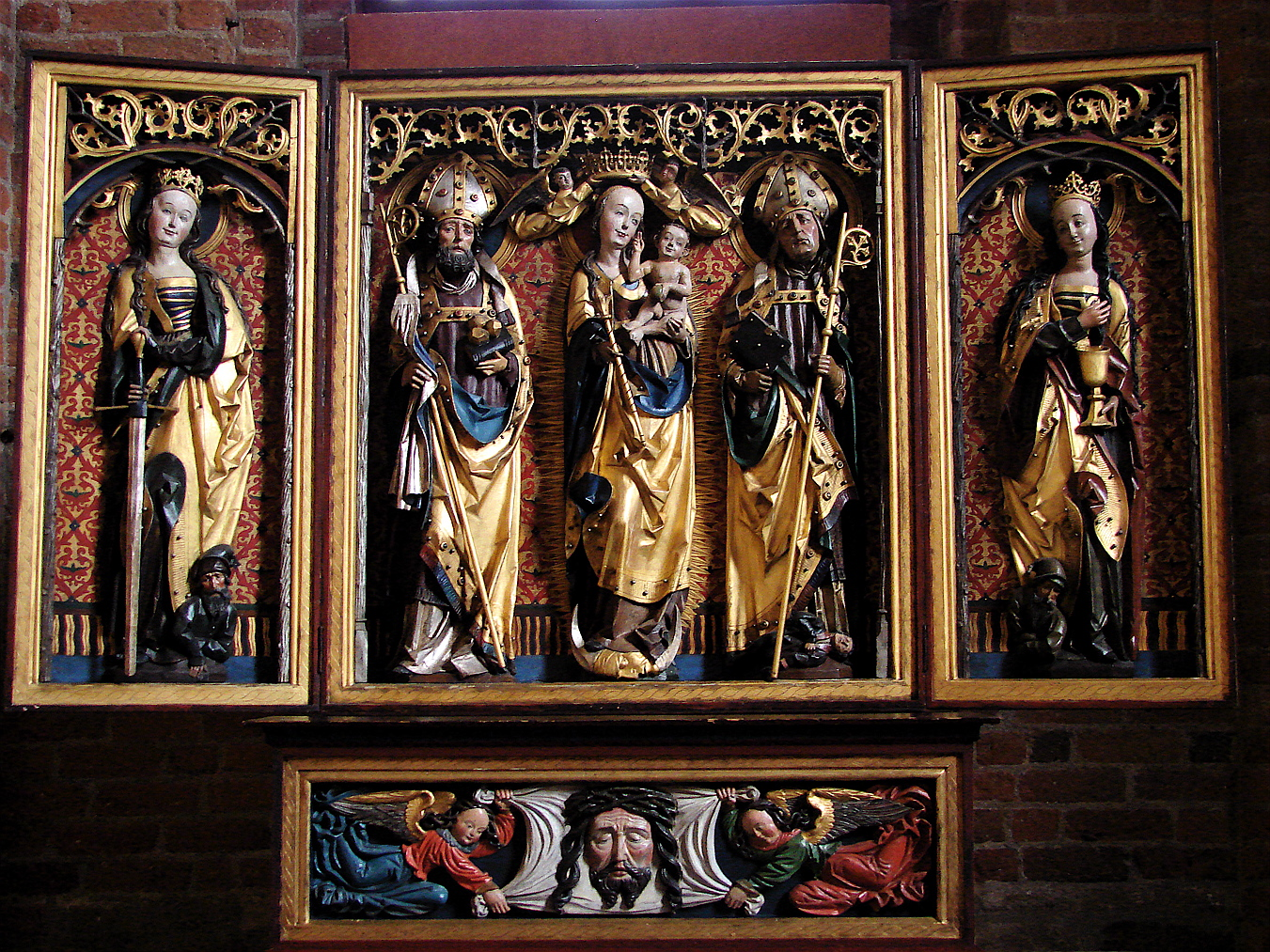
Altarpiece

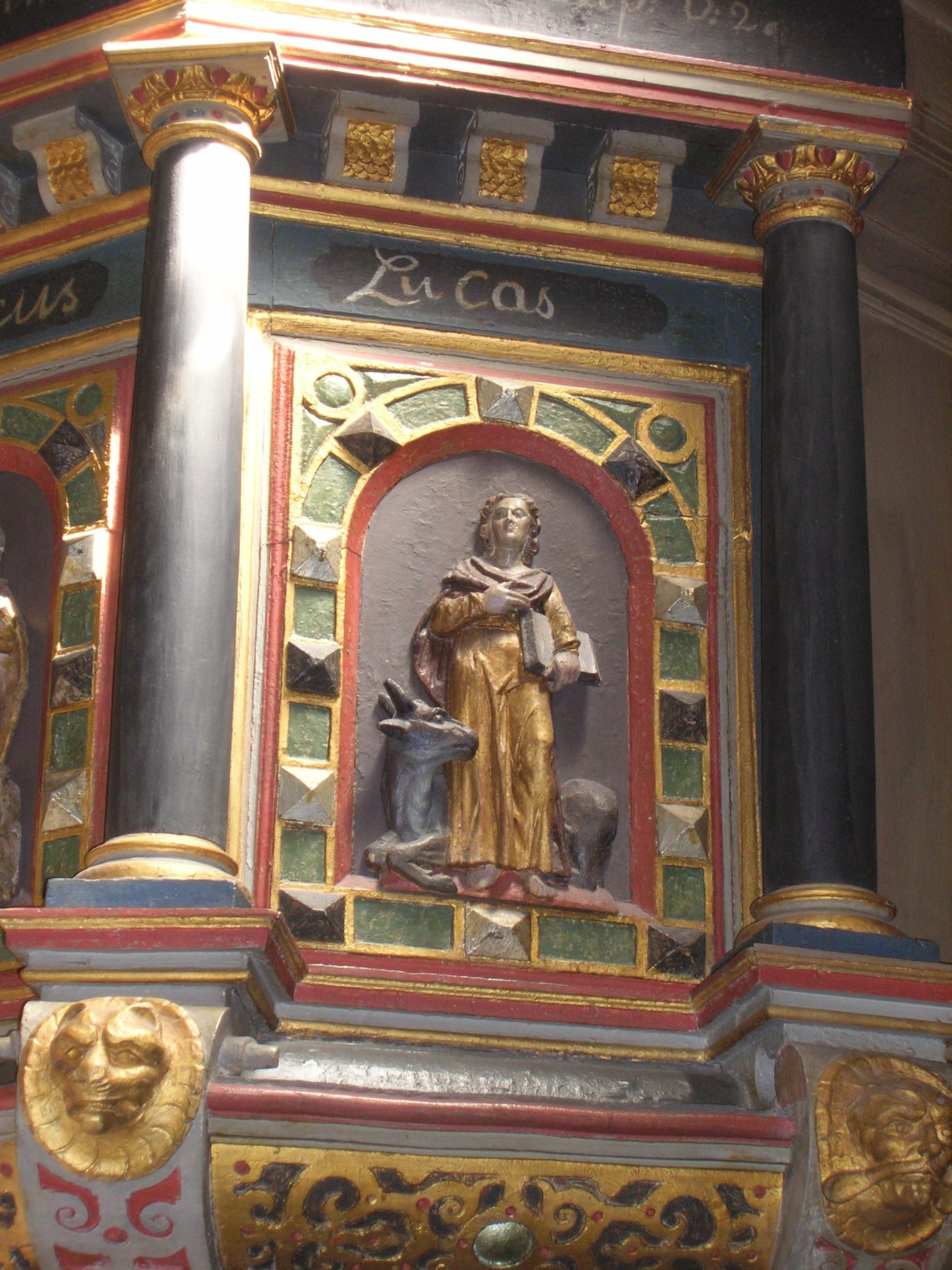
Pulpit

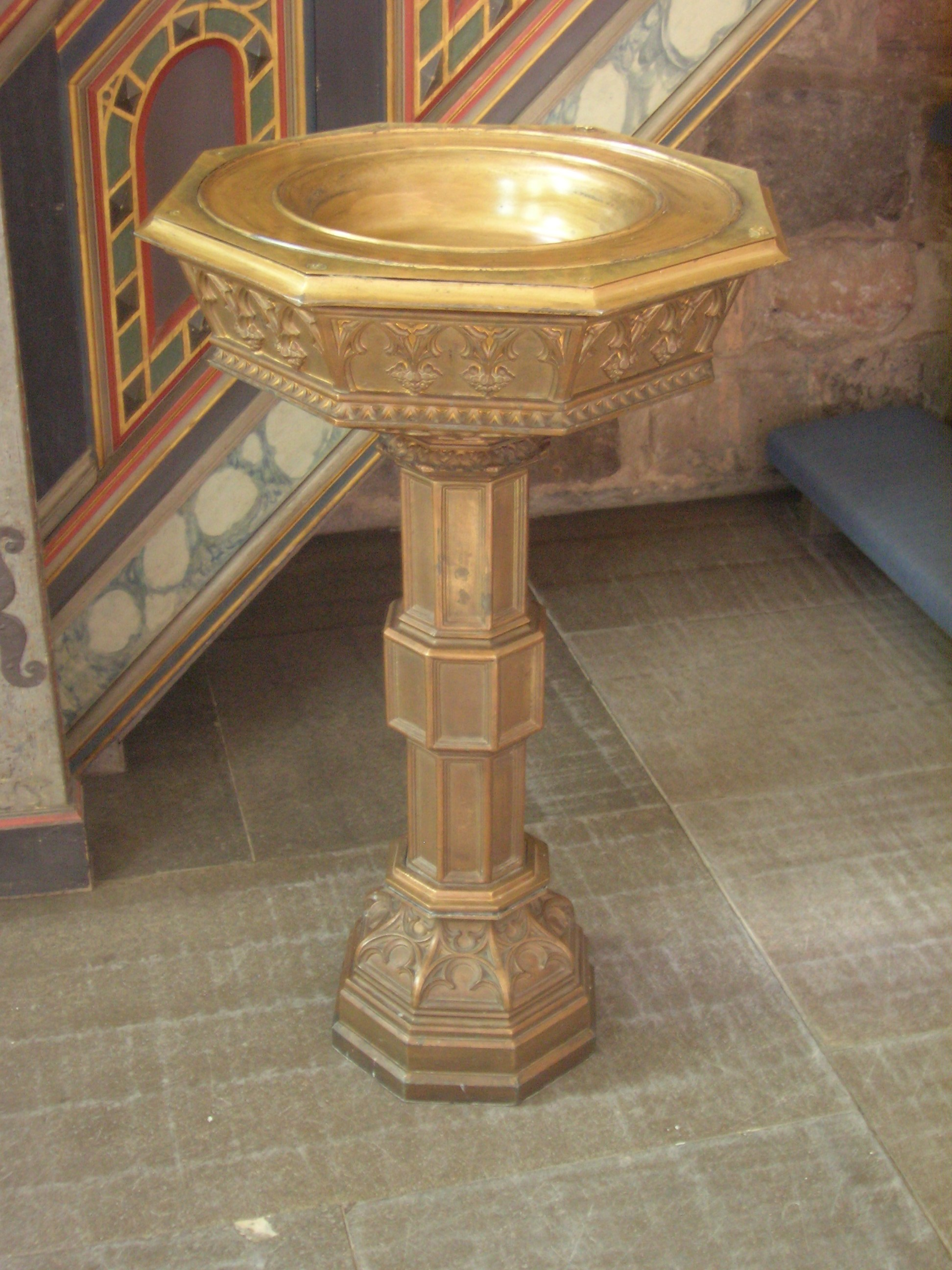
Baptismal font

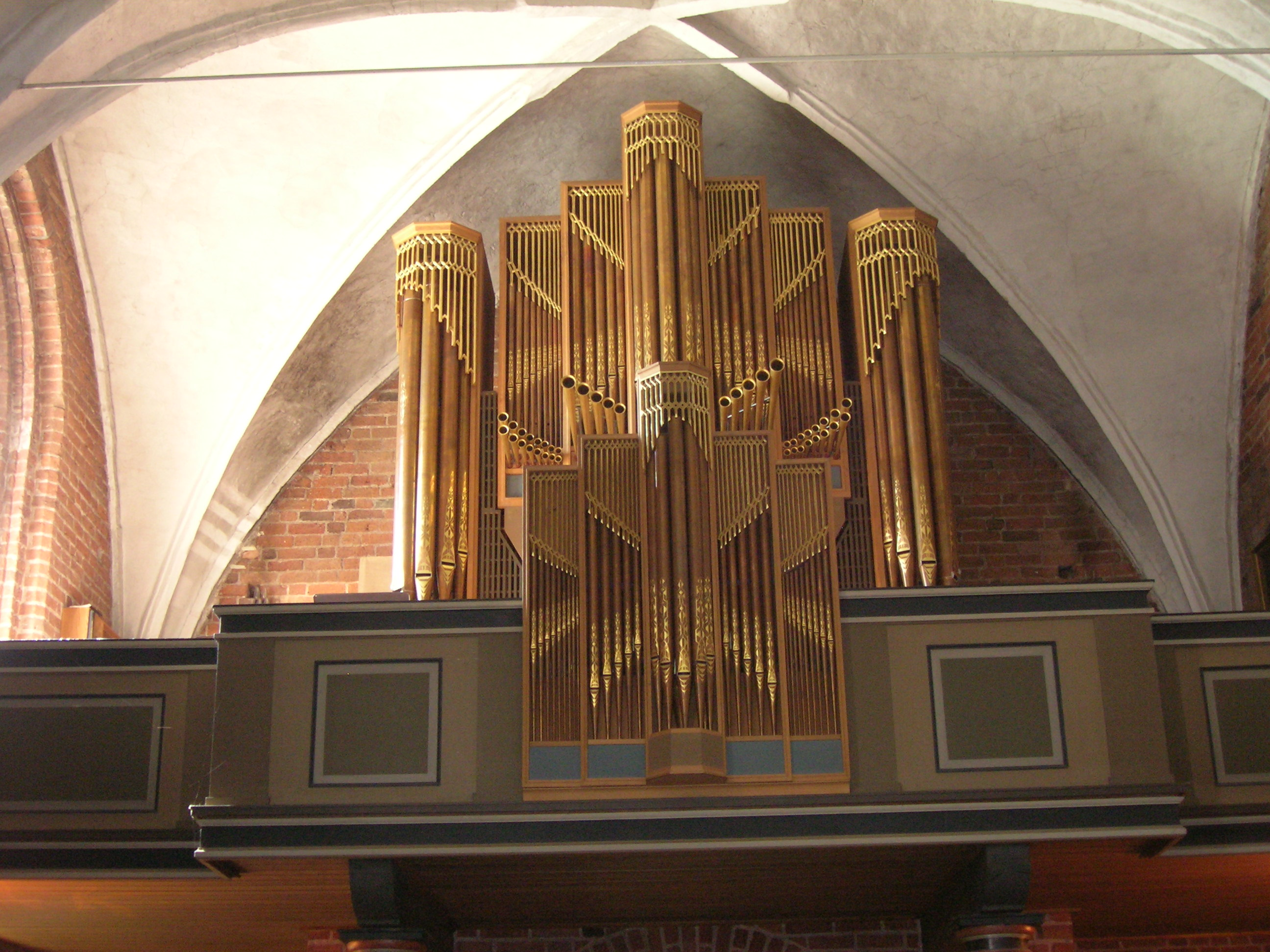
Organ
