= Georg Bissmark =

Swedish jurist (1871–1941)

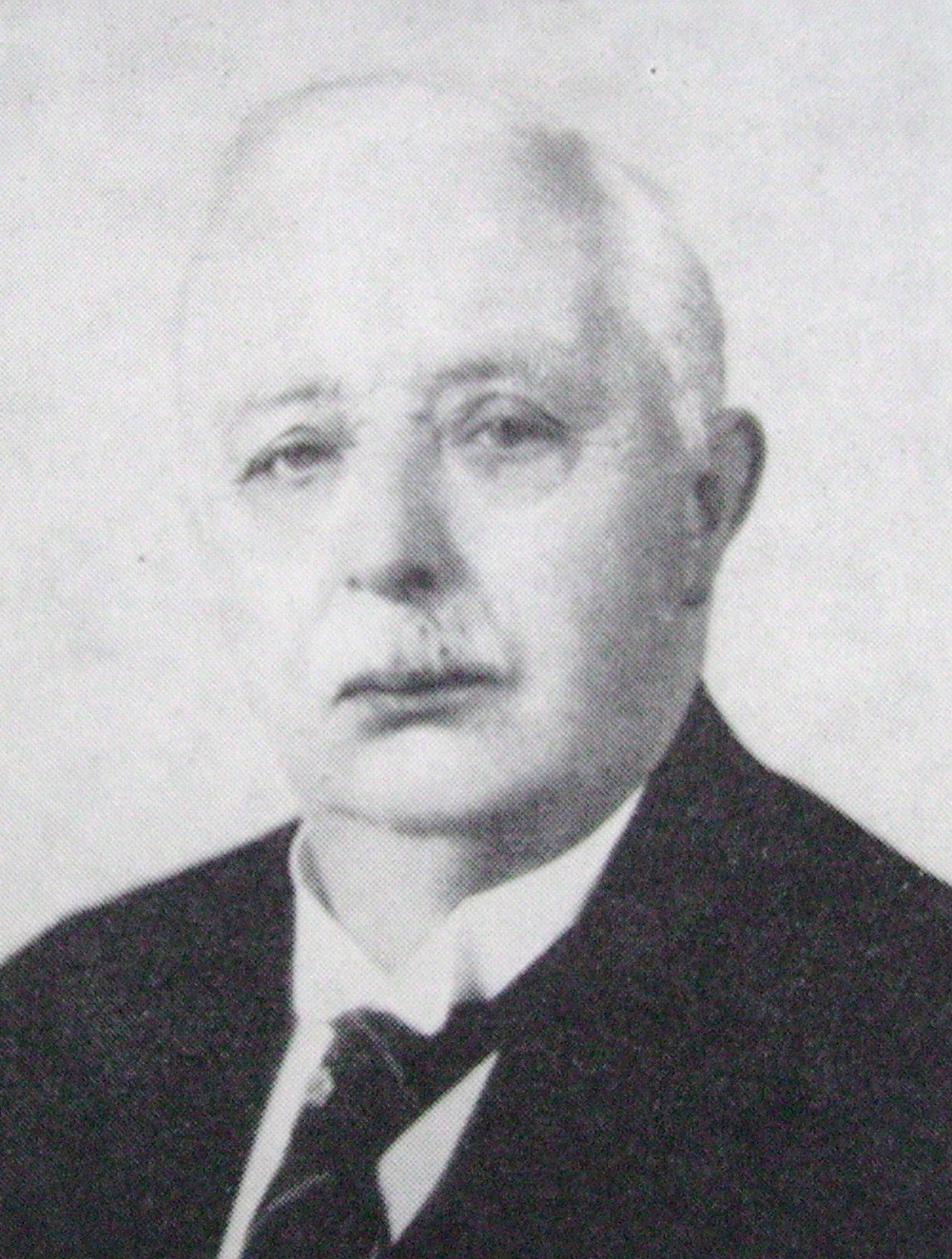

Minister of Justice
- In office 1928–1930
- Prime Minister: Arvid Lindman

Personal details
- Born: Georg Fredrick Bissmark; 7 February 1871 Halmstad, Sweden
- Died: 13 December 1941 (aged 70)
- Education: Uppsala University
- Occupation: Jurist

Georg Bissmark (1871–1941) was a Swedish jurist and politician. He was a member of the Riksdag. He served as the mayor of Halmstad between 1918 and 1938 and minister of justice between 1928 and 1930.

== Biography ==
Bissmark was born in Halmstad on 7 February 1871. His father was a businessman and local politician. His ancestors migrated from Pomerania in the 18th century. He received a degree in law from Uppsala University in 1895. After his graduation he worked at several courts until 1898 when he returned to his hometown where he assumed different legal posts. In 1918 he was elected as the mayor of Halmstad which he held until 1938.

Bissmark was also a member of the county council in Halmstad. He joined the National Party and had a conservative political stance. He was a member of the Riksdag between 1927 and 1934. In the minority cabinet led by the conservative Prime Minister Arvid Lindman Bissmark was the minister of justice from 1928 to 1930. In 1930 he became chairman of a committee which was formed to review the working process of the Riksdag.

Bissmark was married and had three children. He died on 13 December 1941.
