= Jubilee doctor =

Degree awarded to 50-year PhD or similar holders

A jubilee doctor (Swedish: jubeldoktor, Finnish: riemutohtori, Latin: doctor jubilaris) or golden doctor (German: Goldene Doktor) is in some countries a person who has held a doctorate for 50 years or more. When 50 years have passed, the doctor is invited again by his or her university to the ceremony where the doctorates are conferred and is made jubilee/golden doctor and celebrated as a guest of honour. This custom is common in Germany, Sweden and Finland. In Germany, this ceremony is referred to as the "Golden Promotion" (Goldene Promotion). In Sweden, a person so honoured who holds, for instance, a doctorate of philosophy, may use the academic title fil.jubeldr instead of the regular fil.dr.
