= Thorwald Bergquist =

Swedish jurist and politician (1899–1972)

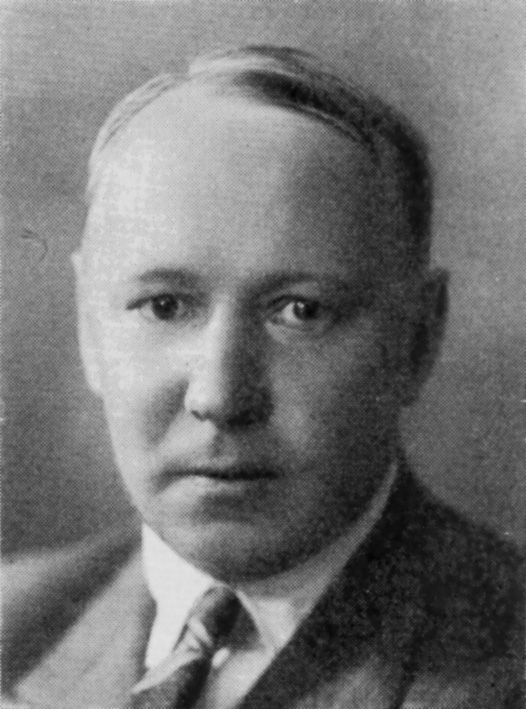
Thorwald Bergquist

Thorwald Bergquist (1 December 1899 – 3 December 1972) was a Swedish politician who held various cabinet and political posts. He was a member of the People's Party. Johan Östling argues that Bergquist was one of the Swedish generation of 1945 figures who had a rationalist approach towards cultural affairs and who experienced the World War I period.

== Biography ==
Bergquist was born Nävelsjö, Jönköping County, on 1 December 1899. He held a degree in law.

After working at courts in 1931 Bergquist became the secretary of the second team committee at the Riksdag. He was the mayor of Västerås in the period 1933–1939 and director general of the national board of health and welfare between 1939 and 1946. In 1936 he served as the minister of state and minister of justice. In the period 1939–1943 he was the state minister in the cabinet led by the Prime Minister Per Albin Hansson. In 1943 he was made justice minister in the same cabinet and held the post until July 1945. One of the topics which Bergquist focused on was the criminal law reform.

Bergquist was a member of the People's Party and represented the party in the second chamber of the Riksdag in the period 1937–1942 and in the first chamber from 1943 to 1947. He died on 3 December 1972.
