= Gerhard Louis De Geer =

Prime Minister of Sweden from 1920 to 1921

His Excellency Gerhard Louis De Geer
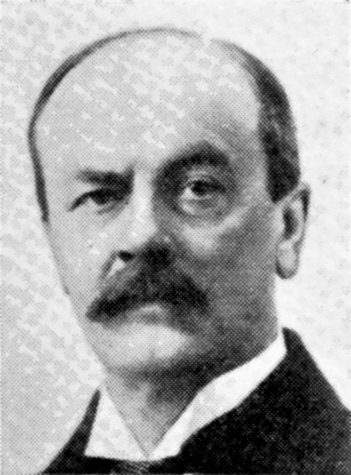

Prime Minister of Sweden
- In office 27 October 1920 – 23 February 1921
- Monarch: Gustaf V
- Preceded by: Hjalmar Branting
- Succeeded by: Oscar von Sydow

Personal details
- Born: Gerhard Louis De Geer af Finspång; 27 November 1854 Kristianstad, Sweden
- Died: 25 February 1935 (aged 80) Östra Göinge, Sweden
- Party: Independent
- Spouse: Magdalena Sörensen (m. 1883; died 1925)
- Children: 5
- Parent(s): Louis Gerhard De Geer; Caroline Wachtmeister
- Education: Uppsala University

Baron Gerhard Louis De Geer of Finspång (usually known as Louis De Geer; 27 November 1854 – 25 February 1935) was a Swedish politician, who served in the first chamber of the Riksdag 1901–14, was governor of Kristianstad County 1905–23, and Prime Minister of Sweden for 121 days in 1920–1921. He was a son of Sweden's first Prime Minister, Louis Gerhard De Geer.

== Biography ==
Louis De Geer was born into a Swedish noble family on 27 November 1854, son of the former prime minister Louis Gerhard De Geer (1818–1896) and Countess Caroline Wachtmeister, daughter of Count Carl Axel Wachtmeister. He was born in Kristianstad in the province of Scania, Kristianstad County. After juridical studies at the University of Uppsala, he entered politics. He was a member of the first chamber as a representative of Kristianstad County 1901–14 and served as governor of that county 1905–23. De Geer was at first a moderate liberal, but became a member of the minority party in the first chamber. At the inception of the Liberal Coalition Party in 1912, he joined them. By 1914, he left that party, and becoming a political maverick. In the following years he was chairman of the committee that came up with the suggestion of an eight-hour work day in 1919, which strengthened his ties to the social democrats.

The sitting prime minister Hjalmar Branting had to resign after the election loss in 1920, but stalled the process just to block a right-wing government. The Head of State, King Gustav V, queried the party leaders about the conditions of the party-based parliament. The right-wing leaders protested, but the social democrats accepted the interim government appointed by the King.

The king called De Geer to the office of prime minister, in a coalition government of liberals and moderate conservatives. The government was to sit until the parliamentary elections in October 1921, the first elections with general voting rights.

Neither the left nor the right parties supported De Geer and his government. When a proposition on higher duty on coffee, by minister of finance Henric Tamm, was heavily voted down, Tamm put himself up for a vote of confidence, and was forced to resign office. Three days later, De Geer followed his resignation. De Geer's resignation came after the other ministers of the government had composed a joint letter of resignation, demanding the king to choose between them and the prime minister.

== Person ==
In the early 1900s Louis De Geer was everything a politician should be: from a noble family and a high-ranking government official. His father had implemented the representationsreformen in 1865, and now he would hand over power to the parties after the first election with general voting rights.

== Political beliefs ==
He strongly opposed any plans to keep the union between Sweden and Norway against the will of the Norwegian people. In the issue of voting rights, he joined the liberal party line and the demands for majority elections. He was a clear proponent of a strong army, unlike the liberal party leader Karl Staaff.

De Geer was of a reclusive and mild character. Neither the left nor the right felt compelled to support his government – on the contrary, both sides wanted to be able to portray the government as an enemy for the coming election.

== See also ==
- Swedish Prime Ministers

== Bibliography ==
Books

- Anrep, Gabriel (1858), Svenska Adelns Ättar-Taflor: Abrahamsson - Granfelt, Volym 1, Stockholm: P.A. Norstedt & söner, p. 554
- Åman, Johannes (2012), Sveriges statsministrar under 100 år. Louis De Geer dy, Albert Bonniers förlag

Political offices
Preceded by Hjalmar Branting	Prime Minister of Sweden; 1920–1921	Succeeded by Oscar von Sydow
