= Branting II cabinet =

Government of Sweden from 1921 to 1923

- Cabinet of Sweden

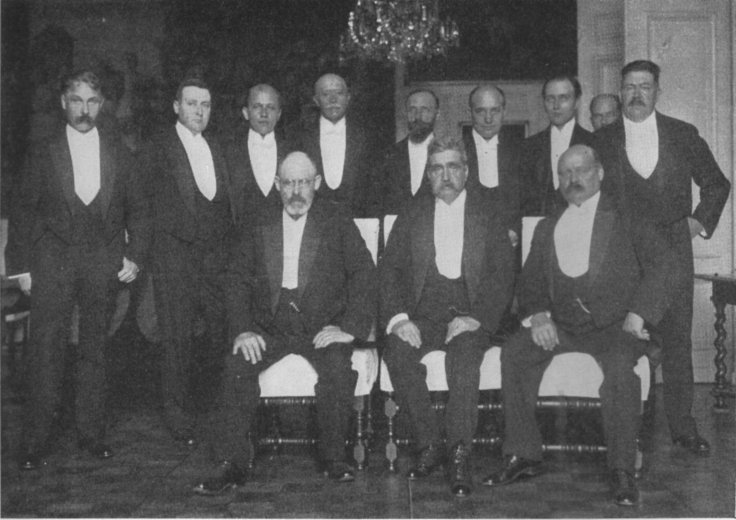
- Sitting from the left: Thorsson, Branting, Lindqvist. Standing from the left: Olsson, Nothin, Schlyter, Åkerman, Linders, Hansson, Örne, Sandler, Svensson.
- Date formed: 13 October 1921
- Date dissolved: 19 April 1923

People and organisations
- Head of state: Gustav V
- Head of government: Hjalmar Branting
- Member party: Social Democrats
- Status in legislature: Single-party minority (upper & lower house)
- Opposition parties: General Electoral League; Liberal Coalition Party; Farmers' League; Communist Party of Sweden; Social Democratic Left Party of Sweden

History
- Incoming formation: 1921 election
- Election: 1921 election
- Predecessor: von Sydow cabinet
- Successor: Trygger cabinet

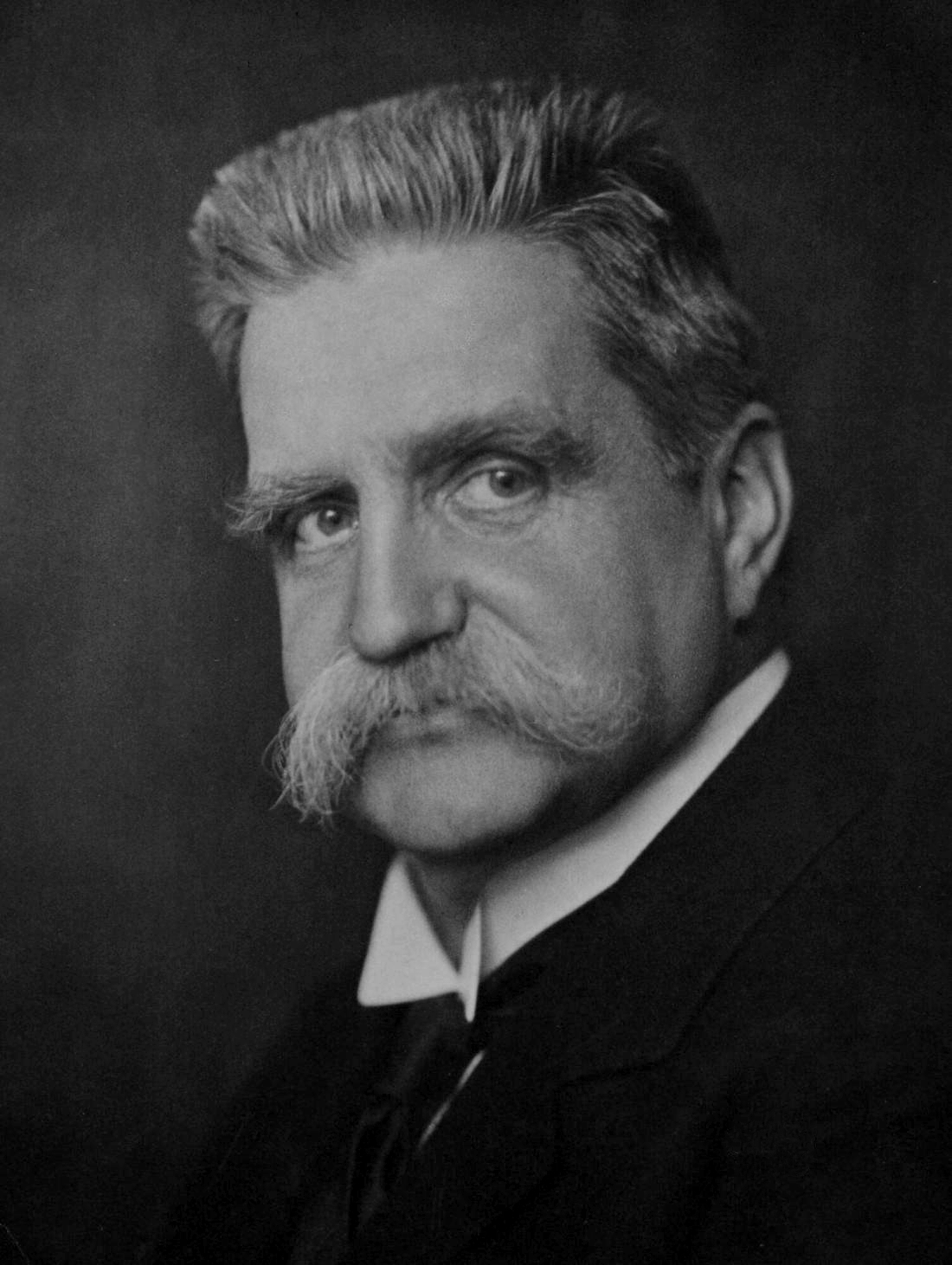
Prime Minister Hjalmar Branting.

The Branting II cabinet (Swedish: regeringen Branting II) was the government of Sweden from 13 October 1921 to 19 April 1923. It was a Social Democratic single-party minority government led by Prime Minister Hjalmar Branting. Branting had previously been prime minister in 1920 until his defeat in the 1920 general election.

== History ==
In the 1921 general election, the Social Democrats received 36.2 percent of the votes and Hjalmar Branting was tasked with forming a government.

The discussions in the beginning of the 1920s concerning the trade of alcohol, had forced all of the parties to take position. In 1920 the congress of the Social Democrats declared that Riksdag should not accept a ban of alcohol if not the referendum gave two-thirds majority for a ban. The government ordered a prohibition referendum, that ended with a meagre majority for the opposition.

In 1922, the Riksdag had decided that employees in a labour market conflict should not get unemployment support. I the beginning of 1923 a conflict emerged within the industry and 4 000 workers got suspended from supportive by the unemployment commission. The government suggested in a proposition to the Riksdag that the right to support should remain for the workers that have been in unemployment for at least six months. When the proposition did not pass the first chamber the government resigned on 6 April 1923.

== Ministers ==
Portfolio	Minister	Took office	Left office	Party
Prime Minister's Office
Prime Minister, Head of the Prime Minister's Office	Hjalmar Branting	13 October 1921	19 April 1923	Social Democrats
Ministry of Justice
Minister for Justice, Head of the Ministry of Justice	Assar Åkerman	13 October 1921	19 April 1923	Social Democrats
Ministry of Defence
Minister for Defence, Head of the Ministry of Defence	Per Albin Hansson	13 October 1921	19 April 1923	Social Democrats
Ministry of Health and Social Affairs
Minister for Health and Social Affairs, Head of the Ministry of Health and Social Affairs	Bernhard Eriksson	13 October 1921	19 April 1923	Social Democrats
Ministry for Communications
Minister for Communications, Head of the Ministry of Communications	Anders Örne	13 October 1921	19 April 1923	Social Democrats
Ministry of Finance
Minister for Finance, Head of the Ministry of Finance	Fredrik Vilhelm Thorsson	13 October 1921	19 April 1923	Social Democrats
Ministry of Education and Ecclesiastical Affairs
Minister of Education and Ecclesiastical Affairs, Head of the Ministry of Education and Ecclesiastical Affairs	Olof Olsson	13 October 1921	19 April 1923	Social Democrats
Ministry of Agriculture
Minister for Agriculture, Head of the Ministry of Agriculture	Sven Linders	13 October 1921	19 April 1923	Social Democrats
Ministry of Commerce and Industry
Minister of Commerce and Industry	Carl Svensson	13 October 1921	19 April 1923	Social Democrats
Other Ministers
Konsultativt statsråd	Rickard Sandler	13 October 1921	19 April 1923	Social Democrats
Konsultativt statsråd	Torsten Nothin	13 October 1921	19 April 1923	Social Democrats
Konsultativt statsråd	Karl Schlyter	13 October 1921	19 April 1923	Social Democrats

Preceded by von Sydow cabinet	Cabinet of Sweden; 1921–1923	Succeeded by Trygger cabinet
