= Swedish Compulsory National Service Act =

1940 Swedish law requiring military service for students

The Swedish Compulsory National Service Act was a controversial law proposed in the Riksdag in 1940 by Minister for Education Gösta Bagge to improve national defence; it was finally passed by the Riksdag in 1941, in a much-revised version. Another key player in the political struggle surrounding the compulsory national service was the Swedish Finance Minister Ernst Wigforss.

== Background ==
The question of introducing compulsory national service for Swedish youth in secondary schools was raised in the winter of 1940 as a response to increased threat levels and a perceived regional insecurity due to the Second World War.

== Proposal ==
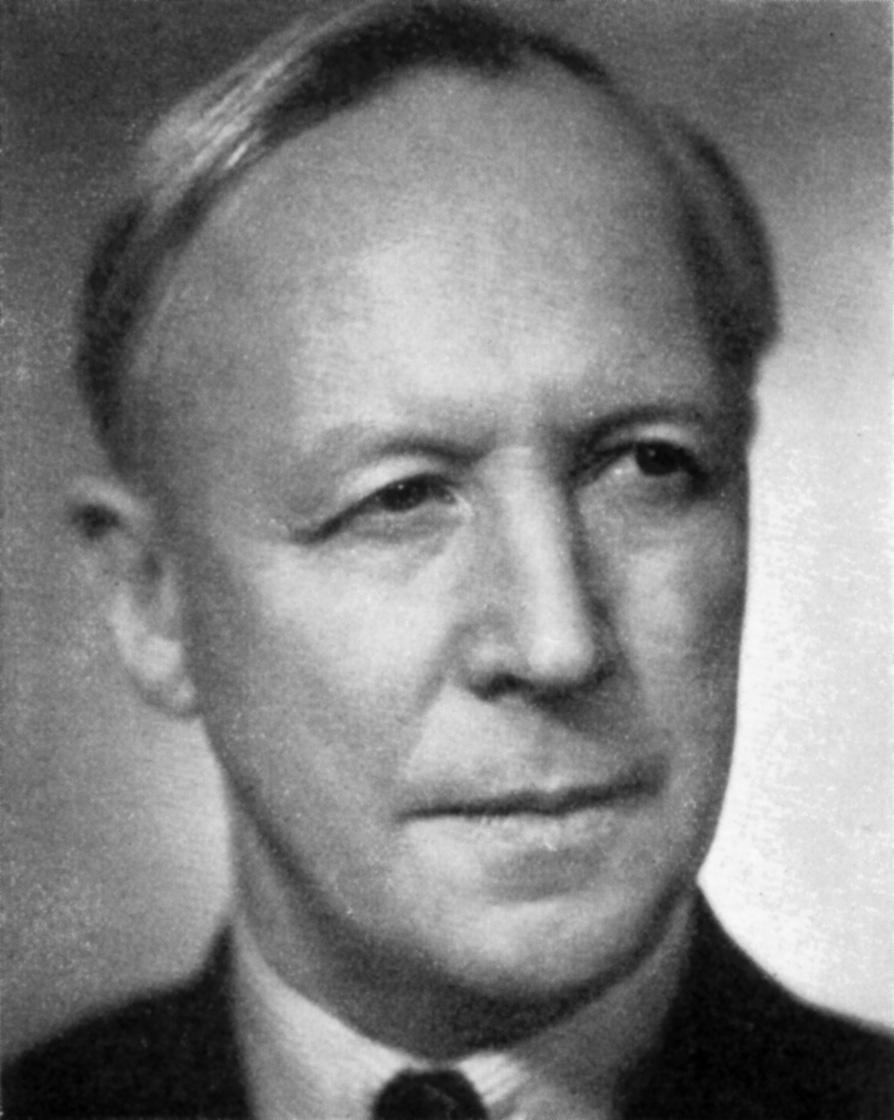
Ernst Wigforss

"De unga skola läras att förstå att de äro lämmar I fosterlandets stora organism och att individen måste lyda. Den naturliga auktoritetstron får icke undergrävas, och lydnadsplikten skall anammas som ett samhällets nödvändiga och självklara krav."

"The young shall be taught to understand, that they are limbs in the fatherlands great organism and that the individual must obey … The natural authority belief can not be undermined, and the duty of obedience shall be adopted as a society’s necessary and obvious demand”.

The proposed motion was that military education would be carried out in grammar schools, girls' schools, and other secondary schools as well as in primary schools. The education would consist of two parts: outdoor recreation days during the term and youth camps during summer vacation.

Some of the military exercises (such as air-, gas- and fire protection, target-spotting, reconnaissance and reporting, and casualty care) would be coeducational, while others would be gender-specific. It was recommended that grenade-throwing exercises (with dummies) would start in grades 6 and 7, while target practise with air or small-bore rifles would occur from grade 8 in primary school.

The stated aim of the motion was to prepare the Swedish population for total war and give it knowledge about general security and safety measures, and a degree of familiarity with weapons and shooting. However, another secondary priority which was supposed to be achieved through the military exercises was the creation of a good public spirit; integration between social classes was also predicted. Finally, the motion implied that teachers at these camps would undergo an instructor training program and, having taken the program, would be qualified for permanent teaching jobs.

== Press opinions ==
The proposition produced a heated debate, with strongly polarised opinions in the media – from outright rejection to unreserved support. The division largely followed the political spectrum, with conservative newspapers such as Nya Dagligt Allehanda, Svenska Dagbladet and Hallands Nyheter praising the proposition on the ground that it would lead to “disciplining and a spiritual uplift” of the youth, while the left generally was very critical of the motion. The Social Democratic newspaper Socialdemokraten endorsed the proposition on the ground of its potential effects on social integration. However, further to the left the opinion was overwhelmingly negative; the syndicalist newspaper Arbetaren stated that the proposition would lead to “the militarisation and barbarisation of the young souls”, and several others went as far as drawing parallels to Hitler-Jugend. Göteborgs-Tidningen expressed the concern that the aim was to create a Swedish Kraft Durch Freude phalanx and Eskilstuna-Kuriren claimed that the motion was dominated by “emotional thinking”, declaring that Sweden did not need a “Per Albin-Jugend”.

Objections to the motion mainly concerned:

- The military orientation of the program, especially concerning younger students
- The state's mandatory camps
- The alleged Nazi German model
- The proposed instructor training program

== Consulting opinions ==
When the bill was presented to the Riksdag on 21 March 1941, it included a very select range of statements from the consulting organisations; the bill contained comprehensive reports from the public and church authorities, but a limited number of opinions from the roughly 20 volunteer organizations which had also commented on the proposal. The selection of statements from the consulting bodies demonstrates disregard for the opinions of the volunteer organizations and an unwillingness to reveal criticism of the motion by the Ministry of Education and Ecclesiastical Affairs. Notably, the National Board of Education endorsed most of the motion, but rejected the compulsory instructor program for teachers. The response from the other consultative bodies was mixed; certain organizations criticised the entire motion and others certain aspects of it, while still others supported it without any objections. The official summary presented to the Riksdag failed to reflect this diversity.

== Passage ==
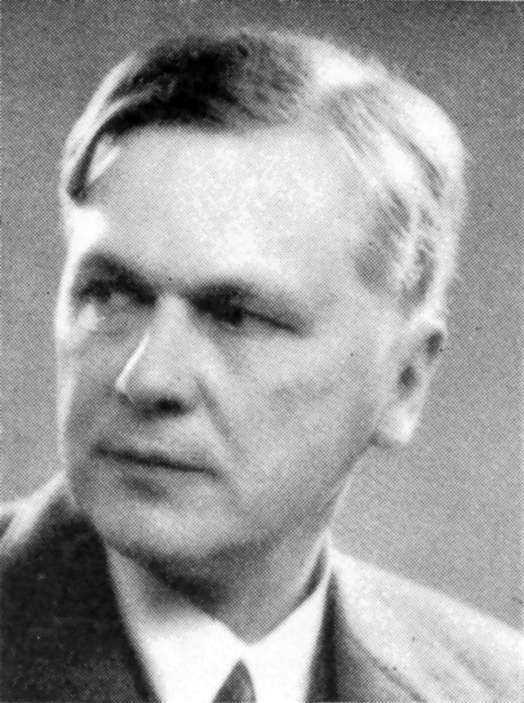
Gösta Bagge

When the government was to revise the motion, Gösta Bagge proposed changes in accordance with the advisory opinion of the National Board of Education. However, Ernst Wigforss (the Finance Minister) opposed the resolution. Both threatened to resign to get their way, raising the possibility of a government crisis in the middle of the war. Despite this, the proposition was brought to the Riksdag on 21 March 1941. The first chamber ratified it and the second did not, leading to more modifications in an attempt to reach a compromise. Certain key issues were removed in the final version, which was ratified on 23 June 1941.

This version differed from the first motion:

- No weapons training for younger pupils
- Shooting practice optional for grammar-school students
- No compulsory summer camp
- No compulsory instructor program for teachers

== Effect on students ==
The modified act was implemented during 1941, although preparations had been made during 1940 to train teachers at grammar schools for the exercises. The exercises which were enacted during 1941 were entirely of a military nature; shooting practise, although optional, was performed by most male grammar-school students. Other exercises (compulsory for male students) included grenade throwing, training in military units and camping. Training of the female students had a different focus; their training included reconnaissance, medical treatment, orienteering and swimming. These compulsory National Service exercises were carried out in secondary schools, while variations (with less military emphasis) were carried out in primary schools. Of the average 11.1 outdoor recreation days in 1941–42, 9.3 were used for compulsory national service training. Of the 7,258 male secondary-school students eligible for National Service training, 6,932 participated; the number of participating female secondary-school students was 3,471 of 3,728. The training continued until the end of the Second World War, and was discontinued by an act of law in the spring of 1945.
