= Minister of Education and Ecclesiastical Affairs =

Minister of Education and Ecclesiastical Affairs of Sweden
- Ecklesiastikminister
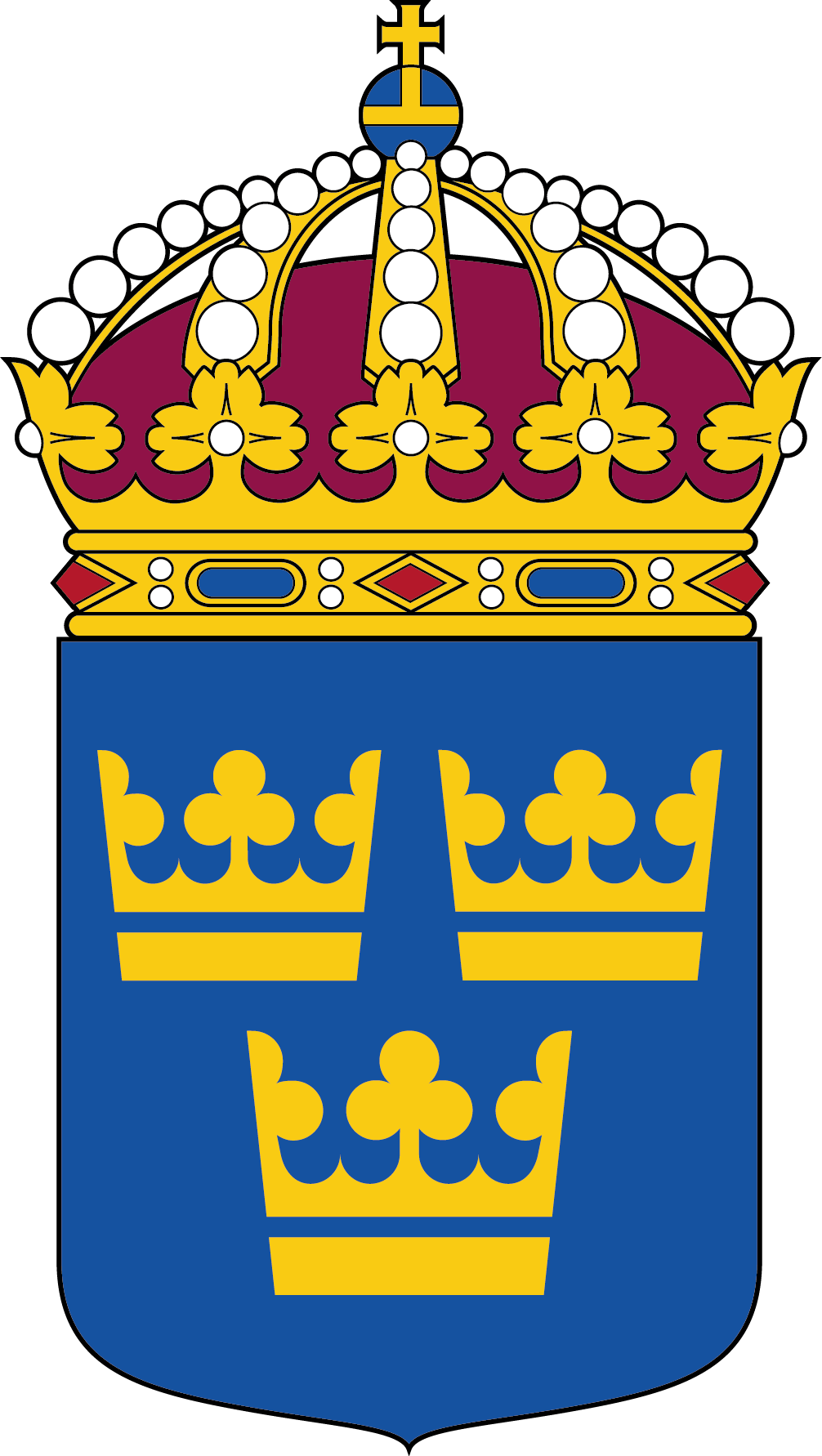
- Lesser coat of arms of Sweden
- Ministry of Education and Ecclesiastical Affairs
- Appointer: The Prime Minister
- Term length: No fixed term Serves as long as the Prime Minister sees fit
- Formation: 16 May 1840
- First holder: Albrecht Elof Ihre
- Final holder: Olof Palme
- Abolished: 31 December 1967
- Superseded by: Minister for Education

The Minister of Education and Ecclesiastical Affairs (Swedish: Ecklesiastikminister) was a member of the government of Sweden. The minister of education and ecclesiastical affairs was the head of the Ministry of Education and Ecclesiastical Affairs from 1840 to 1967 which handled matters concerning the church, education, science, culture, medical and general health care as well as poorhouses. The minister of education and ecclesiastical affairs became the minister for education on 1 January 1968.

== History ==
The Ministry of Education and Ecclesiastical Affairs was established in 1840 and Albrecht Elof Ihre became the first minister of education and ecclesiastical affairs. The head of the ministry bore the official title "cabinet minister and the head of the royal ministry of education and ecclesiastical affairs", but in everyday speech was usually called the minister of education and ecclesiastical affairs. In the early 1900s, other officials at the ministry were: one director general for administrative affairs (expeditionschef), three deputy directors (kansliråd) and director (byråchef), six administrative officers (kanslisekreterare), a registrar and a number of amanuenses (extra ordinary officials).

The Ministry of Education and Ecclesiastical Affairs became the Ministry of Education and Cultural Affairs on 1 January 1968 and thus the position of minister of education and ecclesiastical affairs became the minister for education. Olof Palme became the last minister of education and ecclesiastical affairs on 31 December 1967 and the first minister of education on 1 January 1968.

== List of officeholders ==
Color key

Independent
Historical parties: Lantmanna Moderate National Party Liberals Liberals Liberals Liberals
Present parties: Social Democrats Moderate Centre Left Liberals Christian Democrats Green Sweden Democrats

=== 1840–1967 ===
Portrait	Minister (Born-Died)	Term			Political Party	Coalition	Cabinet
Portrait	Minister (Born-Died)	Took office	Left office	Duration	Political Party	Coalition	Cabinet
Albrecht Elof Ihre	Albrecht Elof Ihre (1797–1877)	16 May 1840	29 December 1842	2 years, 227 days	Independent	–	Charles XIV John
Samuel Grubbe	Samuel Grubbe (1786–1853); Acting	10 September 1840	29 December 1842	2 years, 110 days	Independent	–	Charles XIV John
Christopher Isac Heurlin	Christopher Isac Heurlin (1786–1860)	29 December 1842	18 May 1844	1 year, 141 days	Independent	–	Charles XIV John
Fredrik Otto Silfverstolpe	Fredrik Otto Silfverstolpe (1795–1882)	18 May 1844	10 April 1848	3 years, 328 days	Independent	–	Oscar I
Paulus Genberg	Paulus Genberg (1811–1875)	10 April 1848	2 April 1852	3 years, 358 days	Independent	–	Oscar I
Henrik Reuterdahl	Henrik Reuterdahl (1795–1870)	3 April 1852	9 March 1855	2 years, 340 days	Independent	–	Oscar I
Lars Anton Anjou	Lars Anton Anjou (1803–1884)	9 March 1855	29 January 1859	3 years, 326 days	Independent	–	Oscar I
Henning Hamilton	Henning Hamilton (1814–1886)	29 January 1859	2 November 1860	1 year, 278 days	Independent	–	Oscar I
Carl Johan Thyselius	Carl Johan Thyselius (1811–1891)	2 November 1860	1 August 1863	2 years, 272 days	Independent	–	Oscar I
Fredrik Ferdinand Carlson	Fredrik Ferdinand Carlson (1811–1887)	1 August 1863	3 June 1870	6 years, 306 days	Independent	–	Oscar I
Gunnar Wennerberg	Gunnar Wennerberg (1817–1901)	3 June 1870	11 May 1875	4 years, 342 days	Independent	– –	Charles XV; Oscar II
Fredrik Ferdinand Carlson	Fredrik Ferdinand Carlson (1811–1887)	11 May 1875	1 November 1878	3 years, 174 days	Independent	–	De Geer II; De Geer III
Carl Gustaf Malmström	Carl Gustaf Malmström (1822–1912)	1 November 1878	27 August 1880	1 year, 300 days	Independent	–	Posse
Carl Hammarskjöld	Carl Hammarskjöld (1838–1898)	27 August 1880	6 February 1888	7 years, 163 days	Independent	–	Thyselius; Themptander
Gunnar Wennerberg	Gunnar Wennerberg (1817–1901)	6 February 1888	6 November 1891	3 years, 273 days	Moderate	– – Lantmanna–M	G. Bildt; Åkerhielm; Boström I
Gustaf Gilljam	Gustaf Gilljam (1832–1908)	6 November 1891	22 June 1898	6 years, 228 days	Independent	Lantmanna–M	Boström I
Nils Claëson	Nils Claëson (1848–1910)	22 June 1898	5 July 1902	4 years, 13 days	Independent	M–Lantmanna	von Otter
Carl von Friesen	Carl von Friesen (1846–1905)	5 July 1902	10 June 1905	2 years, 340 days	Independent	M–Lantmanna	Boström II; Ramstedt
Karl Husberg	Karl Husberg (1854–1928)	19 June 1905	2 August 1905	44 days	Independent	M–Lantmanna	Ramstedt
Hjalmar Hammarskjöld	Hjalmar Hammarskjöld (1862–1953)	2 August 1905	7 November 1905	97 days	Independent	M–Lantmanna–L	Lundeberg
Fridtjuv Berg	Fridtjuv Berg (1851–1916)	7 November 1905	29 May 1906	203 days	Liberals	–	Staaf I
Hugo Hammarskjöld	Hugo Hammarskjöld (1845–1937)	29 May 1906	11 June 1909	3 years, 13 days	National Progress Party	M–Lantmanna–Första kammarens moderata parti–National Progress Party	Lindman I
Elof Lindström	Elof Lindström (1863–1924)	11 June 1909	7 October 1911	2 years, 118 days	Independent	M–Lantmanna–Första kammarens moderata parti–National Progress Party	Lindman I
Fridtjuv Berg	Fridtjuv Berg (1851–1916)	7 October 1911	17 February 1914	2 years, 133 days	Liberals	–	Staaf II
Karl Gustaf Westman	Karl Gustaf Westman (1876–1944)	17 February 1914	30 March 1917	3 years, 41 days	National Party	–	Hammarskjöld
Alexis Hammarström	Alexis Hammarström (1858–1936)	30 March 1917	19 October 1917	203 days	Independent	Electoral League–National Party	Swartz
Värner Rydén	Värner Rydén (1878–1930)	19 October 1917	28 November 1919	2 years, 40 days	Social Democrats	S–L	Edén
Olof Olsson	Olof Olsson (1872–1939)	28 November 1919	27 October 1920	334 days	Social Democrats	–	Branting I
Bengt J:son Bergqvist	Bengt J:son Bergqvist (1860–1936)	27 October 1920	13 October 1921	351 days	Independent	–	De Geer von Sydow
Olof Olsson	Olof Olsson (1872–1939)	13 October 1921	19 April 1923	1 year, 188 days	Social Democrats	–	Branting II
Samuel Clason	Samuel Clason (1867–1925)	19 April 1923	18 October 1924	1 year, 182 days	Electoral League	–	Trygger
Olof Olsson	Olof Olsson (1872–1939)	18 October 1924	7 June 1926	1 year, 232 days	Social Democrats	–	Branting II
John Almkvist	John Almkvist (1875–1946)	7 June 1926	2 October 1928	2 years, 117 days	Liberals	L–L	Ekman I
Claes Lindskog	Claes Lindskog (1870–1954)	2 October 1928	7 June 1930	1 year, 248 days	Electoral League	–	Lindman II
Samuel Stadener	Samuel Stadener (1872–1937)	7 June 1930	24 September 1932	2 years, 109 days	Liberals	–	Ekman II
Arthur Engberg	Arthur Engberg (1888–1944)	24 September 1932	19 June 1936	3 years, 269 days	Social Democrats	–	Hansson I
Tor Andræ	Tor Andræ (1885–1947)	19 June 1936	28 September 1936	101 days	Independent	–	Pehrsson-Bramstorp
Arthur Engberg	Arthur Engberg (1888–1944)	28 September 1936	13 December 1939	3 years, 76 days	Social Democrats	S–C	Hansson II
Gösta Bagge	Gösta Bagge (1882–1951)	13 December 1939	15 December 1944	5 years, 2 days	Moderate	S–C–M	Hansson III
Georg Andrén	Georg Andrén (1890–1969)	15 December 1944	31 July 1945	228 days	Moderate	S–C–M	Hansson III
Tage Erlander	Tage Erlander (1901–1985)	31 July 1945	11 October 1946	1 year, 72 days	Social Democrats	–	Hansson IV
Josef Weijne	Josef Weijne (1893–1951)	11 October 1946	8 March 1951	4 years, 148 days	Social Democrats	–	Erlander I
Hildur Nygren	Hildur Nygren (1896–1962)	17 March 1951	1 October 1951	198 days	Social Democrats	–	Erlander I
Ivar Persson	Ivar Persson (1901–1979)	1 October 1951	30 October 1957	6 years, 29 days	Centre	S–C	Erlander II
Ragnar Edenman	Ragnar Edenman (1914–1998)	31 October 1957	29 September 1967	9 years, 333 days	Social Democrats	–	Erlander III
Olof Palme	Olof Palme (1927–1968)	29 September 1967	31 December 1967	93 days	Social Democrats	–	Erlander III
