= Hugo Hammarskjöld =

Swedish public servant and politician

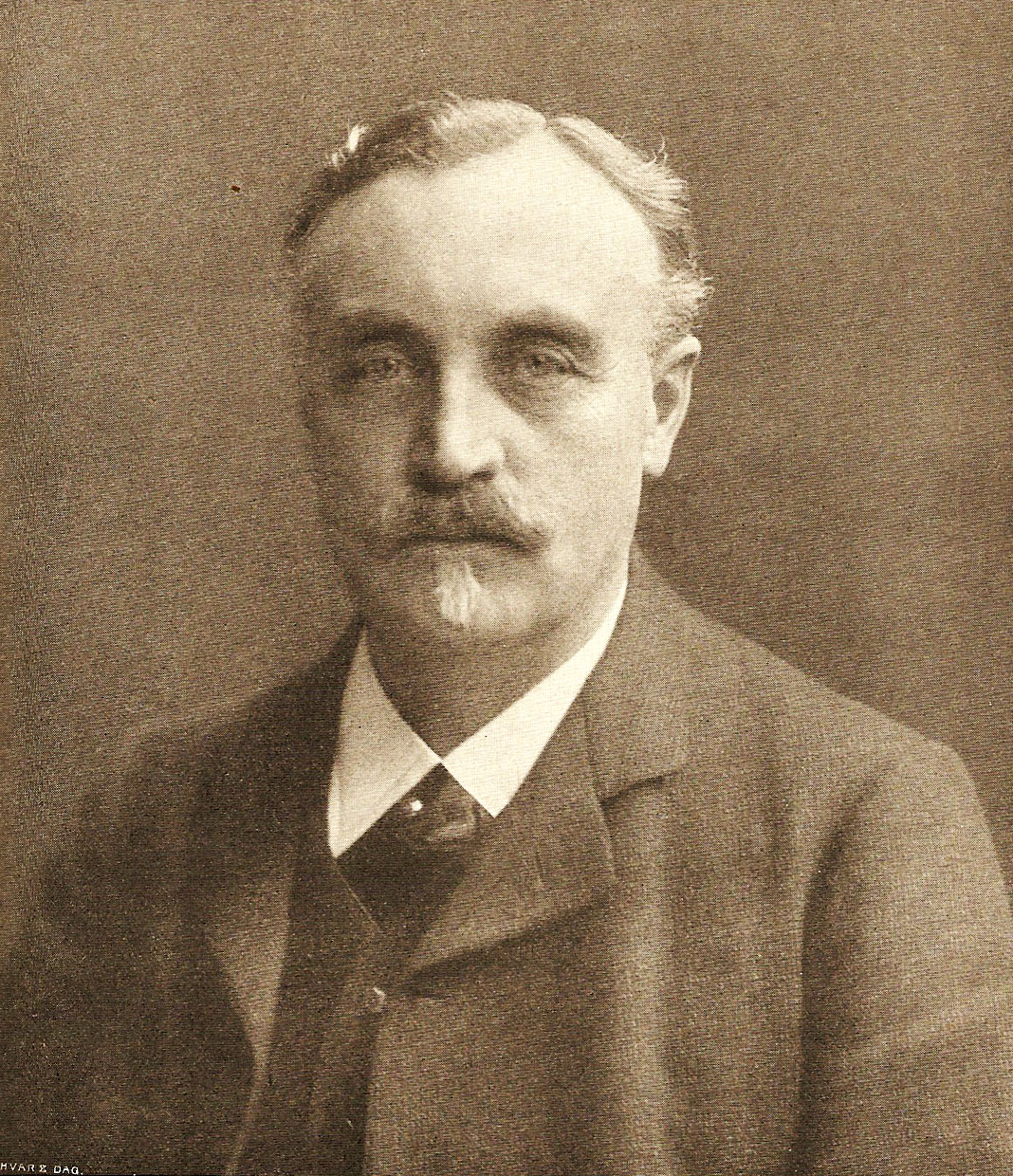
Hugo Hammarskjöld. Picture from Hvar 8 dag no. 19 from 1906.

Åke Hugo Hammarskjöld (20 January 1845 – 3 June 1937), was a Swedish public servant and politician, brother to Carl Hammarskjöld and cousin of Carl Gustaf Hammarskjöld and Hjalmar Hammarskjöld.

Hammarskjöld was born in Tuna, Kalmar County. His parents were captain Carl Leonard Hammarskjöld and Beata Hammarskjöld, born Tham. In 1870, he married Lucie von Krusenstjerna, daughter of Captain G. F. von Krusenstjerna and Fredrika von Krusenstjerna, born Danielsson.

After finishing secondary school at Katedralskolan, Uppsala, Hammarskjöld studied to become an architect at Konsthögskolan's (Higher School of Art), graduating in 1869. When his father died, the family willed the Tuna mansion to Hugo Hammarskjöld and brother Carl Hammarskjöld, whereupon Hugo would reside at the estate.

Hammarskjöld entered politics at a young age, but mostly dealt in church politics. He was elected to the second chamber of the Riksdag in 1893 and was re-elected in 1903 serving two separate terms, 1894–1896 and 1903–1908.

From 1909 to 1918 he was part of the Första kammaren. In 1905, he was offered a position as the Minister of Education and Ecclesiastical Affairs but declined. Nonetheless, another offer was made in 1906 from Arvid Lindman, which Hammarskjöld accepted. Even as a minister, Hammarskjöld's interest for religion and church related topics would to be critical. Through a proposal that the elementary school should be run by the city council in Sweden's biggest cities, something that already was being done in Stockholm, Gothenburg and Malmö, he received a great deal of resistance from the likes of Gottfrid Billing. When he later made a proposal concerning the so-called priestly privileges, which Hammarskjöld found old fashioned, and the wage control for priests, it was voted down in the first chamber. After this, Hammarskjöld chose to leave the government.

Hammarskjöld died in Tuna.

Government offices
Preceded by Fridtjuv Berg	Minister of Education and Ecclesiastical Affairs; 1906–1909	Succeeded by Elof Lindström
