= Ministry of religious affairs =

A ministry of religious affairs (sometimes with a similar name, like ministry of endowments) is a government department responsible for religious matters, including:

== Current ==
Country, state or territory	Subnational division	Ministry	Head	List
Afghanistan		Ministry of Hajj and Religious Affairs		
Algeria		Ministry of Religious Affairs	Minister of Religious Affairs	
Argentina		Ministry of Foreign Affairs and Worship	Minister of Foreign Affairs and Worship	list
Austria		Office of Religious Affairs, Chancellery		
Azerbaijan		State Committee for Work with Religious Organizations	Chairman of State Committee for Work with Religious Organizations	
Bahrain		Ministry of Justice and Islamic Affairs	Minister of Justice and Islamic Affairs	list
Bangladesh		Ministry of Religious Affairs	Minister of Religious Affairs	
Brunei		Ministry of Religious Affairs	Minister of Religious Affairs	
Cambodia		Ministry of Cult and Religion	Minister of Cult and Religion	
China		United Front Work Department (2018–present)		
China		State Administration for Religious Affairs (1951–2018)		
Comoros		Ministry of Justice, Islamic Affairs, Public Administration and Human Rights	Minister of Justice, Islamic Affairs, Public Administration and Human Rights	list
Denmark		Ministry of Ecclesiastical Affairs	Minister of Ecclesiastical Affairs	
Djibouti		Ministry of Muslim Affairs & Charitable Assets	Minister of Muslim Affairs & Charitable Assets	
Egypt		Ministry of Awqaf	Minister of Awqaf	
Finland		Ministry of Education and Culture		
France		Ministry of the Interior	Minister of the Interior (1912-)	
France			Minister of Worship (1804-1912)	
Germany				
	States of Germany		Minister of Education	
Greece		Ministry of Education and Religious Affairs		
Grenada		Division of Religious Affairs, Ministry of Education, Human Resource Development, Religious Affairs & Information		
India		Ministry of Minority Affairs		
India		Ministry of Culture		
Indonesia		Ministry of Religious Affairs	Minister of Religious Affairs	
Iran		Ministry of Culture and Islamic Guidance		
Israel		Ministry of Religious Services	Minister of Religious Services	
Japan		Religious Affairs Division, Agency for Cultural Affairs, Ministry of Education, Culture, Sports, Science and Technology		
Jordan		Ministry of Awqaf Islamic Affairs and Holy Places		
Kazakhstan		Ministry of Social Development		
Kuwait		Ministry of Awqaf and Islamic Affairs		
Luxembourg		Ministry of State	Minister for Religious Affairs	
Malaysia		Prime Minister's Department: Department of Islamic Development; Department of Awqaf, Zakat and Haji; Department of Syariah Judiciary	Minister in the Prime Minister's Department	
Maldives		Ministry of Islamic Affairs		
Morocco		Ministry of Habous and Islamic Affairs	Minister of Habous and Islamic Affairs	
Myanmar		Ministry of Religious Affairs		
Norway		Department of Consumer, Religious and Life Stance Affairs, Ministry of Children and Families		
Oman		Ministry of Endowments and Religious Affairs	Minister of Endowments and Religious Affairs	
Pakistan		Ministry of Religious Affairs	Minister of Religious Affairs	
Palestine		Ministry of Awqaf and Religious Affairs	Minister of Awqaf and Religious Affairs	
Puntland		Ministry of Justice, Constitution, Rehabilitation and Religious Affairs	Minister of Justice, Constitution, Rehabilitation and Religious Affairs	
Qatar		Ministry of Awqaf and Islamic Affairs	Minister of Awqaf and Islamic Affairs	
Saudi Arabia		Ministry of Islamic Affairs, Dawah, and Guidance		
Saudi Arabia		Ministry of Hajj and Umrah		
Serbia		Ministry of Religion		
Singapore			Minister-in-charge of Muslim Affairs	
South Sudan		Ministry of Gender, Social Welfare and Religious Affairs		
Sri Lanka		Ministry of Buddha Sasana, Religious and Cultural Affairs: Department of Buddhist Affairs; Department of Christian Religious Affairs; Department of Hindu Religious and Cultural Affairs; Department of Muslim Religious and Cultural Affairs		
Syria		Ministry of Endowments		
Sweden		Ministry of Education and Ecclesiastical Affairs	Minister of Education and Ecclesiastical Affairs	
Thailand		Religion Affairs Department, Ministry of Culture		
Thailand		National Office of Buddhism		
Tunisia		Ministry of Religious Affairs		
Turkey		Directorate of Religious Affairs		
Turkmenistan†		Ministry of Justice	Minister of Justice	list
Turks and Caicos Islands		Office of the Attorney General	Attorney General	list
Tuvalu		Office of the Attorney General	Attorney General	list
Uganda		Ministry of Justice and Constitutional Affairs	Minister of Justice	list
Ukraine		Ministry of Justice	Minister of Justice	list
United Arab Emirates†		Ministry of Justice	Minister of Justice	list
United Kingdom		Ministry of Justice	Lord Chancellor; Secretary of State for Justice	list
	Northern Ireland	Department of Justice	Minister of Justice; Attorney General for Northern Ireland	list
	Scotland	Learning and Justice Directorates	Cabinet Secretary for Justice	list
	Wales†		Counsel General	list
United States		United States Department of Justice	Attorney General	list
United States Virgin Islands		Department of Justice	Attorney General	list
Uzbekistan		Ministry of Justice	Minister of Justice	list
Vanuatu		Ministry of Justice	Minister of Justice	list
Venezuela		Ministry of Popular Power for Interior Relations, Justice and Peace	Minister of Popular Power for Interior Relations, Justice and Peace	list
Vietnam		Ministry of Ethnic and Religious Affairs	Minister of Ethnic and Religious Affairs	
Yemen†		Ministry of Justice	Minister of Justice	list
Zambia		Ministry of National Guidance and Religious Affairs		

Note:

- States of Germany Minister of Education ("Kultus", in its literal meaning) most well known for their administration of (previously Church-run) schools (and hence usually translated as ministers of education), yet remain competent for the relationships with the Churches. see also Conference of Ministers of Education
- In India, the Ministry of Minority Affairs is tasked with dealing with all kinds of minorities, including linguistic, ethnic, cultural and gender.
