= Minister for Education (Sweden) =

Swedish cabinet position

- Statsråd och chef för utbildningsdepartmentet
- Lesser coat of arms of Sweden

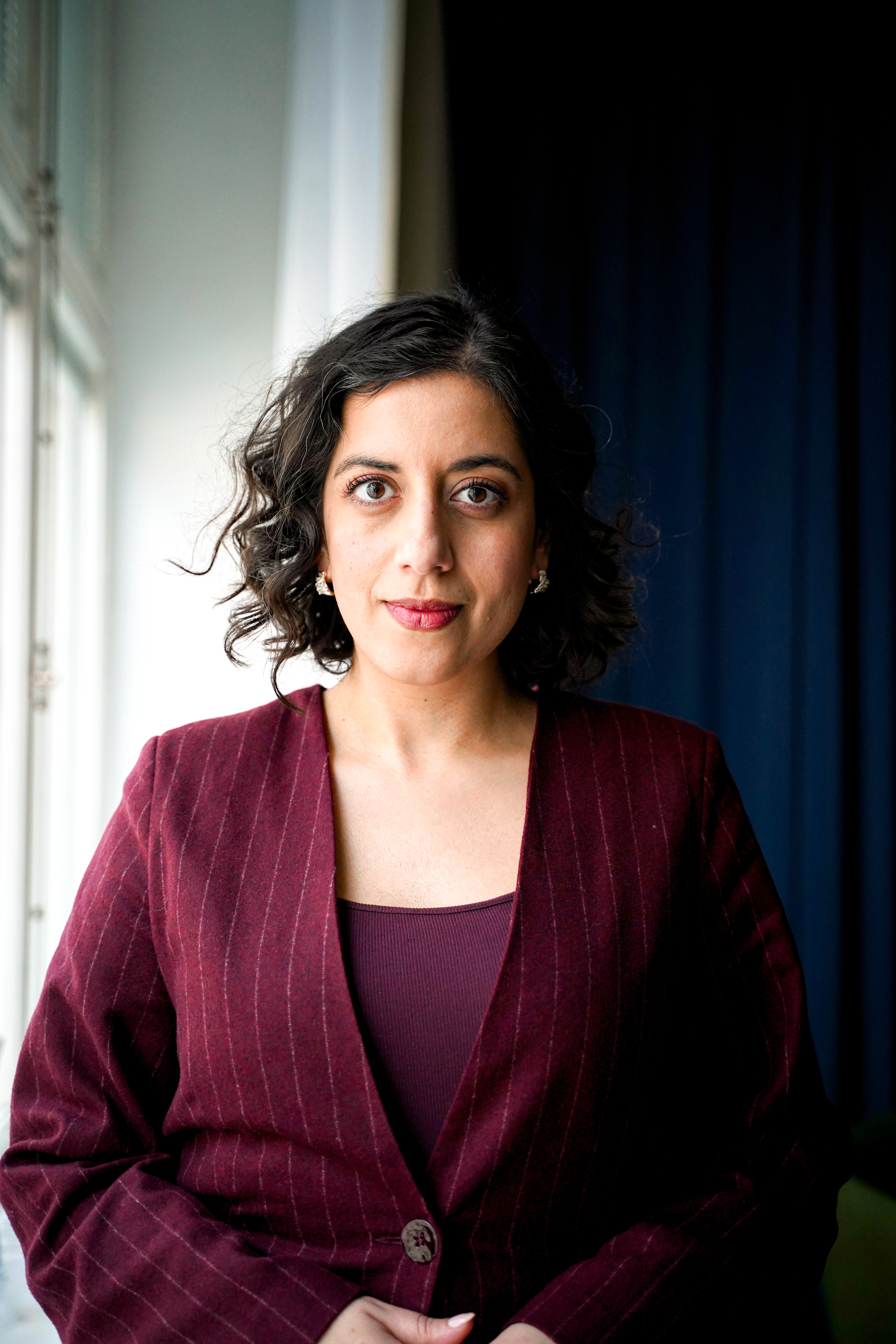
- Incumbent; Simona Mohamsson since 28 June 2025
- Ministry of Education and Research
- Member of: The Government
- Seat: Stockholm, Sweden
- Appointer: The Prime Minister
- Term length: No fixed term Serves as long as the incumbent doesn’t have majority support in the Riksdag or support from the Prime Minister
- Precursor: Minister of Education and Ecclesiastical Affairs
- Formation: 1 January 1968 (as Minister for Education); 6 June 1974 (as Councilor of State and Head of the Ministry of Education and Research)
- First holder: Olof Palme

The Minister for Education (Swedish: utbildningsminister) is the education minister of Sweden and the head of the Ministry of Education and Research.

The current minister for education is Simona Mohamsson of the Liberals.

== History ==
As a result of the ministry reform in 1840, the Ministry of Education and Ecclesiastical Affairs was instituted. The head of the ministry was the minister of education and ecclesiastical affairs, with the responsibility of culture, the Church of Sweden, research and education. In 1968, the Ministry of Education and Ecclesiastical Affairs changed its name to the Ministry of Education and Cultural Affairs (Swedish: Utbildningsdepartmentet), today called the Ministry of Education and Research. The head of the Ministry of Education and Research is the minister for education.

== List of officeholders ==
=== Minister for Education (1968—present) ===
Portrait	Minister (Born-Died)	Term			Political Party	Election	Prime Minister
Portrait	Minister (Born-Died)	Took office	Left office	Duration	Political Party	Election	Prime Minister
Olof Palme	Olof Palme (1927–1986)	1 January 1968	14 October 1969	1 year, 286 days	Social Democrats	1968	Tage Erlander (S)
Ingvar Carlsson	Ingvar Carlsson (born 1934)	14 October 1969	2 November 1973	4 years, 19 days	Social Democrats	–	Olof Palme (S)
Bertil Zachrisson	Bertil Zachrisson (1926–2023)	2 November 1973	8 October 1976	2 years, 341 days	Social Democrats	1973	Olof Palme (S)
Jan-Erik Wikström	Jan-Erik Wikström (1932–2024)	8 October 1976	8 October 1982	6 years, 0 days	Liberals	1976; 1979	Thorbjörn Fälldin (C) (1976 – 1978, 1979–1982); Ola Ullsten (L) (1978 – 1979)
Lena Hjelm-Wallén	Lena Hjelm-Wallén (born 1943)	8 October 1982	16 October 1985	3 years, 8 days	Social Democrats	1982	Olof Palme (S)
Lennart Bodström	Lennart Bodström (1928–2015)	16 October 1985	29 January 1989	3 years, 105 days	Social Democrats	1985; 1988	Olof Palme (S) (1985 – 1986); Ingvar Carlsson (S) (1986 – 1989)
Bengt Göransson	Bengt Göransson (1932–2021)	29 January 1989	3 October 1991	2 years, 247 days	Social Democrats	–	Ingvar Carlsson (S)
Per Unckel	Per Unckel (1948–2011)	3 October 1991	7 October 1994	3 years, 4 days	Moderate	1991	Carl Bildt (M)
Carl Tham	Carl Tham (born 1939)	7 October 1994	6 October 1998	3 years, 364 days	Social Democrats	1994	Ingvar Carlsson (S) (1994 – 1996); Göran Persson (S) (1996 – 2002)
Thomas Östros	Thomas Östros (born 1965)	6 October 1998	21 October 2004	6 years, 15 days	Social Democrats	– 2002	Göran Persson (S)
Leif Pagrotsky	Leif Pagrotsky (born 1951)	21 October 2004	6 October 2006	1 year, 350 days	Social Democrats	–	Göran Persson (S)
Lars Leijonborg	Lars Leijonborg (born 1949)	6 October 2006	7 September 2007	336 days	Liberals	2006	Fredrik Reinfeldt (M)
Jan Björklund	Jan Björklund (born 1962)	7 September 2007	3 October 2014	7 years, 26 days	Liberals	– 2010	Fredrik Reinfeldt (M)
Gustav Fridolin	Gustav Fridolin (born 1983)	3 October 2014	21 January 2019	4 years, 110 days	Green	2014	Stefan Löfven (S)
Anna Ekström	Anna Ekström (born 1959)	21 January 2019	18 October 2022	3 years, 270 days	Social Democrats	2018	Stefan Löfven; Magdalena Andersson (S)
Mats Persson	Mats Persson (born 1980)	18 October 2022	10 September 2024	1 year, 328 days	Liberals	2022	Ulf Kristersson (M)
Johan Pehrson	Johan Pehrson (born 1968)	10 September 2024	28 June 2025	291 days	Liberals	–	Ulf Kristersson (M)
Simona Mohamsson	Simona Mohamsson (born 1994)	28 June 2025	Incumbent	1 year, 71 days	Liberals	–	Ulf Kristersson (M)
