= Tobias Krantz =

Swedish politician

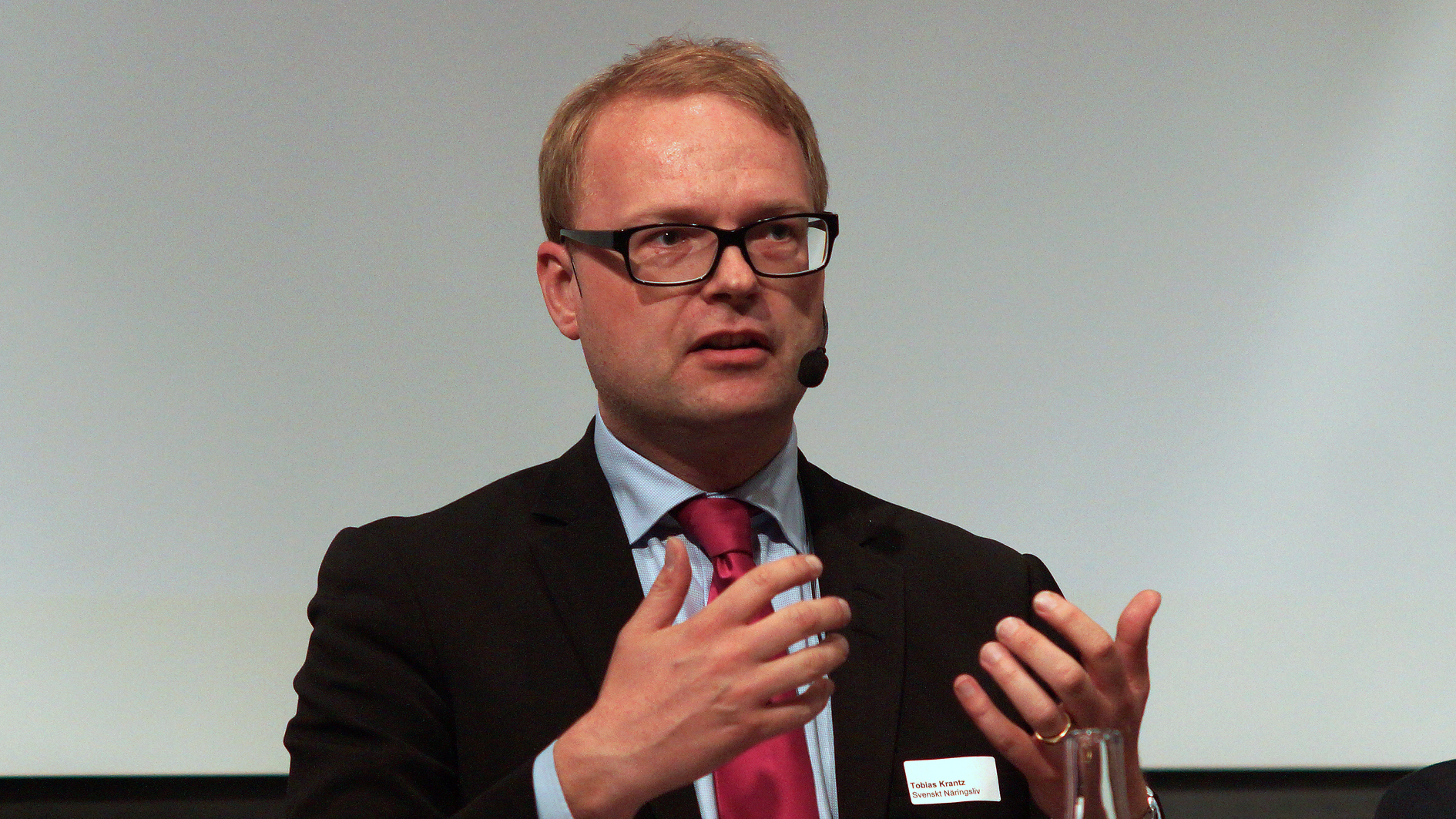

Minister for Higher Education and Research
- In office 17 June 2009 – 5 October 2010
- Prime Minister: Fredrik Reinfeldt
- Preceded by: Lars Leijonborg
- Succeeded by: Jan Björklund

Personal details
- Born: 7 April 1971 (age 55) Jönköping, Sweden
- Party: Liberal People's Party
- Education: Uppsala University

Tobias Kjell Bertil Krantz (born 7 April 1971) is a Swedish politician of the Liberal People's Party. He served as Minister for Higher Education and Research in the Swedish government between 17 June 2009 and 5 October 2010.

== Education ==
Tobias Krantz grew up in Bankeryd, Jönköping Municipality, Sweden. He earned a B.A. in politics, economics, history and French from Uppsala University in 1995. From 1995 to 2002 he was a Ph.D student and lecturer in political science at Uppsala University. His Ph.D. thesis, published in 2002, was titled The power over the region. A critical study of the debate about Swedish regions from 1963 to 1996.

== Political career ==
Krantz served as vice president of the Liberal Youth of Sweden from 1996 to 1999. He also worked as an editorial writer for Upsala Nya Tidning from 1994 to 1999. He was a member of the Liberal People's Party's committee on higher education from 2000 to 2001, and worked as chief analyst for the party from 2001 to 2002.

Krantz has served as a Member of Parliament since the 2006 election. In the parliament he was a member of the Committee on the Constitution and the War Delegation from 2002 to 2006. Since 2006 he is a member of the Committee on Health and Welfare and a deputy member of the Committee on Civil Affairs, Committee on Cultural Affairs, Committee on Social Insurance and the Committee on European Union Affairs. He is also a member of the board of the Liberal People's Party and a deputy member of board of Riksrevisionen.

Following Lars Leijonborg's decision to step down from the Swedish government, Krantz was appointed as new Minister for Higher Education and Research on 17 June 2009. Krantz left the government on 5 October 2010, following the 2010 election.

In 2016, he was appointed chairman of the Board of World Skills Sweden AB.

In 2017, he was elected chairman of the Board of WaterAid Sweden. Krantz is also a member of the board of this organization. Krantz is also a member of the board of Örebro University 2016–2017, a member of the 2015 school commission 2015–2017 and a member of the board of the research institute Ratio 2012–2017.

== Personal life ==
Tobias Krantz is married to Anna Grönlund Krantz, also a Liberal People's Party politician, with whom he has one child.

Political offices
Preceded by Lars Leijonborg	Minister for Higher Education and Research; 2009–2010	Succeeded by Jan Björklund
