= Hildur Nygren =

Swedish politician and teacher (1896–1962)

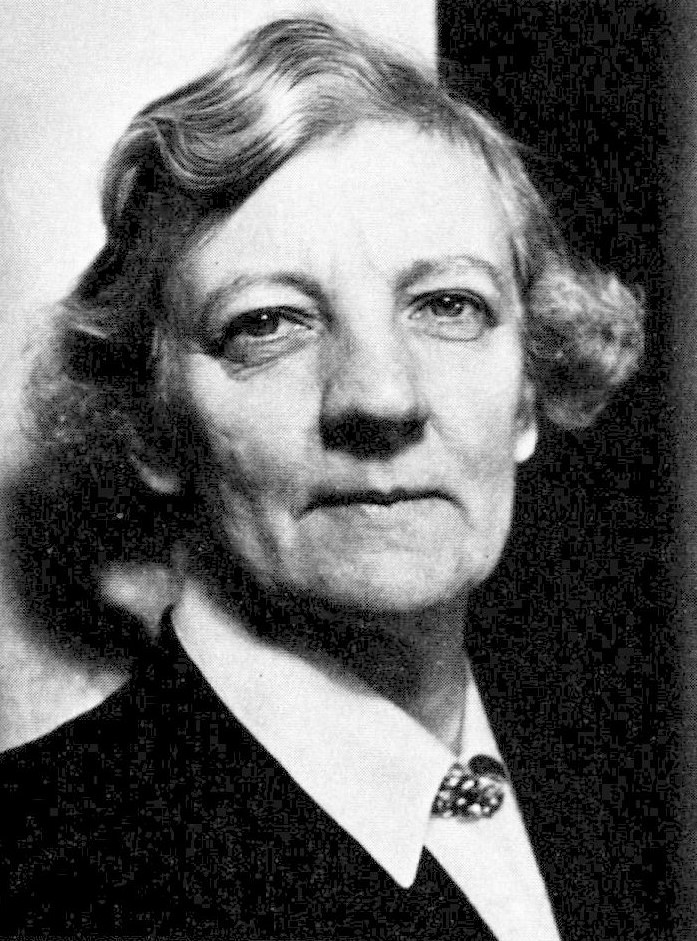

Member of the Riksdag
- In office 1941–1952

Personal details
- Born: Hildur Kristina Nygren; 22 March 1896 Gävle, Sweden
- Died: 24 April 1962 (aged 66) Lidingö, Sweden
- Political party: Swedish Social Democratic Party

Hildur Kristina Nygren (22 March 1896 – 24 April 1962) was a Swedish teacher and politician with the Social Democrats. She was elected as a member of the executive committee of the Gävle city council. She sat in the Riksdag from 1941 to 1952 and was the second female cabinet minister and the first female minister of education and ecclesiastical affairs in Sweden.

== Early life and education ==
Hildur Kristina Nygren was born on 22 March 1896 in Gävle and was the eldest of three children of Johanna Maria Bergström (1866–1936) and Gustaf Andersson Nygren (1868–1933). Both of her parents were involved in local politics and the Swedish Social Democratic Party, in addition to her father's job as a railway conductor. Nygren herself became involved in politics as a child, including helping to place posters. Eventually, her father was elected chair of Gävle town council as a Social Democrat.

After completing junior secondary school, she moved to Kalmar to attend a four year teaching training program. Upon completing the course, she returned to Gävle where she worked in Bönan hamlet as a teacher in addition to resuming her political activism with the Social Democrats.

== Career ==
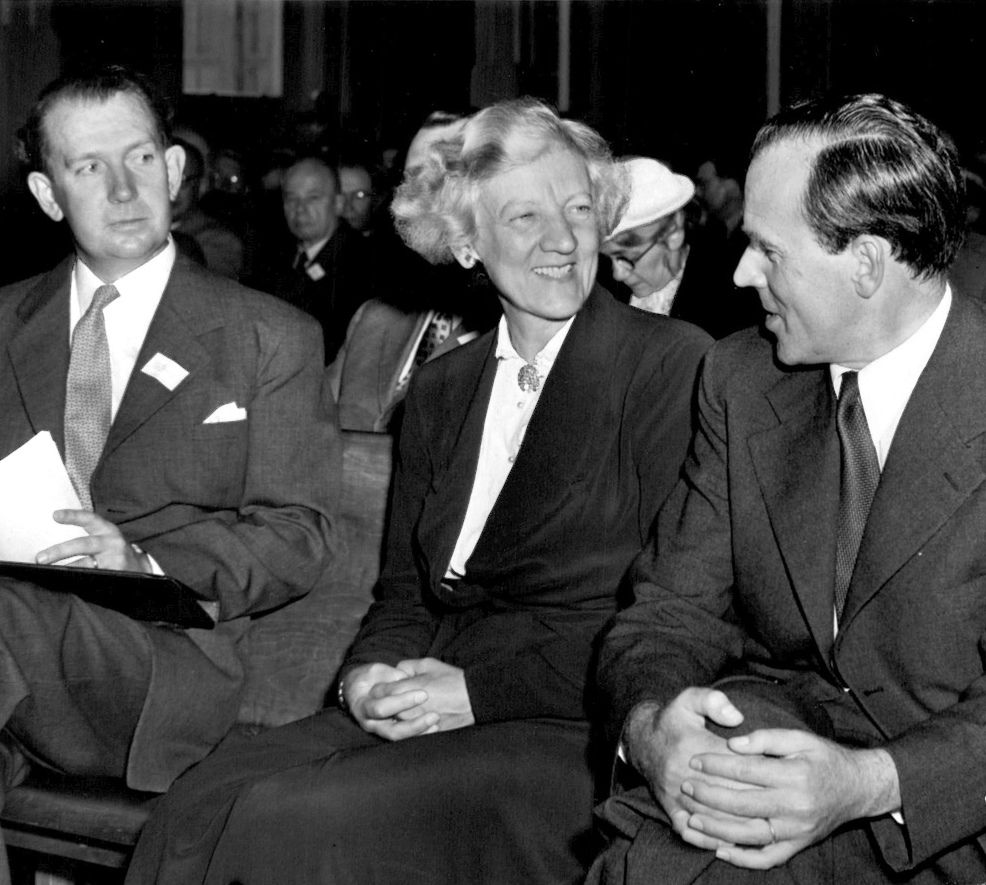
Teachers' Union Chairman Erik Nordell and Director General Nils Gustav Rosén with Hildur Nygren at a grammar school meeting in 1951

In 1939, Nygren was elected to the Gävle town council and became a member of its health authority, while continuing her teaching career. Two years later, she was elected into the second chamber of parliament. She focused her attention on advocating for free school meals and improving school health services. In 1941, she was appointed the Gävle district head teacher, becoming the first woman to hold that position.

In 1947, director of education Josef Weijne resigned and Nygren succeeded him in the role. After Weijne's unexpected death in 1951, Nygren was appointed minister of education and ecclesiastical affairs, following pressure from female members of the Social Democrats on the government to appoint a female minister. Nygren thus became the first woman to hold that post and the second female minister overall after Karin Kock-Lindberg. Her appointment proved controversial, with Sven Andersson, Nancy Eriksson and Östen Undén opposing her appointment. Later that year, the Social Democrat government entered into a coalition with Bondeförbundet party, who as part of the negotiations wanted Nygren's ministerial role. Prime Minister and leader of the Social Democrats, Tage Erlander, did not think highly of Nygren and used this as an opportunity to remove her from that position. After her removal, Nygren returned to her old position as director of education, where she particularly focused on supporting disabled children in education.

== Death ==
Nygren never married. She died on 24 April 1962 in Lidingö, at the age of 66.
