= Anders Örne =

Swedish politician (1881–1956)

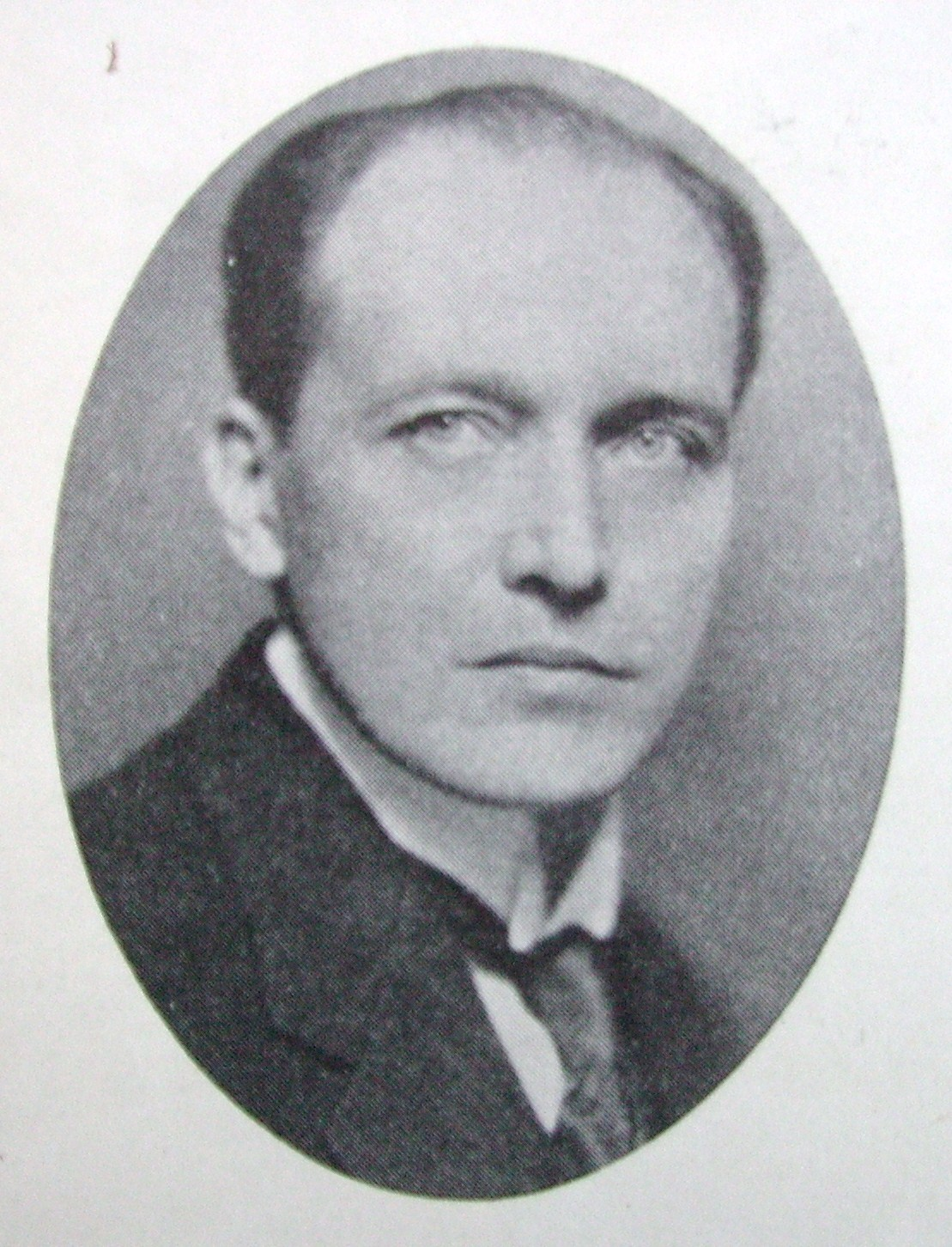
- Anders Örne while serving as the general director of the Post Office Administration in 1929

Minister of Communications (Transport)
- In office 1921–1923
- Prime Minister: Hjalmar Branting

Personal details
- Born: Anders Emmanuel Örne; 1881
- Died: 1956 (aged 74–75)
- Party: Social Democratic Party
- Education: Uppsala University

Anders Örne (1881–1956) was a Swedish politician who served as the minister of communications (transport) between 1921 and 1923. He also headed the Cooperative Society and Post Office Administration. In addition, he was a member of the Social Democratic Party.

== Biography ==
Örne was born in 1881. He received a bachelor's degree from Uppsala University. As of 1911 he was the editor of Kooperatören, a magazine published by the Swedish Cooperative Society. Later Örne became the secretary general of the Swedish Cooperative Society, and in 1918 he translated a document of the weavers cooperative in Rochdale which was the first cooperative to lay the foundations of these organizations in Sweden. The document included a number of principles of operating cooperatives, and Örne employed the seventh principle as the basis of the organization of the Swedish cooperatives with some adaptations. While serving in this post he was appointed minister of communications (transport) to the cabinet led by Prime Minister Hjalmar Branting in 1921. He was also a member of the Riksdag for the Social Democratic Party between 1919 and 1934. Then he served as the general director of the Post Office Administration in the period 1926–1946.

Örne was the author of various books mostly on cooperatives and advocated the idea of dual nationalism in his books which refers to the focus on individual countries in the Nordic region and also, on their common cultures and goals. One of his books on cooperatives was translated into English in 1926.

He died in 1956.
