= Lars Anton Anjou =

- Bishop of Visby
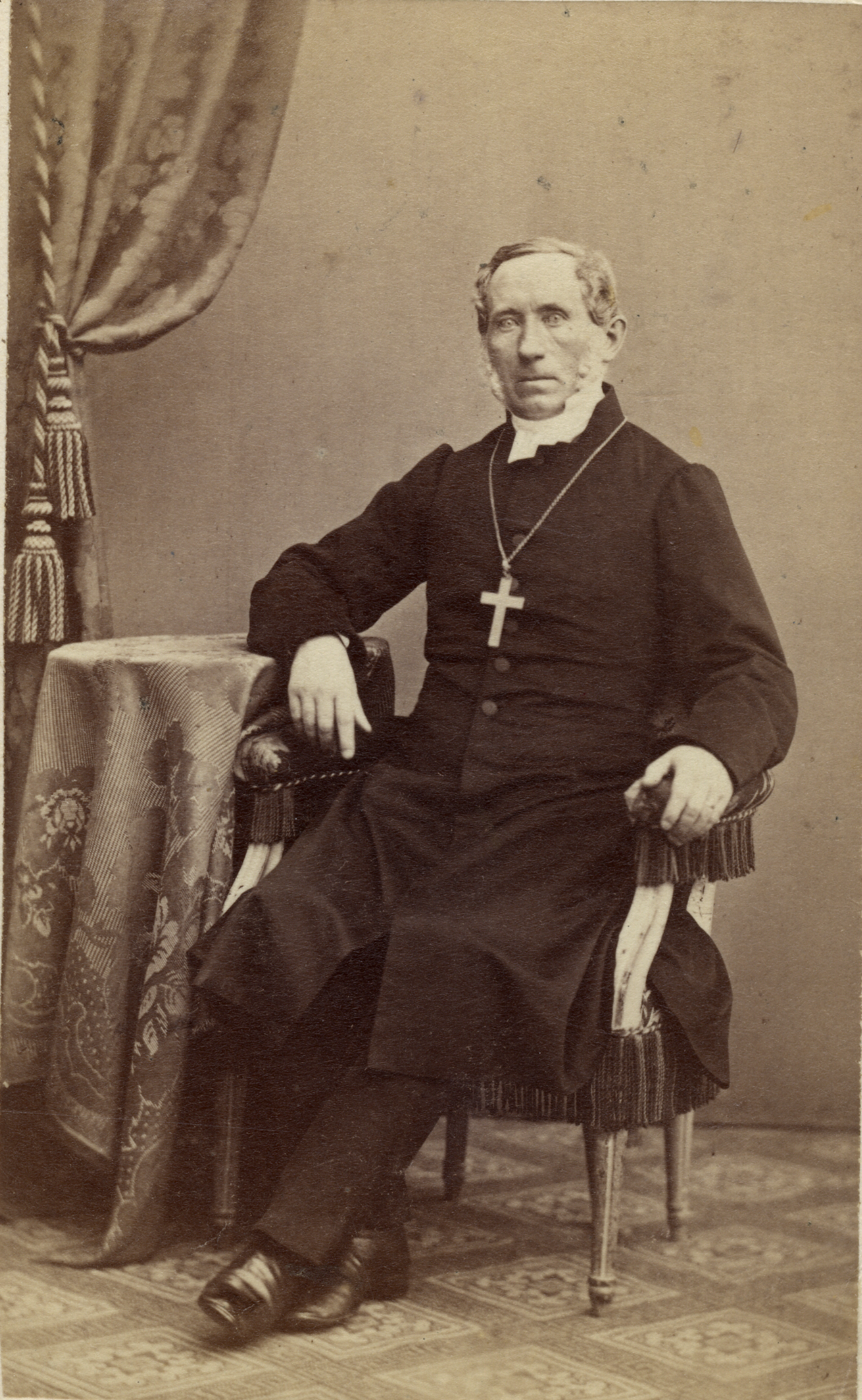
- Church: Church of Sweden
- Appointed: 1859
- In office: 1859-1884
- Predecessor: Carl Hallström
- Successor: Knut Henning Gezelius von Schéele

Orders
- Consecration: 25 March 1859 by Henrik Reuterdahl

Personal details
- Born: 18 November 1803 Frösthult, Sweden
- Died: 13 December 1884 (aged 81) Visby, Sweden
- Buried: Östra kyrkogården, Visby
- Parents: Anton Anjou; Johanna Elisabeth Sepelius

Lars Anton Anjou (18 November 1803 – 13 December 1884) was a Swedish bishop, church historian and politician.

== Biography ==
Anjou studied at Uppsala University, where he became a Bachelor of Philosophy in 1827, a Master of Philosophy in 1830, a Bachelor of Theology in 1834 and a Doctor of Theology in 1845. He was ordained a priest in 1827. In 1845, Anjou was appointed professor and pastor in the parish of Helga Trefaldighet, and in the parish of Denmark in 1851. In the academic year 1851–1852, he was rector of Uppsala University and was appointed minister of education and ecclesiastical affairs on 9 March 1855 as the successor of Henrik Reuterdahl. Among his achievements in this position is the reform of high school, in which he placed great emphasis on classical languages. He resigned as minister of education and ecclesiastical affairs on 29 January 1859.

Anjou was bishop of the Diocese of Visby from 1859 until his death. He was a member of the state assembly between the years 1859 and 1866.

Anjou, together with Henrik Reuterdahl, is considered to be the founder of church historiography in Sweden, primarily because of his long and influential account of the history of the Swedish Reformation. Among his works are Svenska kyrkoreformationens historia 1-3 (1850-51) and Svenska kyrkans historia ifrån Uppsala möte år 1593 till slutet af sjuttonde århundradet (1866).

He became a member of the Royal Swedish Academy of Sciences in 1855 and an honorary member of the Royal Swedish Academy of Letters, History and Antiquities the same year. The following year he became an honorary member of the Royal Society of Sciences in Uppsala. From 1853 he was a bearer of the Order of the Polar Star and in 1864 he was commander with the Grand Cross.

Lars Anton Anjou was the son of pastor Anton Anjou and Johanna Elisabeth Sepelius. The Anjou family is of Walloon origin, and came to Sweden in 1633. The name is today unknown in Wallonia, and probably the family took it only after arriving in Sweden; as far as is known, it has no connection to the French county of Anjou. Anjou is buried in the Östra kyrkogården in Visby.
