= Arthur Engberg =

Swedish politician (1888–1944)

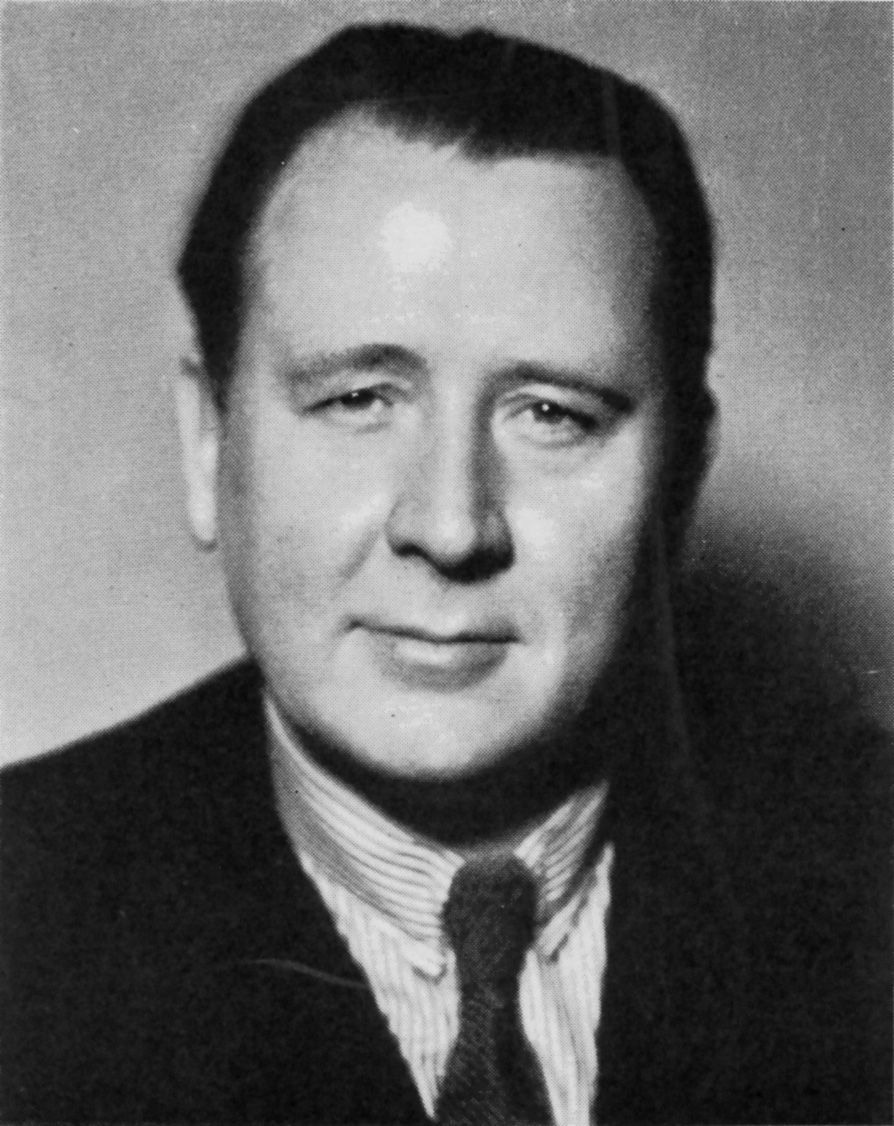
- Engberg, c. 1937

Member of the Riksdag
- In office 1917–1940

Minister of Education and Ecclesiastical Affairs
- In office 1932–1939

Personal details
- Born: Jonas Arthur Engberg; 11 January 1888 Hassela, Sweden
- Died: 27 March 1944 (aged 56) Härnösand, Sweden
- Party: Social Democratic
- Spouse: Lydia Carlsson (m. 1923)
- Education: Uppsala University
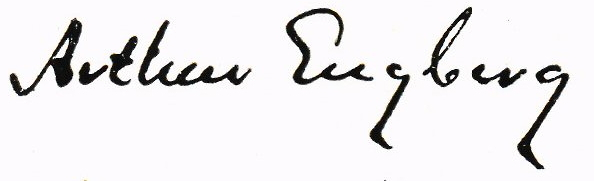
- Signature

Jonas Arthur Engberg (sv; (1 January 1888 – 27 March 1944), was a Swedish Social Democratic politician. He was a Member of the Riksdag 1917–1940, as well as minister of education and ecclesiastical affairs from September 1932 to June 1936, and from the autumn of 1936 until 1939. He was the chief editor of the Social Democratic daily Arbetet and campaigned against the legality of shechita (Jewish ritual slaughter) in Sweden, and was a supporter of the State Institute for Racial Biology.

Engberg was accused of antisemitism due to a 1921 editorial where he stated Judaism's nature was to be parasitic:

"It resembles these mysterious plants that lack roots in the soil, but live on the juice and spirit of other plants. Judaism has been and is the mistletoe on the Indo-Aryan race. It needs a noble race as a source of nutrition, and it would be unfair to deny that it has a clear eye for the best and the most viable. Thus the Jewish race has become the greatest exploiter in history."

In 1927, after moving to Stockholm, he stopped his anti-Jewish writings and later defended them and denounced Nazi Germany.
