= Nils Claëson =

Swedish politician (1848–1919)

Nils Ludvig Alfred Claëson
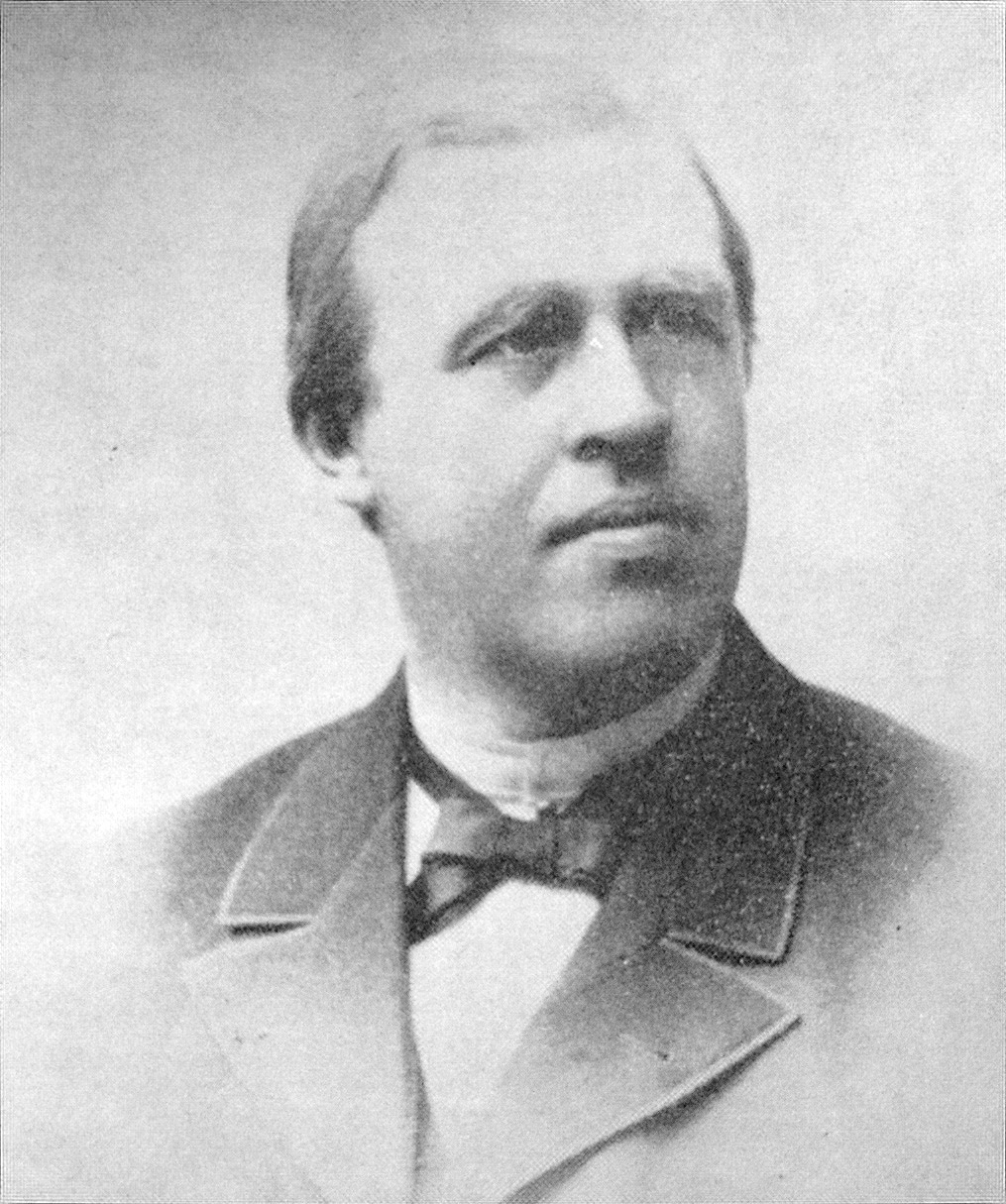
- Born: 15 November 1848; Botkyrka, Sweden
- Died: 7 January 1910 (aged 61); Stockholm, Sweden
- Burial place: Norra begravningsplatsen
- Education: Uppsala University
- Occupations: Politician, civil servant

Nils Ludvig Alfred Claëson (15 November 1848 – 7 January 1910) was a Swedish politician and civil servant.

Claëson was born at Lindhovs gård in present Botkyrka Municipality, Sweden. He graduated from Uppsala University and subsequently became an assessor at the Svea Court of Appeal in 1883 and as head of the Department of Ecclesiastics (the educational department at the time) in 1884. In 1889 he was elected Parliamentary Ombudsman and in 1892 he was appointed Supreme Court justice. In 1898, he was appointed Minister of Education and Ecclesiastical Affairs in Erik Gustaf Boström's government, a post he held until 1902. Claëson was also a member of the canon law committee in 1890 and a representative at the church assembly in 1898. He was president of Pro Fide et Christianismo, a Christian education society, from 1895 to 1899.

Claëson was married to Fransiska (Fanny) Eufemia Helleday, daughter of Johan David Helleday.

He was made a Commander Grand Cross in the Order of the Polar Star in 1899.

Claëson died in Stockholm in 1910 and is buried in Norra begravningsplatsen.
