= Karl Gustaf Westman =

Swedish historian and politician (1876–1944)

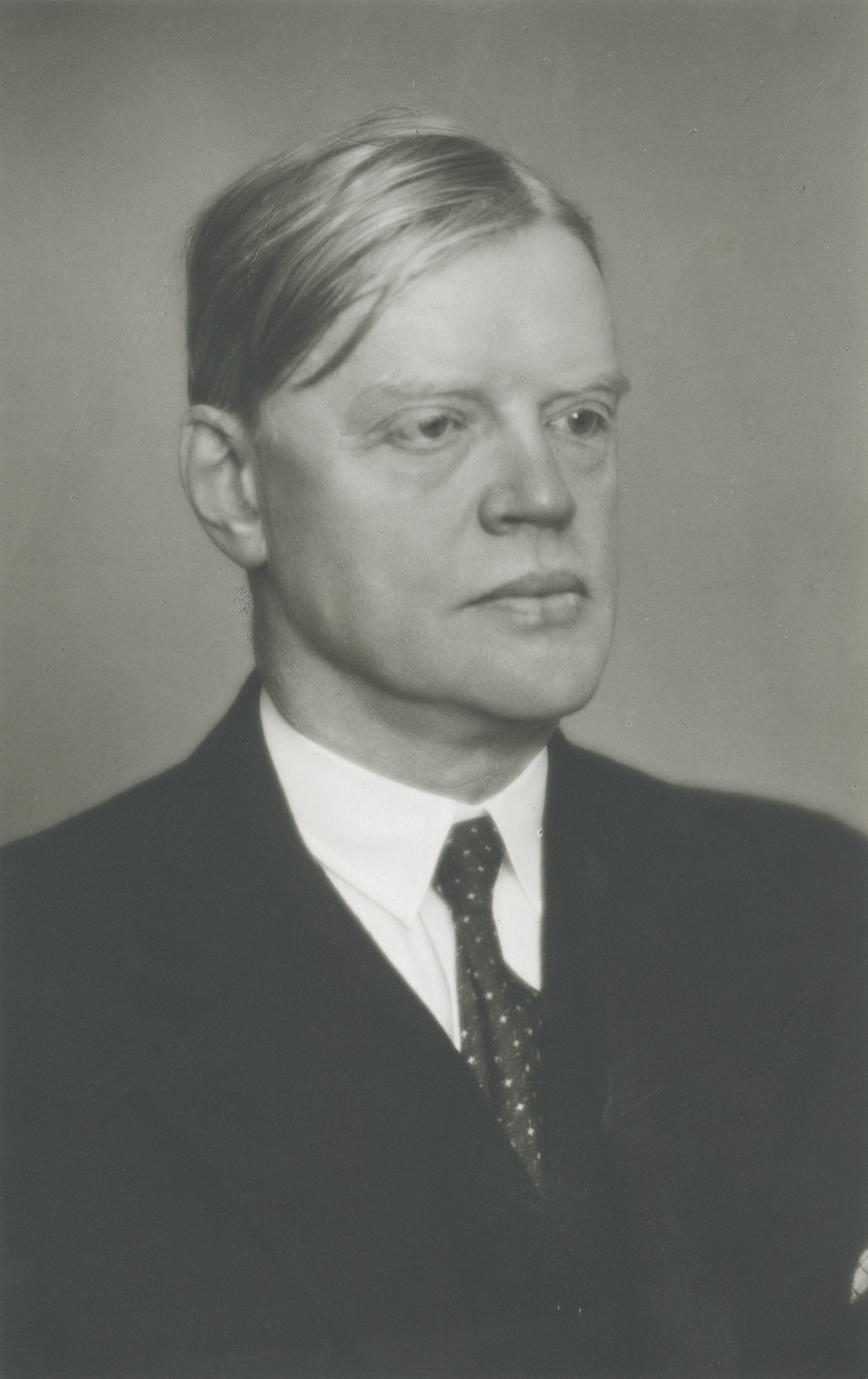

Minister of Justice
- In office 28 September 1936 – 30 August 1943
- Prime Minister: Per Albin Hansson
- Preceded by: Thorwald Bergquist
- Succeeded by: Thorwald Bergquist

Minister of Foreign Affairs
- In office 19 June 1936 – 28 September 1936
- Prime Minister: Axel Pehrsson-Bramstorp
- Preceded by: Rickard Sandler
- Succeeded by: Rickard Sandler

Minister of Education and Ecclesiastical Affairs
- In office 17 February 1914 – 30 March 1917
- Prime Minister: Hjalmar Hammarskjöld
- Preceded by: Fridtjuv Berg
- Succeeded by: Alexis Hammarström

Personal details
- Born: 18 August 1876 Gothenburg, Sweden
- Died: 24 January 1944 (aged 67) Stockholm, Sweden
- Party: Agrarian
- Spouse: Margit Printz
- Children: 3
- Occupation: Historian; Politician
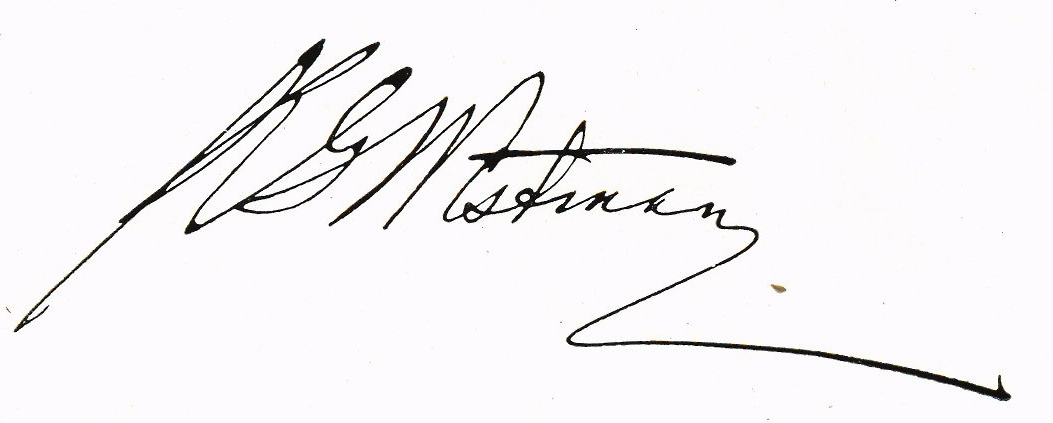
- Signature

Karl Gustaf Westman (18 August 1876 – 24 January 1944) was a Swedish historian and political leader.

== Biography ==
Westman attended Uppsala University, where he earned a bachelor's degree in 1897, Licentiate of Philosophy in 1904 and a Ph.D. 1905. He was professor of the History of Law in the faculty of law at Uppsala University (1910–1941).

In political office, he represented the Agrarian Bondeförbundet, which was established in 1913. He was minister of education and ecclesiastical affairs (1914–1917). He served as foreign minister (1936), and justice minister (1936–1943). Although not the chairman of his party, Westman was without doubt his party's most influential cabinet member.

As a justice minister, and as one of the cabinet members with a say in matters of foreign policy during World War II, Westman has been criticized for what some observers have perceived as exaggerated adaptation to Nazi Germany's expected victory in the war, and for a limited respect for the freedom of the press to criticize foreign powers.

== Personal life ==
Karl Gustaf Westman was the son of the postmaster Carl Johan Westman and Tonny (Andersson) Westman. He was the brother of the diplomat Karl Ivan Westman. He was married in 1935 to Margit Printz. Children: Ingun Margareta (born 1936), Sighild Margareta (born 1937) and Karl Joar (born 1939). Westman was buried on 2 February 1944 at Gamla kyrkogården in Uppsala.

== In popular culture ==
In the Swedish television movie Four days that shook Sweden - The Midsummer Crisis 1941, from 1988, he is played by Swedish actor Allan Svensson.
