= Lars Leijonborg =

Swedish politician (born 1949)

- Leijonborg in 2013

Minister for Higher Education and Research
- In office 12 September 2007 – 18 June 2009
- Prime Minister: Fredrik Reinfeldt
- Preceded by: Office established
- Succeeded by: Tobias Krantz

Minister for Education
- In office 6 October 2006 – 12 September 2007
- Prime Minister: Fredrik Reinfeldt
- Preceded by: Leif Pagrotsky
- Succeeded by: Jan Björklund

Leader of the Liberal People's Party
- In office 15 March 1997 – 7 September 2007
- Preceded by: Maria Leissner
- Succeeded by: Jan Björklund

Member of the Riksdag
- Incumbent
- Assumed office 28 September 2026
- Constituency: Malmö Municipality
- In office 15 September 1985 – 18 June 2009
- Constituency: Stockholm County

Personal details
- Born: 21 November 1949 (age 76) Täby, Sweden
- Party: Liberals (since 1968)
- Spouse: Lotta Edholm (m. 1992; div. 2004)
- Children: 2
- Education: Stockholm University
- Occupation: Sociologist • Politician

Lars Erik Ansgar Leijonborg (born 21 November 1949) is a Swedish sociologist and politician. He is also a member of the Riksdag since 2026. He was Minister for Higher Education and Research (2006–2009) and Minister of Education (2006–2007). During a ten-year period from 1997 to 2007, he served as chairman of the Liberal People's Party.

He announced on 11 June 2009 that he would be leaving the Cabinet of Fredrik Reinfeldt as soon as a successor was appointed. He was replaced by Tobias Krantz on 18 June 2009.

== Biography ==
Lars Leijonborg grew up in Solna north of Stockholm. In 1971 he became the leader of the Liberal Youth of Sweden (Liberala ungdomsförbundet), the Liberal Party's youth organisation. In 1974 he graduated from his studies in social work at Stockholm University. He was party secretary from 1980 to 1983 and editor-in-chief for the party magazine NU from 1983 to 1984. After a brief period as a management consultant, he was elected a member of the Riksdag (parliament) in 1985. In 1990 he became the party's second deputy chairman. Succeeding Maria Leissner, on 15 March 1997 he was unanimously elected chairman of the party.

In the 1998 parliamentary elections, Folkpartiet received 4.7% of the vote, just above the 4% threshold for parliamentary representation. It was the worst election result the party had seen since World War I. Even within the party, Leijonborg's position was questioned by many. The youth organisation he once headed openly called for his resignation. Despite the internal opposition, he managed to hold on to his position. And when, in the campaign before the 2002 parliamentary elections, the party suddenly surged after launching a proposal on making a Swedish language test one of the requirements for a naturalized Swedish citizenship, Leijonborg was nicknamed "the Lion King" (Leijonkungen) in the tabloids. The election result, 13.3%, was a success for the party and for Leijonborg personally, but since the party's centre-right partners failed to gain ground, the Social Democrats could remain in government. In 2006 the party was a part of the Alliance for Sweden, which won the election, although after a scandal where members of the party had hacked into a rival party's computer network, the Liberal Party lost almost six percentage points compared to the 2002 election, getting a total of 7.5% of the votes.

On 6 October 2006 Lars Leijonborg was made Minister for Education and Research in the Cabinet of Fredrik Reinfeldt. On 16 October 2006, Leijonborg temporarily took over the responsibilities for Minister for Culture Cecilia Stegö Chilò, who resigned that day. Eight days later, on 24 October, Lena Adelsohn Liljeroth assumed the post as Minister for Culture.

Leijonborg announced his resignation as party leader on 23 April 2007. He resigned from his post in September 2007. His successor as chairman, Minister for Schools Jan Björklund also took office as the new head of the Ministry of Education and Research. Leijonborg remained in the cabinet, keeping his political assignments as a minister for higher education and research but resigned from the government on 11 June 2009.

Leijonborg is a member of the congregationalist Mission Covenant Church of Sweden (Swedish: Svenska Missionskyrkan).

== Bibliography ==
- Liberal feminism (2001)
- Liberala perspektiv i svenskt samhällsliv : 1967, 2007 och 2017 (2007)

Party political offices
Preceded by Maria Leissner	Chairman of the Liberal People's Party; 1997–2007	Succeeded by Jan Björklund
Political offices
Preceded by Leif Pagrotsky; Minister for Education and Culture	Minister for Education and Research; 2006–2009	Succeeded by Tobias Krantz
