= National Progress Party =

National Progressive Party Nationella framstegspartiet
- Leader: Hans Andersson in Nöbbelöv
- Founded: 1906
- Dissolved: 1912
- Split from: Lantmanna Party
- Succeeded by: Farmer and Bourgeoisie Party
- Headquarters: Stockholm
- Ideology: Liberal conservatism
- Political position: Centre-right
- Colors: Blue

The National Progressive Party (Swedish: Nationella framstegspartiet) was a moderate conservative party in the second chamber which was formed in 1906 by a breakaway from Lantmanna Party. The Chairman was Hans Andersson i Nöbbelöv.

National Progress Party's goal was to unite the rural and urban common interests in a better way than in the rural areas dominated Lantmanna Party. The number of MPs was 42 at the foundation, but fell gradually to 30 years 1911. After the Second Chamber elections in 1911 rejoined the party in 1912 with Lantmanna Party under the new name Farmer and Bourgeoisie Party, which came to be called the second chamber right. National Progressive Party is thus one of the Moderate Party's historical predecessor.
