= Olof Olsson (1872–1939) =

Swedish politician

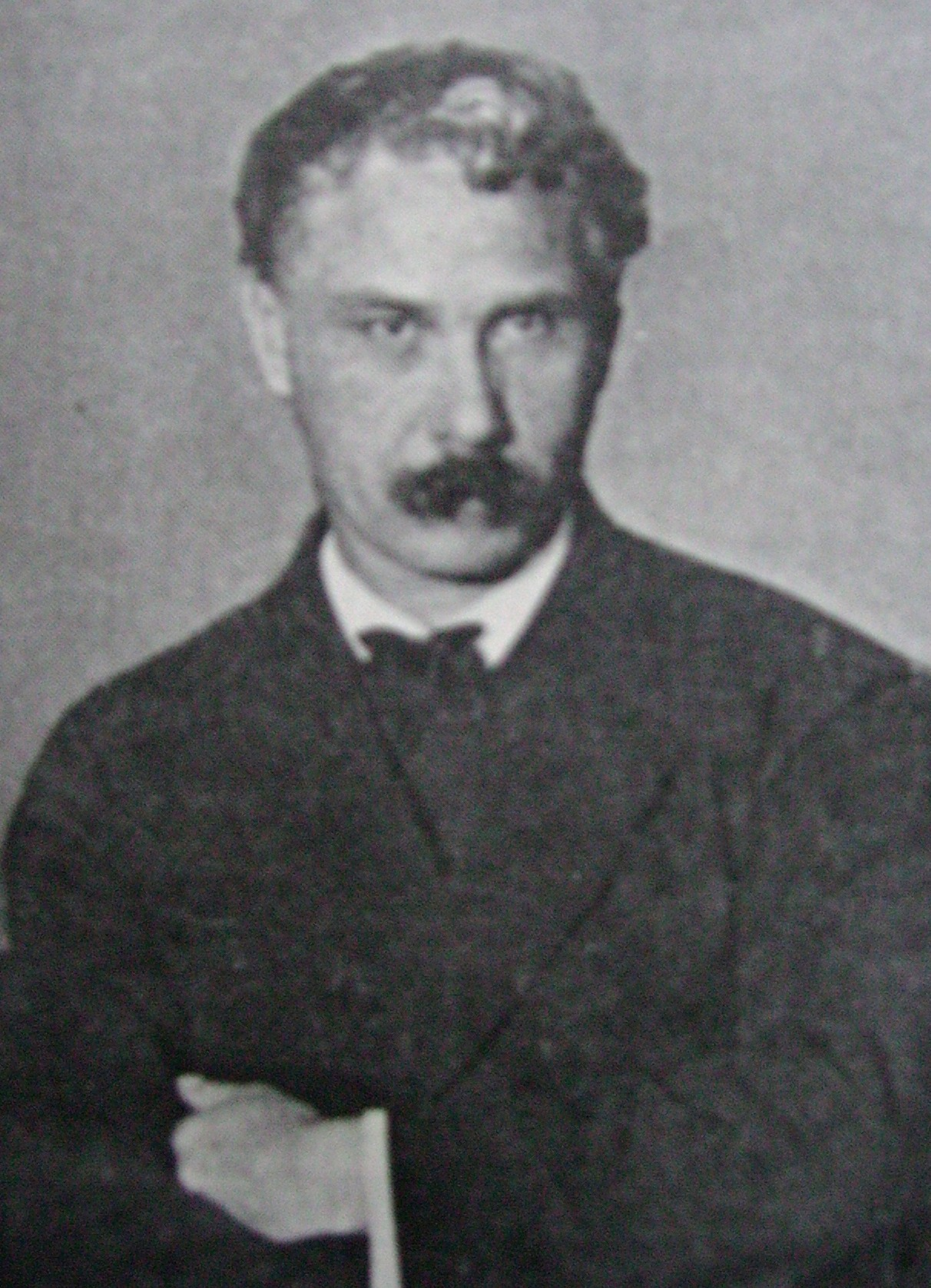
- Born: 18 June 1872
- Died: 18 December 1939 (aged 67)
- Occupation: politician
- Children: Jan-Erik Garland

Olof Olsson (18 June 1872 – 18 December 1939) was a Swedish Social Democratic politician. He served as minister of education and ecclesiastical affairs during several periods (1919–1920, 1921–1923 and 1924–1926).

He was the father of cartoonist and journalist Jan-Erik Garland.
