= Fridtjuv Berg =

Swedish politician (1851–1916)

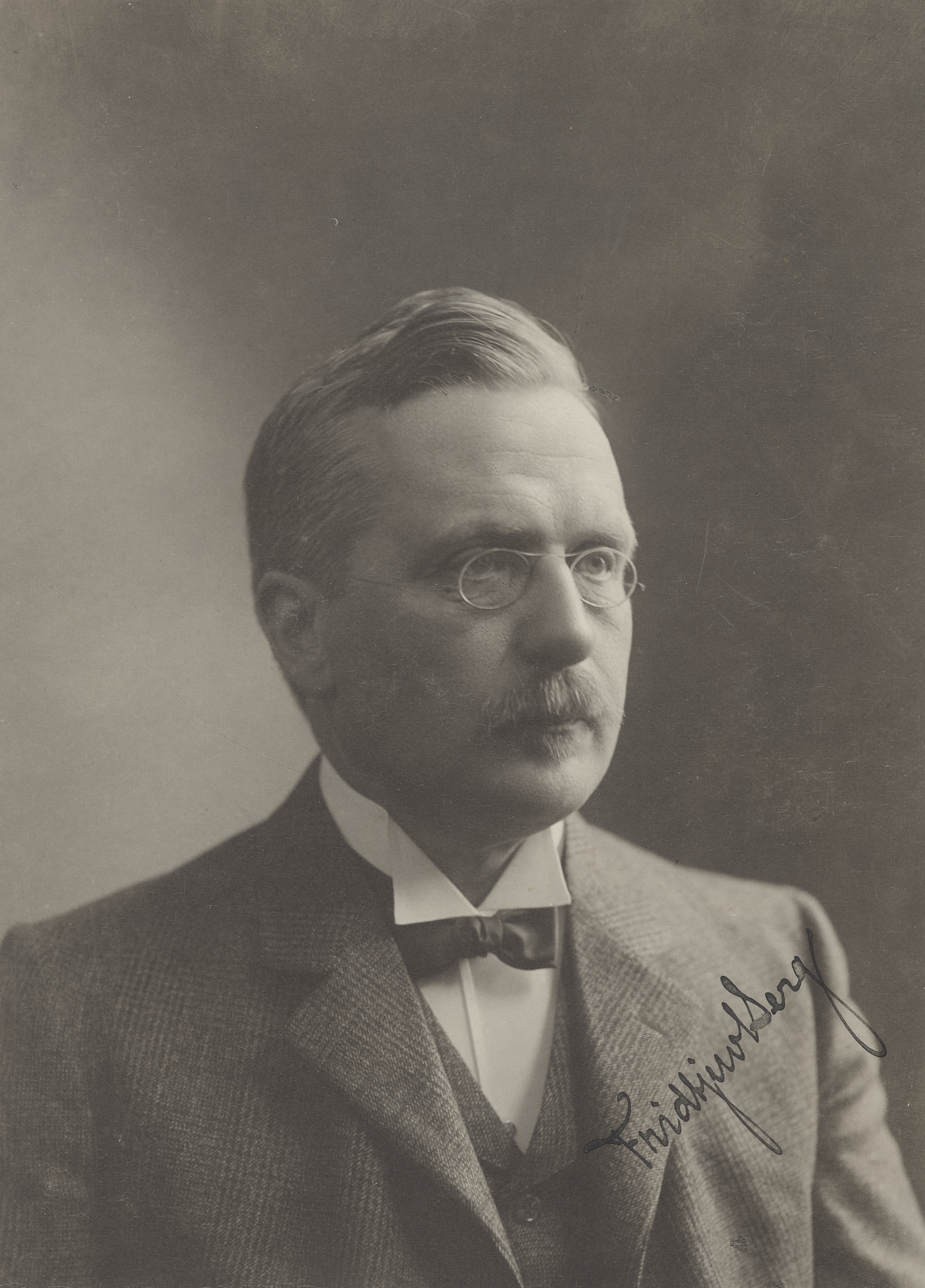
- Fridtjuv Berg, 1916.

Minister of Education and Ecclesiastical Affairs
- In office 1905–1906
- Preceded by: Hjalmar Hammarskjöld
- Succeeded by: Hugo Hammarskjöld
- In office 1911–1914
- Preceded by: Elof Lindström
- Succeeded by: Karl Gustaf Westman

Member of Parliament (City of Stockholm)
- In office 1891–1916
- Succeeded by: Allan Cederborg

Personal details
- Born: Johan Fridtjuv Berg; 20 March 1851
- Died: 29 February 1916 (aged 64)
- Resting place: Norra Begravningsplatsen; 59.3562°N 18.0205°E
- Party: Liberal (Independent)
- Relations: Anders Berg (father)
- Children: Yngve Berg
- Occupation: Politician

Johan Fridtjuv Berg (20 March 1851 – 29 February 1916) was a Swedish school teacher, author, and politician (liberal); he was minister of education and ecclesiastical affairs from 1905 to 1906 and 1911 to 1914 and Member of Parliament from 1891 to 1916. Berg was the son of educator Anders Berg and father of historian Tor Berg and artist Yngve Berg.

== Biography ==
Johan Fridtjuv Berg was born 20 March 1851 in Ödeshögs parish, Östergötland county, Sweden. Berg's father had been a principal at a school in Finspång since 1851. Berg succeeded him in 1878 and remained in the post until 1881. In 1883, Berg wrote the book Folkskolan såsom bottenskola ('The Folk School as a Basic School') in which he advocated a school system where there was only one type of school for all social classes. Berg was a Member of Parliament (Riksdag) in the second chamber for the city of Stockholm from 1891 to 1911 and for Stockholm's first constituency from 1912 to 1916. In parliament, he belonged to the Gamla lantmannapartiet ('Old Party of the Rural People') from 1891 to 1894, but in 1895 he helped to form the People's Party (Folkpartiet), which in 1900 merged into the Liberal Coalition Party (Liberala samlingspartiet). Having previously spoken out only on educational and general humanitarian issues, he began to take an active part in political struggles in 1905. After the dissolution of the Union between Norway and Sweden, he spoke out firmly against any violent intervention in the conflict between. As a result, he was opposed by the right and some right-liberals in the 1905 autumn elections.

When Karl Staaff formed a government on 7 November 1905, with the aim of reforming the electoral system based on majority representation, Berg became minister of education and ecclesiastical affairs. As prime minister, he succeeded in enacting a number of changes that were important for public education and general culture. He was responsible for the Swedish spelling reform of 1906, which abolished the spellings hv- for anlaut /v/ in standard Swedish spelling, -fv- for inlaut /v/, -f for auslaut /v/ and -dt for auslaut /t/. He also pushed through changes to the representation of the public school teaching profession on local school boards and state grants to fiction writers. On May 29, 1906, the entire government resigned. Berg took a very active part in the political agitation of the summer and autumn of 1906, defending both in speech and in writing the general policy of the Staaff ministry and its electoral proposals. The Lindman voting proposal was opposed by Berg both in lectures in various parts of the country and in the parliamentary debates in the spring of 1907.

After the proposal for proportional representation was finally adopted by Parliament, he, like Staaff, took the view that the dispute between proportional representation and majority representation should be allowed to rest. On parliamentarism, defense and temperance, the three major issues of 1909–1911, Berg was fully in line with Staaff and, like Staaff, was a supporter of Second Chamber parliamentarism and of investigations into defense and the public position on the liquor trade. Berg's work as minister of education and ecclesiastical affairs was widely appreciated. He was one of the leaders in Swedish liberal education policy and school policy of his time. With the support of male teachers, he submitted a bill for different salary scales according to gender for publicly employed elementary school teachers.

"Male and female teachers may do the same amount of work – and certainly just as valuable work, but they certainly do not do the same kind of work."

— Fridtjuv Berg

The proposal went through in 1906.

Berg was also one of the founders of the Saga Children's Library.

In 1883 he married Vilhelmina Dorotea Kåberg (1858–1921), daughter of blacksmith Per Adolf Kåberg. Berg died 29 February 1916 in Kungsholm, Stockholm, Sweden. His grave can be found in Norra begravningsplatsen.

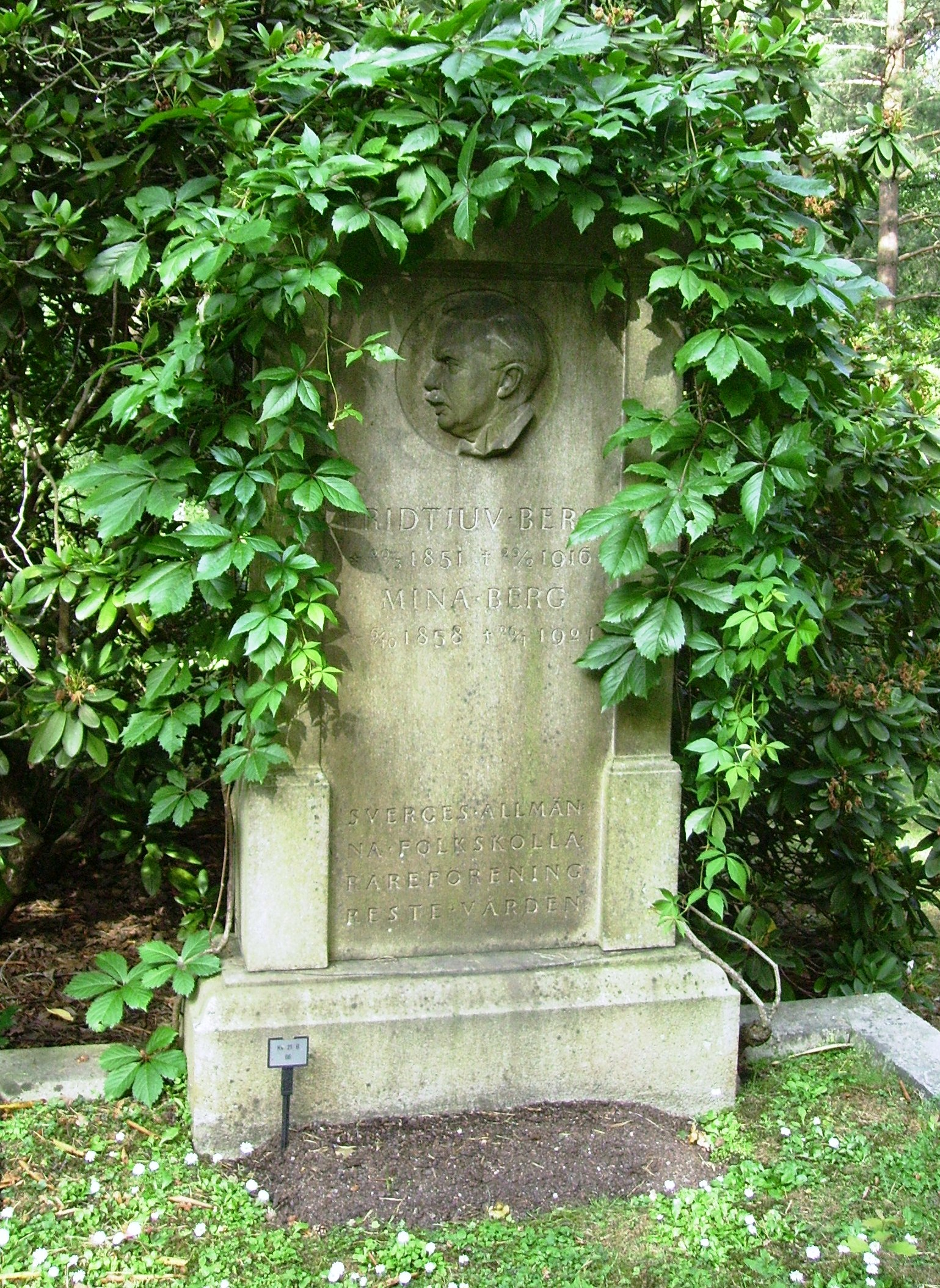
Gravestone of Fridtjuv Berg, Norra Begravningsplatsen, Sweden
