= Ministry of Education and Ecclesiastical Affairs =

- Ecklesiastikdepartementet
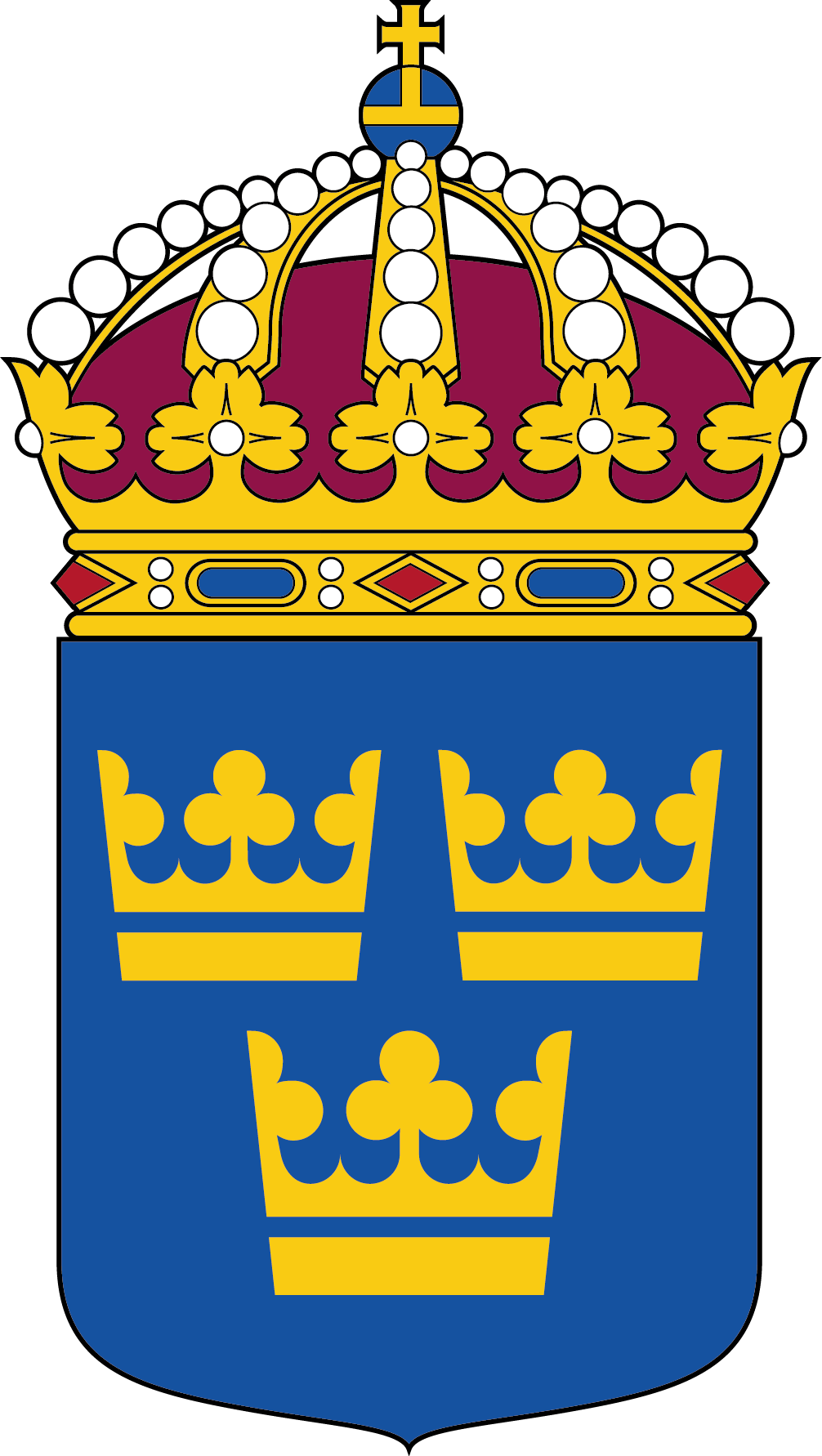

Ministry of religious affairs overview
- Formed: 16 May 1840
- Dissolved: 31 December 1967
- Superseding Ministry of religious affairs: Ministry of Education and Cultural Affairs
- Headquarters: Mynttorget 2, Stockholm, Sweden
- Minister responsible: Minister of Education and Ecclesiastical Affairs
- Parent agency: Royal Chancery

The Ministry of Education and Ecclesiastical Affairs (Swedish: Ecklesiastikdepartementet) was a ministry in Sweden established in 1840. The ministry dealt with matters concerning the church, education, science, culture, medical and general health care as well as poorhouses. The ministry was headed by the minister of education and ecclesiastical affairs. The ministry changed its name on 31 December 1967 to the Ministry of Education and Cultural Affairs (today's Ministry of Education and Research).

== History ==
In earlier times, there was no particularly central body for ecclesiastical affairs within the Swedish state administration. A large part of these cases were decided by the bishops and consistories and in the parliament. Attempts by the reign of Gustavus Adolphus, Christina's guardian, and the Age of Liberty to establish a special central board of administration for the church and the educational institutions, the so-called Consistorium ecclesiasticum generale, failed as a result of opposition from the clergy. The chancellery order (kansliordningen) of 22 September 1661 placed ecclesiastical affairs under the Kanslikollegium; but many questions, especially matters of promotion, were still decided by the cathedral chapters, while the clergy gathered at the Riksdag's, under the name of the Riksconsitorium (Consistorium regni), without statutory right exercised the highest authority in several matters concerning the church, above all in matters of a judicial nature.

This self-assumed power of the clergy was abolished by Charles XI. By Charles XII's chancellery order of 26 October 1713, ecclesiastical matters were placed under the Handelsexpeditionen ("Trade Office") and were reported to the king by the head of this agency or ombudsråd. But after Charles XII's death, they came again, according to the chancellery orders of 29 May 1719 and 14 June 1720, to be treated by the Kanslikollegium and were presented by the state secretary at the Inrikesexpeditionen ("Home Office"). During this time, purely ecclesiastical administrative issues were also (strangely enough) sometimes dealt with within the Justitierevisionen. In 1786, Gustav III separated the clerical promotion issues from the Civilexpeditionen ("Civil Office") and handed over their report to a so-called Ecclesiastical Committee (Ecklesiastikberedning). In 1789 he introduced a special office for ecclesiastical matters in general, the Ecklesiastikexpeditionen ("Ecclesiastical Office"), but this was abolished in 1793, after which such matters were reported by the state secretary of the Civilexpeditionen until 1809, when — according to the chancellery order of 23 October of the same year — a special Ecclesiastical Office was again established. At the introduction of the ministerial board (departementalstyrelsen), in 1840, this office was named the Ministry of Education and Ecclesiastical Affairs.

According to the royal charter of 31 March 1900 regarding the distribution of matters between the state ministries, with amendments of 30 January 1903 and 30 September 1904, matters relating to church affairs, the exercise of the priesthood, the clergy's and church service's salary rights and calculation of years of service, construction and maintenance of the church and parsonage were added to the ecclesiastical ministry; foundations and institutions for the sciences, general education and teaching with the exception partly of those belonging to the military, partly also of the special schools for the trades, which according to the said statute belong to another ministry; establishing, revoking, changing or explaining such municipal constitutions, which refer to the church or educational system; foundations and institutions for learnedness and fine arts; The National Archives and regional archives (landsarkiv); public libraries, academies and museums with the exception of those relating to land defence, naval defence or industries; foundations which does not accrue under another ministry, authority or institution.

In 1907, the ministry was divided into three offices: one for church matters, one for matters concerning higher education, the national and regional archives, the National Library, academies, etc. and one for matters concerning public education. The head of the ministry bore the title "cabinet minister and the head of the royal ministry of education and ecclesiastical affairs", but in everyday speech was usually called the minister of education and ecclesiastical affairs. Other officials were: one director general for administrative affairs (expeditionschef), three deputy directors (kansliråd) and director (byråchef), six administrative officers (kanslisekreterare), a registrar and a number of amanuenses (extra ordinary officials). One of the administrative officers was required to, under the supervision of the relevant deputy director, process statistical information regarding the teaching system and otherwise keep the statistical notes necessary for accurate knowledge of it. At the same time, it required the administrative officer, whom the Royal Majesty appointed for that purpose, to prepare for presentation, on his own responsibility, the state regulations concerning matters concerning higher education, which would be submitted to the Riksdag. At the beginning of the 20th century, the number of ordinary officials and civil servants as well as other people, who were employed in the ministry with its subordinate central boards and agencies, amounted to over 23,000 people, of which in 1906 around 800 belonged to central boards and agencies, universities and colleges etc., 2,859 the clergy, 1,188 public schools, 18,274 public schools and primary schools.

In the early 1950s, the ministry dealt with administrative matters concerning the church system, the parish board and the ecclesiastical municipality in general, archives, libraries and museums, literature and fine arts, theater, universities, colleges and schools, general public education, vocational education, cinemas and education statistics. Its organization did not deviate from that usual for state ministries. Under the head of ministry, the minister of education and ecclesiastical affairs, there was a state secretary, one director general for administrative affairs, one rapporteur in the Supreme Administrative Court and two directors. In addition, there were four deputy directors at the head of the respective church, academy, secondary school and public school offices.

The ministry changed its name on 31 December 1967 to the Ministry of Education and Cultural Affairs (today's Ministry of Education and Research).

== Central boards and agencies ==
In 1907, among other things, the following central boards and agencies (centrala ämbetsverk) belonged to the ministry: the National Archives, the National Library, the National Antiquarian (riksantikvarien), the State Herald, the National Museum, Överstyrelsen för rikets allmänna läroverk ("National [Swedish] Board for the General Secondary Schools"), the ecclesiastical service (except in the army and navy), universities, Karolinska Institute, Stockholm University College, Gothenburg University College, general secondary schools, the Royal Advanced Female Teachers' Seminary, public schools, technical schools, Royal Central Gymnastics Institute, Serafimerlasarettet, the Royal Pharmaceutical Institute (Farmaceutiska institutet), educational institutions for midwives, regional archives (landsarkiv), the Swedish Academy, the Royal Swedish Academy of Sciences, the Royal Swedish Academy of Letters, History and Antiquities, the Royal Swedish Academy of Fine Arts, the Royal Swedish Academy of Music, the Royal Society for the Publication of Manuscripts concerning Scandinavian History (Samfundet för utgivande av handskrifter rörande Skandinaviens historia), the Royal Society of Sciences in Uppsala, the Royal Physiographic Society in Lund, the Royal Society of Arts and Sciences in Gothenburg, the Royal Society of the Humanities at Uppsala, the Nobel Foundation, the executive boards of the public school teachers' pension institution (Direktionerna över folkskollärarnas pensionsinrättning), Lärarnas vid elementarläroverken änke- och pupillkassa ("The elementary school teachers' widows' and orphans' fund") and the clergy's widows' and orphans' fund (prästerskapets änke- och pupillkassa) as well as the most public charities and pious foundations.

In 1967, among other things, the following central boards and agencies belonged to the ministry: the National Archives, the Swedish National Heraldic Board (Statens heraldiska nämnd), the National Library, the Swedish National Heritage Board, the National Museum, the Museum of Far Eastern Antiquities, the Royal Armoury, the Museum of Natural History, the Museum of Ethnography, the Office of the Chancellor of the Swedish Universities (Universitetskanslersämbetet), the Planning and Equipment Board for the Swedish Universities and Colleges (Utrustningsnämnden för universitet och högskolor), the National [Swedish] Board of Education (Skolöverstyrelsen) and the Swedish National Commission for Unesco (Svenska unescorådet).

== Location ==
Until 1967, the ministry was located in Kanslihuset at Mynttorget 2 in Stockholm.

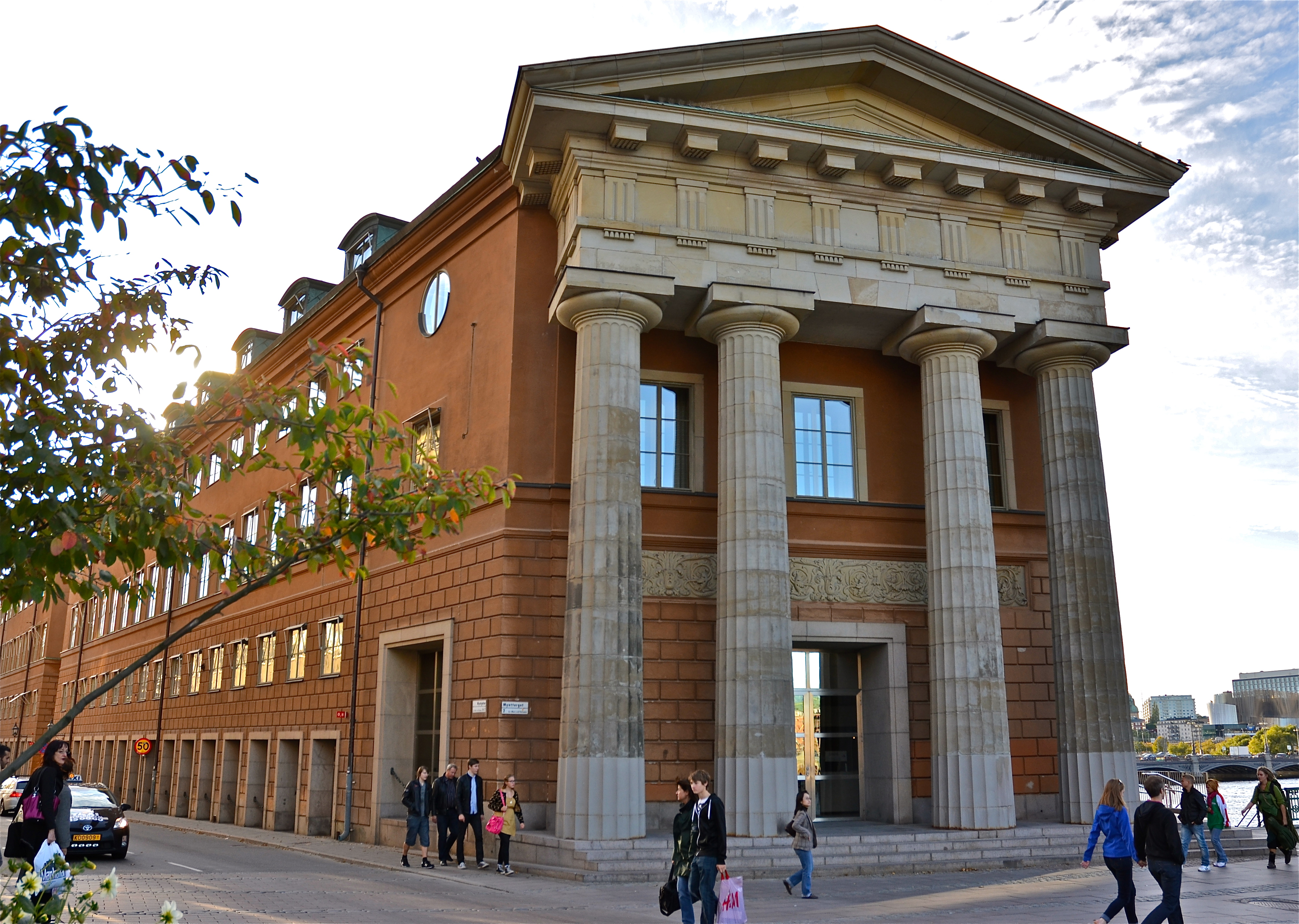
Mynttorget 2

== See also ==
- Minister of Education and Ecclesiastical Affairs
