= Elof Lindström =

Swedish javelin thrower

Karl Elof Lindström (17 December 1897 – 29 November 1988) was a Swedish athlete who competed in the 1920 Summer Olympics. He was born and died in Eksjö and was the younger brother of Gunnar Lindström. In 1920, he finished 13th in the javelin throw event.
