= Ministry of Education and Research (Sweden) =

Government ministry of Sweden

Coordinates: 59°19′47.89″N 18°03′55.49″E

- Utbildningsdepartementet

Agency overview
- Formed: 1968
- Preceding agency: Ministry of Education and Ecclesiastical Affairs
- Employees: 217 (2024)
- Annual budget: SEK 264 million (2025)
- Ministers responsible: Simona Mohamsson, Head of the Ministry Minister for Education; Lotta Edholm, Minister for Upper Secondary School, Higher Education and Research
- Parent agency: Government Offices (Note: Before 1 January 1975, the Government Offices was called the Royal Chancery.)
- Website: government.se/government-of-sweden/ministry-of-education-and-research

The Ministry of Education and Research (Swedish: Utbildningsdepartementet) is a government ministry in Sweden responsible for matters relating to schools, universities, colleges, and research.

Before 1968, the ministry was called the Ministry of Education and Ecclesiastical Affairs.

The ministry offices are located at Drottninggatan 16 in central Stockholm.

== Organization ==
The Ministry of Education and Research has a staff of 200. The head of the ministry is the Minister for Education, currently Simona Mohamsson (L).

== Areas of responsibility ==
- Education and research

== Government agencies ==
The Ministry of Education and Research is principal to the following government agencies:

Schools, children and youth

- National Agency for Education, or (Skolverket)
- Schools Inspectorate (Skolinspektionen)
- Agency for Special Needs Education and Schools (Specialpedagogiska skolmyndigheten)
- Sami Education Board (Sameskolstyrelsen)
- Board of Appeal for Education (Skolväsendets överklagandenämnd)

Higher education

- Public universities and colleges
- Council for Higher Education, or (Universitets- och högskolerådet)
- Board of Student Finance, or (Centrala studiestödsnämnden)
- Higher Education Appeals Board (Överklagandenämnden för högskolan)
- National Board of Appeal for Student Aid (Överklagandenämnden för studiestöd)
- Office of the Chancellor of the Swedish Universities (Universitetskanslersämbetet)
- Agency for Higher Vocational Education (Myndigheten för yrkeshögskolan)

Research

- Institute of Space Physics, or (Institutet för rymdfysik)
- National Library, or (Kungliga biblioteket)
- Polar Research Secretariat, or (Polarforskningssekretariatet)
- Space Agency, or (Rymdstyrelsen)
- Research Council, or (Vetenskapsrådet)
- Institute for Educational Research (Skolforskningsinstitutet)
- Royal Academy of Science (Kungliga Vetenskapsakademie)
- Ethical Review Authority (Etikprövningsmyndigheten)

== Ministers for Higher Education and Research ==
| No. | Portrait | Minister (Born–Died) | Tenure | | | Political party | Cabinet |
| No. | Portrait | Minister (Born–Died) | Took office | Left office | Duration | Political party | Cabinet |
|---|---|---|---|---|---|---|---|
| 1 | | Lars Leijonborg (born 1949) | 12 September 2007 | 17 June 2009 | 1 year, 278 days | Liberal People's | Reinfeldt; M—C—FP—KD |
| 2 | | Tobias Krantz (born 1971) | 17 June 2009 | 5 October 2010 | 1 year, 110 days | Liberal People's | Reinfeldt; M—C—FP—KD |
Following the 2010 election, the minister post was abolished and the portfolio overtaken by the Minister for Education.
| 4 | | Helene Hellmark Knutsson (born 1969) | 3 October 2014 | 21 January 2019 | 4 years, 110 days | Social Democrats | Löfven I S—MP |
| 5 | | Matilda Ernkrans (born 1973) | 21 January 2019 | 30 November 2021 | 2 years, 313 days | Social Democrats | Löfven II; S—MP; Löfven III; S—MP |
The minister post was abolished in the Andersson Cabinet and the portfolio overtaken by the Minister for Education.
| 6 | | Lotta Edholm (born 1965) | 28 June 2025 | | 1 year, 72 days | Liberals | Kristersson; M—KD—L |
