= Hammarskjöld =

Hammarskjöld is a Swedish surname.

== People ==
Notable people with the surname Hammarskjöld include:

- Agnes Hammarskjöld (née Almqvist; 1866–1940), wife of Hjalmar and mother of Åke and Dag
- Åke Hammarskjöld (1893–1937), civil servant and diplomat, son of Agnes and Hjalmar, brother of Dag and grandfather of Elinor
- Carl Gustaf Hammarskjöld (1865–1940), politician (1920–1921), brother of Hjalmar and cousin of Hugo
- Dag Hammarskjöld (1905–1961), Secretary-General of the United Nations, son of Agnes and Hjalmar and brother of Åke
- Elinor Hammarskjöld (born 1967), lawyer and diplomat, granddaughter of Åke
- Emilie Hammarskjöld (née Holmberg; 1821–1854), musician
- Hjalmar Hammarskjöld (1862–1953), Prime Minister of Sweden, brother of Carl Gustaf, cousin of Hugo, husband of Agnes and father of Åke and Dag
- Hugo Hammarskjöld (1845–1937), politician (1906–1909), cousin of Hjalmar and Carl Gustaf

=== Variants ===
- Eva Hamilton (née Hammarskiöld; born 1954), journalist and great-granddaughter of Ludvig
- Hans Hammarskiöld (1925–2012), photographer, grandson of Ludvig
- Carl Jacob Hammarsköld (1833−1884), ironmaster, army officer and railwayman
- Lorenzo Hammarsköld (1785–1827), author, great-uncle of Ludbig, Hugo, Hjalmar and Carl Gustaf
- Ludvig Hammarskiöld (1869–1949), general, cousin of Hjalmar, grandfather of Hans and great-grandfather of Eva

== Places ==
- Dag Hammarskjöld Crash Site Memorial, a site in Ndola, Zambia
- Dag Hammarskjöld Plaza, a park in New York City, United States of America
- One Dag Hammarskjöld Plaza, a building in New York City

== Other ==
- Cold Case Hammarskjöld, a 2019 documentary film
- Hammarskjöld, a 2023 film
- Dag Hammarskjöld Foundation, a Swedish non-governmental organisation
- Dag Hammarskjöld Library, a library at the headquarters of the United Nations

== See also ==
- Hammarskjold
- Hammarskjöld family
- Hammerskjoeld Simwinga, Zambian environmentalist
