= Hammarskjöld family =

Swedish noble family

Hammarskjöld
- Swedish noble family
- Country: Sweden
- Founder: Peder Mikaelsson Hammarskjöld

Portrait photograph of Agnes Hammarskjöld, circa 1907 or 1908

The Hammarskjöld family (also spelled -skiöld) is a Swedish noble family. They are enrolled in Riddarhuset (The House of Nobility) with the number of 135.

== Background ==
The founder of the family was Peder Mikaelsson (c. 1560–1646), the Governor of Borgholm Castle. He fought for King Sigismund at Stångebro in 1598 and was knighted in 1610 with the name of Hammarskiöld. He was married twice. His first wife was Beata Körning, daughter of the slottslov ("castle commander") Erik Matsson Körning and Kjerstin Hand. His second wife, a cousin of Beata, was Christina Stjerna, the daughter of Peder Månsson Stjerna (number 77 in Riddarhuset) and Karin Hand. The two marriages produced children but the issue from his first wife went out early on the "sword side" (svärdssidan, literally "on the side of the sword" meaning without any male heirs).

As early as 1607 Peder Mikaelsson Hammarskiöld received as his properties the manors in the present Oskarshamn Municipality – Misterhult, Virbo and Fårbo – and, in the present Vimmerby Municipality, Tuna, all in the modern Kalmar County for providing five fully armed men for the defense. Tuna is still a family estate for the Hammarskjölds, and the church there houses the family mausoleum for them. The family was introduced to Riddarhuset in 1628. The son of the second marriage, Major Arvid Hammarskjöld, married Anna Dorothea Patkull. The Hammarskjöld dynasty continued with their son, Colonel Carl Gustaf Hammarskjöld, who married Baroness Hedvig Ulfsparre of Broxvik, whose mother belonged to the Stake family (number 47 in Riddarhuset).

A younger branch of the family has been partners and managing directors of Skultuna Messingbruk, a Swedish manufacturer of cuff links in Skultuna near Västerås in Västmanland, by intermarriage with the Adlerwald family. In 2014, there were 61 people who bear the Hammarskjöld or Hammarskiöld surname in Sweden.

== Notable members of the family ==
- Peder Mikaelsson Hammarskjöld (c. 1560–1646), soldier
  - Arvid Hammarsköld (1626–1678), army officer
    - Carl Gustaf Hammarsköld (1662–1729), army officer
      - Carl Hammarsköld (1694–1774), army officer
        - Mikael Hammarskjöld (1732–1802), official (hovjägmästare)
          - Vilhelm Hammarskjöld (1780–1843), factory manager
            - Peder Hjalmar Hammarskjöld (1817–1861), factory manager (husband of Emilie Hammarskjöld (née Holmberg; 1821–1854), Swedish-American musician)
        - Carl Gustaf Hammarsköld (1729–1799), army officer and chamberlain
          - Arvid Hammarskiöld (1787–1866), army officer
            - Per Teodor Hammarskiöld (1819–1908), army officer
              - Ludvig Hammarskiöld (1869–1958), army officier
                - Karin Augusta Sofia Hammarskjöld (1897–1975), businesswoman
                - Per Arvid Magnus Hammarskiöld (1899–1988), engineer
                  - Hans Hammarskiöld (1925–2012), photographer
                - Sven Ludvig Hammarskiöld (1901–1983), judge
                  - Gerd Hammarskiöld (born 1926), librarian
                    - Eva Hamilton (b. 1954), journalist and television executive
                - Göran Hammarskjöld (1906–1969), army officer
                - Lennart Hammarskiöld (1912–1974), banker
          - Lorenzo Hammarsköld (1785–1827), author
          - Carl Åke Hammarskjöld (1768–1848), official (Groom of the Chamber)
            - Carl Leonard Hammarskjöld (1807–1878), army officer
              - Åke Hugo Hammarskjöld (1845–1937), architect and farmer
                - Carl Olof Hammarskjöld (1880–1949), lawyer
                  - Sven Olof Hammarskjöld (1909–1993), physician
                    - Anders Hammarskjöld (born 1942), army officer
              - Carl Hammarskjöld (1838–1898), politician (Minister of Education (1880–1888))
              - Hugo Hammarskjöld (1845–1937), politician (Minister of Education (1906–1909))
            - Knut Vilhelm Hammarskjöld (1818–1891), army officer
              - Carl Gustaf Waldemar Hammarskjöld (1865–1940), army officer
                - Carl Gustaf Fredrik Knut Hammarskjöld (1904–1994), engineer and officer
                  - Carl-Gustaf Hammarskjöld (born 1934)
              - Hjalmar Hammarskjöld (1862–1953), politician (Prime Minister (1914–1917)) (husband of Agnes Hammarskjöld (née Almqvist; 1866–1940))
                - Bo Hammarskjöld (1891–1974), politician (Governor of Södermanland (1935–1958))
                  - Claes Åke Hjalmar Hammarskjöld (born 1924), county director
                - Åke Hammarskjöld (1893–1937), civil servant and diplomat
                  - Knut Hammarskjöld (1922–2012), diplomat
                    - Erik Hammarskjöld (born 1954), diplomat
                  - Peder Hammarskjöld (1923–1994), diplomat
                    - Elinor Hammarskjöld (born 1967), lawyer and diplomat
                  - Michaël Olof Hjalmar Åkesson (1929–2001), official (Secretary of the House of Nobility)
                - Sten Hjalmar Fridolf Knut Hammarskjöld (1900–1972), journalist and author
                - Dag Hammarskjöld (1905–1961), diplomat (Secretary-General of the United Nations)
              - Carl Gustaf Hammarskjöld (1865–1940), politician (Secretary of Defence (1920–1921))
                - Carl Gustaf Fredrik Knut Hammarskjöld (1904–1994), engineer
                - Bengt Gustaf Hjalmar Hammarskjöld (1905–1997)
