= Miguel de Serpa Soares =

Portuguese lawyer

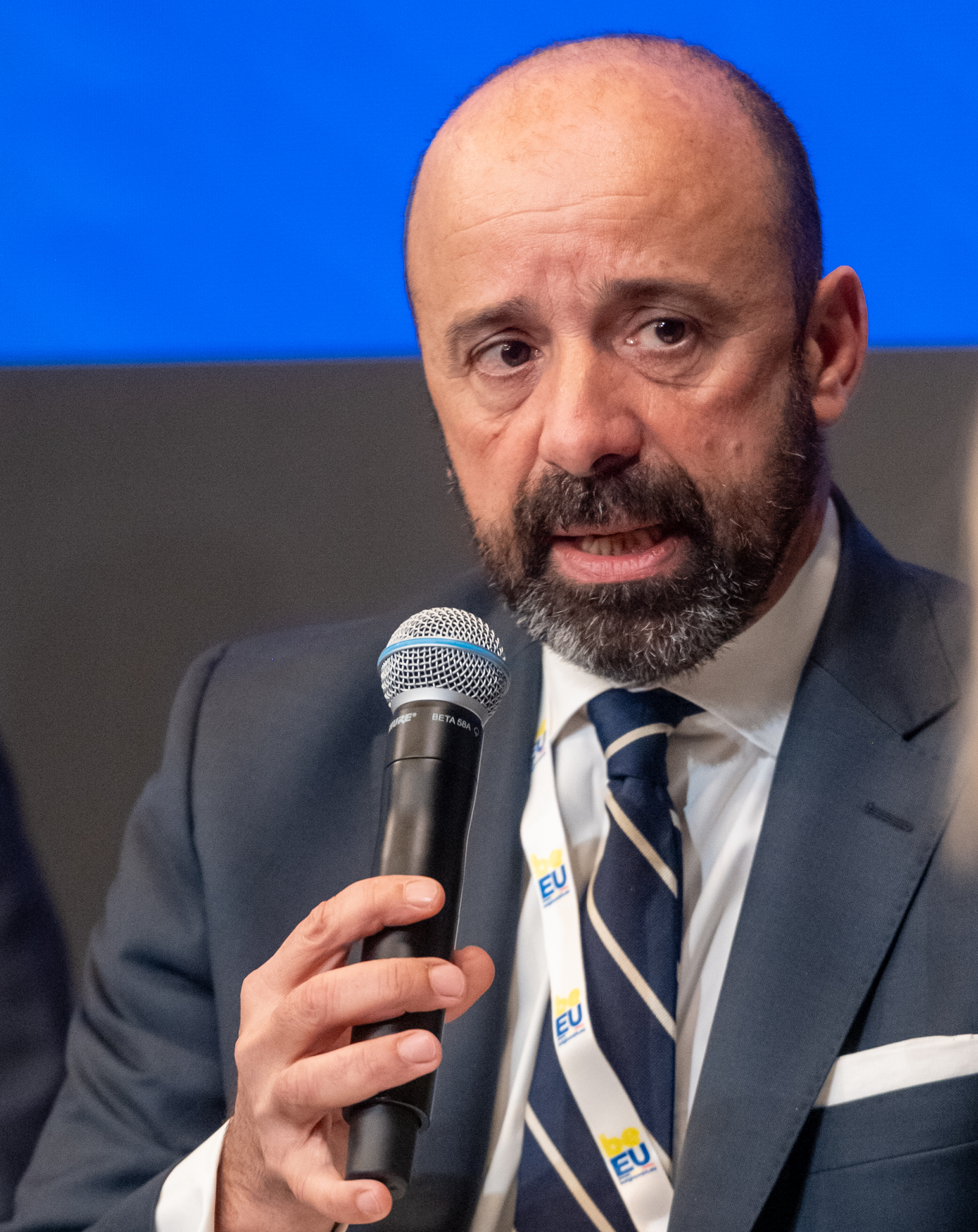
Miguel de Serpa Soares at a Blue Leaders conference in Brussels in 2024.

Miguel de Serpa Soares (born 1967) is a Portuguese lawyer who served as the United Nations Under-Secretary-General for Legal Affairs and United Nations Legal Counsel from 2013 to 2024.

== Early life and education ==
Born in Angola, Serpa Soares graduated from the University of Lisbon with a law degree in 1990 and the College of Europe in 1992 with a Diplôme de Hautes Etudes Juridiques Européennes. He has been a member of the Portuguese Bar since 1993 and is the editor of the Portuguese Yearbook of International Law.

== Career ==
Serpa Soares worked in a number of capacities in the Portuguese legal system, including serving as Legal Adviser to the Permanent Representation of Portugal to the European Union in Brussels from 1999 to 2008, Chief of Staff of the Deputy Minister for Infrastructure, Planning and Territorial Administration in the government of Prime Minister António Guterres from 1996 to 1999, Chair of the Supervisory Board of Lisbon Port Authority between 1997 and 1998 and Associate Lawyer in a Portuguese law firm from 1992 to 1996.

Prior to his appointment with the United Nations, Serpa Soares served as Director General of the Department of Legal Affairs of the Ministry of Foreign Affairs of Portugal from 2008 to 2013. He has been Judge of the Portuguese University Moot Court of International Law since 2011.

=== United Nations Legal Counsel ===
As United Nations Under-Secretary-General for Legal Affairs and United Nations Legal Counsel from 2013 to 2024, Serpa Soares' responsibilities were wide-ranging. In 2014, at the United Nations Open Working Group on Sustainable Development Goals, he gave introductory remarks at a session discussing "The role of the United Nations Convention on the Law of the Sea in sustainable development." He continued to make the law of the sea a priority for the UN Legal Counsel. Serpa Soares often stresses the importance of healthy oceans to the success of the Sustainable Development Goals. He retired in 2024 and was succeeded by Elinor Hammarskjöld.

== Other activities ==
- International Gender Champions (IGC), Member
