= Elinor Hammarskjöld =

Swedish diplomat

Elinor Jane Britt Hammarskjöld (born 4 November 1967) is a Swedish lawyer and diplomat who has served as the United Nations Under-Secretary-General for Legal Affairs and United Nations Legal Counsel since 2025.

== Family and education ==
A member of the Hammarskjöld family, she was born in Rome, Italy, in 1967 to the diplomat Peder Hammarskjöld (1923−1994) and Elizabeth Richardson (born 1928). Her grandfather, the diplomat Åke Hammarskjöld, was an older brother of the United Nations Secretary-General Dag Hammarskjöld, and her great-grandfather Hjalmar Hammarskjöld was Prime Minister of Sweden from 1914 to 1917.

Hammarskjöld studied French and literature at Stockholm University and later obtained Master's degrees in international law from the University of Uppsala and the University of Cambridge.

== Career ==
Hammarskjöld joined the Ministry for Foreign Affairs in 1994, serving in various capacities in Sweden and abroad, including as ambassador to Israel from 2010 to 2013.

In 2025 she was appointed United Nations Under-Secretary-General for Legal Affairs, succeeding Miguel de Serpa Soares of Portugal.

Diplomatic posts
Preceded by Elisabet Borsiin Bonnier	Ambassador of Sweden to Israel; 2010–2013	Succeeded by Carl Magnus Nesser
