= Office of Legal Affairs =

Office of Legal Affairs may refer to:

- United Nations Office of Legal Affairs
- Office of Legal Affairs, Legal Services Corporation
- Office of Legal Affairs, National Mediation Board

== See also ==
- Office of the Legal Adviser, United States Department of State
- Office of Legal Counsel, United States Department of Justice
