= Hammarskjold =

Hammarskjold may refer to:

- Hammarskjöld, Hammarsköld or Hammarskiöld, Swedish surnames
- Hammarskjöld family, Swedish noble family
- Hammarskjöld (film), a 2023 Swedish biographical drama film
- Hammarskjold High School, a school in Thunder Bay, Canada
