= Åke Hammarskjöld =

Swedish lawyer and diplomat (1893–1937)

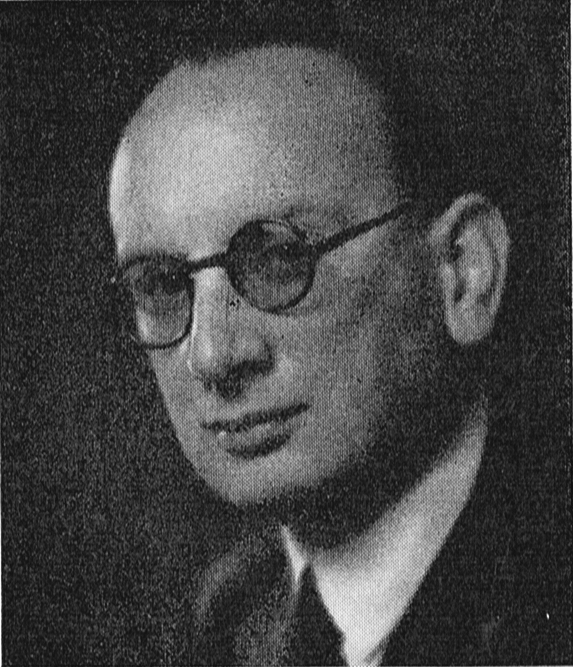
- Born: Åke Wilhelm Hjalmar Hammarskjöld; 10 April 1893; Uppsala, Sweden
- Died: 7 July 1937 (aged 44); The Hague, Netherlands
- Employer: Permanent Court of International Justice
- Title: Registrar (1922–1936); Judge (1936–death)
- Parent(s): Hjalmar Hammarskjöld (father); Agnes Hammarskjöld (mother)
- Relatives: Dag Hammarskjöld (brother); Elinor Hammarskjöld (granddaughter)

Åke Wilhelm Hjalmar Hammarskjöld (10 April 1893 – 7 July 1937) was a Swedish lawyer and diplomat. He was the first Registrar of the Permanent Court of International Justice, serving from 1922 to 1936, when he was elected to the position of judge to the same court. He served in the latter position until his death.

== Life ==
Åke Hammarskjöld was born in 1893 in Uppsala. He studied at the University of Uppsala for a career in the foreign service. During the First World War, he was a member of a committee of the Swedish government which worked out the basis for Sweden's participation in the legal organization of the postwar order. After the war, he served as secretary of the delegation of his country at the Paris Peace Conference. From 1920 he worked in the secretariat of the newly formed League of Nations in drafting the Statute of the Permanent Court of International Justice and organizing the first elections of judges to the court.

In 1922 he was appointed Registrar of the court by the Secretary General of the League of Nations. In 1936 he taught as a lecturer at the Hague Academy of International Law. On October 8 of the same year he was elected as a judge of the Permanent Court of International Justice. He died nine months later in The Hague, at the age of 44.

His father, Hjalmar Hammarskjöld, was Prime Minister of Sweden from 1914 to 1917. His brother Dag was the second Secretary General of the United Nations from 1953 to 1961, and his granddaughter Elinor was appointed United Nations Under-Secretary-General for Legal Affairs in 2025.

== Awards and honors ==
Åke Hammarskjöld became a member of the Institut de Droit International in 1925. The universities of Berne and Stockholm each awarded him an honorary doctorate.

== Works ==
- Some Facts About the World Court. New York 1927
- La Cour permanente de justice internationale á la neuvième session de l'assemblée de la Société des nations. Brüssel 1928
- La Protection des populations civils contre les bombardements. Genf 1930 (als Mitautor)
- Juridiction internationale. Précédé d'une étude sur l'auteur. Leiden 1938
