= Carl Swartz =

Swedish politician (1858–1926)

His Excellency Carl Swartz
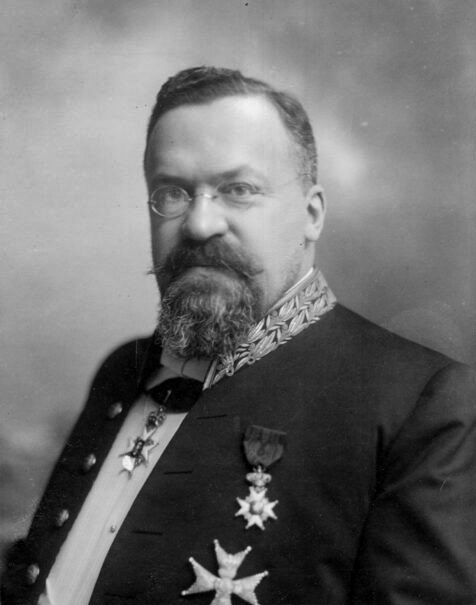

Prime Minister of Sweden
- In office 30 March 1917 – 19 October 1917
- Monarch: Gustaf V
- Preceded by: Hjalmar Hammarskjöld
- Succeeded by: Nils Edén

Minister of Finance
- In office 29 May 1906 – 7 October 1911
- Prime Minister: Arvid Lindman
- Preceded by: Elof Biesèrt
- Succeeded by: Theodor Adelswärd

Personal details
- Born: Carl Johan Gustaf Swartz; 5 June 1858 Norrköping, Sweden
- Died: 6 November 1926 (aged 68) Stockholm, Sweden
- Party: National Party
- Spouse: Dagmar Lundström (m. 1886)
- Relations: Carl Swartz (grandson)
- Children: 3
- Parent(s): Erik Swartz; Elisabeth Forsgren
- Education: Uppsala University; University of Bonn
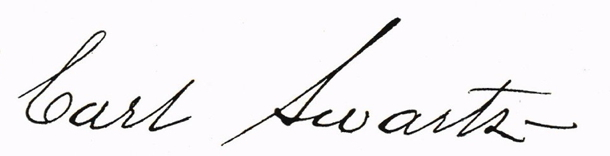
- Signature

Carl Johan Gustaf Swartz (5 June 1858 – 6 November 1926) was a Swedish manufacturer, philanthropist, and politician who briefly served as Prime Minister of Sweden from March to October 1917. He previously served as Minister for Finance from 1906 to 1911.

== Life and career ==
Carl Swartz was born on 5 June 1858 in Norrköping, Östergötland County, the son of factory-owner Erik Swartz and wife Elisabeth Forsgren. After completing studies in Uppsala and Bonn, he returned to Norrköping to run the family business, tobacco producers Petter Swartz. He came to play a large role in his home town, not least culturally. He was chairman of the Board of Directors of, amongst others, Sweden's private Central Bank between 1912 and 1917. In 1917, he became the national university chancellor.

As Minister for Finance between 1906 and 1911, he implemented a number of reforms including integrated income- and property tax, which both became progressive. With the amalgamation of the right-wing groups of the Riksdag's lower chamber, Swartz became a member of the inner council of the newly formed Nationella Partiet (English: The National Party) in 1912.

== World War I ==
During World War I, Swartz was a key figure in the Riksdag in his capacity as Chairman of the Committee of Supply between 1915 and 1917. With the resignation of Hjalmar Hammarskjöld, King Gustav V called on the party-political conservative Swartz to become prime minister. He accepted the appointment more out of a sense of duty rather than personal desire for the office. The new government's foremost task was to exercise a calming influence on the bourgeois which was worried, in anticipation of 1 May 1917, by rumours that the February Revolution in Russia would spread to Sweden.

Swartz was generally considered as a moderate and reasonable conservative, in the style of an old-fashioned and thoughtful mill-owner. He forbade private bourgeois militias in advance of the 1 May 1917 demonstrations, in return for the Social Democratic Party's assurance that they would be responsible for maintaining order. Without this political concession, the confrontations could have escalated during the month of May and resulted in a domestic political crisis.

Discontent stemmed mainly from the fact that the people were living on the brink of starvation. Hunger riots, rather than the political demand for voting rights, lay behind the demonstrations. The situation calmed with the beginning of the potato harvest in early summer. Swartz also quickly concluded trade negotiations with Great Britain in an attempt to address the hunger crisis.

The Social Democrats used the hunger riots to put pressure on the right-wing government, with demands such as universal suffrage, women's suffrage and removal of the 40-degree voting scale in municipal elections. The government was divided on these issues. Leader of the left-wing faction, Minister for Civil Affairs, Oscar von Sydow and Minister for Finance, Conrad Carleson (1868–1954) agreed with the Social Democrats' and Liberals' proposals. They threatened to resign if Swartz agreed with Minister for Foreign Affairs, Arvid Lindman’s demand to maintain the status quo. The Minister for Finance was backed by the industry, which wanted an end to the debacle. Swartz was irresolute and felt under pressure from his opponents and his solution was to wait for the spring election. This action was historic: he became the first leading conservative to follow the parliamentary principle that the people - not the king - should choose the government.

Gustav V attempted for a long time to avoid a breakthrough for parliamentarianism, but his wish to allow Swartz to continue, despite the left-wing parties' success in the 1917 election was undermined by the involvement of Swartz's son in a black marketeering scandal, a violation of existing rationing.

== Reputation, legacy and death ==
Carl Swartz was also an eminent municipal figure and a generous philanthropist. In 1912, he donated Villa Swartz to the town of Norrköping, as accommodation for a library and museum. He died in Stockholm on 6 November 1926.

Government offices
Preceded by Elof Biesèrt	Swedish Minister for Finance; 1906 – 1911	Succeeded by Theodor Adelswärd
Preceded by Hjalmar Hammarskjöld	Prime Minister of Sweden; March – October 1917	Succeeded by Nils Edén
