= Vägmärken =

1963 book by former UN secretary general Dag Hammarskjöld

Vägmärken (Markings, or more literally Waymarks), published in 1963, is the only book by former UN secretary general, Dag Hammarskjöld. The journal was discovered after his death, with a covering letter to his literary executor, "a sort of White Book concerning my negotiations with myself – and with God." After the original Swedish version was published in 1963, the English translation came out in 1964. The translation was done by noted Swedish scholar Leif Sjöberg, and was refined by the poet W. H. Auden, who also wrote a foreword. This brought the book immediate literary notice, and even a front-page rave in The New York Times Book Review. It is highly regarded as a classic of contemporary spiritual literature.

== Personal significance ==
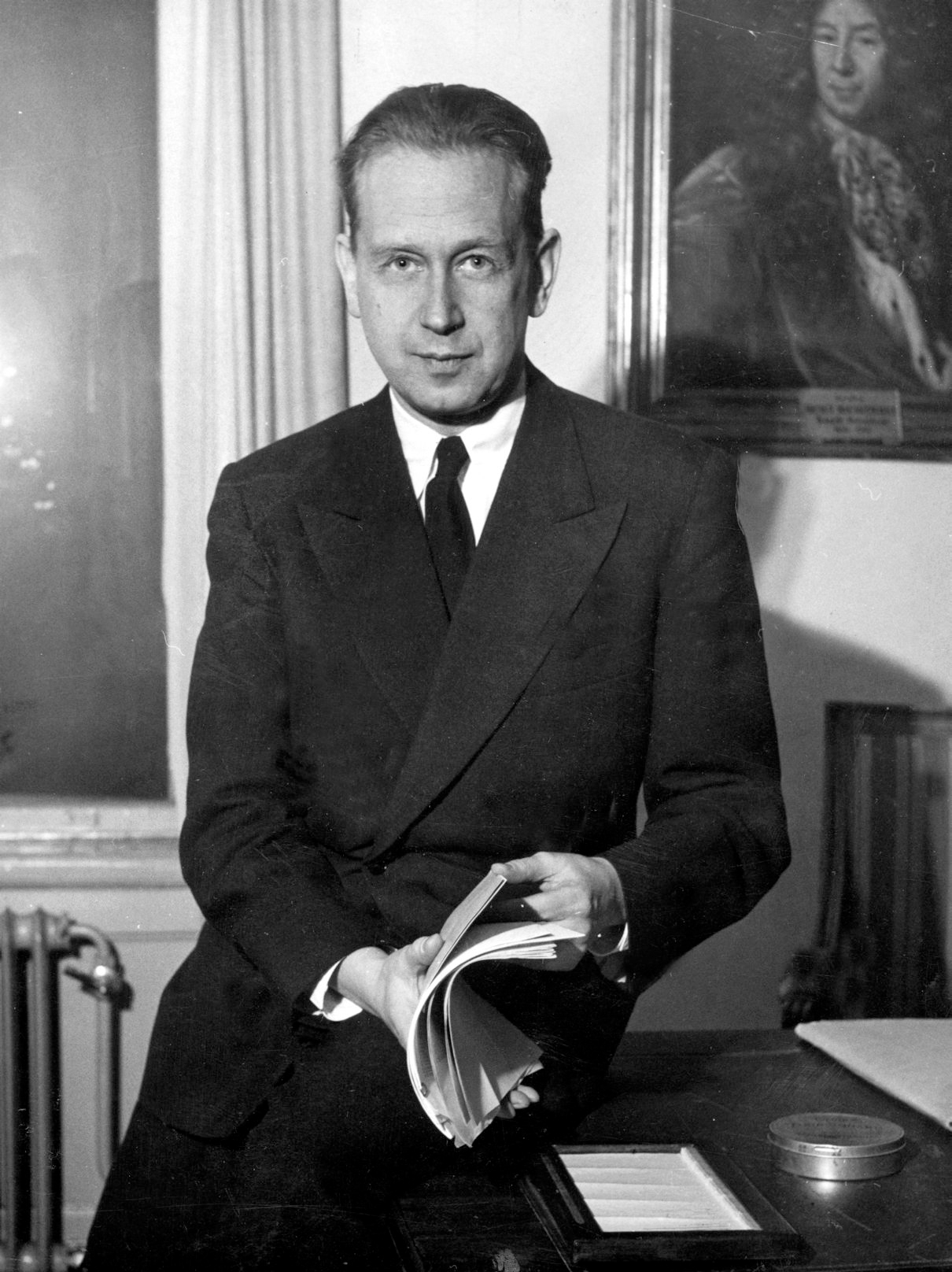
Dag Hammarskjöld, author of Markings

A collection of his diary reflections, the book starts in 1925, when he was 20 years old, and ends at his death in 1961. The typewritten manuscript was found in the bedside table of his New York apartment after Hammarskjöld's death in the Congo. As van Dusen writes: "His last night had been spent in the residency of Sture Linner, head of the United Nations mission to the Congo. He left there the copy of the German original of Ich und Du (I and Thou) presented to him by Martin Buber and the first dozen pages of his translation into Swedish...Beside the bed was the cherished copy of Thomas à Kempis' The Imitation of Christ which was always on the table of his New York City apartment next to his bed where the manuscript of Markings was found."

Many of the entries in Markings describe Hammarskjöld's struggles to view his professional duty as a spiritual responsibility. The entry on June 11, 1961, for example, reads: "Summoned/To carry it,/Aloned/To assay it,/Chosen/To suffer it,/And free/To deny it,/I saw/For one moment/The sail/In the sun-storm,/Far off/On a wave-crest,/Alone,/Bearing from land./For one moment/I saw."

Hammarskjöld died in a plane crash in Zambia, near midnight, on September 17–18, 1961. The last entry of Markings is dated 24 August 1961: "Is it a new country/In another world of reality/Than Day's?/Or did I live there/Before Day was?/ I awoke/To an ordinary morning with grey light/Reflected from the street,/But still remembered/The dark-blue night/Above the tree line,/The open moor in moonlight,/The crest in shadow,/Remembered other dreams/Of the same mountain country:/Twice I stood on its summits,/I stayed by its remotest lake,/And followed the river/Towards its source./The seasons have changed/And the light/And the weather/And the hour./But it is the same land./And I begin to know the map/And to get my bearings."

== Spiritual significance ==
Markings was described by the late theologian Henry P. Van Dusen as "the noblest self-disclosure of spiritual struggle and triumph, perhaps the greatest testament of personal faith written ... in the heat of professional life and amidst the most exacting responsibilities for world peace and order." He notes that "among the approximately six hundred 'Road Marks' staked down along the "Way' of Dag Hammarskjöld's pilgrimage, almost exactly a hundred are concerned in greater or lesser measure with God."

Hammarskjöld writes, for example, "We are not permitted to choose the frame of our destiny. But what we put into it is ours. He who wills adventure will experience it—according to the measure of his courage. He who wills sacrifice will be sacrificed—according to the measure of his purity of heart."

The entry of 4 August 1959 reads: "To have humility is to experience reality, not in relation to ourselves, but in its sacred independence. It is to see, judge, and act from the point of rest in ourselves. Then, how much disappears, and all that remains falls into place. In the point of rest at the centre of our being, we encounter a world where all things are at rest in the same way. Then a tree becomes a mystery, a cloud, a revelation, each man a cosmos of whose riches we can only catch glimpses. The life of simplicity is simple, but it opens to us a book in which we never get beyond the first syllable."

== Literary significance ==
Markings is characterised by Hammarskjöld's intermingling of prose and haiku poetry in a manner exemplified by the 17th-century Japanese poet Basho in his Narrow Roads to the Deep North. Representative examples include:

The Easter-lily's dew-wet calyx.
Drops pausing
Between earth and sky.

They laid the blame on him.
He didn't know what it was,
But he confessed it.

Trees quiver in the wind,
Sailing on a sea of mist
Out of earshot.

In his foreword to Markings, the English poet W. H. Auden states: "Markings, however, was not intended to be read simply as a work of literature. It is also an historical document of the first importance as an account—and I cannot myself recall another—of the attempt by a professional man of action to unite in one life the Via Activa and the Via Contemplativa." Auden quotes Hammarskjöld as stating "In our age, the road to holiness necessarily passes through the world of action."

== First translations ==
- Markings, English translation, Faber & Faber, 1964 (Translators: Leif Sjöberg and W. H. Auden)
- Vejmærker, Danish translation, Gyldendal, 1964 (Translator: Asta Hoff-Jørgensen)
- Veimerker, Norwegian translation, Cappelen, 1964 (Translators: Karin Bang and Aasmund Brynildsen)
- Kiinnekohtia, Finnish translation, Otava, 1964 (Translator: Sinikka Kallio)
- Zeichen am Weg, German translation, Droemer Knaur, 1965 (Translator: Anton Graf Knyphausen)
- Marcas en el camino, Spanish translation, Seix Barral, 1965 (Translator: Miguel Hernández Cuspinera)
- Merkstenen, Dutch translation, Brouwer, 1965 (Translator: Richard Boshouwers)
- Jalons, French translation, Plon, 1966 (Translators: Carl Gustaf Bjurström and Philippe Dumaine)
- Linea della vita, Italian translation, Rizzoli, 1966 (Translators: Louise Åkerstein and Gian Antonio De Toni)
- Pensamentos, Portuguese translation, Vecchi, 1967 (Translator: Paulo Nasser)
- Michishirube [道しるべ], Japanese translation, Misuzushobō [みすず書房], 1967 (Translator: Nobushige Ukai [鵜飼信成])
- Drogowskazy, Polish translation, Znak, 1967 (Translator: Jan Zieja)
- Deichtes poreias [Δείχτες πορείας], Greek translation, Tōn philōn [των Φίλων], 1969 (Translator: Eysevios N. Vittēs [Ευσέβιος Ν. Βίττης])
- Smerovníky životom, Slovak translation, Tranoscius, 1998 (Translator: Milan Richter)
- Hén jì [痕迹], Chinese translation, Logos [基道], 2000 (Translator: Yau-Yuk Chong [莊柔玉])
