= Ravi Somaiya =

- Occupation: Journalist
- Genre: non-fiction
- Subjects: Crime, terrorism; Cold War history; espionage
- Years active: 2000s–present
- Notable works: The Golden Thread: The Cold War and the Mysterious Death of Dag Hammarskjöld

Ravi Somaiya is a British author and journalist, most known for his investigative work and his 2020 book on the murder of UN Secretary General Dag Hammarskjöld.

== Background ==
Somaiya was born in England. His grandparents were Indians who migrated to Uganda.

== Career ==
He has been a correspondent for the New York Times, and also written for the Guardian, Rolling Stone and New York Magazine. His topics range from crime, terrorism, Wikileaks to table tennis.

In 2020, he published the book The Golden Thread: The Cold War and the Mysterious Death of Dag Hammarskjöld where he presents proof that Hammarskjöld was murdered and that the plane crash was not an accident.

His 2022 Air Mail story “The Root of All Evil” on an exorcism in Mexico City is in development with Prologue Entertainment, Atomic Monster and Blumhouse as a psychological thriller.

In late 2025 he founded Bungalow, a magazine devoted to exploring one overlooked or under-reported story in depth. The magazine has co-published reporting projects with publications including the Financial Times.
