= Tuna, Vimmerby =

Tuna
- Location within Kalmar Location within Sweden
- Coordinates: 57°35′N 16°06′E
- Country: Sweden
- Province: Småland
- County: Kalmar County
- Municipality: Vimmerby Municipality

Area
  - Total: 0.29 km^{2} (0.11 sq mi)

Population (31 December 2010)
  - Total: 227
  - Density: 793/km^{2} (2,050/sq mi)
- Time zone: UTC+1 (CET)
  - Summer (DST): UTC+2 (CEST)
- Climate: Cfb

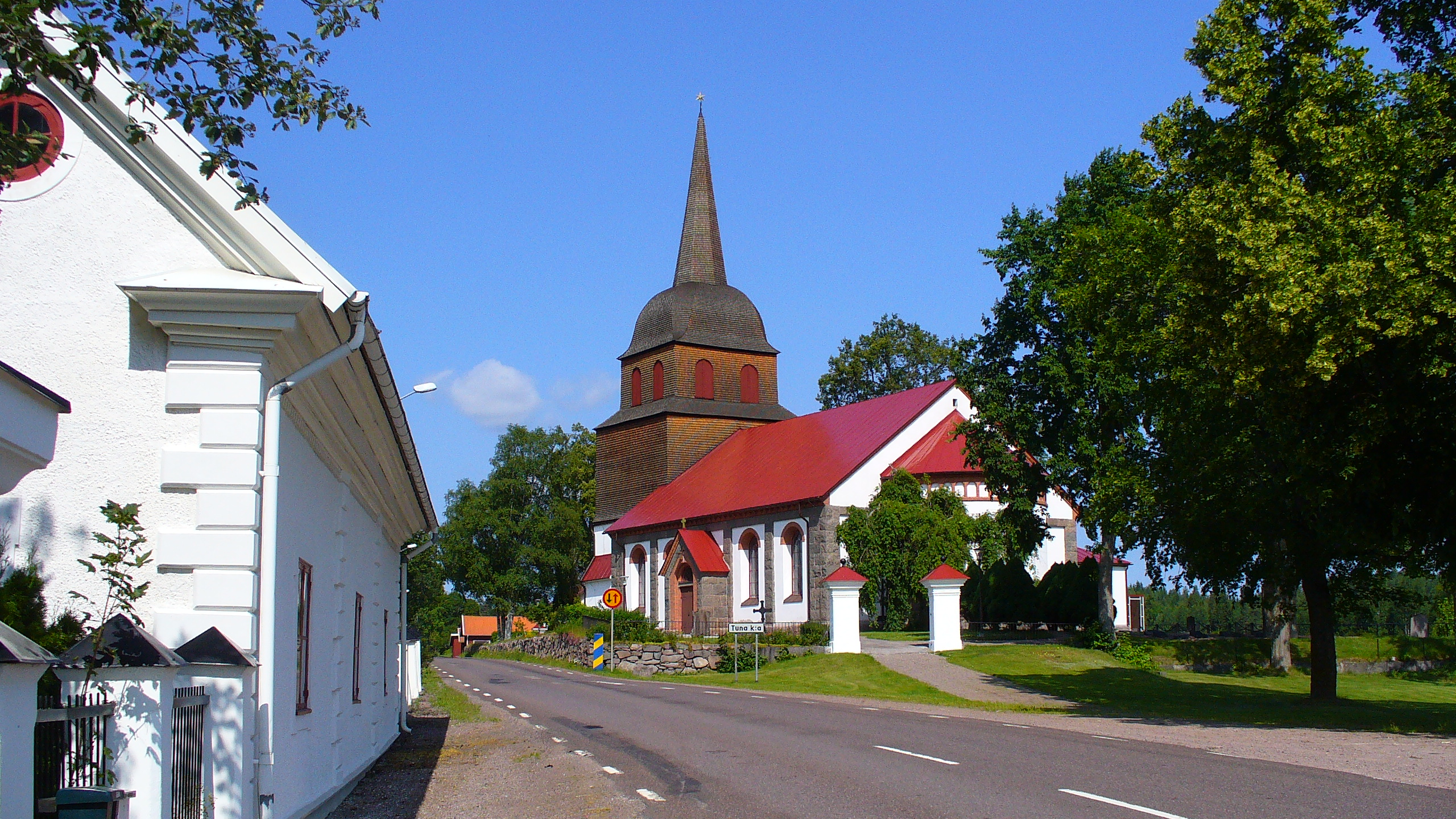
Tuna Church, Vimmerby Municipality

Tuna is a locality situated in Vimmerby Municipality, Kalmar County, Sweden with 227 inhabitants in 2010.

Tuna was the birthplace of Lorenzo Hammarsköld (1785–1827), a Swedish critic and literary historian. He also published poetry.
