= Hjalmar Hammarskjöld =

Prime Minister of Sweden from 1914 to 1917

His Excellency Hjalmar Hammarskjöld
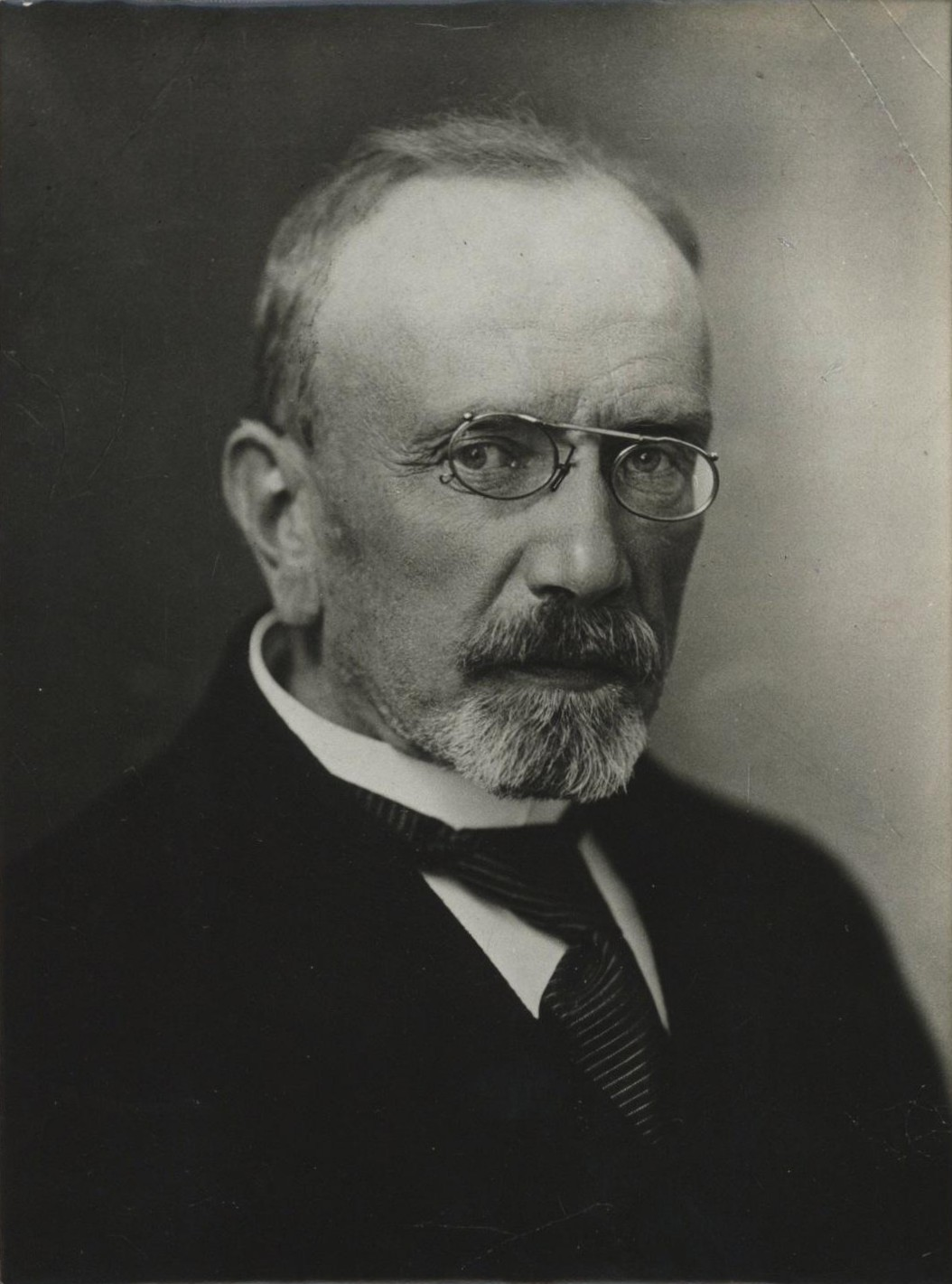
- Hammarskjöld c. 1915–1925

Prime Minister of Sweden
- In office 17 February 1914 – 30 March 1917
- Monarch: Gustaf V
- Preceded by: Karl Staaff
- Succeeded by: Carl Swartz

Minister of Education and Ecclesiastical Affairs
- In office 2 August 1905 – 7 November 1905
- Prime Minister: Christian Lundeberg
- Preceded by: Karl Husberg
- Succeeded by: Fridtjuv Berg

Minister of Justice
- In office 5 December 1901 – 2 August 1902
- Prime Minister: Fredrik von Otter
- Preceded by: Ludvig Annerstedt
- Succeeded by: Ossian Berger

Personal details
- Born: Knut Hjalmar Leonard Hammarskjöld; 4 February 1862 Vimmerby, Sweden
- Died: 12 October 1953 (aged 91) Stockholm, Sweden
- Party: Independent
- Spouse: Agnes Almquist (m. 1890; died 1940)
- Children: Bo; Åke; Sten; Dag
- Education: Uppsala University
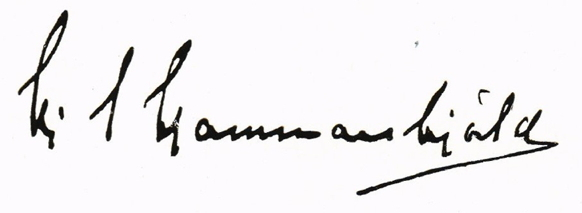
- Signature

Member of the Swedish Academy (Seat No. 17)
- In office 20 December 1918 – 12 October 1953
- Preceded by: Per Jacob von Ehrenheim
- Succeeded by: Dag Hammarskjöld

Knut Hjalmar Leonard Hammarskjöld (Swedish: [ˈjǎlmar ˈhâmːarˌɧœld]; 4 February 1862 – 12 October 1953) was a Swedish statesman, diplomat, and academic who served as Prime Minister of Sweden from 1914 to 1917. An independent conservative, he represented Uppsala County in the Riksdag from 1923 to 1938. His premiership was marked by economic hardship, domestic unrest, and growing tensions over suffrage and food shortages during World War I, all while maintaining neutrality throughout the conflict.

A member of the prominent Hammarskjöld family, he studied law at Uppsala University. He later served as Minister for Justice and Minister of Education and Ecclesiastical Affairs. He was appointed as prime minister following the resignation of Karl Staaff.

During World War I, although he was perceived as pro-German, he pursued a policy of neutrality. He rejected a trade agreement with Britain, and food shortages led to protests against his government. Hammarskjöld resigned in 1917. He continued to hold political offices and continued his scholarly work. He died in October 1953, six months after his son, Dag, became the second Secretary-General of the United Nations.

== Life and work ==
=== Early life ===
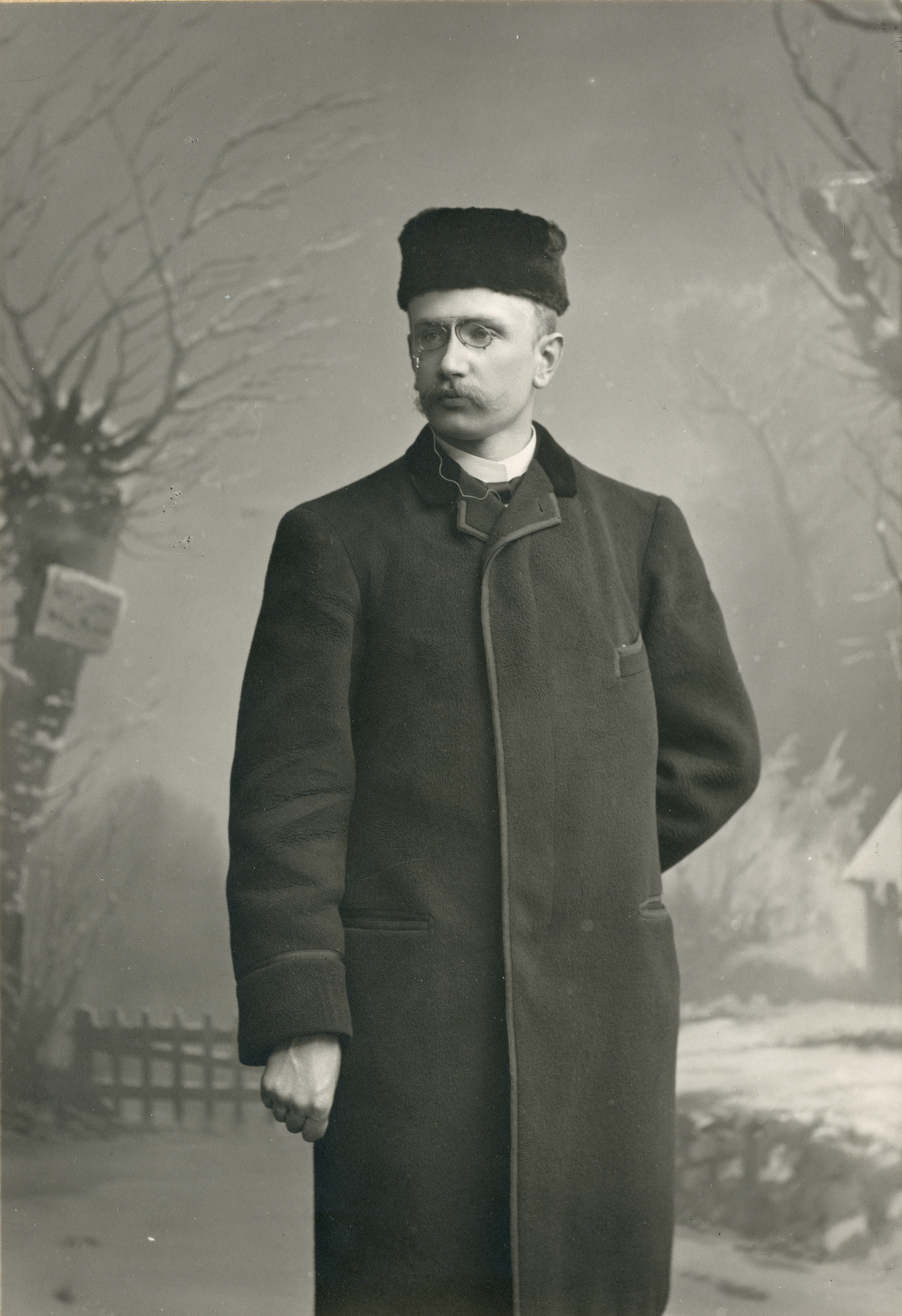
Hammarskjöld in Uppsala, c. 1890

The son of lieutenant Knut Vilhelm Hammarskjöld and Maria Lovisa Cecilia Vilhelmina Cöster, Knut Hjalmar Leonard Hammarskjöld was born into the Hammarskjöld family on 4 February 1862, at Väderum's farm in Tjust in Tuna, Vimmerby, Kalmar County. Knut Hammarskjöld was a noble, landowner, and female line descendant of an illegitimate daughter of Eric XIV of Sweden. Hjalmar's younger brother Carl Gustaf Hammarskjöld later became Sweden's minister of defence.

At age 16, he became a student at Uppsala University. After six years of studying, he graduated with a bachelor's degree in philosophy and law.

Hammarskjöld was a versatile legal expert and prominent as both a scholar and as a legislator. In 1891, he became a professor in Uppsala University and had a great influence on Swedish and Nordic civil law. He laid the foundation for his reputation as an expert in international law at the same time through diligent work in international meetings, and became a member of the Permanent Court of Arbitration in 1904 at The Hague. He was a participant at the Second Hague Peace Conference in 1907.

On 3 September 1890, he married Agnes Maria Carolina Almquist (15 January 1866 – 21 January 1940). The couple had four sons: Bo, Åke, Sten, and Dag. Agnes was the daughter of director general Gustaf Fridolf Almquist and his wife Maria Vilhelmina Gradin.

=== Early political career ===
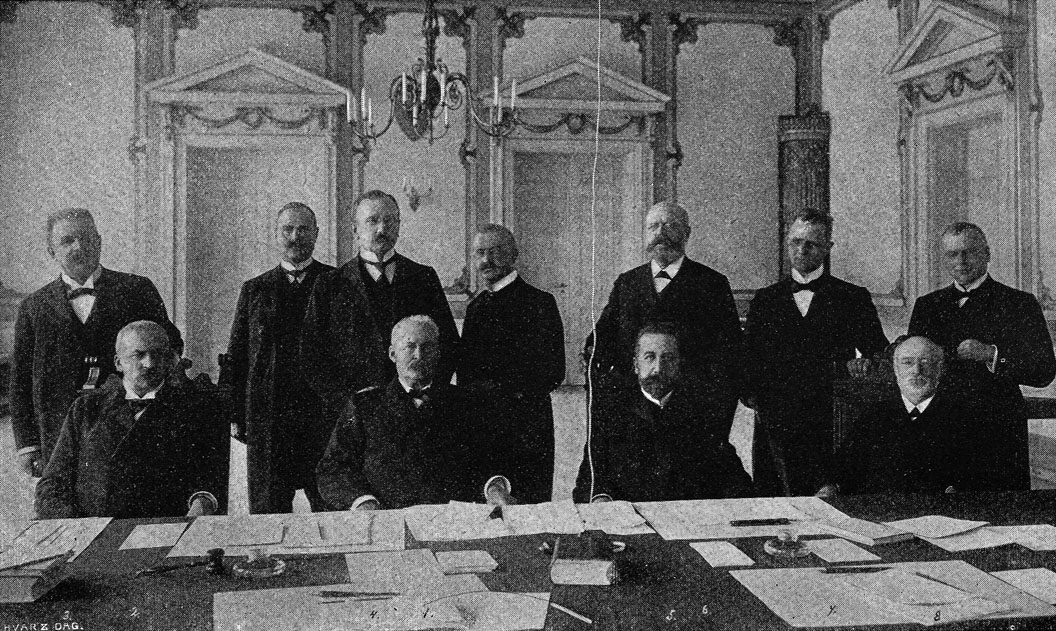
Delegates, including Hammarskjöld (fourth from left), in Karlstad to negotiate the dissolution of the Swedish-Norwegian union, 1905. Karl Staaff (left), is also pictured.

From 5 December 1901 to 2 August 1902, Hammarskjöld served as Minister of Justice in Fredrik von Otter's government. In this position, he made an ambitious but unsuccessful attempt to resolve the problems concerning the right to vote, and was, on his resignation, appointed president of the Göta Court of Appeal.

In 1905, he returned to politics as part of as a member of Christian Lundeberg's coalition government, being the only member of the cabinet who had previously served in another cabinet. In this cabinet he became Minister of Education and Ecclesiastical Affairs. In this position, he was one of the negotiators of the dissolution of the union between Sweden and Norway in Karlstad. His term began on 2 August of that year. Lundberg, who lead conservatives in the Riksdag, chose Hammarskjöld to discuss the legal aspects of the agreement with the Norwegians. Hammarskjöld resisted making concessions to the Norwegians, and they regarded him as the person most responsible for their failure to attain more favorable conditions for the dissolution. The working relationship between the Swedish delegates was good, and Hammarskjöld was specifically pleased with his cooperation with the Liberal politician Karl Staaff. His term ended on 7 November of that year.

In 1905, after Lundeberg's government ended, Staaff became prime minister, and he appointed Hammarskjöld to be the Swedish ambassador to Copenhagen in December of that year. This was considered to be an important position at the time, as following the dissolution of the Swedish-Norwegian union, Scandinavian tensions were increasing. After two years, relations had eased again. However, Hammarskjöld found the independence of the role unappealing. He returned in October 1907 to Uppsala to serve as its county governor, but often took leave of absence for various other assignments. While he was governor, Hammarskjöld and his family lived in Uppsala Castle.

After the Second Moroccan Crisis, tensions reignited between Sweden and Denmark. Hammarskjöld was sent back to Copenhagen to negotiate in 1912, specifically disagreements over territorial waters, pilot and navigational rules, and the expectations of neutral countries during wartime. The negotiations quickly ended the disputes.

=== Prime minister ===
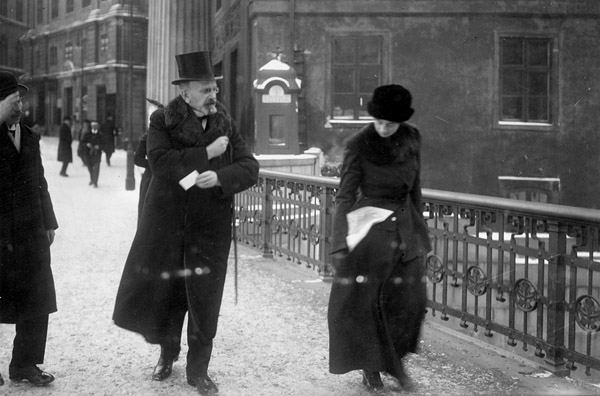
Prime Minister Hammarskjöld on his way from the government building to the parliament in Stockholm in 1917.

After the peasant armament support march (Swedish: bondetåget) and the resignation of the liberal government, he became head of a non-parliamentarian government in 1914, tasked with solving defense issues. King Gustaf V had first approached Gerhard Louis De Geer to form a government, but when he failed, the task went to Hammarskjöld. His "courtyard government" (Swedish: borggårdsregering) was politically independent, but loyal to the king and rather conservative. Four members of the cabinet were from the Conservatives, with the majority being unaffiliated with any party. It was created on an initiative from Arvid Lindman, the leader of the right-wing party in the second chamber, who did not want the king to appoint a cabinet under the leader of the right-wing party in the first chamber, Ernst Trygger.

After the outbreak of the First World War that same year, most of Sweden's conservatives supported Germany in the conflict, while the liberals and the Social Democratic Party supported neutrality. Hammarskjöld and his foreign minister, Knut Agathon Wallenberg, firmly agreed that Sweden should pursue armed neutrality and avoid alliances. A truce was established between the parties and the defense problem was solved to the satisfaction of the military. Hammarskjöld was principled and inflexible in his interpretations of civil law during the height of the war.

By the third year of the war, Sweden faced an economic crisis, with grain consumption per capita down by 50%, shortages of fodder and fertilizer, and luxury goods such as coffee and sweets being nearly unattainable even for the wealthiest. A drop in raw material imports also contributed to factories shutting down, causing an increase in unemployment. The desire for an increase in trade to combat the crisis became the most important matter in foreign policy by January 1917, and the parties became deeply divided over how to resolve the crisis. It was during this time that the term 'Hunger shield' (Swedish: Hungerskjöld) was coined, because his intractability impeded efforts to get necessary food exports into Sweden. He was seen as too friendly towards Germany when he rejected the proposal for a common trade agreement with Great Britain that Marcus Wallenberg, brother of the foreign minister Knut Wallenberg, had brought home from London in 1917. The split between the PM and the Foreign Minister became apparent.

In March 1917, the second chamber voted to cut by two-thirds the government's request for funding for the "neutrality watch". Hammarskjöld took this as a vote of no confidence and attempted to resign. After nearly a month of negotiations, it was decided that he would be succeeded as prime minister by the conservative Carl Swartz. Hammarskjöld successfully resigned on 30 March 1917.

Hammarskjöld had a dominant nature and was perceived by his opponents as authoritarian and strong-willed, but claims that he favoured Germany lack documented support.

=== Later life ===
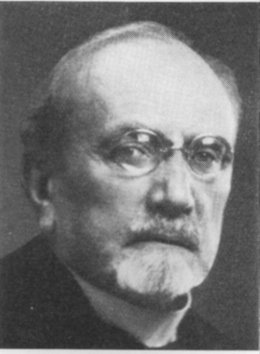
Hammarskjöld, c. 1930s

He served in the first chamber of the Riksdag from 1923 through 1938. He was supported by the conservative National Election League, but never joined it or any other party. He often commented on political disputes in sharp and sarcastic ways, but gained the general respect of his peers. Hammarskjöld retired as governor of Uppsala in 1930, ages 68. In 1940, during the Winter War, Hammarskjöld was one of many Swedish intellectuals who signed a petition calling on the United States to support Finland.

Hammarskjöld served as chairman of the Nobel Foundation from 1929 to 1947. In 1929, a rare instance occurred when the majority of Nobel Prize recipients were present in-person to receive them from Hammarskjöld.

He was voted into the Swedish Academy in 1918 to the same chair as Prime Minister Louis De Geer had occupied, number 17. Hammarskjöld's son, Dag, inherited the chair, as well as the position, after his death. Hammarskjöld's investigations were a major contributing factor to the decision to establish the Supreme Administrative Court of Sweden.

Hjalmar Hammarskjöld died on 12 October 1953 in Stockholm, just over six months after his youngest son became the second Secretary General of the United Nations. His funeral, which Dag returned to Sweden for, was held in Stockholm.

== Literature ==
- T. Gihl, The history of Swedish foreign policy 4 (1951)
- D. Hammarskjöld, Hjalmar Hammarskjöld: entry speech in the Swedish Academy (1954)
- W. Carlgren, The minister Hammarskjöld (1967)
- S.A. Söderpalm, The big company owners and the democratic breakthrough (1969)

Political offices
Preceded by Karl Staaff	Prime Minister of Sweden; 1914-1917	Succeeded by Carl Swartz
Non-profit organization positions
Preceded by Henrik Schück	Chairman of the Nobel Foundation; 1929–1947	Succeeded by Birger Ekeberg
Cultural offices
Preceded by Pehr Jacob von Ehrenheim	Swedish Academy, Seat No.17; 1918-1953	Succeeded by Dag Hammarskjöld
