= Agnes Hammarskjöld =

Swedish woman (1866–1940)

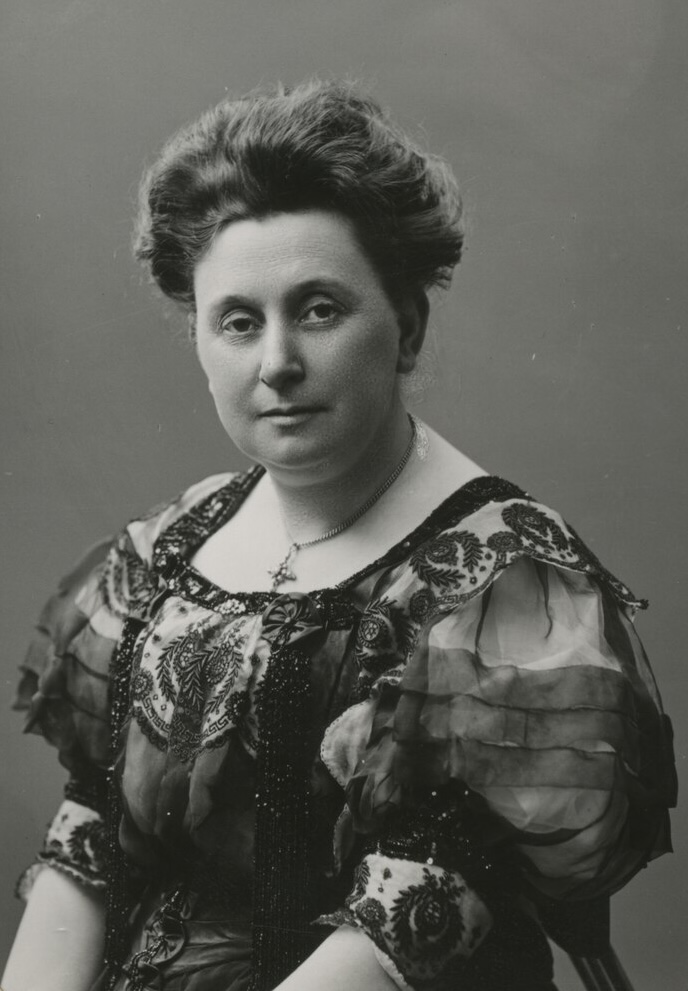
- Hammarskjöld c. 1907-1908

Spouse of the Prime Minister of Sweden
- Assumed role 1914–1917
- Prime Minister: Hjalmar Hammarskjöld

Personal details
- Born: Agnes Maria Carolina Almquist; 15 January 1866 Stockholm, Sweden
- Died: 21 January 1940 (aged 74) Stockholm, Sweden
- Spouse: Hjalmar Hammarskjöld
- Children: 4

Agnes Hammarskjöld (née Almqvist; 15 January 1866 – 21 January 1940) was a Swedish woman who was the wife of Hjalmar Hammarskjöld, a Swedish nobleman and prime minister from 1914 to 1917.

== Biography ==
Agnes Almqvist was born in 1866. She hailed from an established family, and her father was Fridolf Almqvist who served as the director general of the National Prisons Board. Carl Jonas Love Almqvist, an author, was her father's half-brother. Agnes had four brothers.

She married Hjalmar Hammarskjöld, and they lived in Vasa Castle. They had four sons: Bo, Åke, Sten and Dag.

She was warm and generous, combining intellectualism with a strong emotional side. The day she died, Dag Hammarskjöld wrote to a friend, "She had the qualities I admire the most: she was courageous and good."

She was a religious person and intensively dealt with theology. She was one of the confidants of Lars Olof Jonathan Soderblom, the Lutheran bishop of Uppsala. She died in 1940 and was buried in the family grave in Uppsala.

In October 2011 a book about her entitled Agnes dag: en bild av Agnes Maria Carolina Almquist, gift Hammarskjöld was published by Lisa Segerhed.
