= Lorenzo Hammarsköld =

Swedish critic and literary historian

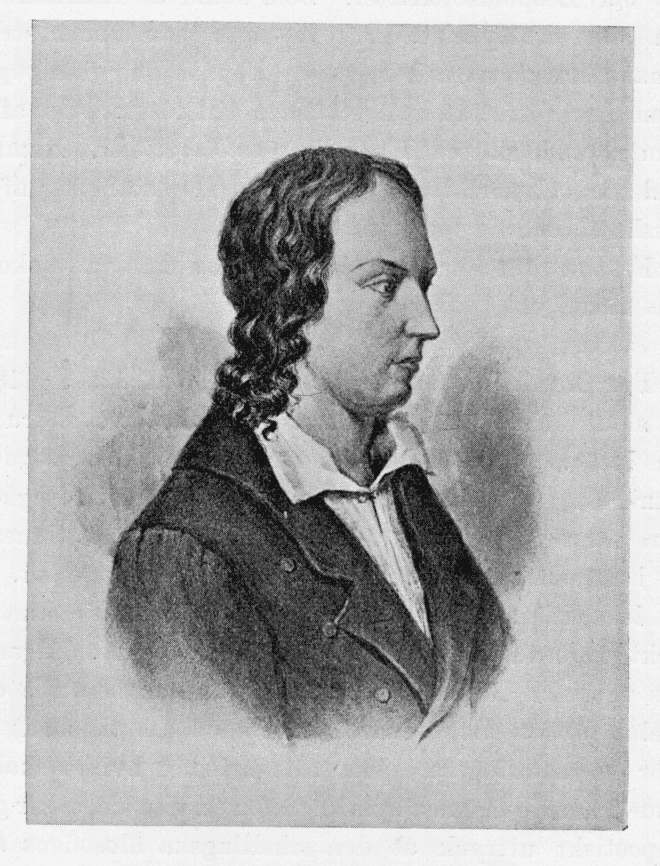
Lorenzo Hammarsköld.

Lorenzo Hammarsköld (b. Lars Hammarskjöld, 7 April 1785 – 15 October 1827) was a Swedish critic and literary historian. He also published poetry.

== Biography ==
He was born at Tuna, Vimmerby. He became a student at Uppsala in 1801, but failed to take his degree in 1806. He therefore accepted a humble post at the royal library at Stockholm, with which institution he remained connected for many years.

In 1804 he published an article on Ludwig Tieck and Novalis, which attracted much attention, and was the means of founding the “Phosphoric School,” as it was called, of poetry in Sweden. Hammarsköld became the friend of Atterbom and antagonist of Wallmark, and in due time, by the bitterness of his tone, brought down on himself the scathing anger of Esaias Tegnér. In 1806 he published Translations and Imitations of Poets, Old and New, in the preface of which he denounced the classic Swedish writers with much force and wit, commending Goethe and Tieck to the young poets of the day.

In 1803 appeared his Critique of Schiller, and in 1810 a volume of essays of a polemical kind. In 1813 Hammarsköld published a collection of his poems, and in 1815 had to endure the ridicule of Tegnér's satire Hammarspik. In 1818 appeared the first part of Hammarsköld's chief contribution to literature, his famous Svenska Vitterheten, a history of polite letters in Sweden, a book that was revised and republished after his death by Sondén, in 1833.

Hammarsköld was among the first to recognise the talent of the poet Erik Johan Stagnelius. He collected the works of the deceased poet and published his poems in 1824–26.
