= United Nations Office of Legal Affairs =

United Nations office

- Abbreviation: OLA
- Formation: 13 February 1946; 79 years ago
- Type: Secretariat office
- Legal status: Active
- Headquarters: New York, United States
- Head: Under-Secretary-General; Elinor Hammarskjöld
- Parent organization: United Nations Secretariat
- Website: legal.un.org

The United Nations Office of Legal Affairs (OLA) is a United Nations office currently administered by Under-Secretary-General for Legal Affairs and Legal Counsel of the United Nations Elinor Hammarskjöld.

== History ==
Established in 1946, the United Nations Office of Legal Affairs provides a unified central legal service for the Secretariat and the principal and other organs of the United Nations and contributes to the progressive development and codification of international public and trade law. Pursuant to Article 102 of the UN Charter, OLA registers, publishes, and serves as a depository of international treaties. The office also functions to promote the strengthening and development as well as the effective implementation of the international legal order for the seas and oceans.

== Units ==
The Office consists of six divisions:

- Office of the Legal Counsel (OLC)
- General Legal Division (GLD)
- Codification Division (COD)
- Division for Ocean Affairs and the Law of the Sea (DOALOS)
- International Trade Law Division (ITLD)
- Treaty Section (TREATY).

== Treaties ==
The Office of Legal Affairs, through its Treaty Section, discharges the depositary functions of the Secretary-General under more than 560 multilateral treaties, including the custody of originals and the receipt of signatures and instruments of ratification, accession, etc. The Office is also responsible for the registration and publication of treaties and international agreements under Article 102 of the Charter of the United Nations.

After their adoption, Treaties as well as their amendments have to follow the official legal procedures of the United Nations, as applied by the Office of Legal Affairs, including signature, ratification and entry into force.

== See also ==
- United Nations General Assembly Sixth Committee (Legal)
- International conventions on terrorism and counter-terrorism (Anti-terrorism legislation)
- International Law Commission (ILC)
- United Nations Commission on International Trade Law (UNCITRAL)
