= Dag Hammarskjöld =

UN Secretary-General from 1953 to 1961

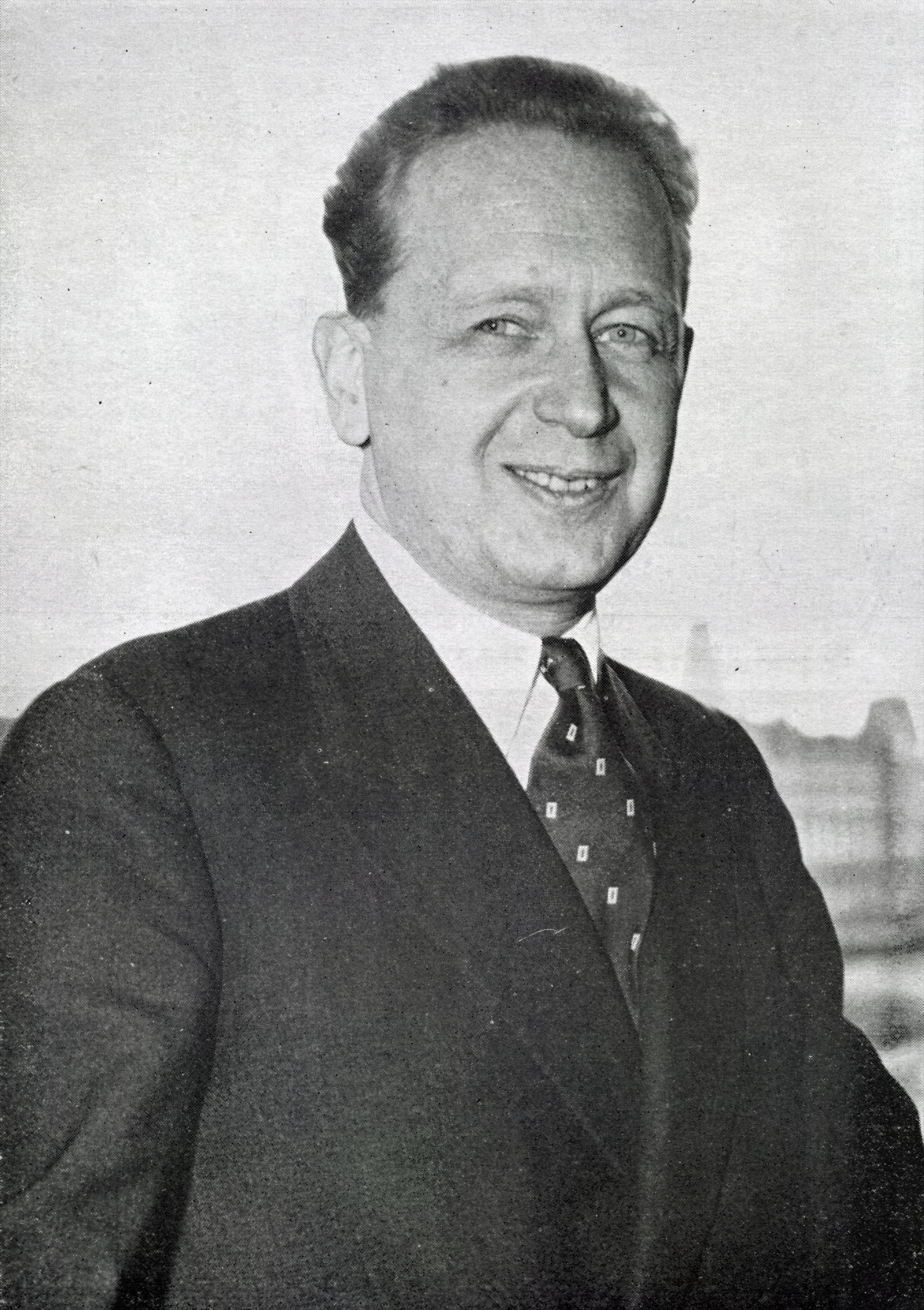
- Hammarskjöld in the 1950s

2nd Secretary-General of the United Nations
- In office 10 April 1953 – 18 September 1961
- Preceded by: Trygve Lie
- Succeeded by: U Thant

Personal details
- Born: Dag Hjalmar Agne Carl Hammarskjöld; 29 July 1905 Jönköping, Sweden
- Died: 18 September 1961 (aged 56) Ndola, Northern Rhodesia
- Cause of death: Aeroplane crash
- Party: Independent
- Parents: Hjalmar Hammarskjöld (father); Agnes Hammarskjöld (mother)
- Education: Uppsala University; Stockholm University

Dag Hjalmar Agne Carl Hammarskjöld (/ˈhæmərʃʊld/ HAM-ər-shuuld; Swedish: [ˈdɑːɡ ˈhâmːarˌɧœld]; 29 July 1905 – 18 September 1961) was a Swedish economist and diplomat who served as the second Secretary-General of the United Nations from April 1953 until his death in a plane crash in September 1961. As of 2026, he remains the youngest person to have held the post, having been 47 years old when he was elected. He was a son of Hjalmar Hammarskjöld, who served as Prime Minister of Sweden from 1914 to 1917.

Hammarskjöld's tenure was characterized by efforts to strengthen the newly-formed UN both internally and externally. He led initiatives to improve morale and organizational efficiency while seeking to make the UN more responsive to global issues. He presided over the creation of the first UN peacekeeping forces in Egypt (the UNEF) and the Congo (the ONUC) and personally intervened to defuse or resolve diplomatic crises. Hammarskjöld's second term was cut short when he died in a plane crash while en route to cease-fire negotiations during the Congo Crisis.

Hammarskjöld was and remains well regarded internationally as a capable diplomat and administrator, and his efforts to resolve various global crises led to him being the only posthumous recipient of the Nobel Peace Prize. In the Western world, his appointment and tenure were hailed as one of the most notable and successful in UN leadership. U.S. president John F. Kennedy called Hammarskjöld "the greatest statesman of our century". In the Democratic Republic of Congo and broader Global South, however, his legacy is extremely controversial, given his erratic performance in the Congo Crisis, with consequences to this day.

== Early life and education ==
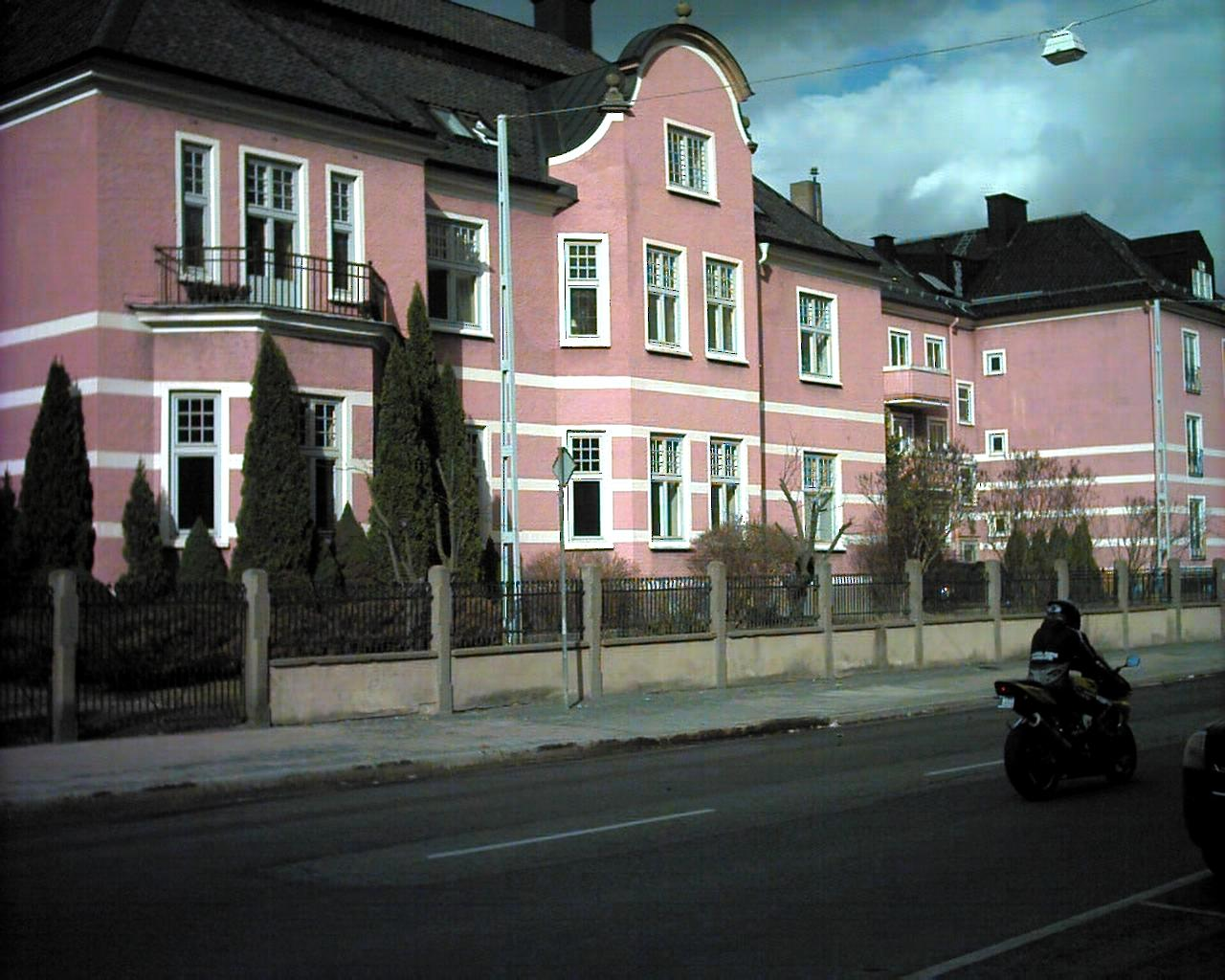
Hammarskjöld's birthplace in Jönköping

Dag Hammarskjöld was born in Jönköping to the noble family Hammarskjöld (also spelled Hammarskiöld or Hammarsköld). He spent most of his childhood in Uppsala. His home there, which he considered his childhood home, was Uppsala Castle. He was the fourth and youngest son of Hjalmar Hammarskjöld, Prime Minister of Sweden from 1914 to 1917, and Agnes Hammarskjöld.

Hammarskjöld studied first at Katedralskolan and then at Uppsala University. By January 1930, he had obtained Licentiate of Philosophy and Master of Laws degrees. Before he finished his law degree he had already obtained a job as Assistant Secretary of the Unemployment Committee.

== Career ==
From 1930 to 1934, Hammarskjöld was secretary of a governmental committee on unemployment. During this time he wrote his economics thesis, "Konjunkturspridningen" ("The Spread of the Business Cycle"), and received a doctorate from Stockholm University. In 1936, he became a secretary in Sweden's central bank, the Riksbank. From 1941 to 1948, he served as chairman of the Riksbank's General Council.

Hammarskjöld quickly developed a successful career as a Swedish public servant. He was state secretary in the Ministry of Finance (1936–1945), Swedish delegate to the Organization for European Economic Cooperation (1947–1953), cabinet secretary for the Ministry of Foreign Affairs (1949–1951), and minister without portfolio in Tage Erlander's government (1951–1953).

He helped coordinate government plans to alleviate the economic problems of the post-World War II period and was a delegate to the Paris conference that established the Marshall Plan. In 1950, he became head of the Swedish delegation to UNISCAN, a forum to promote economic cooperation between the United Kingdom and the Scandinavian countries. Although Hammarskjöld served in a cabinet dominated by the Social Democrats, he never officially joined any political party.

In 1951, Hammarskjöld was vice chairman of the Swedish delegation to the United Nations General Assembly in Paris. He became the chairman of the Swedish delegation to the General Assembly in New York in 1952. On 20 December 1954, he was elected to take his father's vacated seat in the Swedish Academy.

== United Nations Secretary-General ==
=== Nomination and election ===
On 10 November 1952, Trygve Lie announced his resignation as Secretary-General of the United Nations. Several months of negotiations ensued between the Western powers and the Soviet Union without reaching an agreement on his successor. On 13 and 19 March 1953, the Security Council voted on four candidates. Lester B. Pearson of Canada was the only candidate to receive the required majority, but he was vetoed by the Soviet Union. At a consultation of the permanent members on 30 March 1953, French permanent representative Henri Hoppenot suggested four candidates, including Hammarskjöld, whom he had met at the Organisation for European Economic Cooperation.

The superpowers hoped to seat a Secretary-General who would focus on administrative issues and refrain from participating in political discussion. Hammarskjöld's reputation at the time was, in the words of biographer Emery Kelèn, "that of a brilliant economist, an unobtrusive technician, and an aristo-bureaucrat". As a result, there was little to no controversy in his selection; the Soviet permanent representative, Valerian Zorin, found Hammarskjöld "harmless". Zorin declared that he would be voting for Hammarskjöld, surprising the Western powers. The announcement set off a flurry of diplomatic activity. British Foreign Secretary Anthony Eden was strongly in favor of Hammarskjöld and asked the United States to "take any appropriate action to induce the [Nationalist] Chinese to abstain". (Sweden recognized the People's Republic of China and faced a potential veto from the Republic of China.) At the U.S. State Department, the nomination "came as a complete surprise to everyone here and we started scrambling around to find out who Mr. Hammarskjold was and what his qualifications were". The State Department authorized Henry Cabot Lodge Jr., the US Ambassador, to vote in favor after he told them that Hammarskjöld "may be as good as we can get".

Journalist: "We understand you've been designated Secretary-General of the United Nations."
Hammarskjöld: "This April Fool's Day joke is in extremely bad taste: it's nonsense!"

— Exchange between a Stockholm journalist and Hammarskjöld, 1 April 1953

On 31 March 1953, the Security Council voted 10–0–1 to recommend Hammarskjöld to the General Assembly, with an abstention from Nationalist China. The vote was conducted in secret, and Hammarskjöld was unaware his name had been put forward for the position. Shortly after midnight on 1 April 1953, Hammarskjöld was awakened by a telephone call from a journalist with the news, which he dismissed as an April Fool's Day joke. (Note: The nomination was leaked early by a delegate of the Security Council, who informed a correspondent of the vote as they left the council chamber to go to the restroom. Earlier in March, Hammarskjöld had discussed the succession problem of the UN Secretariat with artist Bo Beskow. When Beskow suggested that Hammarskjöld would be suitable for the office, the latter replied, "Nobody is crazy enough to propose me—and I would be crazy to accept.") He finally believed the news after the third phone call. The Swedish mission in New York confirmed the nomination at 03:00 and a communique from the Security Council was soon thereafter delivered to him. After consulting with the Swedish cabinet and his father, Hammarskjöld decided to accept the nomination. He sent a wire to the Security Council:

With strong feeling personal insufficiency I hesitate to accept candidature but I do not feel I could refuse to assume the task imposed on me should the [UN General] Assembly follow the recommendation of the Security Council by which I feel deeply honoured.

Later in the day, Hammarskjöld held a press conference at the Swedish Foreign Ministry. According to diplomat Sverker Åström, he displayed an intense interest and knowledge in the affairs of the UN, which he had never shown any indication of before.

The UN General Assembly voted 57–1–1 (the lone vote against came from Nationalist China) on 7 April 1953 to appoint Dag Hammarskjöld as Secretary-General of the United Nations. Hammarskjöld was sworn in as Secretary-General on 10 April 1953. He was unanimously reelected on 26 September 1957 for another term, taking effect on 10 April 1958.

=== Tenure ===
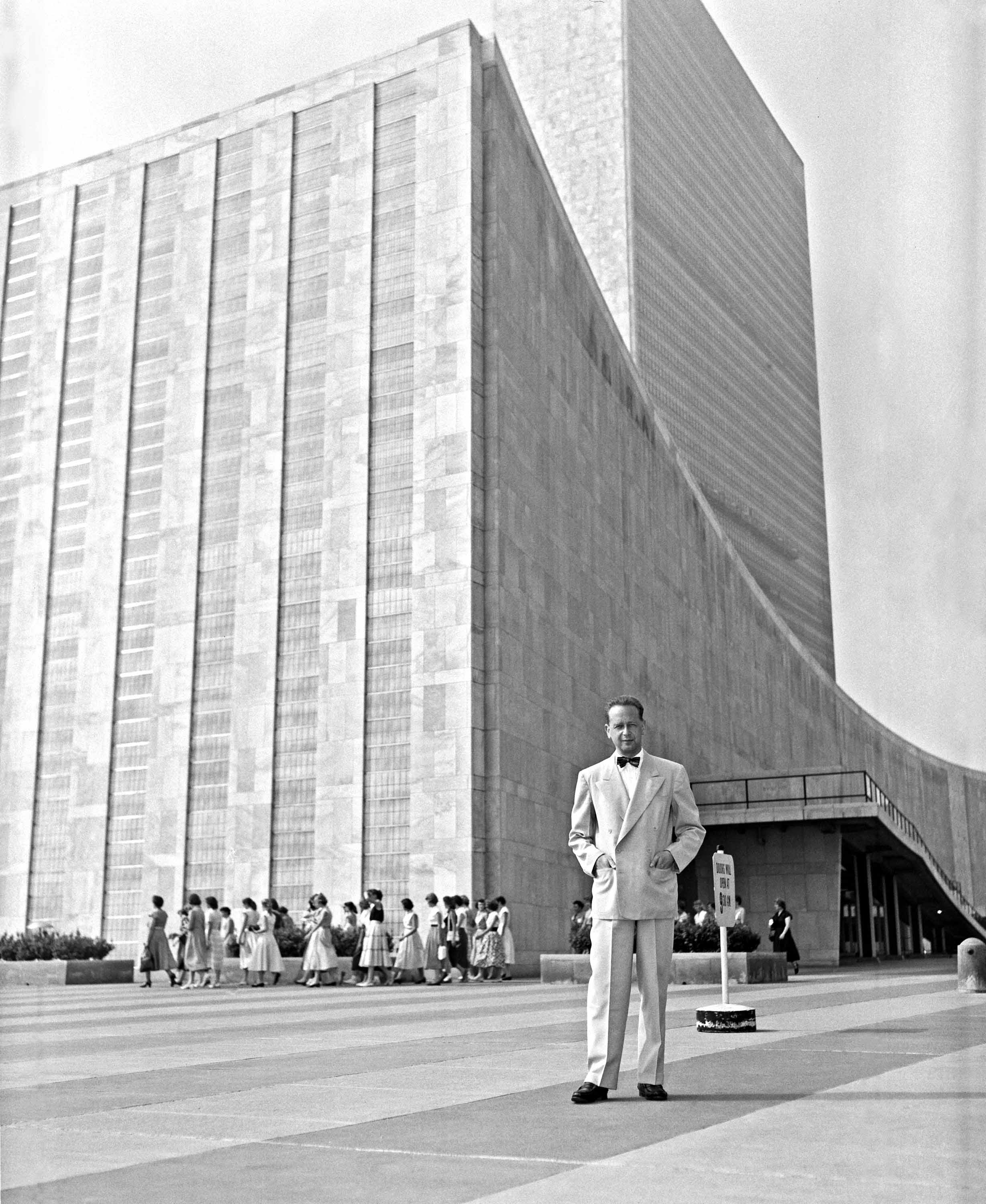
Hammarskjöld (age 48) outside the UN headquarters in New York City, 1953

Immediately following the assumption of the Secretariat, Hammarskjöld attempted to establish a good rapport with his staff. He made a point of visiting every UN department to shake hands with as many workers as possible, eating in the cafeteria as often as possible, and relinquishing the Secretary-General's private elevator for general use. He began his term by establishing his own secretariat of 4,000 administrators and setting up regulations that defined their responsibilities. He was also actively engaged in smaller projects relating to the UN working environment; for example, he spearheaded the building of a meditation room at the UN headquarters, where people can withdraw into themselves in silence, regardless of their faith, creed, or religion.

During his term, Hammarskjöld tried to improve relations between Israel and the Arab states, frequently playing the role of a mediator between David Ben-Gurion and Gamal Abdel Nasser. Other highlights include a 1955 visit to China to negotiate the release of 11 captured US pilots who had served in the Korean War, the 1956 establishment of the United Nations Emergency Force, and his intervention in the 1956 Suez Crisis. He is given credit by some historians for allowing participation of the Holy See within the UN that year.

In 1960, the newly independent Congo asked for UN aid in defusing the Congo Crisis. In July of that year, the UN established its first peacekeeping mission, the United Nations Operation in the Congo (known by its French abbreviation ONUC), which peaked at nearly 20,000 military personnel primarily from India, Ireland and Sweden and remains among the UN's largest operations in size and scope. ONUC's mandate sought to restore order in Congo-Kinshasa and to keep other nations, namely Belgium, out of the crisis. During this time Hammarskjöld made four trips to Congo, but his efforts toward the decolonisation of Africa were considered insufficient by the Soviet Union. Hammarskjöld publicly justified the UN’s refusal to act decisively against the Katanga secession on the ground of non-intervention, arguing that the issue was an internal Congolese political conflict. However, this position was widely disputed, especially because Katanga’s secession was closely linked to Belgian official and private interests from the beginning. Later UN documents themselves noted the extensive Belgian influence in Katanga’s civilian and security administration. In September 1960, the Soviet government denounced his decision to send a UN emergency force to keep the peace. They demanded his resignation and the replacement of the office of Secretary-General by a three-man directorate with a built-in veto, the "troika". The objective was, citing the memoirs of Soviet leader Nikita Khrushchev, to "equally represent interests of three groups of countries: capitalist, socialist and recently independent".

Hammarskjöld's refusal to place peacekeepers in the service of Lumumba's constitutionally elected government provoked a strong reaction of disapproval from the Soviets. Declassified documents suggest that Hammarskjöld and senior UN officials were not politically neutral in the Congo crisis. Privately, Hammarskjöld viewed Lumumba as an obstacle, communicated such views to American and British officials, and reportedly supported efforts to weaken or replace him while avoiding open extra-constitutional intervention. UN actions during the conflict also favoured President Kasavubu against Lumumba, and Hammarskjöld maintained close contact with US and British officials, sharing confidential ONUC information and advising them on Congo policy. The situation would become more scandalous with the assassination of Lumumba by Tshombe's troops. In February 1961, the UN authorized the Peacekeeping Forces to use military force to prevent civil war. The Blue Helmets' attack on Katanga caused Tshombe to flee to Zambia. Hammarskjöld's erratic attitude in not providing support to Lumumba's government, which had been elected by popular vote, drew severe criticism among non-aligned countries and communist and socialist countries. Hammarskjöld knew that the Belgian Government, allegedly supported by the United States, arranged for the assassination of Patrice Lumumba. In the end, his actions were supported only by the United States and Belgium.

His final report to the United Nations was some 6,000 words and is considered to be one of his most important. The report was dictated in a single afternoon to his assistant, Hannah Platz.

== Death ==
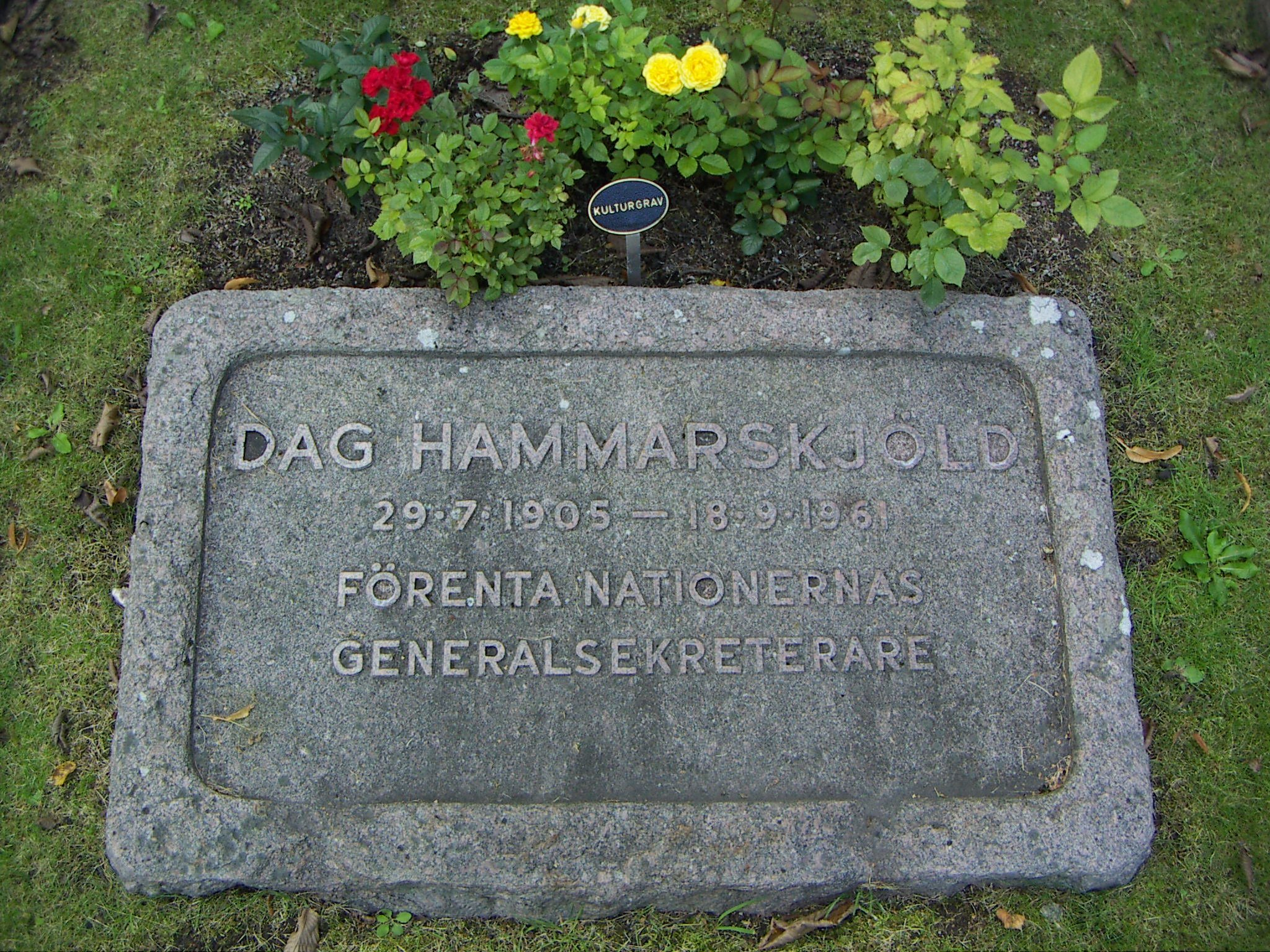
Hammarskjöld's grave in Uppsala

On 18 September 1961, Hammarskjöld was en route to negotiate a cease-fire between United Nations Operation in the Congo forces and Katangese troops under Moise Tshombe. His Douglas DC-6 airliner SE-BDY crashed near Ndola, Northern Rhodesia (now Zambia). Hammarskjöld perished as a result of the crash, as did all of the 15 other passengers. Hammarskjöld's death set off a succession crisis at the United Nations, because there was no line of succession and as a result, the Security Council had to vote on a successor.

The circumstances of the crash are still unclear. A 1962 Rhodesian inquiry concluded that pilot error was to blame, while a later UN investigation could not determine the cause of the crash. There is witness testimony suggesting the plane was shot down. A KGB report claimed the CIA was responsible.

The day after the crash, former U.S. President Harry Truman commented that Hammarskjöld "was on the point of getting something done when they killed him. Notice that I said 'when they killed him'."

In 1998, documents were discovered that detailed an alleged plot, named Operation Celeste, to assassinate Hammarskjöld. The alleged plot was backed by the CIA, MI6 and a Belgian mining interest and the assassination was to be carried out by the South African Institute for Maritime Research, a South African paramilitary organisation. One of the documents stated that CIA director Allen Dulles agreed that "Dag is becoming troublesome ... and should be removed" and pledged local CIA support for the alleged plot. The information was contained in a file that the South African National Intelligence Agency turned over to the South African Truth and Reconciliation Commission in relation to the 1993 assassination of Chris Hani, leader of the South African Communist Party. The authenticity of the documents could not be substantiated because they were copies instead of originals. More documents related to the alleged plot were discovered by the South African government in 2016.

In 2011, Göran Björkdahl, a Swedish aid worker whose father worked for the UN in Zambia, wrote that in part, he believed that Hammarskjöld's death was a murder that was committed to benefit mining companies like Union Minière, after Hammarskjöld had made the UN intervene in the Katanga crisis. Björkdahl based his assertion on interviews with witnesses of the plane crash near the border of the DRC with Zambia and on archival documents.

In 2013, accident investigator Sven Hammarberg was asked by the International Commission of Jurists to investigate Hammarskjöld's death. His report concluded that the accident was a result of controlled flight into terrain due an erroneous approach chart which omitted a large hill west of Ngolo, that the original Rhodesian investigation had missed.

In 2014, newly declassified documents revealed that the American ambassador to the Congo sent a cable to Washington D.C. and in it, he wrote his suspicion that the plane could have been shot down by Belgian mercenary pilot Jan Van Risseghem, commander of the small Katanga Air Force. Van Risseghem died in 2007.

On 16 March 2015, United Nations Secretary-General Ban Ki-moon appointed members to an Independent Panel of Experts that was established for the purpose of examining new information that was related to Hammarskjöld's death. The three-member panel was led by Mohamed Chande Othman, the Chief Justice of Tanzania, and it included Kerryn Macaulay (Australia's representative to the International Civil Aviation Organization) and Henrik Larsen (a ballistics expert from the Danish National Police). The panel's 99-page report, released 6 July 2015, assigned moderate value to nine new eyewitness accounts and transcripts of radio transmissions. Those accounts suggested that Hammarskjöld's plane was already on fire as it was landing and they also suggested that other jet aircraft and other intelligence agents were nearby.

In 2016, the original documents from the 1998 South African investigation surfaced. Those who were familiar with the investigation cautioned that even if they were authentic, the documents could have initially been authored as part of a disinformation campaign.

In 2019, the documentary film Cold Case Hammarskjöld by Danish filmmaker Mads Brügger claimed that Jan van Risseghem had told a friend that he shot down Hammarskjöld's aircraft. This went against the official stance maintained by van Risseghem's family that he was not involved in the death of Hammarskjöld. According to an interview with van Risseghem's wife, he was in Rhodesia negotiating the purchase of a plane for the Katanga Air Force, with the logbooks proving that he was not flying for Katanga at the time. The documentary crew interviewed colleagues of van Risseghem's for the film, all of whom supported their theory. In an interview with Swedish historian Leif Hellström, van Risseghem claimed that he was not in southern Africa at the time the crash happened, and dismissed the idea of his involvement.

In 2020, journalist Ravi Somaiya published the book The Golden Thread: The Cold War and the Mysterious Death of Dag Hammarskjöld where he argues that it was no doubt murder.

In 2022 the book The Death of Dag Hammarskjöld: How the Cold War Turned an Accident into an Assassination was published by author Steven Webb, with a foreword from Sven Hammarberg. It references his 2013 accident investigation, among other sources, concluding that Hammarskjöld's aircraft crashed due to a controlled flight into terrain. It also discusses the many conspiracy theories about the incident and their motivations.

A document that was found in France amidst the Fonds Foccart (National Archives in Pierrefitte) in November 2021 is a death warrant for Hammarskjöld that contained the acronym OAS, the secret organization that was nestled in the French army at the time of Algeria's war for independence. The document reads: "It is high time to put an end to his harmful intrusion ... this sentence common to justice and fairness to be carried out, as soon as possible". The unsigned document is a facsimile that appeared to be a transcription of an original letter.

Hammarskjöld's 1959 will left his personal archive to the National Library of Sweden.

== Personal life ==
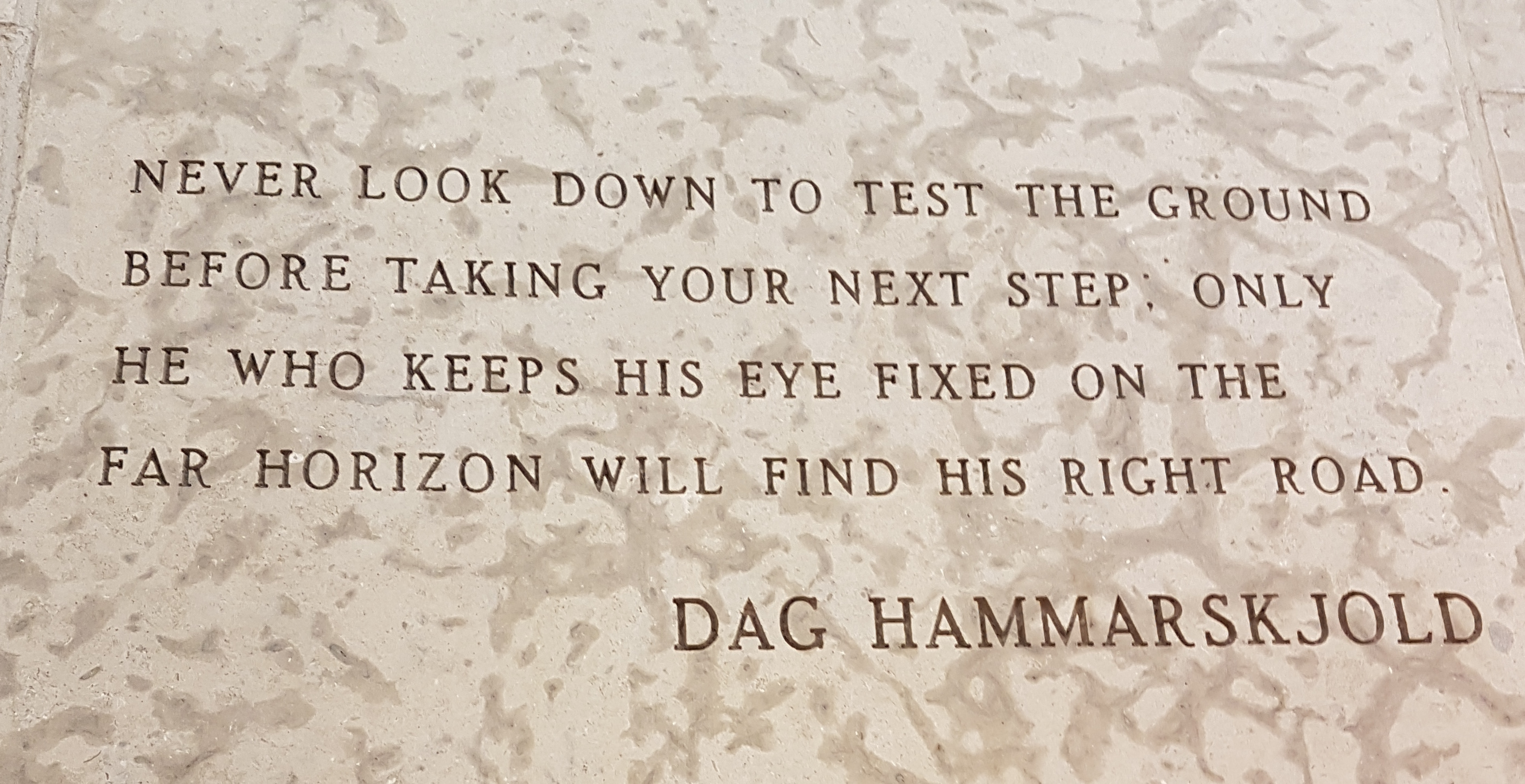
A spiritual quote by Dag Hammarskjöld engraved in the stone wall within the Peace Chapel of the International Peace Garden

In 1953, soon after his appointment as United Nations Secretary-General, Hammarskjöld was interviewed on radio by Edward R. Murrow. In the talk, Hammarskjöld declared:

But the explanation of how a man should live a life of active social service in full harmony with himself as a member of the community of spirit, I found in the writings of those great medieval mystics [Meister Eckhart and Jan van Ruysbroek] for whom 'self-surrender' had been the way to self-realization, and who in 'singleness of mind' and 'inwardness' had found the strength to say yes to every demand which the needs of their neighbours made them face, and to say yes also to every fate life had in store for them when they followed the call of duty as they understood it.

Hammarskjöld's only book, Vägmärken (Markings, or more literally Waymarks), was published in 1963. A collection of his diary reflections, the book starts in 1925, when he was 20 years old, and ends the month before his death in 1961. This diary was found in his New York house, after his death, along with an undated letter addressed to then Swedish Permanent Under-Secretary for Foreign Affairs, Leif Belfrage. In this letter, Hammarskjöld wrote: "These entries provide the only true 'profile' that can be drawn ... If you find them worth publishing, you have my permission to do so." The foreword is written by the English poet W. H. Auden, a friend of Hammarskjöld.

Markings was described by the late theologian Henry P. Van Dusen as "the noblest self-disclosure of spiritual struggle and triumph, perhaps the greatest testament of personal faith written ... in the heat of professional life and amidst the most exacting responsibilities for world peace and order". Hammarskjöld wrote, for example:

We are not permitted to choose the frame of our destiny. But what we put into it is ours. He who wills adventure will experience it – according to the measure of his courage. He who wills sacrifice will be sacrificed – according to the measure of his purity of heart.

Markings is characterised by Hammarskjöld's intermingling of prose and haiku poetry in a manner exemplified by the 17th-century Japanese poet Basho in his Narrow Roads to the Deep North. In his foreword to Markings, W. H. Auden quotes Hammarskjöld as stating: "In our age, the road to holiness necessarily passes through the world of action."

Hammarskjöld's interest in philosophical and spiritual matters is also proven by the finding of Martin Buber's main work I and Thou, which he was translating into Swedish, in the wreckage after the plane crash.

The Evangelical Lutheran Church in America commemorates the life of Hammarskjöld as a renewer of society on the anniversary of his death, 18 September.

Brian Urquhart's biography of Hammarskjöld addressed what Israel Shenker described in his The New York Times review as "the oft-discussed question of Hammaskjöld's sexuality". Urquhart reports that Trygve Lie spread rumours of Hammarskjöld's homosexuality but, having interviewed Hammarskjöld's close friends, Urquhart concludes that "no one who knew him well or worked closely with him thought he was a homosexual". Shenker infers from Urquhart's work "that Hammarskjöld was an example, not unique in contemporary politics, of an asexual, somewhat narcissistic individual" and quoted private papers where Hammarskjöld had written that "the Secretary General of the UN should have an iron constitution and should not be married". Despite Urquhart concluding the rumours were inaccurate, Larry Kramer included Hammarskjöld in the "I belong to a culture" speech in his 1985 play The Normal Heart.

== Legacy ==
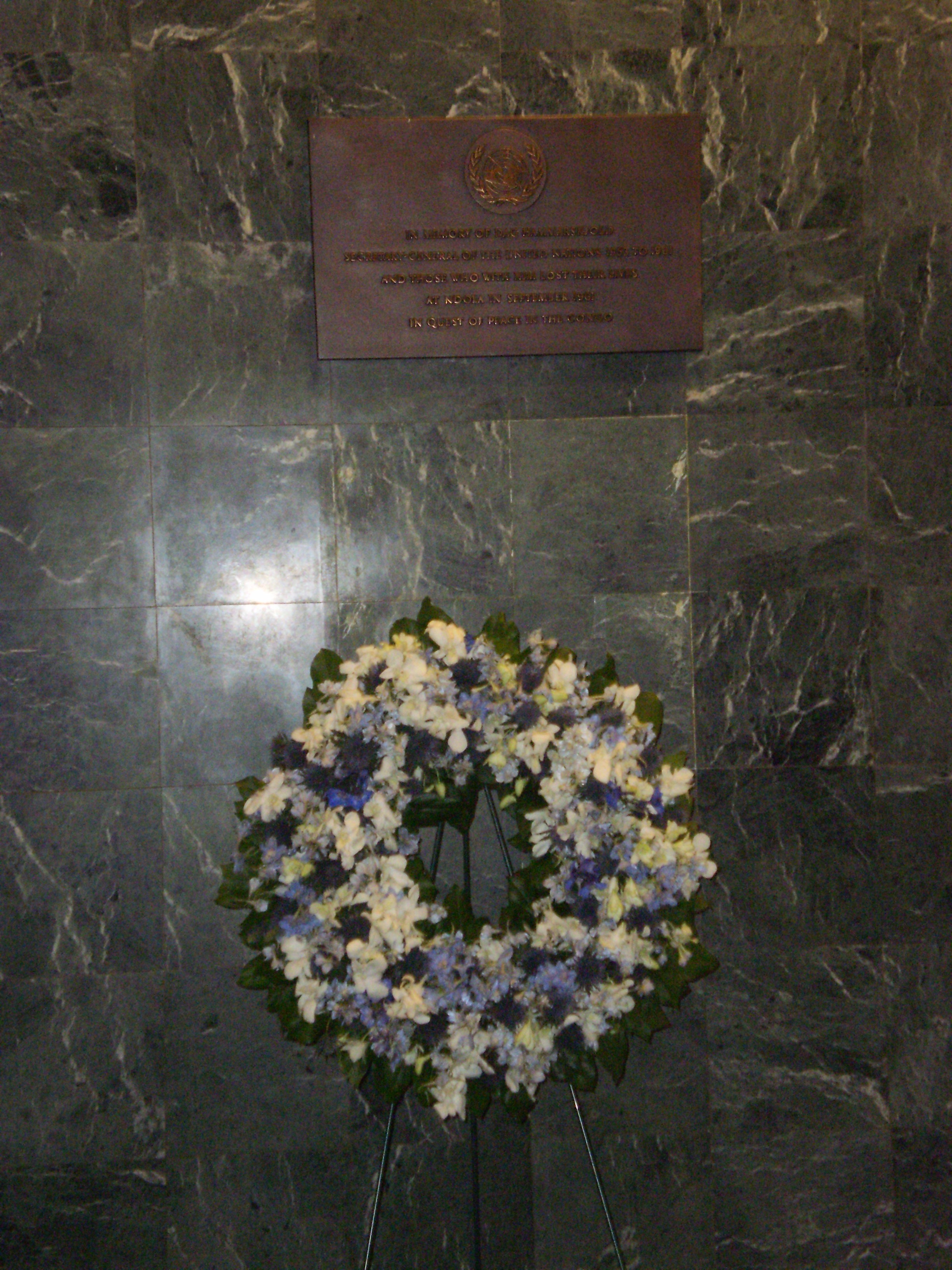
Memorial at the United Nations Headquarters in New York City

=== Honors ===
- Honorary degrees: Carleton University in Ottawa (then called Carleton College) awarded its first-ever honorary degree to Hammarskjöld in 1954, when it presented him with a Legum Doctor, honoris causa. The university has continued this tradition by conferring an honorary doctorate upon every subsequent Secretary-General of the United Nations. He also held honorary degrees from Oxford University, United Kingdom; in the United States from Harvard, Yale, Princeton, Columbia, the University of Pennsylvania, Amherst, Johns Hopkins, the University of California, and Ohio University; in Sweden, Uppsala University; and in Canada from McGill University as well as Carleton University, in Ottawa.

=== People's views ===
- John F. Kennedy: After Hammarskjöld's death, U.S. president John F. Kennedy regretted that he had opposed the UN policy in the Congo and said: "I realise now that in comparison to him, I am a small man. He was the greatest statesman of our century."
- In 2011, The Financial Times wrote that Hammarskjöld has remained the benchmark against which later UN Secretaries-General have been judged.
- His legacy in the third world is extremely controversial, especially due to his statements to the British representative at the UN, Patrick Dean, that Lumumba was "a communist puppet". For the Democratic Republic of Congo, its erratic performance in the crisis of the 1960s has had disastrous consequences for the country to this day.

=== Structures named in honor of Dag Hammarskjöld ===
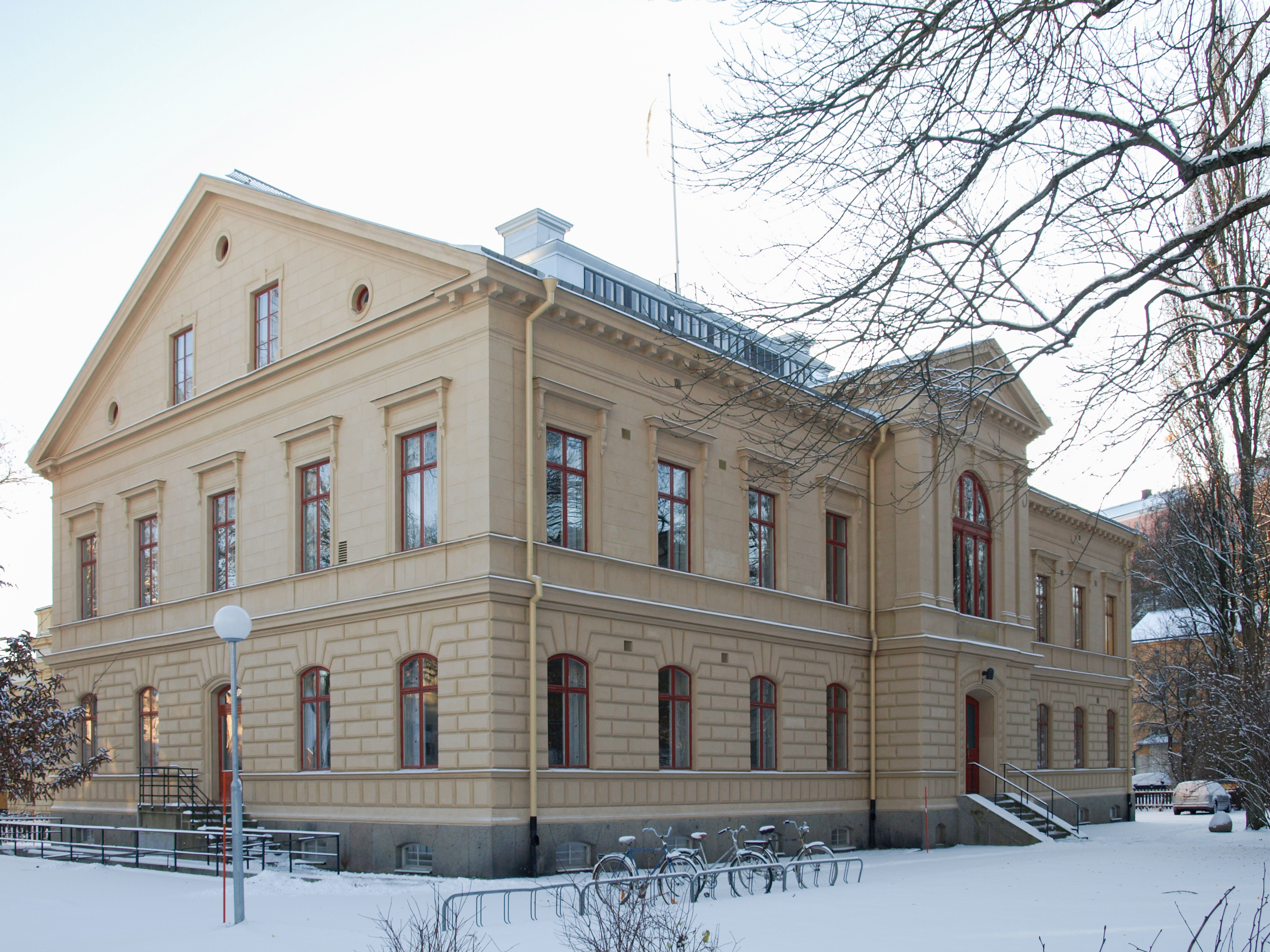
Uppsala University's Dag Hammarskjöld Law Library

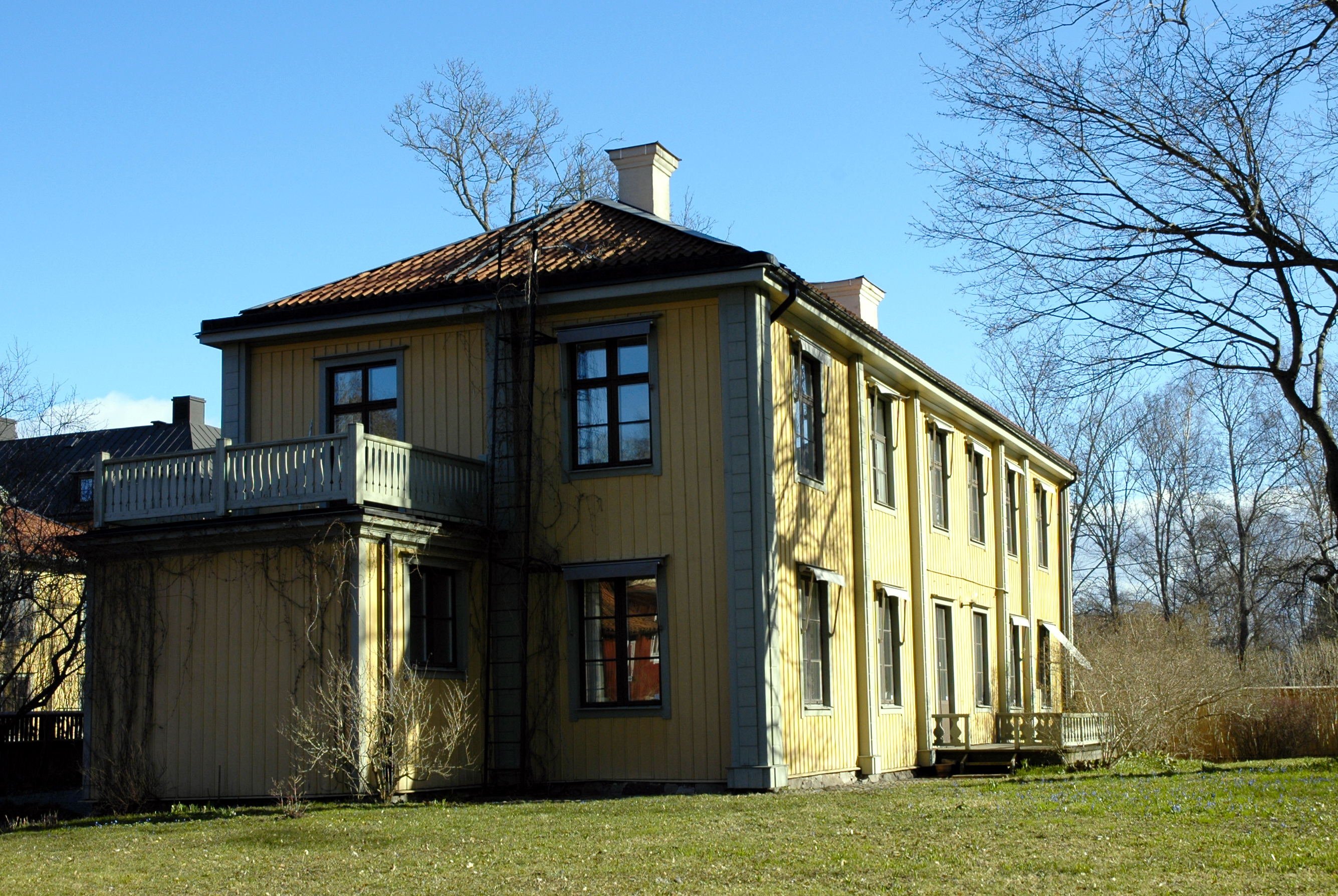
The Dag Hammarskjöld centre in Uppsala

- Buildings and rooms:
  - Dag Hammarskjöld Library: On 16 November 1961, shortly after his death, the newly completed Library building at United Nations Headquarters in New York was named the Dag Hammarskjöld Library.
  - Stanford University: Dag Hammarskjöld House, on the Stanford University campus, is a residence cooperative for undergraduate and graduate students with international backgrounds and interests at Stanford.
  - Hammarskjold High School: Public high school located in the city of Thunder Bay, Ontario, Canada.
  - Hammarskjold Middle School: Public middle school located in the town of East Brunswick, New Jersey.
  - Dag Hammarskjold Middle School: Public middle school located in the town of Wallingford, Connecticut.
  - Dag Hammarskjöld Elementary School: Public elementary school located in Sheepshead Bay, Brooklyn, New York.
  - Dag Hammarskjöld Memorial Primary School: Government School located in Ndola, Zambia (adjacent to the Dag Hammarskjöld Memorial Crash Site). This School contains the Karl Eriksson Computer Lab (Hammarskjöld and Eriksson knew each other).
  - Dag Hammarskjöld Stadium: Stadium located in Ndola, Zambia
  - Dag Hammarskjöld "Hammar" Residence: Waterloo Co-operative Residence (WCRI) building located in the town of Waterloo, Ontario, Canada.
  - Dag-Hammerskjöld-Hof: A municipal housing estate (Gemeindebau) in Vienna, Austria.
- Streets:
  - Dag Hammarskjöld Drive in Ndola, Zambia
  - Dag Hammarskjöld Avenue in United Nations Santiago Complex that connects ECLAC headquarters and other UN system organizations with President Kennedy Avenue in Vitacura, Chile.
  - de:Hammarskjöldplatz is the wide square to the north entrance of the Messe Berlin fairgrounds in Berlin, Germany.
  - Hammarskjöldring is a street in Frankfurt, Germany, connecting the boroughs Mertonviertel and Niederursel.
  - Dag Hammarskjölds Alle is a street in Copenhagen, Denmark that connects the inner city with the affluent suburb of Østerbro.
  - Dag Hammarskjølds Gade is a street in Aalborg, Denmark. Headquarters for the regional police, Nordjyllands Politi, are located here.
  - Dag Hammarskjöldsleden is a traffic route in Gothenburg, Sweden between Linnéplatsen and Västerleden/Söderleden (E6.20). With a length of 5 km, it also connects to Högsboleden .
  - Hammarskjöldsingel is a street in Amstelveen, Netherlands.
- Dag Hammarskjöld Plaza is a public park near the headquarters of the United Nations in New York City.

=== Other commemorations ===
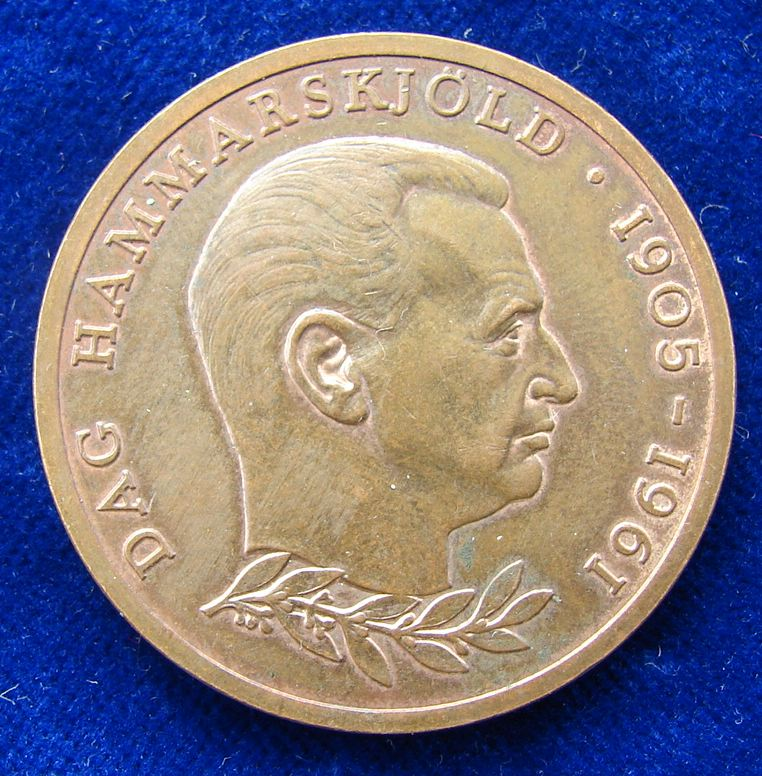
1962 Medal Dag Hammarskjöld by the Danish sculptor Harald Salomon

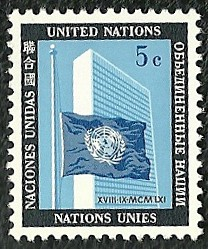
UN flag at half-mast

- Dag Hammarskjöld Foundation: In 1962, the Dag Hammarskjöld Foundation was created as Sweden's national memorial to Dag Hammarskjöld.
- Memorial awards:
  - Nobel Peace Prize: The Nobel Foundation posthumously awarded Dag Hammarskjöld the 1961 Nobel Peace Prize for developing the UN according to the UN Charter.
  - Medal: On 22 July 1997, the UN Security Council Resolution 1121 established the Dag Hammarskjöld Medal in recognition and commemoration of those who have lost their lives as a result of UN peacekeeping operations.
  - Prize in Peace and Conflict Studies: Colgate University annually awards a student the Dag Hammarskjöld Prize in Peace and Conflict Studies based on outstanding work in the program.
- Postage stamps: Many countries issued postage stamps commemorating Hammarskjöld.
- On 6 April 2011, Sweden's central bank, the Riksbank, announced that Hammarskjöld's image would be used on the 1000-kronor banknote, the highest-denomination banknote in Sweden. The new currency was introduced in 2015.

== Depictions in music and popular culture ==
In 1974, the Australian-British composer Malcolm Williamson, Master of the Queen's Music, wrote his Hammarskjöld Portrait for soprano and string orchestra. The text was taken from Vägmärken, and the work's first performance took place on 30 July 1974, at a Royal Albert Hall Proms Concert, with the soprano Elisabeth Söderström, and the BBC Symphony Orchestra conducted by John Pritchard.

In 1985, Hammerskjöld was one of the names mentioned in the "I Belong to a Culture" speech in Larry Kramer's play The Normal Heart, where the protagonist includes him in a list of 24 historical gay figures.

In the 2016 film The Siege of Jadotville, depicting the events of the Congo Crisis, Hammarskjöld's plane (incorrectly a DC-4) is purposely shot down by a fighter jet only used by American forces at the time (it's likely this was for production reasons, just as a DC-4 stood in for the DC-6). Hammarskjöld is played by fellow Swede, Mikael Persbrandt.

Also in 2016, the 1961 Ndola Transair Sweden DC-6 crash was featured in Canadian TV series Mayday (S15, E5), "Deadly Mission" and Air Crash Investigation Special Report (S3, E3), "VIP on Board". Peter James Howarth portrayed Hammarskjöld.

In 2023, Persbrandt again played the eponymous politician, in the film Hammarskjöld, directed by Per Fly. The film received negative reviews for glossing over its Congo Crisis controversies.

In 2024, Hammarskjöld appears as a central character in the Belgian Oscar-nominated documentary Soundtrack to a Coup d'Etat directed by Johan Grimonprez. On an interview for Belgian magazine Glean the filmmaker mentions the discoveries made by writer Ludo De Witte published in the book The Assassination of Patrice Lumumba : "He was able to gather a lot of evidence from United Nations cables and cables within Belgium that suggested that Dag Hammarskjold and the Belgian monarchy were indeed complicit in the downfall of Lumumba."

He is depicted in the 2026 movie The Swedish Connection, played by Christoffer Nordenrot, during the events leading up to the Rescue of the Danish Jews.

== See also ==
- List of unsolved deaths
- List of heads of state and government who died in aviation accidents and incidents

== Bibliography ==
- Durel, Bernard, op, (2002), «Au jardin secret d'un diplomate suédois: Jalons de Dag Hammarskjöld, un itinéraire spirituel», La Vie Spirituelle (Paris). T. 82, pp. 901–922.
- Foote, Wilder ed. (1962) Servant of Peace: A Selection of the Speeches and Statements of Dag Hammarskjold, Secretary-General of the United Nations 1953–1961. The Bodley Head, London.
- Goodwin, Ralph R., ed. (1979), United Nations Affairs, Foreign Relations of the United States, 1952–1954, vol. 3, Washington D.C.: United States Government Printing Office.
- Heller, Peter B. (2001). The United Nations under Dag Hammarskjöld, 1953–1961. Scarecrow Press. ISBN 978-1-4617-0209-2.
- Kelen, Emery (1966) Hammarskjold. Putnam.
- Lichello, Robert (1972) "Dag Hammarskjöld: A Giant in Diplomacy." Samhar Press, Charlotteville, N.Y. ISBN 978-0-87157-501-2.
- Lipsey, Roger (2013). Hammarskjöld: A Life (illustrated ed.). University of Michigan Press. ISBN 978-0-472-11890-8.
- Urquhart, Brian, (1972), Hammarskjold. Alfred A. Knopf, New York.
- Velocci, Giovanni, cssr, (1998), «Hammarskjold Dag», in Luigi Borriello, ocd – Edmondo Caruana, ocarm – Maria Rosaria Del Genio – N. Suffi (dirs.), Dizionario di mistica. Libreria Editrice Vaticana, Città del Vaticano, pp. 624–626.

Cultural offices
Preceded by Hjalmar Hammarskjöld	Swedish Academy, Seat No.17; 1954–1961	Succeeded by Erik Lindegren
Positions in intergovernmental organisations
Preceded by Trygve Lie	United Nations Secretary-General; April 1953 – September 1961	Succeeded by U Thant
Awards and achievements
Preceded by Albert Lutuli	Laureate of the Nobel Peace Prize; 1961	Succeeded by Linus Pauling
