= Branting III cabinet =

Government of Sweden from 1924 to 1925

- Cabinet of Sweden

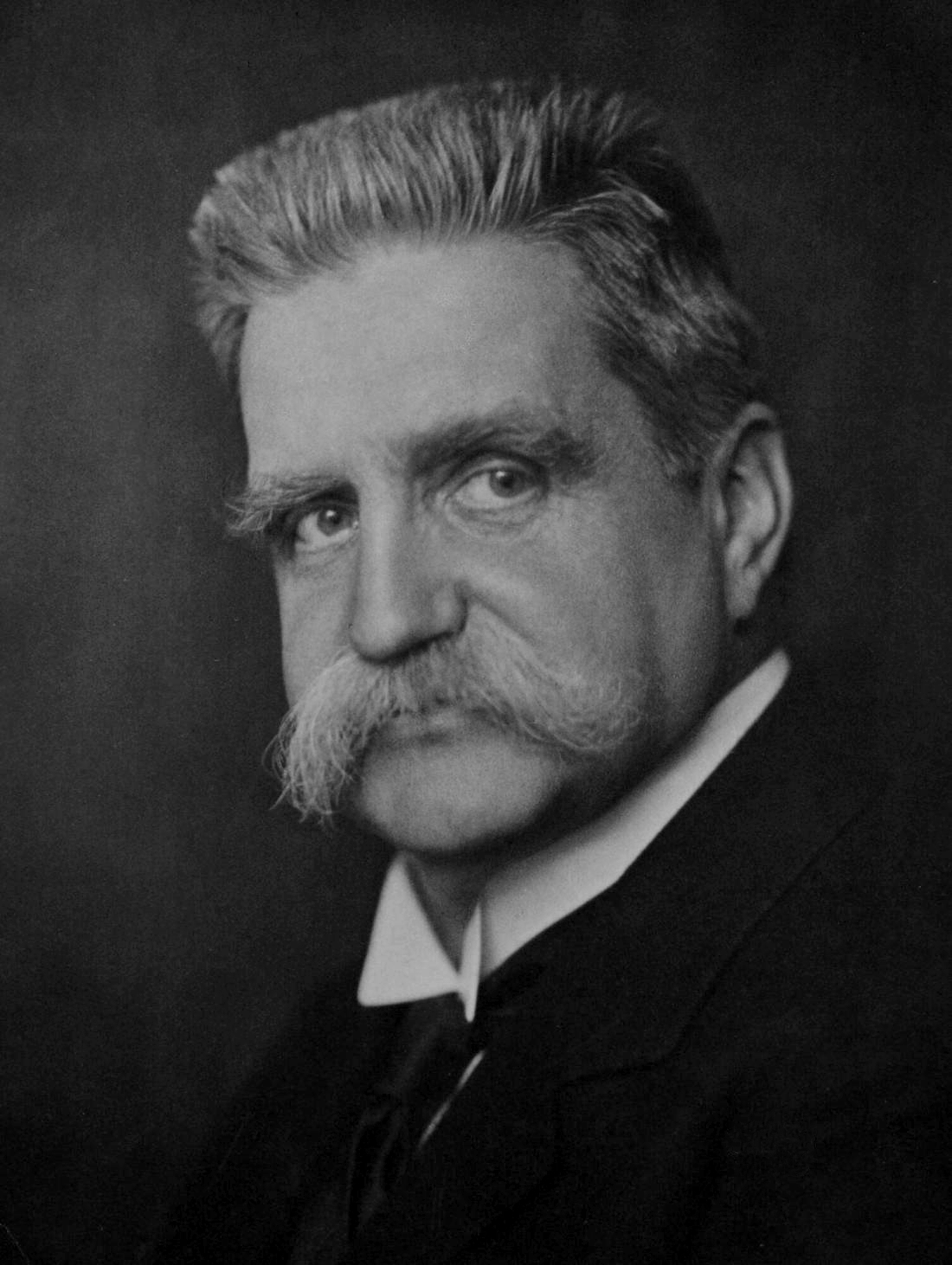
- Prime Minister Hjalmar Branting
- Date formed: 18 October 1924
- Date dissolved: 24 January 1925

People and organisations
- Head of state: Gustav V
- Head of government: Hjalmar Branting
- Member party: Social Democrats
- Status in legislature: Single-party minority (upper & lower house)
- Opposition parties: General Electoral League; Free-Minded National Association; Farmers' League; Liberal Party of Sweden; Communist Party of Sweden; Höglund Communists

History
- Incoming formation: 1924 election
- Outgoing formation: Resignation of Hjalmar Branting
- Election: 1924 election
- Predecessor: Trygger cabinet
- Successor: Sandler cabinet

The Branting III cabinet (Swedish: regeringen Branting III) was the government of Sweden from 18 October 1924 to 24 January 1925. It was a Social Democratic single-party minority government led by Prime Minister Hjalmar Branting.

When the previous cabinet of Ernst Trygger resigned following the 1924 general election, Hjalmar Branting took office as prime minister for the third time. For health reasons, Branting stepped down on 19 January 1925, five weeks before his death on 24 February. Commerce and Industry Minister Rickard Sandler took office in Branting's place.

== Formation ==
After an even election result in the 1924 general election, the Social Democrats got 104 seats in the Riksdag (Swedish parliament), but the Right Party and the Farmers' League also increased theirs. Both sides took votes from the liberals. King Gustaf V had tried to ask Carl Gustaf Ekman to form a government based on the Right Party, but without success. He then turned to Hjalmar Branting, whom declared that he would form a social democratic single-party government, not a coalition government. After many discussions, the party formed this cabinet, with newer and younger names as ministers, excluding older and more known names.

== Ministers ==
Portfolio	Minister	Took office	Left office
Prime Minister's Office
Prime Minister, Head of the Prime Minister's Office	Hjalmar Branting	14 October 1924	24 February 1925
Ministry for Foreign Affairs
Minister for Foreign Affairs, Head of the Ministry for Foreign Affairs	Östen Undén	14 October 1924	24 February 1925
Ministry of Justice
Minister for Justice, Head of the Ministry of Justice	Torsten Nothin	14 October 1924	24 February 1925
Ministry of Defence
Minister for Defence, Head of the Ministry of Defence	Per Albin Hansson	14 October 1924	24 February 1925
Ministry of Health and Social Affairs
Minister for Health and Social Affairs, Head of the Ministry of Health and Social Affairs	Gustav Möller	14 October 1924	24 February 1925
Ministry of Communications
Minister of Communications	Viktor Larsson	14 October 1924	24 February 1925
Ministry of Finance
Minister for Finance	Fredrik Vilhelm Thorsson	14 October 1924	24 February 1925
Ministry of Education and Ecclesiastical Affairs
Minister of Education and Ecclesiastical Affairs	Olof Olsson	14 October 1924	24 February 1925
Ministry of Agriculture
Minister of Agriculture	Sven Linders	14 October 1924	24 February 1925
Ministry of Commerce and Industry
Minister of Commerce and Industry	Rickard Sandler	14 October 1924	24 February 1925
Other Ministers
Konsultativt statsråd	Rickard Sandler	14 October 1924	24 February 1925
Konsultativt statsråd	Ernst Wigforss	14 October 1924	24 February 1925
Konsultativt statsråd	Karl Levinson	14 October 1924	24 February 1925

== Policy ==
The government decreased the fundings of the defence forces.

== Resignation ==
When Prime Minister Branting got ill in November 1924, it was clear that he would not recover. Minister for Finance Fredrik Vilhelm Thorsson were the self-evident successor, but he also got sick. On 19 January 1925, Branting declared his resignation as prime minister. After many discussions in the cabinet, he was succeeded by Minister of Commerce and Industry Rickard Sandler on 22 January.

Preceded by Trygger cabinet	Cabinet of Sweden; 1924–1925	Succeeded by Sandler cabinet
