= Minister for Finance (Sweden) =

Swedish cabinet minister

- Finansminister
- Lesser coat of arms of Sweden

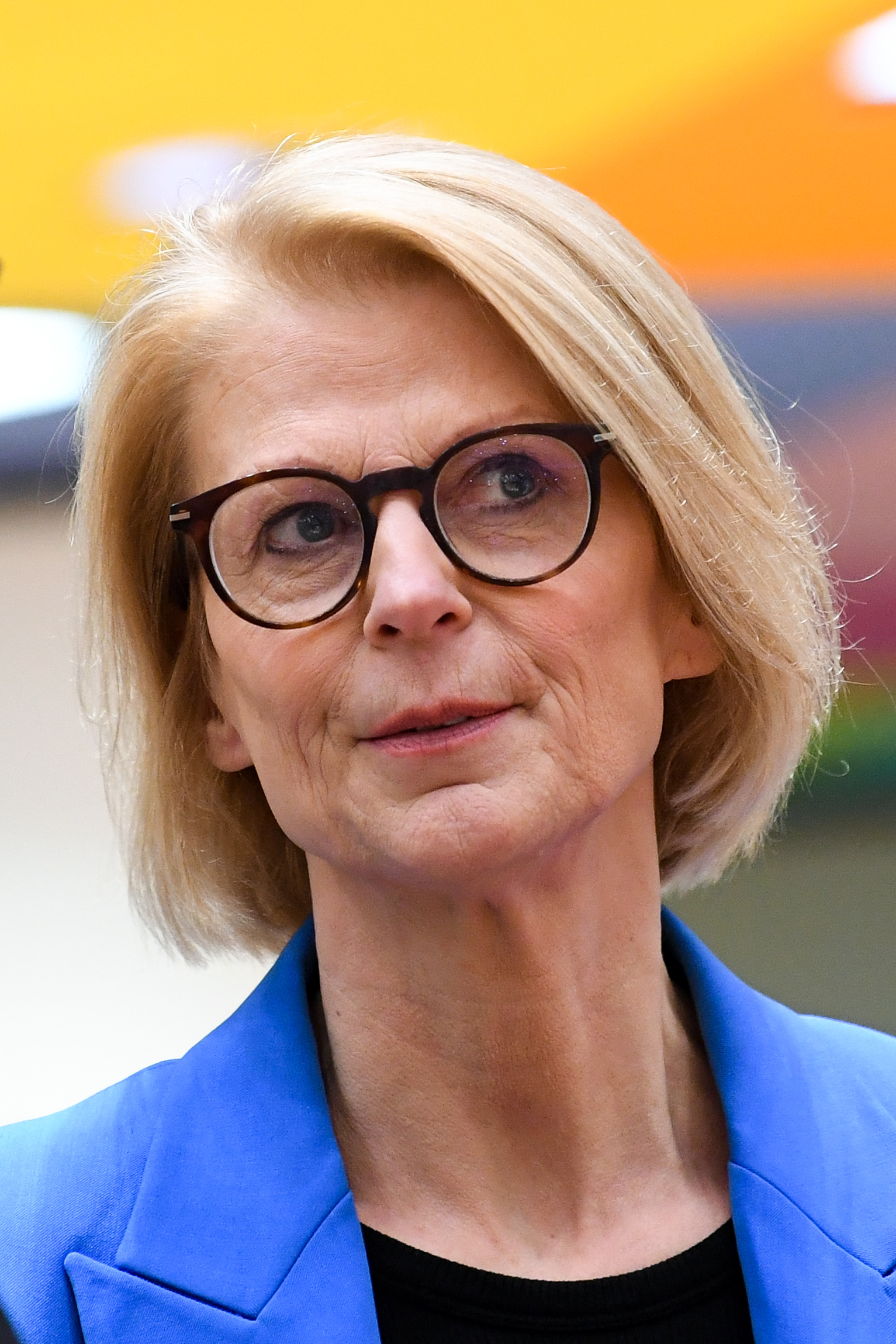
- Incumbent; Elisabeth Svantesson since 18 October 2022
- Ministry of Finance
- Member of: Government of Sweden; National Security Council
- Seat: Stockholm, Sweden
- Appointer: The Prime Minister
- Term length: No fixed term serves at the discretion of the Prime Minister
- Formation: 16 May 1840
- First holder: Johan Didrik af Wingård
- Deputy: State Secretary for Finance
- Website: www.sweden.gov.se/sb/d/2062

The Minister for Finance (Note: Minister for Finance or Minister of Finance.) (Swedish: Finansminister) of Sweden, officially Cabinet Minister and Head of the Ministry of Finance (Swedish: statsråd och chef för finansdepartementet), is a member of the Government of Sweden and is the head of the Ministry of Finance.

It is often considered to be the most influential political office in Sweden, following the Prime Minister.

== List of officeholders ==
Color key

Independent
Historical parties: Lantmanna Moderate National Party Liberals Liberals Liberals Liberals
Present parties: Social Democrats Moderate Centre Left Liberals Christian Democrats Green Sweden Democrats

Status

Denotes acting Minister for Finance

=== Minister for Finance 1840–1976 ===
Portrait	Minister for Finance (Born-Died)	Term			Political Party	Coalition	Cabinet
Portrait	Minister for Finance (Born-Died)	Took office	Left office	Duration	Political Party	Coalition	Cabinet
Johan Didrik af Wingård	Johan Didrik af Wingård (1778–1854)	16 May 1840	29 December 1842	2 years, 227 days	Independent	–	M. Posse I
Sven Munthe	Sven Munthe (1787–1873)	29 December 1842	10 April 1848	5 years, 103 days	Independent	–	Gyllenhaal; Nordenfalk; M. Posse II
Anders Peter Sandströmer	Anders Peter Sandströmer (1804–1857)	10 April 1848	7 January 1851	2 years, 272 days	Independent	–	Sparre
Johan August Gripenstedt	Johan August Gripenstedt (1813–1874); Acting	7 January 1851	21 October 1851	287 days	Independent	–	Sparre
Otto Palmstierna	Otto Palmstierna (1790–1878)	21 October 1851	28 May 1856	4 years, 220 days	Independent	–	Sparre
Johan August Gripenstedt	Johan August Gripenstedt (1813–1874)	28 May 1856	4 July 1866	10 years, 37 days	Independent	–	Günther; De Geer d.ä. I
Gustaf Lagercrantz	Gustaf Lagercrantz (1816–1867)	4 July 1866	31 May 1867	331 days	Independent	–	De Geer d.ä. I
Gustaf af Ugglas	Gustaf af Ugglas (1820–1895)	23 August 1867	12 May 1870	2 years, 262 days	Independent	–	De Geer d.ä. I
Carl Fredrik Wærn	Carl Fredrik Wærn (1819–1899)	12 May 1870	28 September 1874	4 years, 139 days	Independent	–	Adlercreutz; Carleson
Gustaf Åkerhielm	Gustaf Åkerhielm (1833–1900)	28 September 1874	11 May 1875	225 days	Independent	–	Carleson
Hans Forssell	Hans Forssell (1843–1901)	11 May 1875	7 December 1880	5 years, 210 days	Independent	–	De Geer d.ä. II; Posse
Arvid Posse	Arvid Posse (1843–1901)	7 December 1880	8 March 1881	91 days	Lantmanna	–	Posse
Robert Themptander	Robert Themptander (1844–1897)	8 March 1881	28 May 1886	5 years, 81 days	Independent Liberal	–	Thyselius; Themptander
Claës Gustaf Adolf Tamm	Claës Gustaf Adolf Tamm (1838–1925)	28 May 1886	6 February 1888	1 year, 254 days	Independent	–	Themptander
Fredrik von Essen	Fredrik von Essen (1831–1921)	6 February 1888	6 November 1894	6 years, 273 days	Moderate	–	G. Bildt; Åkerhielm; Boström I
Erik Gustaf Boström	Erik Gustaf Boström (1842–1907)	6 November 1894	15 March 1895	129 days	Lantmanna	–	Boström I
Claës Wersäll	Claës Wersäll (1848–1919)	15 March 1895	16 July 1897	2 years, 123 days	Independent	–	Boström I
Hans Hansson Wachtmeister	Hans Hansson Wachtmeister (1851–1929)	16 July 1897	5 July 1902	4 years, 354 days	Moderate	–	von Otter
Ernst Meyer	Ernst Meyer (1847–1925)	5 July 1902	2 August 1905	3 years, 28 days	Liberals	–	Boström II; Ramstedt
Elof Biesèrt	Elof Biesèrt (1862–1928)	2 August 1905	29 May 1906	300 days	Liberals	M–L; L	Lundeberg; Staaff I
Carl Swartz	Carl Swartz (1858–1926)	29 May 1906	7 October 1911	5 years, 131 days	Electoral League	Electoral League	Lindman I
Theodor Adelswärd	Theodor Adelswärd (1860–1929)	7 October 1911	17 February 1914	2 years, 133 days	Liberals	L	Staaff II
Axel Vennersten	Axel Vennersten (1863–1948)	17 February 1914	30 March 1917	3 years, 41 days	Independent	–	Hammarskjöld
Conrad Carleson	Conrad Carleson (1868–1954)	30 March 1917	19 October 1917	203 days	National Party	National Party	Swartz
Hjalmar Branting	Hjalmar Branting (1860–1925)	19 October 1917	5 January 1918	78 days	Social Democrats	L–S	Edén
Fredrik Vilhelm Thorsson	Fredrik Vilhelm Thorsson (1865–1925)	5 January 1918	30 June 1920	2 years, 177 days	Social Democrats	L–S; S	Edén; Branting I
Rickard Sandler	Rickard Sandler (1884–1964)	30 June 1920	27 October 1920	119 days	Social Democrats	S	Branting I
Henric Tamm	Henric Tamm (1869–1936)	20 October 1920	23 February 1921	119 days	Independent	–	De Geer d.y.
Jacob Beskow	Jacob Beskow (1876–1928)	23 February 1921	13 October 1921	232 days	Independent	–	von Sydow
Fredrik Vilhelm Thorsson	Fredrik Vilhelm Thorsson (1865–1925)	13 October 1921	19 April 1923	1 year, 188 days	Social Democrats	S	Branting II
Jacob Beskow	Jacob Beskow (1876–1928)	19 April 1923	28 January 1924	284 days	National Party	National Party	Trygger
Fredrik Vilhelm Thorsson	Fredrik Vilhelm Thorsson (1865–1925)	28 January 1924	5 May 1925	1 year, 97 days	Social Democrats	S	Branting III; Sandler
Ernst Wigforss	Ernst Wigforss (1881–1977)	8 May 1925	7 June 1926	1 year, 30 days	Social Democrats	S	Sandler
Carl Gustaf Ekman	Carl Gustaf Ekman (1872–1945)	7 June 1926	30 September 1926	115 days	Liberals	L–L	Ekman I
Ernst Lyberg	Ernst Lyberg (1874–1952)	30 September 1926	2 October 1928	2 years, 2 days	Liberals	L–L	Ekman I
Nils Wohlin	Nils Wohlin (1881–1948)	2 October 1928	10 June 1929	251 days	Electoral League	Electoral League	Lindman II
Adolf Dahl	Adolf Dahl (1868–1930)	10 June 1929	7 June 1930	362 days	Electoral League	Electoral League	Lindman II
Felix Hamrin	Felix Hamrin (1875–1937)	7 June 1930	24 September 1932	2 years, 109 days	Liberals	L	Ekman II; Hamrin
Ernst Wigforss	Ernst Wigforss (1881–1977)	24 September 1932	19 June 1936	3 years, 269 days	Social Democrats	S	Hansson I
Vilmar Ljungdahl	Vilmar Ljungdahl (1892–1963)	19 June 1936	28 September 1936	101 days	Centre	C	Pehrsson-Bramstorp
Ernst Wigforss	Ernst Wigforss (1881–1977)	28 September 1936	30 June 1949	12 years, 275 days	Social Democrats	S–C (1936 – 1939); S–C–M–L (1939 – 1945); S (1945 – 1949)	Hansson II; Hansson III; Hansson IV; Erlander I
David Hall	David Hall (1898–1957)	30 June 1949	17 October 1949	109 days	Social Democrats	S	Erlander I
Per Edvin Sköld	Per Edvin Sköld (1891–1972)	17 October 1949	12 September 1955	5 years, 330 days	Social Democrats	S–C	Erlander II
Gunnar Sträng	Gunnar Sträng (1906–1992)	12 September 1955	8 October 1976	21 years, 26 days	Social Democrats	S–C; S	Erlander II; Erlander III; Palme I
Gösta Bohman	Gösta Bohman (1911–1997)	8 October 1976	26 November 1976	49 days	Moderate	C–M–L	Fälldin I
Position abolished between 1976 and 1983. It was split between the offices of minister of the budget and the minister of economics.
=== Minister for Finance 1983–present ===
Portrait	Minister for Finance (Born-Died)	Term			Political Party	Coalition	Cabinet
Portrait	Minister for Finance (Born-Died)	Took office	Left office	Duration	Political Party	Coalition	Cabinet
Kjell-Olof Feldt	Kjell-Olof Feldt (1931–2025)	1 January 1983	15 February 1990	7 years, 45 days	Social Democrats	S	Palme II; Carlsson I
Odd Engström	Odd Engström (1941–1998); Acting	15 February 1990	27 February 1990	12 days	Social Democrats	S	Carlsson I
Allan Larsson	Allan Larsson (born 1938)	27 February 1990	4 October 1991	1 year, 219 days	Social Democrats	S	Carlsson II
Anne Wibble	Anne Wibble (1943–2000)	4 October 1991	7 October 1994	3 years, 3 days	Liberals	M–C–L–KD	C. Bildt
Göran Persson	Göran Persson (born 1949)	7 October 1994	22 March 1996	1 year, 167 days	Social Democrats	S	Carlsson III
Erik Åsbrink	Erik Åsbrink (born 1947)	22 March 1996	12 April 1999	3 years, 21 days	Social Democrats	S	Persson
Bosse Ringholm	Bosse Ringholm (born 1942)	12 April 1999	31 October 2004	5 years, 202 days	Social Democrats	S	Persson
Pär Nuder	Pär Nuder (born 1963)	31 October 2004	6 October 2006	1 year, 340 days	Social Democrats	S	Persson
Anders Borg	Anders Borg (born 1968)	6 October 2006	3 October 2014	7 years, 362 days	Moderate	M–C–L–KD	Reinfeldt
Magdalena Andersson	Magdalena Andersson (born 1967)	3 October 2014	30 November 2021	7 years, 58 days	Social Democrats	S–MP	Löfven I- II- III
Mikael Damberg	Mikael Damberg (born 1971)	30 November 2021	18 October 2022	322 days	Social Democrats	S	Andersson
Elisabeth Svantesson	Elisabeth Svantesson (born 1967)	18 October 2022	Incumbent	3 years, 324 days	Moderate	M–KD–L	Kristersson

== See also ==
- Lord High Treasurer of Sweden (historical antecedent)
