= Minister for Foreign Trade (Sweden) =

Swedish cabinet position

Minister for Foreign Trade of Sweden
- Utrikeshandelsminister
- Lesser coat of arms of Sweden

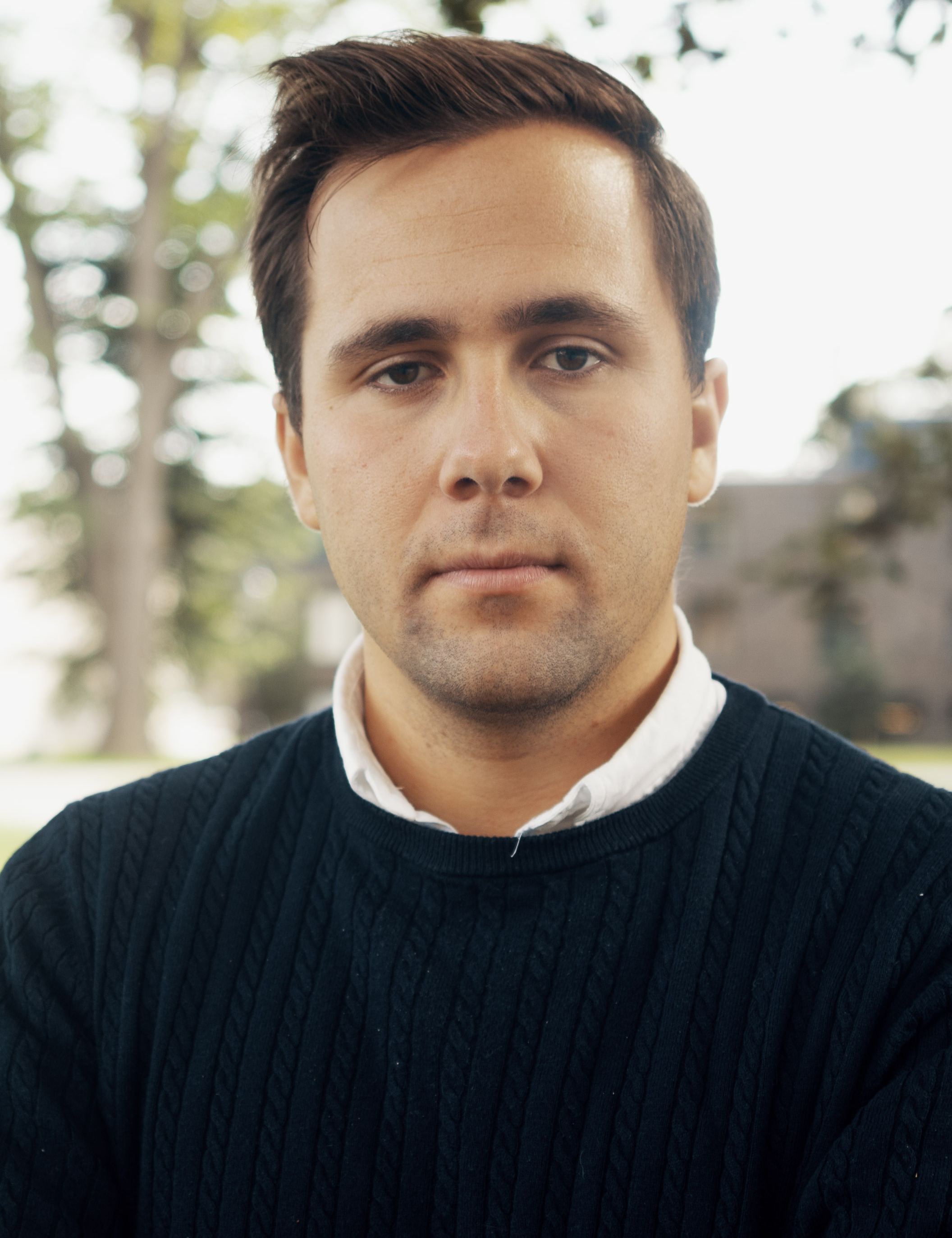
- Incumbent; Benjamin Dousa since 10 September 2024
- Ministry for Foreign Affairs
- Appointer: The Prime Minister
- Term length: No fixed term; Serves as long as the Prime Minister sees fit
- Formation: 1920
- First holder: Fredrik Vilhelm Thorsson

The Minister for Foreign Trade (Swedish: Utrikeshandelsminister), formally cabinet minister of the Ministry for Foreign Affairs, is a member and minister of the Government of Sweden and is appointed by the Prime Minister. The minister is responsible for policies related to trade and investment promotion.

The current minister for foreign trade is Benjamin Dousa of the Moderate Party. He concurrently serves as minister for international development cooperation.

== History ==
Between 1 July 1920 to 31 December 1982, there was a separate Ministry of Commerce and Industry which was headed by the minister of commerce and industry (Note: Handelsminister was translated during the 20th century into Minister of Commerce and Industry; (BrE) President of the Board of Trade; (AmE) Secretary of Commerce; (also) Minister for Economic Affairs. During the 1990s and 2000s, the title Minister for Trade was in use.) (handelsminister). Gunnar Lange (s) held the office for the longest time; 14 years and 32 days. The trade policy issues were dealt with between 1983 and 1996 by the minister of foreign trade (utrikeshandelsminister), who was a minister without portfolio at the Ministry for Foreign Affairs. From 1996 to 2002 the title was minister for trade (handelsminister), and from 2002 the issues were dealt with by the minister for industry, employment and communications. In 2006, trade issues were moved from the Ministry of Industry, Employment and Communications back to the Ministry for Foreign Affairs by the Reinfeldt Cabinet. In 2014, the post of minister for trade was abolished and trade matters were transferred to the Ministry of Enterprise and Innovation by the Löfven I Cabinet. In connection with the government reshuffle on 25 May 2016, the post was re-established and is sorted under the Ministry for Foreign Affairs. The post has been combined with other ministerial posts since 2016: minister for EU affairs (2016–2019), minister for nordic cooperation (2019–2022) and minister for international development cooperation (2022–present).

== List of officeholders ==
Color key

Independent
Historical parties: Lantmanna Moderate National Party Liberals Liberals Liberals Liberals
Present parties: Social Democrats Moderate Centre Left Liberals Christian Democrats Green Sweden Democrats

Status

Denotes acting Minister of Commerce and Industry

=== Ministers of Commerce and Industry (1920–1982) ===
Portrait	Minister (Born-Died)	Term			Political Party	Coalition	Cabinet
Portrait	Minister (Born-Died)	Took office	Left office	Duration	Political Party	Coalition	Cabinet
Fredrik Vilhelm Thorsson	Fredrik Vilhelm Thorsson (1865–1925)	1 July 1920	27 October 1920	118 days	Social Democrats	–	Branting I
Gösta Malm	Gösta Malm (1873–1965)	27 October 1920	13 October 1921	351 days	Independent	–	De Geer d.y. von Sydow
Carl Svensson	Carl Svensson (1879–1938)	13 October 1921	19 April 1923	1 year, 188 days	Social Democrats	–	Branting II
Nils Wohlin	Nils Wohlin (1881–1948)	19 April 1923	18 October 1924	1 year, 182 days	Independent	–	Trygger
Rickard Sandler	Rickard Sandler (1884–1964)	18 October 1924	27 February 1925	132 days	Social Democrats	–	Branting III; Sandler
Carl Svensson	Carl Svensson (1879–1938)	27 February 1925	7 June 1926	1 year, 130 days	Social Democrats	–	Sandler
Felix Hamrin	Felix Hamrin (1875–1937)	7 June 1926	2 October 1928	2 years, 122 days	Liberals	L–L	Ekman I
Vilhelm Lundvik	Vilhelm Lundvik (1883–1969)	2 October 1928	7 June 1930	1 year, 248 days	Electoral League	–	Lindman II
David Hansén	David Hansén (1880–1957)	7 June 1930	24 September 1932	2 years, 109 days	Liberals	–	Ekman II; Hamrin
Fritjof Ekman	Fritjof Ekman (1888–1952)	24 September 1932	19 June 1936	3 years, 269 days	Social Democrats	–	Hansson I
Elof Ericsson	Elof Ericsson (1887–1961)	19 June 1936	28 September 1936	101 days	Independent	–	Pehrsson-Bramstorp
Per Edvin Sköld	Per Edvin Sköld (1891–1972)	28 September 1936	16 December 1938	2 years, 79 days	Social Democrats	S–C	Hansson II
Gustav Möller	Gustav Möller (1884–1970)	16 December 1938	13 December 1939	362 days	Social Democrats	S–C	Hansson II
Fritiof Domö	Fritiof Domö (1889–1961)	13 December 1939	7 March 1941	1 year, 84 days	Moderate	S–C–L–M	Hansson III
Herman Eriksson	Herman Eriksson (1892–1949)	7 March 1941	30 September 1944	3 years, 207 days	Social Democrats	S–C–L–M	Hansson III
Bertil Ohlin	Bertil Ohlin (1899–1979)	30 September 1944	31 July 1945	304 days	Liberals	S–C–L–M	Hansson III
Gunnar Myrdal	Gunnar Myrdal (1898–1987)	31 July 1945	11 April 1947	2 years, 123 days	Social Democrats	–	Hansson IV; Erlander I
Axel Gjöres	Axel Gjöres (1889–1979)	24 May 1947	24 September 1948	1 year, 123 days	Social Democrats	–	Erlander I
John Ericsson	John Ericsson (1907–1977)	28 October 1948	12 September 1955	6 years, 319 days	Social Democrats	S–C	Erlander I Erlander II
Nils Gunnar Lange	Nils Gunnar Lange (1909–1976)	12 September 1955	14 October 1969	14 years, 32 days	Social Democrats	–	Erlander I Erlander II; Palme I
Kjell-Olof Feldt	Kjell-Olof Feldt (1931–2025)	9 October 1970	9 November 1975	5 years, 0 days	Social Democrats	–	Palme I
Carl Lidbom	Carl Lidbom (1926–2004)	10 November 1975	8 October 1976	333 days	Social Democrats	–	Palme I
Staffan Burenstam Linder	Staffan Burenstam Linder (1931–2000)	8 October 1976	18 October 1978	2 years, 10 days	Moderate	C–M–L	Fälldin I
Hadar Cars	Hadar Cars (born 1933)	18 October 1978	12 October 1979	359 days	Liberals	C–M–L	Ullsten
Staffan Burenstam Linder	Staffan Burenstam Linder (1931–2000)	12 October 1979	5 May 1981	1 year, 205 days	Moderate	C–M–L	Fälldin II
Jan-Erik Wikström	Jan-Erik Wikström (1932–2024); Acting	5 May 1981	22 May 1981	17 days	Liberals	C–M–L	Fälldin II
Björn Molin	Björn Molin (1932–2024)	22 May 1981	8 October 1982	1 year, 139 days	Liberals	C–M–L	Fälldin III
Lennart Bodström	Lennart Bodström (1928–2015)	8 October 1982	31 December 1982	84 days	Social Democrats	C–M–L	Palme II
=== Ministers of Foreign Trade (1983–1996) ===
Portrait	Minister (Born-Died)	Term			Political Party	Coalition	Cabinet
Portrait	Minister (Born-Died)	Took office	Left office	Duration	Political Party	Coalition	Cabinet
Mats Hellström	Mats Hellström (1942–2026)	11 January 1983	9 October 1986	3 years, 271 days	Social Democrats	–	Palme II; Carlsson I
Anita Gradin	Anita Gradin (1933–2022)	10 October 1986	4 October 1991	4 years, 359 days	Social Democrats	–	Carlsson I Carlsson II
Ulf Dinkelspiel	Ulf Dinkelspiel (1939–2017)	4 October 1991	7 October 1994	3 years, 3 days	Moderate	C–M–L–KD	Bildt
Mats Hellström	Mats Hellström (1942–2026)	7 October 1994	22 March 1996	1 year, 167 days	Social Democrats	–	Carlsson III
=== Ministers for Trade (1996–2002) ===
Portrait	Minister (Born-Died)	Term			Political Party	Coalition	Cabinet
Portrait	Minister (Born-Died)	Took office	Left office	Duration	Political Party	Coalition	Cabinet
Björn von Sydow	Björn von Sydow (born 1945)	22 March 1996	31 January 1997	315 days	Social Democrats	–	Persson
Leif Pagrotsky	Leif Pagrotsky (born 1951)	1 February 1997	2002	5 years, 261 days	Social Democrats	–	Persson
=== Ministers for Industry, Employment and Communications (2002–2006) ===
Portrait	Minister (Born-Died)	Term			Political Party	Coalition	Cabinet
Portrait	Minister (Born-Died)	Took office	Left office	Duration	Political Party	Coalition	Cabinet
Leif Pagrotsky	Leif Pagrotsky (born 1951)	21 October 2002	21 October 2004	2 years, 0 days	Social Democrats	–	Persson
Thomas Östros	Thomas Östros (born 1965)	1 November 2004	6 October 2006	1 year, 339 days	Social Democrats	–	Persson
=== Ministers for Foreign Trade (2006–2014) ===
Portrait	Minister (Born-Died)	Term			Political Party	Coalition	Cabinet
Portrait	Minister (Born-Died)	Took office	Left office	Duration	Political Party	Coalition	Cabinet
Maria Borelius	Maria Borelius (born 1960)	6 October 2006	14 October 2006	8 days	Moderate	Alliance	Reinfeldt
Sten Tolgfors	Sten Tolgfors (born 1966)	24 October 2006	12 September 2007	323 days	Moderate	Alliance	Reinfeldt
Ewa Björling	Ewa Björling (born 1961)	12 September 2007	3 October 2014	7 years, 21 days	Moderate	Alliance	Reinfeldt
=== Ministers for Enterprise and Innovation (2014–2016) ===
Portrait	Minister (Born-Died)	Term			Political Party	Coalition	Cabinet
Portrait	Minister (Born-Died)	Took office	Left office	Duration	Political Party	Coalition	Cabinet
Mikael Damberg	Mikael Damberg (born 1971)	3 October 2014	25 May 2016	1 year, 235 days	Social Democrats	S–MP	Löfven I
=== Ministers for Foreign Trade (2016–) ===
Portrait	Minister (Born-Died)	Term			Political Party	Coalition	Cabinet
Portrait	Minister (Born-Died)	Took office	Left office	Duration	Political Party	Coalition	Cabinet
Ann Linde	Ann Linde (born 1961)	25 May 2016	10 September 2019	3 years, 108 days	Social Democrats	S–MP	Löfven I Löfven II
Anna Hallberg	Anna Hallberg (born 1963)	10 September 2019	18 October 2022	3 years, 38 days	Social Democrats	S–MP	Löfven II; Löfven III; Andersson
Johan Forssell	Johan Forssell (born 1979)	18 October 2022	10 September 2024	1 year, 328 days	Moderate	M–KD–L	Kristersson
Benjamin Dousa	Benjamin Dousa (born 1992)	10 September 2024	Incumbent	2 years, 7 days	Moderate	M–KD–L	Kristersson
