= Felix Hamrin =

Swedish politician (1875–1937)

His Excellency Felix Hamrin
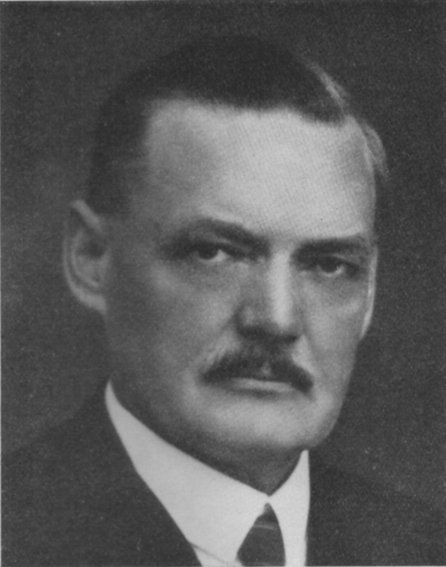

Prime Minister of Sweden
- In office 6 August 1932 – 24 September 1932
- Monarch: Gustaf V
- Preceded by: Carl Gustaf Ekman
- Succeeded by: Per Albin Hansson

Minister of Finance
- In office 7 June 1930 – 24 September 1932
- Prime Minister: Carl Gustaf Ekman; Himself
- Preceded by: Adolf Dahl
- Succeeded by: Ernst Wigforss

Minister of Commerce and Industry
- In office 7 June 1926 – 2 October 1928
- Prime Minister: Carl Gustaf Ekman
- Preceded by: Carl Svensson
- Succeeded by: Vilhelm Lundvik

Personal details
- Born: Felix Teodor Hamrin; 14 January 1875 Mönsterås, Sweden
- Died: 27 November 1937 (aged 62) Jönköping, Sweden
- Party: Freeminded People's (1911–1934)
- Other political affiliations: People's Party (1934–1937)
- Spouse: Elizabeth Pennycock (m. 1900)
- Children: 7
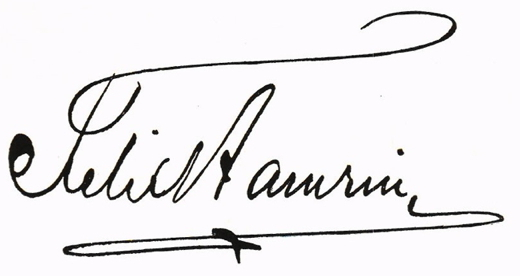
- Signature

Felix Teodor Hamrin (14 January 1875 – 27 November 1937) was a Swedish businessman and liberal politician who briefly served as Prime Minister of Sweden from August to September 1932. From 1932 to 1935, he led the Free-Minded People's Party. His short tenure of 49 days in office is shortest in Swedish history.

== Early life and career ==
Hamrin was born in Mönsterås, Kalmar County, to Carl Gustaf Petersson, a tanner and leather dealer, and Maria Petersson (née Cedergren). Hamrin had an older brother, Josef Hamrin, who was chief executive officer of Jönköpings-Posten.

Hamrin studied in Eksjö. Despite good academic results, he was forced to interrupt his studies in 1889 due to his family's financial problems. Hamrim served as a ship's boy in Karlskrona for six months and worked as a gofer and salesclerk in Västergötland and Stockholm. After studying at a business school in Gothenburg, he moved to Jönköping in 1890. Harmin worked at several grocers in Jönköping and Gothenburg. In 1903, he founded the wholesale company AB Felix Hamrin & Co. in Jönköping, which he ran until he became Minister of Finance in 1930.

== Political career ==
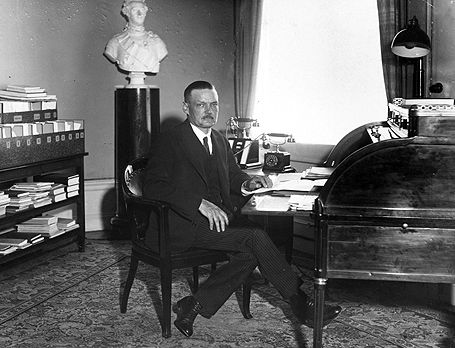
Prime Minister Hamrin in 1932.

Hamrin entered into politics in 1906 as his business began to show stable financial results. He got elected as city councillor in 1906 as a member of the Free-minded National Association.

After being elected into the second chamber of the Riksdag at the young age of 37, he advocated for entrepreneurship, freedom of religion and the temperance movement. During the Courtyard Crisis and fall of prime minister Karl Staaff, he formed a friendship with Carl Gustaf Ekman. Despite retaining his seat in the September 1914 elections, Hamrin would resign from his position to focus on his business. Hamrin would reenter the Riksdag in the 1917 election. Tension was rising between the social democrats and liberals in Nils Edén's coalition government after the implementation of women's suffrage. Hamrin, along with Ekman and Gustav Rosén, belonged to those in the Liberal Coalition Party who most clearly opposed cooperation with the Social Democrats. The coalition government collapsed in 1920 over the issue of local taxation. After women's suffrage was passed, the issue of prohibition of liquor became the main political focus. The issue divided the liberals in the Riksdag. Hamrin would remain in the Free-minded People's Party when the anti-prohibition minority formed the Liberal Party of Sweden.

Under Carl Gustaf Ekman's first premiership he served as Minister of Commerce and Industry from 1926 to 1928 and as Minister of Finance from 1930 to 1932. When Ekman was forced to resign shortly before the elections in 1932 due to the Kreuger crash, Hamrin became prime minister. He resigned after the election because the Free-minded People's Party had suffered serious losses in the election.

He served briefly as party leader for the Free-minded People's Party after Ekman, and in the newly formed People's Party until a new party leader was chosen in January 1935. He also served as the governor of Jönköping County from 1930 to 1937. His most important political tasks were to fight the economic effects of the early years of the Depression in Sweden through severe economy measures, and to mitigate the effects of the Kreuger crash.

== Personal life ==
He married Elizabeth "Lizzie" Pennycock in 1900. They had seven children.

He died in Jönköping on 27 November 1937.

Political offices
Preceded by Adolf Dahl	Minister for Finance; 1930–1932	Succeeded by Ernst Wigforss
Preceded by Carl Gustaf Ekman	Prime Minister of Sweden; August–September 1932	Succeeded by Per Albin Hansson
