= Branting I cabinet =

Sweden's government

- Cabinet of Sweden

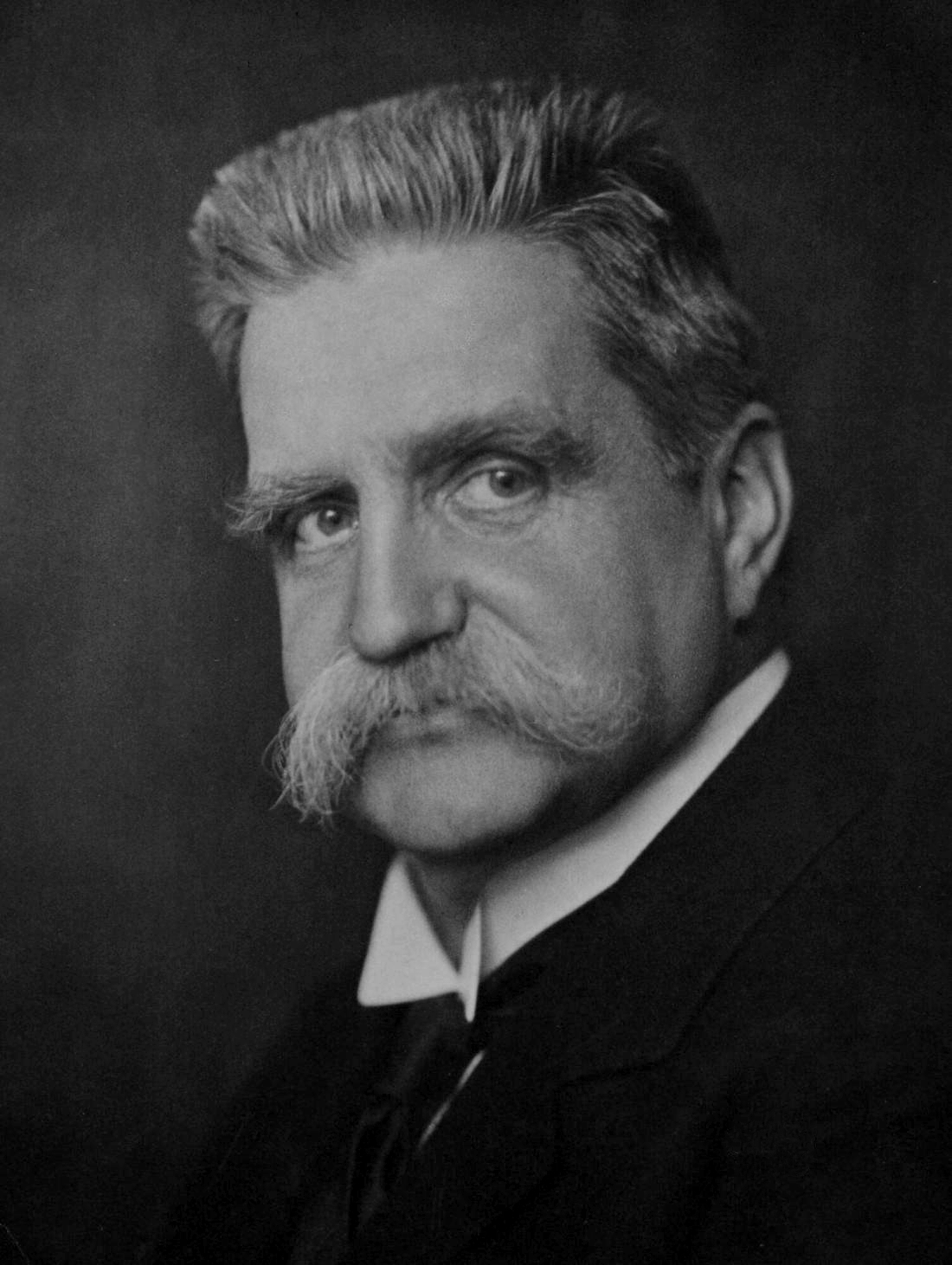
- Prime Minister Hjalmar Branting
- Date formed: 10 March 1920
- Date dissolved: 27 October 1920

People and organisations
- Head of state: Gustav V
- Head of government: Hjalmar Branting
- Member party: Social Democrats
- Status in legislature: Single-party minority (upper & lower house)
- Opposition parties: Liberal Coalition Party; General Electoral League; Swedish Social Democratic Left Party; Farmers' League; National Agrarian Union

History
- Outgoing formation: 1920 election
- Election: 1920 election
- Predecessor: Edén cabinet
- Successor: De Geer Jr cabinet

The Branting I cabinet (Swedish: regeringen Branting I) was the government of Sweden from 10 March 1920 to 27 October 1920. It was a Social Democratic single-party minority government led by Prime Minister Hjalmar Branting. He was the first Social Democratic Prime Minister of Sweden.

After that the Riksdag (Swedish parliament) did not pass the government's proposition concerning the reformation of the taxation system, they ordered two investigations, about industrial democracy and the socialisation of private companies (Socialiseringsnämnden).

In the 1920 general election, the Social Democrats lost 11 seats in the Riksdag. In the Riksdag, the Liberal Coalition Party were the weight between the Social Democrats and the conservative General Electoral League. In run-up to the 1921 general election, no party wanted to take over as government, so King Gustav V added a public administration, the De Geer Jr cabinet, with Louis De Geer Jr as prime minister.

== Ministers ==
Portfolio	Minister	Took office	Left office	Party
Prime Minister's Office
Prime Minister, Head of the Prime Minister's Office	Hjalmar Branting	10 March 1920	27 October 1920	Social Democrats
Ministry for Foreign Affairs
Minister for Foreign Affairs, Head of the Ministry for Foreign Affairs	Erik Palmstierna	10 March 1920	27 October 1920	Social Democrats
Ministry of Justice
Minister for Justice, Head of the Ministry of Justice	Östen Undén	10 March 1920	30 June 1920	Social Democrats
Minister for Justice, Head of the Ministry of Justice	Assar Åkerman	30 June 1920	27 October 1920	Social Democrats
Ministry of Defence
Minister for Defence, Head of the Ministry of Defence	Per Albin Hansson (Note: Served as Minister for War between 10 March 1920 and 30 June 1920.)	10 March 1920	27 October 1920	Social Democrats
Sea Minister	Bernhard Eriksson	10 March 1920	30 June 1920	Social Democrats
Ministry for Civil Service Affairs
Minister for Civil Service Affairs, Head of the Ministry of Civilian Affairs	Carl Svensson	10 March 1920	30 June 1920	Social Democrats
Ministry of Health and Social Affairs
Minister for Health and Social Affairs, Head of the Ministry of Health and Social Affairs	Bernhard Eriksson	1 July 1920	27 October 1920	Social Democrats
Ministry of Finance
Minister for Finance	Fredrik Vilhelm Thorsson	10 March 1920	30 June 1920	Social Democrats
Minister for Finance	Rickard Sandler	1 July 1920	27 October 1920	Social Democrats
Ministry of Education and Ecclesiastical Affairs
Minister of Education and Ecclesiastical Affairs	Olof Olsson	30 June 1920	27 October 1920	Social Democrats
Ministry of Agriculture
Minister of Agriculture	Olof Nilsson	30 June 1920	27 October 1920	Social Democrats
Ministry of Commerce and Industry
Minister of Commerce and Industry	Fredrik Vilhelm Thorsson	1 July 1920	27 October 1920	Social Democrats
Other Ministers
Konsultativt statsråd	Rickard Sandler	10 March 1920	30 June 1920	Social Democrats
Konsultativt statsråd	William Linder	1 July 1920	27 October 1920	Social Democrats
Konsultativt statsråd	Torsten Nothin	30 June 1920	27 October 1920	Social Democrats

== Notes ==
Preceded by Edén cabinet	Cabinet of Sweden; 1920	Succeeded by De Geer Jr cabinet
