= Hadar Cars =

Swedish politician (born 1933)

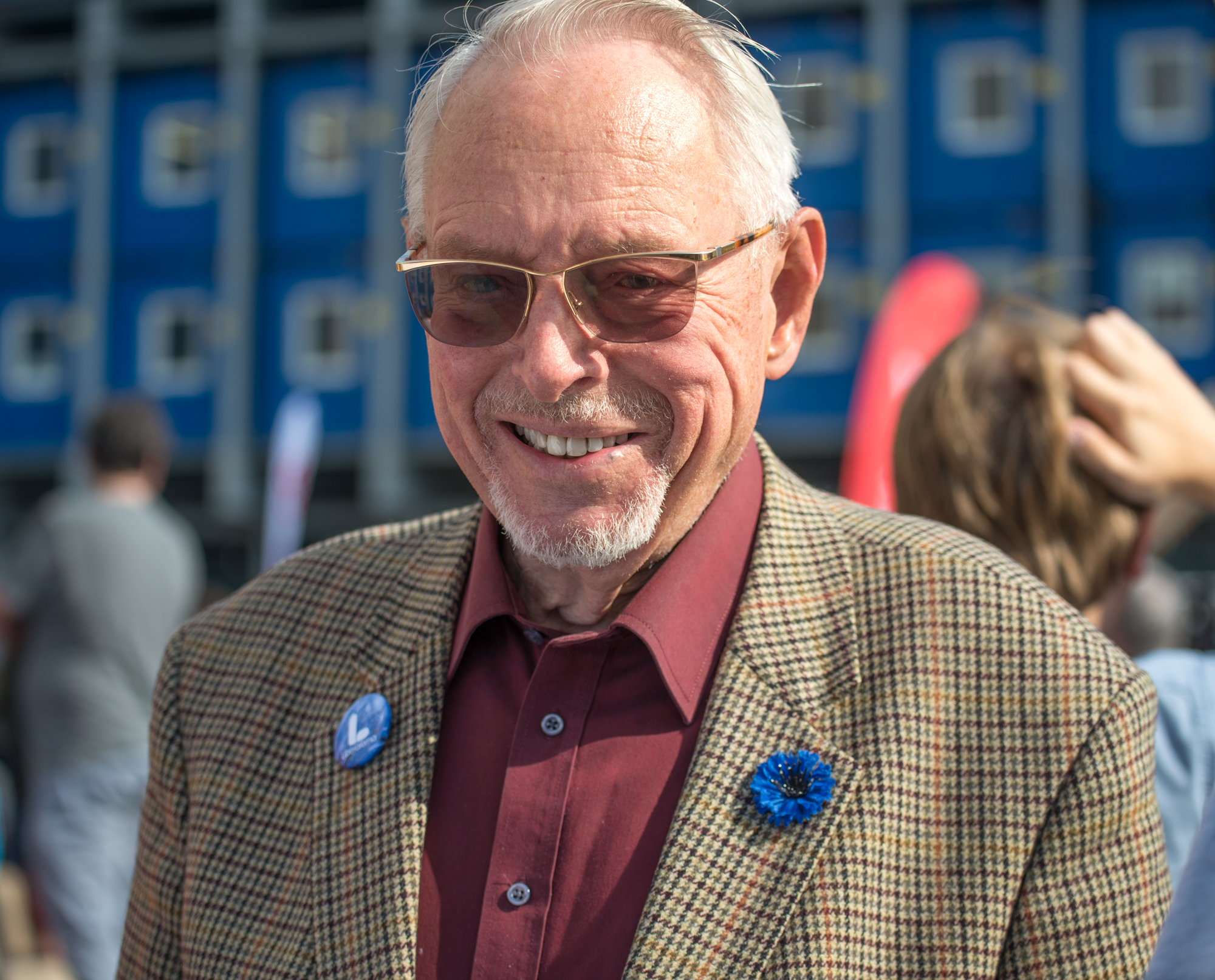
- Hadar Cars in 2018

Minister of Commerce and Industry
- In office 18 October 1978 – 12 October 1979
- Prime Minister: Ola Ullsten
- Preceded by: Staffan Burenstam Linder
- Succeeded by: Staffan Burenstam Linder

Personal details
- Born: 13 June 1933 (age 92) Stockholm, Sweden
- Party: Liberals

Hadar Cars (born 13 June 1933) is a Swedish liberal politician who served as the minister of commerce and industry between 1978 and 1979. He also served in the Swedish Parliament and European Parliament.

== Biography ==
Cars was born in Stockholm on 13 June 1933. He headed the Nordic Liberal Student Council. Cars is a member of the Liberals. He was appointed minister of commerce and industry in October 1978 to the cabinet led by Prime Minister Ola Ullsten. Cars replaced Staffan Burenstam Linder in the post. Cars's tenure ended in October 1979, and he was succeeded by Staffan Burenstam Linder as the minister of commerce and industry.

Cars served at the Parliament between 1985 and 1995. During his term at the Parliament he was the chairman of the international committee of the Liberals. Cars was elected to the European Parliament in 1995 and served there as part of the European Liberal, Democrat and Reform Party until 1999.

== Works and awards ==
Cars is the author of various articles and books which are concerned with the energy, finance policy and the European Union. He received the ribbon of the Order of the Seraphim in 1999.
