= Fredrik Vilhelm Thorsson =

Swedish politician (1865–1925)

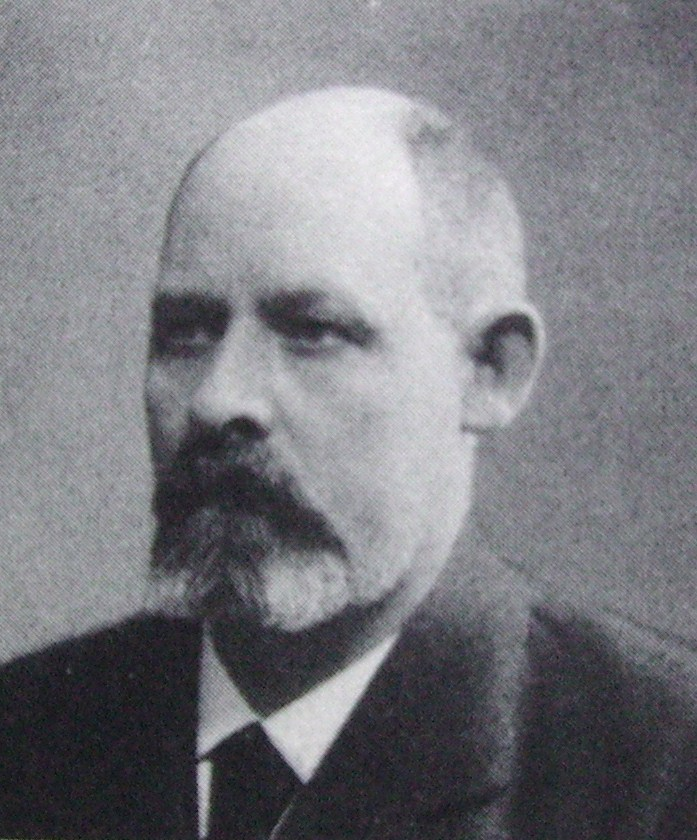

Minister for Finance
- In office 5 January 1918 – 30 June 1920
- Prime Minister: Nils Edén; Hjalmar Branting
- Preceded by: Hjalmar Branting
- Succeeded by: Rickard Sandler
- In office 13 October 1921 – 19 April 1923
- Prime Minister: Hjalmar Branting
- Preceded by: Jacob Beskow
- Succeeded by: Jacob Beskow
- In office 18 October 1924 – 5 May 1925
- Prime Minister: Hjalmar Branting; Rickard Sandler
- Preceded by: Jacob Beskow
- Succeeded by: Ernst Wigforss

1st Minister of Commerce and Industry
- In office 1 July 1920 – 27 October 1920
- Prime Minister: Hjalmar Branting
- Preceded by: Post created
- Succeeded by: Gösta Malm

Personal details
- Born: 30 May 1865 Ystad, Sweden
- Died: 5 May 1925 (aged 59) Ystad, Sweden
- Party: Social Democrats

Fredrik Vilhelm Thorsson (30 May 1865 – 5 May 1925) was a Swedish politician and shoemaker. He was Minister for Finance during three separate periods (1918–1920, 1921–1923, and 1924–1925), and Minister of Commerce and Industry in 1920.

== Biography ==
Fredrik Vilhelm Thorsson came from humble working conditions. He was the son of shoemaker Nils Thorsson Viktor and Amalia Charlotta Pihlström. At the age of nine, he became an orphan, and was looked after by the parish officers and sold at child auction, where they offered children at sale. That he would follow in his father's footsteps and be trained to cobbler was obvious; his journeyman he undertook, inter alia, in Copenhagen when he received a journeyman's certificate in Ystad. As a shoemaker, he worked in Stockholm, Uppsala and Sundsvall. In doing so, he began to agitate for improved conditions for the workers. Then he became known as a prominent figure of the Scanian Socialists, he boycotted by several employers and returned to his home town, Ystad, where he opened a shoemaker with his partner Anders Nordstrand.

=== Political career ===
In 1889, Thorsson was employed by the Social Democratic Party in southern Sweden as an agitator, and proved to be quite talented. In 1897 he campaigned against C. G. Ekman, which resulted in several trade unions affiliating themselves with the social democratic movement.

Thorsson was elected to the Lower House of the then bicameral Parliament of Sweden in 1902, and was regarded as the most radical of the Social Democrats. In the parliament he won a debate against the State Committee, a powerful group in the bicameral parliament, regarding the sale of state property. In 1909 he became a member of the State Committee, then headed by Karl Staaf, with special responsibility for the military defence, and was also appointed Deputy Chairman of the Parliamentary Trustees. In contrast to other left-wing politicians in the parliamentary group, he was positive to the military defence. He was a member of the State Committee until 1917. In 1914 he became a member of the governing board of the Swedish National Bank and re-elected in 1917. In 1918, he became Minister for Finance in Nils Edén's cabinet, a coalition between Liberals and Social Democrats, when Hjalmar Branting had resigned as Minister for Finance. He then implemented a budget reform and drafted proposals for council tax reforms.

In March 1920, the coalition government was dissolved when Thorsson could not agree with the Liberals in the government on municipal taxes. In Branting's first cabinet, he became the first Minister of Commerce and Industry, heading the newly created Ministry of Commerce and Industry for a few months in 1920. He was then appointed Minister for Finance in Branting's second cabinet in 1921. The cabinet dissolved itself in April 1923, when the Upper House would not accept a proposal regarding unemployment support.

Thorsson again became Minister for Finance in Branting's third cabinet in October 1924. When Branting died in February 1925, Thorsson was, according to some sources elected chairman of the Social Democratic party, but he was not officially recognised as such before falling ill and dying in May of that year. Ernst Wigforss in his memoirs states that Thorsson firmly believed that Rickard Sandler, who had served as prime minister since Branting fell ill in January, was the most suitable candidate for party chairman. Thorsson was succeeded as finance minister by Ernst Wigforss, and Per Albin Hansson became party chairman.

== Legacy ==
Fredrik Ström wrote an account of Thorsson in the small volume Skomakaren, som blev kungens skattmästare, which was printed the year after Ström's death.

In Ystad, a bust of Thorsson was later set up in the city.

Political offices
Preceded by Hjalmar Branting	Minister for Finance; 1918–1920	Succeeded by Rickard Sandler
Preceded by Office established	Minister of Commerce and Industry; 1920	Succeeded by Gösta Malm
Preceded by Jacob Beskow	Minister for Finance; 1921–1923	Succeeded by Jacob Beskow
Preceded by Jacob Beskow	Minister for Finance; 1924–1925	Succeeded by Ernst Wigforss
