= Ernst Wigforss =

Swedish politician and linguist

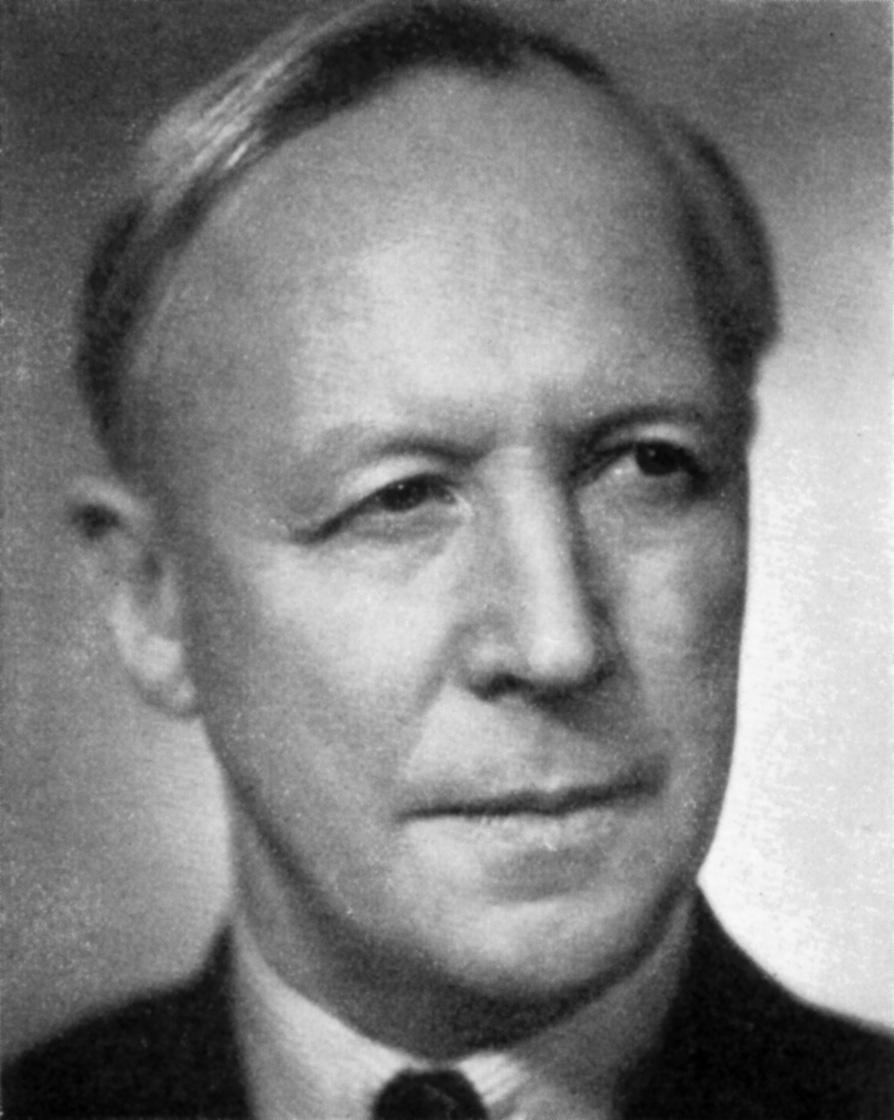

Minister of Finance
- In office 28 September 1936 – 30 June 1949
- Prime Minister: Per Albin Hansson; Tage Erlander
- Preceded by: Vilmar Ljungdahl
- Succeeded by: David Hall
- In office 24 September 1932 – 19 June 1936
- Prime Minister: Per Albin Hansson
- Preceded by: Felix Hamrin
- Succeeded by: Vilmar Ljungdahl
- In office 8 May 1925 – 7 June 1926
- Prime Minister: Rickard Sandler
- Preceded by: Fredrik Vilhelm Thorsson
- Succeeded by: Carl Gustaf Ekman

Personal details
- Born: Ernst Johannes Wigforss; 24 January 1881 Halmstad, Sweden
- Died: 2 January 1977 (aged 95) Båstad, Sweden
- Party: Social Democratic
- Occupation: Docent

Ernst Johannes Wigforss (24 January 1881–2 January 1977) was a Swedish politician and linguist (dialectologist), mostly known as a prominent member of the Social Democratic Workers' Party and Swedish Minister of Finance. Wigforss became one of the main theoreticians in the development of the Swedish Social Democratic movement's revision of Marxism, from a revolutionary to a reformist organization. He was inspired and stood ideologically close to the ideas of the Fabian Society and guild socialism and inspired by people like R. H. Tawney, L.T. Hobhouse and J. A. Hobson. He made contributions in his early writings about industrial democracy and workers' self-management.

== Early life and education ==
Born in the town of Halmstad in Halland in southwestern Sweden, Wigforss studied at Lund University from 1899, and published writings on political issues in this period. He completed a doctorate in 1913 with a dissertation on the dialect of south Halland, becoming docent in Scandinavian languages at the university the same year. He taught at the gymnasium in Lund (Lunds högre allmänna läroverk) 1911-1914 and as lecturer of German and Swedish at the Latin gymnasium in Gothenburg from 1914.

== Political career ==
In 1919 Wigforss was elected as a Social Democratic member of the First Chamber of the Swedish Parliament, representing Gothenburg, and he became a member of various committees. He was appointed a member of the third cabinet of Hjalmar Branting in 1924, and after Branting's resignation in January 1925, became a member of Rickard Sandler's cabinet. He was made temporary Minister of Finance on 24 January 1925 when Fredrik Thorsson fell ill, and succeeded him on 8 May of the same year, following his death. The Sandler cabinet resigned on 7 June 1926.

He was again Minister of Finance in the cabinets of Per Albin Hansson and Tage Erlander from 1932 to 1949.

Wigforss became Gunnar Myrdal's main political opponent with respect to the currency crisis of 1947. Swedish historians tend to interpret this crisis as Myrdal's political failure, while the historian Orjan Appelqvist argue that it is Wigforss and Axel Gjöres who hold primary responsibility for this political fiasco.

Academics including Adam Przeworski and Stephanie Mudge have noted the clear similarity of Wigforss' economic policies and visions to those of his contemporary John Maynard Keynes. Wigforss may either have been influenced by Keynes or anticipated him, to the effect that his politics have been described as "Keynesianism before Keynes". For example, he already proposed counter-cyclical economic policy before becoming Minister of Finance in 1932. But it is perhaps most accurate to claim that his main economic influences came from Knut Wicksell. He inspired younger economists like Gunnar Myrdal and the Stockholm school, who worked in the same direction as Keynes at the same time. John Kenneth Galbraith writes that it "would be more fair to say 'The Swedish Economic Revolution' than the 'Keynesian revolution' in economics, and that Wigforss was first in this transformation of thinking and practice about economy".

In his pamphlet Har vi råd att arbeta? (Can we afford to work?), widely believed to have won the 1932 elections for the Social Democrats, he made fun of the Liberal theory that budget cuts are the proper remedy for economic downturns. Although he is considered the creator of the Swedish social democratic economy, controversies with Minister for Social Affairs Gustav Möller (who would have preferred graduated taxation to have been higher) prevented both from being elected party chairman and Prime Minister at the death of Hansson.

== Later life ==
After his resignation, Wigforss continued until his death to write and speak on political issues and was considered one of the most innovative and daring Social Democratic politicians. He supported the anti-nuclear movement of the 1950s and contributed to the discontinuation of the Swedish nuclear arms programme in 1962.

== In popular culture ==
In the Swedish television movie, Four Days that shook Sweden - The Midsummer Crisis 1941, from 1988, he is played by Swedish actor Helge Skoog.
