= Hjalmar Brantings Plads =

Square in Copenhagen, Denmark

Coordinates: 55°41′32″N 12°34′54″E

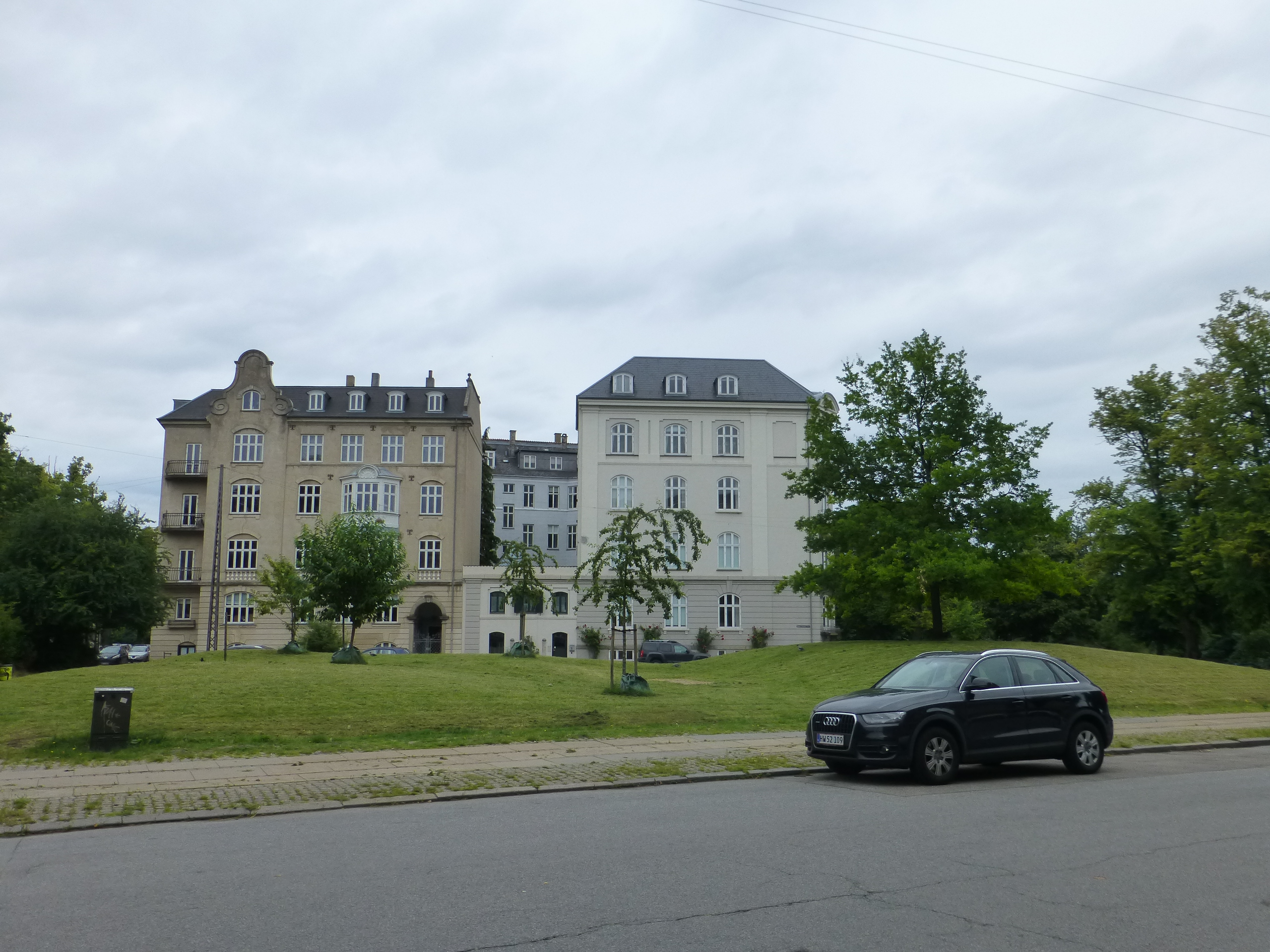
Hjalmar Brantings Plads

Hjalmar Brantings Plads is a square between Stockholmsgade and Oluf Palmes Gade in central Copenhagen, Denmark. It is named for the Nobel Peace Prize-winning former Swedish prime minister Hjalmar Branting.

== History ==
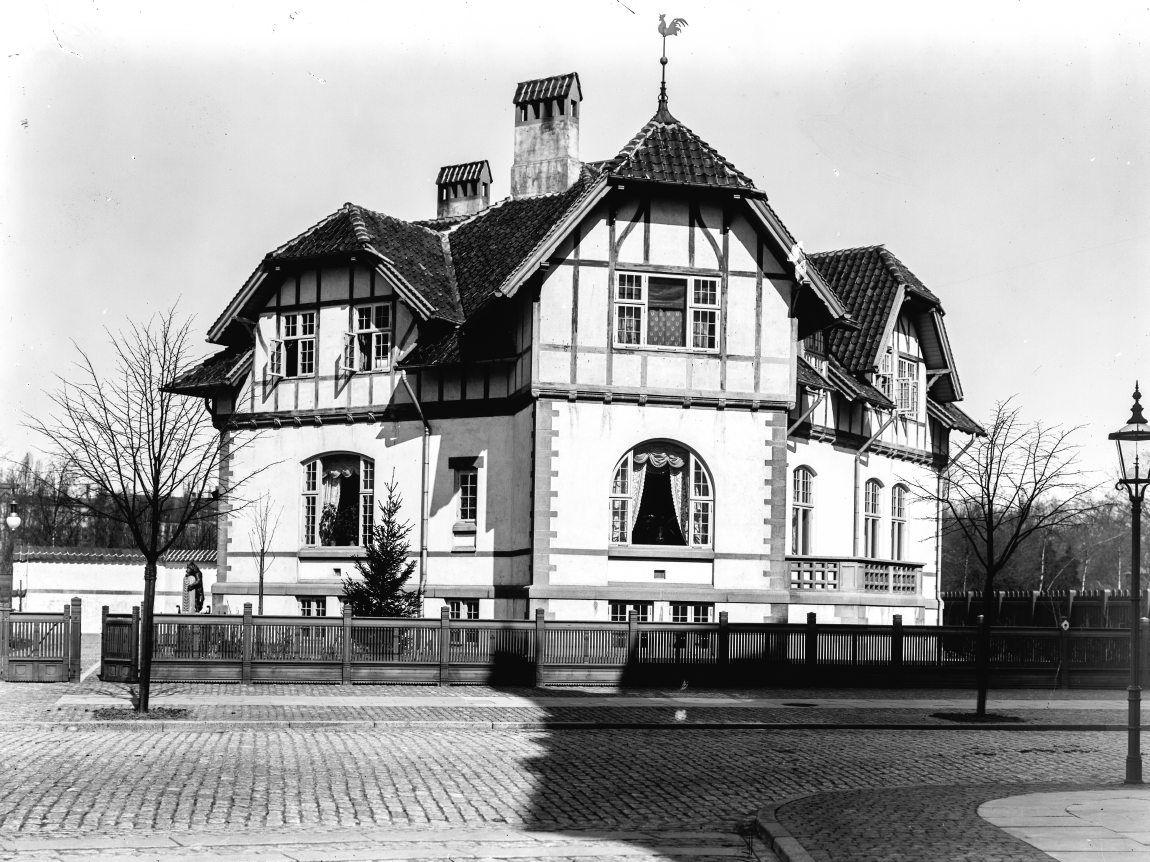
Villa at Stockholms Plads 6

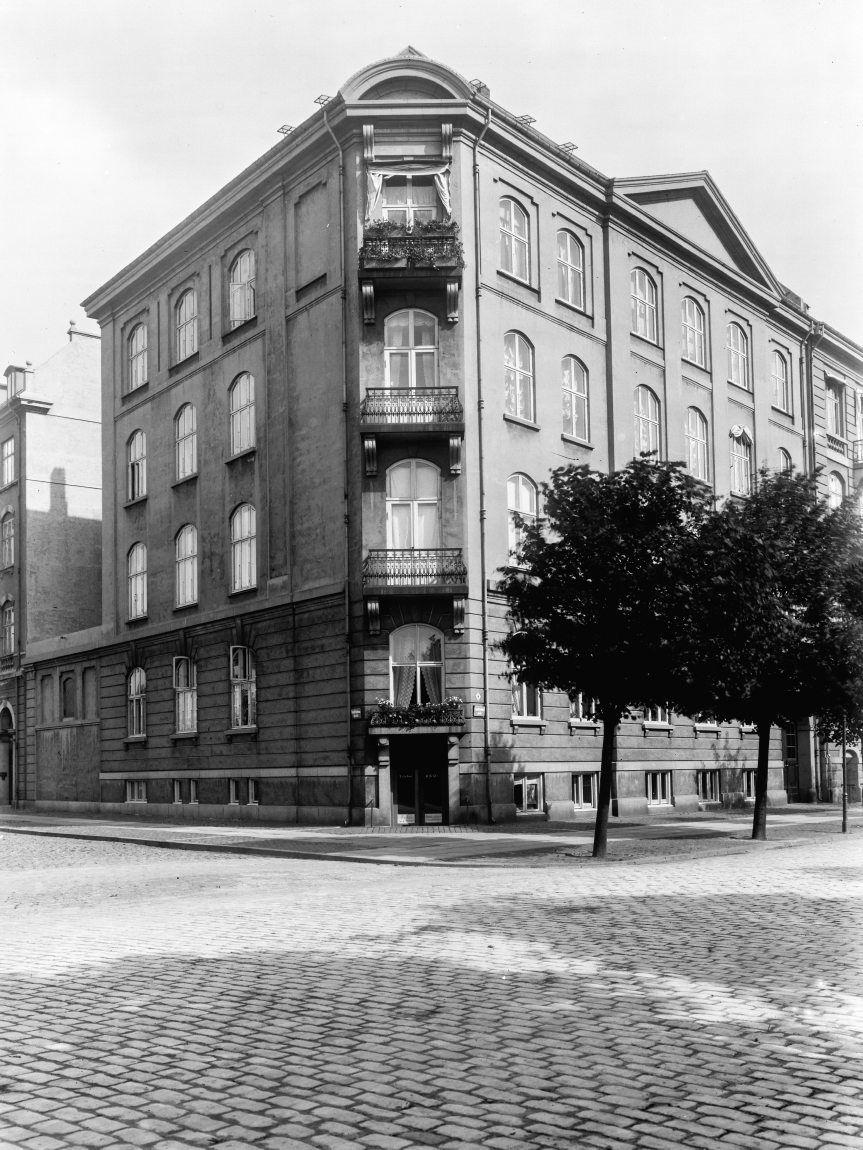
The corner of Stockholmsgade and Stockholms Plads photographed by Frederik Riise

The square is situated at the former site of a reduit outside Copenhagen's East Rampart. A plan for redevelopment of the area was created when the city's bastioned fortifications were decommissioned in the 1850s. The site was initially intended for a new church but the Isaiah Church was ultimately built a little further to the west. The old site was instead laid out as a public space with the name Stockholms Plads. It was renamed Hjalmar Brantings Plads in 1925.

== Design ==
The shape of the square has been determined by the shape of the bastion that was formerly located at the site and remains of it has been reused in the design of its central garden complex.

== Buildings ==
The building is to the northeast and southwest flanked by high-end apartment buildings. They were both built in 1894-97 to design by Andreas Clemmensen. Grant Thornton is based at No. 1.

The square is to the northwest separated from the Cemetery of Holmen by a row of large villas. No. 6 is built in the National Romantic style with exposed timber framing on the upper floor. The company Peter Jahn & Partnere is now based in the building. No. 8 was built for the industrialist M. A. Heegaard in 1899-1901 to design by Ulrik Plesner. Dansk Told- og Skatteforbund, a labour union for civil servants in the tax and customs administration, is headquartered in the building.

== Public art ==
A bronze statue of a bear by Lauritz Jensen is located on the square.
