= 1924 Swedish general election =

- 19–21 September 1924

All 230 seats in the Riksdag
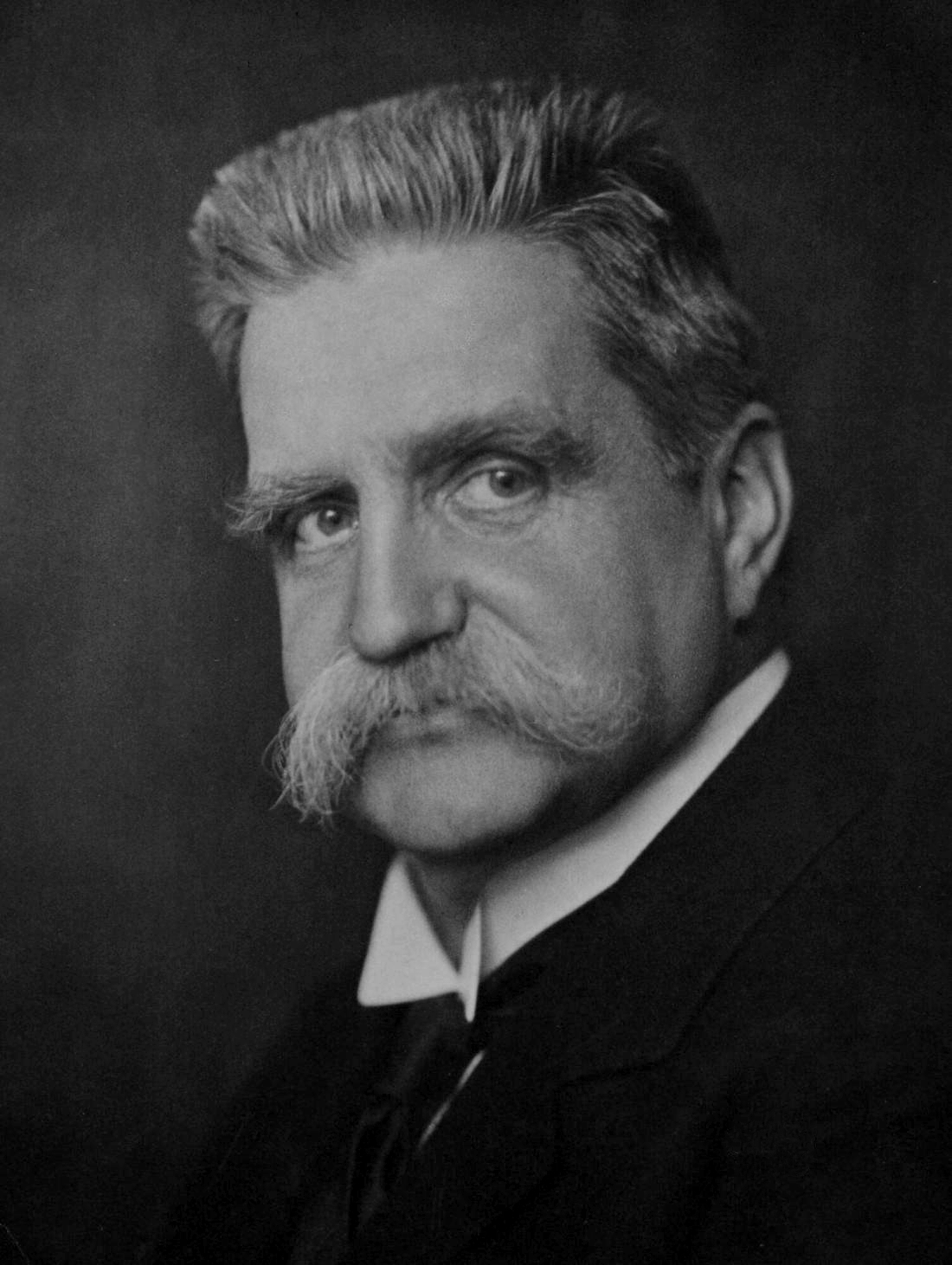

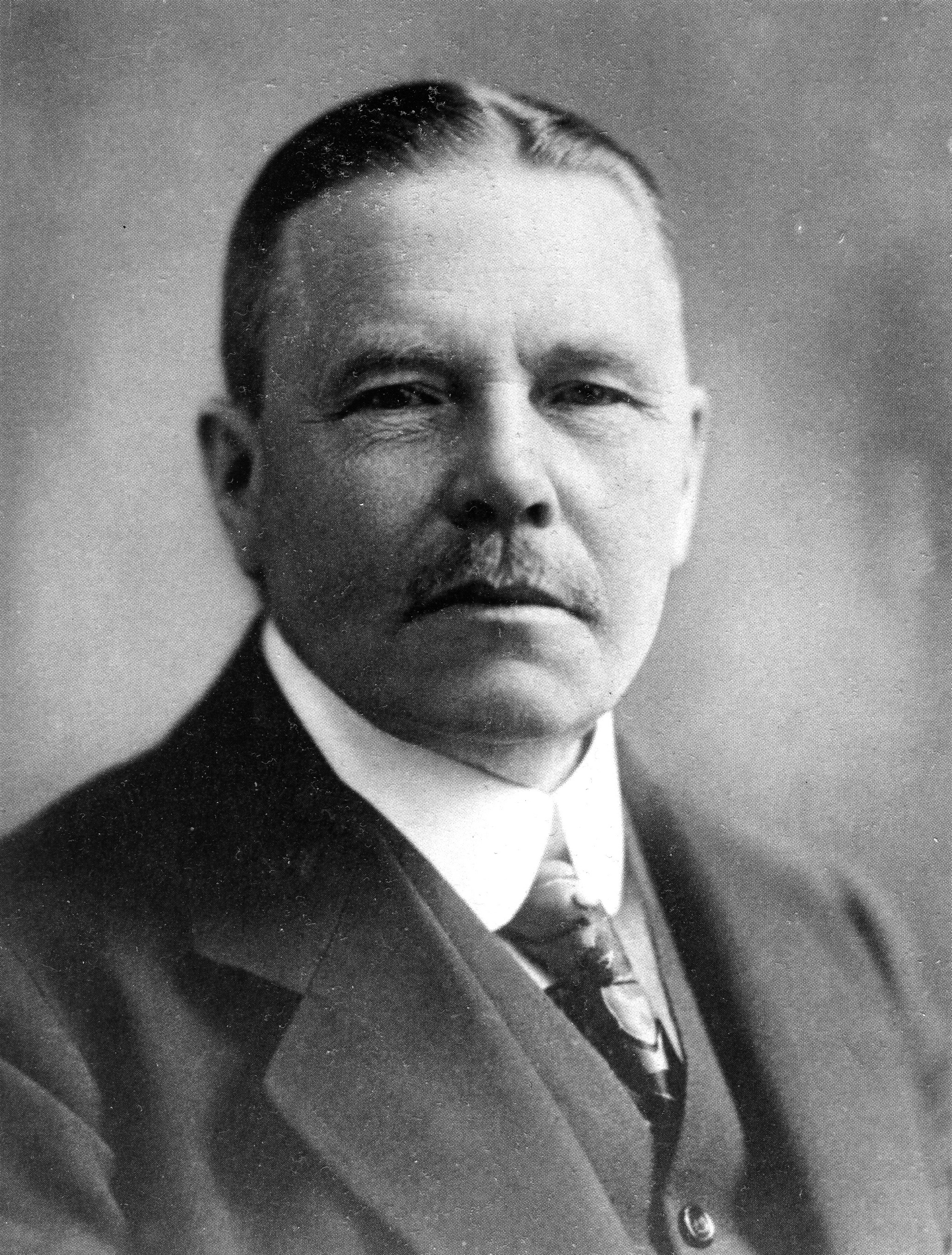

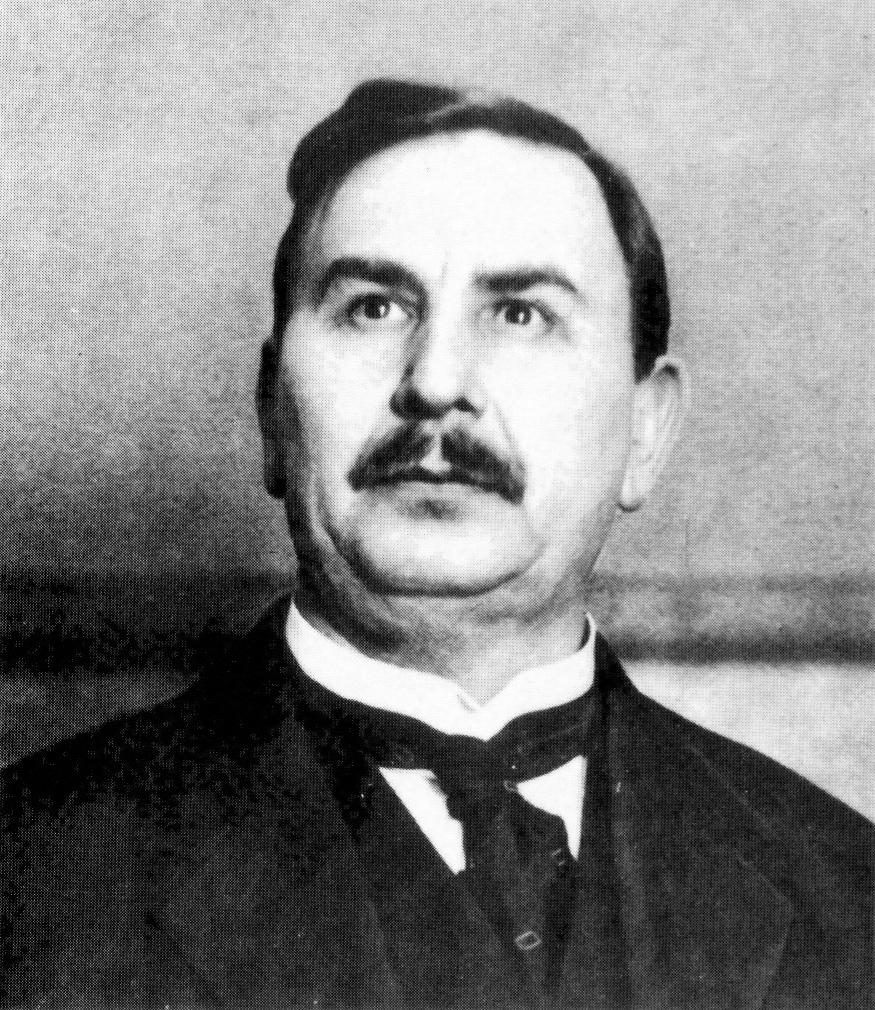

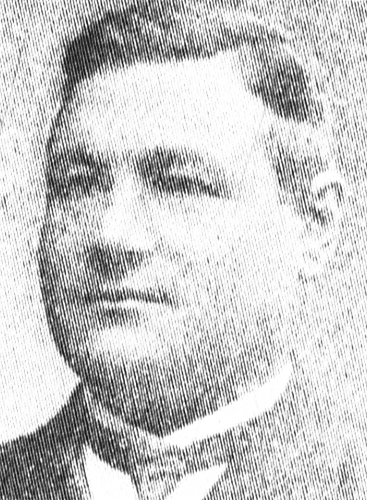

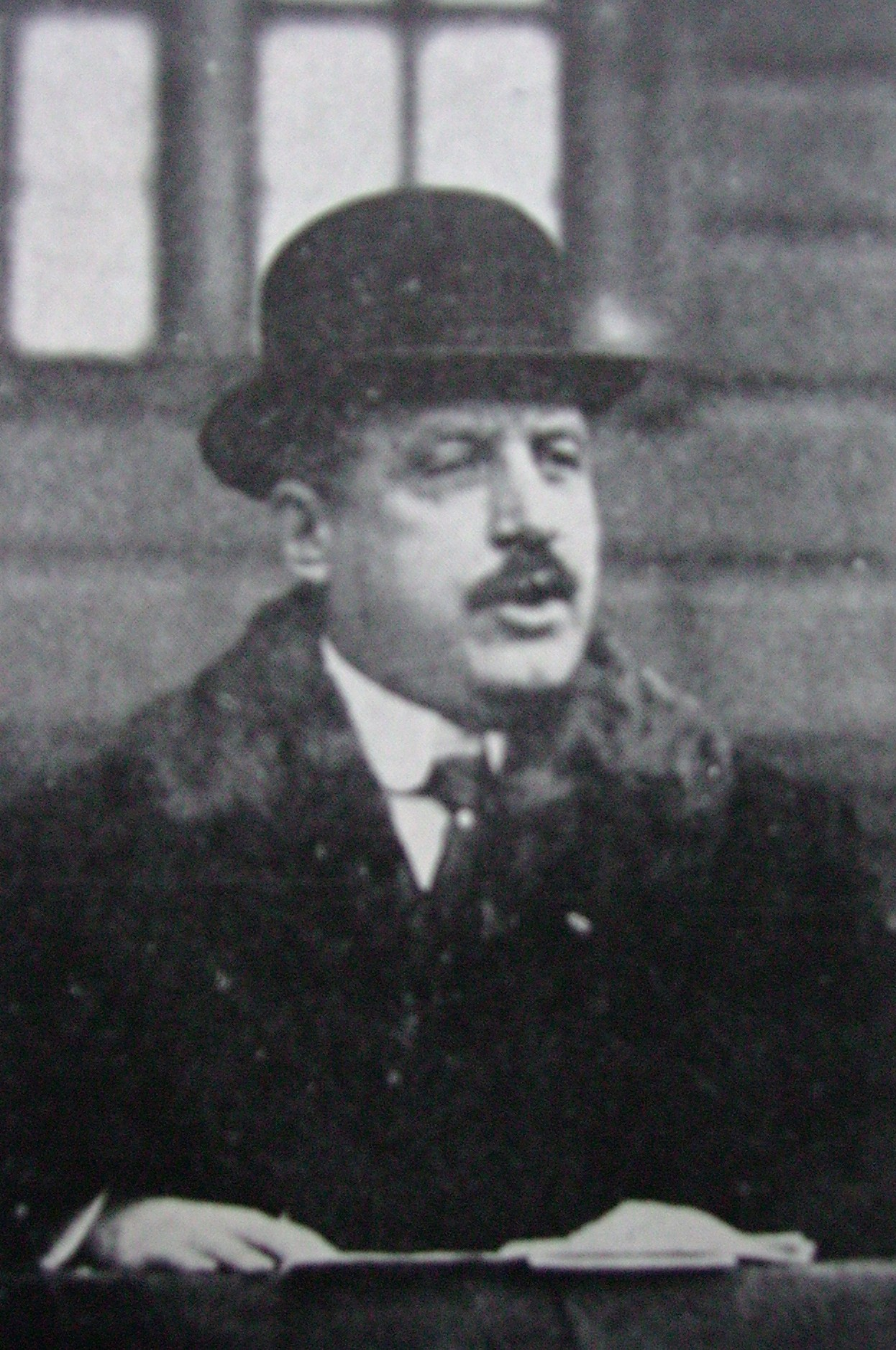

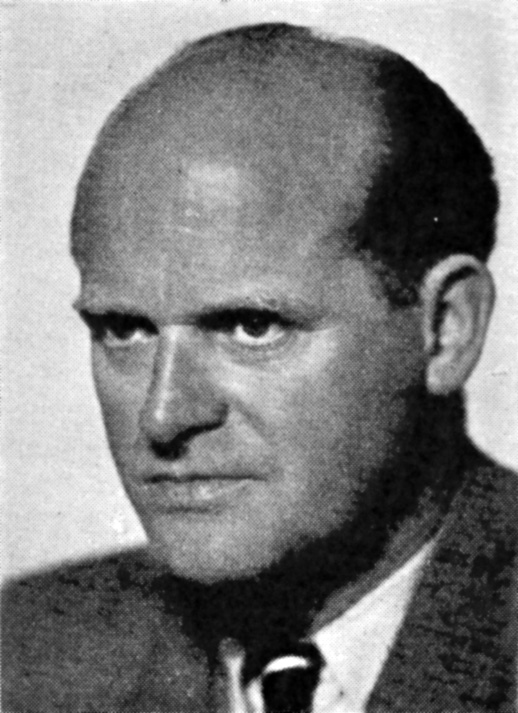

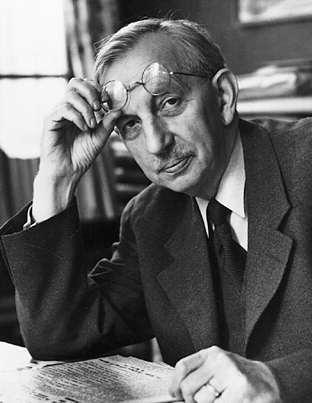
| | First party | Second party | Third party |
|---|---|---|---|
| Leader | Hjalmar Branting | Arvid Lindman | Carl Gustaf Ekman |
| Party | Social Democrats | Electoral League | Free-minded |
| Last election | 93 | 62 | 41 |
| Seats won | 104 | 65 | 29 |
| Seat change | ▲11 | ▲3 | ▼12 |
| Popular vote | 725,407 | 461,257 | 228,913 |
| Percentage | 41.09% | 26.12% | 12.97% |
| | Fourth party | Fifth party | Sixth party |
| Leader | Johan Andersson | Eliel Löfgren | Nils Flyg |
| Party | Farmers' League | Liberals | Communist |
| Last election | 21 | – | 7 |
| Seats won | 23 | 4 | 4 |
| Seat change | ▲2 | New | ▼3 |
| Popular vote | 190,396 | 69,627 | 63,301 |
| Percentage | 10.78% | 3.94% | 3.60% |
| | Seventh party |
| Leader | Zeth Höglund |
| Party | Höglund Communist |
| Last election | – |
| Seats won | 1 |
| Seat change | New |
| Popular vote | 26,301 |
| Percentage | 1.49% |
- Largest bloc and seats won by constituency
Prime Minister before election
Ernst Trygger
Electoral League
PM-elect
Hjalmar Branting
Social Democrats

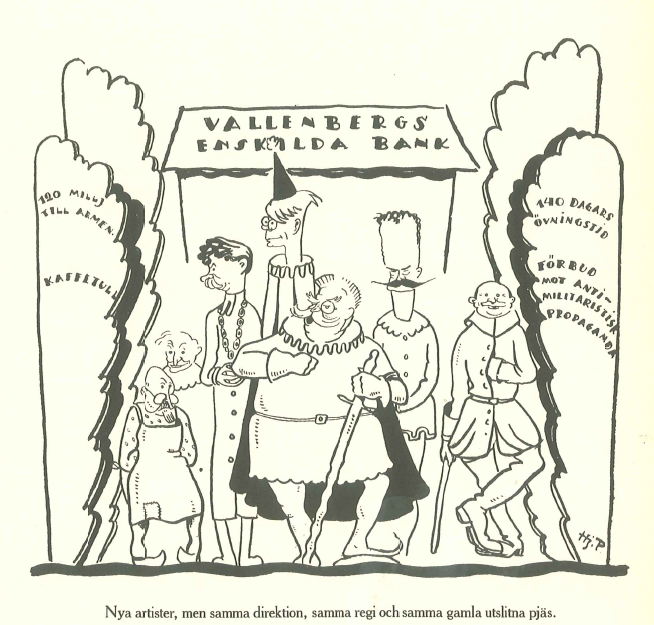
Caricature in a communist newspaper, on the new government formed by Hjalmar Branting after the elections

General elections were held in Sweden between 19 and 21 September 1924. The Swedish Social Democratic Party remained the largest party, winning 104 of the 230 seats in the Second Chamber of the Riksdag.

== Results ==
| Party | Votes | % | Seats | +/– |
|---|---|---|---|---|
| Swedish Social Democratic Party | 725,407 | 41.09 | 104 | +11 |
| General Electoral League | 461,257 | 26.12 | 65 | +3 |
| Free-minded National Association | 228,913 | 12.97 | 29 | –12 |
| Farmers' League | 190,396 | 10.78 | 23 | +2 |
| Liberal Party | 69,627 | 3.94 | 4 | New |
| Communist Party | 63,601 | 3.60 | 4 | –3 |
| Communist Party (Höglund Tendency) | 26,301 | 1.49 | 1 | New |
| Other parties | 84 | 0.00 | 0 | 0 |
| Total | 1,765,586 | 100.00 | 230 | 0 |
| Valid votes | 1,765,586 | 99.69 | | |
| Invalid/blank votes | 5,473 | 0.31 | | |
| Total votes | 1,771,059 | 100.00 | | |
| Registered voters/turnout | 3,338,892 | 53.04 | | |
Source: Nohlen & Stöver

== Aftermath ==
After the election the Cabinet of Ernst Trygger resigned and Gustav V asked Hjalmar Branting to form a new Cabinet which the Social Democratic leader accepted.
