= Liberal Coalition Party =

Swedish political party

Liberal Coalition Party Liberala samlingspartiet
- Chamber: First Chamber; Second Chamber
- Foundation: 16 January 1900
- Dissolution: 1924
- National affiliation: Free-minded National Association
- President: Sixten von Friesen (first); Nils Edén (last)
- Ideology: Liberalism

The Liberal Coalition Party (Swedish: Liberala samlingspartiet) was a parliamentary group of the Free-minded National Association in Swedish Parliament. It was founded in 1900 from a coalition of reform-minded parliamentarians from Parliamentary People's Party and others, such as rural discussion clubs and part of the Lantmanna Party. It quickly became influential and in 1902 founded its nationwide political party, the Free-minded National Association. Its new liberal progamme was characterized by advocating for universal male suffrage and parliamentary democracy. Under leaders like Sixten von Friesen and later Karl Staaff, the parliamentary party gained power and formed governments, working closely with the Social Democrats. Key reforms included constitutional changes and expanded voting rights, though internal disagreements—especially over defense policy and prohibition—eventually weakened the party.

After Staaff’s death in 1915, leadership passed to Nils Edén, who led a coalition government that implemented major democratic reforms. However, tensions between the party’s rural, pro-prohibition wing and its urban, culturally liberal faction deepened. These internal divisions culminated in a formal split of parliamentarians from newly founded Liberal Party of Sweden in 1923. As a result, the Liberal Coalition Party dissolved, ending its role in Swedish politics. Free-minded National Association named its new parliamentary caucus as Free-minded People's Party, while Liberal Party of Sweden founded parliamentary caucus called Liberal Riksdag Party.

== History ==
The Liberal Coalition Party, a Swedish parliamentary party, was founded on 16 January 1900. It emerged from a coalition formed around the issue of voting rights, uniting reform-minded members of the Second Chamber under the leadership of Sixten von Friesen during the final stages of the 1899 parliamentary session. The party quickly gained 82 seats. The People's Party fully merged into the new organization, and von Friesen became chair of the party’s council. Initially, the party leadership was dominated by moderately liberal rural representatives. Its main policy goal was to secure universal suffrage for all men over 25 who met municipal voting qualifications. However, the rapid progress of the suffrage movement in the following years forced the party to adjust its stance. In 1902, its national wing—the Free-minded National Association—publicly supported general (male) suffrage. When the government proposed proportional voting in 1904 and 1905, the party did not outright reject it but insisted it be applied to both chambers of Parliament. After von Friesen moved to the First Chamber, party leadership gradually shifted to Karl Staaff. In November 1905, Staaff formed a government with the main objective of implementing universal suffrage through majority voting in single-member districts. But when the First Chamber rejected the suffrage bill in 1906, his government resigned in May that year.

In 1907, about 20 party members, led by Daniel Persson in Tällberg, helped pass Prime Minister Arvid Lindman's proposal for proportional voting in both chambers, which also significantly restricted municipal voting rights. Later that year, the Free-minded National Association dropped its opposition to the proposal but added several new goals to the party platform: implementing parliamentary government, achieving women’s suffrage, granting local veto rights on temperance issues, and introducing sweeping social reforms. The first election under the new voting system greatly strengthened the party, winning it 101 seats. Through effective cooperation with the Social Democratic Party, it gained control of the Second Chamber. Staaff returned as prime minister, dissolved the First Chamber, and increased the party’s representation there from 15 to 51 members—making it the largest party in Parliament. Staaff retained overall leadership. The 1912–1914 parliamentary session was dominated by debates over national defense. Internal divisions began to appear, some directed at Staaff, especially after his 21 December 1913 speech in Karlskrona outlining the government’s defense policy. The “Peasant March” and the King’s Courtyard Speech on 6 February 1914, along with subsequent events, temporarily united the party. In a manifesto issued after Staaff’s resignation on 12 February, the party warned that “the Free-minded’s chief goal—a parliamentary system based on public trust—was now in danger.”

In the March 1914 elections for the Second Chamber, the party suffered a heavy defeat, falling to 71 seats. When World War I broke out later that year, Staaff and most of the party supported Prime Minister Hjalmar Hammarskjöld’s defense policy. However, around 30 members from the party’s more radical pro-defense wing declared their opposition, further weakening the party. In the regular elections that September, the party dropped to just 57 seats. After Staaff’s death on 4 October 1915, the party couldn’t immediately agree on new leadership. Instead, a five-member council led the party during the 1916–1917 parliamentary sessions. The council included Daniel Persson in Tällberg, Nils Edén, Raoul Hamilton, Herman Kvarnzelius, and Alfred Petersson. However, Edén quickly emerged as the party’s de facto leader. In the 1917 Second Chamber elections, the party partnered with the Social Democrats in some districts and gained 62 seats. In October that year, Edén formed a left-leaning government that included 7 Liberals and 4 Social Democrats. This coalition introduced constitutional reforms in 1918 and 1919 that fulfilled the party’s long-standing demands. However, conflicts over municipal taxation ended the cooperation with the Social Democrats in March 1920, and Edén’s government was replaced by Branting’s.

In the 1921 elections, the party’s seat count dropped to 41. By this time, a deep internal divide had taken root. A strongly pro-prohibition, generally more radical faction—mostly from rural areas—grew increasingly opposed to Edén and the so-called cultural-liberal, urban elite wing. Without the responsibility of governing, the party’s divisions became increasingly visible. A 1922 national referendum on prohibition failed to resolve the conflict. Under the leadership of G. and E. Ljunggren and Carl Gustaf Ekman, the prohibitionist wing of the Free-minded National Association steadily gained influence. At a party convention on 27 May 1923, the association formally split. With that, the Liberal Coalition Party ceased to exist.

== Chairpersons ==
- 1900–1905: Sixten von Friesen
- 1907–1915: Karl Staaff
- 1916–1917: Daniel Persson in Tällberg
- 1918–1923: Nils Edén

== Other officials ==
=== First Chamber ===
- 1916–1921: Herman Kvarnzelius (chairman)
- 1922–1922: Herman Kvarnzelius (vice chairman)
- 1923–1923: Carl Gustaf Ekman (second vice chairman)

=== Second Chamber ===
- 1918–1920: Raoul Hamilton (chairman)
- 1920–1921: Nils Edén (chairman)
- 1916–1917: Raoul Hamilton (vice chairman)
- 1921–1922: Raoul Hamilton (vice chairman)
- 1923–1923: Raoul Hamilton (second vice chairman)
