= Staffan Burenstam Linder =

Swedish economist and politician

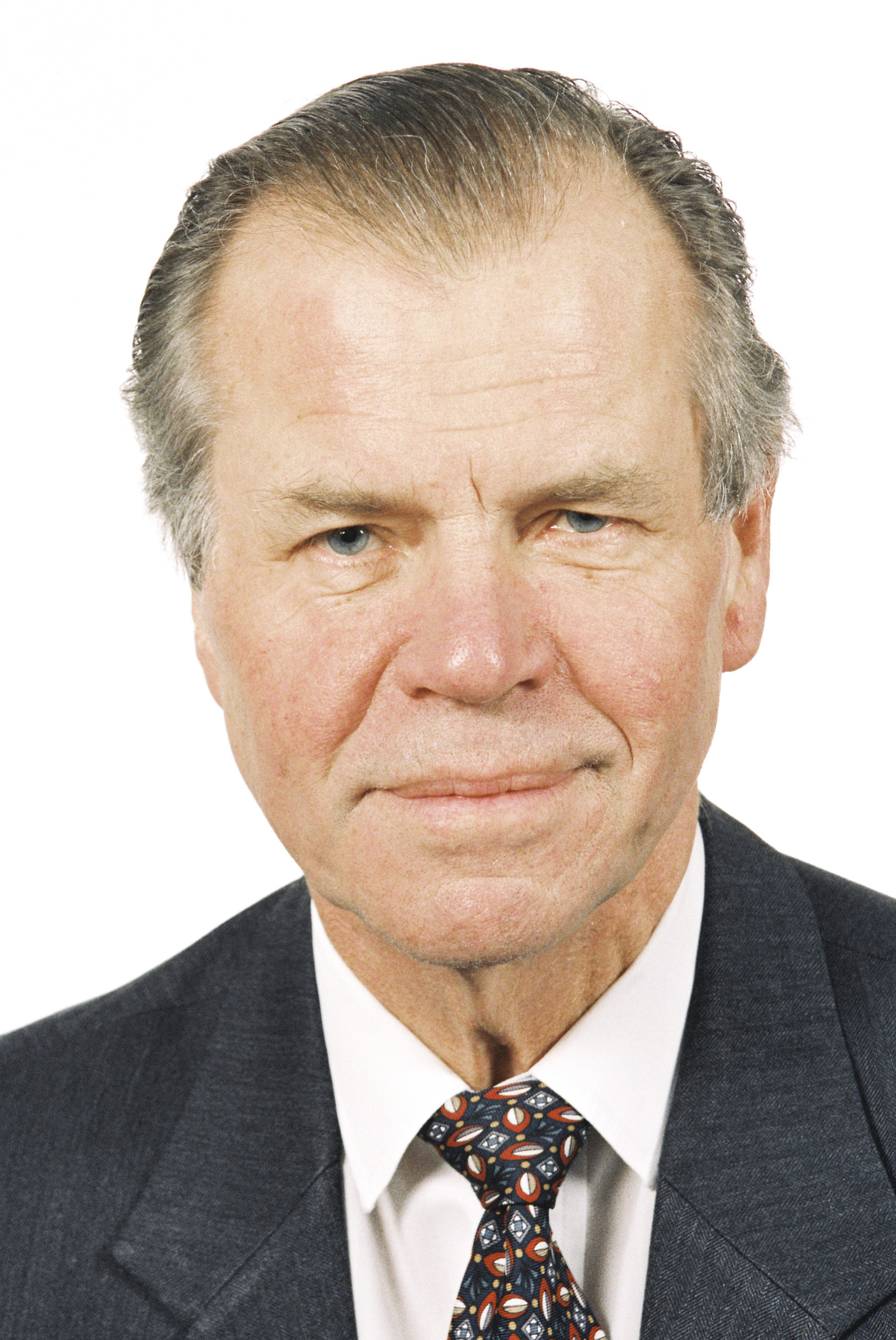
- Burenstam Linder in 1994

Member of the European Parliament for Sweden
- In office 1995 – 22 July 2000

Member of Parliament
- In office 1969–1986
- Constituency: Stockholm County

Minister of Commerce and Industry
- In office 1976–1978, 1979–1981

President of the Stockholm School of Economics
- In office 1986–1995

Personal details
- Born: Hans Martin Staffan Linder; 13 September 1931
- Died: 2 July 2000 (aged 68)
- Party: Moderate Party

Hans Martin Staffan Burenstam Linder (né Linder; 13 September 1931 – 22 July 2000) was a Swedish economist and conservative politician, who was Minister of Commerce and Industry from 1976 to 1978 and from 1979 to 1981. He was the president of the Stockholm School of Economics between 1986 and 1995.

== Background ==
He was the son of forester Martin Linder and Marianne Linder, née Burenstam. In 1956 he married Marie-Thérèse Dyrssen, who was headmaster of Enskilda Gymnasiet from 1989–2003.

As an adult, Staffan Linder began to use the name Burenstam, whose last bearer, his grandfather Fredrik Burenstam, had died in 1949. He still used the name Linder in his academic publications, and it was not until the 1980s that his family legally changed their name to Burenstam Linder.

== Academic career ==
During his time as a PhD candidate, he was mainly supervised by Bertil Ohlin. His dissertation in 1961, An Essay on Trade and Transformation, initiated a new model of international trade based on the demand pattern known as the Linder hypothesis.

Linder was a professor of International economics at the Stockholm School of Economics from 1974 onwards, as well as the school's rector from 1986 to 1995.

He was a visiting professor at Columbia University from 1962 to 1963, Yale University in 1966, and Stanford University from 1983 to 1984. He received an honorary doctorate from the Université catholique de Louvain. He was also an economic advisor at Stockholms Enskilda Bank from 1965–75. In the period 1993–1995, Burenstam Linder chaired the Steering Committee of the EuroFaculty, which included the Stockholm School of Economics in Riga as he founded in 1994.

== Political career ==
Burenstam Linder had long been a key figure in the Moderate Party. There were several times when people thought he would take the office of party leader, especially during the late 1970s, when many thought he should succeed Gösta Bohman.

His political positions include Member of Parliament from 1969 to 1986 (representing Stockholms län), Vice Leader of the Moderate Party from 1970 to 1981, Minister of Commerce and Industry from 1976 to 1978 and from 1979 to 1981, appointed a member of the Board of Governors of the Sveriges Riksbank (Riksbanksfullmäktige) from 1991 to 1994 and member of the European Parliament from 1995 to 2000.

== Publications ==
- (1961) An Essay on Trade and Transformation OCLC 2683384
- (1965) Trade and Trade Policy for Development OCLC 274224
- (1969) Den rastlösa välfärdsmänniskan (lit.: The restless Welfare Person) OCLC 474148381
- (1970) The Harried Leisure Class ISBN 978-0-231-08649-3
- (1970) Statsmakt eller maktstat? (lit.: Power of State or Dictatorship?) OCLC 10289248
- (1983) Den hjärtlösa välfärdsstaten (lit.: the heartless Welfare State) ISBN 91-7566-028-8
- (1986) The Pacific century: economic and political consequences of Asian-Pacific dynamism ISBN 0-8047-1294-8; also appeared in Swedish as Den nya Nya Världen: de ekonomiska och politiska konsekvenserna av den dynamiska utvecklingen i Stillahavsregionen ISBN 91-7566-102-0

== Sources ==
- Godbey, G. C. "Time deepening and the future of leisure". Leisure Today (September 1976).
- Godbey, G. C. "The harried leisure class". Journal of Leisure Research (2003).
- John P. Robinson; Geoffrey Godbey (1997). Time for life: The surprising ways Americans use their time. Foreword by Robert D. Putnam. Penn State Press. ISBN 978-0-271-01652-8.
- Carl Uggla (2006). Staffan Burenstam Linder - den visionära handlingsmänniskan (in Swedish). Ekerlids förlag. ISBN 91-7092-045-1.
