= Hjalmar Branting =

Swedish politician (1860–1925)

His Excellency Hjalmar Branting
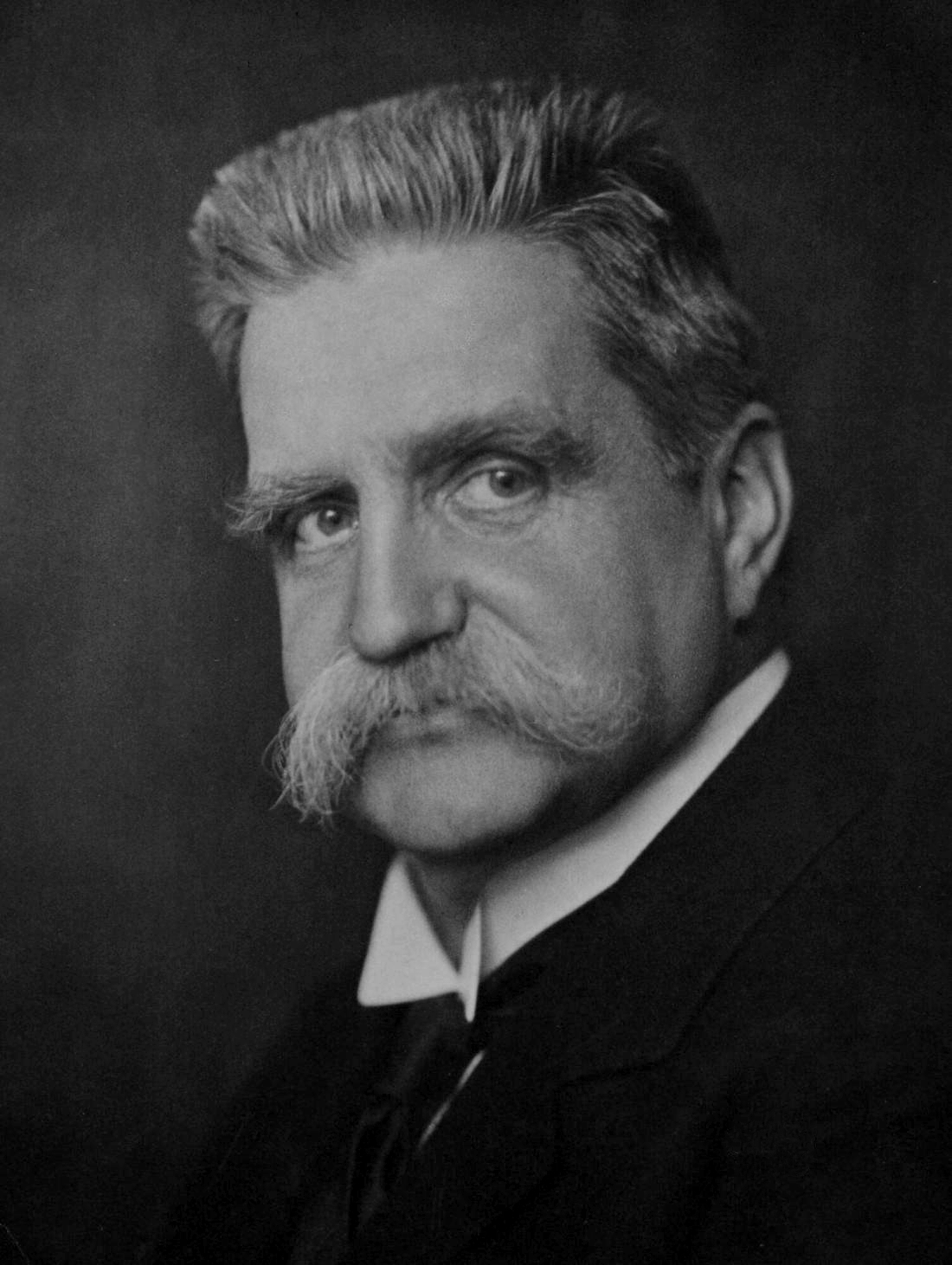
- Branting in 1917

Prime Minister of Sweden
- In office 18 October 1924 – 24 January 1925
- Monarch: Gustaf V
- Preceded by: Ernst Trygger
- Succeeded by: Rickard Sandler
- In office 13 October 1921 – 19 April 1923
- Monarch: Gustaf V
- Preceded by: Oscar von Sydow
- Succeeded by: Ernst Trygger
- In office 10 March 1920 – 27 October 1920
- Monarch: Gustaf V
- Preceded by: Nils Edén
- Succeeded by: Louis de Geer

Minister for Foreign Affairs
- In office 13 October 1921 – 19 April 1923
- Prime Minister: Himself
- Preceded by: Herman Wrangel
- Succeeded by: Carl Hederstierna

Minister for Finance
- In office 19 October 1917 – 5 January 1918
- Prime Minister: Nils Edén
- Preceded by: Conrad Carleson
- Succeeded by: Fredrik Vilhelm Thorsson

Personal details
- Born: Karl Hjalmar Branting; 23 November 1860 Stockholm, Sweden
- Died: 24 February 1925 (aged 64) Stockholm, Sweden
- Party: Social Democrats
- Spouse: Anna Branting (née Jäderin)
- Children: Georg Branting; Sonja Branting-Westerståhl
- Cabinet: Branting I cabinet Branting II cabinet Branting III cabinet

Karl Hjalmar Branting (Swedish pronunciation: [ˈjǎlmar ˈbrânːtɪŋ]; 23 November 1860 – 24 February 1925) was a Swedish statesman and diplomat who served as Prime Minister of Sweden on three occasions from 1920 to 1925. From 1907 until his death in 1925, Branting led the Social Democratic Party (SAP), playing a major role in advocating universal suffrage, an eight-hour workday, and other labor rights. He was also instrumental in foreign policy, including his support for the League of Nations. In 1921, Branting shared the Nobel Peace Prize with the Norwegian secretary-general of the Inter-Parliamentary Union, Christian Lous Lange.

== Biography ==
Born to the professor Lars Gabriel Branting and the noblewoman and pianist Emma af Georgii, Branting was educated in Stockholm and at Uppsala University. He developed a scientific background in mathematical astronomy and was an assistant at the Stockholm Observatory, but gave up his devotion to scientific work to become a journalist in 1884 and began editing the newspapers Tiden and Social-Demokraten. The latter was official media outlet of the Swedish Social Democratic Party. His decision to publish an article by the more radical socialist Axel Danielsson, a piece denounced by opponents as insulting to religious sensitivities, resulted in political convictions for blasphemy and imprisonment for both men. Branting was imprisoned for three months in 1888.

Together with August Palm, Branting was one of the main organizers of the Swedish Social Democratic Party in 1889. He was its first Member of Parliament from 1896 and for six years the only one.

In the early years of the 20th century, Branting led the Social Democrats in opposing a war to force Norway to remain in a personal union with Sweden. When the crisis came in 1905, he coined the slogan "Hands off Norway, King!" The Social Democrats organized resistance to a call-up of reserves and made preparations for a general strike against a war; historians now acclaim this as a major factor in Norway's peaceful independence. In 1908 Branting established a monthly theoretical political journal entitled Tiden which is still in publication.

Branting accepted Eduard Bernstein's revision of Marxism and became a reformist socialist, advocating a peaceful transition from capitalism towards socialism. He believed that if workers were given the vote through universal suffrage, socialist legislation could be brought through the Riksdag. Branting supported the February Revolution in Russia in 1917. He supported the moderate Mensheviks against Lenin's more extreme Bolsheviks and defended the government of Alexander Kerensky, whom he even personally visited in Petrograd. When the October Revolution broke out in the winter of that year, Branting condemned the Bolshevik seizure of power. 1917 saw a split in the Swedish Social Democratic Party on this question, and the youth league and the revolutionary sections of the party broke away and formed the Social Democratic Left Party of Sweden, initially headed by Zeth Höglund, which soon reorganized as the Swedish Communist Party. Höglund later returned to the Social Democratic Party after Branting's death, and wrote a two-volume biography of Branting.

As prime minister, Branting brought Sweden into the League of Nations and was personally active as a delegate within it. When the question of whether Åland should be handed over to Sweden after the independence of Finland from Russia was brought up, he let the League decide upon the issue; the islands became an autonomous region of Finland. He was awarded the Nobel Peace Prize in 1921 for his work in the League of Nations, sharing the prize with the Norwegian Christian Lous Lange. Branting was a supporter of false claims that French colonial troops were committing mass rapes during the occupation of the Rhineland. On 10 May 1920, he declared that as a white man he was outraged that the French would deploy African troops in the Rhineland.

Branting died in Stockholm at the age of 64 on 24 February 1925, four months after being sworn in for a third term as prime minister following the SAP's victory in the 1924 general election. He was succeeded as prime minister by Rickard Sandler; Per Albin Hansson became party chairman, later serving as prime minister from 1932 to 1946.

== Monuments and memorials ==
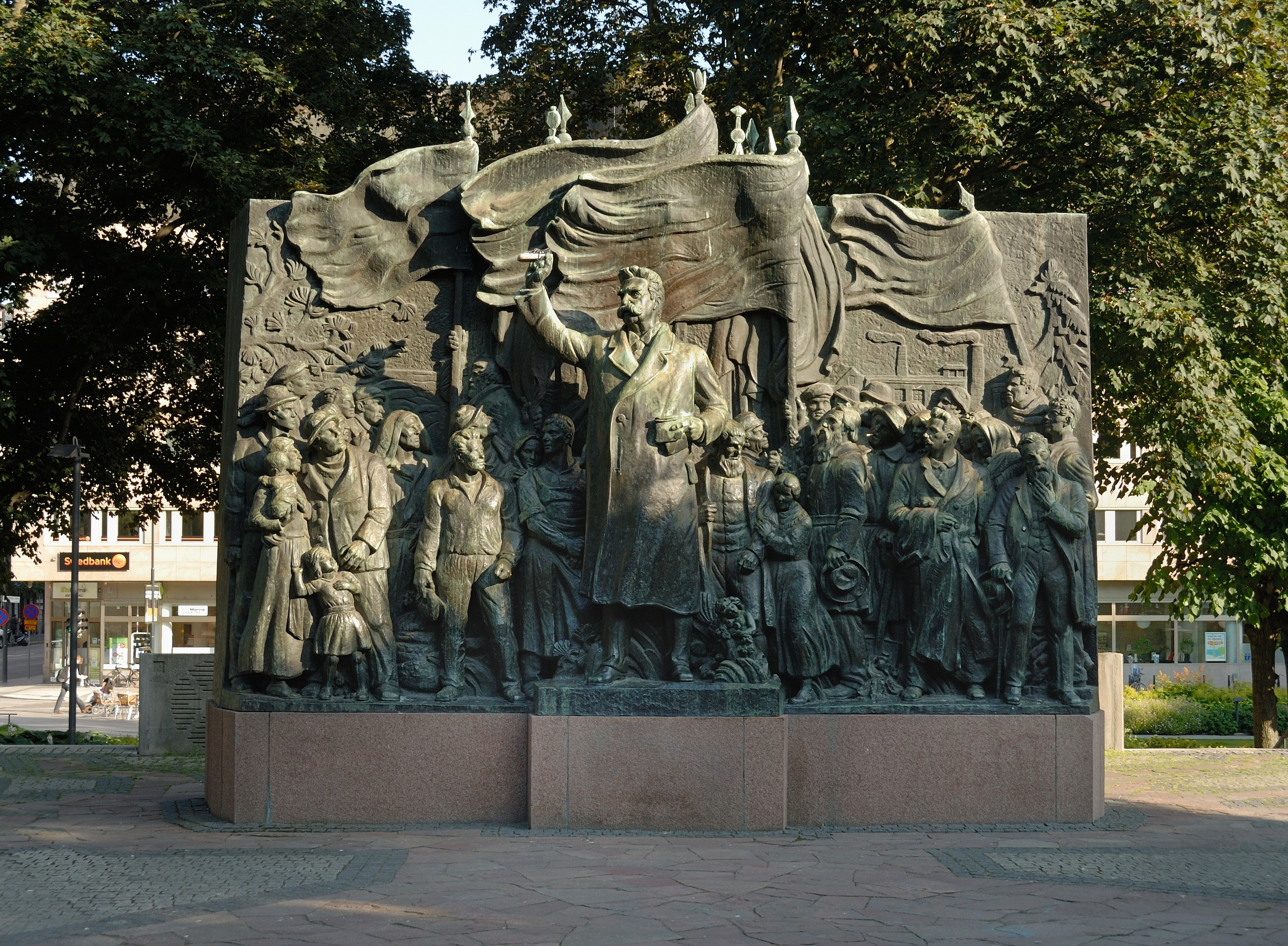
Monument to Branting at Stockholm

Branting is commemorated by the Branting Monument in Stockholm. Additionally in Gothenburg, there is a tram and bus interchange named after Branting (Swedish: Hjalmar Brantingsplatsen). Stockholms Plads (Stockholm Square) in Copenhagen was renamed Hjalmar Brantings Plads in 1925.

== See also ==
- 1921 Swedish general election

Party political offices
Preceded by Claes Tholin	Leader of the Social Democratic Party; 1907–1925	Succeeded by Per Albin Hansson
Political offices
Preceded by Conrad Carleson	Minister for Finance; 1917–1918	Succeeded by Fredrik Thorsson
Preceded by Nils Edén	Prime Minister of Sweden; 1920	Succeeded by Louis De Geer
Preceded by Herman Wrangel	Minister for Foreign Affairs; 1921–1923	Succeeded by Carl Hederstierna
Preceded by Oscar von Sydow	Prime Minister of Sweden; 1921–1923	Succeeded by Ernst Trygger
Preceded by Ernst Trygger	Prime Minister of Sweden; 1924–1925	Succeeded by Rickard Sandler
