= Carl Gustaf Ekman =

Swedish politician (1872–1945)

His Excellency Carl Gustaf Ekman
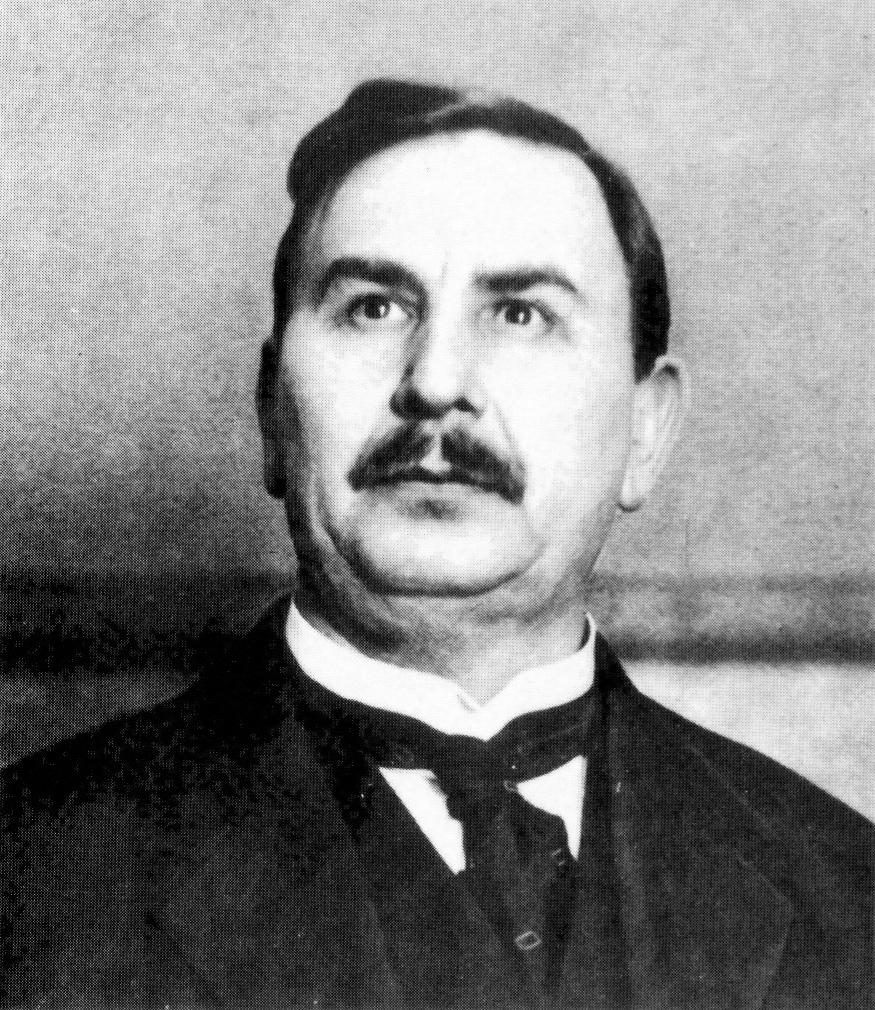
- Ekman, c. 1930s

Prime Minister of Sweden
- In office 7 June 1930 – 6 August 1932
- Monarch: Gustaf V
- Preceded by: Arvid Lindman
- Succeeded by: Felix Hamrin
- In office 7 June 1926 – 2 October 1928
- Monarch: Gustaf V
- Preceded by: Rickard Sandler
- Succeeded by: Arvid Lindman

Minister of Defence
- In office 7 June 1930 – 19 June 1931
- Prime Minister: Himself
- Preceded by: Harald Malmberg
- Succeeded by: Anton Rundqvist

Minister of Finance
- In office 7 June 1926 – 30 September 1926
- Prime Minister: Himself
- Preceded by: Ernst Wigforss
- Succeeded by: Ernst Lyberg

Personal details
- Born: 6 October 1872 Munktorp, Sweden
- Died: 15 June 1945 (aged 72) Stockholm, Sweden
- Party: Freeminded People's
- Spouse: Laura Widlund (m. 1900)
- Children: 4
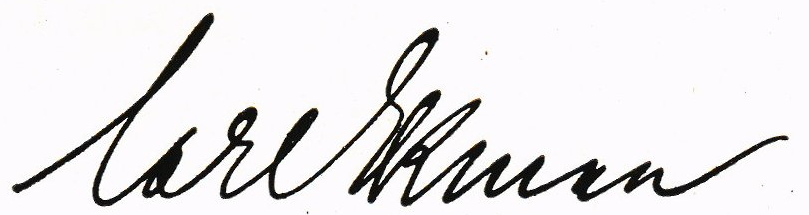
- Signature

Carl Gustaf Ekman (6 October 1872 – 15 June 1945) was a Swedish liberal politician and statesman who served twice as Prime Minister of Sweden from 1926 to 1928 and from 1930 to 1932. He was also leader of the Free-Minded National Association from 1923 to 1934. He represented several constituencies as a member of the riksdag (MP) from 1911 to 1932, first of the upper house from 1911 to 1928, and then of the lower house from 1929 to 1932. Ekman’s ability to influence the balance of power between Sweden’s major political blocs during the 1920s and 1930s resulted in him being nicknamed the "Arbiter of the realm" (Riksvågsmästaren).

== Biography ==
Carl Gustaf Ekman was born in Munktorp (now Köping Municipality) in Västmanland County, to farmer and soldier Carl Ekman and Josefina Säfström. He began working at the age of twelve as a farmhand, read everything he could get his hands on, and was entrusted with duties inside the temperance movement, where he became a functionary. He was promoted to director of the Friends of the Temperance Movement's disability and burial fund in the industrial town of Eskilstuna. In 1908 he was appointed as chief editor of the liberal newspaper Eskiltuna-Kuriren. His attempt to be elected to the Riksdag failed because of the domination of the Social Democrats in Eskiltuna, but in 1911 the Liberal Party gave him a seat in the upper house for the county of Gävleborg. He quickly established himself as the country's leading proponent of total prohibition of alcohol. In 1913 he moved to Stockholm, and quickly won a seat representing the city in the Riksdag.

Ekman became the most influential and controversial politician of the 1920s. Among Social Democrats he was regarded as a "class traitor", having come from a working-class background, but having become a member of a non-socialist party. He was in fact behind the downfall of several Social Democrat governments: Hjalmar Branting's in 1923, Rickard Sandler's in 1926, but also that of Arvid Lindman in 1930. In 1924 Ekman became the leader of the newly formed Freeminded People's Party (Frisinnade folkpartiet), after those Liberals opposed to prohibition had departed to form the Liberal Party of Sweden.

As party leader he worked to strengthen the party's influence by cooperating with both the right and left. His strategy for power was based on controlling the political center in order to 'control the game', this being predicated upon no one bloc having a clear majority in the Riksdag.

After Sandler's fall from power in 1926, Ekman became Prime Minister for the first time. He was able to play the right off against the left by appealing to both and by doing so he became more successful than expected. He resolved an old debate on local taxes with a law on proportional taxation, which is still in effect to this day. He also concluded a sweeping reform of the school system. In the 1928 elections the conservative General Electoral League won, and he was forced to give up power to Arvid Lindman.

Ekman returned as prime minister in 1930, when he and Per Albin Hansson defeated the government's proposal to raise tariffs on grain. His second period as prime minister was difficult; the international depression that had begun after the Wall Street crash of 1929 reached Sweden, affecting both industry and agriculture. Ekman's traditional attitude of thriftiness made it difficult for him to accept economic-stimulation programs that would involve heavy public spending.

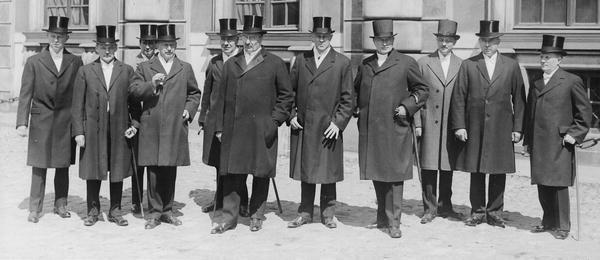
Ekman's second government

In addition to this, a debate began after the Kreuger Crash about political contributions from Ivar Kreuger which Ekman had personally accepted on behalf of his party. At first Ekman denied having received any such money, but in the end the public debate forced him to resign from office a month before the Riksdag election of 1932, which resulted in a great defeat for the Freeminded People's Party. Ekman never returned to politics. Less than two years after his resignation, his party was also gone; it merged with the Liberal Party to form the Liberal People's Party (Folkpartiet liberalerna). Not even his enemies thought that he had actually taken money for himself; nevertheless his conflicting statements on the matter enabled others to cast suspicion on him, so that a formidable political opponent could be removed.

Ekman's legacy has been colored to a great extent by his political maneuvering as well as by the scandal leading to his resignation; this does not do justice to his result-oriented policies during an anxious period when no lasting political majority could be formed. He died in Stockholm on 15 June 1945.

He was married to Laura Ekman (née Widlund), with whom he had four children.

Party political offices
Preceded by Party constituted	Chairman of the Freeminded People's Party; 1924–1932	Succeeded by Felix Hamrin
Political offices
Preceded by Rickard Sandler	Prime Minister of Sweden; 1926–1928	Succeeded by Arvid Lindman
Preceded by Arvid Lindman	Prime Minister of Sweden; 1930–1932	Succeeded by Felix Hamrin
