= Rickard Sandler =

Swedish prime minister and politician (1884–1964)

His Excellency Rickard Sandler
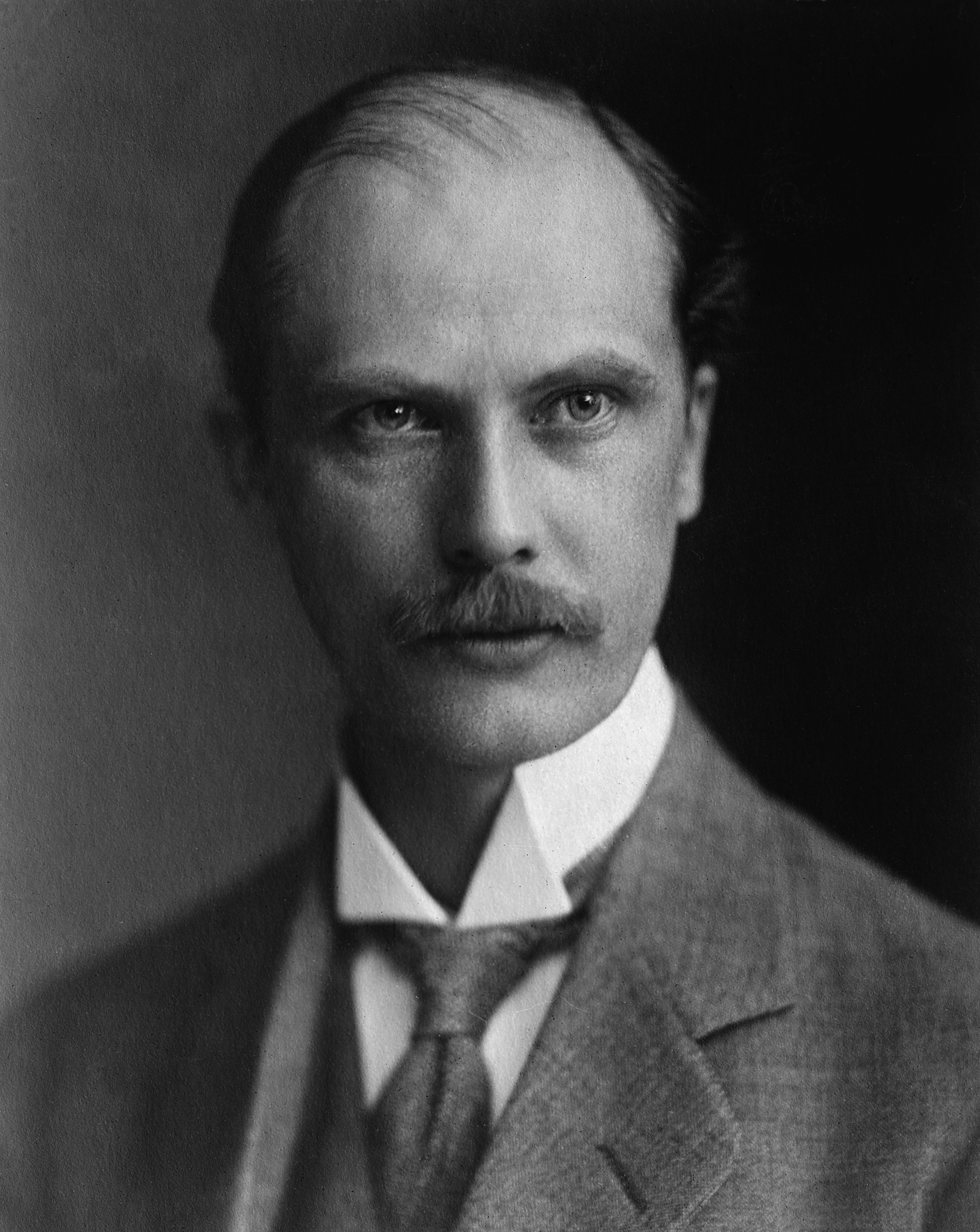
- Sandler, c. 1910

Prime Minister of Sweden
- In office 24 January 1925 – 7 June 1926
- Monarch: Gustaf V
- Preceded by: Hjalmar Branting
- Succeeded by: Carl Gustaf Ekman

Minister for Foreign Affairs
- In office 28 September 1936 – 13 December 1939
- Prime Minister: Per-Albin Hansson
- Preceded by: Karl Gustaf Westman
- Succeeded by: Christian Günther
- In office 24 September 1932 – 19 June 1936
- Prime Minister: Per-Albin Hansson
- Preceded by: Fredrik Ramel
- Succeeded by: Karl Gustaf Westman

Minister of Finance
- In office 30 June 1920 – 27 October 1920
- Prime Minister: Hjalmar Branting
- Preceded by: Fredrik Thorsson
- Succeeded by: Henric Tamm

Minister of Commerce and Industry
- In office 14 October 1924 – 24 January 1925
- Prime Minister: Ernst Trygger; Hjalmar Branting
- Preceded by: Frederik Thorsson
- Succeeded by: Henric Tamm

Personal details
- Born: Rickard Johannes Sandler; 29 January 1884 Torsåker, Sweden
- Died: 12 November 1964 (aged 80) Stockholm, Sweden
- Party: Social Democratic
- Spouse: Maria Lindberg (m. 1909)
- Children: 3
- Education: Uppsala University
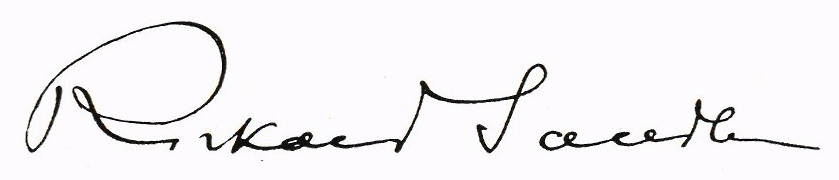
- Signature

Rickard Johannes Sandler (29 January 1884 – 12 November 1964) was a Swedish politician and writer who served as Prime Minister of Sweden from 1925 to 1926. He also served as Minister for Foreign Affairs from 1932 to 1939. Taking office at age 40, he is both the second-youngest, as well as the only social democratic prime minister to never serve as party leader. He represented several constituencies in the Riksdag across more than five decades from 1912 until his death in 1964, making him the longest-serving Member of Parliament in Swedish history.

== Early life and career ==
Rickard Sandler was born in Torsåker parish (now Kramfors Municipality), Västernorrland County. His father Johan Sandler was a headmaster at a folk high school and later a Member of Parliament. After receiving a Bachelor of Arts degree from Uppsala University, Rickard Sandler became a teacher at a folk high school in Kramfors (where his father was headmaster) and another in Brunnsvik. After joining the Swedish Social Democratic Youth League, Sandler's political career took off. He received a Licentiate of Arts degree in 1911 at the age of 26, after which he became a member of the board of the Social Democratic Party, and would remain a member until 1952. In 1917 he became editor-in-chief for Ny Tid, a social democratic newspaper in Gothenburg.

== Rise in politics ==
In 1918, during the government of Nils Edén, Sandler became State Secretary for Minister for Finance, Fredrik Thorsson. He continued in the same capacity when Hjalmar Branting became head of government in 1920. When Thorsson went on to head the new Ministry of Commerce and Industry later that same year, Sandler briefly took his place as Minister of Finance from July to October 1920. Following the first democratic Swedish election in 1921, Sandler became a minister without portfolio until 1923. In 1924, in Branting’s third cabinet, he was offered the position of Minister for Foreign Trade. Sandler only accepted the role following some persuasion, as he had instead intended to take up a job as headmaster of a folk high school in Brunnsvik.

== As Prime Minister ==
When Branting resigned in early 1925 due to an illness he never recovered from, the most apparent successor was Minister for Finance, Fredrik Thorsson. However, Thorsson also fell ill and died later that spring. This resulted in the 41-year-old Sandler being appointed head of government.

As Prime Minister, Sandler was tasked with reducing military expenditure, as had been promised during the election campaign. He was supported by the Free-minded People's Party in what became the largest disarmament in Sweden. Following disarmament, the issue of unemployment came into focus when the government annulled a decision by the Unemployment Commission (arbetslöshetskommissionen) to deny payment to workers at the Stripa mine who were on strike. The liberal and conservative parties, who together held the majority of seats in the Riksdag, disagreed with the government, called for a vote of no confidence, and brought down the government. The 1928 elections resulted in Arvid Lindman, leader of the General Electoral League, becoming the prime minister once again.

== Foreign affairs ==
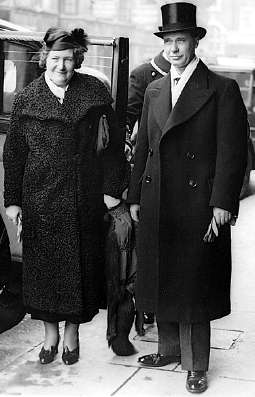
Rickard Sandler on his way to meet King George VI in London in 1937. His wife Maria (Maja) Sandler on the left.

Sandler returned to the government in 1932 as Minister for Foreign Affairs. In 1939, Sandler left the government following a disagreement with the Prime Minister Per Albin Hansson about the Winter War. Sandler wanted Sweden to actively help Finland after the Soviet Union had attacked it on 30 November 1939.

Now a deputy, Sandler continued to be influential in Swedish foreign policy. In 1940, he became a member of the Standing Committee on Foreign Affairs (utrikesutskottet), and was its chairman from 1946 to 1964. He was also a United Nations Delegate from 1947 to 1960.

== Other positions ==
Sandler was governor of Gävleborg County 1941 to 1952. He was chairman of several governmental inquiries, including the Socialization Committee (1920–1936), a commission appointed to audit the Swedish refugee policy during World War II, known as the Sandler Commission (1945–1947), and the Commission on the Constitution (1954 – 1963).

Sandler was one of the founders of The Workers' Enlightenment League (Arbetarnas Bildningsförbund ABF) in 1912. He was the main writer of the Marxist-oriented party program of the Social Democratic Party in 1920. He published the widely circulated statistical outline of social classes "The society as it is" (1911). From 1926 and 1932, he was director of Statistics Sweden (Statistiska centralbyrån). Sandler translated Das Kapital by Karl Marx into Swedish, and in 1943 he authored a book on literary and historic secret writings called Cipher.

Political offices
Preceded by Fredrik Thorsson	Minister for Finance; July – October 1920	Succeeded by Henric Tamm
Preceded by Fredrik Thorsson	Minister of Commerce and Industry; 1924 – 1925	Succeeded by Carl Svensson
Preceded by Hjalmar Branting	Prime Minister; 1925 – 1926	Succeeded by Carl Gustaf Ekman
Preceded by Fredrik Ramel	Minister for Foreign Affairs; 1932 – 1936	Succeeded by Karl Gustaf Westman
Preceded by Karl Gustaf Westman	Minister for Foreign Affairs; 1936 – 1939	Succeeded by Christian Günther
