= Liberal Party of Sweden =

Political party in Sweden

Liberal Party of Sweden Sveriges Liberala Parti
- Leader: Eliel Löfgren, (1923–1930); Ernst Lyberg, (1930–1933); Karl Andreas Andersson, (1933–1934)
- Founded: 1923
- Dissolved: 1934
- Split from: Free-minded National Association
- Merged into: Liberals
- Ideology: Classical liberalism Anti-Prohibition
- Political position: Right-wing

The Liberal Party of Sweden (Swedish: Sveriges Liberala Parti) was a political party in Sweden. It was formed in 1923 by the anti-prohibition minority of the Free-minded National Association as a consequence of the split over the issue on alcohol prohibition.

In 1934 the two parties reunited in the form of the People's Party.

== Leaders ==
- Eliel Löfgren, 1923–1930
- Ernst Lyberg, 1930–1933
- Karl Andreas Andersson, 1933–1934

== Election results ==
Riksdag
Date	Votes			Seats		Position	Size
Date	No.	%	± pp	No.	±	Position	Size
1924	69,627	3.94	New	4 / 230	New	Opposition	5th
1928	70,820	3.00	▼0.94	4 / 230	0	Opposition	▼6th
1932	48,722	1.95	▼1.05	4 / 230	0	Opposition	▼7th

== See also ==
- Liberalism and centrism in Sweden
