= 2023 Centre Party (Sweden) leadership election =

Swedish political party leadership election

2023 Centre Party leadership election
- 2 February 2023
- Nominations by the party districts.
Party Chairman before election
Annie Lööf
Elected Party Chairman
Muharrem Demirok

The Swedish Centre Party's party leadership election was held at an extraordinary party meeting on 2 February 2023 in Helsingborg. The Centre Party nominated Muharrem Demirok to succeed to outgoing party leader Annie Lööf.

== Background ==
In the 2022 general election, the Centre Party received 6.7% of the vote, which was a setback from the 2018 election result (-1.9) and the record election to the European Parliament in 2019 (-4.1). The party also went to the polls to support Magdalena Andersson as prime minister, and possibly join her government. In the election, the government lost to Ulf Kristersson's right-wing bloc.

On 15 September 2022, the then incumbent party leader Annie Lööf announced her resignation, citing that she was dissatisfied with the election results and that she wanted more time for her daughters and family, but the decision "was also made due to the hatred and threats directed at her person". During her party leadership, Annie Lööf managed to both lead a party with opinion figures during the parliamentary deadlock in 2013 and as the first woman to probe the possibilities for a new government by the Speaker (2018).

The election committee announced on 23 September that a new party leader will be elected at an extraordinary party meeting on 2 February, in connection with the party's municipal days in Helsingborg. The process will be kept open, where members, circles, districts and sister organizations can nominate their candidates until 14 October, after which the selection committee will present the possible candidates.

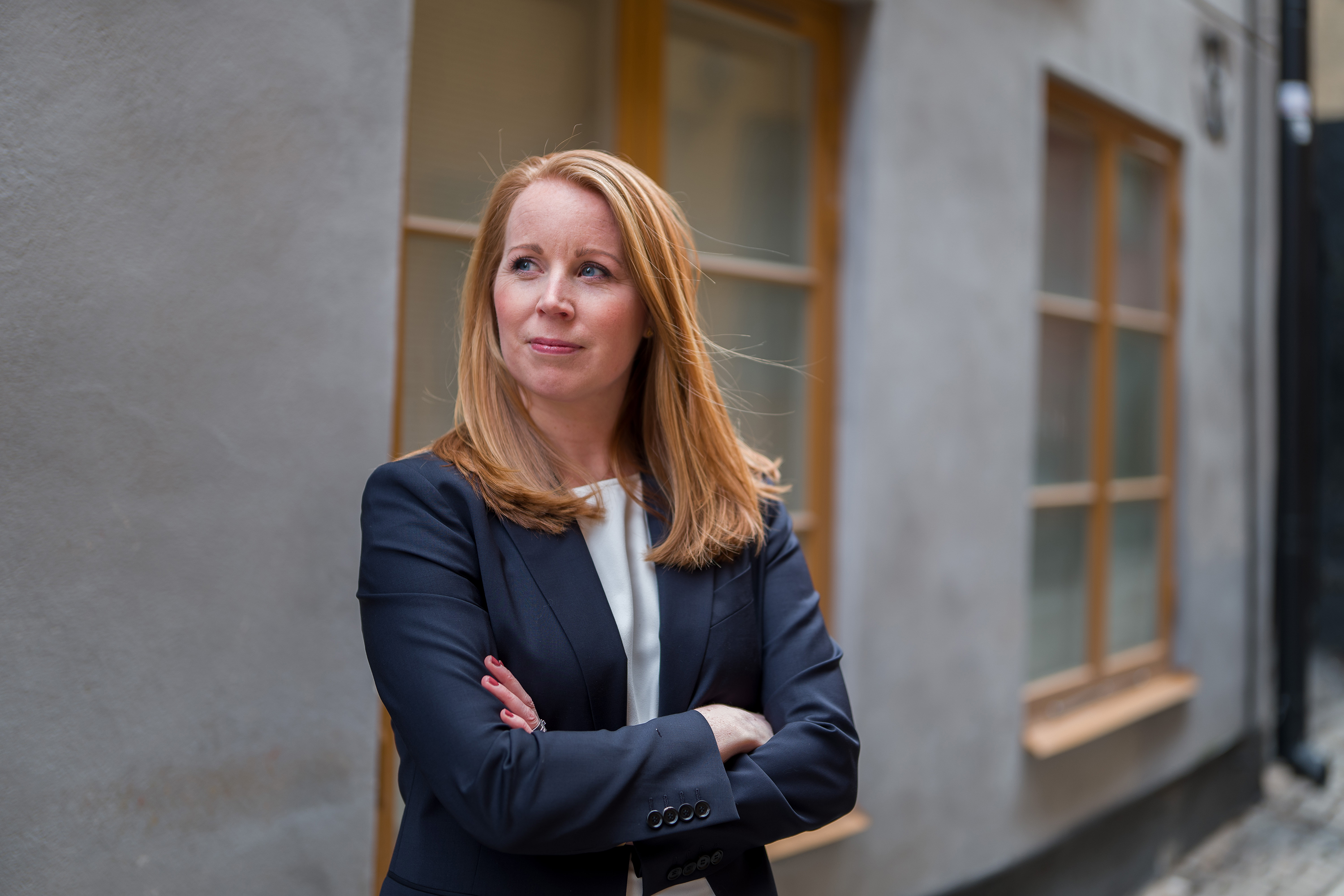
Annie Lööf led the Centre Party for 11 years.

One of the critical issues for the incoming party leader and management has been considered by observers to be the future relationship and possible cooperation with the Social Democrats. Since the January agreement, the Centre Party has had closer cooperation with the Social Democrats and supported the appointment of the governments Löfven II, Löfven III and Andersson. The question is whether the party should return to the former alliance cooperation and support a right-wing government, even if it cooperates with the Sweden Democrats, which during Lööf's party leadership was a red line.

The advance favorite for new party leader was considered to be the former economic and political spokesperson Emil Källström, but on 16 September, he declined a candidacy.

On 30 September, MEP Emma Wiesner announced her candidacy. On 14 October, the last day for nominations and the same day that the Tidö Agreement was presented, the housing policy spokesperson also announced to Member of Parliament Alireza Akhondi that he is available as party leader.

== Candidates ==
=== Withdrawn candidates ===
Name and photo	Birth date and birth place	Office held	Announcement date	Ref.	Endorsements
Emma Wiesner	11 November 1992 (age 33); Västerås, Sweden	Member of the European Parliament (2021–)	30 September 2022		Hanna Wagenius
Alireza Akhondi	20 September 1980 (age 45); Teheran, Iran	Member of the Riksdag (2018–), Housing policy spokesperson (2022–)	14 October 2022		

=== Potential candidates ===
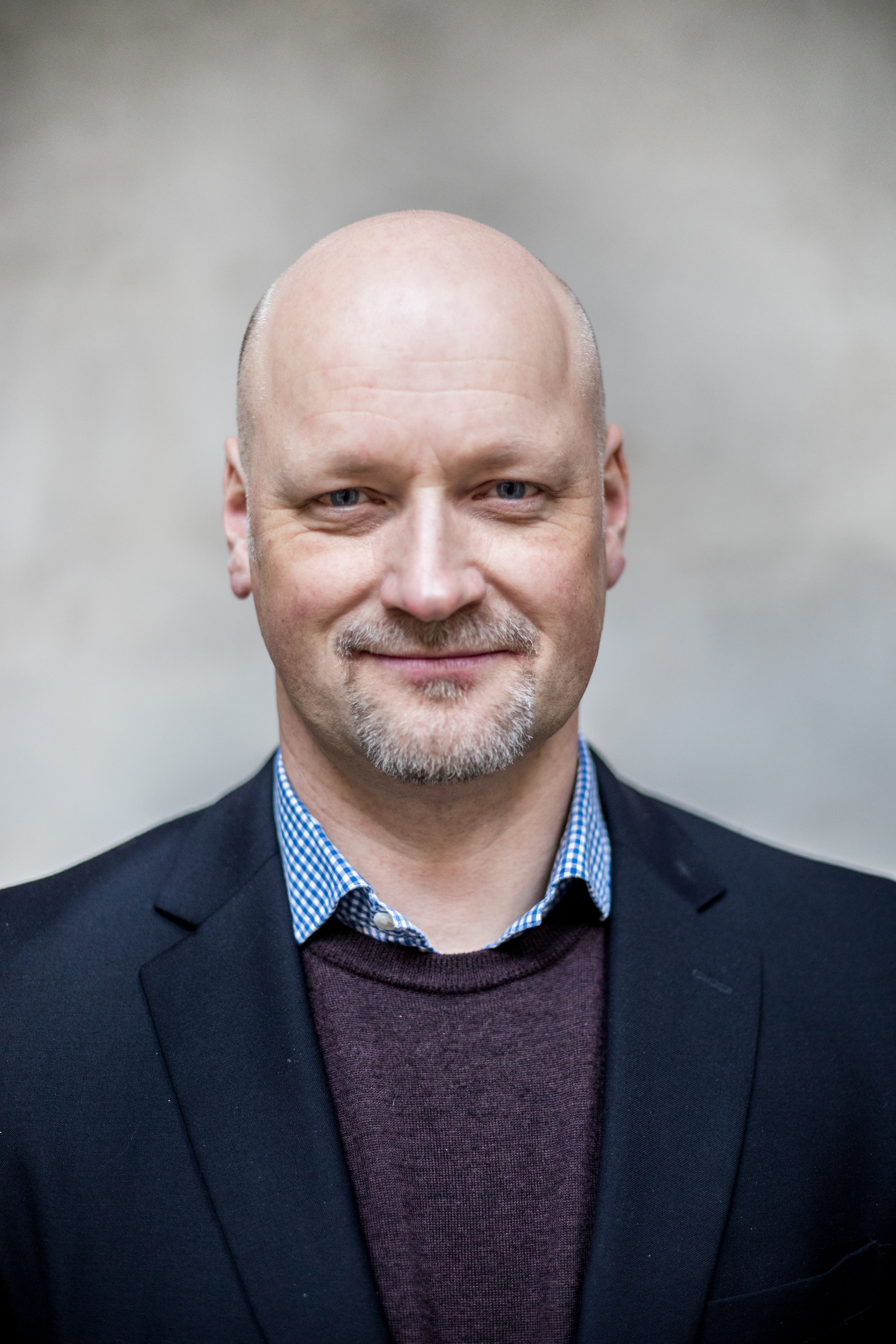
Parliamentary group leader
Daniel Bäckström

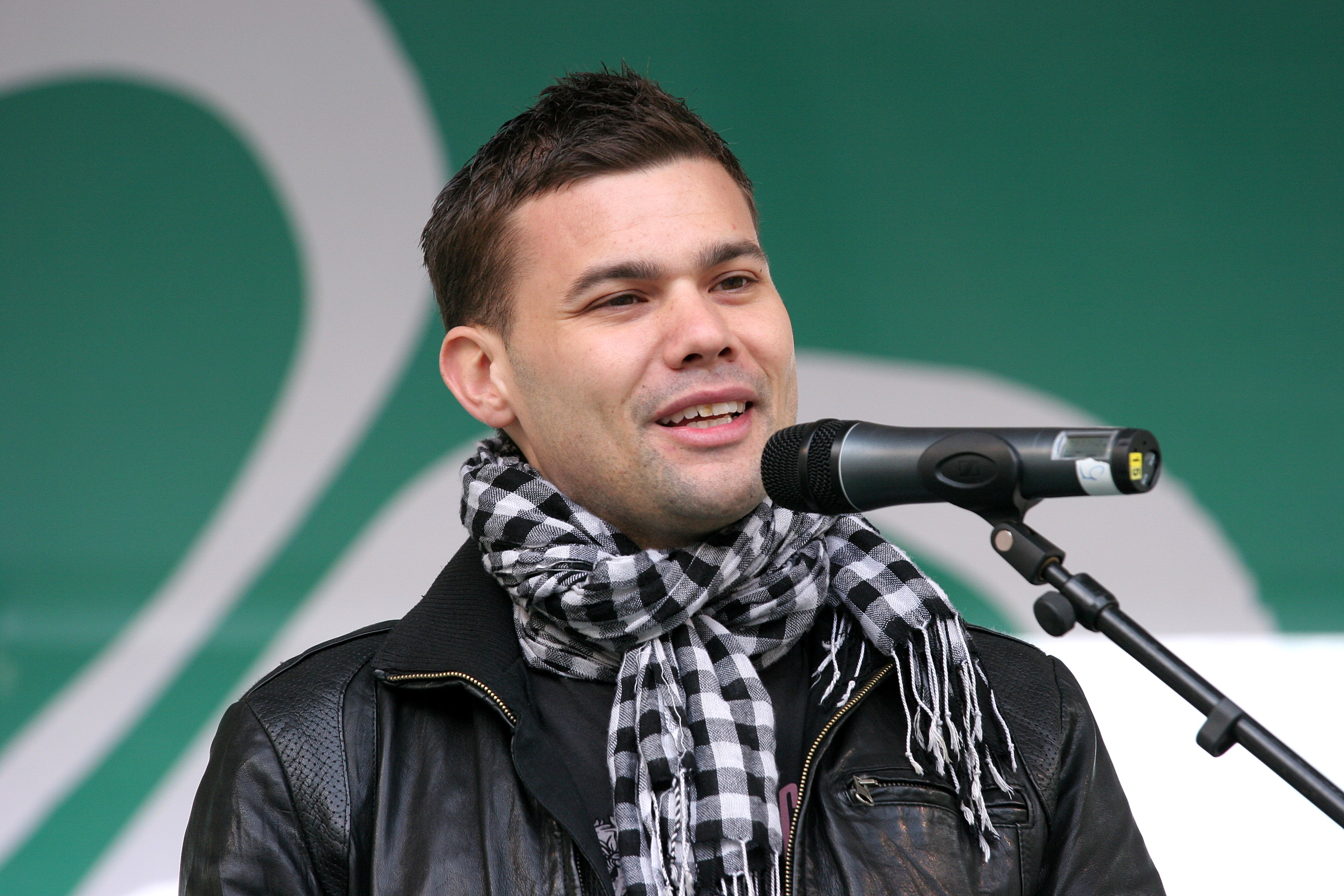
Policy spokesperson
Magnus Demervall

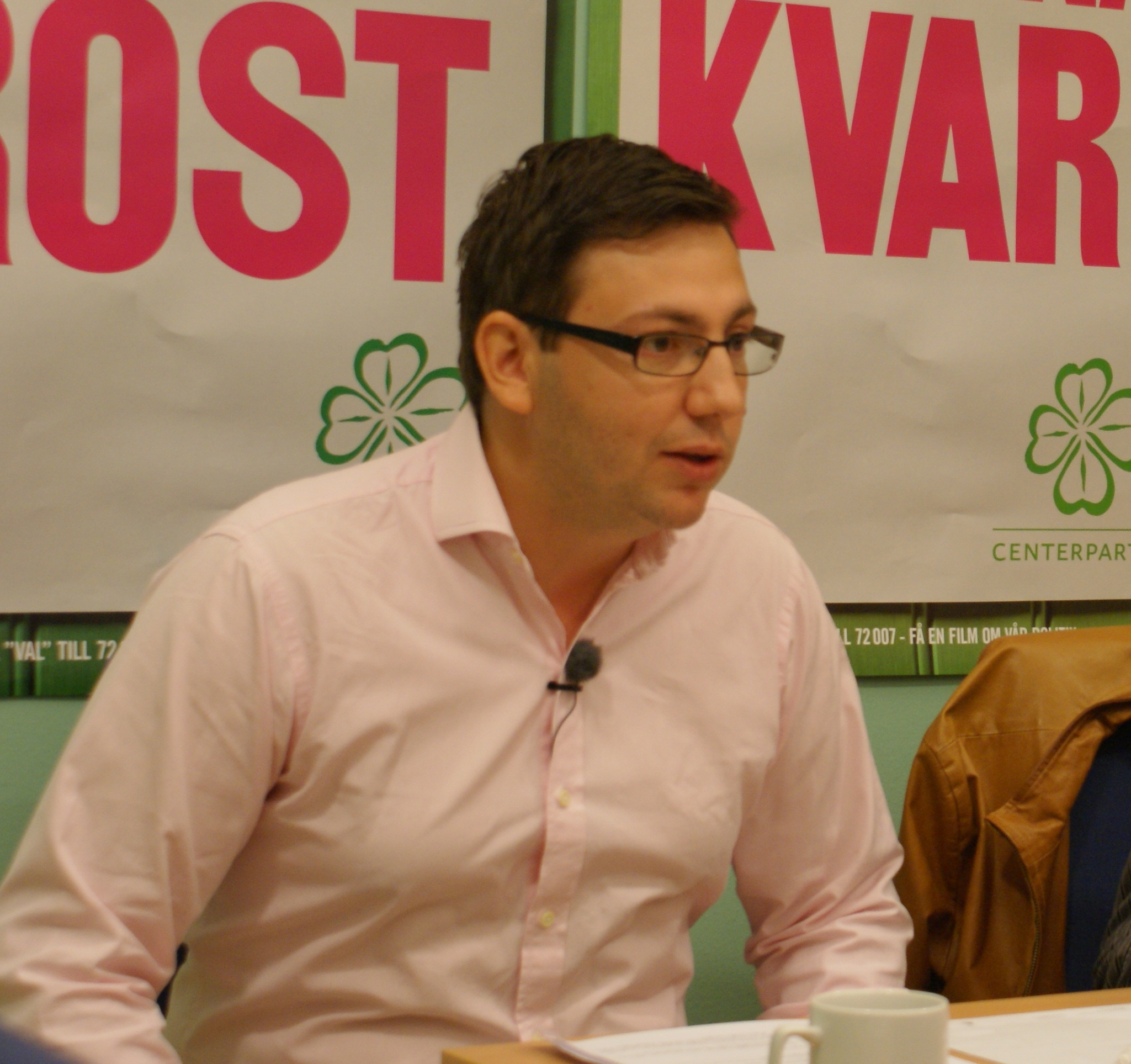
Education policy spokesperson
Muharrem Demirok

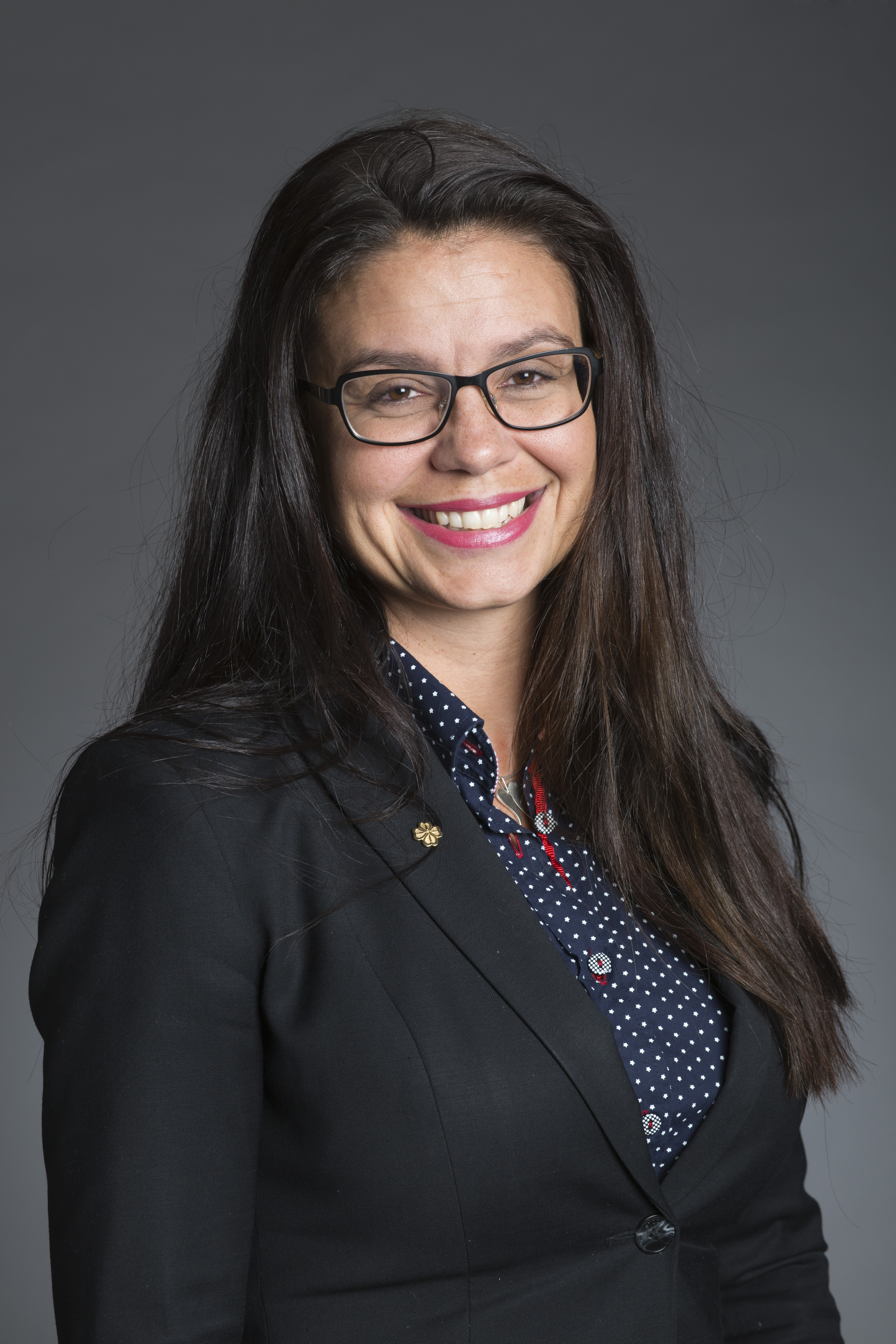
Tax policy spokesperson
Helena Lindahl

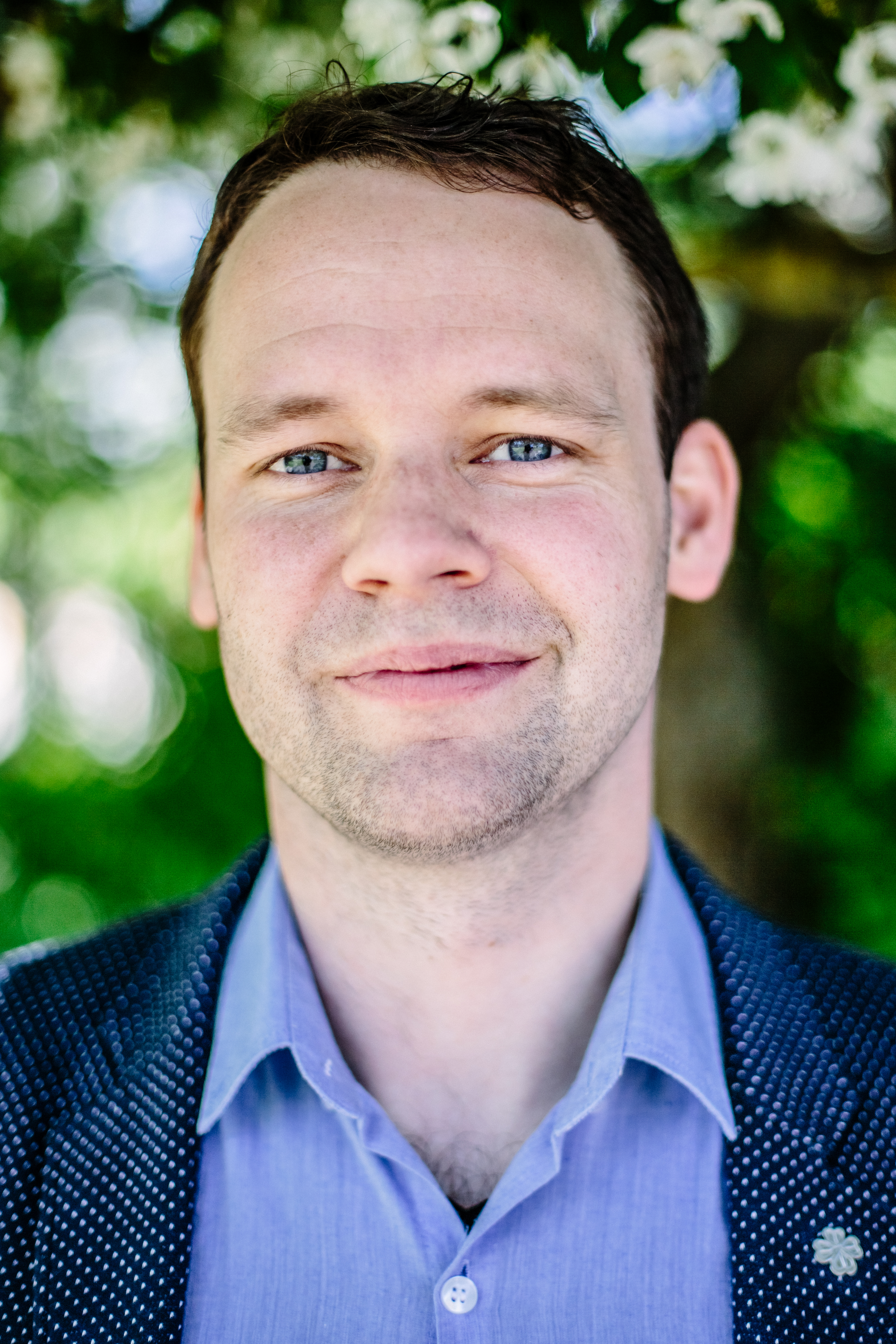
Climate and energy policy spokesperson
Rickard Nordin

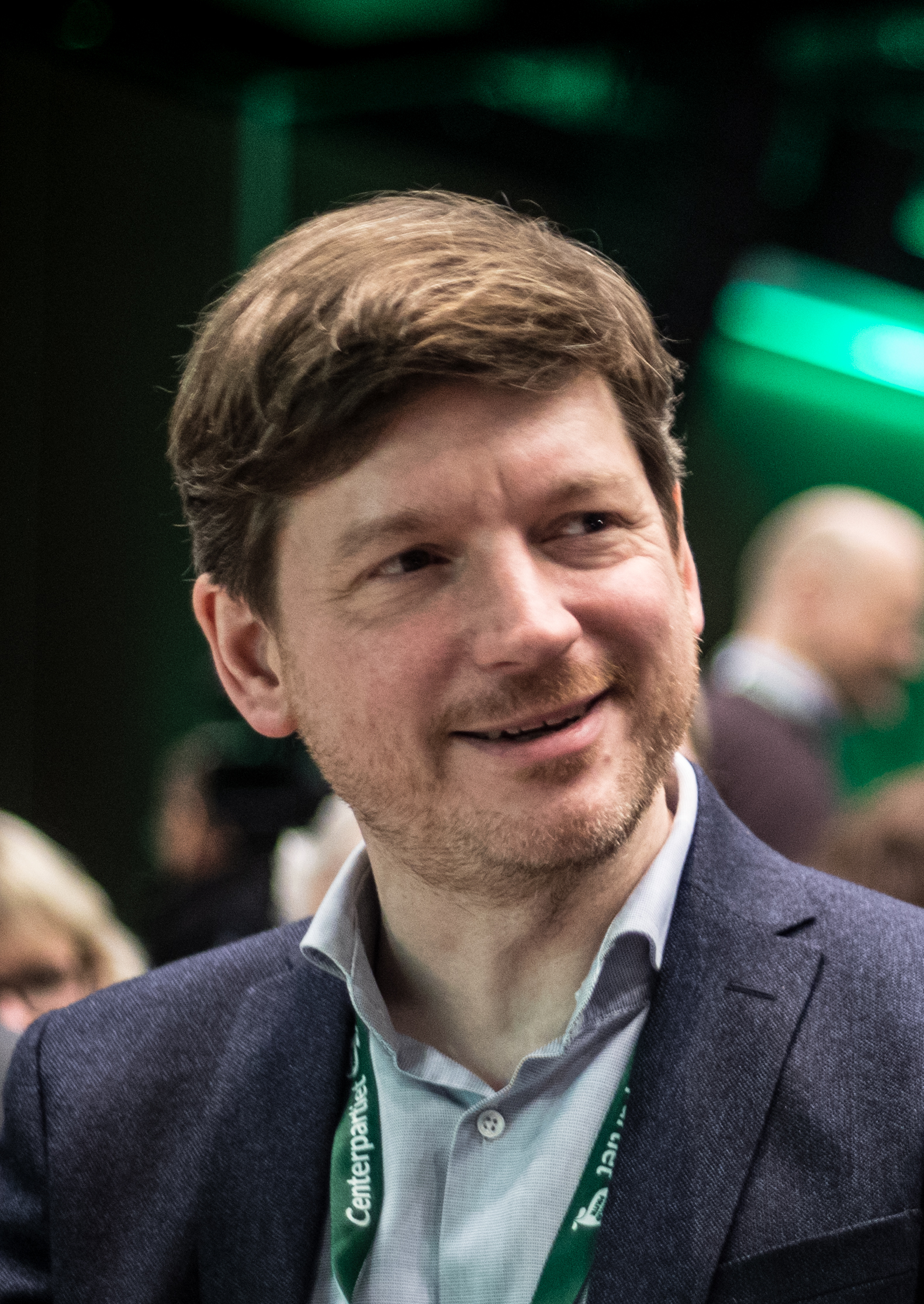
Economic-political spokesperson
Martin Ådahl
- Daniel Bäckström – Group leader of the Centre Party (2022–), spokesperson for rural politics (2021–), member of the Riksdag (2013, 2014–).
- Magnus Demervall – Centre Party's policy chief (2018–), municipal councilor in Solna Municipality (2010–2014), chairman of the Centre Party Youth (2007–2011).
- Muharrem Demirok – Member of the Riksdag (2022–), education policy spokesperson (2022–), municipal councilor in Linköping Municipality (2009–2022).
- Ulrika Liljeberg – Member of the Riksdag (2022–), legal policy spokesperson (2022–), chairman of the municipal board in Leksand municipality (2008–2022).
- Helena Lindahl – Member of the Riksdag (2010–), tax policy spokesperson (2022–).
- Rickard Nordin – Climate and energy policy spokesperson (2014–), member of the Riksdag (2011–).
- Martin Ådahl – Second vice-chairman (2021–), economic policy spokesperson (2021–), member of Sweden's Riksdag (2018–).

=== Refused to be candidates ===
- Magnus Ek – Member of the Riksdag (2018–2022), chairman of the Centre Party Youth (2015–2019).
- Anders W. Jonsson – Group leader of the Centre Party (2011–2022), first deputy chairman (2011–2021), member of the Riksdag (2010–). Party leader candidate 2011.
- Anna-Karin Hatt – CEO of the Federation of Swedish Farmers (2019–), Minister for Energy (2011–2014), Minister for Digital Development (2010–2014), Regional Minister (2010–2011), State Secretary at the Coordination Office (2006–2010), CEO of Almega (2015– 2019). Party leader candidate 2011.
- Emil Källström – CEO (acting) of SEKAB (2022–), economic policy spokesperson (2014–2021), member of the Riksdag (2010–2021).
- Linda Modig – First deputy chairman (2021–), member of the Riksdag (2018–2022).
- Elisabeth Thand Ringqvist – Member of the Riksdag (2022–), business policy spokesperson (2022–), CEO of Företagarna (2011–2015), chairman of the Centre Party's University Association (1997–1998).
- Hanna Wagenius – Chairman of the municipal council in Östersund Municipality (2018–), chairman of the Centre Party Youth (2011–2015). (Endorsed Emma Wiesner).
