= Prostitution in Sweden =

The laws on prostitution in Sweden make it illegal to buy sex, but not to sell the use of one's own body for such services. Procuring and operating a brothel remain illegal. The criminalisation of the purchase of sex, but not the selling of one's own body for sex, was unique when first enacted in Sweden in 1999. Since then, this "Nordic model" for sex trade legislation has been adopted in several other nations.

== History of prostitution in Sweden ==
=== Prior to the 18th-century ===
Prostitution is not mentioned in any law texts in Sweden in the Middle Ages, and was thus not formally a crime. However, under the influence of the church, sexual acts outside of marriage were criminalised for both sexes regardless of circumstances, which also affected prostitutes. The normal punishment for extramarital sexual relations was fines or (if the accused was unable to pay them) pillorying, whipping, or other disciplinarian physical punishments within the Kyrkoplikt. The ban on extramarital sex was the same in cases of actual prostitution: when the activity of the madam Sara Simonsdotter was exposed in the capital in 1618, she, her staff and clients were all sentenced to various punishments for fornication in accordance with the ban of extramarital sex.

=== Eighteenth century ===
The earliest law to explicitly ban prostitution was in the Civil Code of 1734, where procuring and brothel-keeping were punished with whipping, imprisonment and forced labor, and prostitution at a brothel with forced labor.

From 1724 onward, unmarried women in Stockholm with no certification asserting that they were supported by a legal profession, a personal fortune or by a sponsor guaranteeing their economic support, could be arrested for vagrancy and placed at the Långholmens spinnhus to prevent them from supporting themselves "indecently", which was frequently used against prostitutes. High-class courtesans, who met their clients at the theater or opera and received them in the client's home or their own, were protected from the police by a certificate of sponsorship by a client, or by having an official legal profession on paper, usually as an actress or singer.

There were no brothels in a formal sense in Stockholm or Sweden prior to 1839. During the 18th-century, the brothels, such as the famous elite brothel Platskans jungfrubur, were in actuality simply a temporary locale, often the home of a procuror, where the procuror arranged a meeting between a potential client and a prostitute, rather than a house where a group of prostitutes lived together and received clients on a permanent basis. There were also the famous horbal ("whore ball"), were procurers arranged a ball between several potential clients and prostitutes in a temporary local such as an inn: one such ball was arranged in a wing at the Stockholm Royal Palace in secrecy in the spring of 1768, when the royal court was absent, and caused a scandal when it was exposed.

In 18th-century Stockholm, there were concerns that coffee houses that were managed by women, financed by former rich lovers, were in fact masked brothels, as were often pubs and bars, where the waitresses were suspected to be prostitutes. These were often raided by the police, who occasionally forced the female staff to subject to physical examination to prevent the spread of sexual diseases, but this was done without the permission of any specific law.

=== Nineteenth century ===
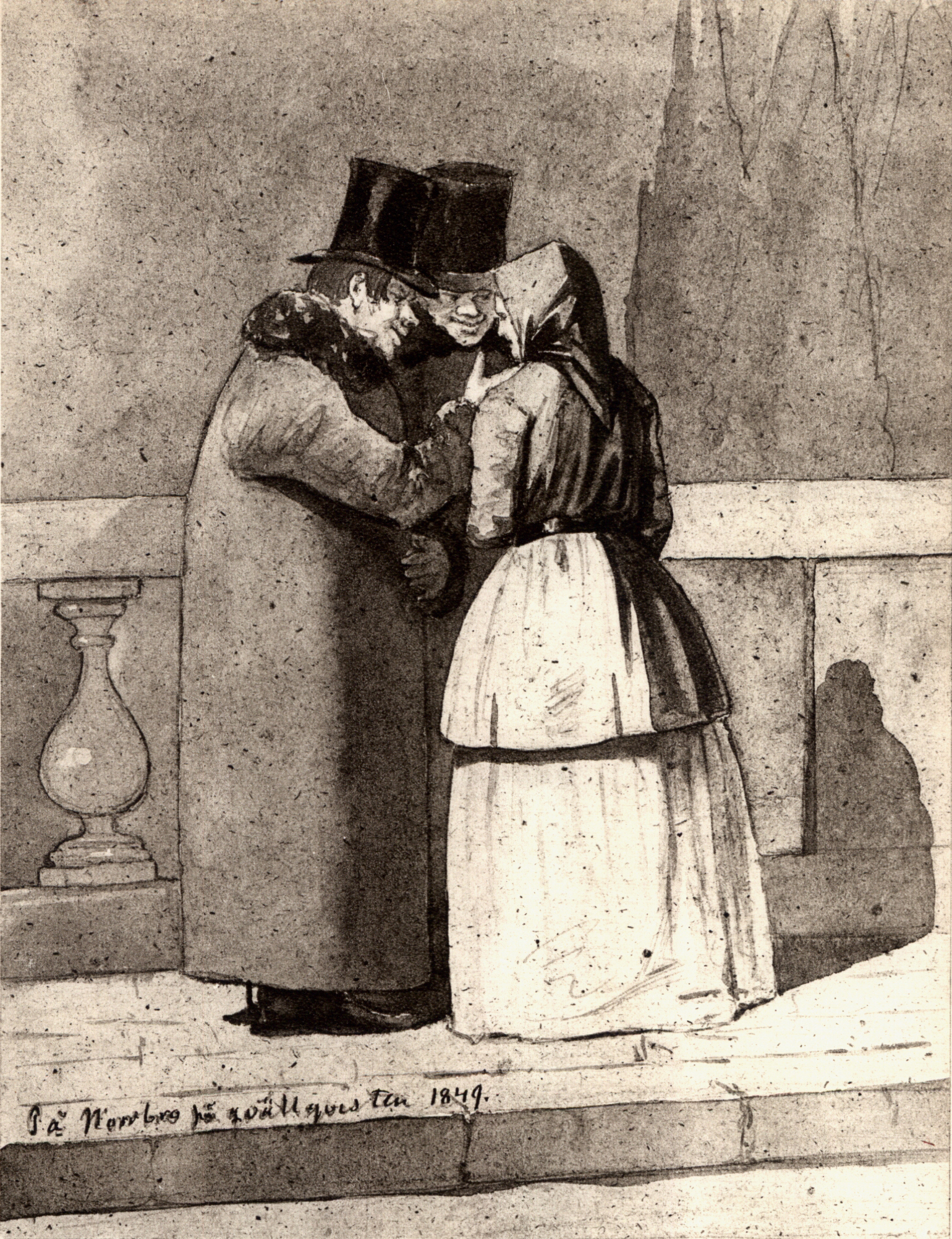
'På Norrbro på qvällsqvisten', Prostitution on the Norrbro in 1849.

In 1812, a law was introduced which allowed compulsory medical examination and treatment of anyone suspected of carrying a sexual disease, a law that was in practice mostly forced upon women in the capital suspected by the police of being prostitutes, which lead to protests of harassment. In common with many other European countries that practiced the Regulation system, Sweden delegated prostitution control to local authorities from 1833 onwards.

Between 1838 and 1841, an attempt was made by the local authorities in the capital of Stockholm to establish state control over prostitution, and thereby sexual diseases, through an experiment with private licensed brothels, London and Stadt Hamburg, but without success.

From 1847, most prostitution was illegal, but tolerated and regulated, including medical examinations and secure hospitals for venereal diseases. Brothels were also illegal, but persisted under police surveillance. Other regulations controlled areas frequented by prostitutes and the clothes that they could wear. This policy was both gendered and intrusive, typifying the "necessary evil" framing of prostitution typical of Western European discourse.

An abolitionist office, the Svenska Federationen, was established in Sweden in 1878, and eventually protests, including women's movements in the 1880s, and collaboration with the anti sex trafficking organization Vaksamhet, led to the commissioning of an inquiry in 1903, reporting in 1910. The resulting proposals met vigorous dissent from feminists and liberals, who succeeded in removing gendered prostitution clauses from the proposed legislation dealing with contagious disease.

=== Twentieth century ===
After 1918, control of prostitution was a national responsibility, under two laws, the Lex Veneris (1918), and the Vagrancy law (1885), dealing with disease and unemployment respectively, since money earned through prostitution was considered illegal. These were now gender-neutral in language, but, as elsewhere, not in practice, and the new vagrancy provisions were condemned as even more coercive by women. This was the Scandinavian Sonderweg (Special Way). Six official commissions considered the issues between 1923 and 1964. In practice, women charged under the vagrancy provisions were apprehended for prostitution in what was still coercive care as social control.

The three commissions of the 1920s (1923, 1926, 1929) depicted prostitution as a dangerous predisposition requiring correction, as opposed to mere detention, a moral analogue to the danger of spreading disease. The 1929 report presaged contemporary legislative developments by referring to public education and the role of demand. Women were divided, some calling for abolition of the law pointing out it was gendered in practice, and others supporting the then-popular social hygiene concept of sterilisation of the unfit. These discussions raised the idea that men who sought out sex workers were a danger to all women. Health professionals shifted from arguing about contagion to arguing morality.

This pathologised theory became the dominant discourse from the 1930s onwards for dealing with uncontrolled sexuality in a period which was characterised by social medicalisation. This was also an era associated with an attempt to eradicate venereal disease by mandatory tracing, treatment and consent to behavioural change (Lex Veneris). This formed part of a package of legislation that defined citizenship in terms of desired normative behaviour, including ‘honest labour’, a social welfare state based on the priority of the State over individual freedoms to promote the goals of folkhygien (public hygiene). Citizenship became a hierarchical attribute depending on adherence to these norms.

Throughout these discourses, care was taken to distinguish attitude, which required correction, from acts, which were punishable. A parallel discourse was the concern about population, and the 1935-1938 Population Commission commented on the need to control demand. It also raised the idea of prostitution as antisocial. The 1939 prostitution commission proposed criminalising prostitution-related activities as part of the fight against such a social evil, including the actions of clients, although for law and order reasons rather than moral. However, examining the language of this and a contemporary commission on homosexuality, it is clear that the construction remained heteronormative and patriarchal. The 1940s saw continued pressure for abolition of the increasingly obsolete vagrancy law, which was now being enforced in a more restrained manner. The 1960s brought the widespread questioning of sexual mores to Sweden, and, for the first time, the notion of prostitution as normative, together with proposals for re-establishing state brothels.

Debates in the Riksdag in 1950 saw women state that the primary cause of prostitution was male demand, echoing discourse outside of government in the 1880s and 1920s from the Nordic sexual morality debate. By 1958, women parliamentarians were stating that prostitution was the most important social problem of all time, demanding a further commission (1958-1962). By now, there was yet another reconceptualisation of prostitution, from psychopathology to sociopathology, and the resulting legislation replaced the vagrancy law with the antisocial behaviour law in 1964. Regulation of prostitution passed to this Act, but retained the concept of normative social citizenship based on honest labour. In practice, the law was used less and less, was successfully challenged in court in 1967, and was replaced in 1969 by the Social Services Act of 1980, till the Prohibition of Purchase of Sexual Services Act of 1999 (amended 2005).

== The gender equality debate and the Kvinnofrid law (1960– ) ==
Sweden has had an active debate on gender equality since the 1960s, and this has resulted in a number of institutional structures such as the Ministry of Equal Status (1976) and the Equal Opportunities Ombudsman (1980). A gendered recommendation on rape by a state commission on sexual offences in 1976 evoked a remarkable consensus within both the women's movement and the parliamentary women's groups that eventually led to the demand for further inquiries including yet another prostitution commission. The resulting inquiry in 1981 was very controversial (internally and externally), concluding that prostitution was not a question of gender equality. They found that prostitution was declining and recommended that criminalisation would merely drive it underground and worsen stigmatisation. Some attempt was made to distinguish between voluntary and involuntary prostitution. Amongst those opposing criminalisation were the police, judiciary and ombudsmen, gay rights groups and the Association for Sexuality Education. The battered women's shelter, and most women's political groups (except the conservatives), supported criminalising the client. The resultant bill (1982) only dealt with pornography but provided some funding for research on prostitution. However, the rhetoric was clear: Prostitution was still a social evil, and incompatible with equality, and should be fought.

Between 1983 and 1993 (particularly 1984–1987 and 1990–1992), some 50 bills were presented dealing with prostitution, many of which included the criminalisation of purchase, and there was a major lobby within and without the Riksdag from women's movements and calls for more commissions. A further commission was instigated in 1993 led by Inga-Britt Törnell, a former ombudsman. One bill from women parliamentarians at the time demanded immediate criminalisation of clients, believing there was sufficient "evidence", and that a further commission was not required.

1995 saw both the reports of this commission (SOU 1995: 15) and also one on violence against women and rape (SOU 1995: 60). The latter met the women's objectives, the former, however, proposed criminalising both parties to an exchange in prostitution, including both hetero and homosexual prostitution. In the ensuing public debate, there was talk of a historic reversal of patriarchy, and of the need to avoid further victimising the victims (women). There was virtually no support for the commission's recommendations in the ensuing consultation process, most commentators opposing any criminalisation. Bills from women parliamentarians criminalising clients continued to be presented, and the Government was criticised for inaction.

=== The Kvinnofrid law (1999) ===
The resulting government bill (5 February 1998) packaged both commission reports together as a Violence Against Women Act (Kvinnofrid), including criminalisation of purchase in the prostitution provisions and measures to combat sexual harassment in the workplace. It was sponsored by both the Prime Minister, Göran Persson, and the Minister for Gender Equality, Ulrika Messing. The Justice Committee was not convinced that criminalisation would reduce prostitution, but still recommended the bill. Yvonne Svanström (Department of Economic History, Stockholm University) describes the debates as being heavily gendered. Men tended to argue that this was a social, not criminal, matter, and that the bill intruded on self-determination, while the women argued that prostitution was incompatible with a social order embracing gender equality. They saw prostitution as patriarchal oppression, and therefore, not a free will choice, although there was less unanimity over what should be done. The uniqueness of the proposal was emphasised, all of which took place at an ideological level, with no appeal to empiricism, which was explicitly rejected. Eventually, the bill passed on 4 June 1998, by 181 to 92 in the 349-member Riksdag, becoming law on 1 January 1999. On 1 April 2005, this provision was transferred to the Penal Code as section 11 of a new sexual crimes chapter (6).

=== The debates: frames and actors ===
==== Political parties ====
Sweden has proportional representation and a multi-party system. Social Democrats dominated Swedish politics for most of the twentieth century, but formed a minority left-of-centre government during that time, with support from the Centre Party.

In the final vote, the Social Democrats, the Left Party, and the Greens supported the bill, while opposition to the proposals in the Riksdag was only moderate, the opposition parties believing that the bill would be passed anyway. The Moderate Party and Liberal People's Party opposed the policy, while the Christian Democrats abstained. The Liberal People's Party argued that prostitution would be merely pushed underground, while the Christian Democrats wanted both the sale and purchase of sex criminalised.

==== Gendering the debate ====
While maintaining that this was not about women's sexuality, the supporters of the bill claimed that women should control their own bodies, and that this was about men's access to women's bodies. Feminists and women's movements had carried out considerable lobbying for criminalising purchase, but in the end, it was the women's groups within the parliamentary parties that were responsible for the success of the legislation, crossing and even defying their own party lines. However, this was not as homogeneous as is sometimes perceived. Moderate women never joined the movement, and both Moderate and a number of Liberal women opposed the bill.

Most of the parliamentary debate was undertaken by women, which Ulrika Lorentzi, former editor of the feminist magazine Bang, referred to as the "Sex Wars". Women held 41% of the seats in parliament which, although the highest proportion in Europe, still meant they had to lobby for male support within their parties in order to get this passed. The women's movement had prostitution high on its agenda, criminalisation of purchase had been on that agenda for a hundred years, and there was little opposition to this. However, ensuing public debates revealed that even Swedish women were divided on the approach that had been taken.

For the women, this was a test case of their ability to come together as a caucus and push through a women's agenda over the wishes of male colleagues. Messing's agenda was expansive: "I believe that in 20 years, today's decision will be described as the big leap forward to fight violence against women and to reach Kvinnofrid."

==== Role of equality ====
In addition to the Ministry and Ombudsman, equality issues lay with the parliamentary Gender Equality Committee (1976), and a unit was created at the Department of Labour. Legislation was created in 1980. In this case, the women's agencies were seen as not being supportive of the women's movement which had become increasingly coalesced around the demand for criminalizing the client, but rather, pursuing equality in a more impartial mode. The Minister, however, essentially championed the proposal both inside and outside of the Riksdag, and therefore, it may be argued that women's political agencies played an indirect role through the profile of the office and minister.

==== Major discourses ====
Arguments as to action varied across a spectrum from no action, criminalising both partners, to criminalising the client. Opponents expressed concern that criminalisation would drive prostitution underground, and was symbolic rather than realistic. Other concerns were expressed about the state of legislation and practice in the rest of the EU, including a fear of contamination of Sweden, and that this would send a message to Europe against liberalisation. Other aspects of this included concerns about trafficking.

A term that appeared in the debates and has since become popularised is ‘Swedish Model’ or "Den Svenska Modellen", a term long used to describe foreigner's perception of the Swedish way of doing things, and in particular the paternalist welfare state that arose in the 1930s. Out of context, this has become the most commonly used term to describe criminalising purchase in subsequent debates around the world.

==== Official position ====
The Swedish Government states that the reason behind this legislation is the importance to society of fighting prostitution.

Prostitution is considered to cause serious harm both to individuals and to society as a whole. Large-scale crime, including human trafficking for sexual purposes, assault, procuring and drug-dealing, is also commonly associated with prostitution. (...)The vast majority of those in prostitution also have very difficult social circumstances.

The law is in accordance with Sweden's gender equality programme. Theoretically, the gender of the seller and buyer are immaterial under the law, that is it is gender-neutral. However, the law is politically constructed, discussed, and enforced in the context of women selling sex to men. The Swedish Government believes that women selling "sexual services" to men constitutes a form of violence against women which should be eliminated by reducing demand. Demand for women's sexual "services" is constructed as a form of male dominance over women, and as a practice which maintains patriarchal hegemony. (see Feminist views on prostitution). This legal and social approach to prostitution, which has become known as the "Swedish Model" or more recently the "Nordic Model", needs to be understood—at least partly—in the context of radical feminism (a philosophy which focuses on the theory of the patriarchal roots of inequality between men and women), which is very prominent in Sweden.

Today, the law is largely uncontroversial across the whole political spectrum, the view of prostitution as a legacy of a societal order that subordinates women to men being officially accepted. Consequently, it has become a taboo subject to question the legitimacy and effectiveness of the law, and those who have criticised the law have faced considerable opposition. Nevertheless, there is a body of criticism, within and without parliament, but this has had no measurable effect on the official position and party policy (see below).

=== Aftermath of Kvinnofrid law ===
Most of the debate, other than the lobbying from women's groups, took place within the parliament. Only after the law was passed did significant debate take place in public. "Sex as work" had been discussed during the 1990s, but was not part of the parliamentary debates, but started to be heard more in the public debates that followed. Petra Östergren, a PhD candidate and writer on sexuality, was a noted opponent, as were prostitution activists such as Lillian Andersson. Criticisms were made of women politicians on the grounds of class and for causing divisions between women (although they have framed the debate as being about men, not women). There was also interest in the fact that Sweden was quite unique in this regard.

Parliamentary activity continued, including the introduction of bills to criminalise the selling of sex, and to promote the Swedish approach and oppose liberalisation of laws on prostitution worldwide. In April 2005, the law was amended as part of a reform of sexual crimes to add the clause "That which is stated in the first section also applies if the payment has been promised or made by someone else" to include procurement by a third party, which was acknowledged as a loophole. Sexual acts with children were also added (section 9), and the Sex Purchase Law was moved to the Penal Code.

Following the passage of the law, the Government provided 7 million crowns ($1 million US) to the National Police Board for enforcement. Extra police were hired and vehicles in known areas of street work placed under surveillance. Ninety-one reports were filed in 1999, and a reduction in visible prostitution was noted while acknowledging that estimating the actual activity of prostitution was extremely difficult, and that it was quite possible it had merely gone underground. The difficulties of enforcement were immediately noted by the police who had opposed the law, and the difficulty in getting a conviction was even harder under Swedish judicial procedure and the rights of citizens. Few of the reports in 1999 were concluded. Six convictions were obtained, and fines imposed. Difficulties in even understanding the law were noted, and understandably prostitutes were reluctant to inform or testify against their clients. The Socialstyrelsen (National Board of Health and Welfare) noted that estimating the extent of prostitution was almost impossible. A number of reports suggest that prostitution was at a low level in Sweden, and was on the decline, but may have experienced a slight increase in the 1990s. As expected, there was an immediate decrease in the visible spectrum, as seen in other countries introducing repressive legislation (e. g., Street Offences Act 1959, U.K.) followed fairly rapidly by displacement to the less visible spectrum.

The historian Yvonne Svanström describes two similar cases, in which the outcome is very different for the man and the woman (a male judge and a woman police cadet), as exemplifying the fact that the law as a symbolic tool has done little if anything to achieve its intent of reversing patriarchal hegemony and reversing centuries of controlling women's sexuality to controlling that of men. She saw this as indicative of Eva Lundgren’s thesis of the divide between regulative systems and constitutive systems, and the relative stability of the latter.

==== Exporting the model ====
Swedish authorities and activists have promoted the "Swedish Model" internationally. The Government hosted conferences on trafficking, sexual violence, and prostitution as a comprehensive entity, and issued Fact Sheets outlining official Swedish policy in a variety of languages. These made the case that prostitution and trafficking were manifestations of the same male criminal predisposition, "male violence against women and children", who are described as victims. Alliances were formed with prohibitionist anti-trafficking groups such as the Coalition Against Trafficking in Women, and representations made at higher levels such as the European Union, Council of Europe and the United Nations. An approach of public anti-prostitution education was taken, through advertising and education, including schools programmes. Subsequently, the Swedish approach has found support amongst abolitionist groups around the world that lobby for similar legislation using Sweden as a model.

Several European countries have discussed, or are currently discussing, adopting a similar legal system. After a long debate, in 2009 similar laws were adopted by Norway and Iceland. In 2014, Canada introduced similar legislation, followed by Northern Ireland in 2015., France in 2016, the Republic of Ireland in 2017 and Israel in 2018. While some claim that South Korea introduced similar legislation in 2004, "all forms of sex work are criminalised" there. The Korean Act on the Punishment of Arrangement of Commercial Sex Acts, Etc. criminalises both the act of selling and the act of paying for sexual acts, defined as "sexual intercourse" and "pseudo-sexual intercourse using parts of the body, such as the mouth and anus, or implements". The law also criminalises the facilitation of commercial sex acts, regardless of coercion being involved.

=== Research on prostitution in Sweden ===
One often-cited Swedish historian on the subject of the Swedish law on prostitution is Yvonne Svanström (Stockholm). Some research into the law comes from outside of Sweden as well. In 2008, data appeared on a study of prostitution across the Nordic region by the Nordic Gender Institute (NIKK), including work done by several authors from the different Nordic countries (Denmark, Finland, Iceland, Norway, Sweden).

The number of sex workers working in Sweden before and after 1999 law reform has been described as "difficult to determine" by Skilbrei. In Skilbrei and Holmström's critical review of the data and reports that have been published, they note that knowledge concerning the size of the market before the ban was primarily based on whom the social workers came into contact with. They conclude that there is "no reason to assume that these represent the market in its entirety." The impacts of the law must also be considered with regard to the way sex workers interact with social workers before and after the ban.

Some have argued that the most visible effect of the Swedish law, according to the data presented, seemed to be that since the law came into effect, fewer men reported purchasing sex and prostitutes were less visible. However, the data on men reporting purchasing sex has been called into question for a number of reasons. Firstly, multiple researchers have questioned the influence of legislative change, and the shift from a non-criminal to criminal act being the subject of the question. When any behaviour or act is criminalised there is generally much less self-reporting of it, especially when the interview is not anonymised (as was the case in the data here). Secondly, the most frequently cited data on the decrease in reported purchase of sex by men in Sweden is a question based on lifetime purchases of sex. Given how closely the two surveys were conducted (less than a decade apart), it was found to be statistically impossible for the number to drop so significantly. That is, people can't reverse back to a state of never having bought sex when so many had, just a few years earlier prior to the act becoming criminalised.

Despite organisations like the Global Network of Sex Work Projects (NSWP) warning to proceed with extreme caution regarding mapping and population estimates of sex workers, a number of Swedish Model supporters remain enthusiastic quoters of such statistics (even though they are also highly unreliable for numerous reasons). NSWP caution against such approaches, citing a lack of beneficial outcomes from counting sex workers, while also pointing out that these “studies” involve a number of inherent risks to the rights and well-being of sex workers and their families, especially in countries like Sweden which have such hostile laws that threaten sex workers' custody over their children and threaten deportation of migrant workers even from the EU.

Social workers reported a gradual decline in involvement over a ten-year period and more use of technology. It was unclear how much of this change could be attributed to the law itself. The 1995 Swedish government commission (SOU 1995:15) had estimated that there were 2500-3000 women in prostitution in Sweden, among whom 650 were on the streets. In contrast, in the 2008 NIKK report, estimates show there are approximately 300 women in street prostitution, and 300 women and 50 men who used the internet (indoor prostitution).

In Norway, with 4.9 million people, it was estimated that there were 2654 women, of whom 1157 were on the street in 2007 (among those not on the street in Norway, the numbers were based on those who sought support from social agencies, or whose advertisements were found on the internet or in a paper), which is over 4 times compared to Sweden's numbers, and over 8 times more per capita. Furthermore, the number of men reporting the experience of purchasing sex in the national Swedish population samples seems to have dropped from 12.7% to 7.6% from 1996 to 2008. No respondents in the latest survey published in 2008 reported they increased, or that they started purchasing sex outside of Sweden, nor changed into purchasing sex in "non-physical" forms. This 2008 survey, which obtained responses from 2500 men and women between 18 and 74, is now also published in English.

=== Evaluation of the Kvinnofrid law ===
==== Initial efforts ====
Evaluation of the law creates considerable conceptual burdens, especially given the expansionist claims of the rationale and objectives, which include not only the eradication of prostitution, but also of violence against women, and a cultural shift in sexuality values. Even before the introduction of this law, Sweden had less prostitution than other European countries. Supporters of the law maintain that it has had the effect of decreasing trafficking and pimping. Critics claim that there has been an increase in hidden prostitution, especially internet prostitution. However, the research published by NIKK (see above) does not suggest that hidden- or internet prostitution is a comparably larger proportion in Sweden than in Denmark or Norway.

===== Socialstyrelsen (National Board of Health and Welfare) =====
Monitoring and evaluation of the law was delegated to the Socialstyrelsen, which has produced three reports (2000, 2004, 2007). These acknowledged the difficulties in evaluating the situation and provided no hard evidence that the law had in any way achieved its objectives. The 2007 report states that street prostitution is on the increase after an initial decline and that customers and prostitutes now use the internet and mobile phone to communicate.

The issue of unintended consequences was raised by critics of the proposed legislation in Sweden in 1996 three years before it took place, namely that it would drive women in prostitution underground, increase the risk of violence, harm the most vulnerable, and be almost impossible to enforce, which some claim has happened. However, the 2003 report stated that one "cannot state with certainty whether there has been an increase of violence [in prostitution]... Some informants speak of greater risks ... few have observed an actual increase ... Police who have studied the occurrence of violence have not found any evidence of an increase... The interview data and other research indicate that violence and prostitution are closely linked, whatever sort of legislation may be in effect." This assessment was not modified in the later follow-up report by the Board in 2007. A 2001 police report contradicted this (see below).

Some observers have noted that practitioners have left Sweden in order to ply their trade elsewhere, Africa being one destination.

===== Police and media reports =====
In 2001, the Malmö police reported that there was no evidence that the law had reduced violence; rather, there was evidence it had increased,

In 2007, Der Spiegel, a German news magazine, stated that according to the Swedish police, 400 to 600 foreign women are brought to Sweden each year to be prostitutes. In Finland, which is only half the size of Sweden, that number is between 10,000 and 15,000 women. That same year, Jonas Trolle, an inspector with a unit of the Stockholm police dedicated to combating the sex trade, was quoted as saying, "We only have between 105 and 130 women, both on the Internet and on the street, active (in prostitution) in Stockholm today".

In 2008, Kajsa Wahlberg, of the human trafficking unit at Sweden's national police board, conceded that accurate statistics are hard to obtain, but estimated that the number of prostitutes in Sweden dropped 40% from 2,500 in 1998 to 1,500 in 2003. However, by 2010, she had conceded that the policy had failed, and that issues around prostitution were increasing, as noted in the media which carried out surveys on the street. In Stockholm, police sources reported increased activity on Malmskillnadsgatan in the city centre (which with Artillerigatan in the Östermalm district was a traditional site for street prostitution in Stockholm). Judges and senior police officials have been caught purchasing sex, while most recently, the Minister of Labour, Sven Otto Littorin, was also accused of purchasing sex (Littoringate).

===== Government action =====
Amongst other concerns about the law, taxing the proceeds of prostitution (recognised since 1982) is raising questions as to the rationality of a law prohibiting purchase. On 10 July 2008, the Government announced a new Action Plan on prostitution including the investment of another 200 million kroner, action at an international level and further educational measures to ‘help them [people] rethink their attitudes’. Stories about prostitution appear almost daily in the media, often with commentary from Gender Equality officials. The increasing emphasis on the symbolic nature of the law, ‘sending a message’, by the authorities also sends a message that the instrumental value is in doubt.

==== Public opinion ====
Opinion polls have shown high public support. Polls conducted by the opinion and social research consultancy, SIFO, in 1999, and again two years later, showed a rise - from 76% to 81% - in the number of people who favoured this law. The percentage of respondents who wanted the law to be repealed was 15% in 1999, and 14% two years later. The rest "didn't know". In the 2008 survey conducted by NIKK (see above), 71% of Swedes said they supported the ban on paying for sex, although only 20% of respondents believed that the number of people who pay for sex had been reduced. 79% of women and 60% of men favored the law. The young adult population (18-38), particularly women, were most in favor of the law.

A 2005 sex survey conducted online by Durex has shown that out of the 34 countries surveyed, Sweden had the lowest percentage of respondents who had paid for sex (3% of those who answered the question. Respondents included both men and women). The methodology has been criticised.

A 2010 survey by Järfälla tjejjour found that 25% of Swedish men were in favour of repealing the law, compared with 7% of women.

In 2023, a survey conducted by Novus found that 91% of Swedish women thought it should be illegal to purchase sex, compared with 63% of men.

==== Skarhed commission and report (Ban on purchase of sexual services: An evaluation 1999-2008) 2010 ====
In 2008, the Swedish government appointed Supreme Court Justice and later Justice Chancellor (Justitiekanslern), Anna Skarhed, to lead an official inquiry into the effects that the purchase law has had on prostitution and human trafficking in Sweden. This evaluation attracted great interest internationally. But Susanne Dodillet, an academic at University of Gothenburg and author of Är sex arbete? (Is Sex Work?), was sceptical that the review would add much to what we know. She criticised the fact that the report, regardless of its results, would not be allowed to suggest repeal of the law.

One group of scholars, politicians, and NGOs made a submission to the Commission on 17 March 2008, arguing that the Government should provide a civil rights remedy to people in prostitution in order to support their exiting the trade. Their submission stated that the judiciary were misinterpreting the law, and that this should be recognised and corrected. In support of this, they cited a 2001 case in which it was held that the law did not provide a woman with a civil right to damage awards from a purchaser in a sexual transaction. Among this group of thirteen petitioners, were the Swedish Association of Women's Shelters and Young Women's Empowerment Centres (one of the two national umbrella shelter-organisations), the Social Democrat's Women's Federation (S-Kvinnor), and the immigrant-oriented women's shelter Terrafem.

===== Report =====
The final report of the commission was submitted to Justice Minister Beatrice Ask in July 2010. The report stated that the law worked, and had achieved its objectives, but suggested that the sentence for purchasing sex be doubled. It stated that since the introduction of the ban on buying sex, street prostitution had been halved, and that: "This reduction may be considered to be a direct result of the criminalisation of sex purchases."

It was also found that there had been no overall increase in prostitution in Sweden. "People working in the field do not consider that there has been an increase in prostitution since the ban was introduced." It also stated that the law has had a positive effect on human trafficking. "According to the National Criminal Police, it is clear that the ban on the purchase of sexual services acts as a barrier to human traffickers and procurers considering establishing themselves in Sweden."

The report also acknowledged Internet (indoor) prostitution as an expanding market, which is more difficult to study and verify than street prostitution, and which, in the last five years, has increased in Sweden, Norway, and Denmark; however, it stated, concurring with the NIKK report (above), that "the scale of this form of prostitution is more extensive in our neighbouring countries, and there is nothing to indicate that a greater increase in prostitution over the Internet has occurred in Sweden than in these comparable countries.

This indicates that the ban has not led to street prostitution in Sweden shifting arenas to the Internet." It also stated that there was no evidence of an increase of abuse towards the prostitutes and of worse living conditions for prostitutes. "As far as we can judge from the written material, and the contacts we have had with public officials and people involved in prostitution, these fears have not been realised", concurring with the Board of Welfare assessment (above) that persons in prostitution are not worse off as an effect of the law.

It was also noted that there were many limitations to evaluating the situation of prostitution in Sweden, due to the nature of prostitution and trafficking which are "complex and multifaceted social phenomena which partly occur in secret" and the fact that many empirical surveys had limited scope, and different methodologies and purposes.

Sweden's position on prostitution was re-affirmed: "Those who defend prostitution argue that it is possible to differentiate between voluntary and non-voluntary prostitution, that adults should have the right to freely sell and freely purchase sex (...) However, based on a gender equality and human rights perspective, (...) the distinction between voluntary and non-voluntary prostitution is not relevant." The report also addressed the suggestion of civil remedy, stating that the "person exploited in prostitution may normally be considered the injured party", implying a civil right to damages under the law.

===== Initial responses to report =====
The report was sent to the consultation process, where interested groups were provided with the opportunity to comment on it (see below). Release of the report attracted many initial commentaries in both English and Swedish. The Swedish media originally reported this in a largely factual manner, with two exceptions, one positive, and one critical. Commentaries have largely focussed on the ideological and political background. The law's supporters see the report as affirmation, while critics complain it adds nothing since it is not based on empirical research. They have commented on the lack of methodology and evidence and the failure to adequately consult with prostitutes themselves and have questioned the scientific validity. They have also raised the question as to whether it should be translated into English (only a summary is available) to allow a wider examination.

At the time of the release of the report, the Littoringate affair (see above) was occupying the media, leading people to question the law's purpose and underlying rationale when even government ministers were ignoring it. For instance, lawyer Alice Teodorescu wrote in Aftonbladet that Sweden has double standards in morality, while Isabelle Ståhl, on Sveriges Television, questioned the underlying victimisation theory, and Elisabet Höglund in Aftonbladet suggested the law be scrapped, calling it one of the weirdest laws in Swedish history and legally implausible because of its asymmetry. Such open challenging of the law has been unusual in the last 10 years since it was passed. However, the debate continues to be very divisive. Other criticism came from Paulina Neuding, editor of Neo. Some of the debate raised the broader question of state paternalism versus individual choice, and whether there should even be moral laws (Morallagar), given the pending Swedish elections on 19 September 2010.

One of the conclusions rests on comparisons between Sweden and surrounding Nordic countries (see NIKK study above). Some have considered the numbers on street prostitution in Denmark to be over reported, based on a report from the Danish prostitutes' organisation Sexarbejdernes Interesse Organisation (SIO). SIO stated that street prostitution in Copenhagen was overestimated by 1000 persons, attributing over reporting to an NGO, Reden, that works with women in prostitution, and the numbers of women that they had seen. Other data suggests that any over reporting would not be as large and even if so the number of persons in prostitution in total is many times larger in Denmark than in Sweden and Danish numbers on indoor prostitution were estimated at 3278. These numbers were mainly based on advertising, not Reden. Assuming 1415 is the number for outdoor prostitution in Denmark, that only amounts to a fourth of prostitution in Denmark. Therefore, it seems unlikely that street prostitution could be so significantly lower as SIO claims. However, whatever the numbers, the scientific question is whether this has anything to do with the sex purchase law or, rather, reflects historical patterns and cultural attitudes.

Two researchers stated that they had evidence, based on cross-national data, that the Swedish ban was an effective counter-trafficking tool, but this was criticised on methodological grounds by commentators.

The debate moved to the political arena when a government member of parliament, Camilla Lindberg (Liberal) (Dalarna) and Opposition member Marianne Berg (Left) (Malmö) published a bi-partisan article in Expressen, stating that the law did not protect women, but rather, hurt them, by reinforcing patriarchal attitudes towards women's control of their sexuality. Berg was criticised within her own party by Karin Rågsjö in a party newsletter. Criticism also came from Gudrun Schyman of Feministiskt initiativ, and in an editorial in Linberg's own constituency. This was then followed by a joint manifesto from parliamentary candidates of five political parties, including Helena von Schantz (Liberal) and Hanna Wagenius (Centre), attacking the evaluation process and report as "immoral". The Pirate Party had no official position on the law, but stands for basic freedoms, and party members have unofficially opposed it, and the party published a very liberal manifesto for the 2010 election. A Christian Democrat feminist, Sofie Jakobsson, has also supported re-opening brothels, but, as with other critics of the Swedish approach, did not find much support within her party.

==== Commentary, Analysis and Criticism of Evaluation ====
In the United Kingdom, one supporter of the Swedish approach, Julie Bindel, stated that she hoped that the evaluation would put an end to the claims that the sex-purchase law had been detrimental. She also wrote that, "No doubt, critics of this law will soon be arguing that the research that formed the basis of this evaluation is flawed and biased".

A researcher who conducted fieldwork in Sweden over four years with sex workers, Dr Jay Levy, conversely notes the 'critical' evaluation was mandated not to actually criticise the law, and so was biased from the outset: "any possible evidence pointing to a failure of the 1999 legislation was deliberately sidelined in the report’s directive. This specified that irrespective of the report’s findings, the sexköpslagen should not be questioned or critiqued, since a “starting point for our work has been that the purchase of sexual services is still to be criminalized“ [...] That the evaluation purports to be a critical evaluation thus appears to be a contradiction in terms. However, as the report functions for all intents and purposes only to affirm the success of the sexköpslagen, it may be (erroneously) held by some who are invested in the success of the sex purchase law to be indicative of its positive outcomes". Levy quotes several interviewees' respondents to the report, with a Senior Advisor Regarding Prostitution for the Swedish National Board of Health and Welfare noting that: “it’s extremely poor, and it’s full of contradictions and inconsistencies [...] [the report] does specifically specify that the starting point is that the sex purchase law should remain. If that’s the starting point, then how can you expect a report to not be biased?… of course that’s another way of saying that, no matter what you find doing this work, should there be, you know, extreme violations of human rights of sex workers… it does not matter, the law should remain”.

In Queensland, Australia, the state government body responsible for regulating prostitution, the PLA, issued its own critique of the Skarhed Report, describing it as rhetoric that was not substantiated by evidence.

===== Consultation process =====
52 remissvar (responses) were received. While many were favourable, those from academic sources, such as the Department of Criminology at Stockholm University were very critical. Two Swedish researchers, Petra Östergren and Susanne Dodillet, analysed the responses and compared them to the official report and found major contradictions. Their study concluded that there was no evidence to support the official claims.

===== Legislative response =====
The Swedish Government announced that it intended to increase the penalty for purchasing sex from six months to one year's imprisonment, effective 1 July 2011. The proposal was debated and passed on 12 May 2011, with a vote of 282 for and 1 against. The sole opponent was Federley; however, he claimed that attempts were made to prevent him from speaking against the proposal by the Centre Party.

== Continuing political and public debate ==
=== After passage of purchase law (1998) ===
Although the political scene had changed by 2005, the parties that had voted against the sex purchase law in 1998, and were now in power, no longer opposed it, and it became a non-partisan issue, although individual politicians still questioned the wisdom of the policy.

On 3 May 2009, Hanna Wagenius of the Centre Party Youth introduced a motion to repeal the sex purchase law, arguing that it did not help women involved in prostitution and that trafficking had actually increased since the law came into effect. The motion was passed 56: 39. In October 2009, Centre Party MP Fredrick Federley introduced a motion for repeal of the law. He also wrote a commentary in the 9 October Aftonbladet, explaining this - Avskaffa sexköpslagen! (Abolish the Sex Purchase Law!).

In May 2010, the law was criticised by Swedish MP Camilla Lindberg (Dalarna, Liberal) in an interview with Dalarnas Tidningar, who favoured a regulated system.

=== After publication of the evaluation (2010) ===
The law continues to remain controversial in Sweden, with regular debates in the media. On 30 January 2011, writing in Newsmill, Helena von Schantz challenged the Liberal party leadership as to why it supported the lengthening of sentences for buying sex. These penalties came into force on 1 July 2011.

In 2011, a research paper on the consequences of the Swedish legislation to sex workers concluded that the realisation of the desired outcomes of the legislation is hard to measure, whereas the law has stigmatised the already vulnerable sex workers. In April 2012 the Program on Human Trafficking and Forced Labor issued a report on the effects of the law, concluding that it had failed in its purpose. In July 2012, a report by the UN-backed Global Commission on HIV and the Law recommended all countries to decriminalise "private and consensual adult sexual behaviours", including same-sex sexual acts and "voluntary sex work". It specifically pointed out that this also applies to the Swedish model, claiming it has actually resulted in consequences for the sex workers, even though reported as a success to the public. Further criticism has come from the Network of Sex Work Projects.

=== Criminalising the Purchase of Sex: Lessons from Sweden (Levy 2015) ===
An academic book by researcher Dr Jay Levy was published in 2015, and addresses the outcomes of the criminalisation of the purchase of sex in Sweden. The book is informed by fieldwork and interviews undertaken with sex workers in Sweden between 2008 and 2012, and also includes interviews with policy makers, politicians, police and social workers. Levy emphasises that the sex purchase law has resulted in numerous harms associated with sex work, and has not been demonstrated to decrease levels of sex work, as it sets out to. It concludes: "Harms associated with sex work have been shown to be increased through repression and criminalisation. This is the case internationally, and it is specifically true for Swedish abolitionism. Redefined social constructions and dominant discourse have sent signals to broader Swedish society, with the abolitionist feminist discourse that frames the sex purchase law coming to inform prejudice and stigma, feeding detrimentally into service and healthcare provision, police attitudes, as well as opposition to harm reduction. Furthermore, law and policy have resulted in sex work in Sweden becoming increasingly dangerous and difficult for some, notably the most vulnerable sex workers and those working on the street. To all of these escalated harms caused/exacerbated by Swedish legislation, policy, and discourse must be added the sexköpslagen’s failure to diminish levels of prostitution. In short, the law has failed to achieve its objective of demonstrably reducing levels of sex work and in addition there is evidence the law and its justificatory discourse have caused significant harm to sex workers; Swedish efforts to export the criminalisation of the purchase of sex are based on the unfounded assertion that it has been successful and has not been detrimental."

== Current legal status ==
=== Purchasing sex (Brottsbalk 6.11) ===
Sweden's Sex Purchase Act (Swedish: Sexköpslagen), enacted in 1999, makes it illegal to purchase "sexual services" (sexuell tjänst), but not to sell them. The rationale for criminalising the purchaser, but not the seller, was stated in the 1997 government proposition, namely that "...it is unreasonable to also criminalise the one who, at least in most cases, is the weaker party who is exploited by others who want to satisfy their own sexual desires".

The Act (amended to be part of the Criminal Code, or Brottsbalk in 2005) states:

6.11 Den som, i annat fall än som avses förut i detta kapitel, skaffar sig en tillfällig sexuell förbindelse mot ersättning, döms för köp av sexuell tjänst till böter eller fängelse i högst sex månader.

Vad som sägs i första stycket gäller även om ersättningen har utlovats eller getts av någon annan. Lag (2005:90).

6.11 A person who, otherwise than as previously provided in this Chapter [on Sexual Crimes], obtains a casual sexual relation in return for payment, shall be sentenced for purchase of a sexual service to a fine or imprisonment for at most six months.

The provision of the first paragraph also applies if the payment was promised or given by another person.

In February 2014, the members of the European Parliament voted in a non-binding resolution (adopted by 343 votes to 139; with 105 abstentions), in favor of applying the Swedish model of criminalizing the buying of sex across the European Union.

==== Enforcement of law ====
In 2008, the number of police reports was 1,500, with 86 convictions in 2006. A Supreme court ruling has prevented the optional jail term being applied, and some parliamentarians have called for a minimum one-year jail term. To date, nobody has been imprisoned, according to Swedish Public Radio. A number of sources suggest that the law is not being enforced very strictly. Figures released in July 2010, suggest a large increase in the number of men reported for paying for sex, which was attributed to increased police activity. The number of convictions was not reported.

=== Third party activities (Brottsbalk 6.12) ===
Prior to the sex purchase law, third party activities were already criminalised under the Criminal Code, as 6.12, so that the 1999 law increased the sanctions directed against sexual exchange.

6.12 Den som främjar eller på ett otillbörligt sätt ekonomiskt utnyttjar att en person har tillfälliga sexuella förbindelser mot ersättning, döms för koppleri till fängelse i högst fyra år.

Om en person som med nyttjanderätt har upplåtit en lägenhet får veta att lägenheten helt eller till väsentlig del används för tillfälliga sexuella förbindelser mot ersättning och inte gör vad som skäligen kan begäras för att få upplåtelsen att upphöra, skall han eller hon, om verksamheten fortsätter eller återupptas i lägenheten, anses ha främjat verksamheten och dömas till ansvar enligt första stycket.

Är brott som avses i första eller andra stycket att anse som grovt, döms för grovt koppleri till fängelse i lägst två och högst åtta år. Vid bedömande av om brottet är grovt skall särskilt beaktas om brottet avsett en verksamhet som bedrivits i större omfattning, medfört betydande vinning eller inneburit ett hänsynslöst utnyttjande av annan. Lag (2005:90).

6.12 A person who promotes or improperly financially exploits a person’s engagement in casual sexual relations in return for payment shall be sentenced for procuring to imprisonment for at most four years.

If a person who, holding the right to the use of premises, has granted the right to use them to another, subsequently learns that the premises are wholly or to a substantial extent used for casual sexual relations in return for payment and omits to do what can reasonably be requested to terminate the granted right, he or she shall, if the activity continues or is resumed at the premises, be considered to have promoted the activity and shall be held criminally liable pursuant to the first paragraph.

If a crime provided for in the first or second paragraph is considered gross, imprisonment for at least two and at most eight years shall be imposed for gross procuring. In assessing whether the crime is gross, special consideration shall be given to whether the crime has concerned a large-scale activity, brought significant financial gain or involved ruthless exploitation of another person.

== Sex trafficking ==
Sweden is a destination and, to a lesser extent, source and transit country for women and children subjected to sex trafficking. Sex trafficking victims largely originate from Eastern Europe, Africa, East Asia, and the Middle East, though Swedish women and girls are vulnerable to sex trafficking within the country. Roma, primarily from Romania and Bulgaria, are vulnerable to sex trafficking. Most traffickers are the same nationality as their victims and are often part of criminal networks engaged in multiple criminal activities, although an increasing number of reported cases involve traffickers who are family members or have no ties to organised crime. Street children in Sweden, especially boys from Morocco, are vulnerable to child sex trafficking and forced criminality. Approximately 4,000 to 5,000 Swedes commit child sex tourism offenses abroad annually, primarily in Asia.

The United States Department of State Office to Monitor and Combat Trafficking in Persons ranks Sweden as a 'Tier 1' country.

=== Statistics ===
Sex trafficking statistics for Sweden from the US Department of State Office to Monitor and Combat Trafficking in Persons annual reports which are based on figures from the Swedish government and judiciary.

	2006	2007	2008	2009	2010	2011	2012	2013	2014	2015	2016	2017
Total sex trafficking cases investigated			15	31	32	35	21	40	31	58	82	82
Child sex trafficking cases investigated							9			11	16	23
No of victims identified			15	31	32	66	21	40	31	58	82	82
No of individuals prosecuted	21	13	9	24					1	2	3	3
No of individuals convicted	21	13	8	24	21				1	2	2	3

== See also ==
- Susanne Dodillet
- Petra Östergren
- Gunilla Ekberg
- Janice Raymond
- Yvonne Svanström
- History of Sweden
- Crime in Sweden

== Other sources ==
- Yvonne Svanström. Prostitution in Sweden: Debates and policies 1980–2004, in Gangoli G, Westmarland N. International Approaches to Prostitution. The Policy Press, London 2006, pp. 67ff
- Yvonne Svanström. Criminalising the john - a Swedish gender model?, in pp. Outshoorn J (ed.) The Politics of Prostitution: Women's movements, democratic states, and the globalisation of sex commerce. Cambridge 2004, 225ff
