= Svanström =

Svanström is a Swedish surname. As of February 2012, 1752 people in Sweden have this surname. Notable people with the surname include:

- Fredrik Svanström (1885–1959), Finnish athlete
- Kurt Svanström (1915–1996), Swedish football player
- Leif Svanström (1943–2023), Swedish epidemiologist
- Yvonne Svanström (born 1965), Swedish prostitution researcher
