= Ola Alterå =

Swedish politician

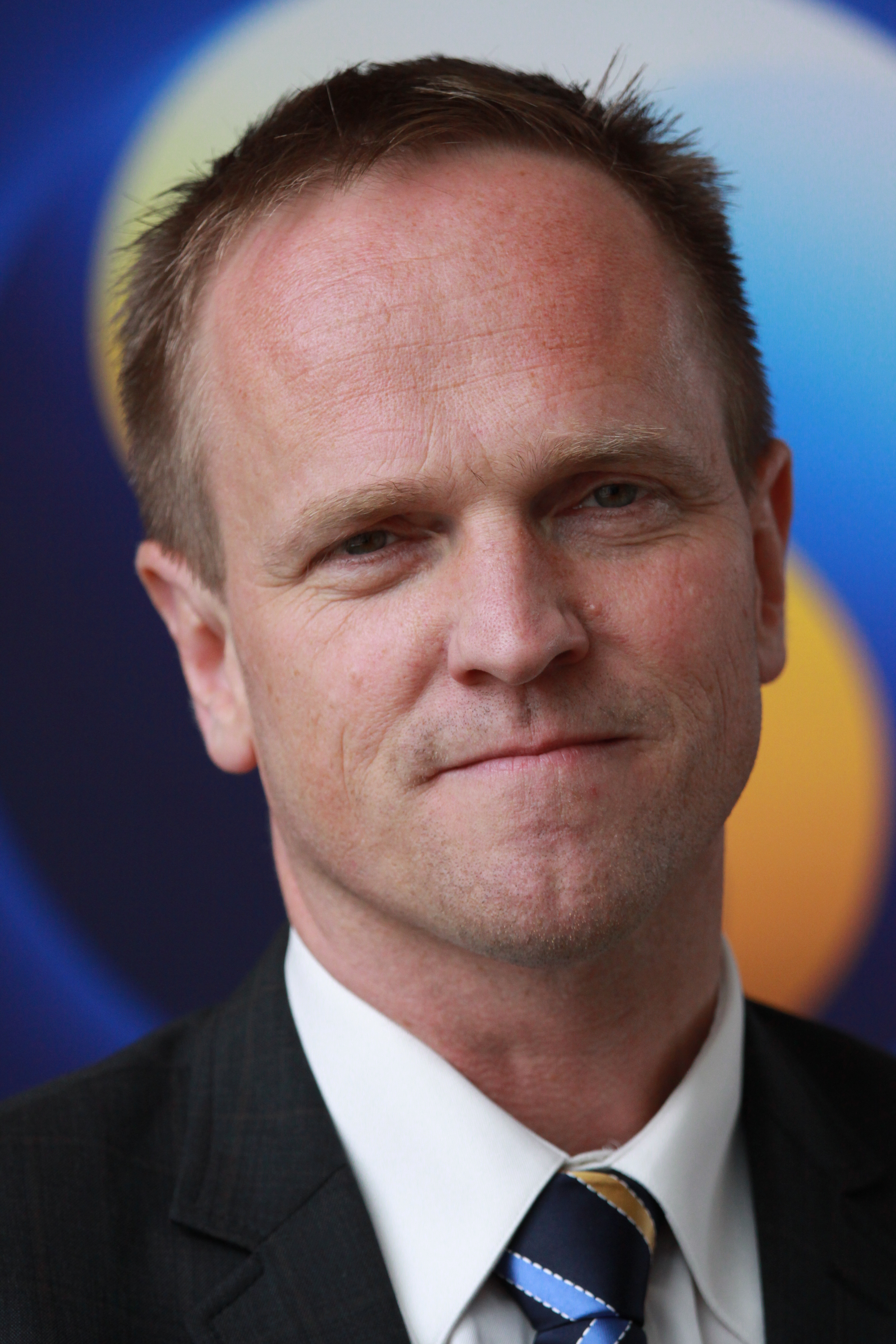
State Secretary Ola Alterå. Photo: Henrik Hansson

Ola Alterå (born 1 January 1965) is a Swedish politician. He is a member of the Centre Party. In 2011, Alterå assumed the role of Country Manager for UNIDO in Kenya.

He was General Manager of the Center Party Youth League from 1990 to 1993 and was succeeded by Kristina Jonäng. After 2006 elections he became State Secretary of Industry, in charge of energy issues.

Alterå grew up in Norrfjärden outside Piteå. In 1985 he moved to Gothenburg, and studied engineering physics at Chalmers University of Technology. He became department director in the EPA's Environmental Economics Unit, anumerous other positions. Alterå has also been a political expert for the Prime Minister 1993–94. He joined the Centre Party in 1990 and during the period 1998-2001 he also worked as Secretary for the Centre Party.

Alterå was previously married to Anna-Karin Hatt, she was also center partisan Secretary of State.
