= Demirok =

Demirok is a surname. Notable people with the surname include:

- Muharrem Demirok (born 1976), Swedish politician
- Uğur Demirok (born 1988), Turkish footballer
