= Fredrick Federley =

Former Swedish politician

Fredrick Federley MEP
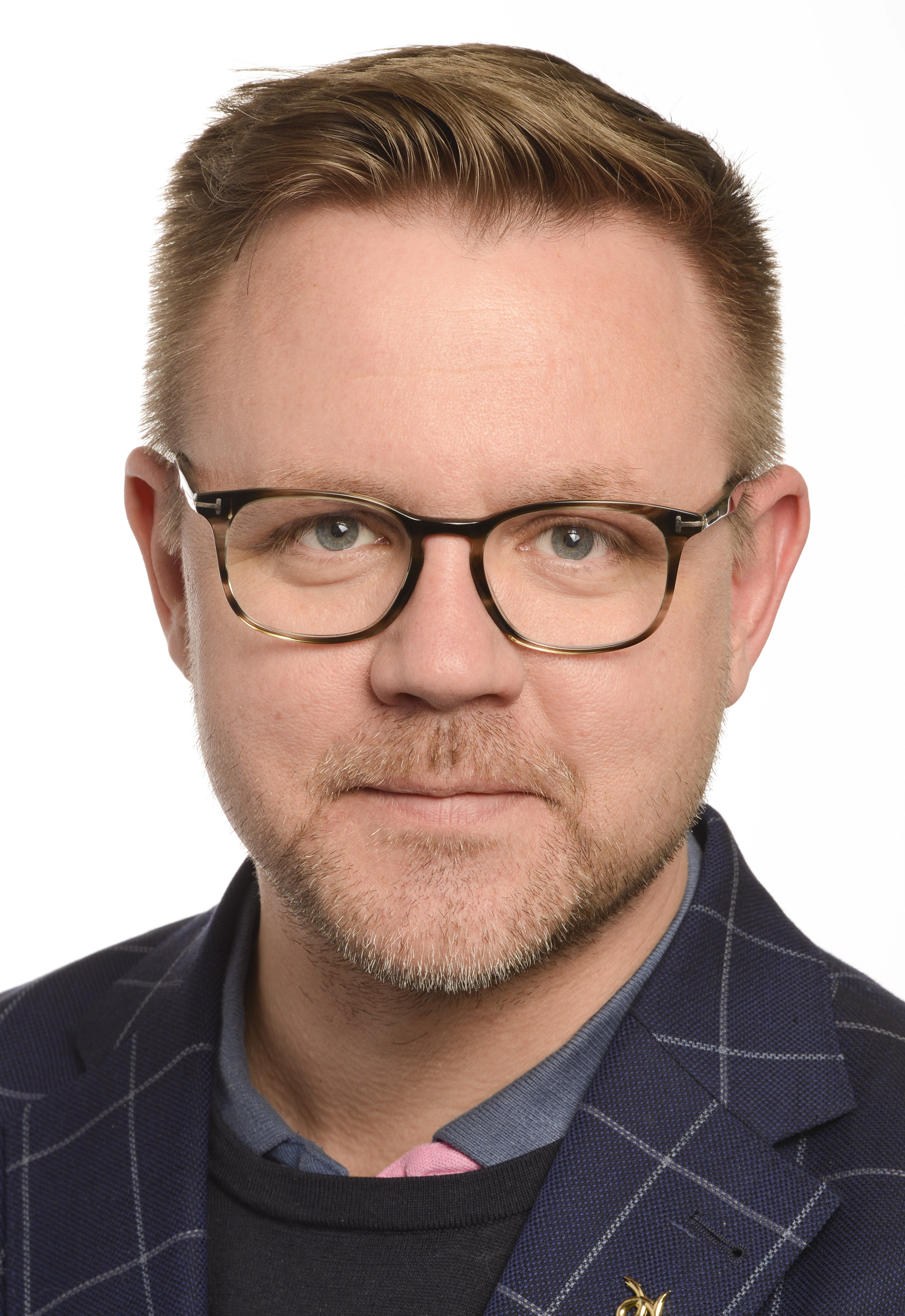
- Fredrick Federley in 2019

Member of the European Parliament for Sweden
- In office 1 July 2014 – 11 December 2020
- Succeeded by: Emma Wiesner

Member of the Swedish Parliament for Stockholm Municipality
- In office 17 September 2006 – 2 July 2014

President of the Centre Party Youth
- In office 9 September 2002 – 21 April 2007
- Preceded by: Malin Svensson
- Succeeded by: Magnus Andersson

Personal details
- Born: Fredrick Erik Federley; 6 May 1978 (age 48) Köping, Sweden
- Party: Centre Party (1994–2020)
- Other political affiliations: Alliance of Liberals and Democrats for Europe (Before 2019); Renew Europe (2019–2020)
- Spouse: Johnny Kroneld (2012–2019)
- Education: Örebro University
- Website: Official website

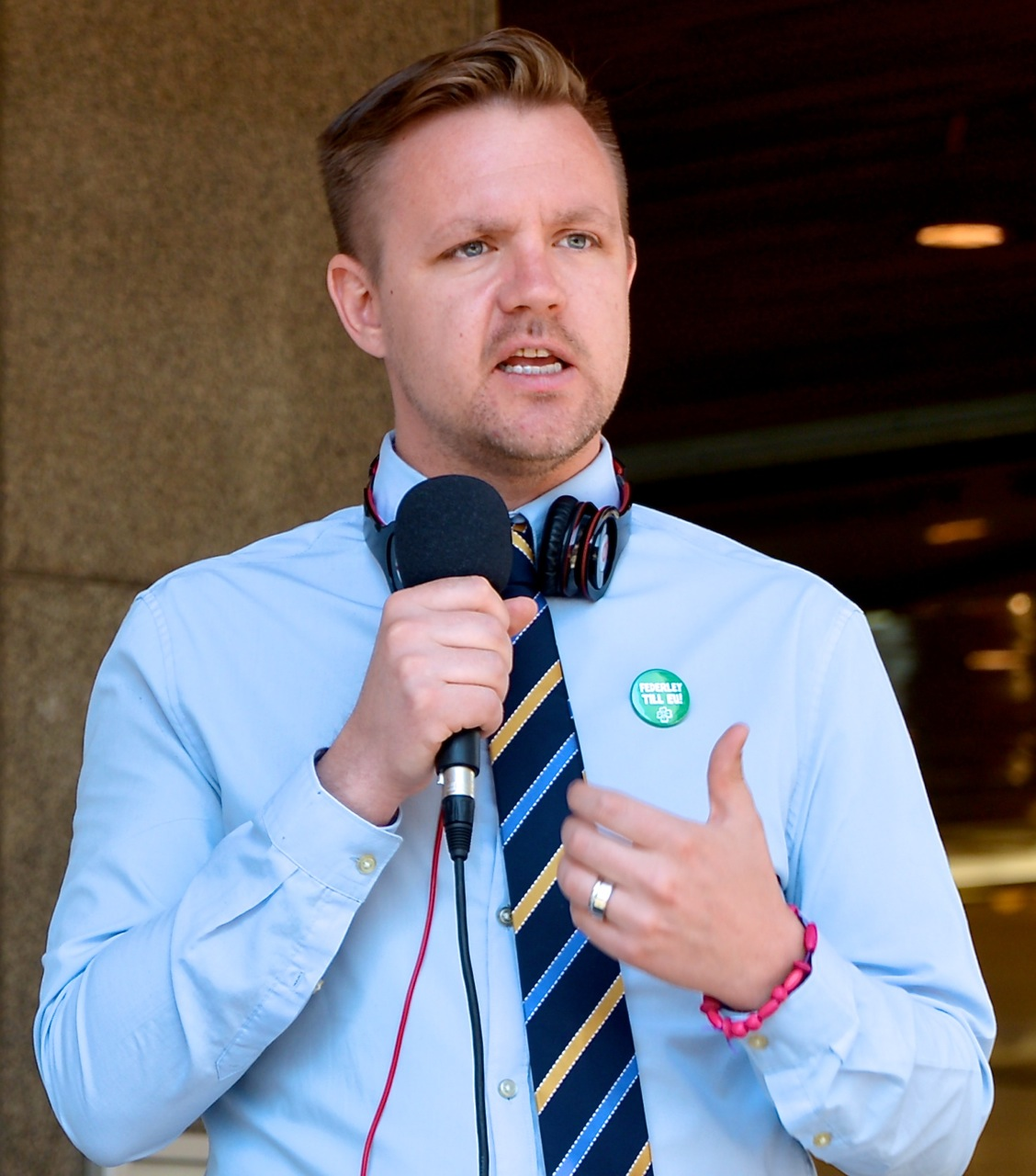
Fredrick Federley speaking near Sergels torg in the 2014 European Parliament election

Fredrick Erik Federley (Swedish pronunciation: [ˈfrěːdrɪk fɛdɛrlɛj]; born 6 May 1978) is a Swedish former politician and Member of the European Parliament (MEP) from Sweden. He was a member of the Centre Party, part of the Alliance of Liberals and Democrats for Europe. He was a member of the Parliament of Sweden from 2006 to 2014 and a MEP from July 2014 until December 2020.

Federley held several posts within the Center Party. From 2002 to 2007, he was the chairman of the youth league, Centre Party Youth (CUF). On 24 September 2015 he was elected Second Vice Chairman of the party. He was first elected to the parliament of Sweden in 2006, and remained a member up until 2014 (with a parental leave in between). In the 2014 European Parliament election, Federley passed the previous MEP for the Center Party, Kent Johansson, in personal votes, and therefore replaced him. In July 2019, he became Vice President of the Renew Europe group in the European Parliament.

He left politics on 11 December 2020, after it became known that he had had a relationship with a man who had been convicted of serious sexual crimes against children.

== Youth and education ==
Federley was born in Munktorp in Köping Municipality, Västmanland County, but grew up in nearby Kungsör. After military service at Uppland Regiment (S1) in Enköping from 1997 to 1998, he studied legal and political science at Örebro University. He later moved to Jakobsberg and worked as a political editor of the newspaper Norrtelje Tidning.

== Political career ==
=== Local politics ===
Federley joined the Centre Party Youth during the 1994 election, and started a local branch of the organization together with a friend. A year and a half later he became vice chairman of the Centre Party Youth Västmanland district, and the following year chairman of the district (a post he kept until October 2000). In the 1998 election he was elected a member of the municipal council in Kungsör. In spring 2000, he was elected vice chairman of the Centre Party Västmanland district (a post he kept until spring 2002). In the 2002 election he was the Centre Party candidate to receive most votes in the Västmanland County constituency, but due to the 8%-rule regarding personal votes the mandate instead went to the first name on the list. On 18 October 2002, Federley was unanimously elected new chairman of the Centre Party Youth, succeeding Malin Svensson. He held the post until May 2007, when Magnus Andersson was elected.

=== Member of the Swedish Parliament, 2006–2014 ===
In the 2006 election Federley was elected a member of the Riksdag for the Stockholm Municipality constituency, along with the actress Solveig Ternström. He was a member of the Riksdag's Committee on Social Insurance and the Swedish delegation to the Parliamentary Assembly of the Organization for Security and Co-operation in Europe (OSCE), and a substitute to the Committee on European Union Affairs. He was re-elected in the 2010 election.

=== First mandate in the European Parliament, 2014–2019 ===
Federley was elected a Member of the European Parliament in the elections held on 25 May 2014, defeating the incumbent Center Party MEP, Kent Johansson. He served as an ordinary member of the Committee on Industry, Research and Energy (ITRE) and Committee of inquiry into Emission Measurements in the Automotive Sector (EMIS); on ITRE, he was coordinator for the Alliance of Liberals and Democrats for Europe Party (ALDE). He was also a substitute member of the Committee on Agriculture and Rural Development (AGRI) and the Committee on the Environment, Public Health and Food Safety (ENVI). He was vice president for the European Parliament's delegation to the Pan-African Parliament.

On 1 September 2015 Federley announced that he was running for President of the ALDE Party. He later stepped down to run as vice president alongside presidential candidate Siim Kallas; Kallas was not elected, but Federley was elected vice president under the new president Hans van Baalen.

In addition to his committee assignments, Federley was a member of the European Parliament Intergroup on Integrity (Transparency, Anti-Corruption and Organized Crime).

=== Second mandate in the European Parliament, 2019–2020 ===
In the 2019 European Parliament election, Federley was re-elected for a second term. After the election the ALDE-group reformed and created the new Renew Europe group. Federley ran for president of the group against, among others, Dacian Cioloș and Sophie in 't Veld, but dropped out of the race after it was clear that Cioloș had secured enough votes to win. He was subsequently appointed vice president of the group and in November 2019 he was appointed to Chair of the Renew Europe working group for Sustainability and Structural Policies, the working group that handles the majority of EU spending.

In his second term, Federley was an ordinary member of the Committee on the Environment, Public Health and Food Safety (ENVI) and a substitute member of the Committee on Agriculture and Rural Development (AGRI).

== Personal life and resignation ==
Federley is openly gay and has performed in a drag persona.

On 11 December 2020, Federley resigned from politics following the disclosure that he had been in a relationship with a man convicted of multiple counts of serious sexual crimes against children. Emma Wiesner was announced as Federley's replacement in the European Parliament the same day.

== Political positions ==
When the Swedish Government announced that it intended to increase the penalty for purchasing sex from six months to one year's imprisonment, effective 1 July 2011, and debated and voted on this on 12 May 2011, the vote was: For 282, Against 1. Federley was the sole opponent, who claimed that the Centre Party attempted to prevent him from speaking against the proposal.

In 2017, Federley was instrumental in blocking the Five Star Movement from joining the ALDE group, which was widely interpreted as a first sign of organised rebellion against group leader Guy Verhofstadt.

Party political offices
Preceded by Malin Svensson	Chairman of the Centre Party Youth; 2002–2007	Succeeded by Magnus Demervall
Preceded by Anna-Karin Hatt	Second Deputy Leader of the Centre Party; 2015–2020	Succeeded by Martin Ådahl
