= Magnus Demervall =

Swedish politician

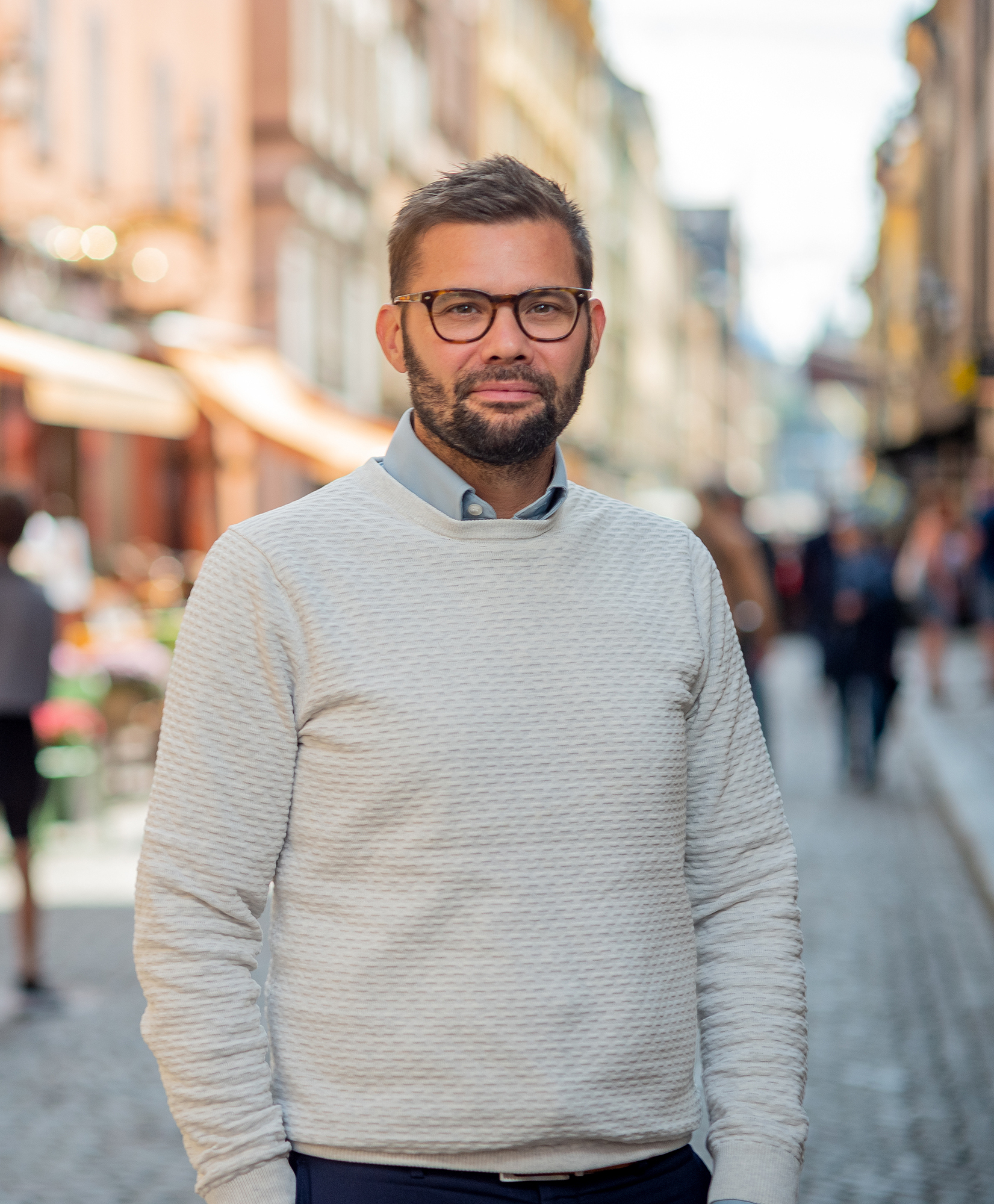
Magnus Demervall in August 2019

Per Magnus Demervall (born Andersson 16 October 1981) is a Swedish politician and previous chairman of the Centre Party Youth, (CUF). Andersson, born in Segersta outside of Bollnäs and now living in Solna outside of Stockholm since 2007, grew up with a single mother. His father is Egyptian and lives in Egypt. After graduating with a degree in engineering, Andersson was elected Chairman of CUF in 2007 and replaced Fredrick Federley, who had held the post for five years.

In the fall of 2008, Andersson started a liberal environment network together with Martin Sjöberg. Andersson’s commitment to this network has led to open criticism of the Centre Party and demands for climate subsidies, something that is now enabled by the government. Andersson’s environmental policies are based on economical incentives rather than rules and regulations as tools of governance to drive economical and technical development in the green sector.

Andersson has worked hard to have LAS (Lagen om AnställningsSkydd) reformed and during 2009 Andersson’s work resulted in a shift in the Centre party’s official position regarding LAS. After this, other parties in the Alliance followed with ideas on reforming LAS.

Andersson is like many other young politicians, active opposer to the Enforcement Directive (IPRED) and the legislative change regulating the National Defence Radio Establishment (FRA). He was the first chairman of the youth organizations of the Alliance to openly criticize IPRED. He has also strongly criticized FRA and has greatly influenced the view of the party. Furthermore, Andersson has suggested the establishment of a constitutional court with the purpose of protecting personal integrity.

Andersson is integrity certified by the Centerpartiet’s integrity network and CenterUpproret.

Other policy issues Anderson has been active in are issues regarding housing and market rents. Andersson was the one who started the appeal within Centerpartiet regarding healthcare for illegal immigrants; an appeal that 70 municipality and county council members have signed.

Andersson was campaigning for a place in the Swedish parliament in the 2010 election, but did not succeed. He was however elected municipal commissioner for Solna municipality.

Preceded by Fredrick Federley	Chairman of the Centre Party Youth; 2007–2011	Succeeded by Hanna Wagenius
