= Susanne Dodillet =

Swedish feminist

Susanne Dodillet (born 1977) is a Swedish feminist, historian and researcher at the University of Gothenburg.

== Early life and education ==
Dodillet was born in Böblingen, and has been living in Sweden since 2001. Dodillet earned a master's degree in cultural education from the University of Hildesheim in Germany (2001) and a PhD in the history of ideas from the University of Gothenburg in 2009.

Her doctoral thesis Är sex arbete? (Is sex work?) compared the Swedish and German policy process with respect to prostitution. In her dissertation she argued for rights for sex workers, including pension rights. Her thesis was considered very controversial, as her central claim contradicted the evidence of earlier research (from 1977) based on interviews with 219 sex workers which documented the lifelong interpersonal traumas that both led to and accompanied their life in prostitution.

== Career ==
Dodillet is on staff at the Institute for Education and Special Education at the University of Gothenburg.

== Bibliography ==
=== Books ===
- Är sex arbete?: svensk och tysk prostitutionspolitik sedan 1970-talet. Vertigo akademika Stockholm 2009. ISBN 978-91-85000-59-3

=== Articles ===
- The Swedish Sex Purchase Act: Claimed Success and Documented Effects. S Dodillet, P Östergren. May 2011

== See also ==
- Prostitution in Sweden
