= Anna-Karin Hatt =

Swedish corporate leader and former politician

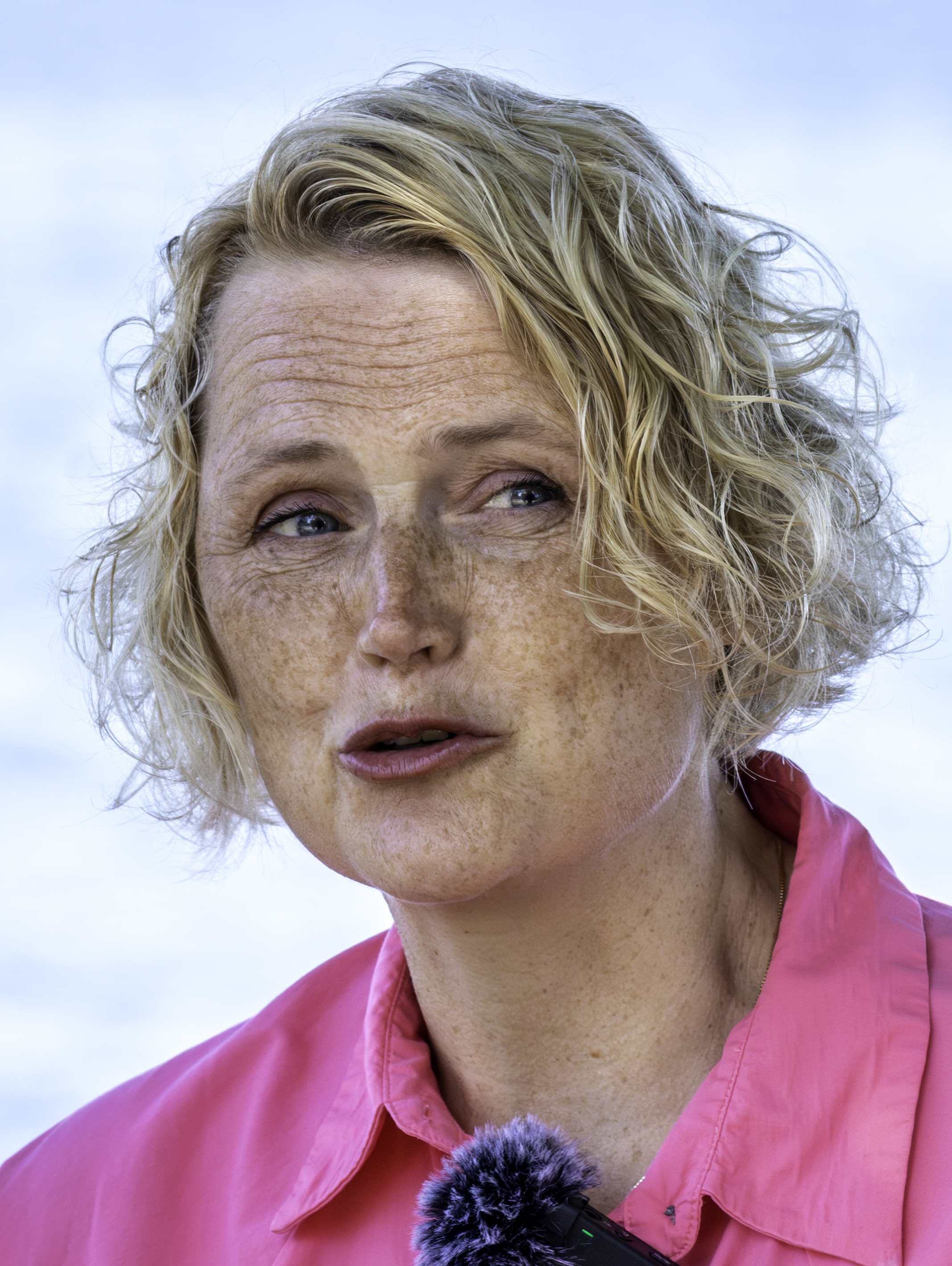
- Hatt in 2025

Leader of the Centre Party
- In office 3 May 2025 – 13 November 2025
- Preceded by: Muharrem Demirok
- Succeeded by: Elisabeth Thand Ringqvist

Minister for Energy
- In office 29 September 2011 – 3 October 2014
- Prime Minister: Fredrik Reinfeldt
- Preceded by: Maud Olofsson
- Succeeded by: Ibrahim Baylan

Minister for Digital Development
- In office 29 September 2011 – 3 October 2014
- Prime Minister: Fredrik Reinfeldt
- Preceded by: Åsa Torstensson
- Succeeded by: Mehmet Kaplan

Minister for Regions
- In office 5 October 2010 – 29 September 2011
- Prime Minister: Fredrik Reinfeldt
- Preceded by: Office established
- Succeeded by: Annie Lööf

Personal details
- Born: Sara Anna-Karin Andersson; 7 December 1972 (age 53) Gislaved, Sweden
- Party: Centre
- Spouse(s): Ola Alterå (m. 1996; div. 2002) Greger Hatt (m. 2009; div. 2011) Pierre Sandberg (m. 2019; div. 2020)
- Children: 3, including Ida Alterå

Sara Anna-Karin Hatt (née Andersson; born 7 December 1972) is a Swedish politician and corporate executive who was the leader of the Centre Party from May to November 2025.

Hatt served as Minister for Regions from 2010 to 2011, as Minister for Digital Development from 2010 to 2014 and as Minister for Energy from 2011 to 2014. She was CEO of Almega, the employers' organisation for the Swedish service sector, from 2015 to 2019 and CEO of Federation of Swedish Farmers from 2019 to 2025.

== Biography ==
Anna-Karin Andersson was born on 7 December 1972 and raised in Hylte Municipality in Halland County, Sweden. She was from 1994 to 1998 part of the national board of the Center Party Youth League, and the 1995–1998 President of the Nordic Center Youth League. In the early 1990s Hatt studied political science, international relations and conflict and peace studies at the University of Gothenburg.

She has been writing editorials in Hallands Nyheter and Södermanlands Nyheter in 1995 and became Permanent Secretary of the Center Party International Foundation. From 2000 she was Vice President of the Stockholm-based public relations agency Kind & Partners. She returned to politics in late 2003, when Maud Olofsson appointed her chief of staff for the Center Party, gave her a key role in the development of the Alliance election platform for the parliamentary election of 2006. During that time she assisted Maud Olofsson in writing the book Min dröm för Sverige, published in 2006 and Ett land av friherrinnor (2010). During her time in office, she was the head of the Government's Digital Commission, responsible for creating A Digital Agenda for Sweden.

The magazine Fokus designated her as Sweden's 23rd most powerful person in 2011. After being appointed Minister for IT and Regional Affairs, she was named as the most powerful woman within IT in Sweden by Computer Sweden. In 2011 she ran for chairperson of the Centre Party but lost to Annie Lööf.

Following the 2014 election defeat and her defeat from the Riksdag, Hatt announced that she will leave politics and step down as second deputy party leader in 2015.

=== Leader of the Centre Party (May–November 2025) ===
Muharrem Demirok resigned on 24 February 2025 as chairperson of the Centre Party following heavy internal disagreements on what parties the Centre Party should work with after the 2026 elections as well as low polling. Hatt initially refused to run in the leadership race but backtracked agreeing to run after a request by the party leadership for her become the next chairperson. Following this announcement she did not take any direct stance on what parties the Centre Party should work with.

On 3 May 2025, Hatt officially was elected as new party leader of the Centre Party. After her election as party leader she announced she would refuse collaboration with the Sweden Democrats. She received attention when it was announced she would get a higher salary than the prime minister of Sweden, and the highest of all political parties.

On 15 October 2025, Hatt announced her resignation as leader of the Centre Party during a press conference. She cited the increasing level of hatred and threats directed at her as the main reason for stepping down, describing the situation as overwhelming. She explained that her decision was not based on a single event but rather on a growing sense of insecurity, both personally and professionally. She remained on her post until the party congress in November.

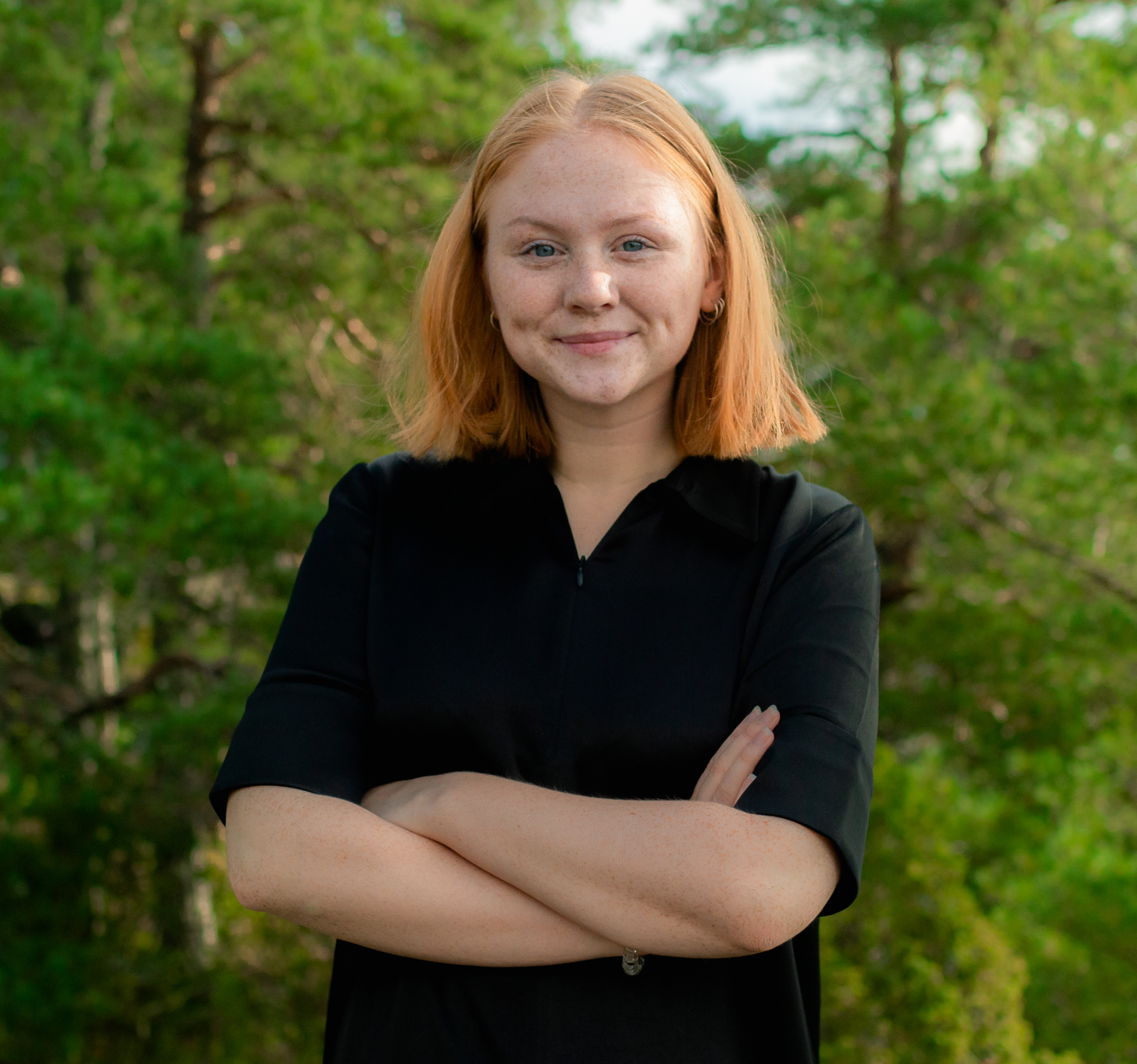
Hatt's eldest daughter and politician, Ida Alterå

== Personal life ==
The magazine Fokus designated her as Sweden's 95th most powerful person in 2008.

She was married to Ola Alterå from 1996 to 2002 and was then married to Greger Hatt from 2009 to 2011 and Pierre Sandberg 2019–2020. She has three children, born in 1997, 2002 and 2011. She lives in southern Stockholm. Between 2019 and 2021, her eldest daughter Ida Alterå was chairman of the Center Party Youth.

Party political offices
New title	Second Deputy Leader of the Centre Party; 2011–2015	Succeeded by Fredrick Federley
Preceded by Muharrem Demirok	Leader of the Centre Party; 2025	Succeeded by Elisabeth Thand Ringqvist
Political offices
New title	Minister for Regions; 2010–2011	Succeeded by Annie Lööf
Preceded by Åsa Torstensson	Minister for Digital Development; 2010–2014	Succeeded by Mehmet Kaplan
Preceded by Maud Olofsson	Minister for Energy; 2011–2014	Succeeded by Ibrahim Baylan
