= Emelie Rossheim =

Swedish politician (born 1999)

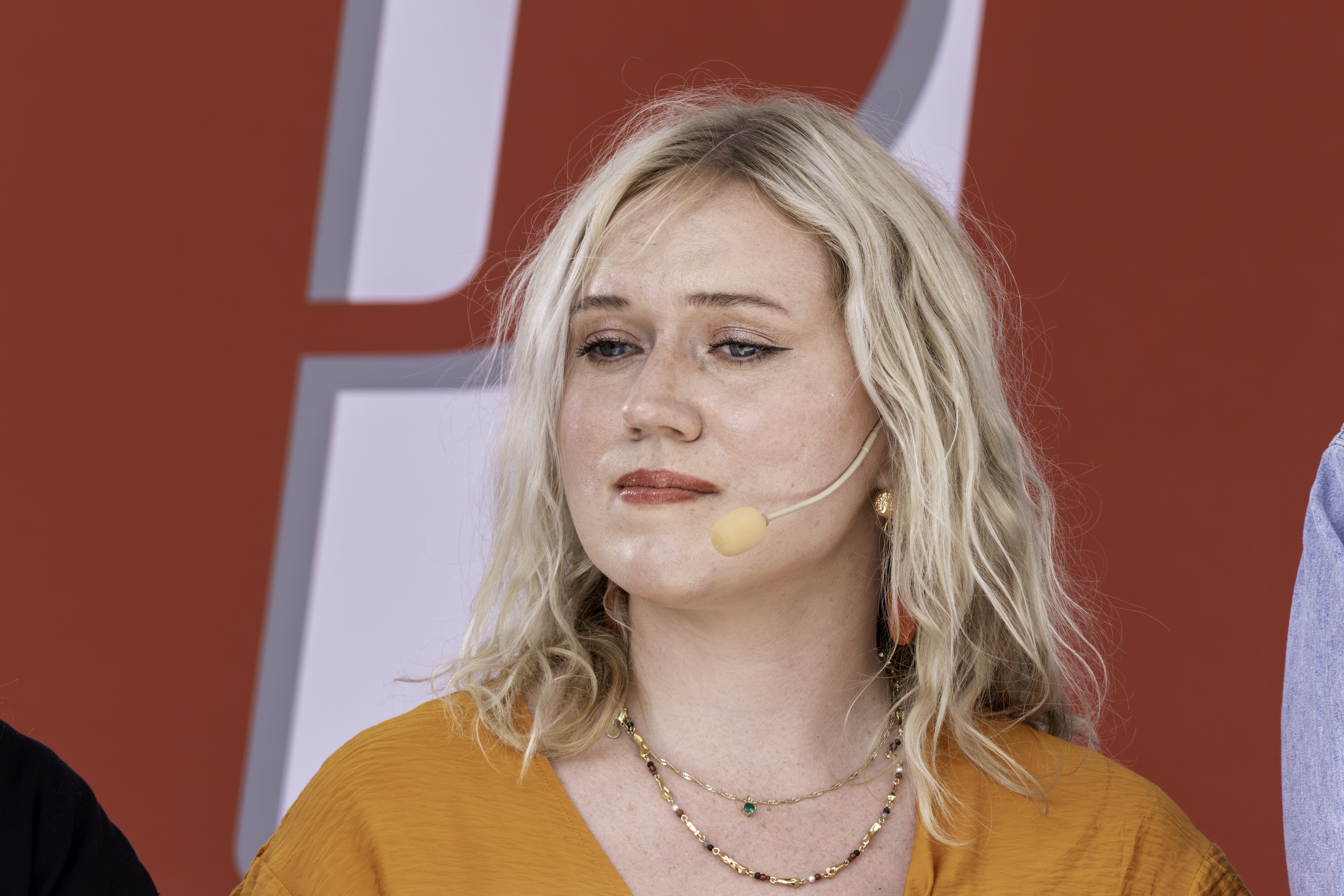
- Rossheim in 2026

Member of the Riksdag
- In office 10 January 2024 – 23 June 2024
- Preceded by: Niels Paarup-Petersen
- Succeeded by: Niels Paarup-Petersen
- Constituency: Malmö Municipality

Personal details
- Born: Emelie Louise Patricia Nyman; 20 May 1999 (age 27)
- Party: Centre Party
- Education: Lund University; BA, Political science

Emelie Louise Patricia Rossheim (née Emelie Louise Patricia Nyman; born 20 May 1999) is a Swedish politician serving as chairwoman of the Centre Party Youth since 2025. From January to June 2024, she was a member of the Riksdag.

== Personal life ==
In December 2025, she married and took the last name Rossheim.
