= Kristina Jonäng =

Swedish politician (born 1968)

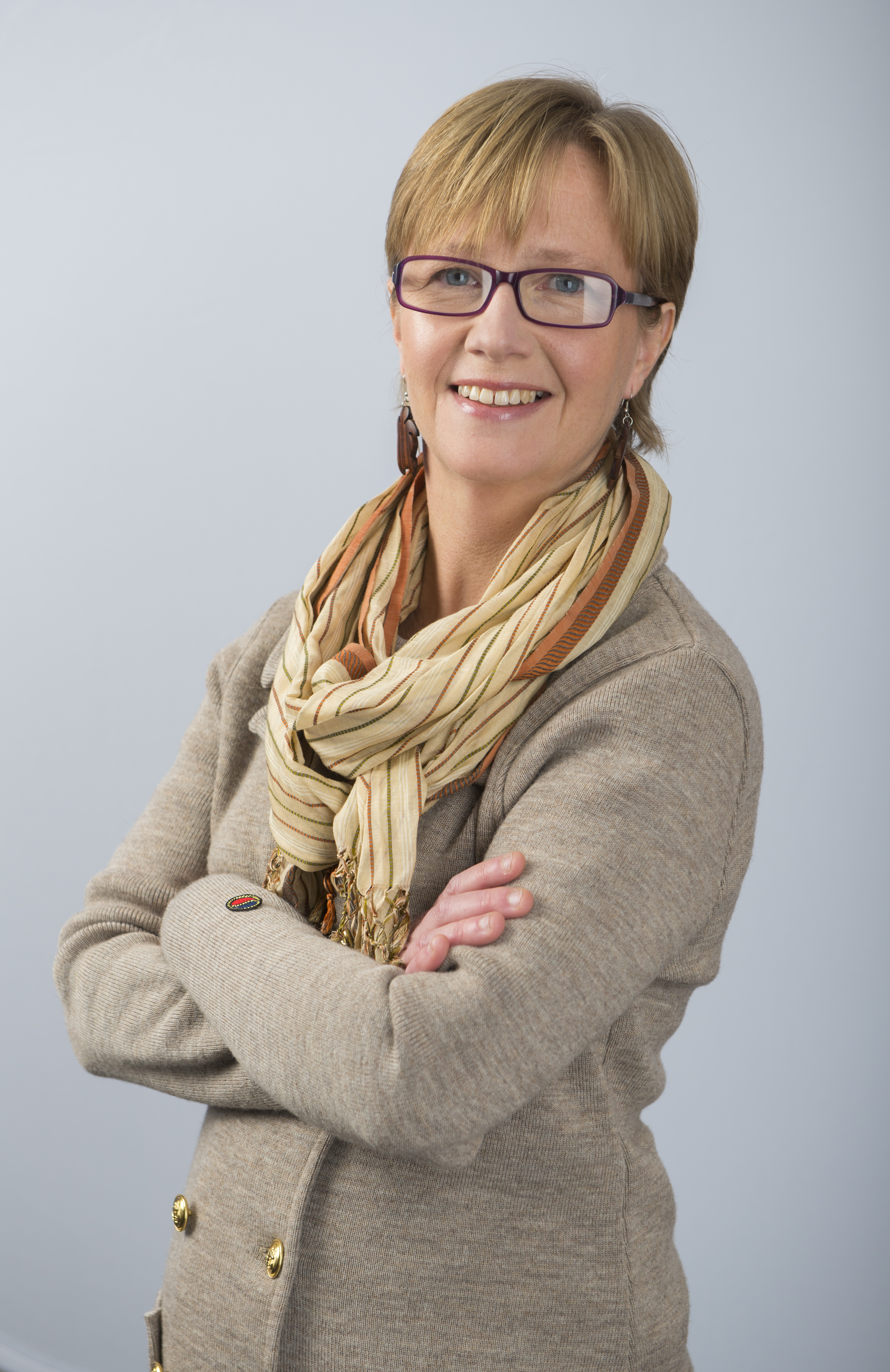
Kristina Jonäng - Pressbildsfotografering 2013

Kristina Jonäng (born 1968) is a Swedish politician. She is a member of the Centre Party and has been a member of the Västra Götaland Regional Council representing Bohuslän / Västra Götaland West since September 2010.

== Political career ==
She was elected president of the Centre Party Youth Union in 1993, the first woman to hold this post. In 1996 she was succeeded by Magdalena Fransson. Jonäng was Chief of Staff of Environment Minister Andreas Carlgren during 2006 to 2008 and led the management strategy of the Center Party's national organization during the period 2008–2010.

She is a regional councillor for the Västra Götaland region, including chair of the environmental committee during the period 1999-2006 and a substitute for the federal board of Swedish municipalities and county councils.

== Education and personal life ==
Jonäng obtained a bachelor's degree in economics from Göteborg University. She has three children.
