= Yvonne Svanström =

Swedish historian

Yvonne Svanström, (born 1965), is an associate professor and head of the Department of Economic History at Stockholm University.

== Career ==
She earned her PhD in 2000, with a dissertation ("Policing Public Women. The Regulation of Prostitution in Stockholm") on prostitution in the 19th century. An expanded and popularized version of her thesis was published in Swedish as "Offentliga kvinnor. Prostitution I Sverige 1812–1918".

Her subsequent work has examined Swedish prostitution policy through to the contemporary era, and comparisons with other European policy. Svanström's work is the main source of information on the history of prostitution in Sweden.

She is currently (as of 2026) researching the welfare state and labour market in Sweden.

== Research projects ==
- To trade in Sex: Regulation, Liberalization or Criminalization? Prostitution Politics in Sweden 1930–2000. Riksbankens Jubileumsfond

== Bibliography ==
=== Books ===
- Policing Public Women. The Regulation of Prostitution in Stockholm 1812–1880. PhD Thesis. Stockholm: Atlas Akademi 2000. ISBN 91-89044-75-4.

Review: Holloway P. Regulation and the Nation: Comparative Perspectives on Prostitution and Public Policy. Journal of Women's History, Volume 15, Number 1, Spring 2003, pp. 202–211
Review: Karlsson G. Övervakning av offentliga kvinnor i Stockholm. Historisk Tidskrift 123:3 (2003) 453–60

- Offentliga kvinnor. Prostitution I Sverige 1812–1918, Ordfront förlag 2006. ISBN 91-7037-188-1.

Review: Ella Andrén. Dagensbok 12 Dec 2008
Review: "Om kvinnor som smittar". Kerstin Ekman Dagens Nyheter 29 August 2006.

- Femininiteter, maskuliniteter och kriminalitet, Studentlitteratur AB 2003. ISBN 91-44-03055-X.
- Sedligt, renligt, lagligt : prostitution i Norden 1880–1940, Makadam förlag 2007. ISBN 91-7061-040-1.
- ”En självklar efterfrågan? Om torskar och sexköpare under hundra år" i Yvonne Svanström och Kjell Östberg (ed.), Än män då? Om kön och feminism i Sverige under 150 år, Atlas Akademi, Stockholm, 2004

=== Book chapters ===
- The Main Source of Syphilis is Prostitution : Fallen Women and Prostitutes in Medical Discourse 1812–1875. The Case of Stockholm, in Sex, State and Society : Comparative Perspectives on the History of Sexuality. Almqvist & Wiksell, Umeå 2000. pp. 239–268. 91-7191-871-X
- "Offentliga Kvinnor i Offentliga Rum: Prostitutionens Reglementering i 1800–talets Stockholm (Public Women in Public Spaces: Regulating Prostitution in the 1800s in Stockholm),” in Christina Florin and Lars Kvarnstrom, eds., Kvinnor på gransen till medborgarskap: Genus, politik och offentlighet, 1800–1950, Stockholm: Atlas Akademi, 2001
- "Criminalising the John: A Swedish Gender Model?,” in Joyce Outshoorn, ed., The Politics of Prostitution: Women's Movements, Democratic States and the Globalisation of Sex Commerce, Cambridge: Cambridge University Press, 2004
- Prostitution in Sweden: Debates and policies 1980–2004, in Gangoli G, Westmarland N. International Approaches to Prostitution. The Policy Press, London 2006, pp. 67ff
- ”Ellen Bergman och Federationen: Kvinnoemancipation och sedlighet 1880–1910" i Anna Jansdotter och Yvonne Svanström (red.) Sedligt, renligt, lagligt: Prostitution i Norden 1880–1940, Göteborg; Stockholm: Makadam förlag, 2007
- ”Kampen i katedern – att undervisa i genushistoria" i Maria Sjöberg och Yvonne Svanström (red.) Att göra historia – vänbok till Christina Florin (Stockholm, Institutet för framtidsstudier, 2008)
- 'Handel med kvinnor: debatten i Sverige och Nederlanderna om prostitution och trafficking', in C. Florin and C. Bergqvist (eds.) Framtiden i samtiden: Könsrelationer i förändring i Sverige och omvärlden. Institutet för framtidsstudier. Sverige. 2004. pp. 290–323

=== Journal articles ===
- “Through the Prism of Prostitution: Conceptions of Women and Sexuality in Sweden at Two Fins-de-Siècle,” Nordic Journal of Women’s Studies, 2005 (13): 48–58
- "Prostitution as Vagrancy: Sweden 1923–1964", Journal of Scandinavian Studies in Criminology and Crime Prevention, 2006 (7): 142–163
- Holgersson, C. and Svanström, Y. (2007) 'Sex clubs and escorts – on the consequences of sexual entertaining in organisations' Gender, Work & Organization Special issue: Sexual spaces.

=== Edited collections ===
- Anna Jansdotter, Yvonne Svanström (ed.), Sedligt, renligt, lagligt. Prostitution i Norden 1880–1940, Makadam, 2007
- Svanström, Yvonne. Östberg, Kjell (ed.) Än män då? Kön och feminism i Sverige under 150 år ft. Atlas Akademi 2004. 277 sid. ISBN 91-7389-128-2.
- Maria Sjöberg och Yvonne Svanström (ed.) Att göra historia – vänbok till Christina Florin (Stockholm, Institutet för framtidsstudier, 2008)

=== Miscellaneous ===
- Florinn C, Manns U, Svanström Y, Östberg K, Isaksson E. Feminism without feminists? Gender and State Politics in Sweden, 1850–2000. A Round-Table Discussion

== See also ==
- Prostitution in Sweden
