= Petra Östergren =

Swedish feminist writer, debater, social commentator and instructor in self defense

Anna Petra Cecilia Östergren (born 29 September 1965 in Kiruna Municipality) is a Swedish writer and social anthropologist who has also worked as a self-defense instructor. She holds an MA in social anthropology from Stockholm University and received her PhD in social anthropology from Lund University in 2024. Her doctoral thesis is titled Sweden's Ban on Sex-Purchase: Morality politics and the governance of prostitution. Östergren has published both fiction and non-fiction.

== Research ==
Östergren's research examines morality politics. In 2024, she received her PhD in social anthropology from Lund University with the thesis Sweden's Ban on Sex-Purchase: Morality politics and the governance of prostitution. Drawing on multisided ethnographic research, the thesis examines the Swedish sex-purchase ban from legal and political perspectives within the framework of morality politics.

She led the Swedish part of the EU-funded DemandAT project 2014-2017, which investigated demand-side approaches to human trafficking. Her work with Isabelle Johansson included studies of prostitution policy in Sweden, Germany and New Zealand, interviews with Swedish men who purchased sex, and policy recommendations on preventing exploitation and trafficking in the sex work sector. As part of this research, she developed a typology distinguishing between repressive, restrictive and integrative prostitution policies, subsequently published in The SAGE Handbook of Global Sexuality.

== Published works ==
Östergren's earlier writing addressed feminist perspectives on sexuality, violence and power. In a 1996 article in Bang, she questioned prevailing feminist approaches to violence in same-sex relationships, transgender issues and commercial sex. The article, alongside her decision to teach self-defence to men, contributed to a break with radical feminist circles in Sweden.

In 2006, she published Porr, horor och feminister (Porn, Whores and Feminists), an examination of Swedish opposition to pornography and prostitution. In 2008, she edited F-ordet – Mot en ny feminism (The F-word – Towards a New Feminism), bringing together researchers, writers and commentators to explore feminist issues from different perspectives.

In 2010 she published the first part of the triology Berättelsen om Esmara (Esmara's tale).

== Self-defence ==
In the 1980s Östergren helped launch a feminist self-defense movement in Sweden and ran the Kung Fu club in the kajukenbo style in an effort to help women defend themselves against sexual assault. She is the author of Slå tillbaka!: Handbok i självförsvar (Fight back!; A handbook of self-defence) published in 1993.

In 1996 she also wrote a book about her mother, who was beaten to death by a man she had had a brief relationship with, entitled Att komma till ro med det allra värsta (Coming to terms with the worst).

== Work ==
In addition to her books, Östergren has written regularly for newspapers and magazines, including Svenska Dagbladet, LO-tidningen, Expressen, Aftonbladet, Axess magasin and Voltaire and gives public talks, and is consulted on prostitution and gender issues.

== Bibliography ==
=== Books ===
- Östergren, Petra (1993). Slå tillbaka! Handbok i självförsvar för kvinnor. Natur & Kultur. Revised edition, 1998.
- Östergren, Petra (1996). Att komma till ro med det allra värsta. Natur & Kultur.
- Östergren, Petra (2006). Porr, horor och feminister. Natur & Kultur.
- Östergren, Petra (ed.) (2008). F-ordet – Mot en ny feminism. Alfabeta.
- Östergren, Petra (2010). Berättelsen om Esmara. Piratförlaget.

=== Book chapters and research reports ===
- Östergren, Petra (2010). "Att förstå prostitution". In Lundberg, P. O. and Löfgren-Mårtenson, L. (eds.), Sexologi. Liber, pp. 192–197.
- Östergren, Petra (2012). "Sexköp, mer än bara sex". In Wigorts Yngvesson, S. (ed.), Privat på jobbet: Diskussioner om etik, lag och normer kring sexköp och porrkonsumtion. Kompetensrådet för utveckling i staten (KRUS), pp. 85–99.
- Dodillet, Susanne and Östergren, Petra (2013). "The Swedish Sex Purchase Act: Claimed Success and Documented Effects". In Wagenaar, H., Altink, S. and Amesberger, H. (eds.), Final Report of the International Comparative Study of Prostitution. Platform31, pp. 109–136.
- Östergren, Petra (2017). From Zero Tolerance to Full Integration: Rethinking Prostitution Policies. DemandAT Working Paper No. 10.
- Östergren, Petra (2017). Preventing Exploitation and Trafficking in the Sex Work Sector. DemandAT European Policy Brief.
- Östergren, Petra (2018). "Sweden". In Jahnsen, S. Ø. and Wagenaar, H. (eds.), Assessing Prostitution Policies in Europe. Routledge, pp. 169–184.
- Östergren, Petra (2020). "From Zero Tolerance to Full Integration: Rethinking Prostitution Policies". In Davy, Z. et al. (eds.), The SAGE Handbook of Global Sexualities. SAGE, pp. 569–599.
- Johansson, Isabelle and Östergren, Petra (2021). "Vem avgör? Om ansvar och brottsförebyggande åtgärder när sexköp är olagligt". In de Cabo y Moreda, A., Holmström, C. and Kuosmanen, J. (eds.), Sex mot ersättning: Säljare, köpare, makt och moral. Studentlitteratur, pp. 169–194.

=== Theses ===
- Östergren, Petra (1999). Västerländska tankedrag som påverkat den svenska sexköpslagens förarbeten. Bachelor's thesis, Department of Social Anthropology, Stockholm University.
- Östergren, Petra (2003). Synden ideologiserad: Modern svensk prostitutionspolicy som identitets- och trygghetsskapare. Master's thesis, Department of Social Anthropology, Stockholm University.
- Östergren, Petra (2024). Sweden's Ban on Sex-Purchase: Morality politics and the governance of prostitution. Doctoral thesis, Lund University. ISBN 978-91-8104-159-0.

=== Other publications ===
- Östergren, Petra (n.d.). "Sex Workers Critique of Swedish Prostitution Policy".

== See also ==
- Prostitution in Sweden
