= Muharrem Demirok =

Swedish politician (born 1976)

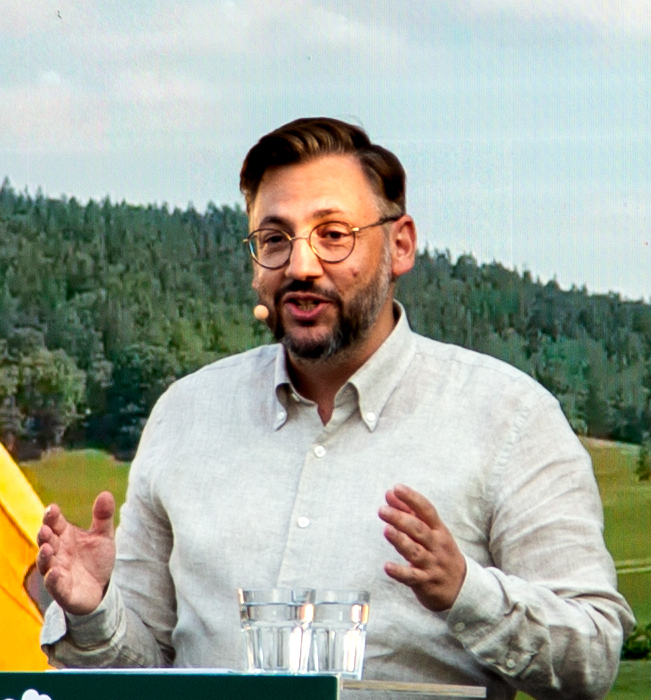
- Muharrem Demirok at the Almedalen Week in 2023

Leader of the Centre Party
- In office 2 February 2023 – 3 May 2025
- Preceded by: Annie Lööf
- Succeeded by: Anna-Karin Hatt

Member of the Riksdag
- Incumbent
- Assumed office 27 September 2022
- Constituency: Östergötland County

Personal details
- Born: 3 October 1976 (age 49) Huddinge, Sweden
- Party: Centre
- Children: 3

Muharrem Daniel Demirok (born 3 October 1976) is a Swedish politician who served as leader of the Centre Party from 2023 to 2025. Additionally, Demirok has been a member of parliament since September 2022.

== Early life ==
Demirok was born on 3 October 1976 in Huddinge, Stockholm County, Sweden, to a Swedish mother and Turkish father.

== Career ==
He is a member of the Centre Party. From 2009 to 2022, he served as a municipal councillor in the municipality of Linköping. Following the 2022 Swedish general election, he became a member of parliament. On 11 January 2023, during the 2023 Centre Party leadership election, he was endorsed by the party's election committee as the candidate to succeed Annie Lööf, the incumbent leader of Centre Party. He was appointed party leader on 2 February, during a party meeting in Helsingborg. On 24 February 2025, Muharrem Demirok announced his resignation from his position as party leader and would remain in office until a successor was appointed. On 3 May 2025, Anna-Karin Hatt was elected as new party leader.

== Personal life ==
Demirok has been convicted for two counts of assault, for which he received fines and did community service. The first assault took place in 1995 with another student during his high school studies. The second assault happened in 1999, when he ended up in an altercation with another student at a university party in Linköping. He is in a cohabitating partnership and has three children.

== Honours and decorations ==
Sweden:

- 15 September 2023: Recipient of the Commemorative Golden Jubilee Medal of His Majesty The King.

Party political offices
Preceded by Annie Lööf	Leader of the Centre Party; 2023–2025	Succeeded by Anna-Karin Hatt
