= Hanna Wagenius =

Swedish blogger and politician

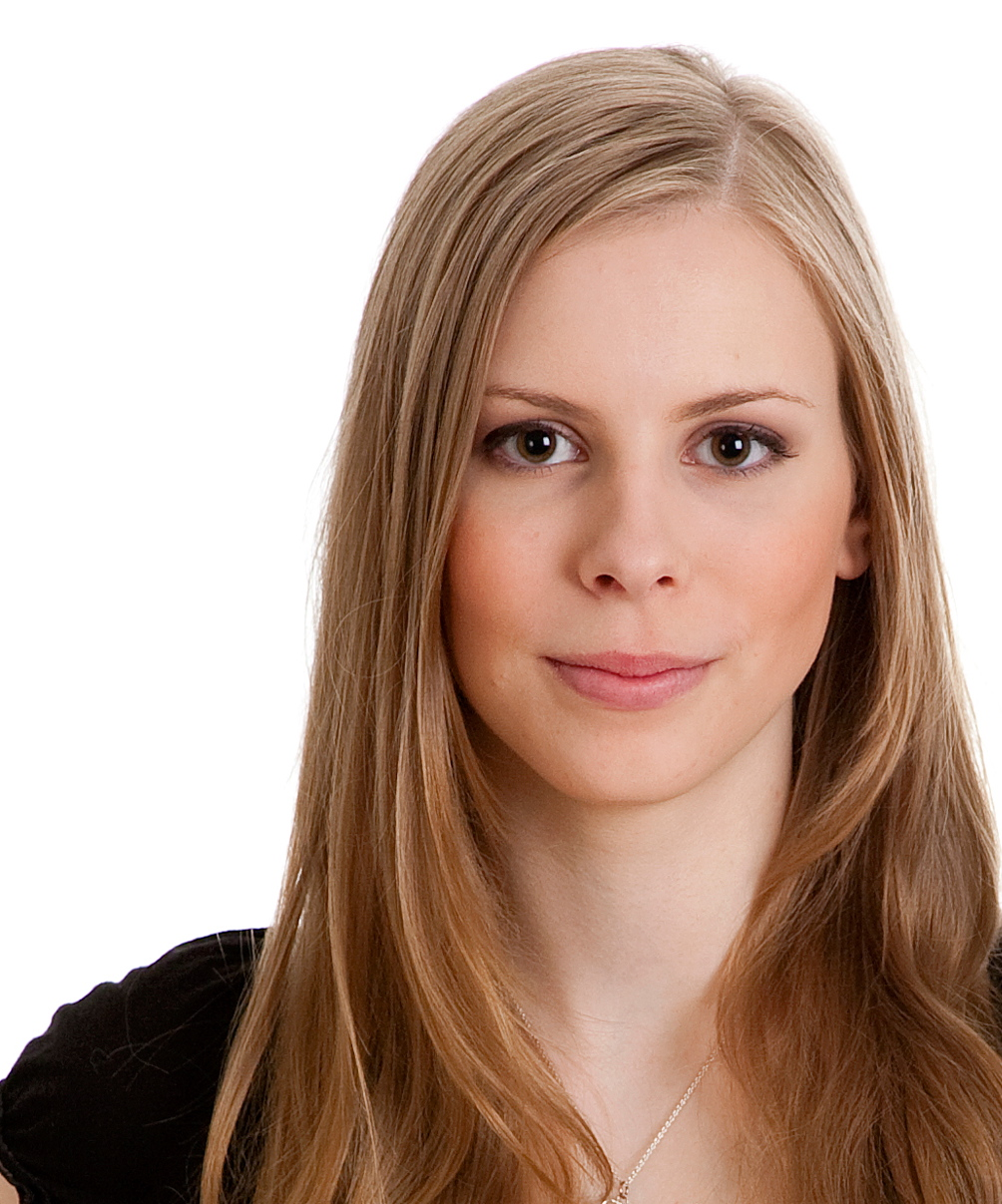
Hanna Mattsson Wagenius

Hanna Birgitta Kristina Mattsson Wagenius (born 2 November 1988) is a Swedish blogger and politician. From 5 June 2011 to 26 June 2015 she was chairperson of the Centre Party Youth. She studied law at Uppsala University.

Wagenius was born at Flon in Härjedalen, Sweden.
