= Centre Party Youth =

Swedish political organisation

Centre Party Youth Centerpartiets ungdomsförbund
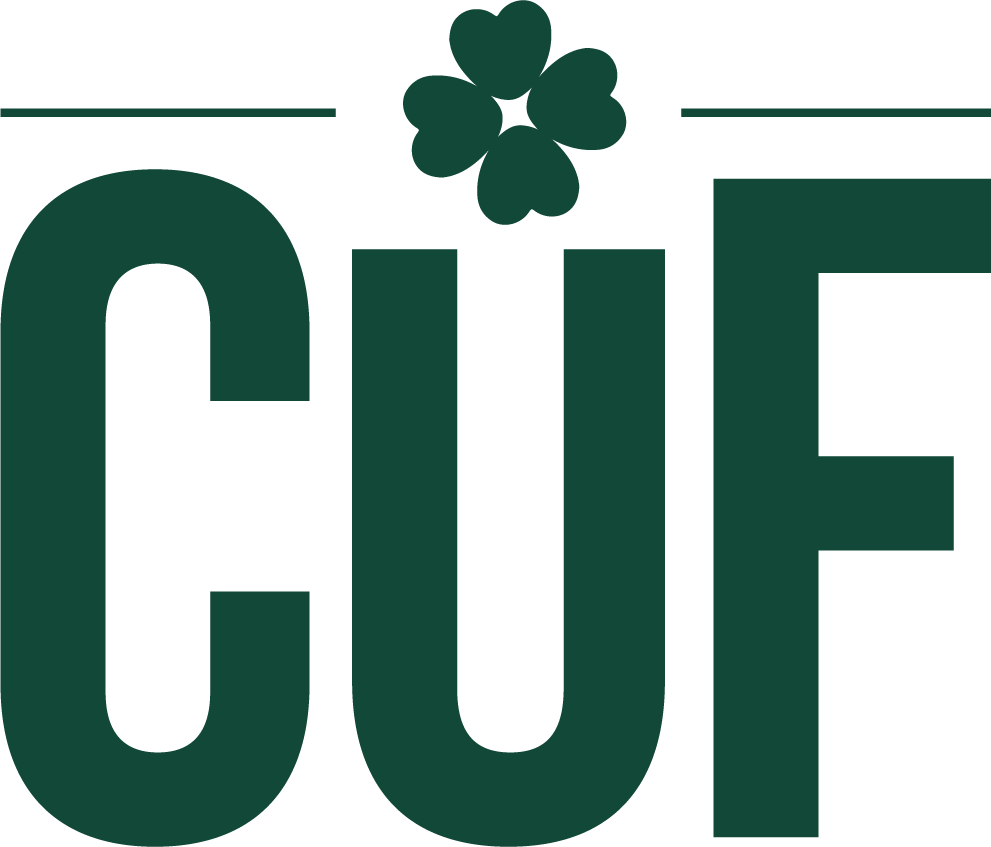
- President: Emelie Rossheim
- Secretary General: Olof Lundgren
- Founded: 1919; 107 years ago
- Headquarters: Stora Nygatan 4, Stockholm
- Membership: 1 200 (2020)
- Ideology: Liberalism; Libertarianism; Green liberalism Neo-liberalism; Economic liberalism Agrarianism
- Mother party: Centre Party
- International affiliation: International Federation of Liberal Youth (IFLRY)
- European affiliation: European Liberal Youth (LYMEC)
- Nordic affiliation: Nordic Center Youth (NCF)
- Website: cuf.se

The Centre Party Youth (Swedish: Centerpartiets ungdomsförbund [ˈsɛ̂nːtɛrpaˌʈiːɛts ˈɵ̂ŋdʊmsfœrˌbɵnd]; CUF) is the youth organization of the Centre Party in Sweden and is a liberal, green and market liberal organization.

CUF was founded 1919, under the name Swedish Rural Youth League (Svenska Landsbygdens Ungdomsförbund). In 1962 the name was changed to Youth League of the Centre (Centerns Ungdomsförbund) and then in 2004 to its current name.
