= 1921 Swedish general election =

- 10 September 1921

All 230 seats in the Andra kammaren
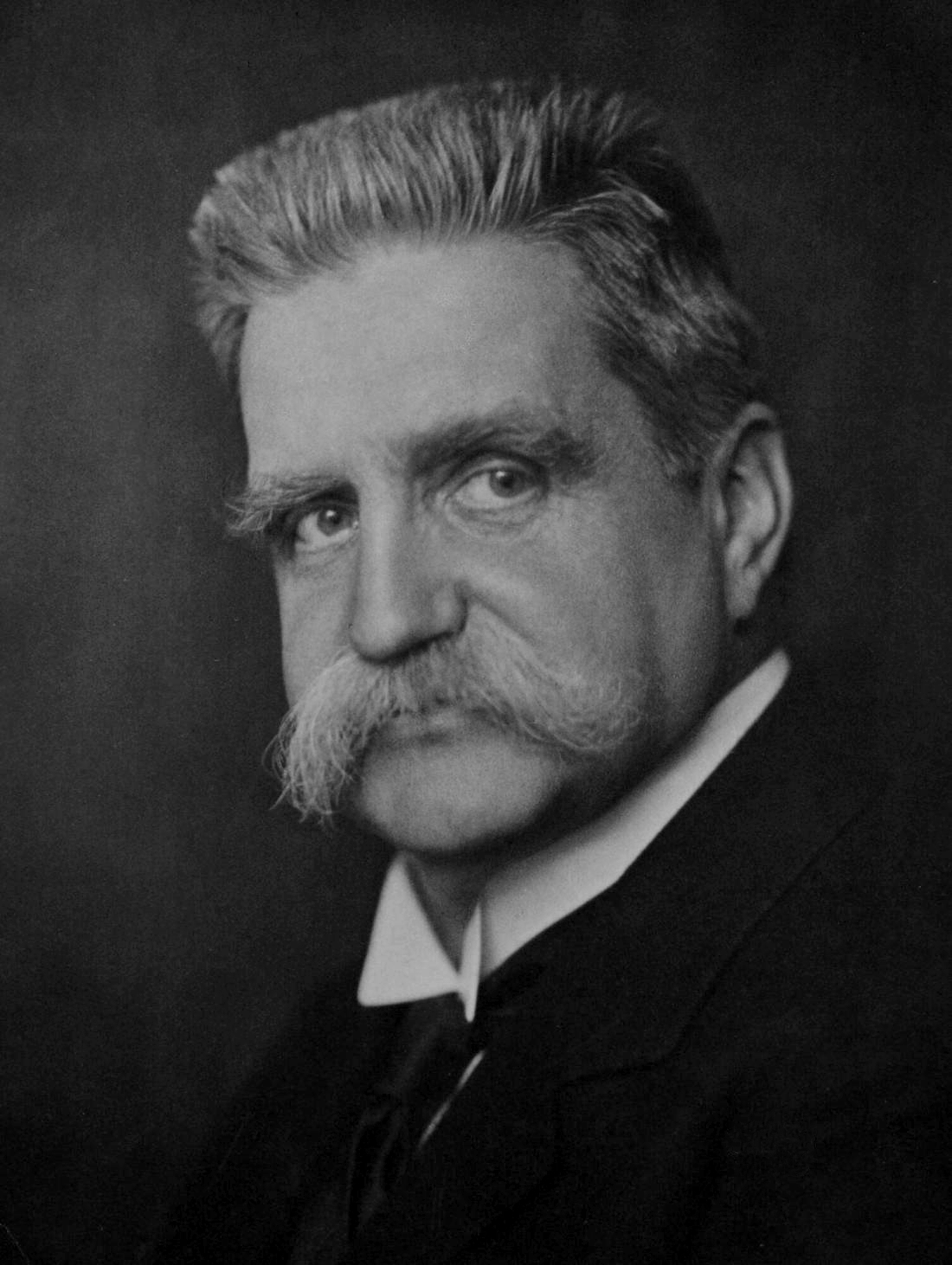

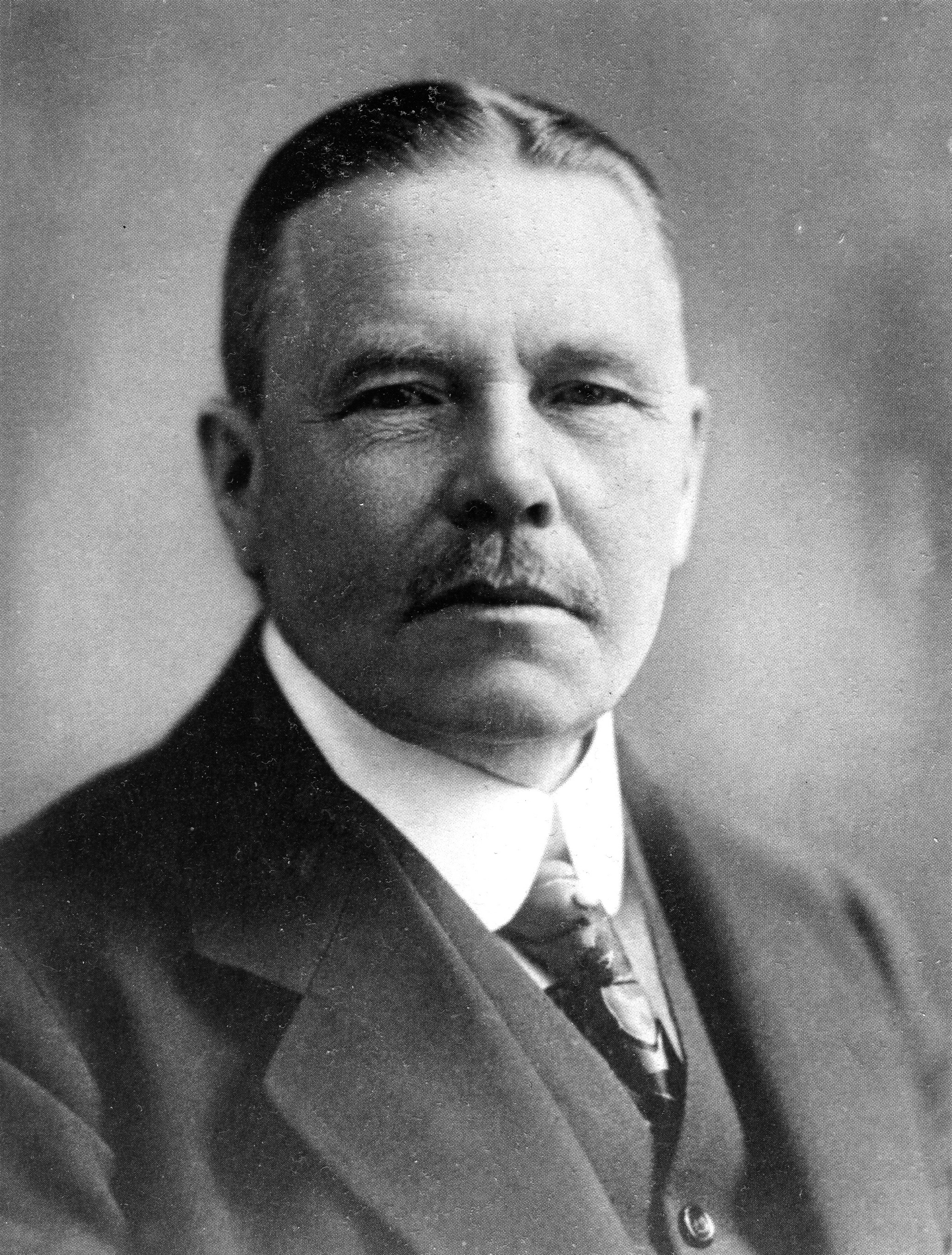

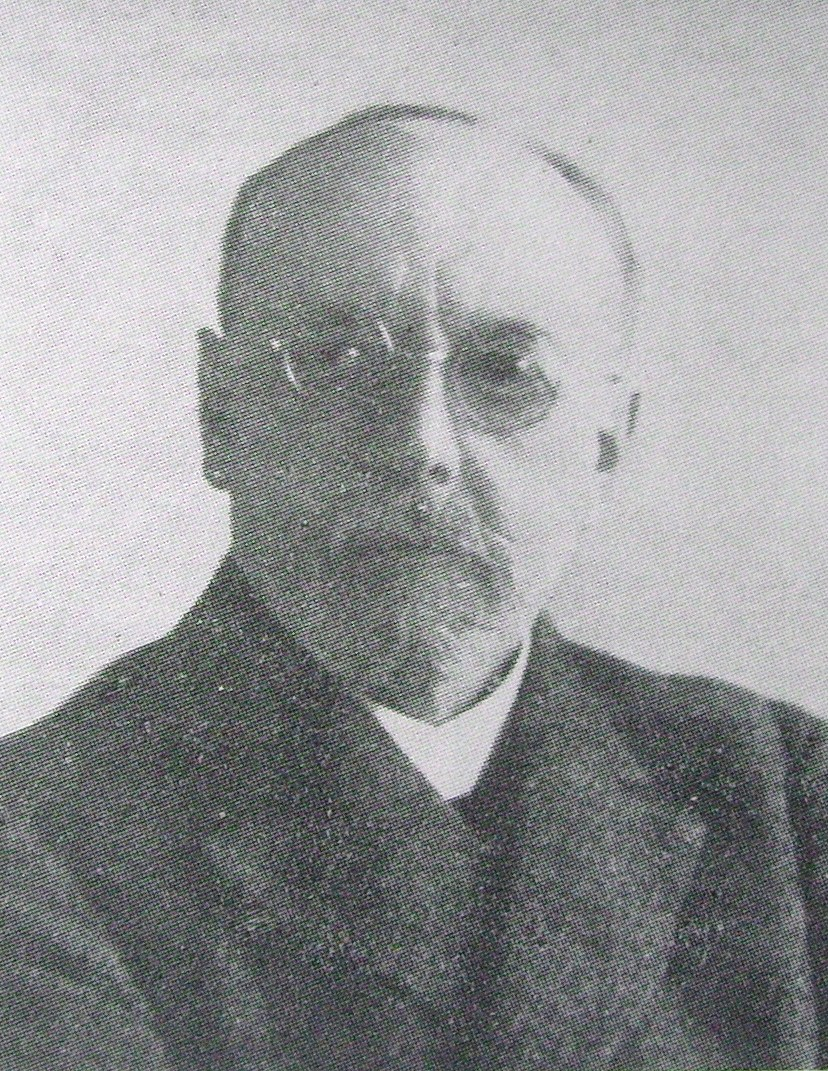

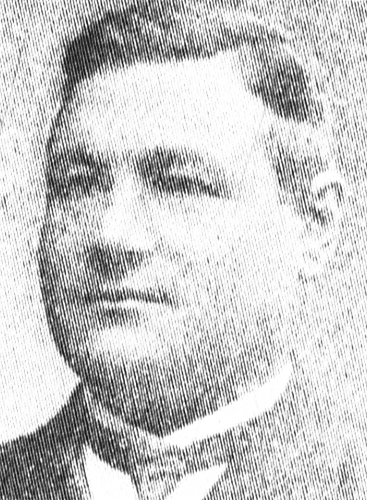

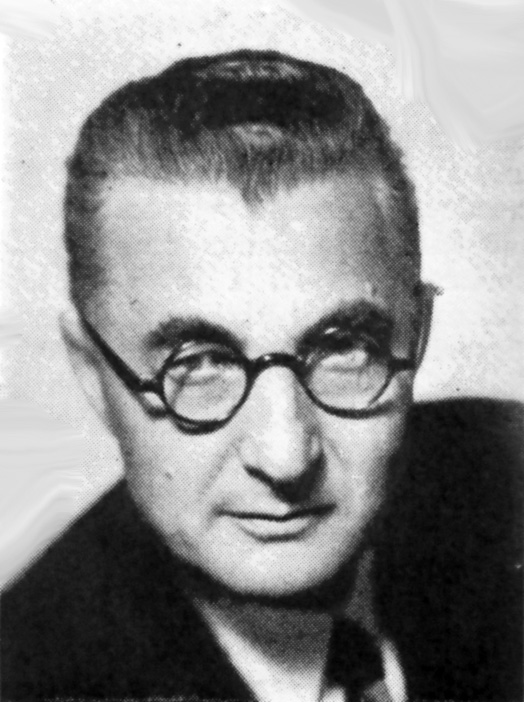

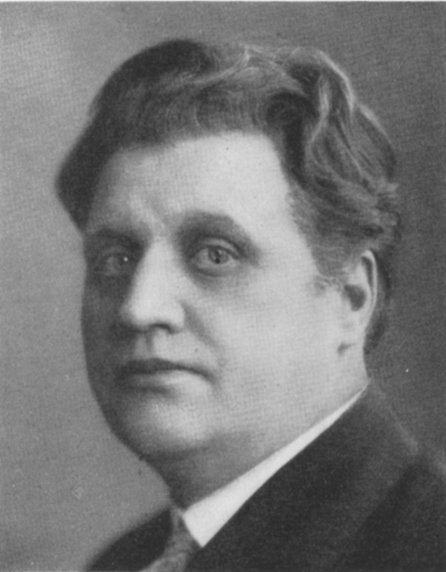
	First party	Second party	Third party
Leader	Hjalmar Branting	Arvid Lindman	Raoul Hamilton
Party	Social Democrats	Electoral League	Free-minded
Last election	75	71	47
Seats won	93	62	41
Seat change	▲18	▼9	▼6
Popular vote	630,855	449,302	325,608
Percentage	36.22%	25.79%	18.69%
	Fourth party	Fifth party	Sixth party
Leader	Johan Andersson	Karl Kilbom	Ivar Vennerström
Party	Farmers' League	Communist	SSV
Last election	30 (Note: Total seats of Farmers' League and Farmers' Association)	7	–
Seats won	21	7	6
Seat change	▼9	Steady	New
Popular vote	192,269	80,355	56,241
Percentage	11.04%	4.61%	3.23%
- Largest bloc and seats won by constituency
Prime Minister before election
Oscar von Sydow
Independent
PM-elect
Hjalmar Branting
Social Democrats

Early general elections were held in Sweden between 10 and 26 September 1921, the first in Sweden under universal suffrage. The Swedish Social Democratic Party remained the largest party, winning 93 of the 230 seats in the Andra kammaren of the Riksdag. Party leader Hjalmar Branting formed his second government.

== Background ==
Before the elections in 1921 the Social Democratic Left Party of Sweden accepted Lenin's April Theses and was renamed the Communist Party of Sweden, whilst a breakaway faction of some 6,000 socialists who had been excluded by the communists as "non-revolutionary elements" kept the previous name.

== Electoral system ==
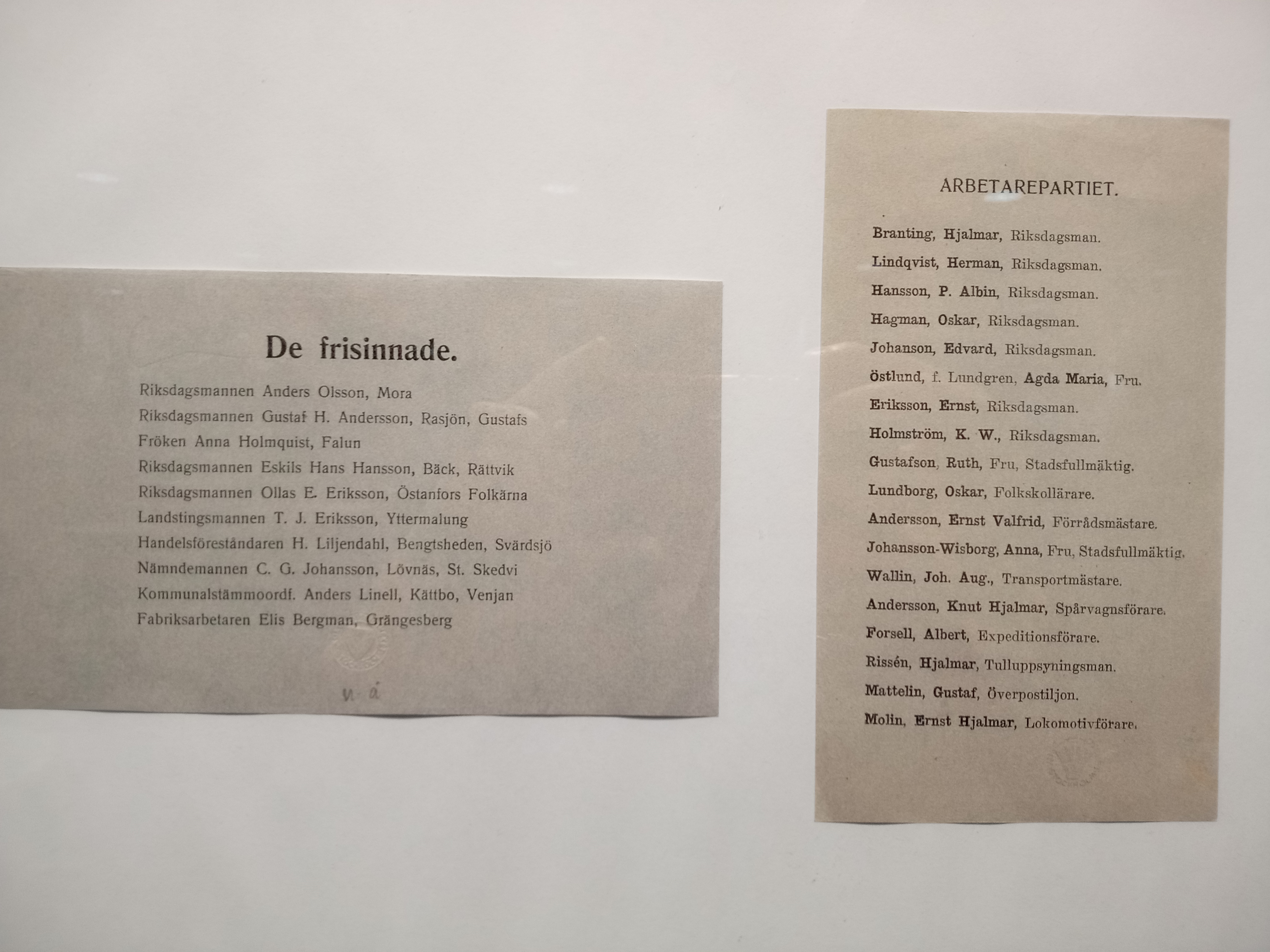
Ballot papers used for election

In 1921 universal suffrage was introduced for men and women, aged 23 and over. However, a significant number of people were still unable to vote, including those who had been declared incapable of managing their own affairs by a court of law. This limitation of the franchise disappeared only in 1989 when the Riksdag abolished incapacitation. In the 1921 elections incapacitation meant that only 55% of the population could vote.

== Results ==
The five first women MPs were elected, with Kerstin Hesselgren in the Första kammaren and Nelly Thüring (Social Democrat), Agda Östlund (Social Democrat) Elisabeth Tamm (liberal) and Bertha Wellin (Conservative) in the Andra kammaren.

Party	Votes	%	Seats	+/–
Swedish Social Democratic Party	630,855	36.22	93	+18
General Electoral League	449,302	25.79	62	–9
Free-minded National Association	325,608	18.69	41	–6
Farmers' League	192,269	11.04	21	–9
Communist Party	80,355	4.61	7	0
Social Democratic Left Party	56,241	3.23	6	New
Other parties	7,322	0.42	0	0
Total	1,741,952	100.00	230	0
Valid votes	1,741,952	99.68		
Invalid/blank votes	5,601	0.32		
Total votes	1,747,553	100.00		
Registered voters/turnout	3,222,917	54.22		
Source: Nohlen & Stöver

== Aftermath ==
As a result of the election Prime Minister Oscar von Sydow resigned and was replaced by Hjalmar Branting who also became Foreign Minister of Sweden. Although the non-socialist parties held a majority in the second chamber, Branting was able to hold office through being the largest party and reaching cross-ideological consensus in the chamber. The centre-right majority took over the governing in 1923 under Ernst Trygger following a parliamentary loss for the Social Democrats over unemployment protection.

Alongside the universal franchise reform, a parliamentary system of government developed and gained acceptance, implying that the government requires the Riksdag's confidence and support for all major decisions. From 1921 all major treaties with foreign states had to be approved by the Riksdag, and the two chambers of the Riksdag now elected their own Speakers along with two deputy speakers each.
