= Karlstrom =

Karlstrom may refer to:

- Karlström
- Karlstrøm
