= 2026 Swedish government formation =

Formation of Swedish government

- Date: 13 September 2026–Present (70 days)
- Type: Parliamentary government formation
- Cause: 2026 Swedish general election
- Participants: Social Democrats (S); Moderate Party (M); Sweden Democrats (SD); Left Party (V); Centre Party (C); Christian Democrats (KD); Green Party (MP); Liberals (L)
- Outcome: Not yet determined

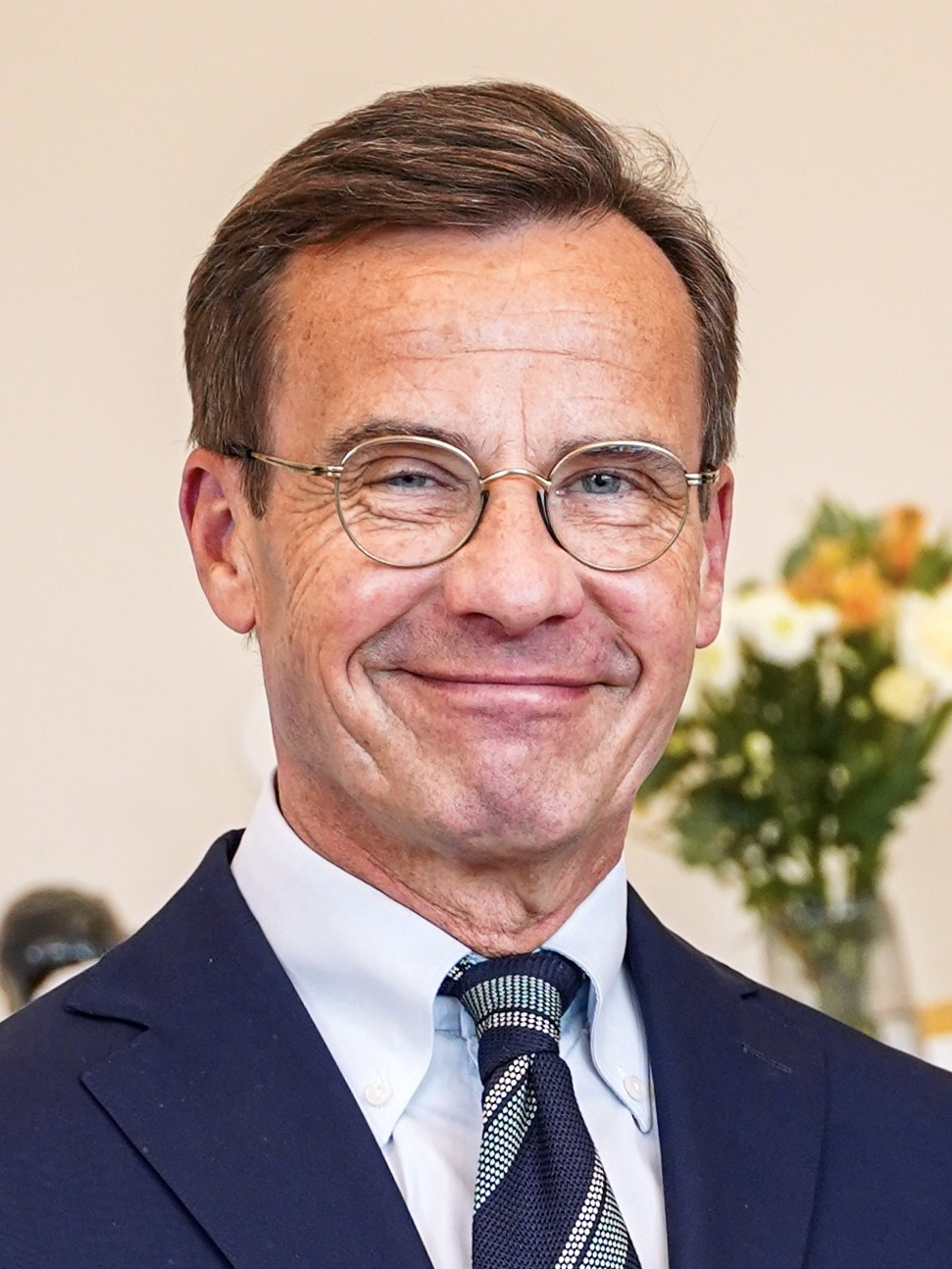
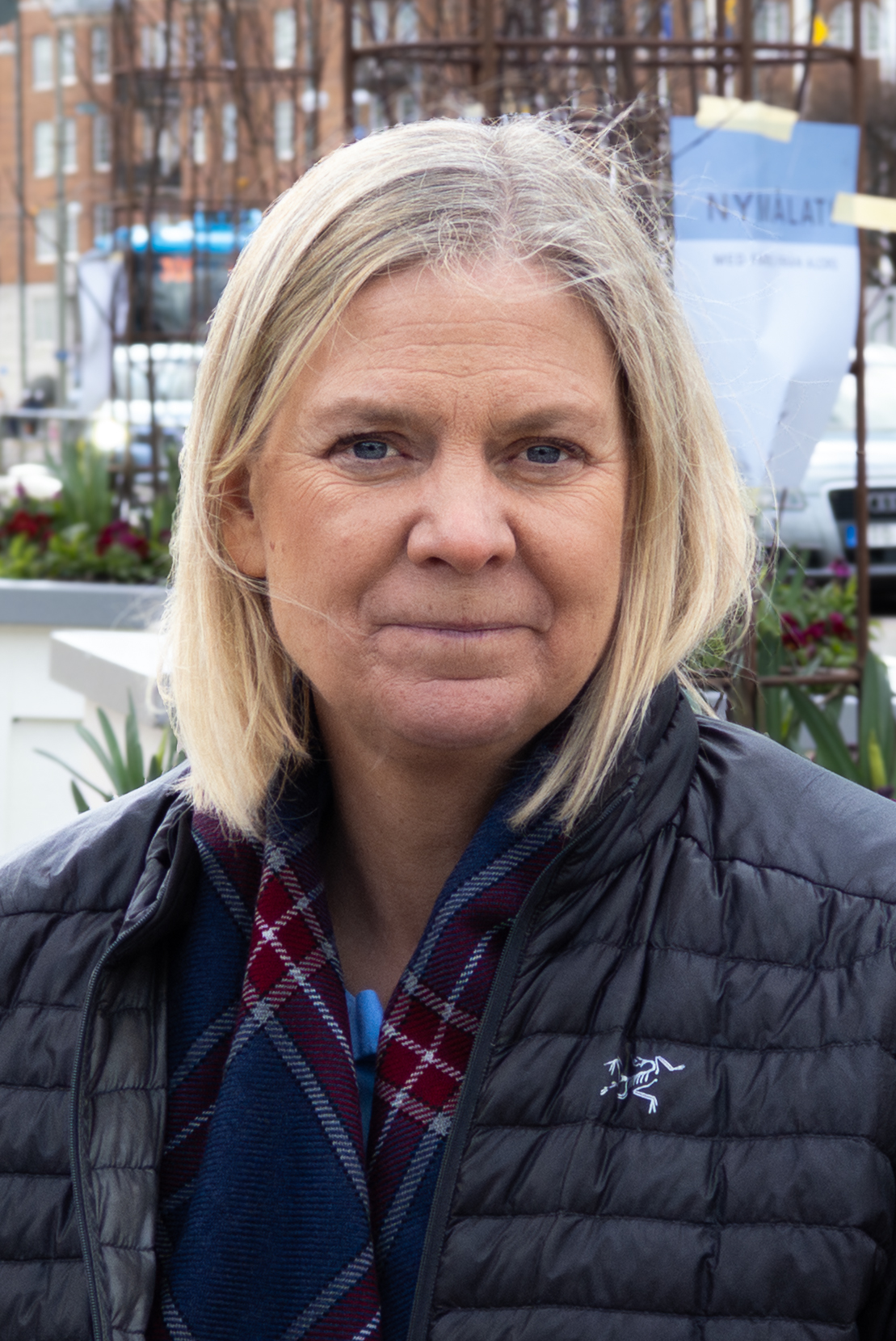
Ulf Kristersson (M) and Magdalena Andersson (S), the two most likely candidates for Prime Minister and leaders of their respective blocs.

In the 2026 Swedish general election, no political group or party won an outright majority, resulting in a hung parliament. The left-wing to centre-right opposition parties (S, V, C, MP) won a narrow parliamentary majority, securing 176 of the Riksdag's 349 seats, compared with 173 for the centre-right to far-right Tidö parties (M, SD, KD, L). Following the result, Prime Minister Ulf Kristersson (M) announced his resignation and Social Democratic Party leader Magdalena Andersson began negotiations with the opposition parties over the formation of a new government. However, initial negotiations were not successful.

== Constitutional context ==
On 17 September, with the 2026 Swedish general election vote count completed, Prime Minister Ulf Kristersson (M) announced that he had handed in his resignation to the speaker to allow the process of forming a new government to begin, with his government assuming a care-taker role pending the completion of the process. The next day, on 18 September, Speaker Andreas Norlén formally gave Magdalena Andersson (S) the assignment of forming a new government.

Within two weeks of the 28 September convening of the newly-elected Riksdag, or by 12 October, the Swedish constitution required a vote on whether the sitting Prime Minister had sufficient support, but the need for this vote was eliminated by Kristersson's 17 September request to be discharged from the office.

The Swedish constitution creates a system known as "negative parliamentarism", wherein "a prime ministerial candidate does not need to have the support of a majority, they only need to show that they do not have a majority of parliament against them." In other words, the vote of confidence in Sweden is in practice a vote of no confidence, wherein the burden of proof is on the opposition. Political parties can symbolically "abstain" from the vote, which in practice acts as a yes vote and shows that the party tolerates, or tacitly approves, a government formation without the obligations that come with outright support.

== Parliamentary situation ==
=== Distribution of seats in the Riksdag ===
The table below lists parties' representation in the Riksdag, Sweden's parliament, as of the 2026 general election.

Name		Leader	Seats
S	Social Democrats; Socialdemokraterna	Magdalena Andersson	99
M	Moderate Party; Moderaterna	Ulf Kristersson	70
SD	Sweden Democrats; Sverigedemokraterna	Jimmie Åkesson	62
V	Left Party; Vänsterpartiet	Nooshi Dadgostar	30
C	Centre Party; Centerpartiet	Elisabeth Thand Ringqvist	25
KD	Christian Democrats; Kristdemokraterna	Ebba Busch	22
MP	Green Party; Miljöpartiet	Amanda Lind; Daniel Helldén	22
L	Liberals; Liberalerna	Simona Mohamsson	19

=== Potential governments and reasons for parliamentary deadlock ===
Potential governments	Seats
Total seats in the Riksdag	349
Governments with a majority (175 or more seats)
M–SD–C–KD–L	198
S–C–KD–MP–L	187
S–V–C–MP	176
Governments without a majority (174 or fewer seats)
S–M	169
S–C–MP	146
M–C–KD–L	136

- M–SD–C–KD–L ("non-socialist government"): Proposed government by M, however, C has Andersson (S) as their prime minister candidate and is against SD having any influence over politics.
  - Alternatively M–C–KD–L ("Alliance government" or "bourgeois government") with external support from S and/or SD: Preferred government by M, SD, KD, and L, however, S does not want to collaborate with this government alternative and C's red line against SD having political influence remains.
- S–C–KD–MP–L ("centrist government"): Preferred government by C, however, MP does not want to collaborate with KD and KD and L have Kristersson (M) as their prime minister candidate.
- S–V–C–MP ("red-green government"): All have Andersson (S) as their prime minister candidate. S, V, and MP all demand cabinet positions. Preferred government by V and MP, however, C is against V having cabinet positions.
  - Alternatively S–C–MP with external collaboration with V: Proposed government by S and accepted by C and MP, however, V's demand for being included in a government remains.
- S–M together with one or more parties, or with external support from one or more parties: Proposed government by S, however, M does not want to govern together with S.

== Formation process ==
=== First Social Democrat government formation attempt ===
Following Prime Minister Kristersson's (M) resignation on 17 September, Aftonbladet sources reported that the Centre Party only saw two options for a government, one consisting of themselves, the Social Democrats and the Green Party, supported by the Left Party, who would be given service positions in the government chancellery in exchange, and one consisting solely of the Social Democrats. Ida Gabrielsson, vice-leader of the Left Party, commented on the reports, referring to the single-party alternative as unrealistic and calling for talks to form a government including all four opposition parties. That evening, Svenska Dagbladet sources reported that the Centre Party had declined an invitation by Magdalena Andersson to four-party talks, being unwilling to participate until the Left Party dropped their demand to be included in a government. On 18 September, Speaker Andreas Norlén formally gave Social Democrat leader Magdalena Andersson the assignment of forming a new government. On 20 September, Gabrielsson stated in an interview that the Left Party was prepared to stand firm in their demand to be included in the government.

=== Speaker election ===
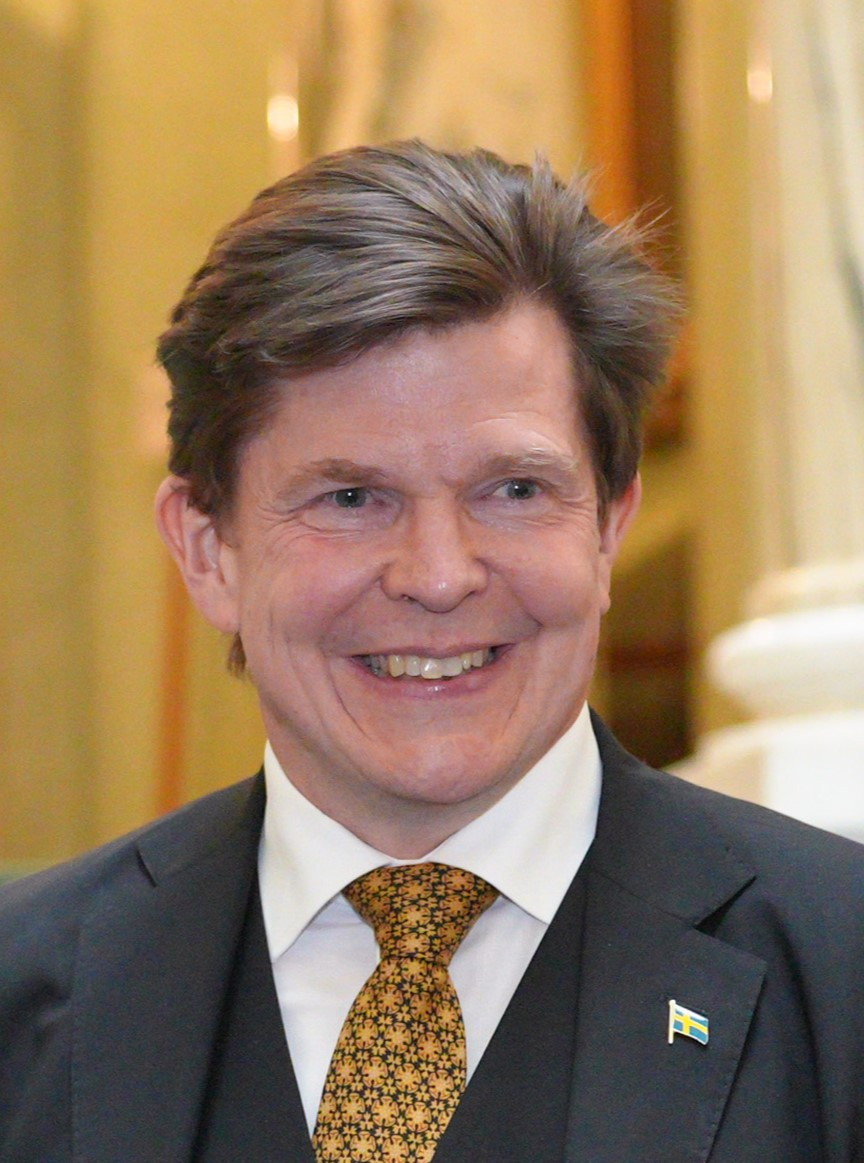
Andreas Norlén.

After Magdalena Andersson (S) was tasked with forming a new government, a week passed by without any success in beginning talks. A new mandate period began on 28 September, and the election of a speaker and vice-speakers were also held on that day. The Social Democrats sought to have Johanna Haraldsson of their party become speaker, which received the support of the Green Party and the Centre Party; however, the Left Party supported Andreas Norlén of the Moderate Party, who had held the position since 2018. The Left Party stated that they had confidence in Norlén personally and in his ability to handle government formation talks, and that they believed it would grant stability and that he would be able to act as a neutral outside voice during negotiations between the opposition parties. With support from the Moderate Party, Sweden Democrats, Left Party, Christian Democrats, and Liberals, Norlén was re-elected as speaker.

Ballot →	28 September 2026
Required majority →	175 (including abstentions) out of 349
Andreas Norlén: • M; • SD; • V; • KD; • L	200 / 349
Johanna Haraldsson: • S; • C; • MP	146 / 349
Abstentions: • N/A	1 / 349
Absentees: • N/A	2 / 349
Result →	Andreas Norlén elected

==== Aftermath ====
Andersson responded to the Left Party's decision by returning to the speaker the task of government formation unfulfilled, stating that she saw no possibility of forming a government as things stood. The Green Party stated that the Left Party's decision would make government formation more difficult, and that they were "disappointed". Social Democrats parliamentary group leader Lena Hallengren stated that the Left Party's decision was a "betrayal". Centre Party leader Elisabeth Thand Ringqvist accused the Left Party of violating an agreement between the opposition parties to jointly nominate one of the Social Democrats as speaker, while the Green Party stated there had been discussions but no agreement. Left Party vice-leader Ida Gabrielsson denied that her party had entered into any agreement, calling the situation "the most dishonest theatre" she had ever experienced. The Left Party also reaffirmed that they wanted to see an Andersson-led government.

After being re-elected as Speaker, Norlén called the party leaders to a new series of one-on-one meetings on 30 September to discuss government formation. (Note: Magdalena Andersson was not invited as she had already spoken with Norlén when she returned the task of government formation.) The Social Democrats, the Centre Party and the Green Party stated that Ulf Kristersson should be given the task of government formation. Kristersson had the day before stated that it is up to the Speaker to test where the parliamentary majority lies, and that he would be ready to form a government if the parliamentary prerequisites to do so were there, but also commented "last I checked there were four parties proclaiming victory on election night, so that is where the parliamentary prerequisites should exist". The Liberals, the Christian Democrats and the Sweden Democrats stated that Andersson should face a Riksdag vote on becoming prime minister.

=== Second Social Democrat government formation attempt ===
On 2 October, Speaker Norlén again nominated Social Democrat leader Magdalena Andersson to attempt to form a government, and requested her to report to him by 12 October. On 11 October, Norlén extended Andersson's deadline to 13 October. On 13 October, Andersson held a press conference stating that she could not form a government and a vote in the Riksdag would only concern a purely Social Democratic government, later that day Norlén proposed a vote in the Riksdag the next day, concerning a purely Social Democratic government, Norlén also annouced that he would not hold any more speaker's rounds to speed up the process, and to avoid a repeat of 2018.

==== First Riksdag vote ====
The Green Party and Left Party reiterated that they would not vote for a government they were not included in. Left Party vice-leader Ida Gabrielsson even proposed Centre Party leader Elisabeth Thand Ringqvist should be given the chance to attempt to form a government. Shortly before the vote, the Centre Party commented that they would also vote against the proposal.

Investiture Magdalena Andersson (Social Democratic)
Ballot →	15 October 2026
Required majority →	175 (including abstentions) out of 349
Yes: • S	99 / 349
No: • M; • SD; • V; • C; • KD; • MP; • L	248 / 349
Abstentions: • None	0 / 349
Absentees: • N/A	2 / 349
Result →	No

==== Aftermath ====
Left Party leader Nooshi Dadgostar proposed Centre Party leader Elisabeth Thand Ringqvist should be given the chance to attempt to form a government.

=== Centre Party government formation attempt ===
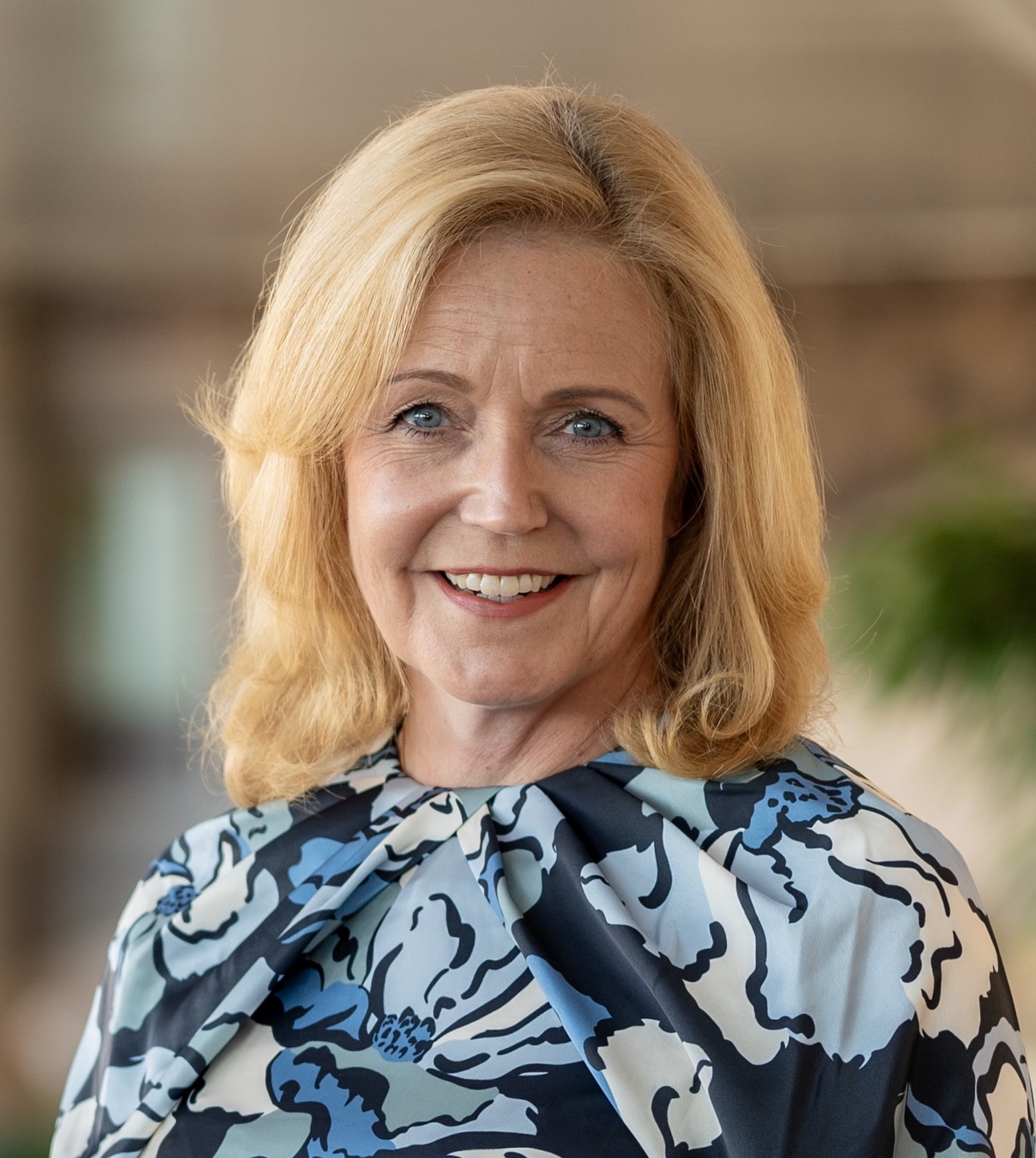
Elisabeth Thand Ringqvist.

On 19 October, Speaker Norlén nominated Centre Party leader Elisabeth Thand Ringqvist to attempt to form a government, and requested her to report to him by 26 October. Thand Ringqvist accepted it, but stated that she had no ambitions to become prime minister. Instead, she attempted to bridge gaps between parties’ red lines against working with each other.

On 26 October, Thand Ringqvist gave up her attempt to form a government. She concluded that there was no support for the coalition composition that her party advocated for, but that there also was no support for a "left turn" in Swedish politics. She reiterated her party's red lines against the Left Party and Sweden Democrats.

On 28 October, the Election Authority began planning for a snap election. A snap election would only be called if four successive votes against a Prime Ministerial candidate failed.

On 29 October, media outlet Expressen reported the speaker’s intent to schedule a vote on a Centre Party-led government. Norlén later confirmed this in a press conference and scheduled a vote in the Riksdag for 3 November, on a coalition consisting of the Social Democrats, Centre Party, Christian Democrats, Green Party and Liberals, led by Centre Party leader Elisabeth Thand Ringqvist. There was backlash against his decision, with the Liberals and Christian Democrats immediately voicing their opposition and the Social Democrats and Green Party describing the situation as “remarkable” and pressing for Ulf Kristersson to be given the opportunity to form a government. The Moderate Party reacted by blaming the Social Democratic leader Magdalena Andersson for the impasse, citing her lack of preparation for coalition negotiations during the previous legislative term. The Left Party, however, welcomed the decision, believing it escalated pressure on the Centre Party to accept the Left Party's demand for cabinet positions in a coalition. Norlén decided that if the vote on Thand Rinqvist failed, Kristersson would be given an opportunity.

==== Second Riksdag vote ====
Thand Ringqvist’s proposed coalition was overwhelmingly voted down with 324 voting no and 25 voting yes. Only the Centre Party’s 25 MPs voted yes, with all other parties voting against the proposal.

Investiture Elisabeth Thand Ringqvist (Centre)
Ballot →	3 November 2026
Required majority →	175 (including abstentions) out of 349
Yes: • C	25 / 349
No: • S; • M; • SD; • V; • MP; • KD; • L	324 / 349
Abstentions: • N/A	0 / 349
Absentees: • N/A	0 / 349
Result →	No

==== Aftermath ====
After the vote, Thand Ringqvist reiterated that she would not support or be in a government that includes or collaborates with the Sweden Democrats.

=== Moderate Party government formation attempt ===
On 3 November, after Centre Party leader Elisabeth Thand Ringqvist lost the confidence vote in the Riksdag, Moderate Party leader Ulf Kristersson was given the task to attempt to form a government, and had to report to the speaker by 10 November.

In a press conference on 6 November, Sweden Democrat leader Jimmie Åkesson announced that his party was willing to tolerate a Kristersson-led M–C–KD–L minority government without the need for minister posts. Shortly after, Thand Rinqvist also held a press conference, where she announced a demand from both Magdalena Andersson (S) and Ulf Kristersson for each of them to form a full program on how they meant to approach the government formation, to be presented to the Centre Party on 13 November. The Centre Party still maintained their position on not supporting a government containing the Left Party and neither containing nor relying on support from the Sweden Democrats. Kristersson also held a press conference, where he said that he had been allowed an unspecified amount of extra days for his government formation attempt. Andersson commented that a government led by Kristersson would be fully dependent on the Sweden Democrats and that she would not collaborate or negotiate with an M–C–KD–L government, which she called a second Tidö government. Left Party leader Nooshi Dadgostar stated that it would be a "historic betrayal" from the Centre Party if they switched sides.

On 8 November, Andersson held a press conference proclaiming that she would attempt to form a minority government consisting of the Social Democrats, the Centre Party, and the Green Party, aiming to have a "close cooperation" with the Left Party. Andersson motivated this decision, claiming that she believed it would be the version of a cabinet that had the highest chance of being tolerated by the Riksdag. She also stated that if the Left Party turned down even discussing this option, the only possible government left that would keep the Sweden Democrats out of power was a government consisting of both the Social Democrats and the Moderate Party. Left Party vice-leader Ida Gabrielsson reacted negatively, citing that the S–C–MP government proposal broke the Left Party's demand of being included in a red-green government.

The following days were tumulting. Several anonymous Centre Party sources commented that their party was deeply divided in the choice between Andersson and Kristersson. The Centre Party's Student Wing said that the centrist option was dead and that Kristersson was better for their centrist policy compared to the red-greens, without fully ruling out working with Andersson. The Swedish Trade Union Confederation entered the discussion and urged the Left Party to drop their demand for ministerial posts to prevent Kristersson from being re-elected. Centre Party parliamentary leader Daniel Bäckström clarified that the Centre Party's stance on the Sweden Democrats had not changed. Andersson said that things were moving forward in her government formation process and told the speaker that she was ready for a new formal government formation attempt. Åkesson (SD) said that he believed the Sweden Democrats would have influence in a Kristersson-led M–C–KD–L government. Green Party member of the Riksdag Janine Alm Ericson stated that the Green Party was in favour of Andersson's government proposal, although they still preferred an S–V–C–MP majority government. Kristersson's extension of his government formation task was set for 17 November. At least five Centre Party districts openly rejected Kristersson's right-wing alternative, including Uppsala, parts of Stockholm, and Jämtland, the reason for their decision was that a Moderate-led minority government would become too dependent on the Sweden Democrats.

Dadgostar (V) and Gabrielsson (V) held a press conference on 12 November where they urged the Centre Party to accept the Social Democrats' full program, while reiterating their demand to be included in an Andersson-led government. However, Thand Ringqvist (C) wanted the Left Party to drop their demand for ministerial posts. The next day, on 13 November, the Social Democrats and Moderate Party presented their respective full programs to the Centre Party. Andersson's government alternative consisted of the Social Democrats, Centre Party, and Green Party with support from the Left Party, and Kristersson's consisted of the Moderate Party, Centre Party, Christian Democrats, and Liberals with support from the Sweden Democrats. Two days later, on 15 November, Thand Ringqvist said that the Centre Party chose to continue negotiating with Andersson's full program.

On 17 November, Kristersson held a press conference where he requested a break in his government formation attempt as he believed that it was still too early to hold a vote. Shortly after, speaker Norlén also held a press conference, where he agreed with Kristersson and declared a one week break for the formation attempt. Norlén also stated that the next Riksdag vote would not necessarily be about Kristersson, as whoever came to Norlén with a government proposal would get a priority for the next vote. He further said that this government formation would not be allowed to continue over Christmas and New Year, and that by Christmas, the Swedish people should know if Sweden either had a new government or was preparing for a snap election. The next day, on 18 November, Christian Democrat leader Ebba Busch held a press conference where she stated that only Kristersson's full program was complete, and also accused the Social Democrats of blackmailing and threatening the Centre Party into collaborating with them.

Christian Widlund (C), a municipal councilor in Norrköping, said that the Centre Party should remove its red line against the Left Party being included in a government, the first Centre Party elected official to say so. He also said that the Centre Party should close the door completely against Kristersson, who according to him would become dependent on negotiating with the Sweden Democrats. However, Emma Ytterell (C), member of the European Parliament, and Emil Källström (C), former economic-political spokesperson, said that the Centre Party should collaborate rightward in a new Alliance M–C–KD–L government.

=== Interim budget ===
On 12 November, caretaker Minister for Finance Elisabeth Svantesson (M) presented the state budget for 2027. With still no government in place, the budget was an interim budget without party-political priorities.

== See also ==
- 2018–2019 Swedish government formation
- 2021 Swedish government formation
