= 1920 Swedish general election =

- 4 September 1920

All 230 seats in the Andra kammaren
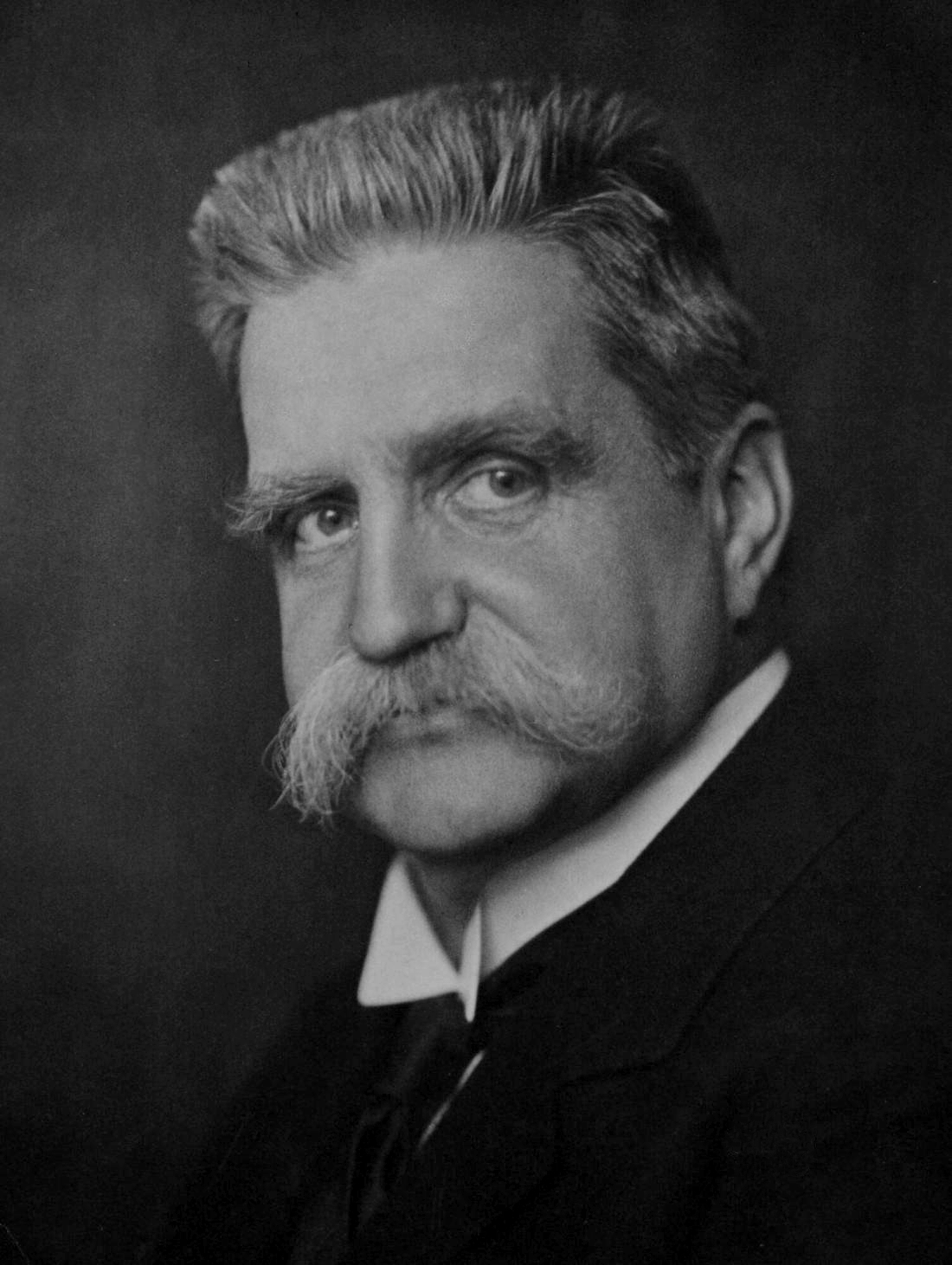

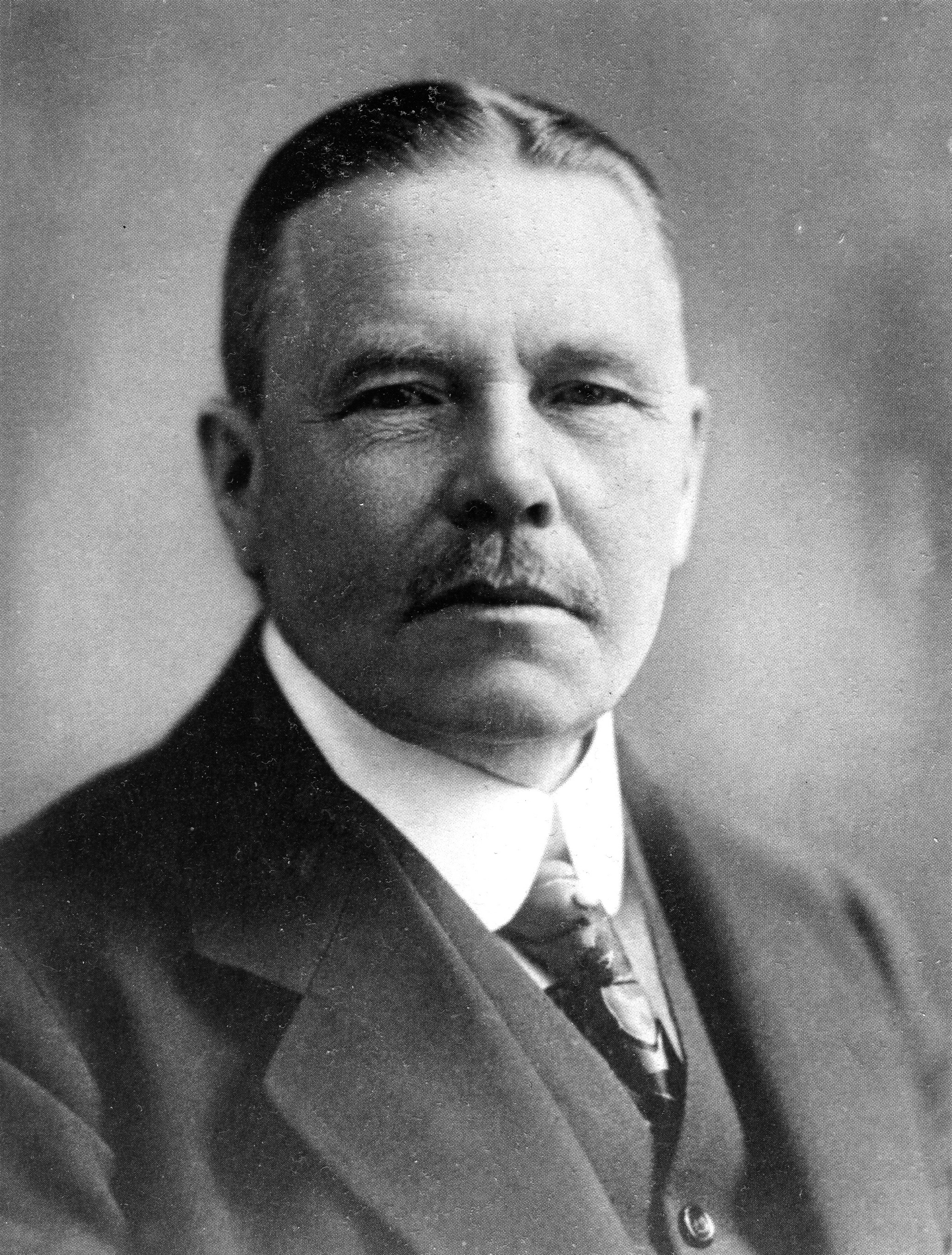

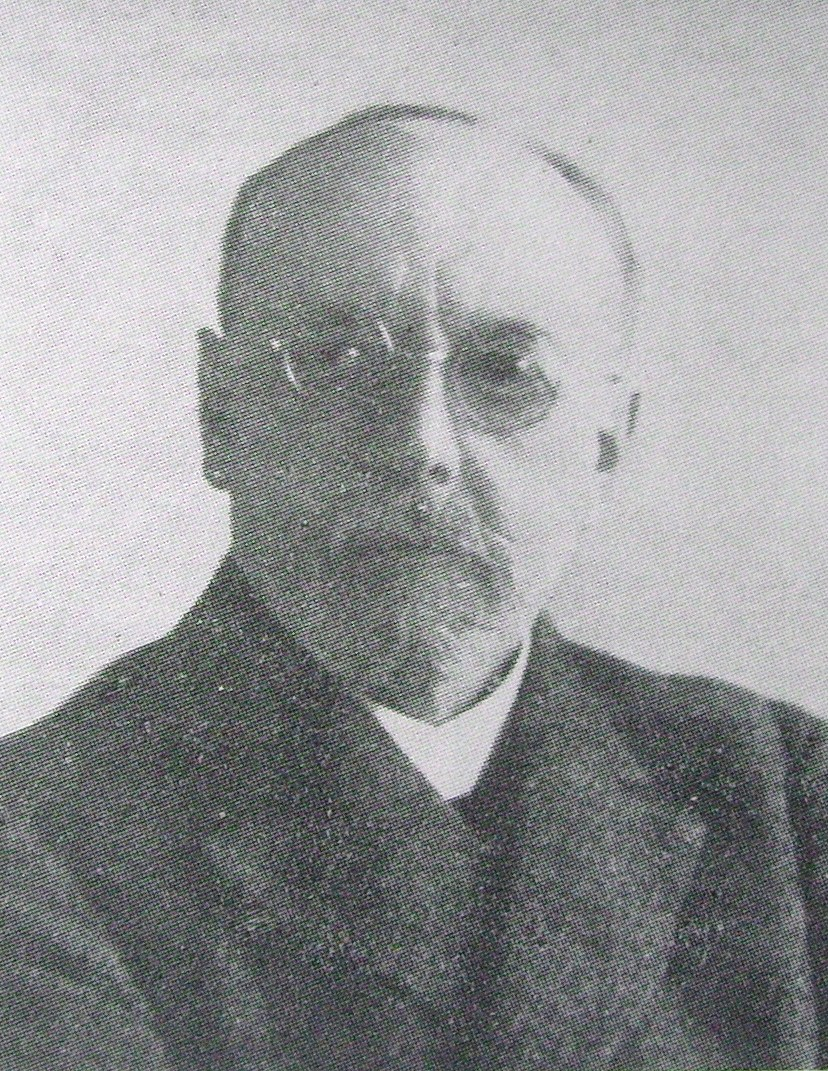

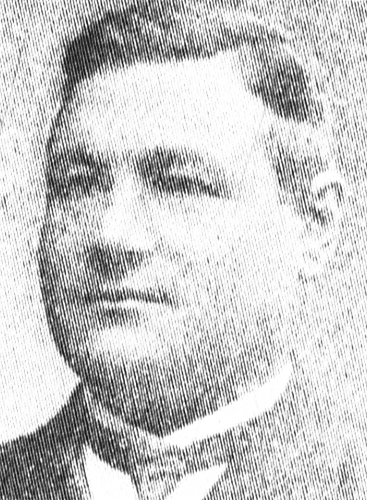

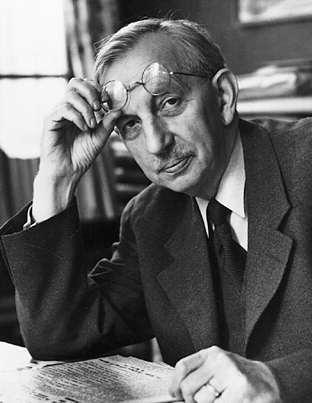
	First party	Second party	Third party
Leader	Hjalmar Branting	Arvid Lindman	Raoul Hamilton
Party	Social Democrats	Electoral League	Free-minded
Last election	86	59	62
Seats won	75	71	47
Seat change	▼11	▲12	▼15
Popular vote	195,121	183,019	143,355
Percentage	29.65%	27.81%	21.78%
	Fourth party	Fifth party	Sixth party
Leader	Johan Andersson		Zeth Höglund
Party	Farmers' League	National Farmers'	SSV
Last election	9	3	11
Seats won	20	10	7
Seat change	▲9	▲5	▼4
Popular vote	52,318	40,623	42,056
Percentage	7.95%	6.17%	6.39%
Prime Minister before election
Hjalmar Branting
Social Democrats
PM-elect
Louis de Geer
Independent

General elections were held in Sweden between 4 and 17 September 1920, the last before universal suffrage was introduced the following year. The Social Democratic Party remained the largest party, winning 75 of the 230 seats in the Andra kammaren of the Riksdag. Later in October 1920 Hjalmar Branting was succeeded as prime minister by Baron Louis De Geer.

== Results ==
Party	Votes	%	Seats	+/–
Swedish Social Democratic Party	195,121	29.65	75	–11
General Electoral League	183,019	27.81	71	+14
Free-minded National Association	143,355	21.78	47	–15
Farmers' League	52,318	7.95	20	+9
Social Democratic Left Party	42,056	6.39	7	–4
National Farmers' Association	40,623	6.17	10	+5
Other parties	1,691	0.26	0	0
Total	658,183	100.00	230	0
Valid votes	658,183	99.70		
Invalid/blank votes	2,011	0.30		
Total votes	660,194	100.00		
Registered voters/turnout	1,192,922	55.34		
Source: Nohlen & Stöver
