= Karin Collin =

Swedish politician

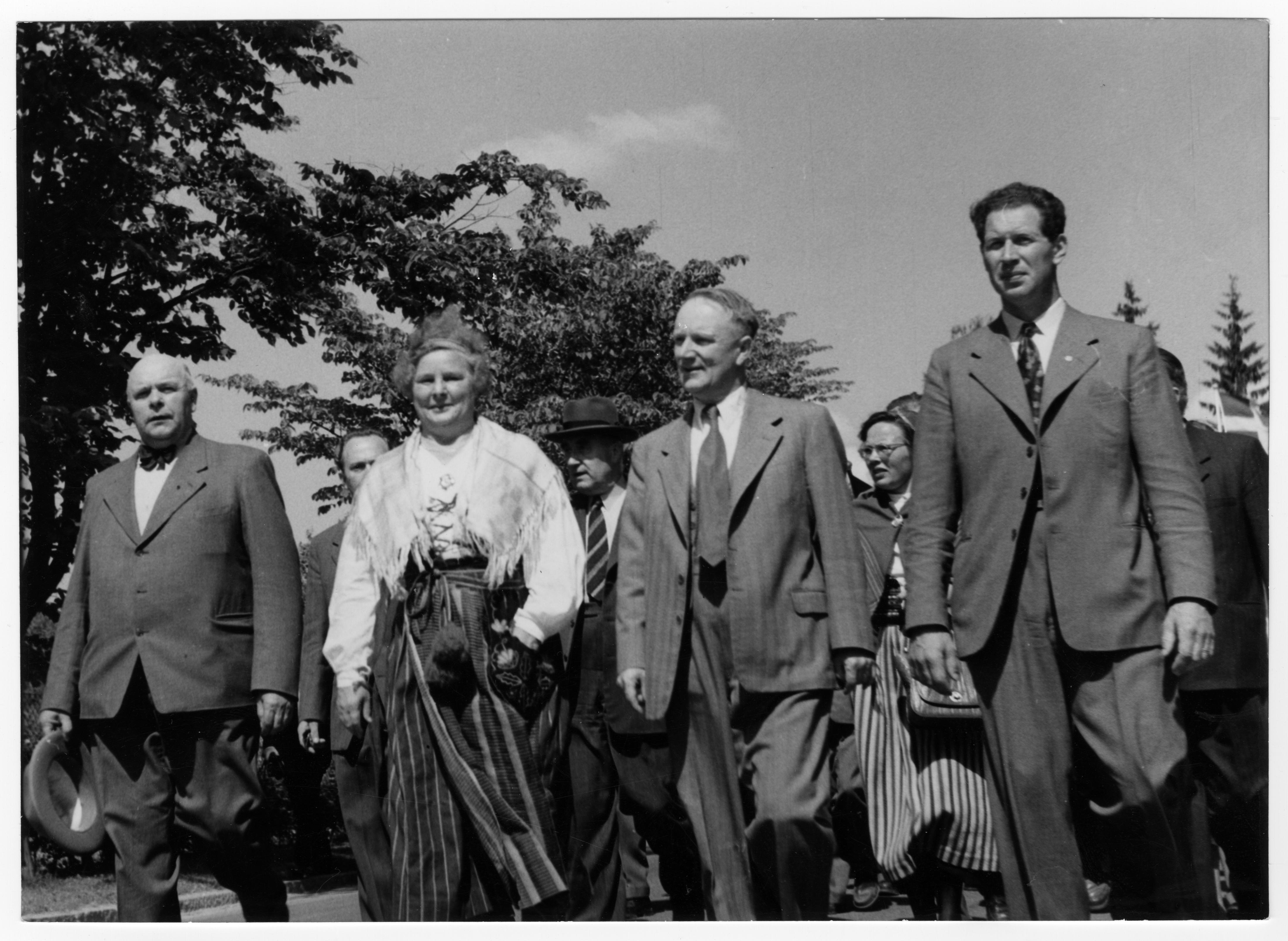
Karin Collin, Gunnar Hedlund, Sam B. Norup and Thorsten Larsson in Katrineholm in 1952.

Karin Collin (1896-1966) was a Swedish politician (Centre Party) and writer.

She was the Chair of the Center women in 1939–1965.

She participated in a number of governmental investigations and commissions, often related to agriculture and health care. She had several political assignments state committees, on county- and on city level, although she did not manage to gather enough votes to get in to the national Parliament.

As a political, she focused on the rights of women in the countryside and worked to improve their circumstances, such as introducing a vacation for farmer women, issues she often lifted as a writer and contributor in her chronicle in the Jordbrukarnas Föreningsblad (Farmer's Association's Magazine) under the signature Unus.
