= Hommel =

Hommel is a German surname. Notable people with the surname include:

- Christian Hommel (born 1981), German ice hockey player
- Conrad Hommel (1883–1971), German painter
- Flora Hommel (1928–2015), American childbirth educator
- Fritz Hommel (1854–1936), German Orientalist
- Jane Franklin Hommel (1878–1946), American clubwoman
- Johann Hommel (1518–1562), German astronomer and mathematician
- Sascha Hommel (born 1990), German motorcycle racer
- Ulrich Hommel, German professor

== Other uses ==
- Hommel (crater), a lunar crater, named for Johann Hommel
- Hummel (instrument) (variant spelling), Northern European box zither
