= Per Gustavsson =

Per Gustafsson or Per Gustavsson may refer to:

- Per Gustafsson Banér (1588-1644), privy councillor of Sweden
- Per Gylle (AKA Per Gustafsson, 1861-1951), Swedish psychiatrist
- Per Gustafsson i Benestad (1880-1942), Swedish politician
- Per Gustavsson (writer) (born 1951), Swedish author
- Per Gustavsson (illustrator) (born 1962), Swedish illustrator and author
- Per M. Gustavsson (born 1965), researcher and advisor
- Per Gustafsson (born 1970), Swedish ice hockey player
