= Hultman =

Hultman is a Swedish surname.

== Geographical distribution ==
As of 2014, 59.5% of all known bearers of the surname Hultman were residents of Sweden (frequency 1:3,059), 35.9% of the United States (1:186,212), 1.1% of Norway (1:82,941) and 1.0% of Finland (1:101,793).

In Sweden, the frequency of the surname was higher than national average (1:3,059) in the following counties:

1. Jönköping County (1:1,427)
2. Östergötland County (1:1,563)
3. Kalmar County (1:1,818)
4. Värmland County (1:1,927)
5. Örebro County (1:2,228)
6. Södermanland County (1:2,234)
7. Västernorrland County (1:2,904)
8. Västra Götaland County (1:2,966)

== People ==
- Calvin Hultman (1941–2017), American politician, son of Oscar
- Emil Hultman (1880–1933), Swedish politician
- Evan Hultman (1925–2025), American politician
- Johan Hultman (1876–1958), Swedish diplomat
- Johannes Alfred Hultman (1861–1942), Swedish evangelist, singer, musician, composer and publisher
- Lars Hultman (born 1960), Swedish physicist
- Oscar Hultman (1887–1969), American politician, father of Calvin
- Torbjörn Hultman (born 1937), Swedish Navy rear admiral
- Vivian Hultman (1903–1987), American football player

== See also ==
- Hultman Aqueduct, an aqueduct in Massachusetts, United States
