= Hannes Hervieu =

Swedish politician (born 1989)

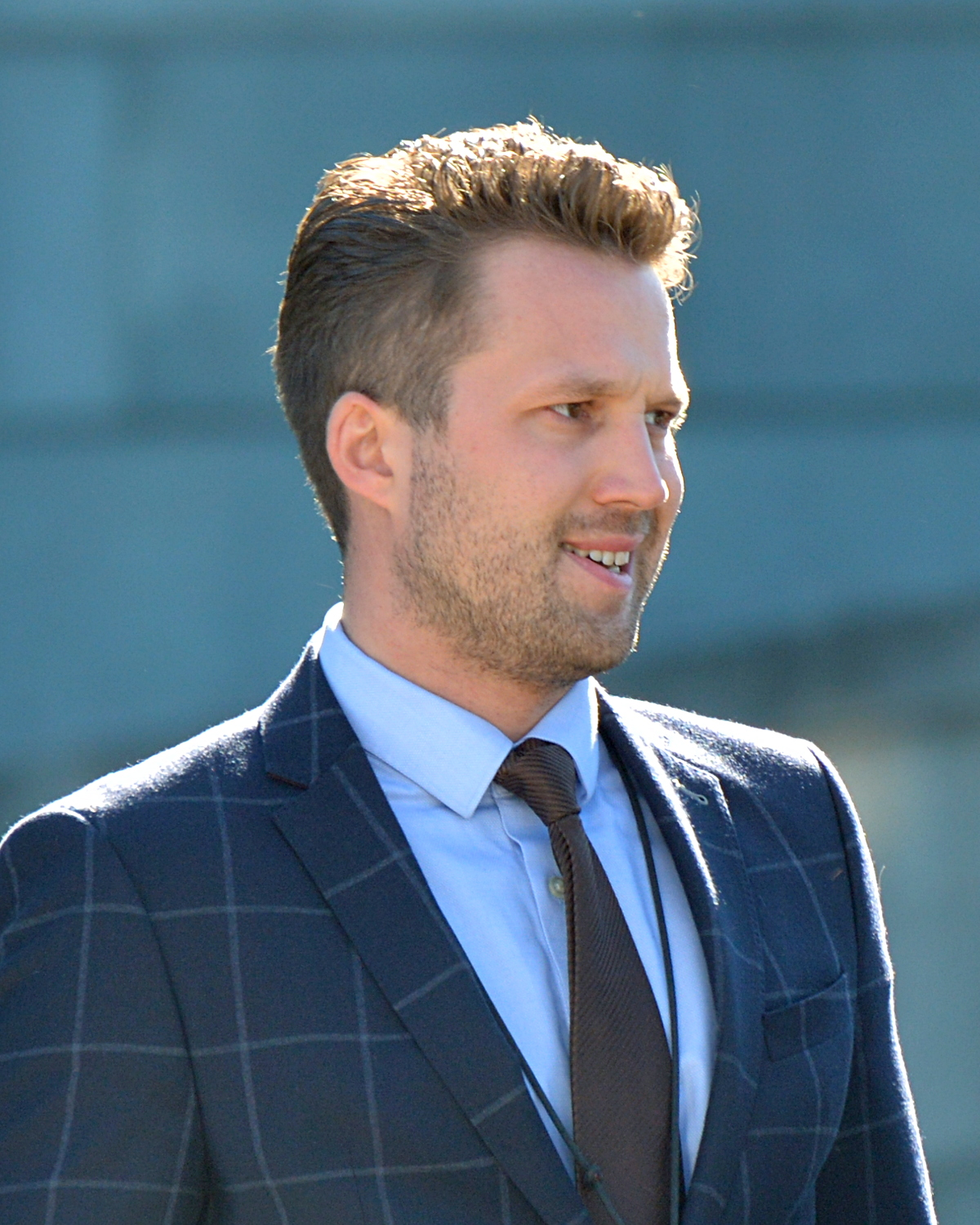
- Hervieu in 2018

Member of the Riksdag
- In office 1 January 2021 – 28 February 2021
- Preceded by: Johan Hedin
- Succeeded by: Johan Hedin
- Constituency: Stockholm Municipality

Personal details
- Born: 9 April 1989 (age 37)
- Party: Centre Party

Karl Hannes Sanh Furuhagen Hervieu (born 9 April 1989) is a Swedish politician of the Centre Party. Since 2025, he has served as the party secretary of the Centre Party.

== Biography ==
Hervieu have been an active member of the Centre Party from his early teenage years. From 2013 to 2015, he served as chairman of Centerstudenter. Parallel to his chairmanship of Centerstudenter, Hervieu began working as campaign manager for the campaign that brought Fredrick Federley into the European Parliament for the Centre Party in the 2014 European Parliament election.

Hervieu ran for the Riksdag in the 2014 general election for the Centre Party. He received 407 personal votes and was elected as a substitute member.

In January 2015, Hervieu began working as press officer and communications strategist for Fredrick Federley and the Centre Party in the European Parliament. In August 2016, he returned to Sweden from his position in Brussels and took up the role of press secretary to Annie Lööf, the party leader for the Centre Party at the time. He held this position until 2019, when he moved to a job in the private sector.

From January to February 2021, he served as a member of the Riksdag covering for Johan Hedin.

In August 2025, Hervieu returned to the Centre Party and became chief of staff to the then party leader Anna-Karin Hatt. In November 2025, Hervieu was appointed party secretary of the Centre Party, shortly after Elisabeth Thand Ringqvist was elected as the new party leader.

=== Personal life ===
Hervieu is married and has two children.
