= Johan Johansson =

Johan Johansson may refer to:

- Johan Johansson (musician) (b. 1961), Swedish musician
- Johan Johansson i Kälkebo (1866–1928), Swedish politician
- Johan Petter Johansson (1853–1943), also known as JP Johansson, Swedish inventor and industrialist
- Johan J. Johansson (1870–1948, American Naval seaman, Medal of Honor recipient
- Jóhann Jóhannsson (1969–2018), Icelandic composer
- Johan Johansson, better known as the Gävle Boy (1663-1676), Swedish child executed during the Katarina witch trials
