= Leijon =

Leijon is a surname. Notable people with this surname include:

== Real people ==
- Anna-Greta Leijon (1939–2024), Swedish politician
- Märta Leijon (1893–1971), Swedish politician

== Fictional characters ==
- Nepeta Leijon, a character in the Homestuck webcomic
