= Aron Gustafsson =

Swedish politician (1880–1963)

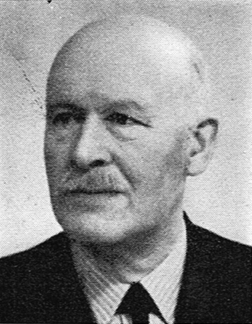
Aron Gustafsson

Aron Gustafsson (25 September 1880 – 20 May 1963) was a Swedish politician who represented the Centre Party.

Gustafsson was born and died in Lekåsa. He was a member of the lower house of the Parliament of Sweden from 1933, elected in the constituency of the former County of Skaraborg.
