= Carl Grewesmühl =

Swedish politician (1877–1950)

Carl Grewesmühl (1877–1950) was a Swedish politician. He was a member of the Centre Party.
