= Arvid Jonsson =

Swedish politician (1886–1960)

Karl Arvid Daniel Jonsson (26 August 1886 in Bäckebo parish - 28 March 1960) was a Swedish farmer and politician. He was a member of Bondeförbundet, now the Centre Party. He was a member of the lower house in the bicameral parliament from 1936, chosen in the constituency of Kalmar County.
