= Erik Grebäck =

Swedish politician (1905–1993)

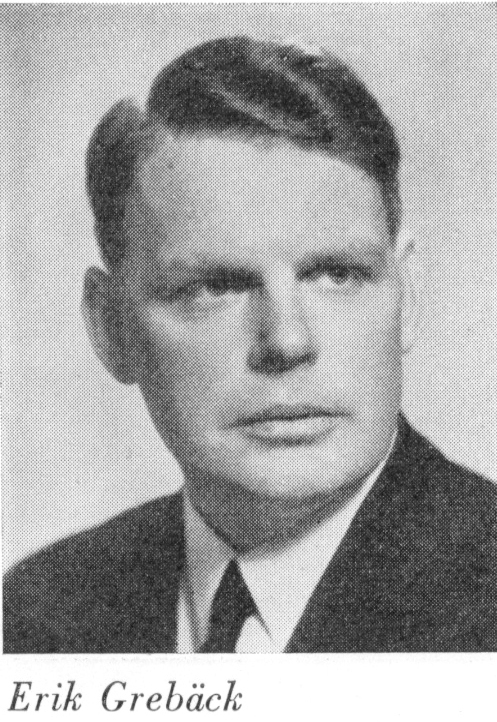
Erik Grebäck SPA

Erik Grebäck (1905–1993) was a Swedish politician. He was a member of the Centre Party.
