= Märta Leijon =

Swedish politician

Märta Leijon (1893-1971) was a Swedish politician (Centre Party) and writer.

She was born to the farmer Anders Svensson and Anna Svensson. She worked as a schoolteacher for a time.

She was active as a writer. She produced both novels as well as articles and instructions about issues related foremost to agriculture. In her novels, she described the life of farmers and the hard work expected from women within the life of farmers.

She was the co-founder and the first Chair of the Center women in 1932–1933.
