= Helmer Johansson =

Swedish politician (1895–1955)

Johan Helmer Johansson (12 April 1895 – 23 July 1955) was a Swedish politician. He was a member of the Farmers' League.

Johansson belonged to the Farmers' League and served as a member of the lower house of the Riksdag during the 1937–1940 term, representing his party in the Västerbotten County constituency. He returned to the Riksdag for a term spanning 1945–1955.

Johansson was found dead at around 2 p.m. on 26 July 1955, lying on the western side of the railway embankment just south of the railway bridge over the Dalälven River at Älvkarleby. The body was lying in tall grass and had therefore been difficult to spot. Some signs indicated that Johansson had been on his way to the toilet when the accident occurred. The police investigation uncovered nothing to suggest that a crime had been committed, and his fall from the train was therefore considered to have been a pure accident.
