= Karlström =

Karlström is a surname. Notable people with the surname include:

- Birgitta Karlström Dorph (born 1939), Swedish diplomat
- Fredrik Karlström (born 1998), Swedish ice hockey player
- Hugo Karlström (1873-?), Swedish politician
- Jesper Karlström (born 1995), Swedish footballer
- Joel Karlström (born 2001), Finnish footballer
- Jonas Karlström (born 1978), Swedish actor
- Marcus Karlström (born 1995), Swedish ice hockey player
- Niklas Karlström, Swedish footballer
- Perseus Karlström (born 1990), Swedish racewalker

== See also ==
- Karlstrøm
