= Gustav Hallagård =

Swedish politician

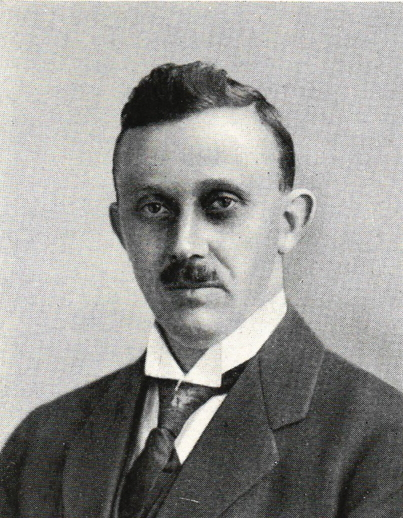

Gustav Hallagård (1887–1967) was a Swedish politician. He was a member of the Centre Party.
