= Centerkvinnorna =

Women wing of the Centre Party, Sweden

Center Women in Sweden
- Centerkvinnorna
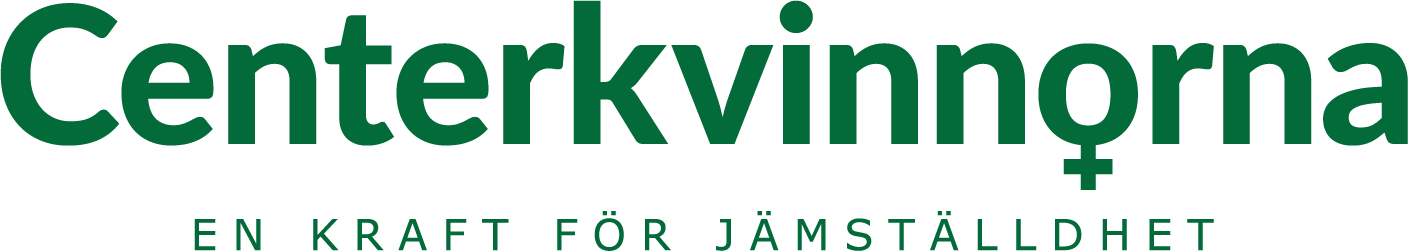
- Formation: 1932
- Type: Women's wing
- Headquarters: Stockholm, Sweden
- Official language: Swedish
- Affiliations: Centre Party (Sweden)
- Website: https://www.centerkvinnorna.se/

The Center Women in Sweden (Swedish: Centerkvinnorna), is the women's wing of the Centre Party (Sweden).

It was established in 1932 under the leadership of Märta Leijon.

== Chairpersons ==
- Märta Leijon, 1932-1933
- Deri Höglund, 1933-1934
- Ingeborg Friberg, 1934-1938
- Karin Collin, 1939-1965
- Sonja Fredgardh, 1966-1979
- Anna Lisa Nilsson, 1979-1981
- Gunnel Jonäng, 1981-1986
- Gunilla André, 1986-1991
- Karin Starrin, 1991-1993
- Ingbritt Irhammar, 1993-1998
- Lena Ek, 1998-2001
- Viviann Gerdin, 2001-2003
- Annika Qarlsson, 2003-2011
- Gunilla Hjelm, 2011-2016
- Sofia Jarl 2016-2022
- Malin Bergman 2022–
