= Emil Gustafson i Vimmerby =

Swedish politician

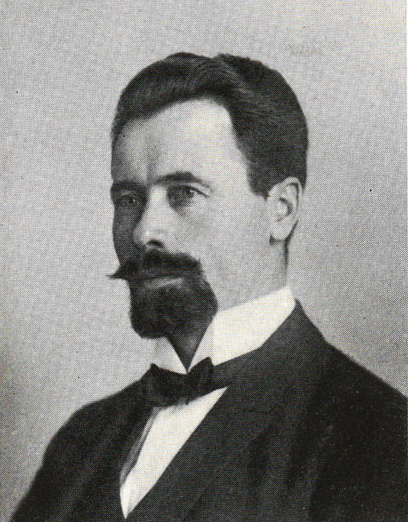

Emil Gustafson i Vimmerby (1887–1976) was a Swedish politician. He was at first a member of the Liberal Coalition Party, then of the Free-minded People's Party, then of the Centre Party.
