= Hudiksvalls Tidning =

Swedish local newspaper

- Type: Local newspaper
- Format: Berliner
- Owner(s): VLT AB
- Founded: 1909; 116 years ago
- Political alignment: Center-right
- Language: Swedish
- Headquarters: Hudiksvall
- Country: Sweden
- ISSN: 1103-940X
- OCLC number: 185289898
- Website: www.helahalsingland.se/hudiksvall

Hudiksvalls Tidning is a Swedish local newspaper published in Hudiksvall, Sweden. It has been in circulation since 1909.

== History and profile ==
Hudiksvalls Tidning was founded in 1909. The paper is based in Hudiksvall. It is close to the Center Party. In 1999 the paper was partially acquired by the Centertidningar AB which was sold to VLT AB in 2005. The paper was published in tabloid format, but later it switched to Berliner format.

In 1998 Hudiksvalls Tidning sold 17,600 copies.
