= Per Jonas Edberg =

Swedish politician (1878–1957)

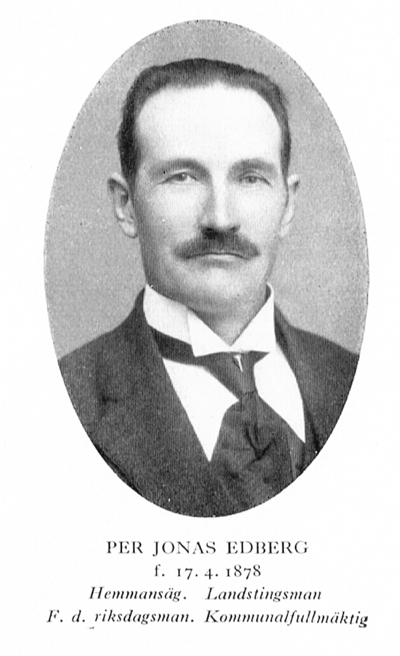
Per Jonas Edberg

Per Jonas Edberg (April 17, 1878 – August 6, 1957) was a Swedish politician. He was a member of the Centre Party and he served in the Parliament of Sweden (lower chamber) 1918–1930, 1929–1932 and from 1945.
