= Gustaf Jonnergård =

Swedish politician

Gustaf Jonnergård (1918–1985) was a Swedish politician. He was a member of the Centre Party.
