= 1917 Swedish general election =

- 1 September 1917

All 230 seats in the Andra kammaren
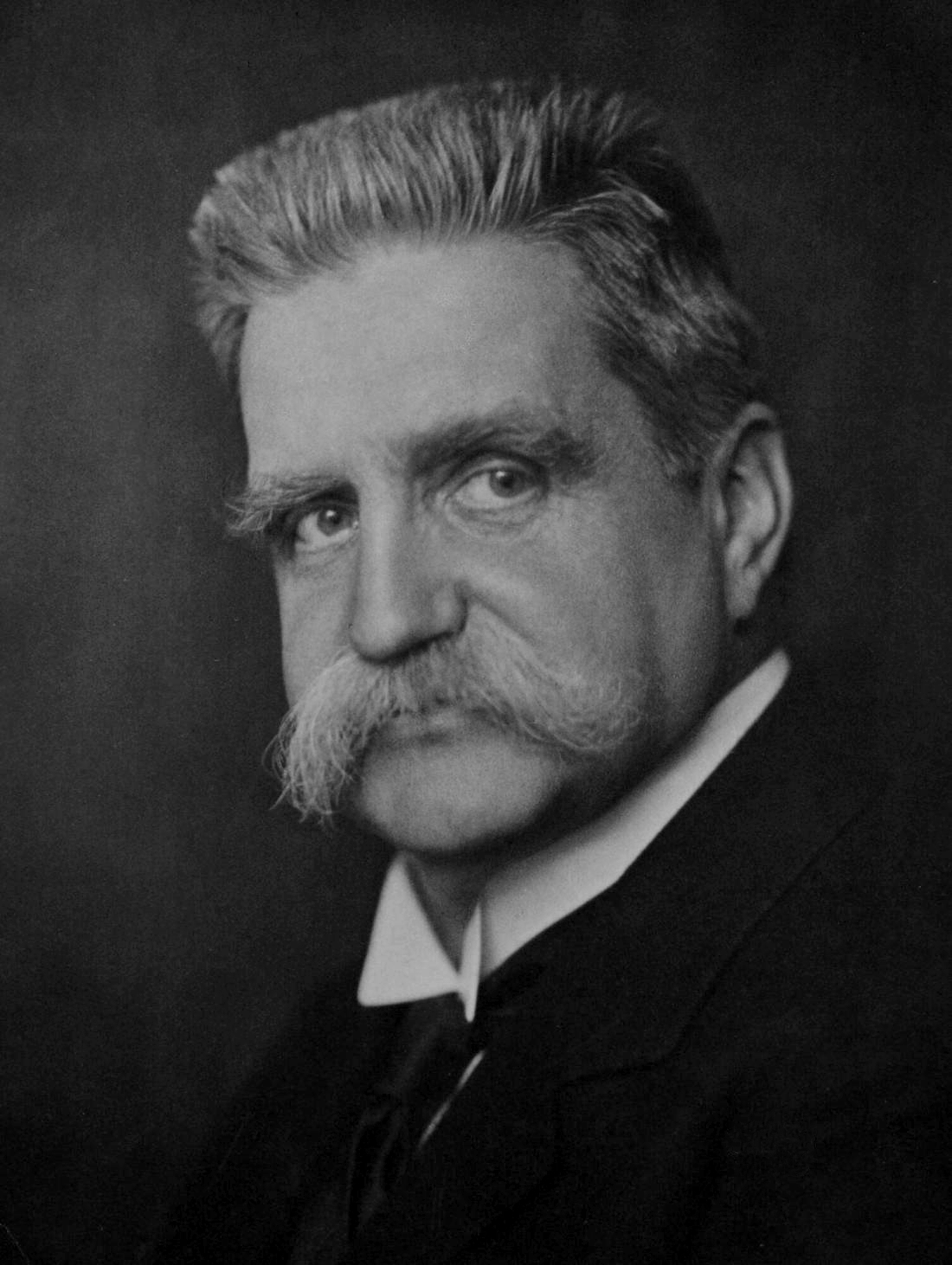

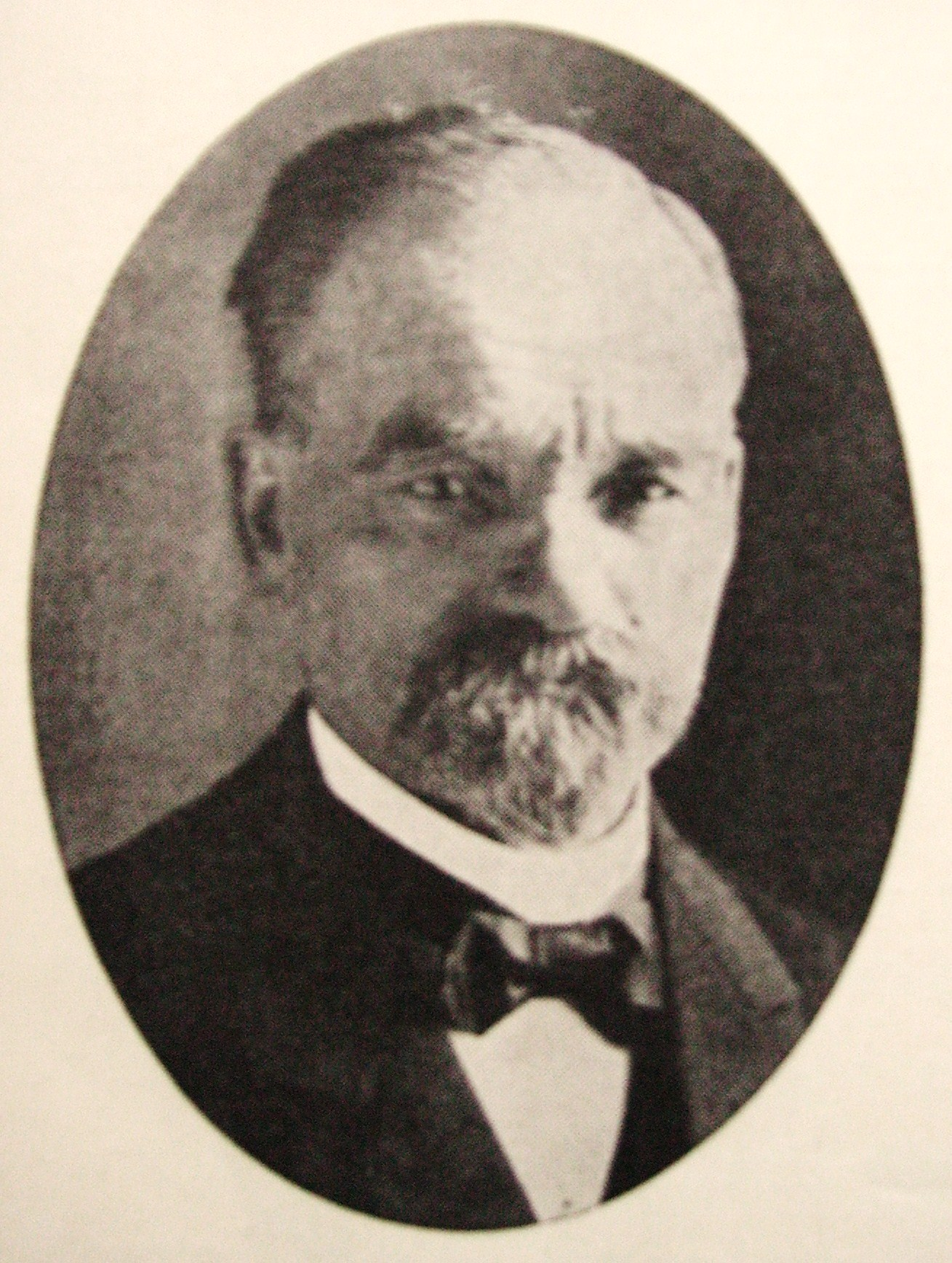

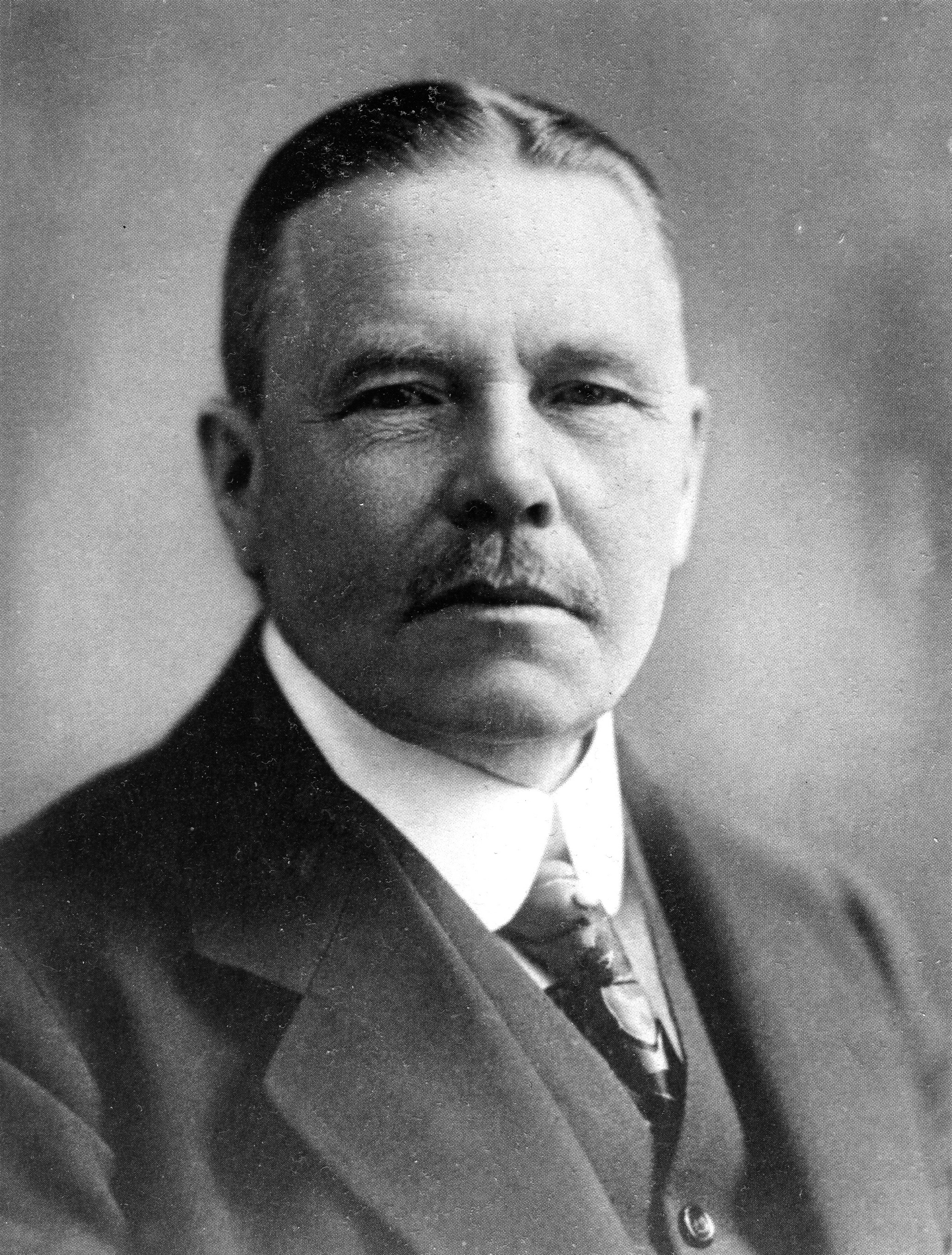

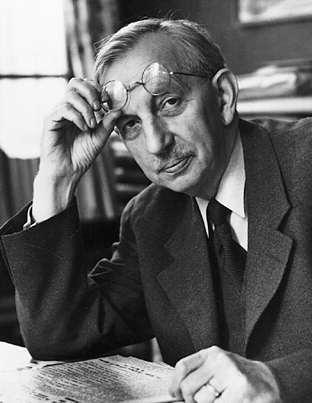

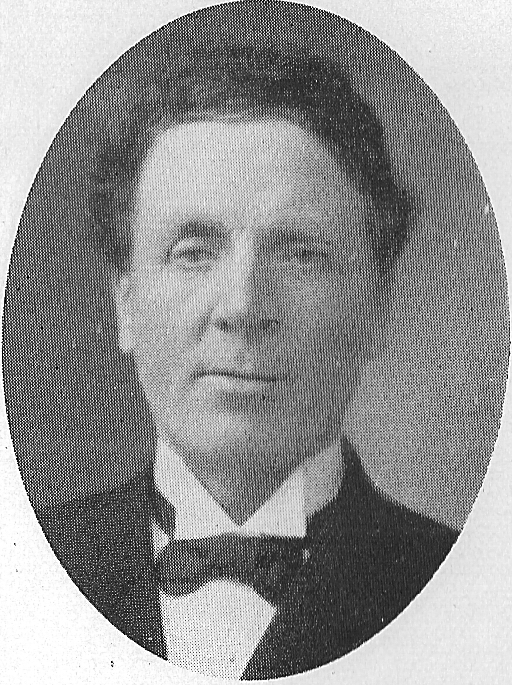
	First party	Second party	Third party
Leader	Hjalmar Branting	Daniel Persson	Arvid Lindman
Party	Social Democrats	Free-minded	Electoral League
Last election	87	57	86
Seats won	86	62	57
Seat change	▼1	▲5	▼27
Popular vote	228,777	202,936	182,070
Percentage	31.08%	27.57%	24.74%
	Fourth party	Fifth party	Sixth party
Leader	Zeth Höglund	Erik Eriksson
Party	SSV	Farmers' League	National Farmers'
Last election	–	0	–
Seats won	11	9	5
Seat change	New	▲9	New
Popular vote	59,243	39,262	22,659
Percentage	8.05%	5.33%	3.08%
Prime Minister before election
Carl Swartz
Electoral League
PM-elect
Nils Edén
Free-minded

General elections were held in Sweden between 1 and 16 September 1917. The Swedish Social Democratic Party remained the largest party, winning 86 of the 230 seats in the Andra kammaren of the Riksdag. As a result the Rightist Prime Minister Carl Swartz resigned the premiership and was replaced by Liberal leader Nils Edén.

== Results ==
Party	Votes	%	Seats	+/–
Swedish Social Democratic Party	228,777	31.08	86	–1
Free-minded National Association	202,936	27.57	62	+5
General Electoral League	182,070	24.74	57	–29
Social Democratic Left Party of Sweden	59,243	8.05	11	New
Farmers' League	39,262	5.33	9	+9
National Farmers' Association	22,659	3.08	5	New
Other parties	1,037	0.14	0	0
Total	735,984	100.00	230	0
Valid votes	735,984	99.59		
Invalid/blank votes	3,066	0.41		
Total votes	739,050	100.00		
Registered voters/turnout	1,123,969	65.75		
Source: Nohlen & Stöver
