= National Agrarian Union =

Swedish political party

The National Agrarian Union (Swedish: Jordbrukarnas riksförbund [ˈjûːɖˌbrʉːkaɳas ˈrɪ̂ksfœrˌbɵnd], abbreviated JR) was a political party in Sweden, one of the fore-runners of the Centre Party.

== History and political platform ==
JR was founded on 6 February 1915, the anniversary of the 1914 Farmers' March. Among the founders of JR were several of the 1914 Farmers' March participants. Soon after the foundation of the party, the Swedish Farmers' League and the Scanian Farmers' League merged into it. Johannes Nilsson i Gårdsby became the party chairman. Vårt land och folk ('Our country and people'), with Elfrid Dürango as its editor, became the party press organ. Member of parliament Nils Johansson i Brånalt became a prominent leader of the party. JR was mainly concentrated in Skåne, Östergötland, as well as to a lesser extent, Värmland and Jämtland.

Compared to the other agrarian party, the Farmers' League, JR was politically further to the right and represented larger estate owners. Later Centre Party historiography has sought to downplay differences between the two parties, but JR and the Farmers' League were rivals for the rural vote. JR had a nationalist outlook with racial overtones (including a fierce opposition to Jewish immigration). Both parties opposed female suffrage and introduction of equal voting rights for local elections (although the Farmers' League revised its policy on local elections by 1918). In the 1917 elections, the Farmers' League won 9 seats and JR 5 seats. After the election, JR began calling for unity between the two parties but the Farmers' League initially resisted the proposition. JR proposed forming a joint parliamentary faction, but after the Farmers' League declined the offer JR established the 'Free Agrarian Group' in the parliament on 17 January 1918, with Olof Olsson i Kullenbergstorp as the chairman of the new parliamentary faction. The two parties merged in 1921, keeping the name of the Farmers' League (which in the 1950s took the name 'Centre Party').
