= Johan Johansson i Kälkebo =

Swedish politician

Johan Johansson, Johan Johansson i Kälkebo, was born 14 September 1866 in Forsa Parish, Hälsingland, Sweden. He died 22 June 1928 in an accident with a train in Flenninge near Bollnäs. He was a Swedish politician, member of the parliament (C) and farmer.
