= Per Gustafsson i Benestad =

Swedish politician

Per Johan Gustafsson (16 October 1880 – 14 April 1942) was a Swedish politician. He was a member of the Centre Party.
