= Hugo Karlström =

Swedish politician

Hugo Karlström (1873-?) was a Swedish politician. He was a member of the Centre Party.
