= Emil Hultman =

Swedish politician (1880–1933)

Emil Hultman (25 December 1880 – 1 August 1933) was a Swedish politician. He was a member of the Centre Party. In 1929, Hultman was a member of the second chamber of the Swedish Riksdag from the Gävleborg county constituency.
