= Olof Olsson i Kullenbergstorp =

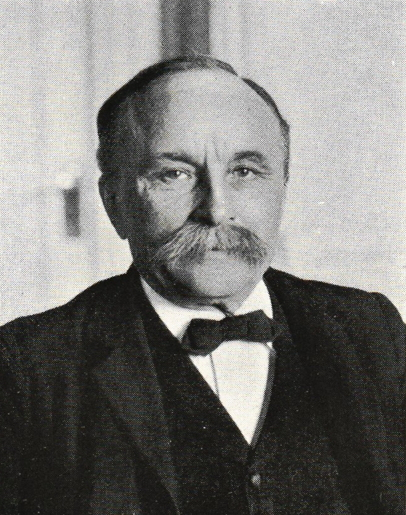

leader of the Farmer's League
- In office 1929–1934
- Succeeded by: Axel Pehrsson-Bramstorp

member of the Second Chamber
- In office 1909–1911, 1918–1934

Personal details
- Born: February 6, 1859; Jonstorp, Sweden
- Died: July 16, 1934
- Political party: Farmer's League

Olof Olsson was born on February 6, 1859, in Jonstorp and died on July 16, 1934. Olof Olsson was a Swedish farmer and politician representing Farmer's League (later renamed the Centre Party). He was the leader of the party.

== Biography ==
Olof Olsson grew up on a farm close to Jonstorp in Småland. He became the leader of the party in 1929. In 1934, shortly before Olsson's death, he was succeeded by Axel Pehrsson-Bramstorp, with whom he had a strained relationship.
