= Karlstrøm =

Karlstrøm is a surname. Notable people with the surname include:

- Åshild Karlstrøm Rundhaug (born 1955), Norwegian politician
- Cornelius Karlstrøm (1897–1978), Norwegian politician
- Jacob Karlstrøm (born 1997), Norwegian footballer
- Randi Karlstrøm (born 1960), Norwegian politician
- Steinar Karlstrøm (born 1965), Norwegian politician

== See also ==
- Karlström
