= Ulrich Hommel =

- Education: Ph.D., Dr. habil
- Alma mater: University of Michigan, Ann Arbor; WHU
- Occupations: Managing Director & Business School Consultant; Professor of Finance
- Employer(s): XOLAS GmbH, Berlin; EBS University of Business and Law

Ulrich Hommel is the Professor of Corporate Finance and Higher Education Finance at EBS University of Business & Law in Wiesbaden, Germany. He is furthermore Founder and Managing Director of XOLAS GmbH in Berlin, Germany, a globally active consultancy company targeting providers of management education (schools/faculties of business/management) as clients.

== Academic qualifications ==
Ulrich Hommel studied economics and political science at the University of Freiburg, Germany. After completing the Bachelor-level exams, he entered the Ph.D. program in economics at The University of Michigan (Ann Arbor) from which he graduated in 1994. In 2002, he successfully completed his post-doctoral qualification in business administration at the WHU – Otto Beisheim School of Management and was awarded a Dr. habil.

== Academic career ==
After completing his doctoral studies, Hommel joined the WHU faculty as an assistant finance professor in 1994. In 2000, he moved on to the European Business School International University, Schloss Reichartshausen), now called EBS University of Business and Law, first as acting professor and then, in 2002, as full professor. During his tenure, he has held visiting appointments at Bordeaux École de Management, Krannert School of Management of Purdue University (delivering courses at their satellite campus in Hannover, Germany), the Stephen M. Ross School of Business of The University of Michigan and Stockholm Business School of Stockholm University.

Hommel's research focuses on the economic value of flexibility (e.g. real options), risk management, resilience and crisis management, corporate restructuring, and alternative financing (private equity, venture capital). He has published widely in leading academic journals and other academic and practice-oriented media.

== Professional career ==
Hommel served as dean of the EBS from 2000 to 2002. In this role, he was the university's academic head and the faculty's head. He managed a major reform of the university's flagship program during his tenure. He implemented various initiatives advancing its internatilization including a significant expansion of international partners and adoption of dual degree offerings. Hommel became the rector of EBS in 2003 and stayed in this role until 2006. He oversaw a significant expansion of the university's faculty accompanied by further internationalization and establishing academic research as a core institutional value. During his tenure, EBS became the first university-level institution in Germany to implement the Bologna Accord which involved the switch-over from the German diploma to Bachelor & Master qualifications and the adoption of the ECTS system. While rector, he also served as Managing Director of the EBS gGmbH, the not-for-profit limited liability company owning EBS University.

Hommel joined EFMD Global Network (then called the European Foundation of Management Development) in 2007 as Associate Director of Quality Services. In this role, he was instrumental in establishing the EFMD Program Accreditation System (EPAS) which has since evolved into the EFMD Accredited system. During his tenure at EFMD until 2019, Hommel served as Director of Research & Surveys, Director of Business School Development and Director of Quality Services.

In 2020, Hommel co-founded XOLAS GmbH, a consultancy company focused on strategy and accreditation advisory for business schools and other higher education organizations.
