= Elisabeth Thand Ringqvist =

Swedish politician (born 1972)

- Thand Ringqvist in 2026

Leader of the Centre Party
- Incumbent
- Assumed office 13 November 2025
- Preceded by: Anna-Karin Hatt

Member of the Riksdag
- Incumbent
- Assumed office 27 September 2022
- Constituency: Stockholm Municipality

Personal details
- Born: Elisabeth Kristin Eriksson; 20 February 1972 (age 54) Östersund, Sweden
- Party: Centre
- Spouse: Erik Ringqvist
- Children: 2
- Education: Stockholm School of Economics

Elisabeth Kristin Thand Ringqvist (née Eriksson; born 20 February 1972) is a Swedish politician for the Centre Party. She is a member of the Riksdag since 2022, for Stockholm. On 7 November 2022, Thand Ringqvist was announced as one of the candidates for the leadership role of the Centre Party, which she did not win. On 4 November 2025, she was announced as the party's choice for new leader after the resignation of Anna-Karin Hatt. She was formally elected on 13 November.

Ahead of the 2026 Swedish general election, Thand Ringqvist emphasized the Centre Party's stance against cooperating with the far right Sweden Democrats, positioning the party toward a centre-right alternative.

== Career in business ==
Elisabeth Thand Ringqvist became chief executive officer of Företagarna in 2011. In December 2013, the magazine Resumé named her Lobbyist of the Year after an intensive lobbying campaign by Företagarna against a proposal that would have required companies to submit extensive monthly reports about their employees. The campaign led the government to withdraw the proposal.

The proposal later became law.
