= Centre Party (Sweden) =

Political party in Sweden

Centre Party Centerpartiet
- Abbreviation: C
- Party Chairman: Elisabeth Thand Ringqvist
- Leader in the Riksdag: Daniel Bäckström
- Party Secretary: Hannes Hervieu
- Founded: 2 March 1913; 113 years ago
- Headquarters: Stora Nygatan 4, Gamla stan, Stockholm
- Youth wing: Centre Party Youth
- Women's wing: Centerkvinnorna
- Membership (2024): ▼19,430
- Ideology: Liberalism (Swedish); Agrarianism (Nordic)
- Political position: Centre to centre-right
- European affiliation: ALDE Party
- European Parliament group: Renew Europe
- International affiliation: Liberal International
- Nordic affiliation: Centre Group
- Colours: Green
- Riksdag: 25 / 349
- European Parliament: 2 / 21
- County councils: 155 / 1,696
- Municipal councils: 1,603 / 12,700

Website
- centerpartiet.se

The Centre Party (Swedish: Centerpartiet [ˈsɛ̂nːtɛrpaˌʈiːɛt], C) is a liberal political party in Sweden, founded in 1913. The party focuses on the national economy, the environment, political decentralisation and social integration. It is represented in all of the Riksdag's parliamentary committees, currently holding 25 seats.

Traditionally part of the Nordic agrarian family of political parties, the Centre Party has increasingly switched focus towards economic liberalism, environmental protection, equality of the sexes and decentralisation of governmental authority. The party describes itself as liberal feminist, campaigning for policies which enhance gender equality on an individualist basis. Its environmental policies stress the importance of consent and voluntary action, including working with foresters and private landowners to promote biodiversity within a mutually agreeable framework.

The Centre Party has produced two prime ministers of Sweden: Axel Pehrsson who held the prime minister post for three months in 1936 and Thorbjörn Fälldin who held the post for a total of five years, from 1976 to 1978 and then again from 1979 to 1982. It is a member of the Alliance of Liberals and Democrats for Europe, the Liberal International and Renew Europe. It was originally named the Farmers' League (Swedish: Bondeförbundet [ˈbʊ̂nːdɛfœrˌbɵndɛt]; B).

== History ==
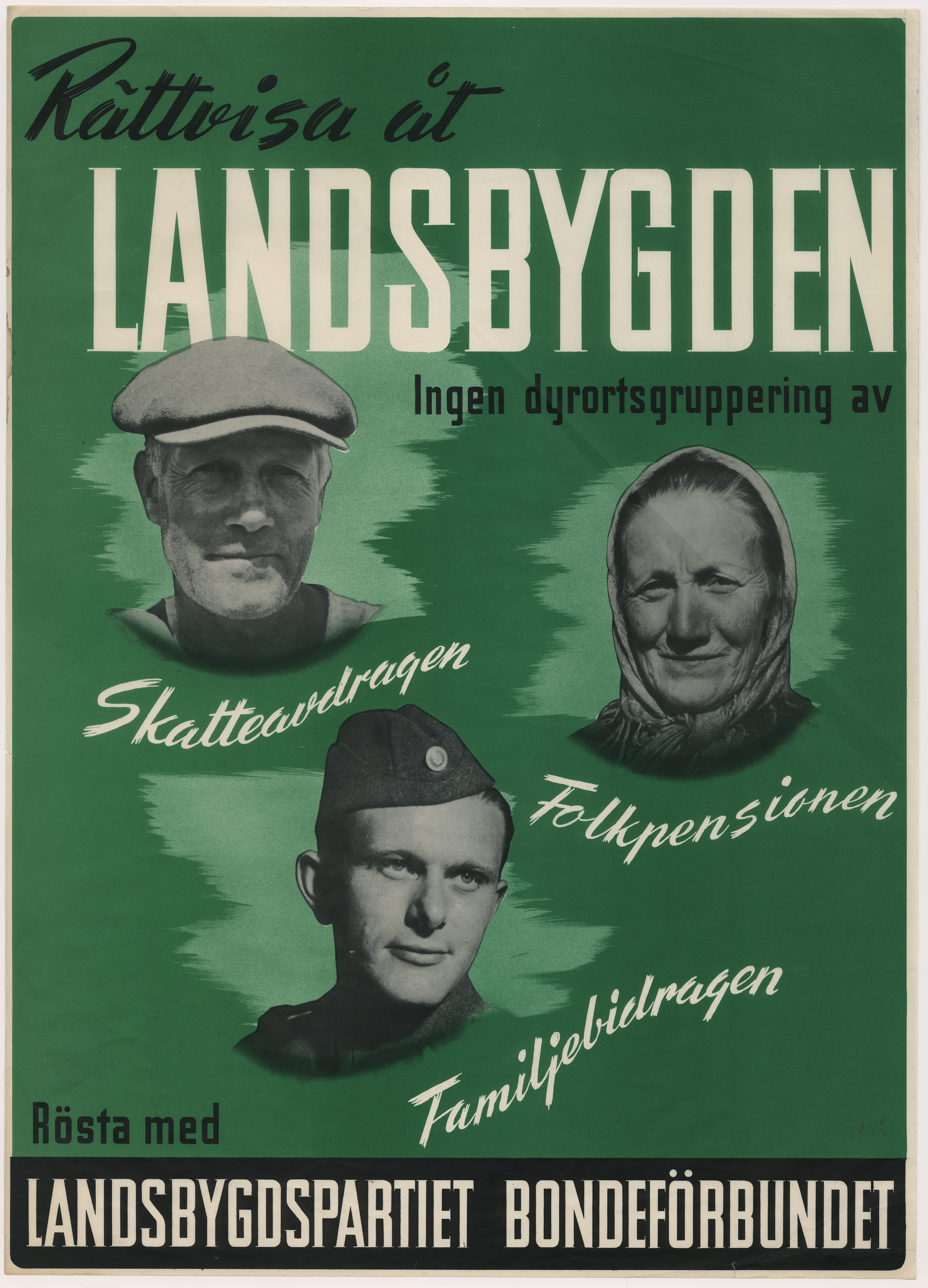
Farmers' League 1945 election poster

The party was founded in 1913 as the Farmers' League (Bondeförbundet, B). In 1921, it merged with the National Agrarian Union. It adopted the name Centre Party in 1958.

Centre Party leader Axel Pehrsson served as prime minister of Sweden for three months in 1936. After that, the party was a coalition partner of the centre-left Swedish Social Democratic Party between 1936 and 1945 as well as between 1951 and 1957. However, it later revised this strategy in order to establish a closer long-term alliance between the Swedish centre-right borgerlig ("bourgeois" or "non-socialist") parties. The party held the prime minister post a second time with Thorbjörn Fälldin who led centre-right coalition governments from 1976 until 1982, except for a short interregnum between 1978 and 1979 led by People's Party leader Ola Ullsten. Following the 1991 general election, the Centre Party joined the centre-right Carl Bildt cabinet, led by Moderate Party leader Carl Bildt.

During the leaderships of Maud Olofsson and Annie Lööf in the 2000s, the party positioned itself clearly on the political right as a small-business-friendly party, advocating market liberal policies and viewing the Social Democrats as its main opponent. Between 2006 and 2014, it was a member of the centre-right Reinfeldt cabinet. It provided confidence and supply for the Social Democratic led Löfven II cabinet between 2019 and 2021. Since 2022, it is in opposition against the right-wing Kristersson cabinet because of the cabinet's collaboration with the nationalist Sweden Democrats.

In 2005, the Centre Party sold the newspaper group it owned, Centertidningar AB, for 1.8 billion SEK, which made it the richest political party in the world at the time.

== Ideology and political position ==
The Centre Party sits on the centre to centre-right, even right-wing, of the political spectrum. The party has also described as economically and socially liberal, and "ecological-liberal". It describes itself as a green-liberal party, while it has been traditionally associated with agrarianism and the Nordic agrarian party family.

=== National economy ===
The party has been described as one of Sweden's most market liberal parties in liberal, socialist and conservative media. It describes itself as "a party with a green, social and decentralised liberalism". The party advocates lower taxes, greatly reduced employer contributions, a freer market and an increased RUT-deduction. The party is a major supporter of the interests of small businesses, farmers and entrepreneurs. It also favours investments in infrastructure and transportation, to allow employees to work in bigger cities but still live in the rural areas and vice versa. On economic policy, it views the Social Democrats and the Sweden Democrats as its opponents, though it supported a government led by the Social Democrats till 2022.

=== Immigration ===
The party is liberal on immigration, seeking to combine a generous immigration policy with an initially more restrictive contribution policy to the immigrants. After the European migrant crisis, the party proposed to replace the existing establishment grants with establishment loans, similar to the Swedish student loans.

The balance of the state responsibility of accepting refugees with their responsibility for integration into Swedish society is at the core of the party policy. In January 2016, the party for example proposed to give all immigrants compulsory civic education in both rights and expectations from the society.

=== European Union ===
The party is a decentralist pro-European party that considers the European Union important for the preservation of peace, freedom and trade in Europe. The party also advocates a smaller but sharper European Union focused on promoting democracy, peace, free movement, free trade, vigorous action against climate change and collaboration against organized crime, while also believing that Sweden should stay outside the Economic and Monetary Union of the European Union and keep the krona as its currency.

The party is a member of the ALDE Party and its affiliated European Parliament group Renew Europe. In the European Committee of the Regions, the Centre Party sits with the Renew Europe CoR group with one full and one alternate member for the 2025-2030 mandate.

== Publications ==
The Centre Party owned a media consortium called Centertidningar AB. It included newspapers that the party had either started on their own or brought from competitors. It included Hallands Nyheter, Södermanlands Nyheter, Länstidningen i Södertälje, Nynäshamns Posten, Norrtelje Tidning, Lidingö Tidning, Ljusdalsposten, Östersunds-Posten, Hälsingekuriren and Hudiksvalls Tidning. The consortium was split in 2005 and sold to Mittmedia, Stampen Group and VLT for a total of 1.815 billion Swedish kronor.

== Election results ==
=== Riksdag ===
| Election | Leader | Votes | % | Seats | +/– | Status |
|---|---|---|---|---|---|---|
| Sep 1914 | | 1,507 | 0.2 (#4) | 0 / 230 | | No seats |
| 1917 | | 39,262 | 5.3 (#5) | 9 / 230 | ▲9 | Opposition |
| 1920 | | 52,318 | 7.9 (#4) | 20 / 230 | ▲11 | Opposition |
| 1921 | Johan Andersson | 192,269 | 11.0 (#4) | 21 / 230 | ▼9 | Opposition |
| 1924 | Johan Andersson | 190,396 | 10.8 (#4) | 23 / 230 | ▲2 | Opposition |
| 1928 | Olof Olsson | 263,501 | 11.2 (#4) | 27 / 230 | ▲4 | Opposition |
| 1932 | Olof Olsson | 321,215 | 14.1 (#3) | 36 / 230 | ▲9 | Opposition (1932–1936) |
| 1932 | Olof Olsson | 321,215 | 14.1 (#3) | 36 / 230 | ▲9 | Minority (1936) |
| 1936 | Axel Pehrsson-Bramstorp | 418,840 | 14.4 (#3) | 36 / 230 | Steady | Coalition |
| 1940 | Axel Pehrsson-Bramstorp | 344,345 | 12.0 (#3) | 28 / 230 | ▼8 | Coalition |
| 1944 | Axel Pehrsson-Bramstorp | 421,094 | 13.6 (#3) | 35 / 230 | ▲7 | Coalition (1944–1945) |
| 1944 | Axel Pehrsson-Bramstorp | 421,094 | 13.6 (#3) | 35 / 230 | ▲7 | Opposition (1945–1948) |
| 1948 | Axel Pehrsson-Bramstorp | 480,421 | 12.4 (#3) | 30 / 230 | ▼5 | Opposition |
| 1952 | Gunnar Hedlund | 406,183 | 10.7 (#4) | 26 / 230 | ▼4 | Coalition |
| 1956 | Gunnar Hedlund | 366,612 | 9.5 (#4) | 19 / 231 | ▼7 | Coalition |
| 1958 | Gunnar Hedlund | 486,760 | 12.7 (#4) | 32 / 231 | ▲13 | Opposition |
| 1960 | Gunnar Hedlund | 579,007 | 13.6 (#4) | 34 / 232 | ▲2 | Opposition |
| 1964 | Gunnar Hedlund | 559,632 | 13.2 (#4) | 36 / 233 | ▲1 | Opposition |
| 1968 | Gunnar Hedlund | 757,215 | 15.7 (#2) | 39 / 233 | ▲3 | Opposition |
| 1970 | Gunnar Hedlund | 991,208 | 19.9 (#2) | 71 / 350 | ▲32 | Opposition |
| 1973 | Thorbjörn Fälldin | 1,295,246 | 25.1 (#2) | 90 / 350 | ▲19 | Opposition |
| 1976 | Thorbjörn Fälldin | 1,309,669 | 24.1 (#2) | 86 / 349 | ▼4 | Coalition (1976–1978) |
| 1976 | Thorbjörn Fälldin | 1,309,669 | 24.1 (#2) | 86 / 349 | ▼4 | Opposition (1978–1979) |
| 1979 | Thorbjörn Fälldin | 984,589 | 18.1 (#3) | 64 / 349 | ▼22 | Coalition |
| 1982 | Thorbjörn Fälldin | 859,618 | 15.5 (#3) | 56 / 349 | ▼8 | Opposition |
| 1985 | Thorbjörn Fälldin | 490,999 | 8.8 (#4) | 43 / 349 | ▼13 | Opposition |
| 1988 | Olof Johansson | 607,240 | 11.3 (#4) | 42 / 349 | ▼1 | Opposition |
| 1991 | Olof Johansson | 465,356 | 8.5 (#4) | 31 / 349 | ▼11 | Coalition |
| 1994 | Olof Johansson | 425,153 | 7.7 (#3) | 27 / 349 | ▼4 | Opposition (1994–1995) |
| 1994 | Olof Johansson | 425,153 | 7.7 (#3) | 27 / 349 | ▼4 | External support (1995–1998) |
| 1998 | Lennart Daléus | 269,762 | 5.1 (#5) | 18 / 349 | ▼9 | Opposition |
| 2002 | Maud Olofsson | 328,428 | 6.2 (#6) | 22 / 349 | ▲4 | Opposition |
| 2006 | Maud Olofsson | 437,389 | 7.9 (#3) | 29 / 349 | ▲7 | Coalition |
| 2010 | Maud Olofsson | 390,804 | 6.6 (#5) | 23 / 349 | ▼6 | Coalition |
| 2014 | Annie Lööf | 370,834 | 6.1 (#5) | 22 / 349 | ▼1 | Opposition |
| 2018 | Annie Lööf | 557,500 | 8.6 (#4) | 31 / 349 | ▲9 | External support |
| 2022 | Annie Lööf | 434,945 | 6.7 (#5) | 24 / 349 | ▼7 | Opposition |
| 2026 | Elisabeth Thand Ringqvist | 475,780 | 7.03 (#5) | 25 / 349 | ▲1 | TBA |

=== European Parliament ===
| Election | List leader | Votes | % | Seats | +/– | EP Group |
|---|---|---|---|---|---|---|
| 1995 | Karl Erik Olsson | 192,077 | 7.16 (#5) | 2 / 22 | New | ELDR |
| 1999 | Karl Erik Olsson | 151,442 | 5.99 (#7) | 1 / 22 | ▼1 | ELDR |
| 2004 | Lena Ek | 157,258 | 6.26 (#6) | 1 / 19 | Steady | ALDE |
| 2009 | Lena Ek | 173,414 | 5.47 (#7) | 1 / 18 1 / 20 | Steady | ALDE |
| 2014 | Kent Johansson | 241,101 | 6.49 (#6) | 1 / 20 | Steady | ALDE |
| 2019 | Fredrick Federley | 447,641 | 10.78 (#5) | 2 / 20 | ▲1 | RE |
| 2024 | Emma Wiesner | 306,227 | 7.29 (#6) | 2 / 21 | Steady | RE |

== Voter base ==
Centre Party election results for 2006, showing the significant focus of Centre Party support in rural areas 0-4.9% 5-7.8% 8-11.9% 12-15.9% 16%+

Traditionally, most of the party's voters come from rural areas and include farmers and agricultural producers. Since the takeover of Maud Olofsson in recent years, the party has been attracting liberal voters from urban areas in central Sweden. It is believed that voters from the Liberals have been moving to the Centre Party due to changes in both parties.

== Leaders of the Centre Party ==
The Leader of the Centre Party is its highest political and organisational officer, its president in the National Executive Board and representative of the party in the media, in public and with other parties. The party leader has often held an important cabinet portfolio when the party has been part of a coalition.

| Name | Portrait | Period | Notes |
|---|---|---|---|
| Erik Eriksson | | 1916–1920 | |
| Johan Andersson | | 1920–1924 | |
| Johan Johansson | | 1924–1928 | |
| Olof Olsson | | 1928–1934 | |
| Axel Pehrsson-Bramstorp | | 1934–1949 | Prime Minister of Sweden from 19 June 1936 to 28 September 1936. Minister of Agriculture from 1936 to 1945. |
| Gunnar Hedlund | | 1949–1971 | Minister of the Interior from 1951 to 1957. |
| Thorbjörn Fälldin | | 1971–1985 | Two-time Prime Minister of Sweden from 1976 to 1978, and 1979 to 1982. |
| Karin Söder | | 1985–1987 | First woman in Sweden to be elected the leader of a major political party. One of the first female foreign ministers in the world. Minister for Foreign Affairs from 1976 to 1978. Minister for Health and Social Affairs from 1979 to 1982. |
| Olof Johansson | | 1987–1998 | Minister for Energy from 1976 to 1978. Minister for the Environment from 1991 to 1994. |
| Lennart Daléus | | 1998–2001 | |
| Maud Olofsson | | 2001–2011 | Deputy Prime Minister of Sweden from 2006 to 2010. Minister for Business and Industry from 2006 to 2011. |
| Annie Lööf | | 2011–2023 | Minister for Business and Industry from 2011 to 2014. |
| Muharrem Demirok | | 2023–2025 | |
| Anna-Karin Hatt | | 2025 | Minister for Energy from 2011 to 2014. Minister for Digital Development from 2011 to 2014. Minister for Regions from 2010 to 2011. |
| Elisabeth Thand Ringqvist | | 2025– | |

== Current Members of the Swedish Parliament ==
Current Members of the Swedish Parliament:

- Daniel Bäckström, parliamentary leader, spokesperson for rural affairs, member for Värmland
- Ulrika Heie, first deputy parliamentary leader and spokesperson for infrastructure policy, member for Västra Götalands läns östra
- Elisabeth Thand Ringqvist, second deputy parliamentary leader, spokesperson for enterprise, member for Stockholms stad
- Anders W. Jonsson, spokesperson för healthcare policy, member for Gävleborg
- Alireza Akhondi, spokesperson for housing, member for Stockholms län
- Anders Karlsson, member for Jönköpings län
- Anders Ådahl, spokesperson for science and higher education, member for Västra götalands läns västra
- Anna Lasses, spokesperson for international aid, member for Stockholms län
- Anne-Li Sjölund, spokesperson for sports, member for Västernorrland
- Catarina Deremar, spokesperson for culture, member for Uppsala län
- Christofer Bergenblock, spokesperson for elderly care and disability rights, member for Halland
- Helena Lindahl, spokesperson for taxation, member for Västerbotten
- Helena Vilhelmsson, spokesperson for gender equality, member for Örebro län
- Jonny Cato, spokesperson for employment, member for Skåne läns västra
- Kerstin Lundgren, third deputy speaker of the Riksdag, spokesperson for foreign policy, member for Stockholms län
- Malin Björk, spokesperson for constitutional affairs, member for Stockholms stad
- Martin Ådahl, spokesperson for economic policy, member for Stockholms stad
- Martina Johansson, spokesperson for social security, member for Södermanland
- Mikael Larsson, spokesperson for defence, member for Västra Götalands läns södra
- Muharrem Demirok, member for Östergötland
- Niels Paarup-Petersen, spokesperson for education policy, member for Malmö
- Rickard Nordin, spokesperson for energy and climate policy, member for Gothenburg
- Stina Larsson, spokesperson for environmental policy, member for Skåne läns södra
- Ulrika Liljeberg, spokesperson for legal policy, member for Dalarna

Substitutes:

- Mona Smedman (January - May 2024), for Daniel Bäckström
- Emelie Nyman (January - June 2024), for Niels Paarup-Petersen

== Party leadership ==
The current party leadership includes:

- Elisabeth Thand Ringqvist, chairperson of the Centre Party
- Rickard Nordin, deputy chairperson of the Centre Party
- Daniel Bäckström, parliamentary leader and spokesperson for rural policy
- Ulrika Liljeberg, member of parliament and spokesperson for legal policy
- Martin Ådahl, member of parliament and spokesperson for economic policy
- Madelaine Jacobsson, mayor of the Nordmaling Municipality
- Karin Ernlund, Secretary-General of the Centre Party

== See also ==
- Liberals (Sweden)
- Centerkvinnorna
- Centre Party (Sweden, 1924)
- Per Jonas Edberg
- David Gomér
- Erik Grebäck
- Carl Grewesmühl
- Emil Gustafson i Vimmerby
- Aron Gustafsson
- Per Gustafsson i Benestad
- Gustav Hallagård
- Ulrich Hommel
- Emil Hultman
- Helmer Johansson
- Gustaf Jonnergård
- Arvid Jonsson
- Hugo Karlström
