= Johan Andersson i Raklösen =

Swedish politician

Johan Andersson i Raklösen (June 29, 1866 – January 19, 1924) was a Swedish politician. He was first a member of the Liberal Coalition Party, later of the Centre Party.
