= Results of the 1958 Swedish general election =

Sweden held an early general election to fulfil the four-year term between the regular 1956 and 1960 elections. Although the centre-right received more votes, the leftist parties won one more seat. The election was held on 1 June.

== Results ==
Party	Votes	%	Seats	+/–
Swedish Social Democratic Party	1,776,667	46.22	111	+5
Rightist Party	750,332	19.52	45	+3
People's Party	700,019	18.21	38	–20
Centre Party	486,760	12.66	32	+13
Communist Party	129,319	3.36	5	–1
Left Socialist Party	1,008	0.03	0	0
Other parties	147	0.00	0	0
Total	3,844,252	100.00	231	0
Valid votes	3,844,252	99.46		
Invalid/blank votes	20,711	0.54		
Total votes	3,864,963	100.00		
Registered voters/turnout	4,992,421	77.42		
Source: Nohlen & Stöver

== Regional results ==
=== Percentage share ===
Location	Share	Votes	S	H	FP	C	K	Other	Left	Right
Götaland	48.3	1,855,881	42.6	21.6	18.6	15.2	1.9	0.1	44.5	55.4
Svealand	35.7	1,370,962	48.6	19.8	19.3	8.6	3.8	0.0	52.3	47.7
Norrland	16.1	617,409	52.0	12.6	14.8	13.9	6.7	0.0	58.7	41.3
Total	100.0	3,844,252	46.2	19.5	18.2	12.7	3.4	0.0	49.6	50.4
Source: SCB

=== By votes ===
Location	Share	Votes	S	H	FP	C	K	Other	Left	Right
Götaland	48.3	1,855,881	789,771	401,608	344,654	282,674	36,104	1,070	825,875	1,028,936
Svealand	35.7	1,370,962	665,984	271,128	264,039	118,136	51,620	55	717,604	653,303
Norrland	16.1	617,409	320,912	77,596	91,326	85,950	41,595	30	362,507	254,872
Total	100.0	3,844,252	1,776,667	750,332	700,019	486,760	129,319	1,155	1,905,986	1,937,111
Source: SCB

== Constituency results ==
=== Percentage share ===
Location	Land	Turnout	Share	Votes	S	H	FP	C	K	Other	Left	Right	Margin
Location		%	%		%	%	%	%	%	%	%	%	
Blekinge	G	72.2	1.9	72,256	50.2	18.0	22.0	9.8	0.0	0.0	50.2	49.8	346
Bohuslän	G	71.9	2.8	105,892	41.0	17.4	26.2	12.4	2.6	0.0	43.7	56.3	13,442
Gothenburg	G	73.1	5.3	204,381	39.9	17.3	33.5	0.0	8.8	0.5	48.7	50.8	4,275
Gotland	G	77.2	0.7	28,810	34.1	17.3	14.5	34.1	0.0	0.0	34.1	65.9	9,140
Gävleborg	N	72.8	3.8	147,994	53.5	10.6	15.2	13.1	7.6	0.0	61.1	38.9	32,968
Halland	G	75.5	2.3	87,913	34.9	19.1	13.1	31.4	1.5	0.0	36.4	63.6	23,853
Jämtland	N	72.7	1.9	73,468	52.9	16.0	13.9	17.2	0.0	0.0	52.9	47.1	4,325
Jönköping	G	78.1	3.9	151,000	40.0	20.3	21.1	18.6	0.0	0.0	40.0	60.0	30,100
Kalmar	G	74.4	3.2	122,158	43.4	23.7	9.8	21.3	1.8	0.0	45.2	54.8	11,739
Kopparberg	S	68.9	3.5	134,652	52.3	13.2	16.5	14.3	3.7	0.0	56.0	44.0	16,164
Kristianstad	G	75.1	3.5	134,071	38.6	24.4	17.8	19.2	0.0	0.0	38.6	61.4	30,630
Kronoberg	G	75.0	2.2	83,603	39.9	22.8	11.7	25.6	0.0	0.0	39.9	60.1	16,942
Malmö area	G	80.9	5.3	202,862	50.7	31.5	14.8	1.5	1.5	0.0	52.2	47.8	8,856
Malmöhus	G	79.8	3.7	141,521	44.3	18.5	13.6	23.6	0.0	0.0	44.3	55.7	16,074
Norrbotten	N	75.5	3.1	118,728	53.1	13.0	8.1	9.7	16.1	0.0	69.2	30.8	45,561
Skaraborg	G	76.5	3.4	130,843	33.4	21.8	19.8	23.5	1.5	0.0	34.9	65.1	39,491
Stockholm	S	73.6	11.2	429,753	42.1	26.5	23.6	1.8	6.0	0.0	48.1	51.9	16,013
Stockholm County	S	74.1	5.3	204,836	45.5	23.3	19.6	7.2	4.4	0.0	49.9	50.1	455
Södermanland	S	77.8	3.1	119,029	55.1	14.8	18.4	11.7	0.0	0.0	55.1	44.9	12,036
Uppsala	S	74.1	2.2	83,825	49.7	18.2	16.9	15.2	0.0	0.0	49.7	50.2	418
Värmland	S	74.9	4.0	154,076	50.9	17.6	14.4	11.7	5.4	0.0	56.3	43.7	19,516
Västerbotten	N	78.2	3.2	121,769	46.4	14.5	21.6	16.0	1.5	0.0	47.9	52.1	5,184
Västernorrland	N	78.7	4.0	155,450	53.6	10.9	14.6	14.8	6.1	0.0	59.6	40.4	29,965
Västmanland	S	72.9	2.9	110,385	56.0	12.3	16.0	12.5	3.2	0.0	59.2	40.8	20,289
Älvsborg N	G	75.0	2.7	104,248	43.7	15.6	23.5	17.2	0.0	0.0	43.7	56.3	13,202
Älvsborg S	G	78.3	2.5	94,493	39.2	29.5	14.1	15.2	2.0	0.0	41.2	58.8	16,558
Örebro	S	74.0	3.5	134,406	54.9	13.4	18.3	13.4	0.0	0.0	54.9	45.1	13,182
Östergötland	G	77.5	5.0	191,830	50.8	20.3	13.6	12.7	2.6	0.0	53.4	46.6	13,183
Total		77.4	100.0	3,844,252	46.2	19.5	18.2	12.7	3.4	0.0	49.6	50.4	31,125
Source: SCB

=== By votes ===
Location	Land	Turnout	Share	Votes	S	H	FP	C	K	Other	Left	Right	Margin
Location		%	%										
Blekinge	G	72.2	1.9	72,256	36,301	13,008	15,860	7,087			36,301	35,955	346
Bohuslän	G	71.9	2.8	105,892	43,450	18,444	28,097	13,126	2,775		46,225	59,667	13,442
Gothenburg	G	73.1	5.3	204,381	81,562	35,352	68,466	6	17,987	1,008	99,549	103,824	4,275
Gotland	G	77.2	0.7	28,810	9,835	4,987	4,168	9,820			9,835	18,975	9,140
Gävleborg	N	72.8	3.8	147,994	79,208	15,688	22,543	19,280	11,271	4	90,479	57,511	32,968
Halland	G	75.5	2.3	87,913	30,684	16,762	11,517	27,602	1,344	4	32,028	55,881	23,853
Jämtland	N	72.7	1.9	73,468	38,896	11,745	10,217	12,609		1	38,896	34,571	4,325
Jönköping	G	78.1	3.9	151,000	60,444	30,665	31,801	28,078		12	60,444	90,544	30,100
Kalmar	G	74.4	3.2	122,158	53,069	28,926	11,993	26,028	2,139	3	55,208	66,947	11,739
Kopparberg	S	68.9	3.5	134,652	70,385	17,779	22,214	19,248	5,020	6	75,405	59,241	16,164
Kristianstad	G	75.1	3.5	134,071	51,712	32,730	23,799	25,818	5	7	51,717	82,347	30,630
Kronoberg	G	75.0	2.2	83,603	33,328	19,050	9,840	21,380		5	33,328	50,270	16,942
Malmö area	G	80.9	5.3	202,862	102,857	63,984	29,998	3,019	3,000	4	105,857	97,001	8,856
Malmöhus	G	79.8	3.7	141,521	62,719	26,211	19,230	33,352		9	62,719	78,793	16,074
Norrbotten	N	75.5	3.1	118,728	63,079	15,484	9,602	11,497	19,065	1	82,144	36,583	45,561
Skaraborg	G	76.5	3.4	130,843	43,664	28,516	25,948	30,699	2,008	8	45,672	85,163	39,491
Stockholm	S	73.6	11.2	429,753	180,978	114,061	101,288	7,529	25,887	10	206,865	222,878	16,013
Stockholm County	S	74.1	5.3	204,836	93,235	47,759	40,046	14,835	8,950	11	102,185	102,640	455
Södermanland	S	77.8	3.1	119,029	65,530	17,590	21,921	13,983		5	65,530	53,494	12,036
Uppsala	S	74.1	2.2	83,825	41,700	15,211	14,190	12,717		7	41,700	42,118	418
Värmland	S	74.9	4.0	154,076	78,509	27,153	22,149	17,972	8,281	12	86,790	67,274	19,516
Västerbotten	N	78.2	3.2	121,769	56,452	17,667	26,266	19,535	1,832	17	58,284	63,468	5,184
Västernorrland	N	78.7	4.0	155,450	83,277	17,012	22,698	23,029	9,427	7	92,704	62,739	29,965
Västmanland	S	72.9	2.9	110,385	61,855	13,613	17,655	13,780	3,482		65,337	45,048	20,289
Älvsborg N	G	75.0	2.7	104,248	45,521	16,275	24,463	17,985		4	45,521	58,723	13,202
Älvsborg S	G	78.3	2.5	94,493	37,061	27,823	13,314	14,387	1,905	3	38,966	55,524	16,558
Örebro	S	74.0	3.5	134,406	73,792	17,962	24,576	18,072		4	73,792	60,610	13,182
Östergötland	G	77.5	5.0	191,830	97,564	38,875	26,160	24,287	4,941	3	102,505	89,322	13,183
Total		77.4	100.0	3,844,252	1,776,667	750,332	700,019	486,760	129,319	1,155	1,905,986	1,937,111	31,125
Source: SCB
