= 1960 Swedish general election =

← 1958	18 September 1960	1964 →

All 232 seats in the Andra kammaren of the Riksdag 117 seats needed for a majority
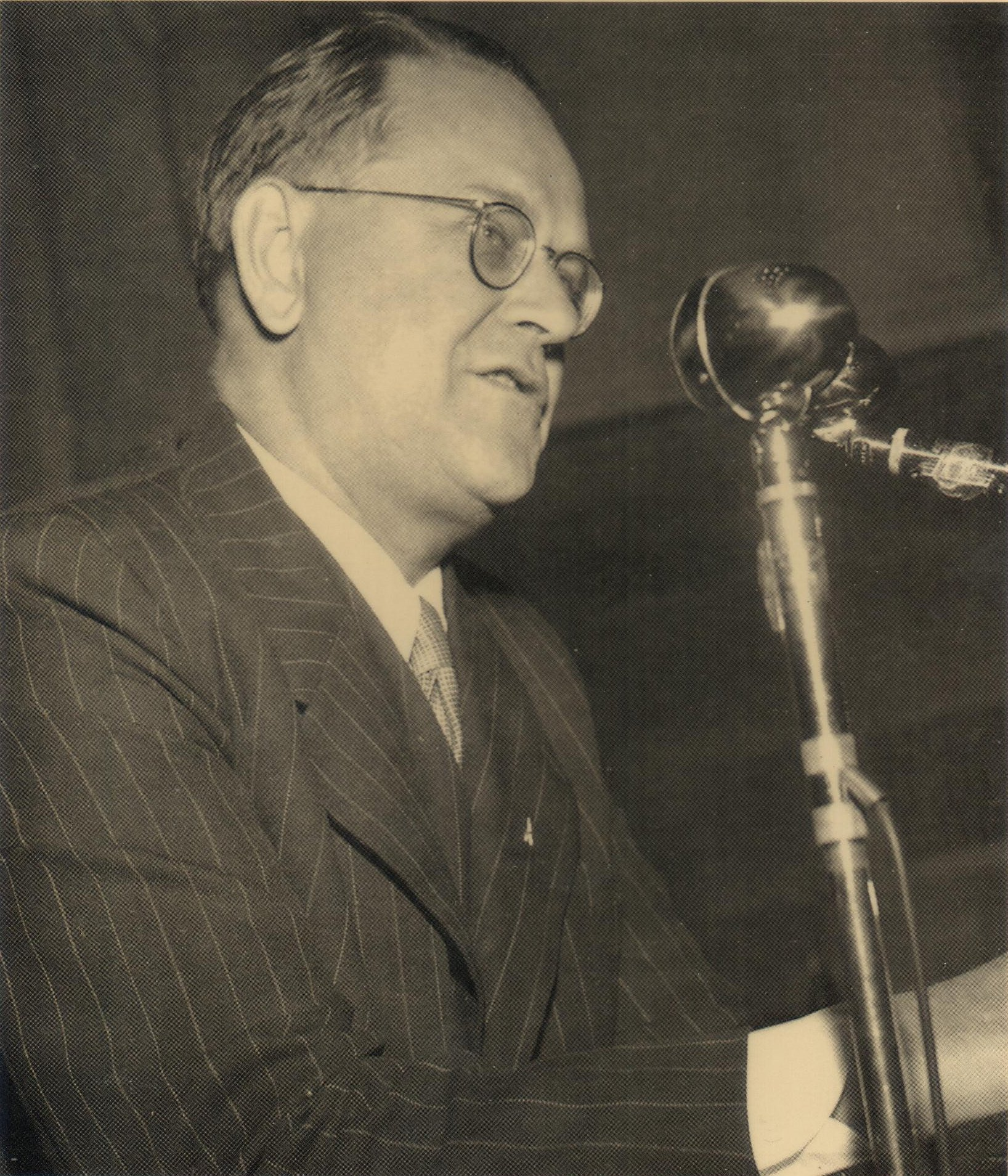

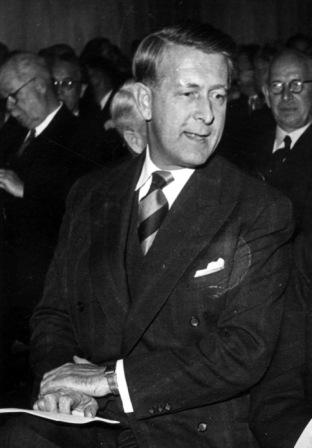

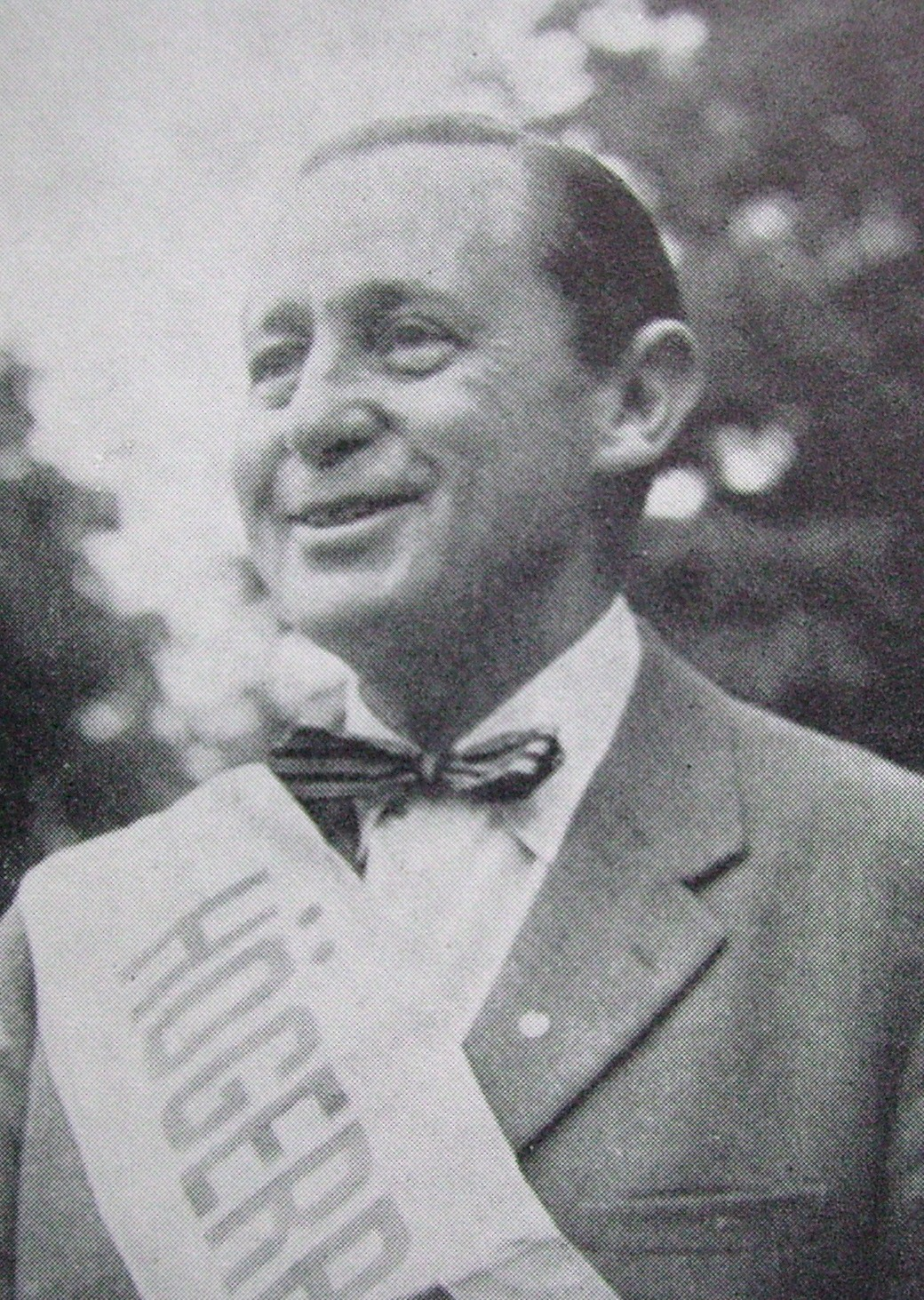

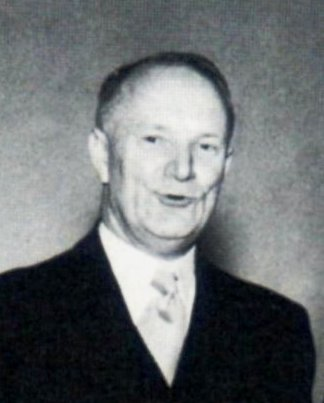

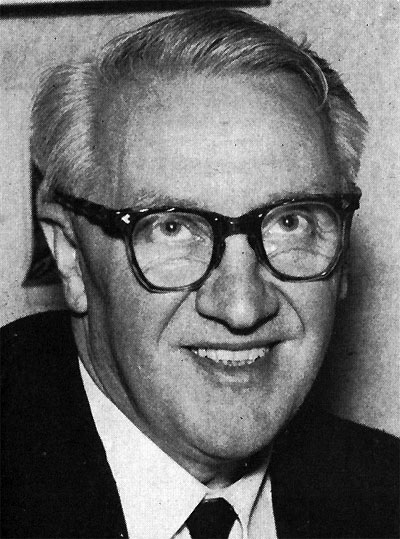
	First party	Second party	Third party
Leader	Tage Erlander	Bertil Ohlin	Jarl Hjalmarson
Party	Social Democrats	People's Party	Right
Last election	111	38	45
Seats won	114	40	39
Seat change	▲3	▲2	▼6
Popular vote	2,033,016	744,142	704,365
Percentage	47.79%	17.49%	16.56%
	Fourth party	Fifth party
Leader	Gunnar Hedlund	Hilding Hagberg
Party	Centre	Communist
Last election	32	5
Seats won	34	5
Seat change	▲1	Steady
Popular vote	579,007	190,560
Percentage	13.61%	4.48%
- Largest bloc and seats won by constituency
Prime Minister before election
Tage Erlander
Social Democrats
Elected Prime Minister
Tage Erlander
Social Democrats

General elections were held in Sweden on 18 September 1960. The Swedish Social Democratic Party remained the largest party, winning 114 of the 232 seats in the Andra kammaren of the Riksdag.

== Results ==
Party	Votes	%	Seats	+/–
Swedish Social Democratic Party	2,033,016	47.79	114	+3
People's Party	744,142	17.49	40	+2
Rightist Party	704,365	16.56	39	–6
Centre Party	579,007	13.61	34	+2
Communist Party	190,560	4.48	5	0
Progress Union	1,375	0.03	0	New
Corporate Party	614	0.01	0	New
Left Socialist Party	176	0.00	0	0
Other parties	859	0.02	0	0
Total	4,254,114	100.00	232	+1
Valid votes	4,254,114	99.59		
Invalid/blank votes	17,496	0.41		
Total votes	4,271,610	100.00		
Registered voters/turnout	4,972,177	85.91		
Source: Nohlen & Stöver
