= 1956 Swedish general election =

- 16 September 1956

All 231 seats in the Andra kammaren of the Riksdag 116 seats needed for a majority
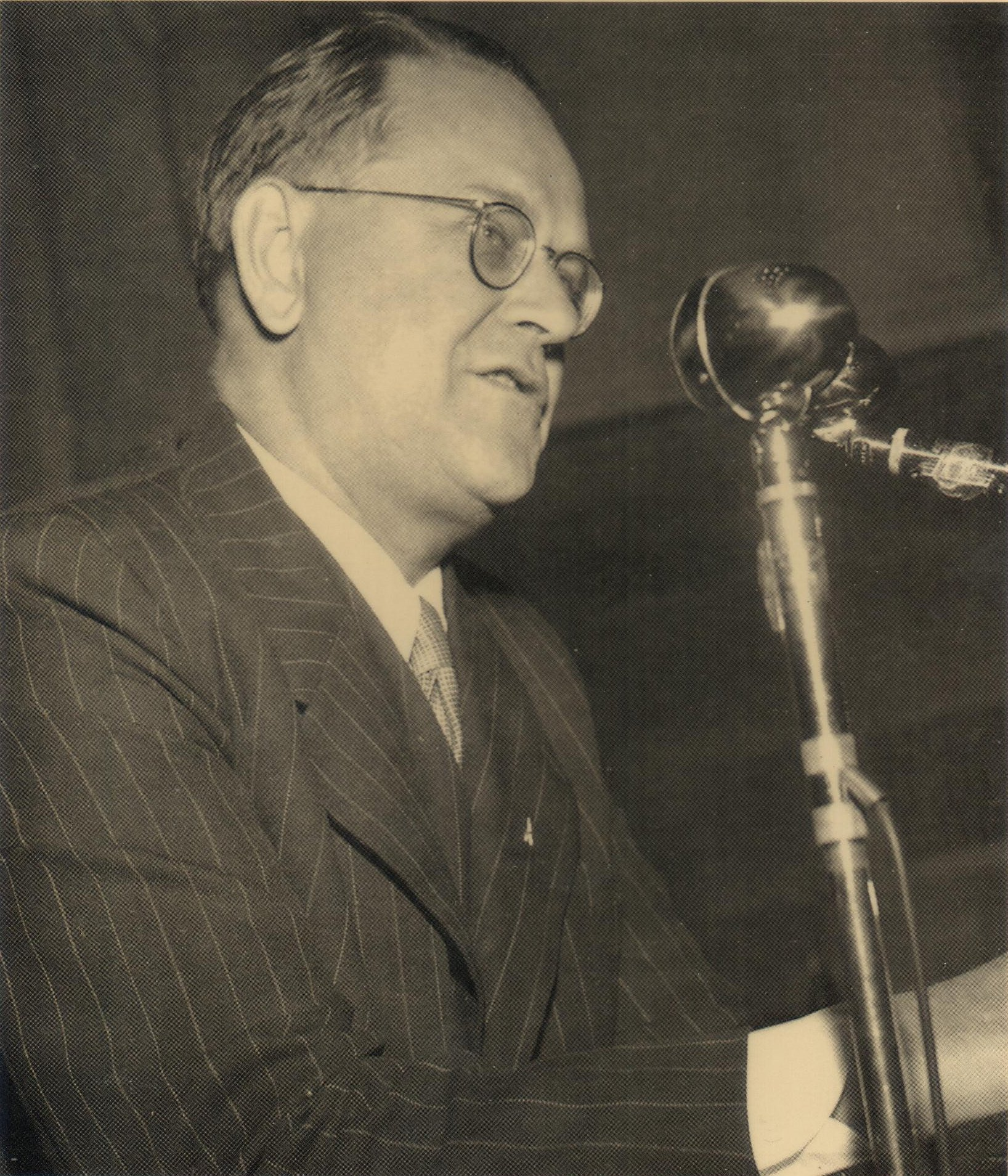

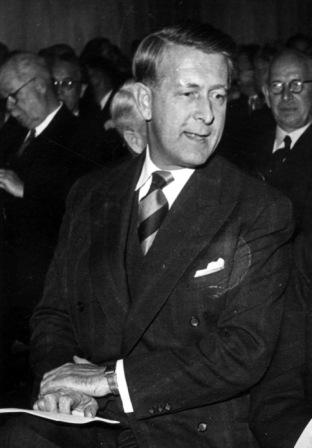

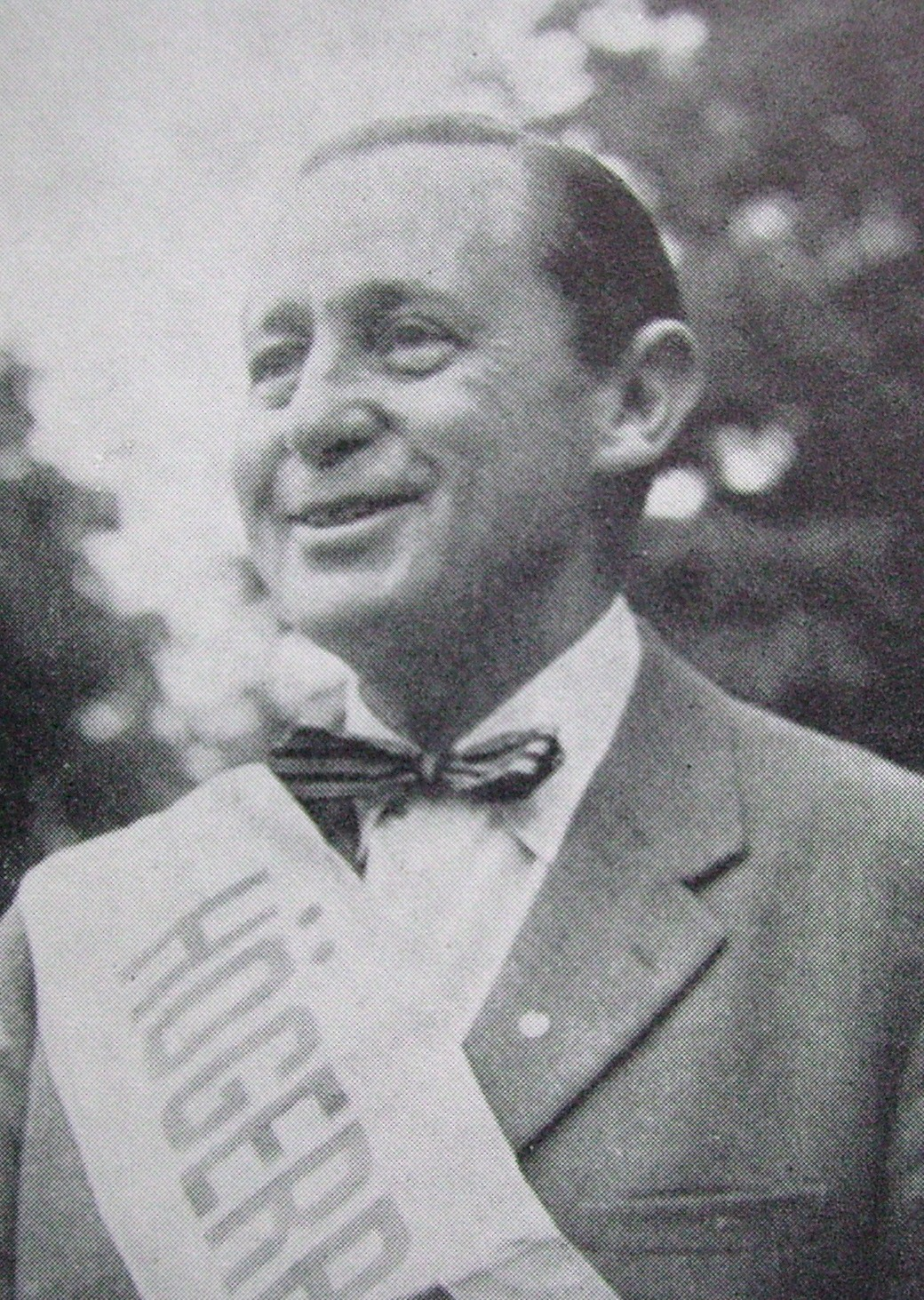

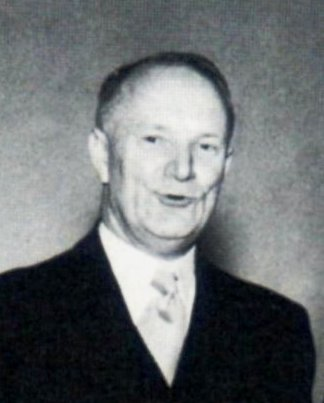

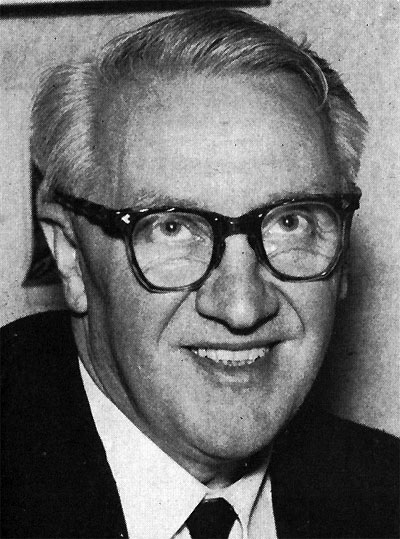
| | First party | Second party | Third party |
|---|---|---|---|
| Leader | Tage Erlander | Bertil Ohlin | Jarl Hjalmarson |
| Party | Social Democrats | People's Party | Right |
| Last election | 110 | 58 | 31 |
| Seats won | 106 | 58 | 42 |
| Seat change | ▼4 | Steady | ▲11 |
| Popular vote | 1,729,463 | 923,564 | 663 693 |
| Percentage | 44.58% | 23.81% | 17.11% |
| | Fourth party | Fifth party |
| Leader | Gunnar Hedlund | Hilding Hagberg |
| Party | Farmers' League | Communist |
| Last election | 26 | 5 |
| Seats won | 19 | 6 |
| Seat change | ▼7 | ▲1 |
| Popular vote | 366,612 | 194,016 |
| Percentage | 9.45% | 5.00% |
- Largest bloc and seats won by constituency
Prime Minister before election
Tage Erlander
Social Democrats
Elected Prime Minister
Tage Erlander
Social Democrats

General elections were held in Sweden on 16 September 1956. The Swedish Social Democratic Party remained the largest party, winning 106 of the 231 seats in the Andra kammaren of the Riksdag, losing a small number of seats for the third consecutive election. A Social Democratic-Farmers' League coalition government was formed by Prime Minister Tage Erlander after the election with 125 of the total of 231 seats. Although the non-socialist parties held a majority in the Second Chamber, the Social Democrats held a majority in the First Chamber, so a non-socialist government could not be formed.

The election was dominated by economic issues. The right-wing opposition focused issues such as taxes on income and companies, as well as regulation in the construction sector. The Erlander government mainly put front social policy and its policy of full employment. Through the use of radio and television the election was now more centralized than ever, with increased focus on the party leaders. A new generation of younger and more fiery party leaders had been elected between 1944 and 1950, which effected the climate of the debate. The tendencies of the previous election continued, with both governing parties losing seats, the Farmers league more so than the Social Democrats. The election triggered a discussion within the farmers league about parting from the governing coalition, as the governing parties had a difference of opinion on several issues since the past election. In the end however the farmers league decided to stay in government with the Social Democrats, with the coalition breaking up over the question of pension reform in 1957, leading to the formation of Tage Erlander's third government and a snap election in 1958.

== Results ==
| Party | Votes | % | Seats | +/– |
|---|---|---|---|---|
| Swedish Social Democratic Party | 1,729,463 | 44.58 | 106 | –4 |
| People's Party | 923,564 | 23.81 | 58 | 0 |
| Right Party | 663,693 | 17.11 | 42 | +11 |
| Farmers' League | 366,612 | 9.45 | 19 | –7 |
| Communist Party | 194,016 | 5.00 | 6 | +1 |
| Left Socialist Party | 1,252 | 0.03 | 0 | 0 |
| Samlingspartiet | 635 | 0.02 | 0 | New |
| Other parties | 95 | 0.00 | 0 | 0 |
| Total | 3,879,330 | 100.00 | 231 | +1 |
| Valid votes | 3,879,330 | 99.42 | | |
| Invalid/blank votes | 22,784 | 0.58 | | |
| Total votes | 3,902,114 | 100.00 | | |
| Registered voters/turnout | 4,887,325 | 79.84 | | |
Source: Nohlen & Stöver, SCB
