= Torsten Andersson (disambiguation) =

Torsten Andersson may refer to:

- Torsten Andersson (1926–2009), Swedish modernist painter
- Torsten Andersson (politician) (1909–1978), Swedish politician, Member of the Riksdag
- Thorsten Andersson (1923–2018), Swedish linguist
- Thorsten Andersson (1938—2011), Swedish director of the Lantbrukarnas Riksförbund, county governor
