= Albin Ström =

Swedish socialist politician

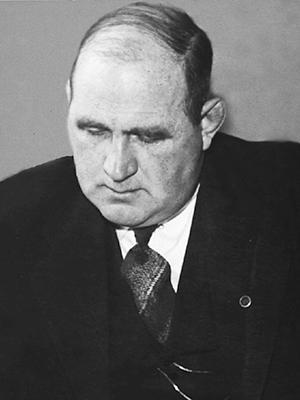

Johan Albin Ström (28 November 1892 in Ånimskog – 22 June 1962) was a Swedish socialist politician from Gothenburg. As a young Social Democrat, Ström joined Zeth Höglund in 1917 when the party was split in two, as Höglund's radical left-wing was expelled. The left-wing soon formed the Swedish Communist Party, but in 1923 Ström left the CP and rejoined the Social Democratic Party.

From 1928 Albin Ström was member of the Riksdag, first as a Social Democrat, then as a member of the Kilbom Communist Party, and from 1940 as party leader for the Left Socialist Party.
