= Revolutionary Socialist Party (Sweden) =

Revolutionary Socialist Party Revolutionära Socialistiska Partiet
- Abbreviation: RSP
- Leader: Evald Höglund; Gottfrid Nyberg
- Founded: 1945
- Dissolved: 1953
- Split from: VSP
- Ideology: Communism; Marxism; Trotskyism; Socialism
- International affiliation: Fourth International

Revolutionära Socialistiska Partiet (English: Revolutionary Socialist Party), a Swedish political party founded in 1945, as the Independent Labour Party (Swedish: Oberoende Arbetarpartiet). It was founded by a group that had split from the Left Socialist Party (VSP), when VSP had developed in a pro-Western direction. Leaders included Evald Höglund and Gottfrid Nyberg.

OAP published two issues of Vårt Ord.

In 1949, the group was reconstructed as Revolutionary Socialists (Revolutionära Socialister). RS became the first Swedish section of the Fourth International. The following year it changed name to RSP at a conference in Stockholm. The group gathered around a dozen persons.

RSP was active in the 1950 municipal elections in Stockholm (where they received 1,900 votes) and during the dockers' strike of 1951. RSP published two issues of Internationalen.

RSP was a short-lived party. Soon the leadership of FI ordered RSP to enter SAP and practice fraction politics, entryism, within this party. The members of RSP opposed this, and the organization was dissolved in 1953.

== See also ==
- Left Socialist Party (Sweden), Vänstersocialistiska partiet, 1940–1963)
- National Socialist People's Party of Sweden
- National Socialist Workers' Party (Sweden)
- Socialist Party (Sweden, 1929), Socialistiska partiet, 1929–1944
- Socialist Party (Sweden, 1971)
- Socialist Workers' Party of Sweden
