= Knut Olsson =

Swedish politician (1907–1986)

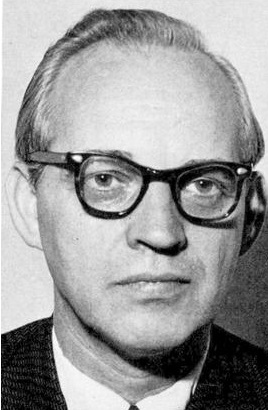
Knut Olsson

Knut Mauritz Gotthard Olsson (November 4, 1907 – November 13, 1986) was a Swedish communist politician. A talented speaker and prominent personality the local politics of the Swedish capital, he was commonly nicknamed stadens kommunist ('the communist of the city').

== Youth ==
Olsson grew up in Malmö, and was active in the temperance movement during his youth. Olsson graduated from a private secondary school in Lund in 1926. He studied sociology, political science and languages. He started working at the newspaper Folkets Dagblad Politiken, where he remained until 1929. He became the publisher of the newspaper Ny Dag in 1930, a position he held until 1945. Following the 1931 Ådalen shootings, Olsson was sentenced to eight months hard labour for the reporting of Ny Dag regarding the Ådalen events.

== War years ==
In 1936 he was included in the Central Committee and Political Bureau of the Communist Party of Sweden. During the Spanish Civil War he was an organizer of Swedish Relief Committee for Spain. The Communist Party put Olsson in charge of organizing the passages of Swedish volunteers travelling to Spain to fight in the International Brigades.

He was also the secretary of the Swedish branch of the International Red Aid. Between 1940 and 1946 he served as the chairman of the Young Communist League of Sweden and editor of Stormklockan. During the Second World War Olsson, along with many other communists, was detained at Sveg. In 1946 he became the secretary of the Communist Party, a position he held until 1977.

== Local politician ==
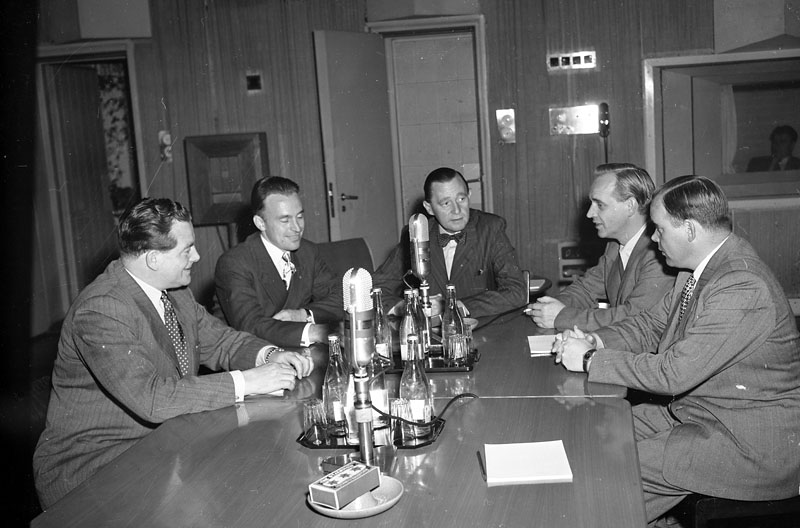
Radio interview, ahead of elections in 1950. From the left: Herbert Claesson (Social Democrat), Holger Wigerz (Liberal), Jarl Hjalmarson (Conservative), Knut Olsson (Communist) and Torsten Andersson (Farmers' League).

For many years Olsson was active in municipal politics in Stockholm. In 1942 he was elected to the Stockholm City Council. In 1946 he was elected as the chairman of the Stockholm Communist Labour Commune (i.e. the party organization in the capital). He was the second vice chairman of the City Council 1946–1950, and a member of the municipal board 1944–1950, 1954–1958 and 1966–1972. He was a member of the General Planning Commission of Stockholm 1959–1972 and a member of the Stockholm County Council 1971–1973. In 1963, Olsson was awarded the S:t Erik medal. In local politics Olsson was mainly dedicated to culture, education and urban planning issues.

Other institutions where Olsson was a board member was the 1946 National School Commission, National School Textbook Commission, the National Radio Commission and the Stockholm City Theatre. He edited the magazine 60-talet between 1959 and 1961. He was also active in the World Peace Council.

== Later years ==
When the Communist Party split in 1977, Olsson joined the Workers Party – Communists.
