= Jarl Hjalmarson Foundation =

Swedish foundation

The Jarl Hjalmarson Foundation is a Democracy Foundation closely linked to the Moderate Party. It focuses on training of politicians active in the Moderate Party’s sister parties, especially women and youth engaged in politics, in countries where the aid is believed to be of best use. Different important issues about how a democratic political party works are discussed during the educational programmes.

The foundation operates in Eastern Europe and in the countries on the Balkans. Previously, operations were also run among other places in Africa and in Latin America.

The foundation was founded in 1994. Initially the newly independent Baltic states were supported. The name of the foundation is chosen in homage to the late Moderate Party Chairman Jarl Hjalmarson.

Chairman of the board of the Jarl Hjalmarson Foundation is Mr Peter Egardt. Among previous chairmen of the Foundation you note Göran Lennmarker, former MP, Mr Gunnar Hökmark, former MEP and the former Swedish Minister for Foreign Affairs, Mrs Margaretha af Ugglas. Honorary chairman is Mr Carl Bildt, former Prime Minister and former Foreign Minister,

It is a member of the Wilfried Martens Centre for European Studies, the official foundation/think tank of the European People's Party.
