= 1964 Swedish general election =

← 1960	20 September 1964	1968 →

All 233 seats in the Andra kammaren of the Riksdag 117 seats needed for a majority
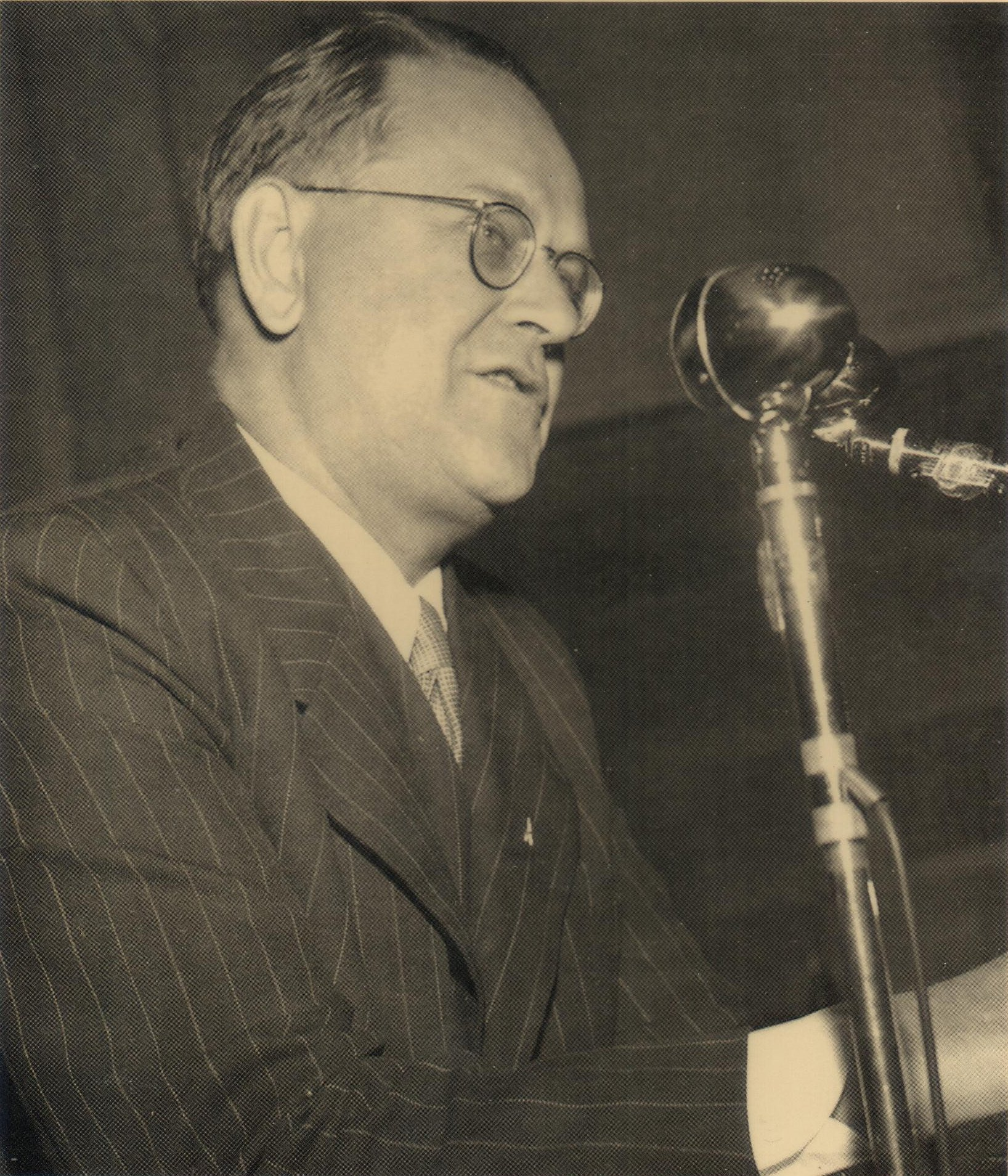

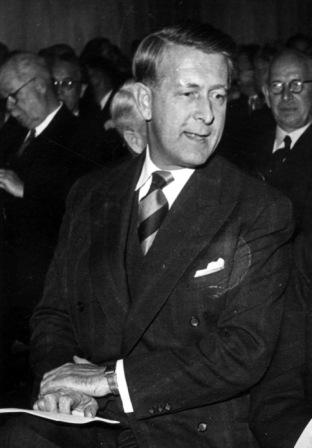

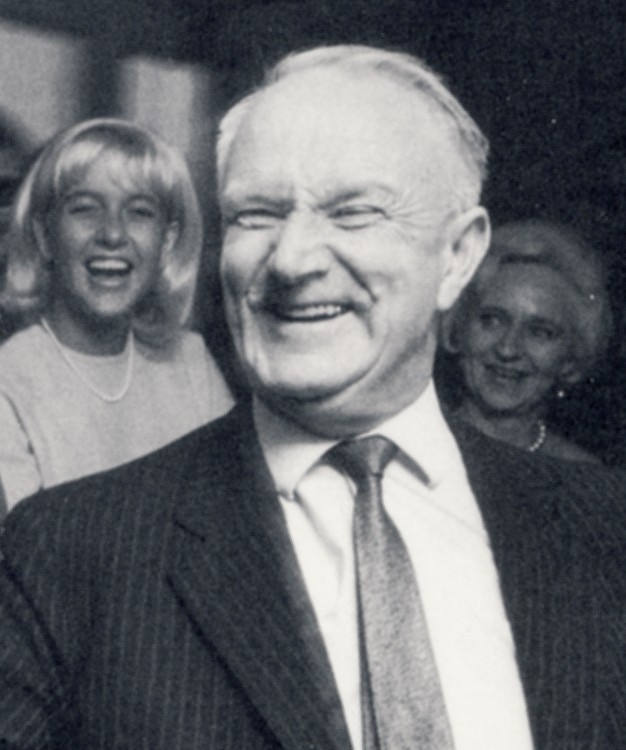

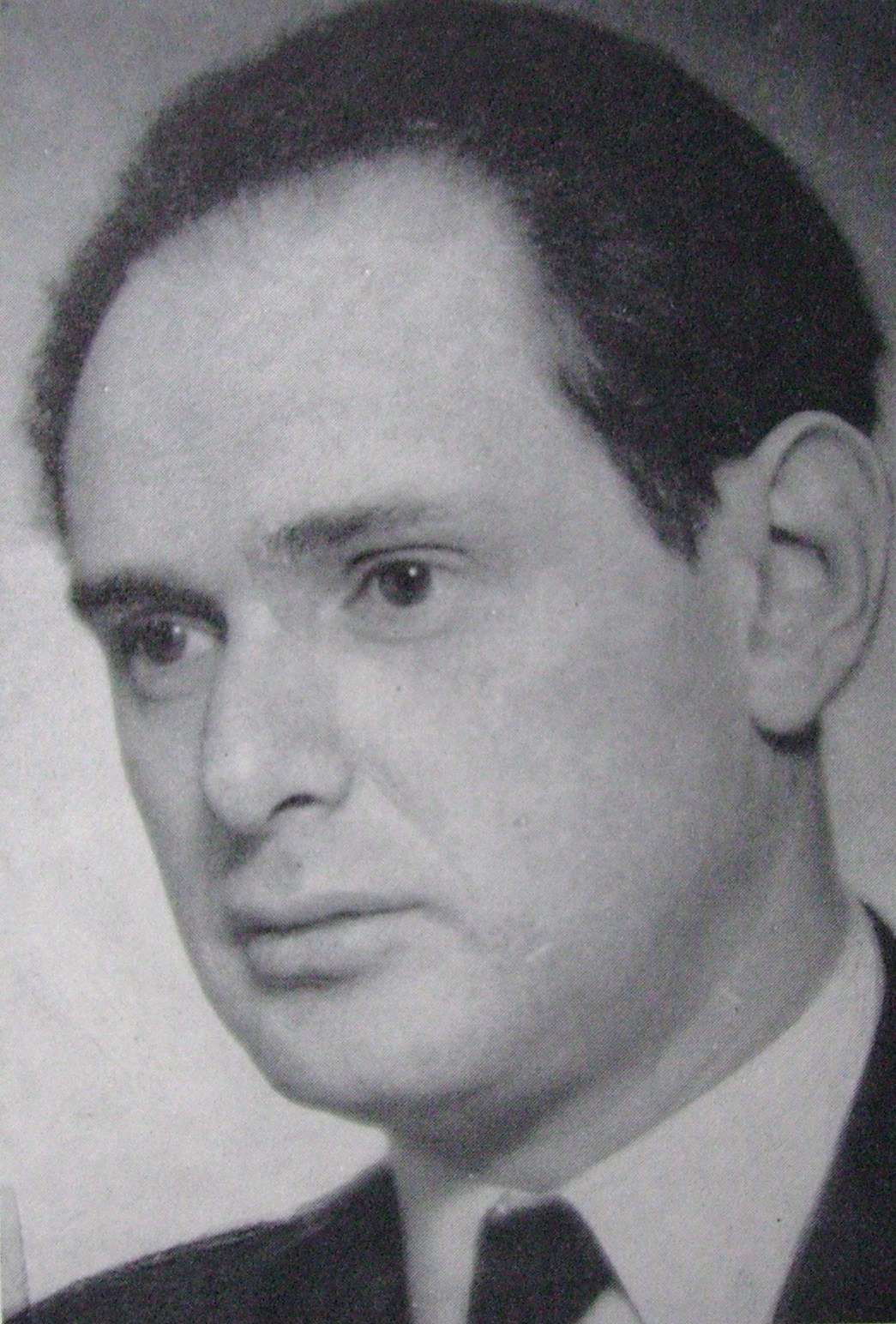

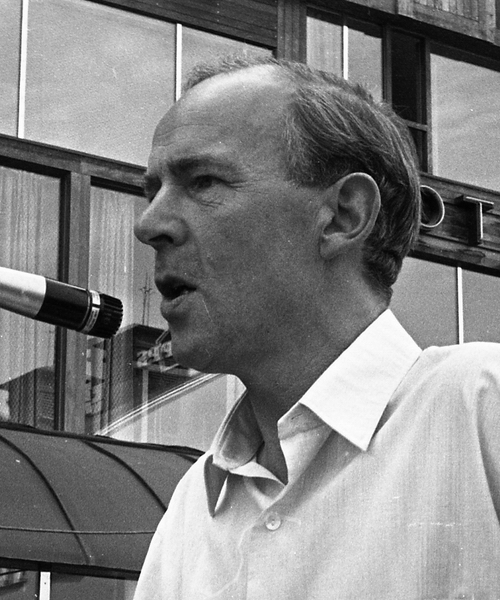
	First party	Second party	Third party
Leader	Tage Erlander	Bertil Ohlin	Gunnar Hedlund
Party	Social Democrats	People's Party	Centre
Last election	114	40	34
Seats won	113	43	35
Seat change	▼1	▲3	▲1
Popular vote	2,006,923	720,733	559,632
Percentage	47.27%	16.98%	13.18%
Swing	▼0.52 pp	▼0.51 pp	▼0.43 pp
	Fourth party	Fifth party
Leader	Gunnar Heckscher	C.-H. Hermansson
Party	Right	Communist
Last election	39	5
Seats won	33	8
Seat change	▼6	▲3
Popular vote	582,609	221,746
Percentage	13.72%	5.22%
Swing	▼3.38 pp	▲0.74 pp
- Largest bloc and seats won by constituency
Prime Minister before election
Tage Erlander
Social Democrats
Elected Prime Minister
Tage Erlander
Social Democrats

General elections were held in Sweden on 20 September 1964. The Swedish Social Democratic Party remained the largest party, winning 113 of the 233 seats in the Andra kammaren of the Riksdag. Tage Erlander's Social Democratic government was returned to power.

== Results ==
Party	Votes	%	Seats	+/–
Swedish Social Democratic Party	2,006,923	47.27	113	–1
People's Party	720,733	16.98	43	+3
Right Party	582,609	13.72	33	–6
Centre Party	559,632	13.18	35	+1
Communist Party	221,746	5.22	8	+3
Christian Democratic Unity	75,389	1.78	0	New
Civic Unity (Note: Joint list of the three right-wing parties in Malmö. One of its elected candidates was a member of the Centre Party, but sat as an independent.)	64,807	1.53	1	New
Middle Parties (Note: Joint list of the Centre Party and People's Party that contested some constituencies.)	13,557	0.32	0	New
Other parties	384	0.01	0	0
Total	4,245,780	100.00	233	+1
Valid votes	4,245,780	99.35		
Invalid/blank votes	27,815	0.65		
Total votes	4,273,595	100.00		
Registered voters/turnout	5,095,850	83.86		
Source: Nohlen & Stöver
