= Torsten Andersson (politician) =

Swedish politician (1909–1978)

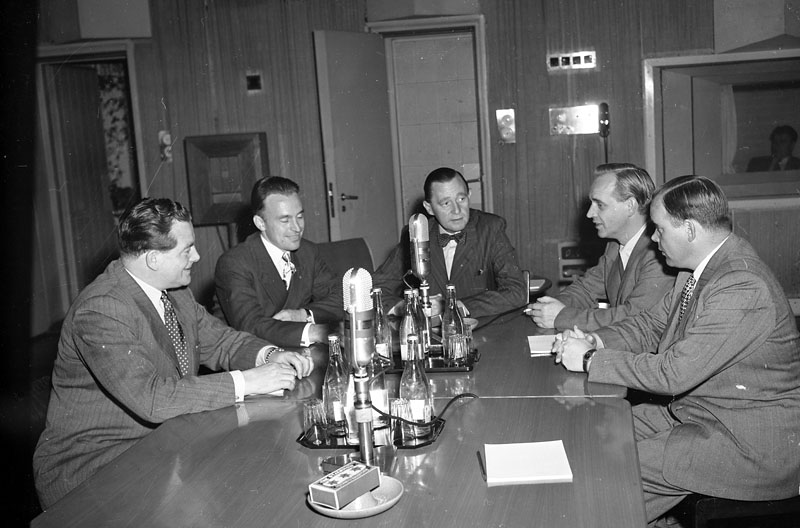
Radio interview, ahead of elections in 1950. From the left; Herbert Claesson (Social Democrat), Holger Wigerz (Liberal), Jarl Hjalmarson (Conservative), Knut Olsson (Communist) and Torsten Andersson (Farmers' League).

Torsten Andersson (December 9, 1909 – March 11, 1978) was a Swedish politician. He was a member of the Centre Party and a member of the Swedish parliament 1953-1956 (lower house) and 1957-1968 (upper house). He was county governor of Gotland County 1968–1974.
