= Jarl Hjalmarson =

Swedish politician and civil servant (1904–1993)

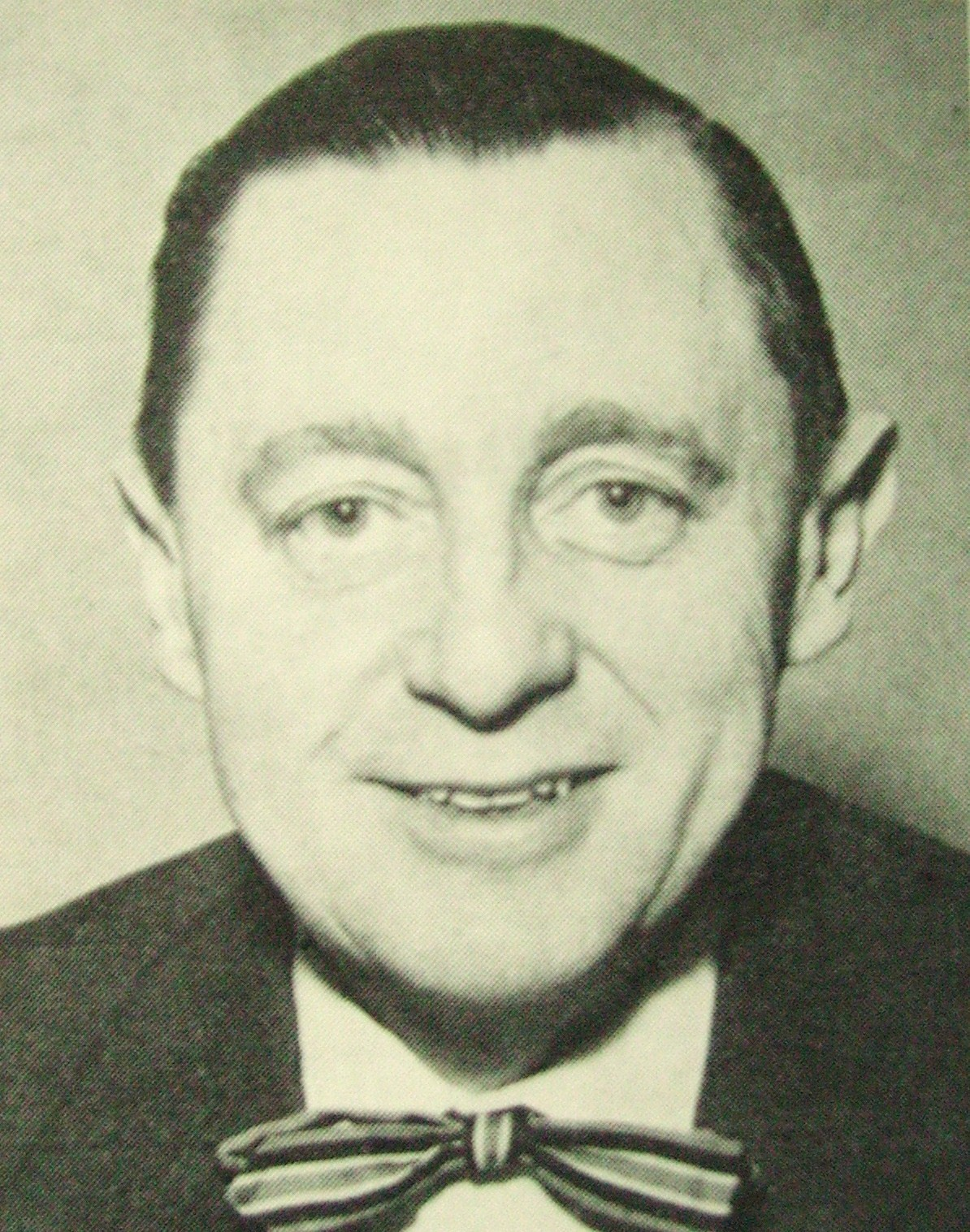

Leader of the Rightist Party
- In office 1950–1961

Personal details
- Born: 15 June 1904
- Died: 26 November 1993
- Parent: Harald Hjalmarson (father)

Jarl Harald Hjalmarson (15 June 1904 – 26 November 1993) was the leader of the conservative Swedish Rightist Party (Högerpartiet), today known as the Moderate Party, between 1950 and 1961.

Born in Helsingborg, he was considered as a moderate conservative, he led the Swedish conservatives to the position as the second-biggest party (after the predominant Social Democrats) in Sweden in the 1958 election. Under his leadership, the party undertook a wide agreement with the government to expand the Swedish armed forces in face of the ongoing Cold War and Swedish neutrality and vocally supported the development of Swedish nuclear weapons, which was ultimately abandoned.

== Family and education ==
Hjalmarson was the son of Major General Harald Hjalmarson, who helped to build up the Persian Government Gendarmerie and served in the Finnish Civil War. The elder Hjalmarson committed suicide after his return from Finland in 1918. Jarl Hjalmarson's mother was Blenda Hjalmarson, born Lindeborg. In 1929 Hjalmarson received a bachelor's degree in law. He married Eywor Dahlén in 1933 and had three sons, Torgils (born in 1936), Staffan (born in 1939) and Bo (born in 1943).

== Career ==
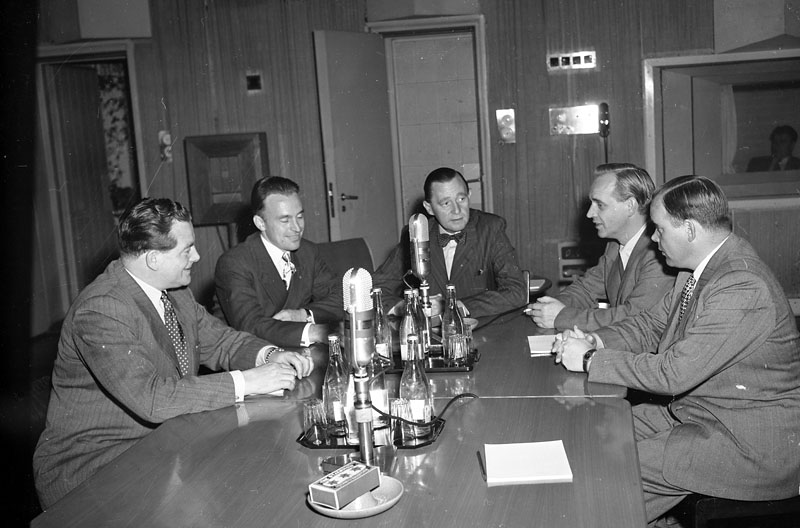
Radio interview, ahead of elections in 1950. From the left; Herbert Claesson (Social Democrat), Holger Wigerz (Liberal), Jarl Hjalmarson (Conservative), Knut Olsson (Communist) and Torsten Andersson (Farmers' League).

Hjalmarson became private secretary to prime minister Arvid Lindman from 1929 to 1930. From 1944, he was second deputy party leader in the Rightist Party. He became a member of the Parliament of Sweden's second chamber from 1947, after Professor Gösta Bagge. He became the leader of the Rightist Party, following the retirement of the farmer and estate-owner Fritiof Domö, in 1950.

During his time as party leader, he won improved election results for the Rightist Party in 1952, 1954, 1956 and the two elections in 1958. In 1960 the Rightist Party lost seats and votes in the general election because of the issue of the new pensions system, strongly criticised by the Rightist Party. After stern criticism inside the party, he made his intention public that he would stand down as party leader as soon as a successor had been chosen.

After his time as party leader, he served as governor of Gävleborg County from 1963 to 1971. He also served as a deeply respected mediator between Swedish labour and management to resolve labour conflicts. Later in his life, he became a vocal proponent for limiting the use of prisons, which he believed should only be used for the most dangerous criminals. He was also chairman of the Swedish Red Cross between 1970 and 1974.

When the Moderates started their party foundation for democratic aid and development, they named it the Jarl Hjalmarson Foundation after Hjalmarson.

Hjalmarson was awarded the Illis quorum in 1984.

Hjalmarson died in 1993 in Lidingö.
