= 1958 Swedish general election =

- 1 June 1958

All 231 seats in the Andra kammaren of the Riksdag 116 seats needed for a majority
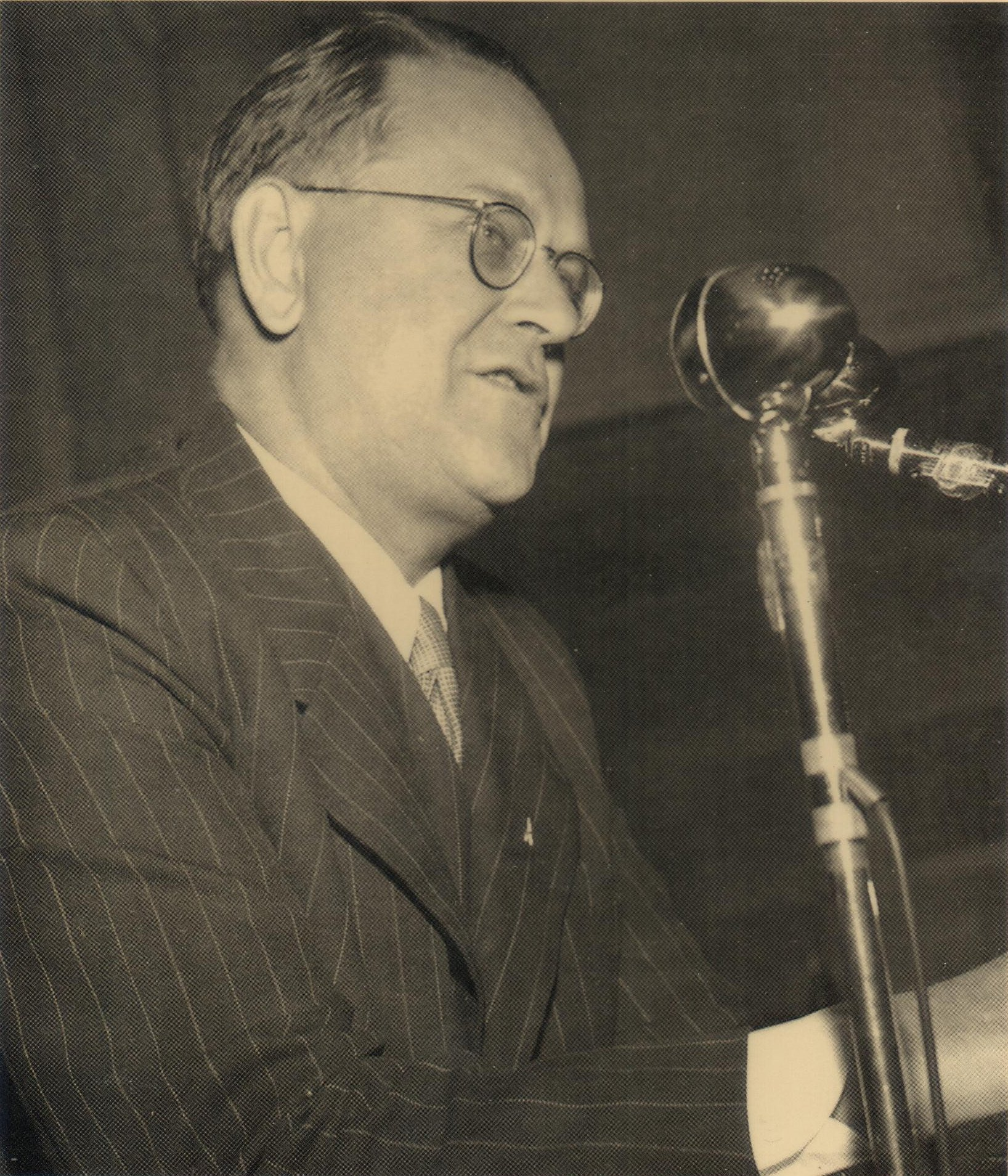

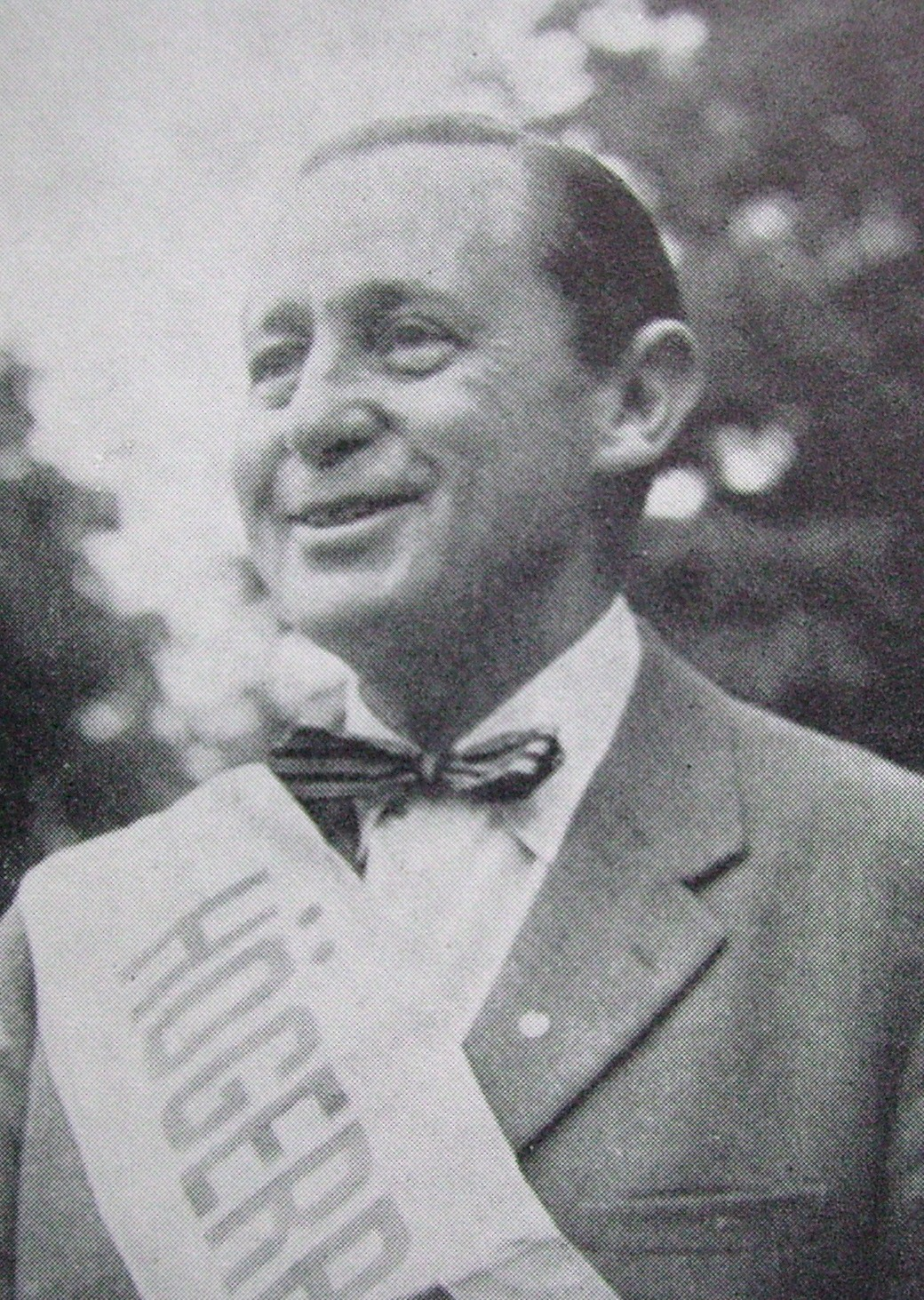

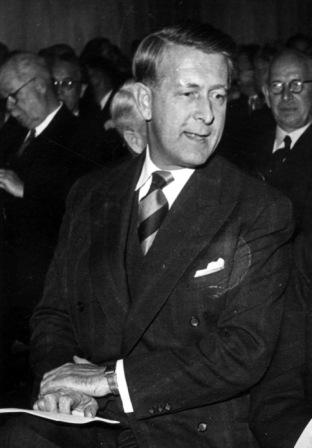

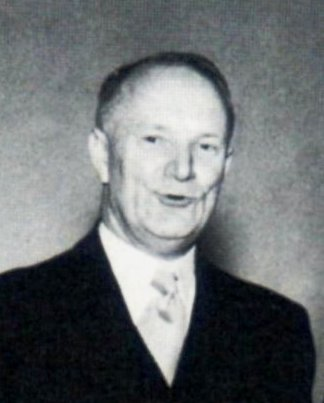

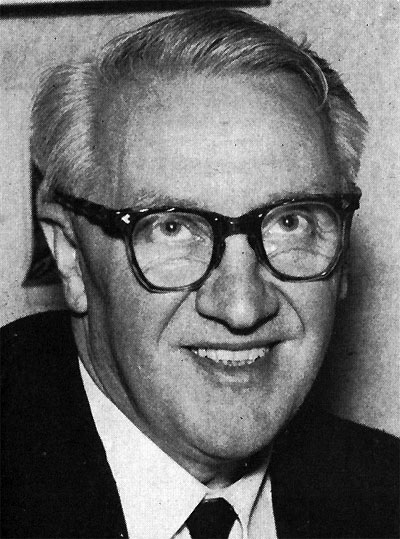
	First party	Second party	Third party
Leader	Tage Erlander	Jarl Hjalmarson	Bertil Ohlin
Party	Social Democrats	Right	People's Party
Last election	106	42	58
Seats won	111	45	38
Seat change	▲5	▲3	▼20
Popular vote	1,776,667	750,332	700,019
Percentage	46.22%	19.52%	18.21%
	Fourth party	Fifth party
Leader	Gunnar Hedlund	Hilding Hagberg
Party	Centre	Communist
Last election	19	6
Seats won	32	5
Seat change	▲13	▼1
Popular vote	486,760	129,319
Percentage	12.66%	3.36%
- Largest bloc and seats won by constituency
Prime Minister before election
Tage Erlander
Social Democrats
Elected Prime Minister
Tage Erlander
Social Democrats

Early general elections were held in Sweden on 1 June 1958, after the defeat of the Social Democratic government's proposals for a new pensions system in a parliamentary vote. The Social Democrats remained the largest party, winning 111 of the 231 seats in the Andra kammaren of the Riksdag, and Tage Erlander's third government was returned to power. In accordance with the then-Basic Law of 1809, a rule which persists, the new Chamber was elected only to complete the previous Chamber's term, which was due to end in 1960. It is the last snap election in Sweden and the last one to date (barring a series of referenda and local elections up to 1970) not held in September.

== Results ==
Party	Votes	%	Seats	+/–
Swedish Social Democratic Party	1,776,667	46.22	111	+5
Rightist Party	750,332	19.52	45	+3
People's Party	700,019	18.21	38	–20
Centre Party	486,760	12.66	32	+13
Communist Party	129,319	3.36	5	–1
Left Socialist Party	1,008	0.03	0	0
Other parties	147	0.00	0	0
Total	3,844,252	100.00	231	0
Valid votes	3,844,252	99.46		
Invalid/blank votes	20,711	0.54		
Total votes	3,864,963	100.00		
Registered voters/turnout	4,992,421	77.42		
Source: Nohlen & Stöver
