= Riksdag =

Supreme legislative body of Sweden

Coordinates: 59°19′39″N 18°04′03″E

Riksdag of Sweden Sveriges riksdag
- 2026–2030 term

Type
- Type: Unicameral Bicameral (1866–1970)

History
- Founded: 20 September 1970 (unicameral) 22 June 1866 (bicameral)

Leadership
- Speaker: Andreas Norlén, M since 24 September 2018
- First Deputy Speaker: Johanna Haraldsson, S since 28 September 2026
- Second Deputy Speaker: Julia Kronlid, SD since 26 September 2022
- Third Deputy Speaker: Kerstin Lundgren, C since 24 September 2018
- President by age: Anders Ygeman, S since 14 April 2025

Structure
- Seats: 349
- Political groups: Interim Government (Kristersson cabinet) (111) Moderates (70) Christian Democrats (22) Liberals (19) Supported by (62) Sweden Democrats (62) Opposition (176) Social Democrats (99) Left Party (30) Centre Party (25) Green Party (22)

Elections
- Voting system: Open list (Note: Candidates require 5% of their party's vote total in their constituency in order to override the default party-list order.) proportional representation (modified Sainte-Laguë method) with a 4% election threshold (Note: A party may earn seats even if they fail to reach 4% of the vote nationally, if they obtain 12% of the vote in a given constituency.) in constituencies based upon the counties of Sweden
- Last election: 13 September 2026
- Next election: 8 September 2030

Meeting place
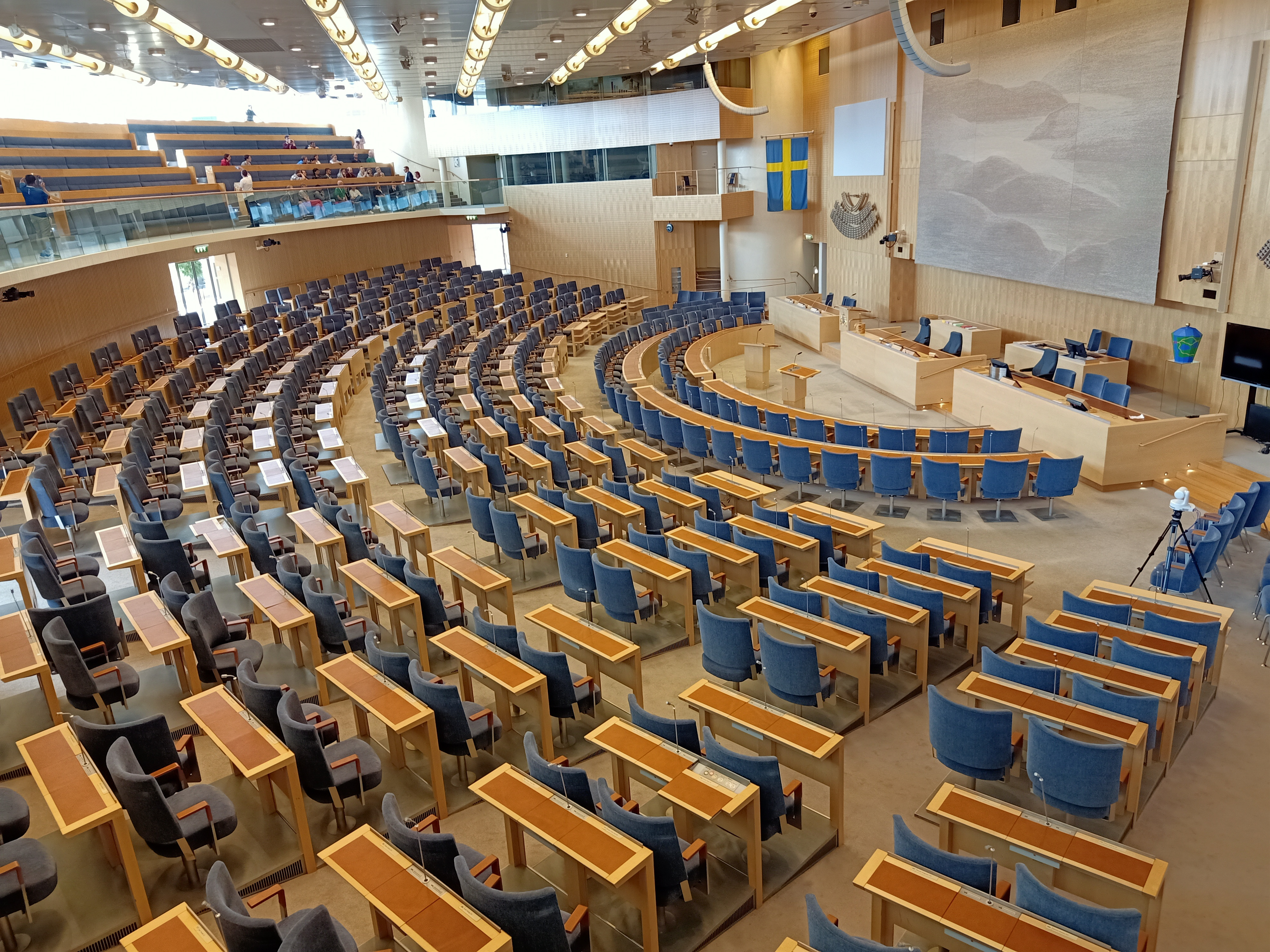
- Parliament House; Helgeandsholmen; Stockholm, 100 12; Sweden

Website
- riksdagen.se

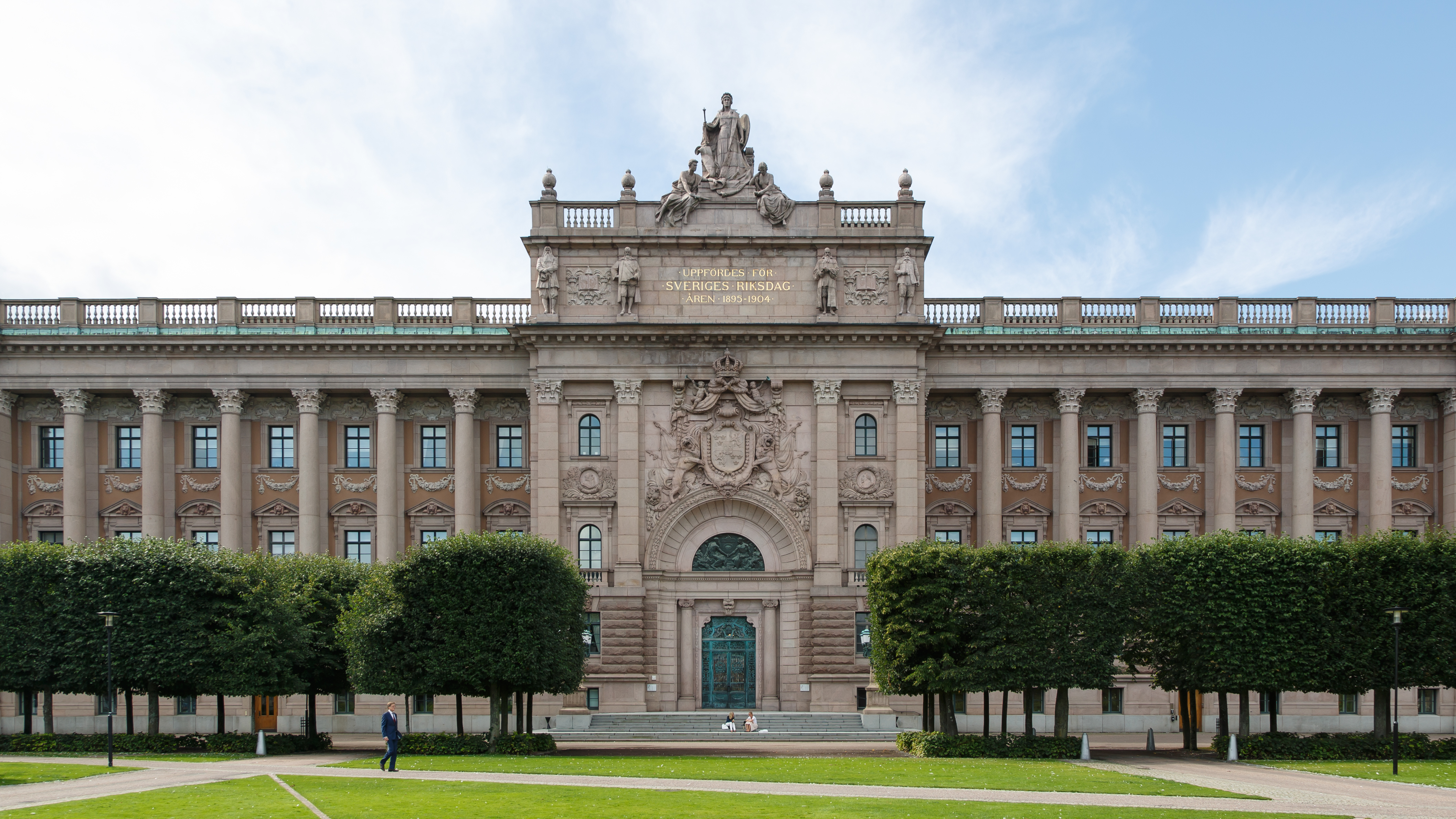
The Parliament House, seat of the Riksdag since 1905

The Riksdag (Swedish: [ˈrɪ̌ksdɑːɡ] or [ˈrɪ̌ksda], lit. 'diet of the realm' (Note: Also riksdagen [ˈrɪ̌ksdan] or Sveriges riksdag [ˈsvæ̌rjɛs ˈrɪ̌ksdɑːɡ] or [- ˈrɪ̌ksda].)) is the parliament and the supreme decision-making body of the Kingdom of Sweden. Since 1971, the Riksdag has been a unicameral parliament with 349 members (riksdagsledamöter), elected proportionally and since 1994, serving fixed four-year terms. The 2026 Swedish general election is the most recent general election.

The constitutional mandates of the Riksdag are enumerated in the Instrument of Government (Regeringsformen), and its internal workings are specified in greater detail in the Riksdag Act (Riksdagsordningen). The seat of the Riksdag is at Parliament House (Riksdagshuset), on the island of Helgeandsholmen in central Stockholm, in Gamla stan, the old town of Stockholm. The Riksdag has its institutional roots in the feudal Riksdag of the Estates, traditionally thought to have first assembled in Arboga in 1435. In 1866, following reforms of the 1809 Instrument of Government, that body was transformed into a bicameral legislature with an upper chamber (första kammaren) and a lower chamber (andra kammaren).

== Name ==
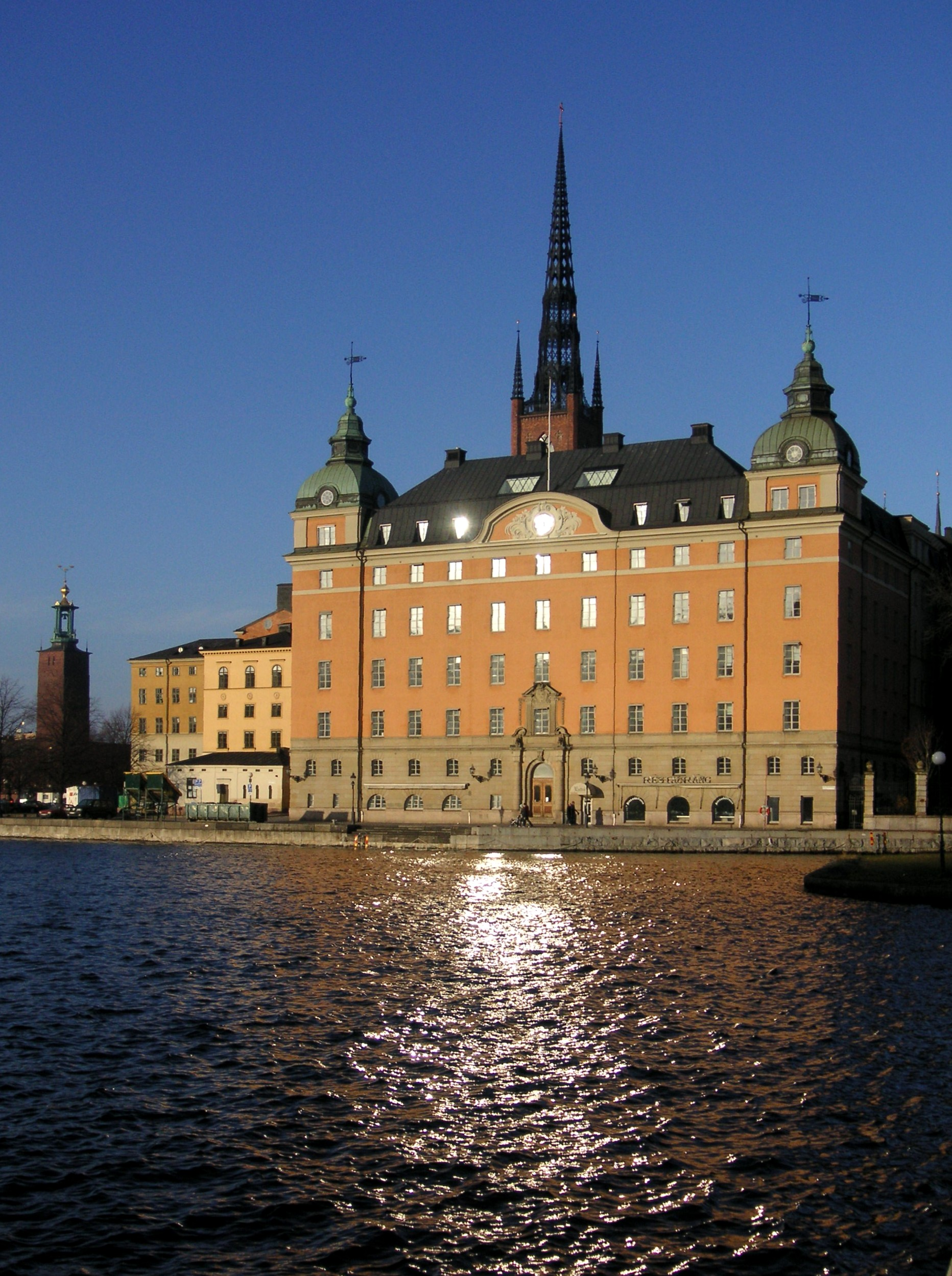
The Old Parliament House on Riddarholmen was the seat of the Riksdag from 1833 to 1905.

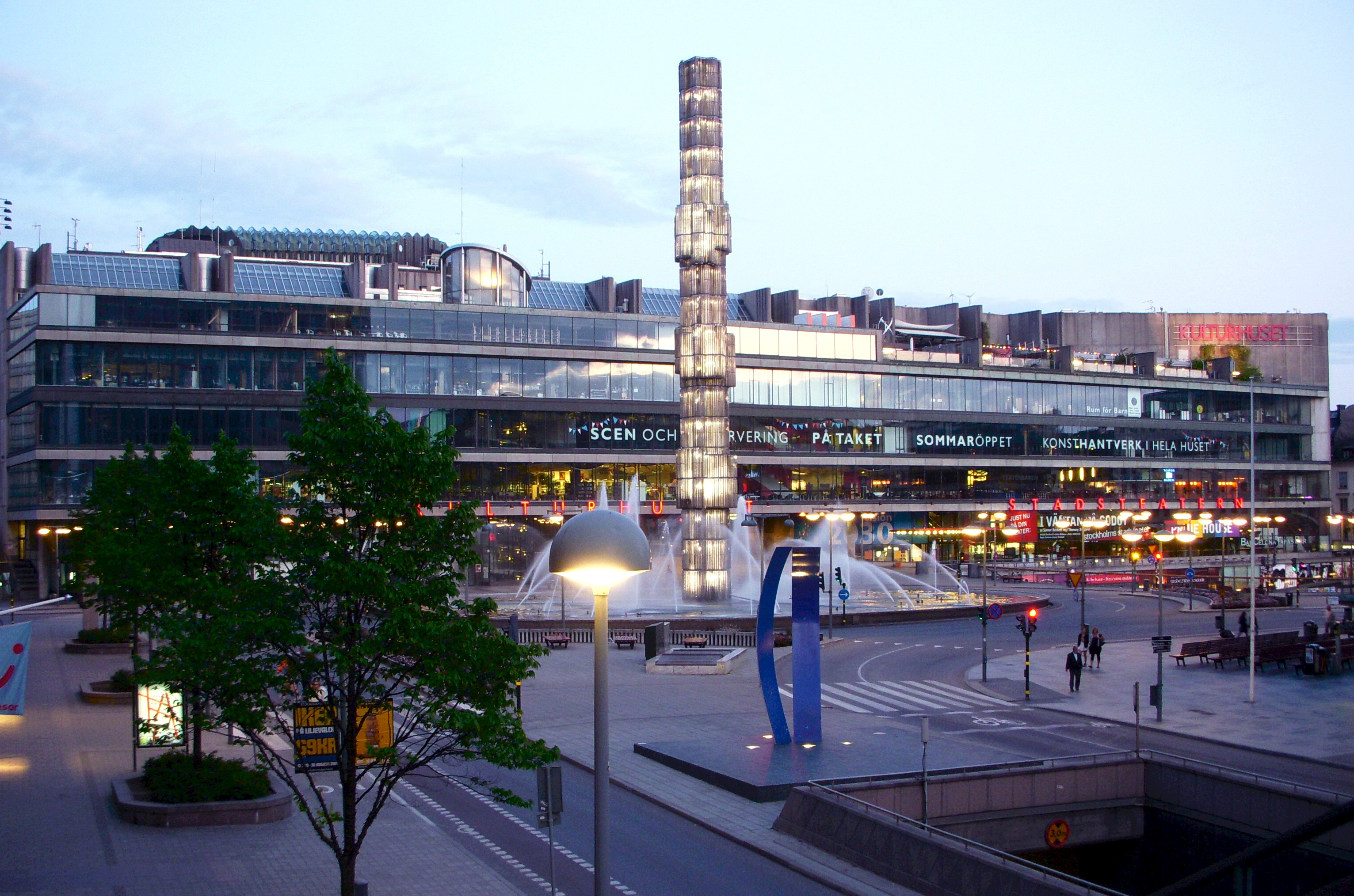
Kulturhuset at Sergels torg served as a temporary seat for the Riksdag, from 1971 to 1983, while the Riksdag building on Helgeandsholmen underwent renovation.

The Swedish word riksdag, in definite form riksdagen, is a general term for "parliament" or "assembly", but it is typically only used for Sweden's legislature and certain related institutions. In addition to Sweden's parliament, it is also used for the Parliament of Finland and the Estonian Riigikogu, as well as the historical German Reichstag and the Danish Rigsdagen. In Swedish use, riksdagen is usually not capitalised. Riksdag derives from the genitive of rike, referring to royal power, and dag, meaning diet or conference; the German word Reichstag and the Danish Rigsdag are cognate. The Oxford English Dictionary traces English use of the term "Riksdag" in reference to the Swedish assembly back to 1855.

== History ==
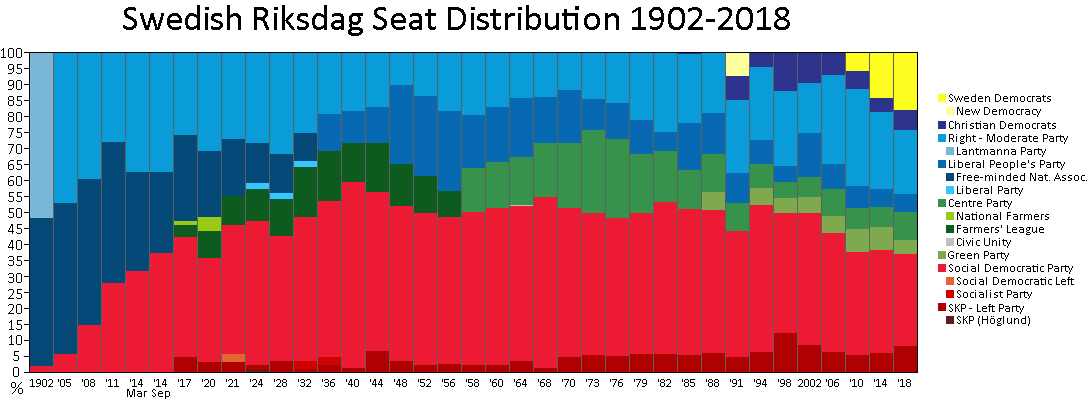
Historical distribution of seats in the Swedish Riksdag 1902–2018

The roots of the modern Riksdag can be found in a 1435 meeting in the city of Arboga; however, only three of the estates were probably present: the nobility, the clergy and the burghers. This informal organization was modified in 1527 by the first modern Swedish king, Gustav I Vasa, to include representatives from all the four social estates: the nobility, the clergy, the burghers (property-owning commoners in the towns such as merchants etc.), and the yeomanry (freehold farmers). This form of Ständestaat representation lasted until 1866, when representation by estate was abolished and the modern bicameral parliament established. Effectively, however, it did not become a parliament in the modern sense until parliamentary principles were established in the political system in Sweden in 1917.

On 22 June 1866, the Riksdag decided to reconstitute itself as a bicameral legislature, consisting of Första kammaren or the First Chamber, with 155 members and Andra kammaren or the Second Chamber with 233 members. The First Chamber was indirectly elected by county and city councillors, while the Second Chamber was directly elected by universal suffrage. This reform was a result of great discontent with the old Estates, which, following the changes brought by the beginnings of the Industrial Revolution, was no longer able to provide representation for large segments of the population.

By an amendment to the 1809 Instrument of Government, the general election of 1970 was the first to a unicameral assembly with 350 seats. The following general election to the unicameral Riksdag in 1973 gave the Government the support of only 175 members, while the opposition could mobilize an equal force of 175 members. In a number of cases a tied vote ensued, and the final decision had to be determined by lot. To avoid any recurrence of this unstable situation, the number of seats in the Riksdag was reduced to 349, from 1976 onwards.

== Powers and structure ==
The Riksdag performs the normal functions of a legislature in a parliamentary democracy. It enacts laws, amends the constitution and appoints a government. In most parliamentary democracies, the head of state commissions a politician to form a government. Under the new Instrument of Government (one of the four fundamental laws of the Constitution) enacted in 1974, that task was removed from the monarch of Sweden and given to the speaker of the Riksdag. To make changes to the Constitution under the new Instrument of Government, amendments must be approved twice, in two successive electoral periods with a regular general election held in between.

There are 15 parliamentary committees in the Riksdag.

== Membership ==
As of September 2022, 163 members, or 46.7% of the 349 members are women. Five parties have a majority representation of female MPs as of 2022: the Left Party (17 of 24, 70.8%), the Green Party (12 of 18, 66.7%), the Liberals (9 of 16, 56.3%), the Centre Party (13 of 24, 54.2%), and the Social Democratic Party (55 of 107, 51.4%). The party with the lowest share of female MPs is the Sweden Democrats (18 of 73, 24.7%).

Members of the Riksdag are full-time legislators with a base remuneration of SEK 81,400 per month, as of 1 January 2026. Committee chairs receive an additional 20% and deputy chairs receive an additional 15%.

According to a survey investigation by the sociologist Jenny Hansson, Members of the Riksdag have an average work week of 66 hours, including side responsibilities. Hansson's investigation further reports that the average member sleeps 6.5 hours per night.

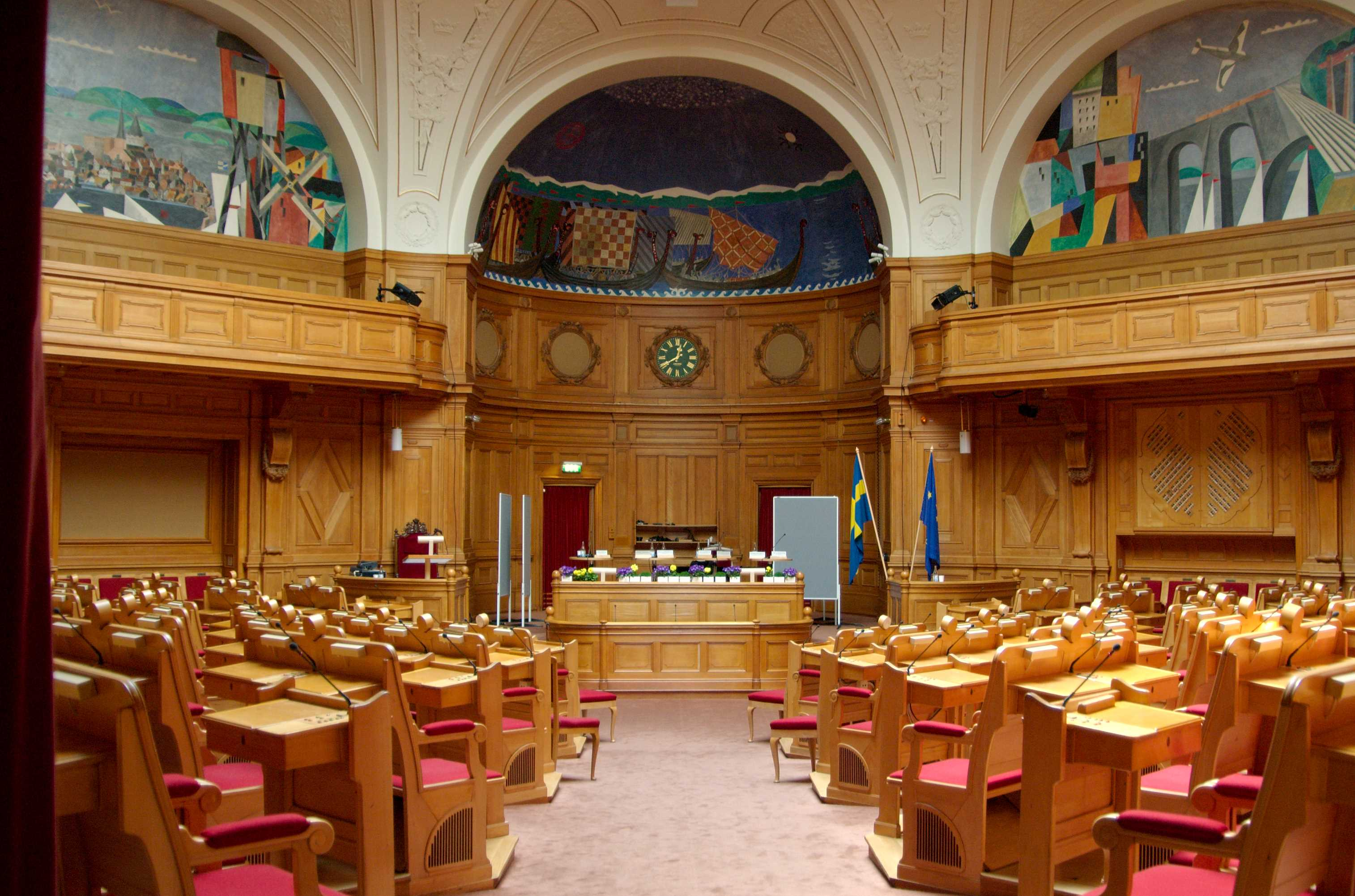
The former second chamber, nowadays used for committee meetings and conferences

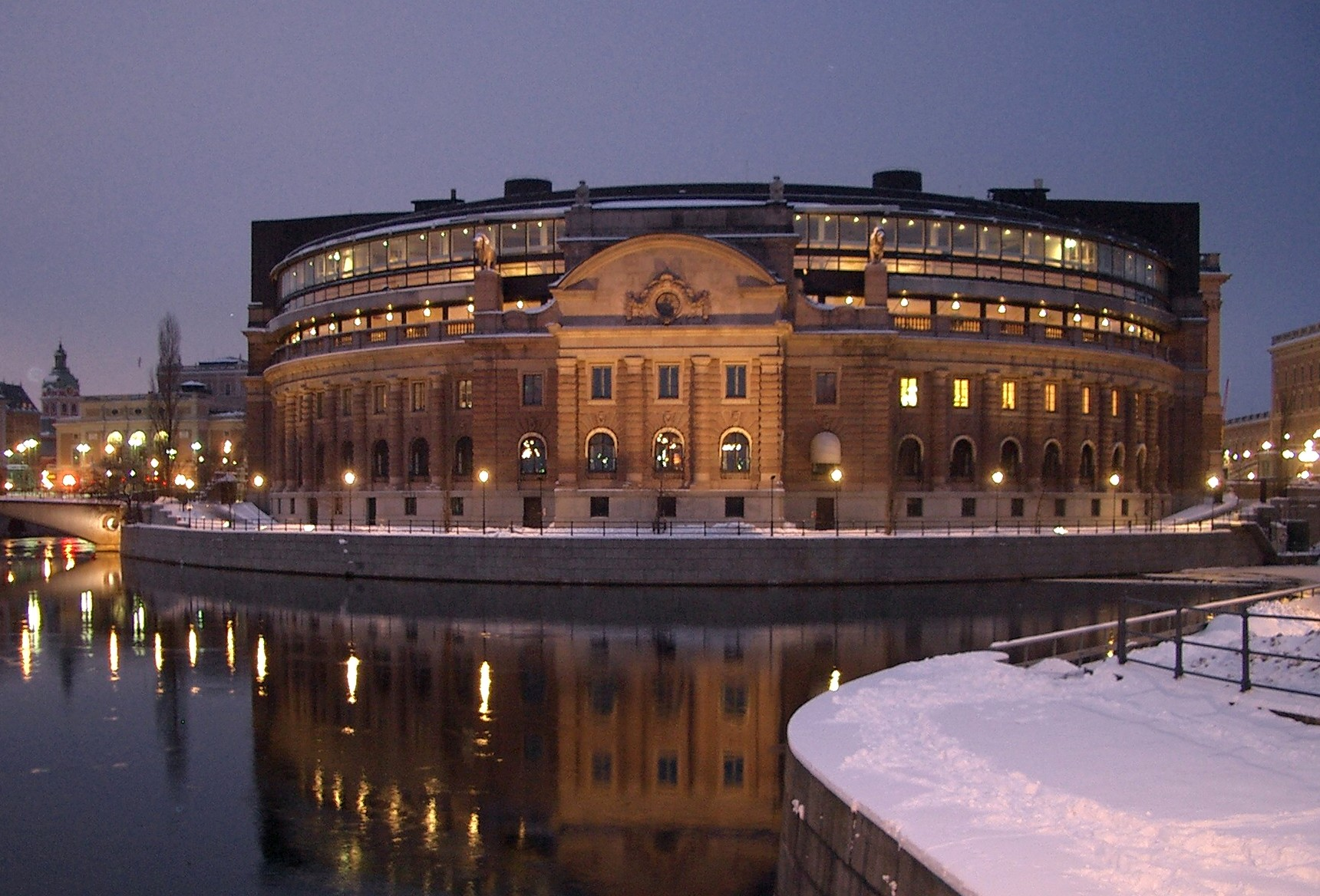
The Riksdag building exterior, from the west, at night

=== Presidium ===
The presidium consists of a speaker and three deputy speakers. They are elected for a 4-year term. The speaker is not allowed to vote, but the three deputies are allowed to vote.

== Government ==
The speaker of the Riksdag nominates a prime minister (Swedish: statsminister, literally minister of state) after holding talks with leaders of the various party groups in the Riksdag. The nomination is then put to a vote. The nomination is rejected (meaning the speaker must find a new nominee) only if an absolute majority of the members (175 members) vote "no"; otherwise, it is confirmed. This means the Riksdag can consent to a prime minister without casting any "yes" votes.

After being elected the prime minister appoints the cabinet ministers and announces them to the Riksdag. The new Government takes office at a special council held at the Royal Palace before the monarch, at which the speaker of the Riksdag formally announces to the monarch that the Riksdag has elected a new prime minister and that the prime minister has chosen his cabinet ministers.

The Riksdag can cast a vote of no confidence against any single cabinet minister (Swedish: statsråd), thus forcing a resignation. To succeed, a vote of no confidence must be supported by an absolute majority (175 members) or it has failed.

If a vote of no confidence is cast against the prime minister this means the entire government is rejected. A losing government has one week to call for a general election or else the procedure of nominating a new prime minister starts anew.

== Parties ==
No party has won a single majority in the Riksdag since 1968. Political parties with similar agendas consequently cooperate on several issues, forming coalition governments or other formalized alliances.

Two major blocs existed in parliament until 2019, the socialist/green Red-Greens and the conservative/liberal Alliance. The latter—consisting of the Moderate Party, Liberals, Centre Party, and Christian Democrats—governed Sweden from 2006 through most of 2014 (after 2010 through a minority government). The Red-Greens combination disbanded on 26 October 2010 but continued to be considered the main opposition until the 2014 election, following which the Social Democrats and the Green Party formed a government with support from the Left Party.

In 2019, after the 2018 election in which neither bloc won a majority of seats, the Social Democrats and Green Party formed a government with support from the Liberals and Centre Party, breaking the center-right Alliance. In March 2019, the Christian Democrats and Moderate Party signaled a willingness to talk with the Sweden Democrats.

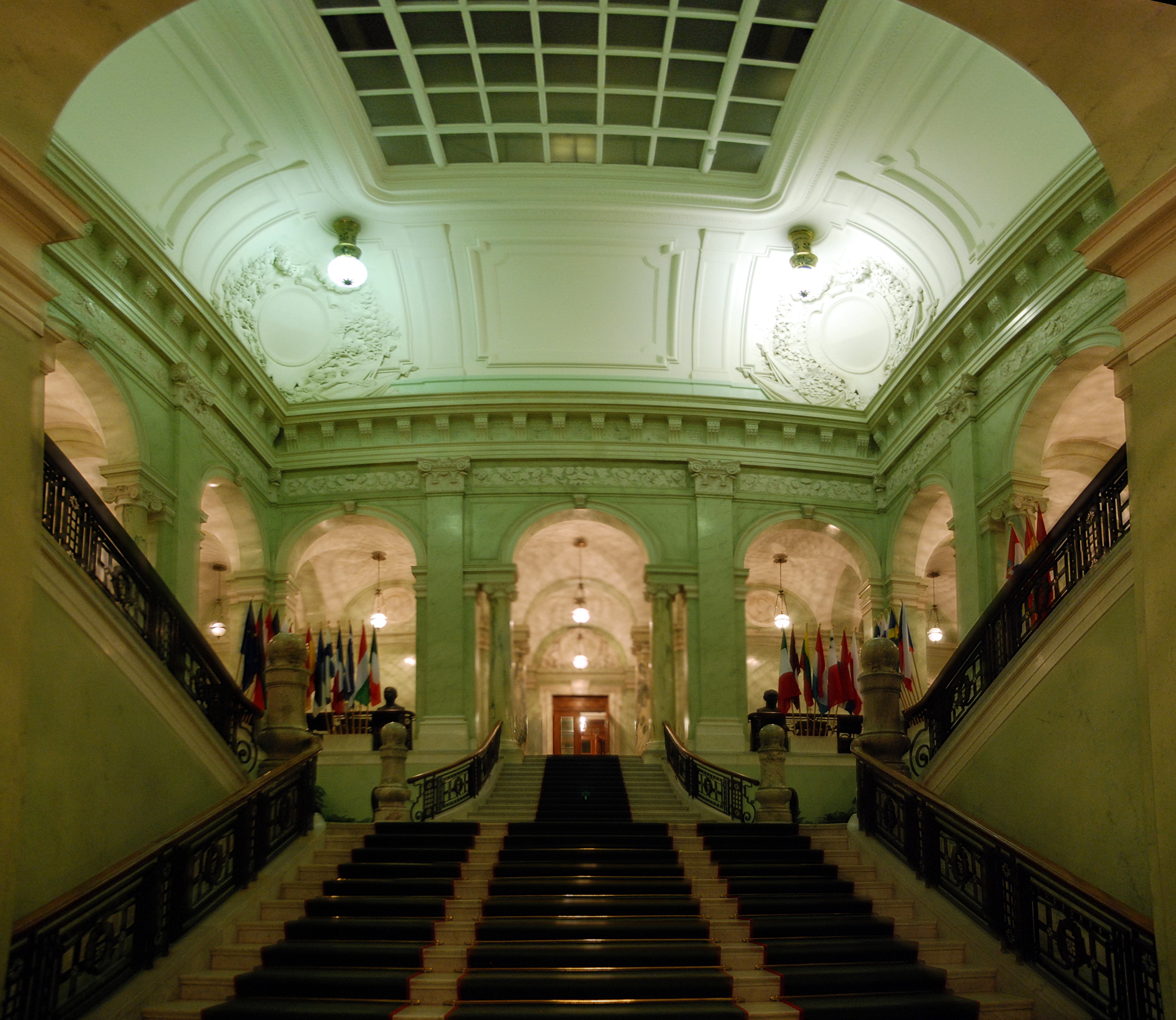
Interior of the Riksdag building

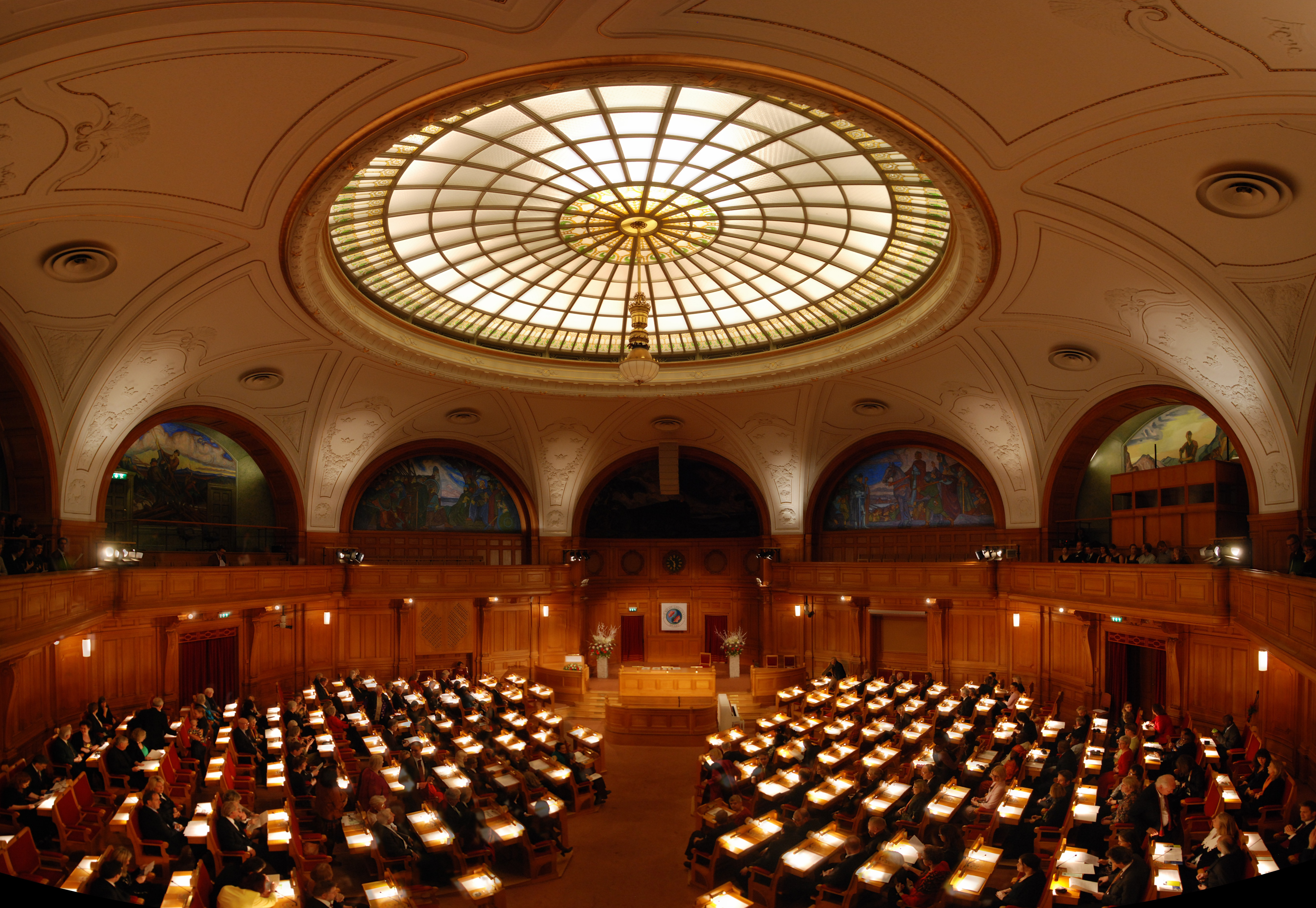
The second chamber

Current party representation in the Riksdag
Party	Leaders	Seats	Seat share (%)
Social Democratic Party	Magdalena Andersson	99	28.3
Moderate Party	Ulf Kristersson	70	20
Sweden Democrats	Jimmie Åkesson	62	17.7
Left Party	Nooshi Dadgostar	30	8.6
Centre Party	Elisabeth Thand Ringqvist	25	7.1
Christian Democrats	Ebba Busch	22	6.3
Green Party	Amanda Lind & Daniel Helldén	22	6.3
Liberals	Simona Mohamsson	19	5.4
Total		349	99.7

== Elections ==
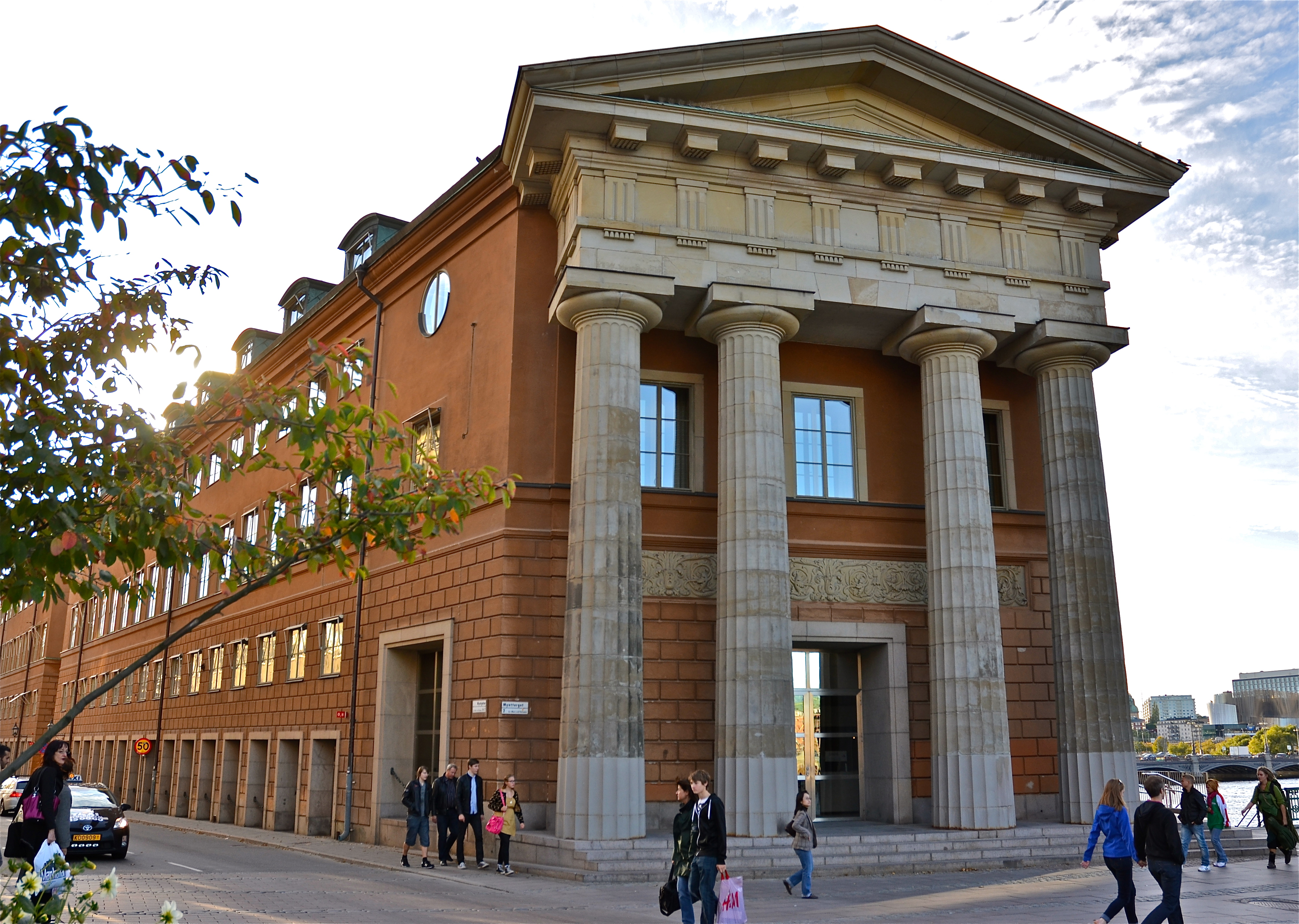
The offices of the parliament are housed in several buildings, including the former Royal Mint on Mynttorget Square.

All 349 members of the Riksdag are elected in the general elections held every four years. All Swedish citizens who turn 18 years old no later than on the day of the election and have at one point been registered residents are eligible to vote. To stand for election, a candidate must be eligible to vote and be nominated by a political party. A minimum of 4% of the national vote is required for a party to enter the Riksdag, alternatively 12% or more within a constituency. Substitutes for each deputy are elected at the same time as each election, so by-elections are rare. In the event of a snap election, the newly elected members merely serve the remainder of the four-year term.

=== Constituencies and national apportionment of seats ===
The electoral system in Sweden is proportional. Of the 349 seats in the unicameral Riksdag, 310 are fixed constituency seats allocated to 29 multi-member constituencies in relation to the number of people entitled to vote in each constituency. The remaining 39 adjustment seats are used to correct the deviations from proportional national distribution that may arise when allocating the fixed constituency seats. There is a constraint in the system that means that only a party that has received at least four per cent of the votes in the whole country participates in the distribution of seats. However, a party that has received at least twelve per cent of the votes in a constituency participates in the distribution of the fixed constituency seats in that constituency.

=== Latest election results ===
Party	Votes	%	Seats	+/–
By party
Social Democrats	1,895,989	28.02	99	–8
Moderate Party	1,343,448	19.85	70	+2
Sweden Democrats	1,183,248	17.48	62	–11
Left Party	568,781	8.40	30	+6
Centre Party	475,780	7.03	25	+1
Christian Democrats	417,490	6.17	22	+3
Green Party	414,307	6.12	22	+4
Liberals	361,187	5.34	19	+3
Örebro Party	39,644	0.59	0	New
Alternative for Sweden	26,729	0.39	0	0
Christian Values Party	9,017	0.13	0	0
Ambition Sweden	7,679	0.11	0	New
Pirate Party	7,464	0.11	0	0
Citizens' Coalition	4,118	0.06	0	0
Human Rights and Democracy	3,556	0.05	0	0
Communist Party of Sweden	2,167	0.03	0	0
Enad Röst	1,286	0.02	0	0
Nuance Party	1,069	0.02	0	0
Other parties (fewer than 1,000 votes)	4,470	0.07	–	–
Total	6,767,429	100.00	349	0
Valid votes	6,767,429	99.02		
Invalid votes	7,427	0.11		
Blank votes	59,557	0.87		
Total votes	6,834,413	100.00		
Registered voters/turnout	8,051,355	84.89		
Source: Election Authority
By bloc
Andersson's Bloc (S+MP+V+C)	3,354,857	49.57	176	+3
Kristersson's Bloc (M+SD+KD+L)	3,305,373	48.84	173	–3
Others	107,199	1.58	0	0
Total	6,767,429	100.00	349	0
Valid votes	6,767,429	99.02		
Invalid votes	7,427	0.11		
Blank votes	59,557	0.87		
Total votes	6,834,413	100.00		
Registered voters/turnout	8,051,355	84.89		
Source: Election Authority

== Historical composition ==
=== Swedish parliamentary elections (since 1911) ===
V / S / MP / C / L / M / KD / ND / SD
1911	___ / 64 / 101 / 65 / ___
1914	___ / 73 / 71 / 86 / ___
1914	___ / 87 / 57 / 86 / ___
1917	___ / 11 / 86 / 12 / 62 / 59 / ___
1920	___ / 7 / 75 / 30 / 47 / 71 / ___
1921	___ / 13 / 93 / 21 / 41 / 62 / ___
1924	___ / 5 / 104 / 23 / 33 / 65 / ___
1928	___ / 8 / 90 / 27 / 32 / 73 / 132
1932	___ / 8 / 104 / 36 / 24 / 58 / ___
1936	___ / 11 / 112 / 36 / 27 / 44 / ___
1940	___ / 3 / 134 / 28 / 23 / 42 / ___
1944	130 / 15 / 115 / 35 / 26 / 39 / 100
1948	120 / 8 / 112 / 30 / 57 / 23 / 110
1952	115 / 5 / 110 / 26 / 58 / 31 / 115
1956	112 / 6 / 106 / 19 / 58 / 42 / 119
1958	116 / 5 / 111 / 32 / 38 / 45 / 115
1960	119 / 5 / 114 / 34 / 40 / 39 / 113
1964	121 / 8 / 113 / 36 / 43 / 33 / 112
1968	128 / 3 / 125 / 39 / 34 / 32 / 105
1970	180 / 17 / 163 / 71 / 58 / 41 / 170
1973	175 / 19 / 156 / 90 / 34 / 51 / 175
1976	169 / 17 / 152 / 86 / 39 / 55 / 180
1979	174 / 20 / 154 / 64 / 38 / 73 / 175
1982	186 / 20 / 166 / 56 / 21 / 86 / 163
1985	178 / 19 / 159 / 44 / 51 / 76 / 171
1988	177 / 21 / 156 / 20 / 42 / 44 / 66 / 152
1991	154 / 16 / 138 / 31 / 33 / 80 / 26 / 25 / 170
1994	183 / 22 / 161 / 18 / 27 / 26 / 80 / 15 / 148
1998	190 / 43 / 131 / 16 / 18 / 17 / 82 / 42 / 159
2002	191 / 30 / 144 / 17 / 22 / 48 / 55 / 33 / 158
2006	171 / 22 / 130 / 19 / 29 / 28 / 97 / 24 / 178
2010	156 / 19 / 112 / 25 / 23 / 24 / 107 / 19 / 20 / 173
2014	159 / 21 / 113 / 25 / 22 / 19 / 84 / 16 / 49 / 141
2018	144 / 28 / 100 / 16 / 31 / 20 / 70 / 22 / 62 / 143
2022	173 / 24 / 107 / 18 / 24 / 16 / 68 / 19 / 73 / 176
2026	176 / 30 / 99 / 22 / 25 / 19 / 70 / 22 / 62 / 173

== See also ==
- Parliament House, Stockholm
- Referendums in Sweden
