= Left Socialist Party (Sweden) =

Left Socialist Party Vänstersocialistiska partiet
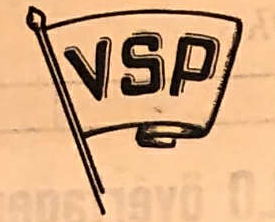
- Abbreviation: VSP
- Leader: Albin Ström
- Founded: 1940
- Dissolved: 1963
- Split from: Social Democratic Party; Socialist Party
- Newspaper: Arbetarposten
- Ideology: Libertarian socialism Democratic socialism Titoism (1950s)
- Political position: Left-wing

The Left Socialist Party (Swedish: Vänstersocialistiska partiet, VSP) was a left-wing political party in Sweden that existed between 1940 and 1963.

Albin Ström was a leftwing Social Democrat from Gothenburg who led a split from the Social Democratic Party in 1934, taking with him a few thousand members from the West Coast region. The tendency of Ström founded the daily Arbetarposten (Workers' Mail) and quickly aligned itself with Karl Kilbom and Nils Flyg's splinter Communist Party (not aligned to Moscow). These currents were united to form Socialist Party. When SP, under the leadership of Nils Flyg, gradually orientated itself towards Nazism, many of its members left the party. The tendency of Ström broke away in 1940 and formed Vänstersocialistiska Partiet, after that Flyg had promoted that the SKP were to be suppressed by the state. VSP became very much centered on Ström and his group in Gothenburg.

Arbetarposten was the main publication of the VSP, with Ström as editor. The paper was founded in 1934. During the war, it suffered from several persecutions from the government and the paper was confiscated 24 times. During the war, it had a print run of around 1,000, which rose to around 1,500 after the war. The paper was mainly distributed in Gothenburg, and to a lesser degree in Borås. Arbetarposten ceased publication in 1961. With Ström's death in 1963, the party dissolved.

In 1945, a group of VSP militants, including Evald Höglund (who later formed the trotskyist RSP) and Anton Nilson, left the party due to their perception of the party taking a pro-Western Bloc position.
