= 1940 Swedish general election =

← 1936	15 September 1940	1944 →

All 230 seats in the Andra kammaren of the Riksdag 116 seats needed for a majority
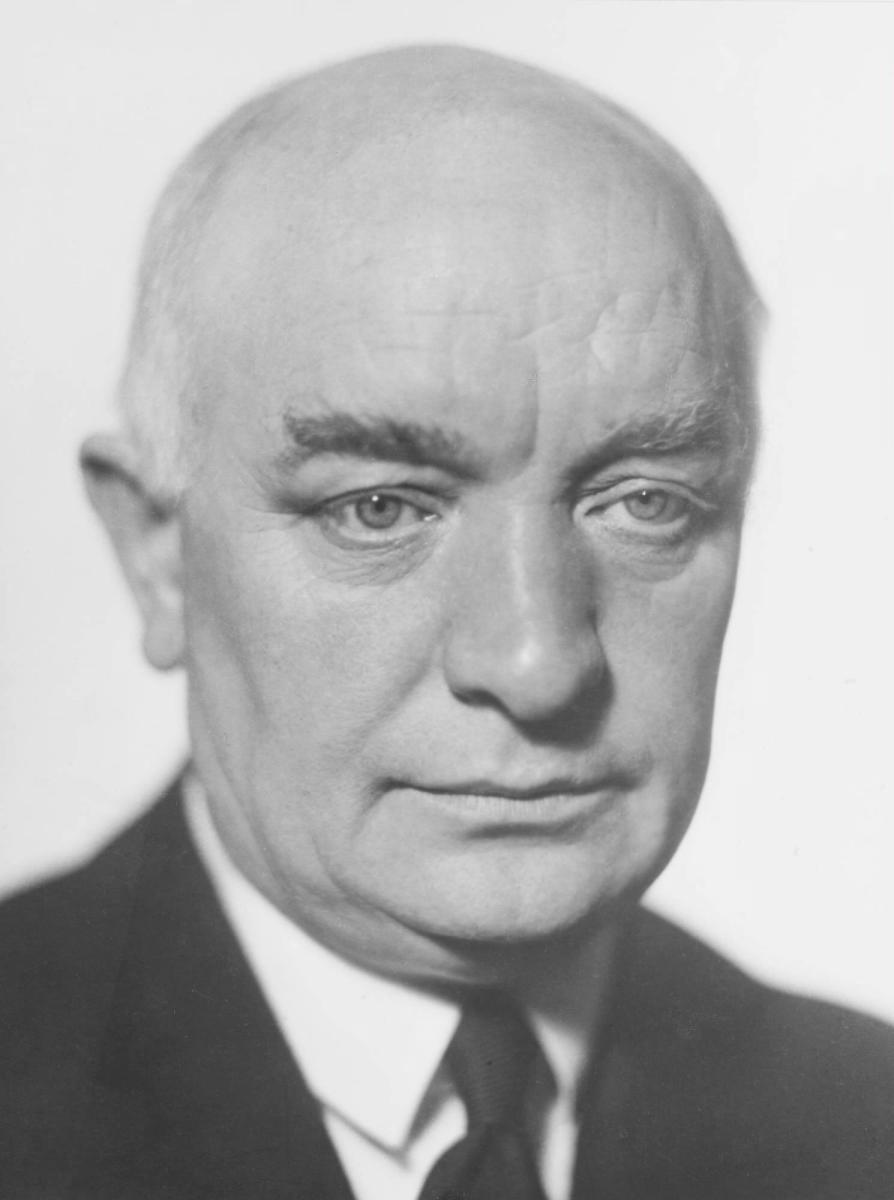

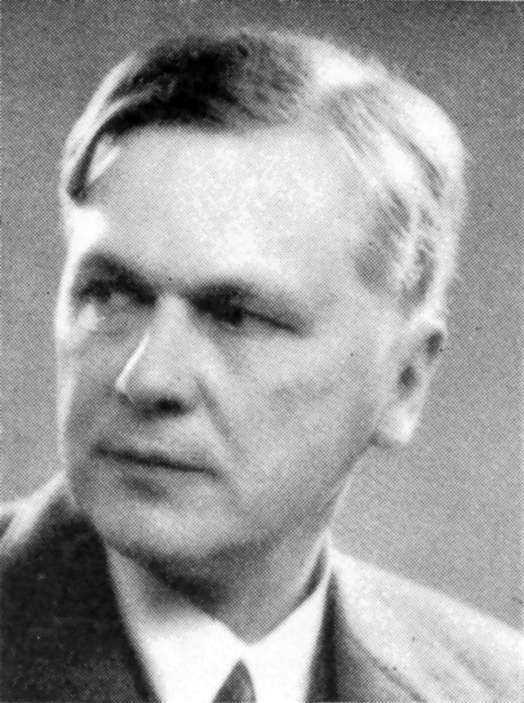

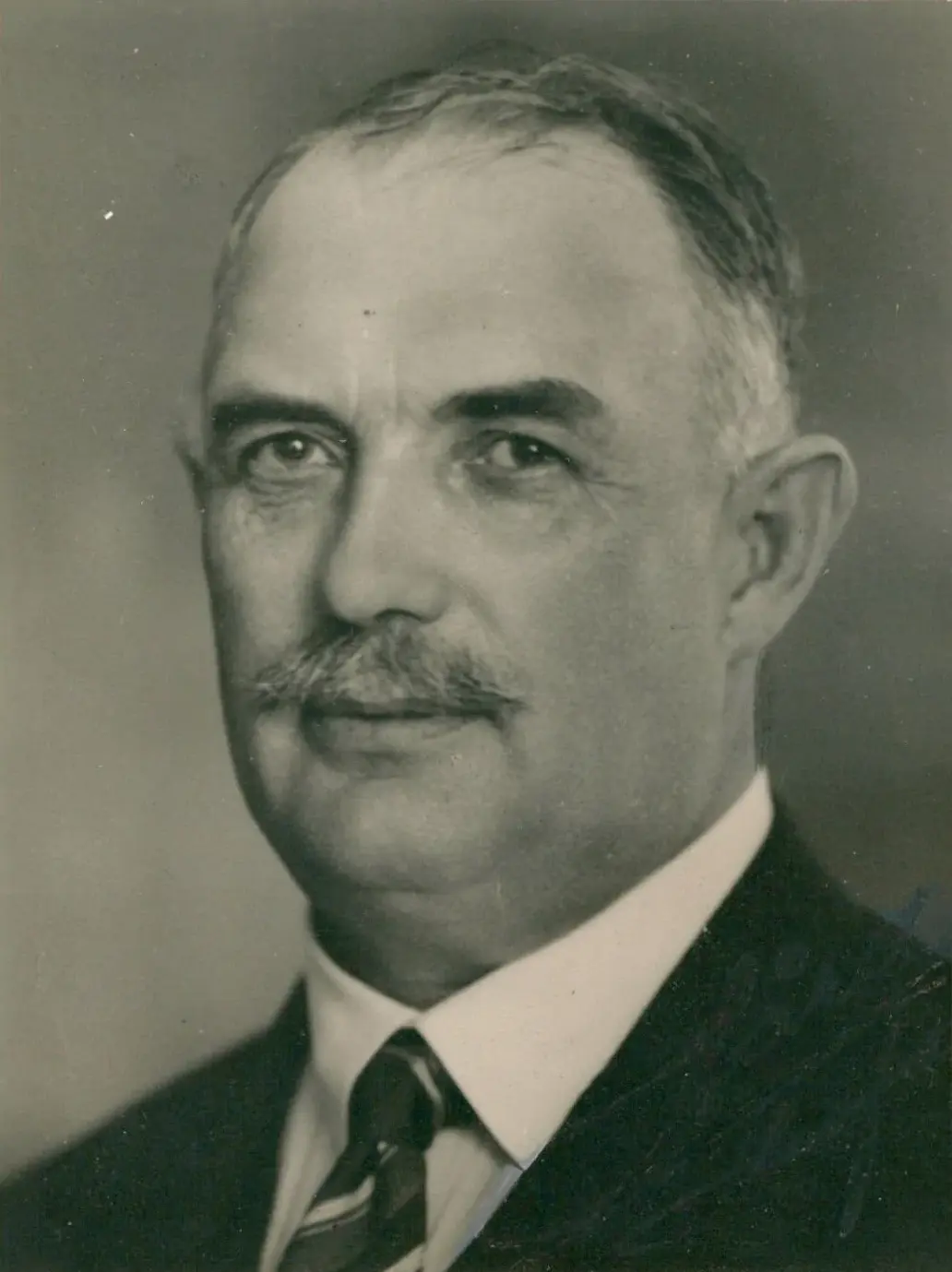

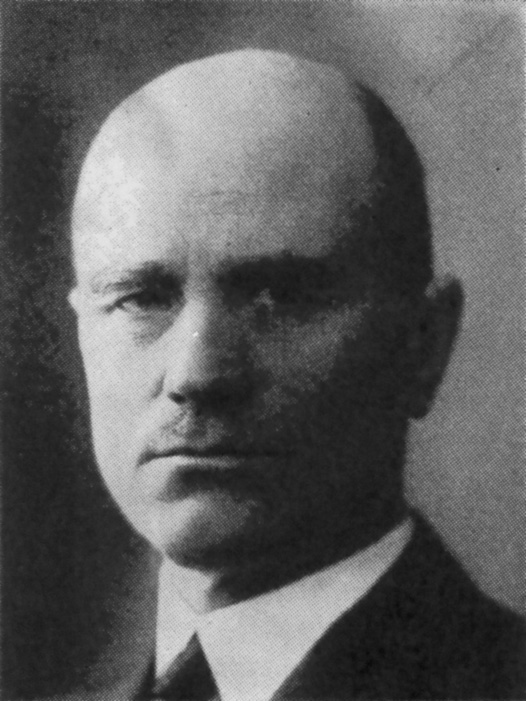

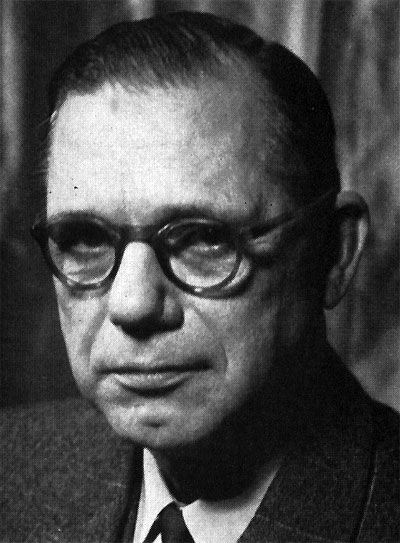
	First party	Second party	Third party
Leader	Per Albin Hansson	Gösta Bagge	Axel Pehrsson-Bramstorp
Party	Social Democrats	Right	Farmers' League
Last election	112	44	36
Seats won	134	42	28
Seat change	▲22	▼2	▼8
Popular vote	1,546,804	518,346	344,345
Percentage	53.81%	18.03%	11.98%
	Fourth party	Fifth party
Leader	Gustaf Andersson	Sven Linderot
Party	People's Party	Communist
Last election	27	5
Seats won	23	3
Seat change	▼4	▼2
Popular vote	344,113	101,424
Percentage	11.97%	3.53%
- Largest bloc and seats won by constituency
Prime Minister before election
Per Albin Hansson
Social Democrats
Elected Prime Minister
Per Albin Hansson
Social Democrats

General elections were held in Sweden on 15 September 1940. The Swedish Social Democratic Party remained the largest party, winning 134 of the 230 seats in the Andra kammaren of the Riksdag. It is one of two general elections in Swedish history where a single party received more than half of the vote (the other occasion being 1968).

The election took place amid World War II, with neighbouring Denmark and Norway occupied by the Nazis. The major parties were all represented in the government cabinet. Some of the parties called for a postponement of the elections due to the war. However, Per Albin Hansson said that democratic processes ought to be respected. Ben Arneson characterized the election as a "gentleman's election" free of mudslinging.

== Results ==
Party	Votes	%	Seats	+/–
Swedish Social Democratic Party	1,546,804	53.81	134	+22
National Organisation of the Right	518,346	18.03	42	–2
Farmers' League	344,345	11.98	28	–8
People's Party	344,113	11.97	23	–4
Communist Party	101,424	3.53	3	–2
Socialist Party	18,430	0.64	0	–6
Left Socialist Party	898	0.03	0	New
Other parties	57	0.00	0	0
Total	2,874,417	100.00	230	0
Valid votes	2,874,417	99.49		
Invalid/blank votes	14,720	0.51		
Total votes	2,889,137	100.00		
Registered voters/turnout	4,110,720	70.28		
Source: Nohlen & Stöver, SCB
