= Ture Nerman =

Swedish socialist (1886–1969)

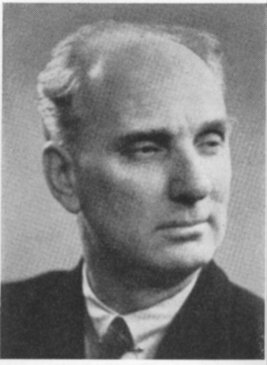
- Nerman

Member of the Riksdag
- In office 1946–1953
- In office 1931–1937

Personal details
- Born: 18 May 1886 Norrköping, Sweden
- Died: 7 October 1969 (aged 83) Stockholm, Sweden
- Resting place: Norra Begravningsplatsen
- Party: Swedish Social Democratic Party (1939–1969 & 1908–1917); Socialist Party (1929–1937); Communist Party of Sweden (1917–1929)
- Relatives: Einar Nerman (brother); Birger Nerman (brother)

Ture Nerman (18 May 1886 – 7 October 1969) was a Swedish journalist, author, and political activist. He also wrote poems and songs.

Nerman was a vegetarian and a strict teetotaler. Alcoholism was a major social problem in Sweden in the early 20th century, and Nerman considered alcohol to be a drug that made the working class passive instead of fighting for better conditions.

Ture Nerman had younger twin brothers, the artist Einar Nerman and the archeologist Birger Nerman.

== Early life ==
Nerman grew up in a middle-class family in the working-class, industrial city of Norrköping. His father owned a bookstore in the city and had married an employee who was many years younger: she became the mother of Ture and his two younger brothers. As a boy, Nerman loved reading the books at his fathers store, especially western books about cowboys and Indians.

Nerman graduated from Norrköping gymnasium (secondary school) in 1903 at the age of 17. On his graduation day he took his school bible and tossed it in the Motala ström river. In his autobiography, Nerman describes this as his first revolutionary action. Some years later when he was asked by the Swedish Social Democratic Party's leader Hjalmar Branting what had made him a socialist, Nerman answered that it had been the questioning of religion.

After graduation he moved to Uppsala to study at Uppsala University.

== Political awakening ==
The year 1905 saw both a revolution in Russia and revolutionary development in Scandinavia as Norway declared itself independent from the rule of the Swedish crown. These changes radicalized Nerman politically to the left. He had already started reading August Strindberg, Leo Tolstoy and Ellen Key. Soon he would discover Karl Marx (even if it took many years until he fully started to study and understand Marxism). Nerman started going to socialist youth meetings in Uppsala.

In 1907, Nerman was conscripted for military service. By his own request, he got medical training. Nerman had already developed an anti-militarist standpoint and in 1908 he was caught by the secret police handing out illegal anti-militarist leaflets. He was first convicted to jail, but the penalty was altered to a 300 kronor fine. His father sent him the money, but the rebellious son used it to finance a trip to Paris, where he stayed a couple of weeks. Upon returning to Sweden he was once again sent money by his father to pay off the fine to avoid going to jail.

In 1909, Nerman moved to the northern city of Sundsvall where he started working as a writer for a Social Democratic newspaper called Nya Samhället (New society). At this point Nerman had already gotten a couple of his poetry books published. Many of these were radical, provocative poems, aimed against the church, the Swedish king and the bourgeoisie.

Nerman joined the Swedish Social Democratic Party and soon became part of the left wing together with Zeth Höglund. He became one of the leaders of the left opposition of the party against its reformist leader Hjalmar Branting.

On New Year's Day in 1912, and the following weeks, Nerman and some of his Swedish friends went to Germany to follow Karl Liebknecht during his election campaign. Nerman had met Liebknecht briefly a couple of years earlier on a socialist gathering in Stockholm, but this time they got to know each other well. In his autobiography, Nerman writes that he was surprised and impressed to learn that Liebknecht could speak almost fluent Swedish and liked to sing songs by Bellman.

== World War I and Zimmerwald ==
In November 1912, Nerman attended the special emergency convention of the Socialist International, which had been summoned to Basel in Switzerland, due to the outbreak of the Balkan Wars. At the convention, the leaders of all the European Socialist parties agreed to stand together internationally to prevent any future wars. With a united international working class, they stated, there could be no more wars.

Therefore, the outbreak of World War I in 1914, and the collapse of the Socialist International, came as a shock to Nerman. Almost all the leaders of the European Socialist Parties suddenly sided with their bourgeoisie governments in support of the war, and turned against their former Socialist allies. Workers were killing workers on the battlefields.

But there were exceptions. His friend Karl Liebknecht stood alone in the Berlin Reichstag, and against 110 of his own party members, when he voted against German war credits. Learning of Liebknecht's action, Nerman knew which side he was on.

Together with his friend Zeth Höglund, Nerman represented the Swedish-Norwegian members of the Zimmerwald Conference. It united the remaining international socialist anti-war movement, whose more prominent leaders were Vladimir Lenin, Grigory Zinoviev and Leon Trotsky from Russia, Robert Grimm from Switzerland, and Rosa Luxemburg and Karl Liebknecht from Germany. Those two could not participate, but sent their greetings and support. Luxemburg was in jail for anti-war propaganda, while Liebknecht had been mobilized by the German military to dig trenches on the frontline. Returning to Sweden, Höglund was also sentenced to jail for his activities in the international anti-war movement, even though Sweden didn't participate in the World War.

== In America ==
At the start of the year 1915, (before Zimmerwald), Nerman travelled around in the United States for several months. To finance the trip he wrote articles for several Swedish newspapers. He arrived by boat in New York City where he stayed only for a short time but took the chance to go up to the top of the Woolworth Building, the highest skyscraper in the world at the time. He took the express train across the continent to San Francisco where he visited the World's Fair on opening day.

Nerman then started a tour speaking to American workers, mostly of Scandinavian origin, in Minneapolis and Chicago.

He also took some time to visit some relatives in Astoria, Oregon.

When Nerman returned in the mid summer to Sweden, Höglund complained, asking if it really had been necessary of him to go to America when he was so much needed at home in the intensifying class battle and the struggle within the Swedish Social Democratic Party between the left wing and the right wing.

== The birth of Swedish Communism ==
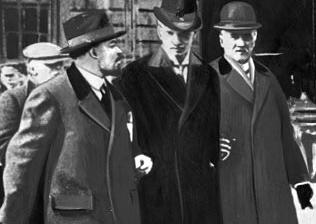
Lenin, Nerman and Carl Lindhagen in Stockholm April 1917.

At the beginning of 1917, the struggle between the left and the right within the Social Democratic Party resulted in a split. Höglund and Nerman, now considering themselves Communists, were expelled from the Party together with other prominent radicals such as Kata Dalström, Fredrik Ström and Stockholm's mayor Carl Lindhagen.

Höglund, who was the leader of the Party's youth organisation, managed to get the whole young socialists on his side in the foundation of the Swedish Social Democratic Left Party. The new party was formed in May 1917 and had around 20,000 members. It would soon change name and become the first Communist Party of Sweden. They launched a newspaper, Politiken, in which they wrote and published texts by other international communist leaders.

In April 1917, when Lenin passed through Stockholm on his journey from exile in Switzerland home to Petrograd, Nerman was one of those who greeted Lenin and took care of him while there. For instance, the Swedish Communists took Lenin to the PUB department store, where they bought him a brand-new suit so he would look good and clean coming back home to Russia.

Upon Lenin's return in Russia and the October Revolution that followed, Nerman and the Left Social Democrats fully supported the Bolsheviks and agitated for a similar Communist revolution in Sweden.

As an international representative of the Swedish Communist Party, Nerman had several communist contacts from all over the world: His friend Karl Liebknecht; Karl Radek, the Polish Bolshevik who had lived in Stockholm for a while; The Ukrainian-Italian socialist leader Angelica Balabanoff, who lived and worked in Stockholm; and Yrjö Sirola and Otto Kuusinen, two prominent Finnish communist leaders visited Nerman in Stockholm several times.

Nerman also corresponded with the American socialist leaders Eugene V. Debs, John Reed (who helped him write a book on the first World War (Folkhatet)) and the American communist leader Max Eastman, who provided Nerman with a subscription to The Liberator.

== In Soviet Russia ==
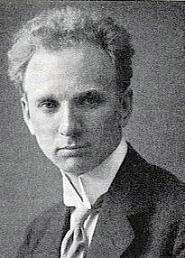
Young Nerman

At the end of the summer of 1918, Nerman traveled together with Angelica Balabanoff and Anton Nilson to Bolshevik Russia.

In Petrograd, Nerman was invited two visit the home of Zinoviev, who was the leader of the Petrograd Soviet. They knew each other from Zimmerwald. Zinoviev asked him: "When will you make revolution in Sweden?" Nerman replied modestly that they did not have a definitive date yet. The next day Nerman attended a rally outside the Winter Palace, in which Zinoviev and Balabanoff spoke to the red soldiers heading out to fight in the civil war.

After spending some days in Petrograd, the trip continued to Moscow, where Nerman was greeted by Kamenev and his wife, the sister of Trotsky. Nerman was welcomed to live with the Kamenev family at the Kremlin.

On 3 October, Nerman attended a grand meeting at the Bolshoi Theatre. Amongst the speakers were Sverdlov, Radek, Bukharin and the main speaker Trotsky. Lenin, who recently had been shot and wounded, could not attend, but his greetings were received with cheers and applause. Afterwards Nerman spoke briefly with Trotsky who was in a hurry to go out and fight in the Civil War the same night. Nerman mentioned that the Swedish press, and even the Social Democratic newspapers, wrote almost every day that the Soviet government was about to fall, but still it remained. "Yes," answered Trotsky with a stern smile, "and we will remain."

The day after, Nerman got to sit down with Bukharin for a long interview, in which Bukharin expressed his optimism in the world revolution and socialist future. The same day he met with Alexandra Kollontay, the female Bolshevik leader, who later would be the Soviet ambassador to Sweden.

Nerman returned to Sweden through the Finnish archipelago in late October. The positive energies he had massed from his experience in revolutionary Russia were replaced with devastation after hearing of the failed German revolution of 1918/1919, and the murdering of Karl Liebknecht and Rosa Luxemburg.

Nerman made his second trip to Russia with Otto Grimlund in the spring of 1920, where he got to meet with Lenin, this time as the guest, after having been the host in Stockholm April 1917.

Upon returning to Sweden in the summer he learned about the death of his father. His family had tried to delay the funeral, but still he had missed it.

Nerman would make one more trip to Russia, in 1927. It was the tenth anniversary of the revolution. Lenin was dead now and things had started to change.

== Against Stalinism ==
Nerman condemned the rise of Stalinism in Russia, but when Höglund broke with the Communist Party in 1924, Nerman remained, although less involved in the leadership. The party's new leadership was composed of Karl Kilbom and Nils Flyg.

In 1929, the Comintern made sure that the power of the Swedish Communist Party was taken over by the minority fraction of Stalinists led by Hugo Sillén. The majority of the party's members, the non-Stalinists, were expelled, including Nerman, Karl Kilbom and Nils Flyg. The minority (Stalinists) seized the party's headquarter and its archives, but the majority (non-Stalinists) managed to keep control over the newspaper Politiken.

The majority, under the leadership of Kilbom, tried to keep running a Swedish Communist Party independent from Moscow. In 1934 this party took the name Socialist Party (Socialistiska partiet).

In 1931 Nerman, 44 years old, was elected to the first chamber of the Riksdag, where he served till 1937 as a representative of the independent communist Party. When he held speeches in the chamber, he usually tried to make them into poems.

== In Franco's Spain ==
In 1937, Nerman and his friend August Spångberg, traveled to Spain where General Francisco Franco's National faction had taken power and a civil war was ravaging the country. They went through Nazi Germany and managed to get to Barcelona. The civil war was a chaos. At times the Stalinists were fighting the Trotskyists, and at other times the Anarchists were fighting everyone. The Nationalists under Francisco Franco benefited from the massive support of Nazi-Germany (financial and military: Legion Condor) and fascist Italy.

On 3 May, serious fighting between the different leftist groups broke out in Barcelona, and Hotel Victoria, where the Swedes were staying, was caught in the crossfire which lasted for three days. At the same hotel, Nerman for the first time met Willy Brandt, (the German Social Democrat who would later live in exile Sweden during World War II and after that become Chancellor of West Germany.) On 7 May, the fighting in Barcelona was over with more than 500 dead and over 1,500 wounded.

Afterwards, by orders from the Comintern, Stalinist press all over the world would claim that the Swedish "Trotskyist Fascists" Nerman and August Spångberg were the masterminds of the battle in Barcelona. Nerman wrote in his autobiography: "I was falsely accused by the Stalinists of being in a pact with Hitler. But in reality, not much more than a year later, Stalin himself would be in a pact with Hitler."

When he returned home to Sweden from the chaos in Spain he was met by a chaos in his own Socialist Party, the independent communist party.

Nils Flyg had taken power and expelled the former party leader Karl Kilbom. Flyg wanted Nerman to stay but he didn't like the development of the party and left voluntarily. (A couple of years later, Nils Flyg would suddenly become pro-Nazi and take the Socialist Party with him on this new course.)

For the next two years Nerman was without a party and he also lost his seat in the Parliament. In 1939, choosing the date of First of May, Nerman re-joined the Swedish Social Democratic Party.

== World War II ==
On 20 April 1933, a couple of months after Hitler had taken power in Germany, Nerman stood up in the Swedish parliament and demanded that Sweden should grant asylum for all German Jews who would like to come. The issue was taken up for vote, but voted against.

When World War II broke out in 1939 Sweden declared itself neutral, but Nerman was not neutral. During the war, Nerman was best known as the editor of Trots allt! (Despite Everything!), an anti-Nazi paper that caused furor at the German Embassy in Stockholm. Trots allt! also criticized the Swedish government for, out of fear of Hitler, allowing German troop transports through Sweden. At its peak, the weekly paper achieved a circulation of 66,000 in 1942.

The paper borrowed its name from a text by Karl Liebknecht, Trotz alledem!, which he wrote on the day before he was murdered in 1919.

At first the Swedish government did not tolerate Trots Allt! since it broke with the neutrality. Many of Nerman's anti-war and anti-Nazi writings of this time were not allowed to be published by the censorship. Nerman was even sentenced to jail for three months in the winter of 1939. But the paper was very popular and a lot of financial help came in from supporters.

In 1940, Nerman was sentenced to three months in prison by Swedish authorities for writing an article in "Trots Allt!" where Nerman claimed that Hitler had ordered a 1939 bombing and assassination attempt in a Münich beer cellar. Nerman was a parliamentarian at the time of his conviction.

One of Nerman's closest collaborators in those days was Israel Holmgren, who also was sentenced to jail.

At the end of 1942, Nerman ran into his former friend Nils Flyg in the streets of Stockholm. Nils Flyg had developed into a Nazi supporter. Nerman asked him: "What are you going to do now?" Flyg said: "I'm going to save Sweden – and I'm going to save you too!" Nerman gave him an ironic "Thank you." They never saw each other again: only a couple of weeks later Nils Flyg died.

On 7 May 1945 Nazi Germany finally surrendered. On 16 May, Nerman went to the liberated Norway together with a group of Norwegian refugees returning from their exile in Sweden. Trots Allt! had been a great supporter of the Norwegian freedom struggle against the Nazi occupation and smuggled in illegal issues of the paper had been were popular amongst the Norwegians.

== Later years ==
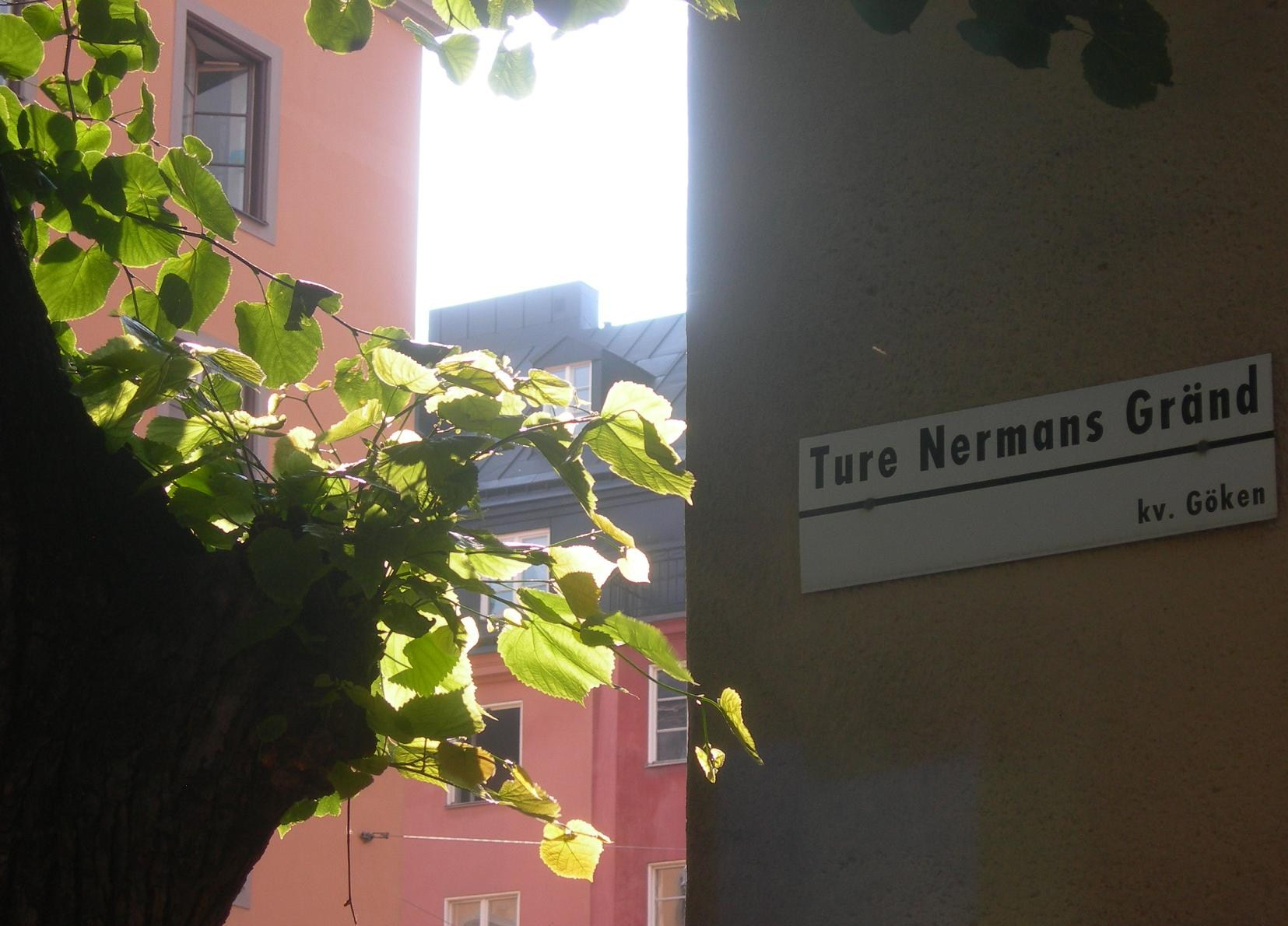
Ture Nermans gränd (Ture Nerman's alley) in Stockholm

Nerman had a seat in the parliament 1946–1953. He retired after that, at 67 years of age. For the next three years (1954–1957) Nerman served as publisher of the bimonthly magazine Kulturkontakt, a publication of the CIA-backed Congress of Cultural Freedom and the Svenska kommittén för kulturens frihet (Swedish Committee for Cultural Freedom).

Nerman was a member of the first board of the Sweden–Israel Friendship Association in 1953.

This confirms his positive opinions about the United States and the United Nations. He even became an advocate of Swedish membership in NATO. The red Soviet flag with the hammer and the sickle outside his house in Blidö, an island in the Stockholm archipelago, was an ironic reference to his earlier beliefs.

He died in 1969.

Nerman has a small street named after him in Kungsholmen, Stockholm (Ture Nermans gränd), as well as in Bergen and Namsos, Norway (Ture Nermans vei).

== Works ==
- Folkhatet (1918) – a study of World War I.
- Mänskligheten på marsch – (The Human Race on the March) – a Marxist perspective of the history of mankind.
- Kommunisterna: från Komintern till Kominform - (The Communists: from Comintern to Cominform) a critical view of the development of international communism from Lenin to Stalin. (1949).
- Ture Nerman wrote a biographical book about Joe Hill, the Swedish-American labor activist and political folk singer. Ture Nerman also translated most of Joe Hill's songs to Swedish.
- Ture Nerman also wrote a biography about Cyrano de Bergerac in 1919.
- Ture Nerman's three volume autobiography is called Allt var ungt (Everything Was Young), Allt var rött (Everything Was Red) and Trots allt! (Despite Everything!).
- Nerman wrote a book about his journey in America called I vilda västern (In the Wild West) and a book about his travels in revolutionary Russia called I vilda östern (In the Wild East). He also wrote a book about some of his other political journeys, including to Germany and Zimmerwald, called Röda resor (Red Trips).
- Nerman wrote several volumes of poetry. Mostly love poems or political revolutionary ones, and sometimes love and politics combined, like in Den vackraste visan om kärleken (The most beautiful love song), about a soldier who dies in the world war. He also wrote songs, including for the Swedish revue star Ernst Rolf. Nerman also worked closely with Karl Gerhard in the 1930s.
- Nerman translated a lot of Marxist literature from German to Swedish, especially by Franz Mehring.
