= 1944 Swedish general election =

- 17 September 1944

All 230 seats in the Andra kammaren of the Riksdag 116 seats needed for a majority
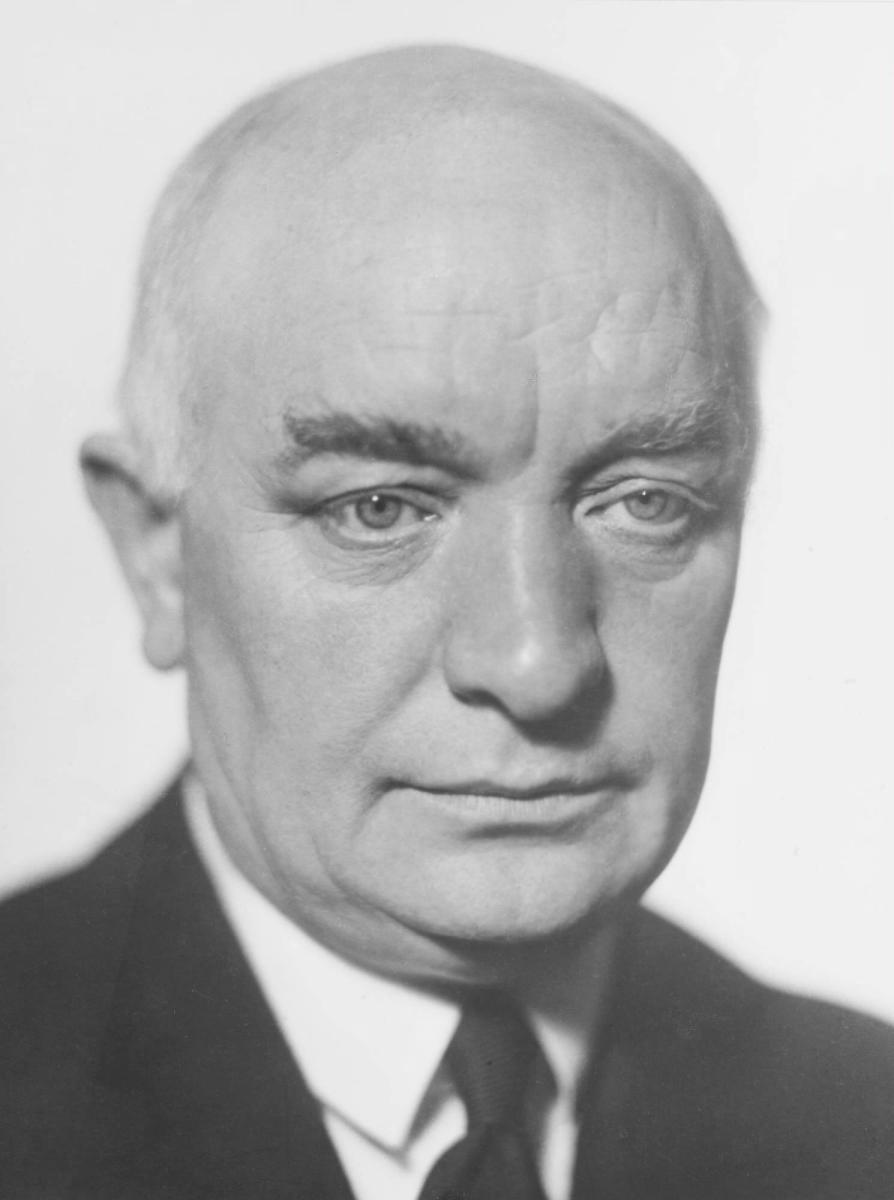

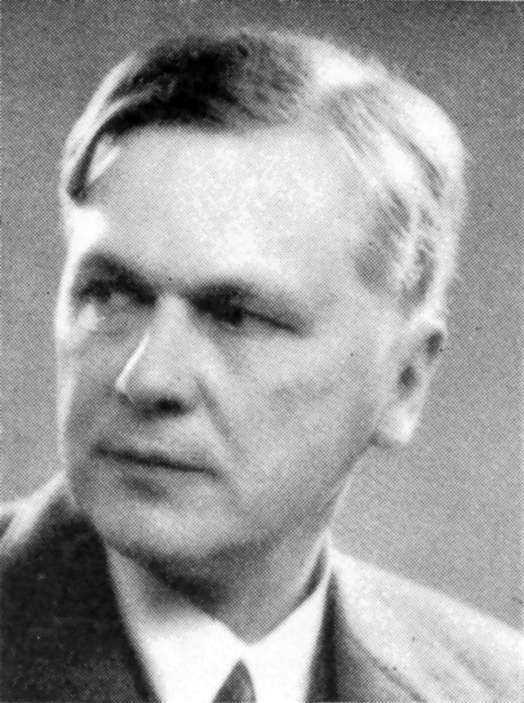

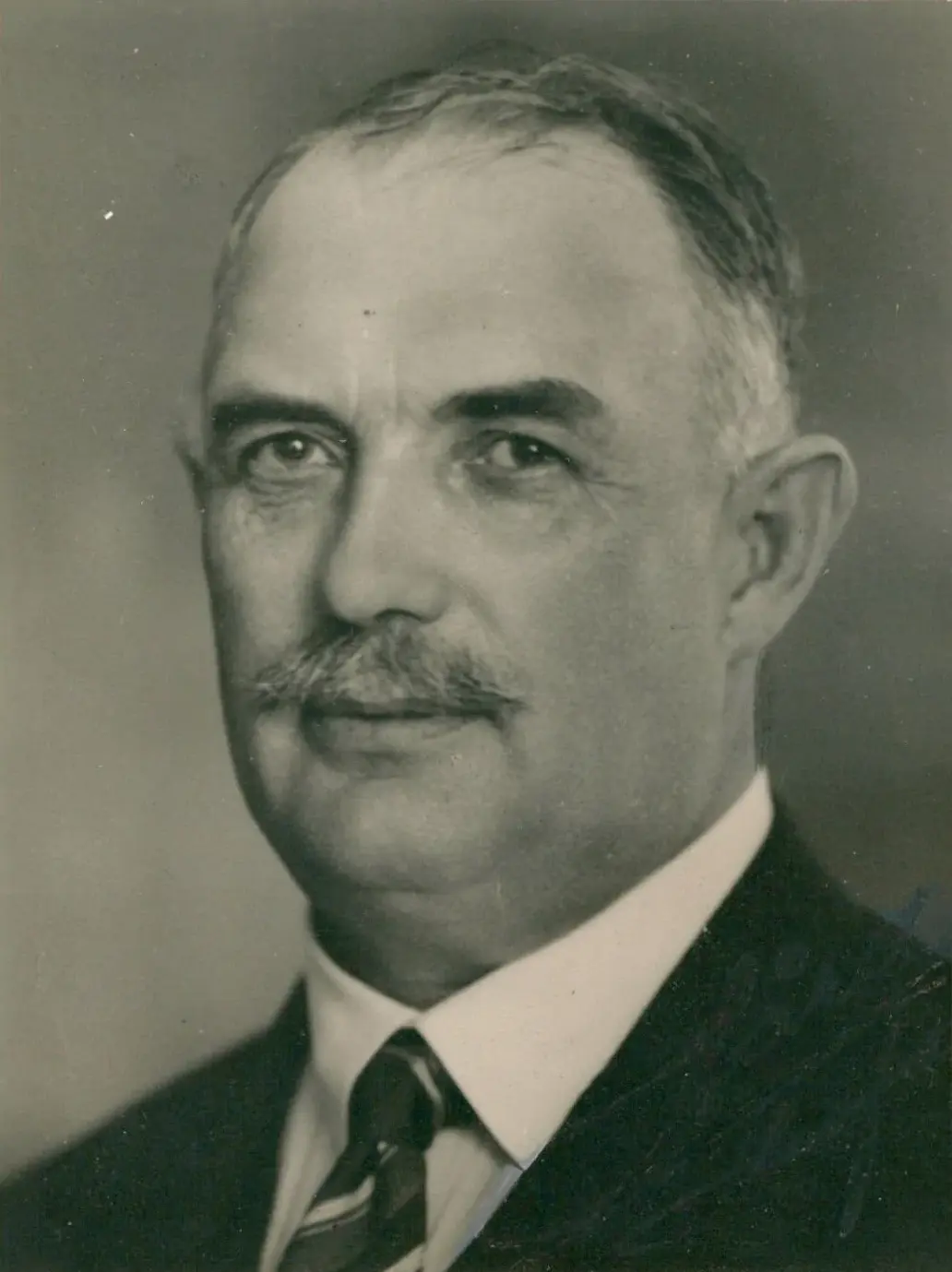

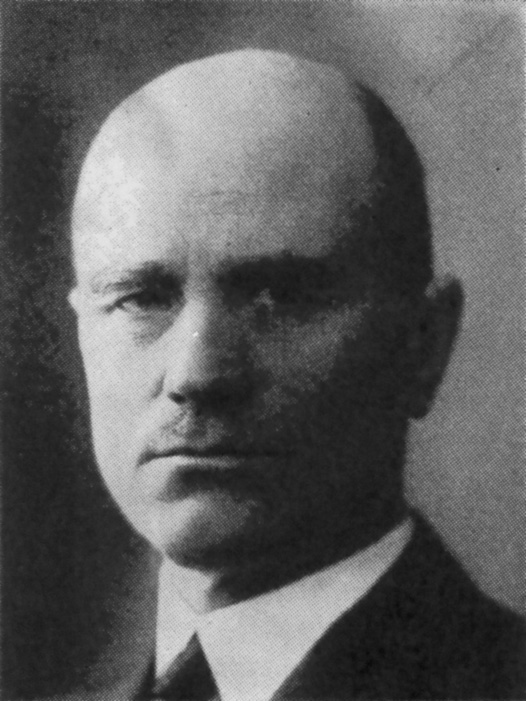

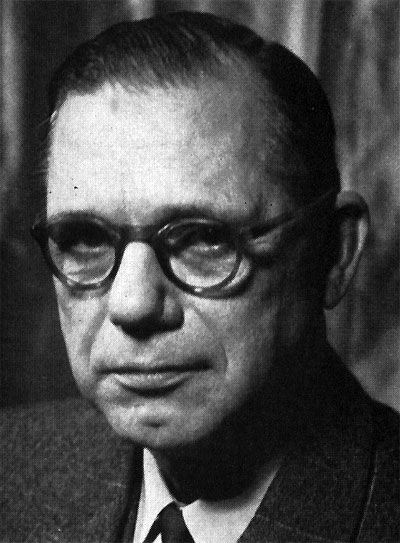
	First party	Second party	Third party
Leader	Per Albin Hansson	Gösta Bagge	Axel Pehrsson-Bramstorp
Party	Social Democrats	Right	Farmers' League
Last election	134	42	28
Seats won	115	39	35
Seat change	▼19	▼3	▲7
Popular vote	1,436,571	488,921	421,094
Percentage	46.55%	15.84%	13.64%
	Fourth party	Fifth party
Leader	Gustaf Andersson	Sven Linderot
Party	People's Party	Communist
Last election	23	3
Seats won	26	15
Seat change	▲3	▲12
Popular vote	398,293	318,466
Percentage	12.91%	10.32%
- Largest bloc and seats won by constituency
PM before election
Per Albin Hansson
Social Democrats
Elected PM
Per Albin Hansson
Social Democrats

General elections were held in Sweden on 17 September 1944. The Swedish Social Democratic Party remained the largest party, winning 115 of the 230 seats in the Andra kammaren of the Riksdag. Due to World War II, the four main parties continued to form a wartime coalition, only excluding the Communist Party. Its status as the only opposition party (the competing communist, pro-German Socialist Party of Sweden having lost its seats in 1940) presaged a record result, taking 15 seats and over 10 % of the votes, a tally only surpassed once, in 1998. The Social Democrats lost their absolute majority in the second chamber, but this did no difference as the broad coalition government went on until the peace the following year.

== Results ==
Party	Votes	%	Seats	+/–
Swedish Social Democratic Party	1,436,571	46.55	115	–19
National Organization of the Right	488,921	15.84	39	–3
Farmers' League	421,094	13.64	35	+7
People's Party	398,293	12.91	26	+3
Communist Party	318,466	10.32	15	+12
Radical National Association	6,775	0.22	0	New
Socialist Party	5,279	0.17	0	0
Swedish Socialist Unity	4,204	0.14	0	New
National League	3,819	0.12	0	New
Left Socialist Party	1,677	0.05	0	0
Other parties	1,205	0.04	0	0
Total	3,086,304	100.00	230	0
Valid votes	3,086,304	99.59		
Invalid/blank votes	12,799	0.41		
Total votes	3,099,103	100.00		
Registered voters/turnout	4,310,241	71.90		
Source: Nohlen & Stöver, SCB
