= Arvid Olsson =

Swedish politician and trade unionist

- Arvid Olsson in 1938

Member of the Swedish Parliament for Stockholm Municipality
- In office 1934–1940

Personal details
- Died: 1958 Stockholm
- Party: Social Democrat (–1917), Left Socialist/Communist (1917–1929), Socialist (1929–1940s)
- Profession: Gunsmith, editor

Ernst Arvid Olsson (1888–1958) was a Swedish politician and trade unionist. He was one of the foremost leaders of the Socialist Party.

== Youth ==
Olsson hailed from a statare family. He became a gunsmith for the Swedish Navy and a labour activist, living in Ramundeboda outside Laxå. A delegate at the 1914 congress of the Social Democratic Youth League, Olsson was thereafter one of the first Swedish communists to undergo political training in Soviet Russia.

== Communist labour leader ==
Olsson served as party secretary of the Communist Party. He also presided over the Trade Union Committee of the party and was the trade union affairs editor of Folkets Dagblad Politiken. However, after the sixth Congress of the Communist International the party suffered a factional conflict. Olsson belonged to the same grouping in the Central Committee as Karl Kilbom and Nils Flyg.

In August 1929, Olsson and Kilbom visited Moscow and were given the opportunity to express self-criticism. In October 1929 the split was final, as Kilbom, Olsson, Flyg and their followers were expelled from the party by the Executive Committee of the Communist International (through its representative Kullervo Manner). The expellees regrouped as a separate Communist Party of Sweden, later renamed Socialist Party. Olsson became the spokesperson on trade union affairs of the new party.

== In parliament ==
Olsson became a member of Parliament in 1934, replacing Edoff Andersson (who had died). He was elected to parliament in 1936. In the socialist parliamentary group, Olsson was Flyg's sole supporter in the controversy over the debate on the Spanish Civil War (Flyg was accused by others in the party of adopting a too ambivalent line towards the defense of the Spanish Republic). In 1937, Olsson and communist parliamentarian Knut Senander presented a joint motion to repeal the 1899 Åkarp Law, that was perceived as anti-labour. The motion was passed in both chambers of parliament in 1938. Olsson was one of the two parliamentarians that remained in the Socialist Party until the 1940 election (the other was Flyg).

== Editor ==
When Folkets Dagblad Politiken reappeared in 1942, Olsson was again named editor of trade union affairs of the newspaper. When Flyg died in 1943, Olsson was named as the new chief editor of the newspaper.

== Political legacy ==
Olsson was one of the architects of the process of shifting the Socialist Party towards nationalist positions. He employed Marxist terminology to justify these positions. Olsson argued that in circumstances such as the war between Finland and the Soviet Union the party ought to support the right of self-determination of smaller nations.

== Later life ==
After the Second World War, Olsson retreated from political life. He worked at the Public Employment Service office in Södermalm for a few years.
