= Arbetarkommun =

Arbetarkommun alt. Arbetarekommun (Labour Union) is the municipal unit of the Swedish Social Democratic Party. A labour union consists of several base level party units, workplace units, etc.

Historically the term had been used also by other socialist parties in Sweden. The Communist Party (SKP and later VPK), had a municipal units called communist labour unions (kommunistiska arbetarkommuner, KAK). The break-away Communist Party of Sweden (SKP) and the revived SKP started by them has continued to call their local units KAKs.

The Socialist Party of Karl Kilbom and Nils Flyg had municipal units called socialist labour unions (socialistiska arbetarkommuner).
