= National League of Sweden =

National League of Sweden Sveriges nationella förbund
- Founded: 16 October 1915
- Dissolved: 1996
- Ideology: 1915–1932: Conservatism (Swedish); 1932–1940: Swedish nationalism Authoritarian conservatism National conservatism Corporate statism 1940–1996: Nazism
- Political position: 1915–1932: Right-wing; 1932–1996: Far-right
- Mother party: General Electoral League (until 1934)

The National Youth League of Sweden (Swedish: Sveriges nationella ungdomsförbund [ˈsvæ̌rjɛs natɧʊˈnɛ̌lːa ˈɵ̂ŋdʊmsfœrˌbɵnd]; SNU) was the first youth organisation of the General Electoral League of Sweden. It was dislodged from its mother party in 1934 due to its pro-Nazi stance. It was then reconstructed as a separate political party, the National League of Sweden. After the Second World War, the political fortunes of the group dwindled.

== As the right-wing youth league ==
SNU was founded on 16 October 1915, at Hotell Kronprinsen in Stockholm. The organisation, though never formally recognized, became the youth referent of the General Electoral Union.

During the late 1920s SNU became politically radicalized. The radicalization was accentuated by the election of Elmo Lindholm as the SNU chairman. In 1931 the organization had 35,460 members, and was steadily growing. Eventually SNU organised a militant kamporganisation (struggle organisation, modelled after the German SA) which were supposed to combat political enemies in the streets. The kamporganisation had grey shirts, blue ties and blue armbands. The League supported the German Nazis after Adolf Hitler came to power in 1933.

Arvid Lindman, the leader of the party, clearly stated that Nazis were not accepted within his party.

Another issue of contention was whether there should have been any age limit for SNU membership. The General Electoral Union pushed for 35 years as an upper limit for SNU members, as well as a formal understanding that the role of SNU was to recruit young people for the General Electoral Union. SNU however refuted the idea of an age limit, as the organization wished to exert more political influence of its own.

Due to this, Arvid Lindman declared that the National Youth League no longer was considered the youth organisation of the Swedish right in 1934. While a new right-wing youth league emerged – what later became the Moderate Youth League – the National Youth League eventually re-organised as a political party named the National Youth League and League of Sweden (Sveriges Nationella Ungdomsförbundet och Förbund, SNUoF).

== As a political party ==
In the General Electoral Union-SNU split, three conservative MPs sided with SNUoF. These were Alf Meyerhöffer, Gösta Jacobsson and John Gustafsson. These three parliamentarians formed their own independent faction within parliament, dubbed Nationella Gruppen (the "National Faction"). None of them would see re-election in 1936 (see below).

In 1934, the small pro-German National Labour League (Nationella Arbetsförbundet) merged into SNUoF.

The group contested the 1935 municipal elections, gaining 70 seats throughout the country. The same year the name was changed to National League of Sweden (Sveriges Nationella Förbund). Antisemitism became a more prominent feature of the party. At this time its membership was around 40,000.

The party contested the 1936 general elections. With a mere 31,015 votes, the SNL did not win any seat in the parliament. The following year, on 10 October 1937, the National League New Sweden of Per Engdahl merged into SNF. Engdahl was allotted the position of vice-chairman of SNF.

At its national conference in 1938 SNF officially adopted a party programme, describing themselves as Corporative, New Swedish, Radical, Nationalist and Socialist. In the same year the Swedish Front of Bengt-Olov Ljungberg was attached to the party. Under Ljungberg's direction, the youth wing National Youth was built up in 1939.

In 1941, Engdahl broke away from SNF. Along with him left many prominent party members, like Ljungberg, and a major section of the youth wing. Engdahl and his followers formed Swedish Opposition. The same year SNF began to receive financial support from the Nazi Germany to publish the newspaper Dagsposten from Stockholm.

== Electoral results ==
=== Riksdag ===
Election year	# of overall votes	% of overall vote	# of overall seats won	+/-	Notes
1936	26,740	0.92 (#7)	0 / 349	▲	
1944	3,819	0.12 (#8)	0 / 349	▼	

== Disintegration in the Post-war era ==
After the war, SNF was severely isolated. In the 1946 municipal election it could only win 3 municipal seats in Helsingborg, but the same year the entire Helsingborg unit merged into the Right-wing Party. The main activity of SNF was the publishing of Dagsposten, which in 1952 got substituted with Fria Ord. When Christian Democratic Rally (KDS) emerged as a new political party in the 1960s, SNF tried to infiltrate it.

In 1980, SNF and the New Swedish Movement of Engdahl merged. The unity did not last, and in 1982 the two organizations parted ways. SNF has suffered from internal disputes and splits, and at least three separate SNFs have been in existence. One of the current existing groups claiming the name is attached to the NSDAP/AO of Gary Lauck.
