= Folkets Dagblad Politiken =

Swedish newspaper

- Folkets Dagblad Politiken, 15 March 1934 issue
- Type: Daily
- Editor: Ture Nerman (1916–1917), Carl Lindhagen (1917–1918), Fredrik Ström (1917–1919), Zeth Höglund (1919–1924), Karl Kilbom (1924–1936), Nils Flyg (1936–1940, 1942–1943), Arvid Olsson (1943–1945)
- Founded: 1916
- Ceased publication: 1945
- Political alignment: Social Democratic (1916–1917), Left-Socialist/Communist (1917–1929), Socialist (1929–1945)
- Language: Swedish language
- Headquarters: Luntmakargatan 52, Stockholm 59°20′24.71″N 18°3′38.76″E
- Circulation: 30,000 (early 1930s)

Politiken, later named Folkets Dagblad - Politiken was a Swedish Communist newspaper that existed from April 1916 to August 1940.

== History and profile ==
Politiken was launched in 1916, first issue published on 27 April that year, by the left wing of the Swedish Social Democratic Party. The left-wing was expelled from the Party in the summer of 1917, and the Social Democratic Left, under the leadership of Zeth Höglund and Ture Nerman, became the Communist Party of Sweden, strongly supporting the Russia October Revolution and the Bolsheviks. Politiken also published many texts by international communist leaders.

Politiken was first published two, later three times a week, but became a daily paper in 1917 and reached its peak in circulation in the early 1930s with approx. 30.000 issues printed every weekday.

When the Swedish Communist Party split in 1929, Folkets Dagblad – Politiken was taken over by the Kilbom-Flyg faction and became the main organ of their Socialist Party.

Over the years, the policies of Politiken changed and in the hands of Nils Flyg, Folkets Dagblad – Politiken slowly turned into a pro-German paper and by the end gave full political support for the German side in World War II. The last issue was published on 30 August 1940. It was published again from 1942 to 1945.

Editors were:

- Ture Nerman (1916–1917)
- Carl Lindhagen (1917–1918)
- Fredrik Ström (1917–1919)
- Zeth Höglund (1919–1924)
- Karl Kilbom (1924–1936)
- Nils Flyg (1936–1940, 1942–1943)
- Arvid Olsson (1943–1945)

The Swedish poet and novelist Ingeborg Björklund also worked for the publication in the years before Flyg took over.

== See also ==
- List of newspapers in Sweden
