= 1936 Swedish general election =

- 20 September 1936

All 230 seats in the Andra kammaren of the Riksdag 116 seats needed for a majority
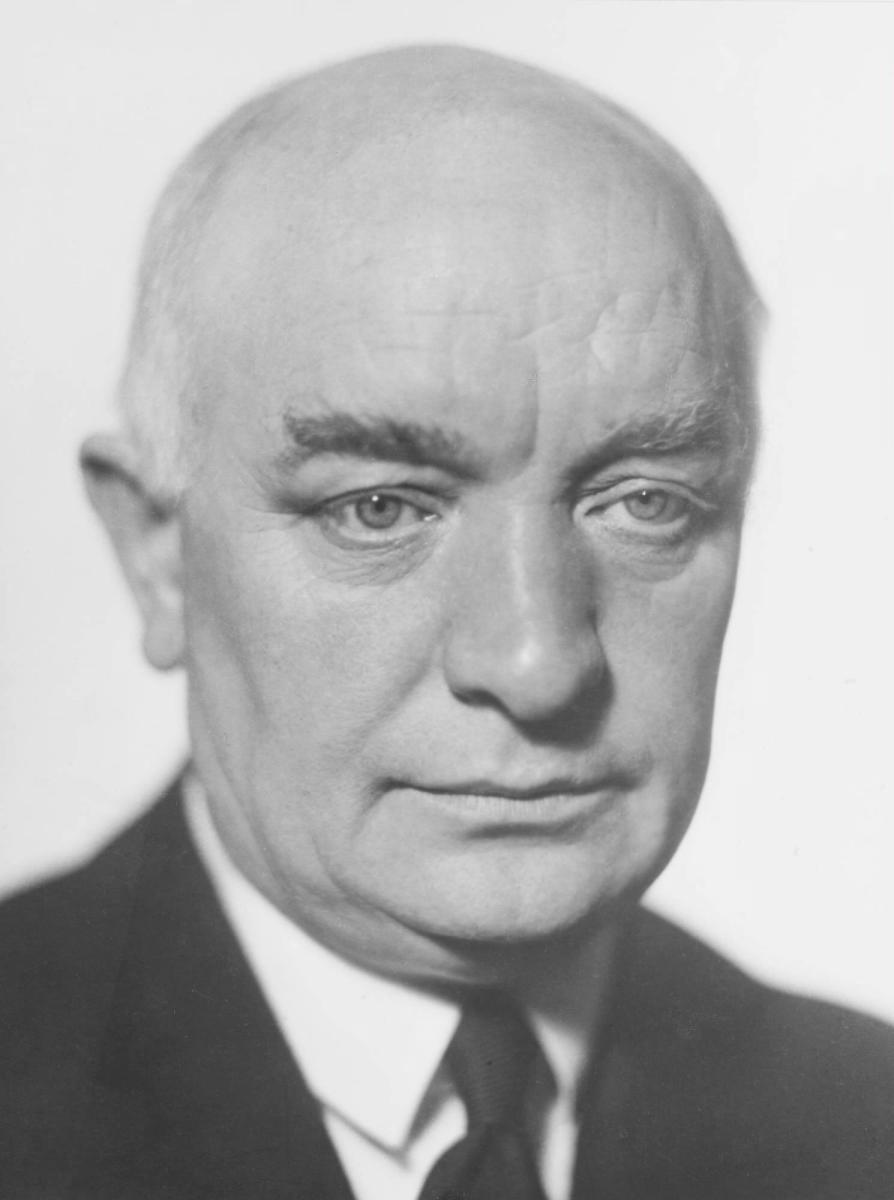

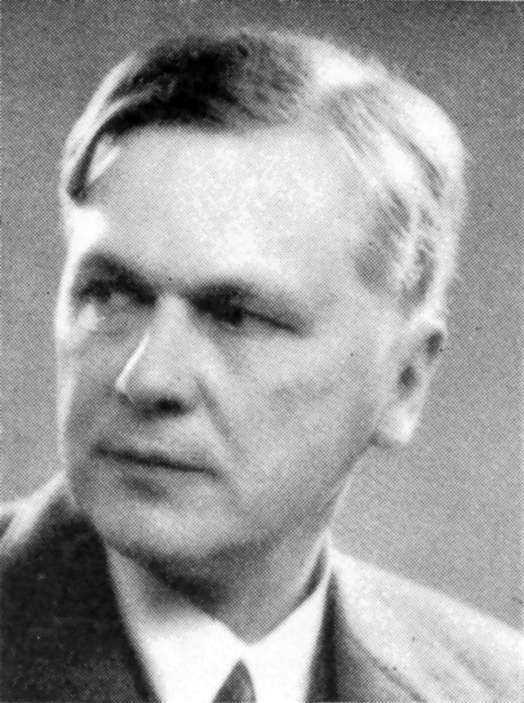

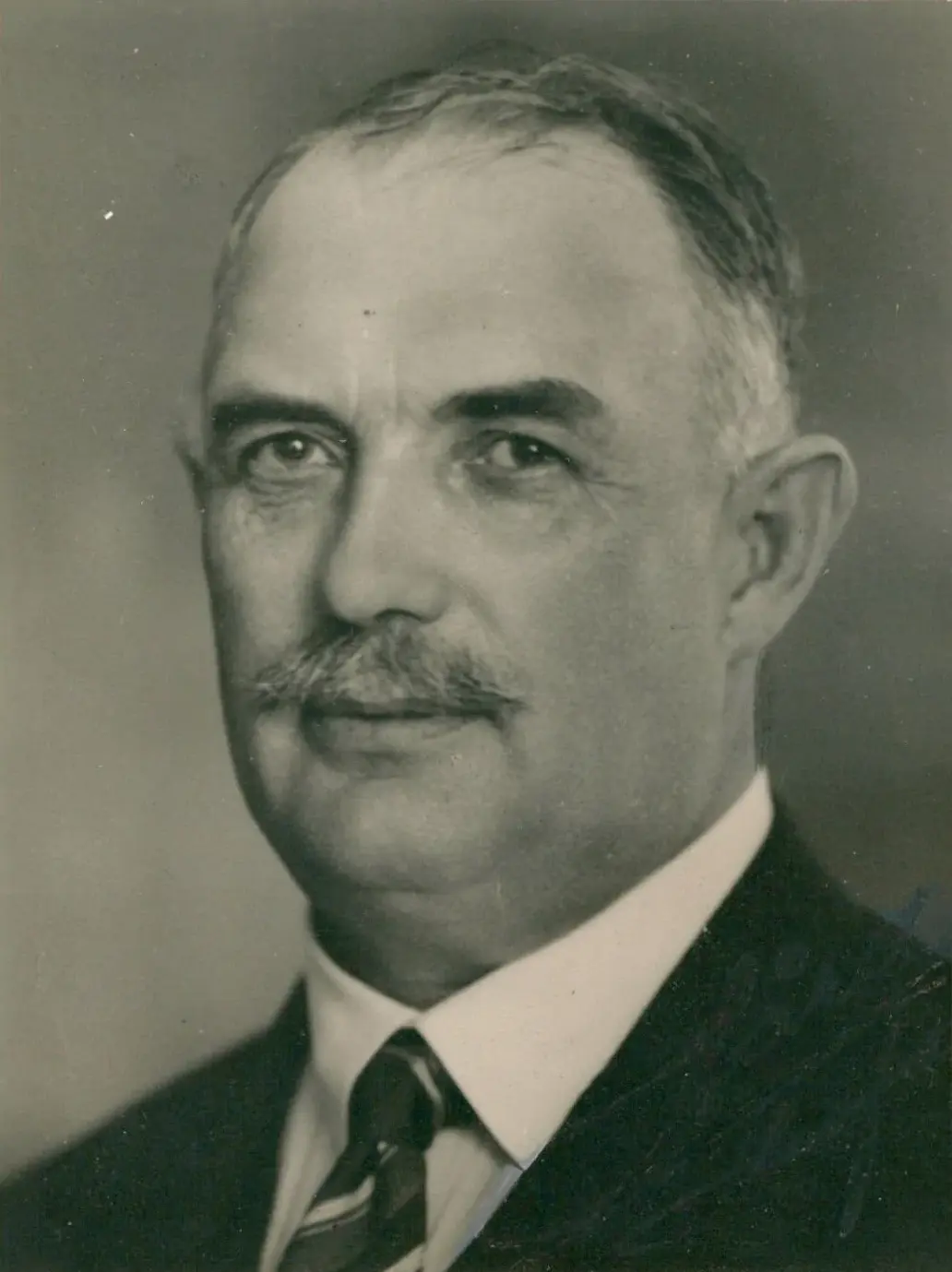

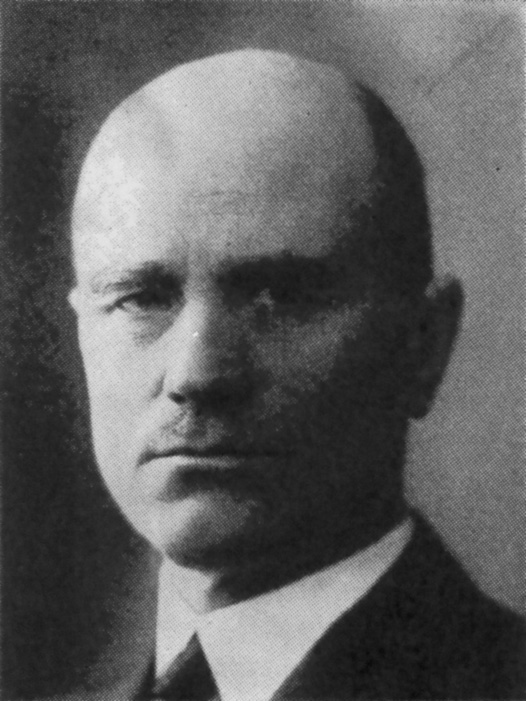

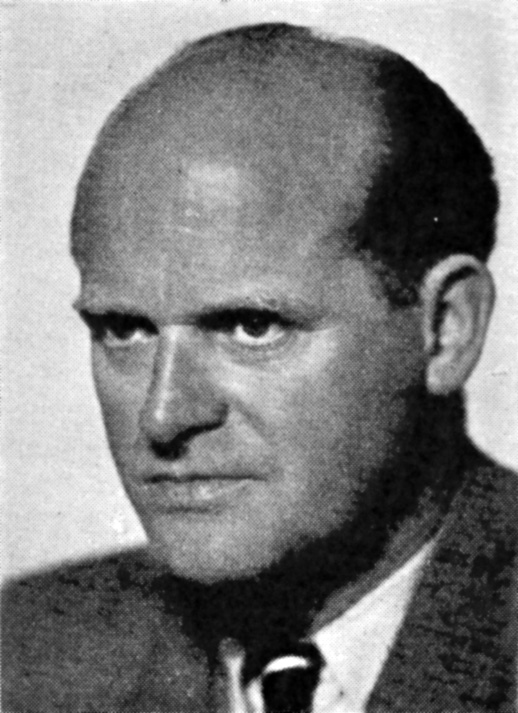

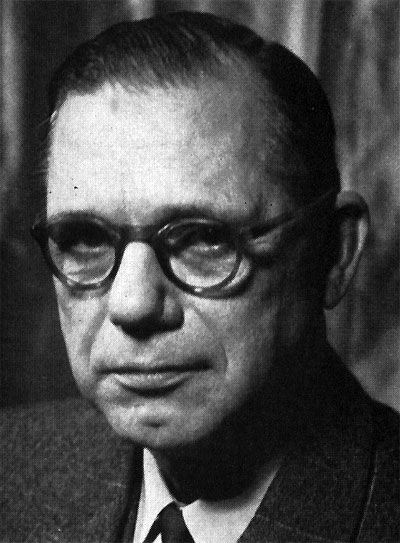
	First party	Second party	Third party
Leader	Per Albin Hansson	Gösta Bagge	Axel Pehrsson-Bramstorp
Party	Social Democrats	Electoral League	Farmers' League
Last election	104	58	36
Seats won	112	44	36
Seat change	▲8	▼14	Steady
Popular vote	1,338,120	512,781	418,840
Percentage	45.86%	17.57%	14.35%
	Fourth party	Fifth party	Sixth party
Leader	Gustaf Andersson	Nils Flyg	Sven Linderot
Party	People's Party	Socialist	Communist
Last election	24	6	2
Seats won	27	6	5
Seat change	▲3	Steady	▲3
Popular vote	376,161	127,832	96,519
Percentage	12.89%	4.38%	3.31%
- Most voted-for bloc and seats won by constituency
PM before election
Axel Pehrsson-Bramstorp
Centre
Elected PM
Per Albin Hansson
Social Democrats

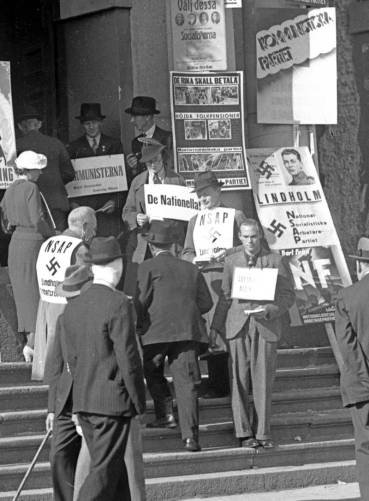
Party activists for the NSAP handing out ballot papers for their parties outside a polling booth

General elections were held in Sweden on 20 September 1936. The Swedish Social Democratic Party remained the largest party, winning 112 of the 230 seats in the Andra kammaren of the Riksdag.

== Results ==
Party	Votes	%	Seats	+/–
Swedish Social Democratic Party	1,338,120	45.86	112	+8
General Electoral League	512,781	17.57	44	–14
Farmers' League	418,840	14.35	36	0
People's Party	376,161	12.89	27	+3
Socialist Party	127,832	4.38	6	0
Communist Party	96,519	3.31	5	+3
National League	26,750	0.92	0	-3
National Socialist Workers' Party	17,483	0.60	0	New
Swedish National Socialist Party	3,025	0.10	0	0
Centre Party	96	0.00	0	0
Other parties	146	0.01	0	0
Total	2,917,753	100.00	230	0
Valid votes	2,917,753	99.73		
Invalid/blank votes	8,023	0.27		
Total votes	2,925,776	100.00		
Registered voters/turnout	3,924,598	74.55		
Source: Nohlen & Stöver, SCB
