= Trots allt! =

Weekly newspaper in Sweden (1939–1945)

- Type: Weekly newspaper
- Editor-in-chief: Ture Nerman; Kurt Singer
- Founded: Fall 1939
- Ceased publication: 1945
- Political alignment: Socialist; Anti-Nazi
- Language: Swedish
- Headquarters: Stockholm
- Country: Sweden

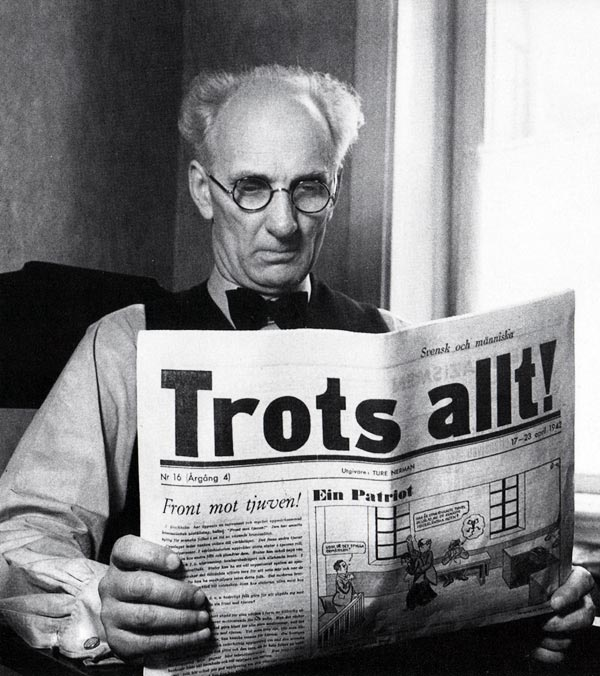
Nerman reading Trots allt!

Trots allt! (Swedish: Despite everything!) was a weekly socialist newspaper which existed between 1939 and 1945 in Stockholm, Sweden. The paper is known for its anti-Nazi stance and its founder and editor Ture Nerman. Due to its fierce criticism against Nazism the paper was subject to bans and censorship. Its title was a reference to the text by Karl Liebknecht entitled Trotz alledem!.

== History and profile ==
Trots allt! was launched by a group of Swedish liberals and socialists, including Ture Nerman, in Fall 1939. The editor of the paper was Ture Nerman. It came out weekly. An Austrian Jew Kurt Singer served as its coeditor. Polish lawyer Stanisław Adamek who had exiled to Sweden was one of the contributors.

The paper openly opposed the Nazi regime and the Swedish government's departure from the policy of neutrality and contained the materials for the Soviet propaganda. Between April 1940 and January 1941 the distribution of Trots allt! was halted by the government. In early 1942 the paper was also banned when it published a document, Black Book of the Government of Poland, by the Ministry of Information and Documentation of Poland. Its issues dated 10 November 1942 and 3 March 1943 were also confiscated by the state authorities. The paper folded in 1945.
