= Committee against the Finnish White Terror =

The Committee against the Finnish White Terror (Swedish: Kommittén mot den finska vita terrorn) was an organization in Sweden, formed at the end of the Finnish Civil War. The formation of the Committee was preceded by a call from the Social Democratic Left Party published in Politiken in February 1918 to mobilize protests around the country to counter the official Swedish government position on the Finnish question. The Committee sought to unite the Swedish labour movement for a common position against the White Terror in Finland. The Committee raised funds for humanitarian aid to the victims of the repression. The Committee also opposed denials of political asylum for Finnish refugees.

Sven Linderot was one of the three members of the Committee. The Committee managed to gather 21,851.53 kronor, 14,518.73 for Finnish refugees in Sweden and 6,920 kronor for affected in Finland. The Committee published 100,000 leaflets titled 'Truth about Finland', and more than 100 public meetings were organized.
