= Ingeborg Björklund =

Swedish poet and author (1897–1974)

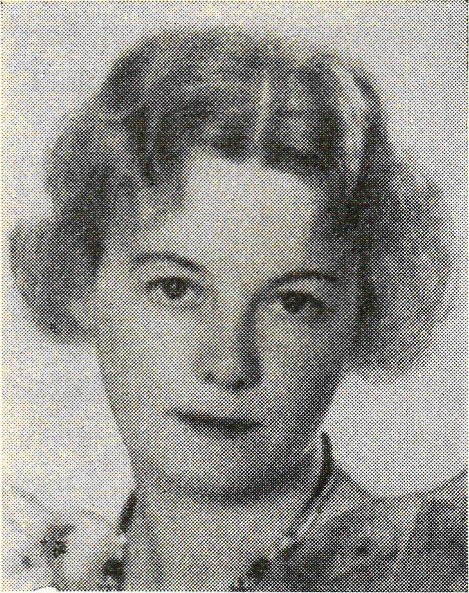
- Born: 18 September 1897; Gothenburg, Sweden
- Died: 2 April 1974 (aged 76); Stockholm, Sweden
- Occupations: writer, poet, editor
- Spouses: Ernst Samuelsson (1922–1926); Arnold Ljungdal (1926–1931); Eric Bexell (1935–1936)
- Children: 2

Ingeborg Fredrika Björklund (18 September 1897 – 2 April 1974) was a Swedish author.

She was born in 1897 to Wilhelm Björklund, a civil engineer, and Emma Häggberg Björklund. She studied at Lund University in 1919–20, and earned a teacher's degree in Gothenburg in 1924. In 1927 she went on study trips to Germany and the Soviet Union. Björklund's first novel, En kvinna på väg, was published in 1926. This was followed by Våren (1930), Månen över Lund (1931) and Han som sjöng (1935), a trilogy of novels centring on the issues faced by a single woman in a male-dominated world. Her first collection of poetry, Den spända strängen, was published in 1927, and dealt primarily with feminist and radical political issues. This was followed by the collections Ropet efter lycka (1928), Kärleksdikt (1932), Famn (1934) and Hemligt budskap (1938).

Björklund worked as an editor for the Saturday supplement of the Swedish communist newspaper Folkets Dagblad Politiken in the period 1928–32. She also was a colleague of the Swedish communist Albin Amelin on the magazine Mänsklighet in 1934.

Björklund was married three times, and had two children. Her first child, Bertil, who later went on to become a professor of medicine at Karolinska Institute, was born in 1921. She also had another son, Vilhelm Bexell, in 1936, who went on to become a journalist.
