= Dagsposten (Swedish newspaper) =

Daily fascist newspaper in Sweden (1941–1951)

- Type: Daily newspaper
- Founded: December 1941
- Ceased publication: 1951
- Political alignment: Far right
- Language: Swedish
- Headquarters: Stockholm
- Country: Sweden

Dagsposten (Swedish: The Daily Mail) was a Fascist daily newspaper which was published in Stockholm, Sweden, in the period of 1941 and 1951. Its subtitle was Tidning för nationell politik och kultur (Swedish: Newspaper for national politics and culture).

== History and profile ==
Dagsposten was established by the National League of Sweden in Stockholm in 1941. The group received financial support from Nazi Germany to launch the paper of which the first issue appeared in December 1941, and this support continued throughout World War II. Swedish teacher and historian Gustaf Jacobson also financed the establishment of the paper. Due to allegations about the financial support from Nazis the security police began an investigation and found the evidence of the support. Then a lawsuit was filed against the editor-in-chief of the paper, T. Telander, its foreign editor Rütger Essén and finance director Colonel H. Laurell, Berlin correspondent E. Gernandt and the chairman of the German Chamber of Commerce in Stockholm. The paper continued his support for the Nazis until 1951 when it folded.

Rütger Essén, a Swedish political scientist, was one of the editors-in-chief of Dagsposten.
