= Per Albin Hansson =

Swedish politician, Prime Minister of Sweden, 1932–36 and 1936–46

His Excellency Per Albin Hansson
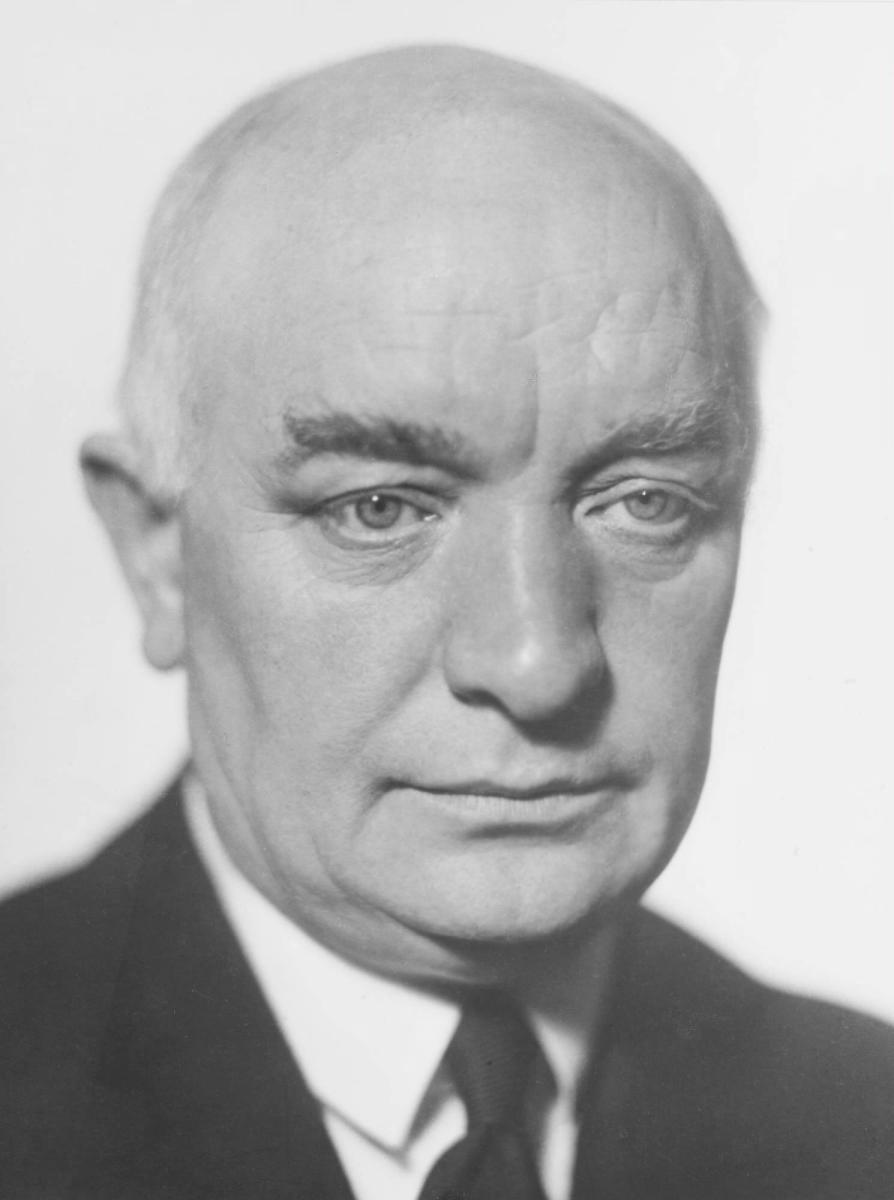
- Hansson in 1935

Prime Minister of Sweden
- In office 28 September 1936 – 6 October 1946
- Monarch: Gustaf V
- Preceded by: Axel Pehrsson-Bramstorp
- Succeeded by: Tage Erlander
- In office 24 September 1932 – 19 June 1936
- Monarch: Gustaf V
- Preceded by: Felix Hamrin
- Succeeded by: Axel Pehrsson-Bramstorp

Minister for Defence (Note: Minister for War between 10 March – 30 June 1920)
- In office 10 March 1920 – 27 October 1920
- Prime Minister: Hjalmar Branting
- Preceded by: Erik Nilsson
- Succeeded by: Carl Gustaf Hammarskjöld
- In office 13 October 1921 – 19 April 1923
- Prime Minister: Hjalmar Branting
- Preceded by: Otto Lybeck
- Succeeded by: Carl Malmroth
- In office 18 October 1924 – 7 June 1926
- Prime Minister: Hjalmar Branting; Rickard Sandler
- Preceded by: Carl Malmroth
- Succeeded by: Gustav Rosén

Personal details
- Born: Per Albin Hansson; 28 October 1885 Malmö, Sweden
- Died: 6 October 1946 (aged 60) Stockholm, Sweden
- Resting place: Norra begravningsplatsen
- Party: Social Democratic
- Spouse: Elisabeth Fryckberg (m. 1918; div. 1926)
- Domestic partner: Sigrid Vestdahl (1906–18, 1926–)
- Cabinet: Hansson I cabinet; Hansson II cabinet Hansson III cabinet Hansson IV cabinet
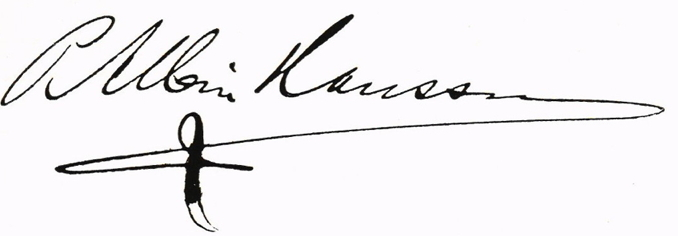
- Signature

Per Albin Hansson (28 October 1885 – 6 October 1946) was a Swedish statesman who served twice as Prime Minister of Sweden from 1932 until his death in 1946. He was leader of the Swedish Social Democratic Party (SAP) from 1925 and a member of the Riksdag’s lower house for Stockholm from 1918 to 1946. He introduced the concept of Folkhemmet (lit."the People’s Home") in 1928, a political vision that defined the Swedish welfare state. Known affectionately as a "father of the nation" (landsfader), Hansson led the country through the Great Depression of the 1930s and maintained its neutrality in the Second World War.

Built on ideas of social security, egalitarianism, and social inclusion, he promoted reforms aimed at improving living standards, expanding public services, and developing the social safety net. His governments oversaw major initiatives in housing, employment policy, defence planning, and social insurance, transforming the Social Democratic Party into Sweden’s dominant political force.

== Early life and career ==
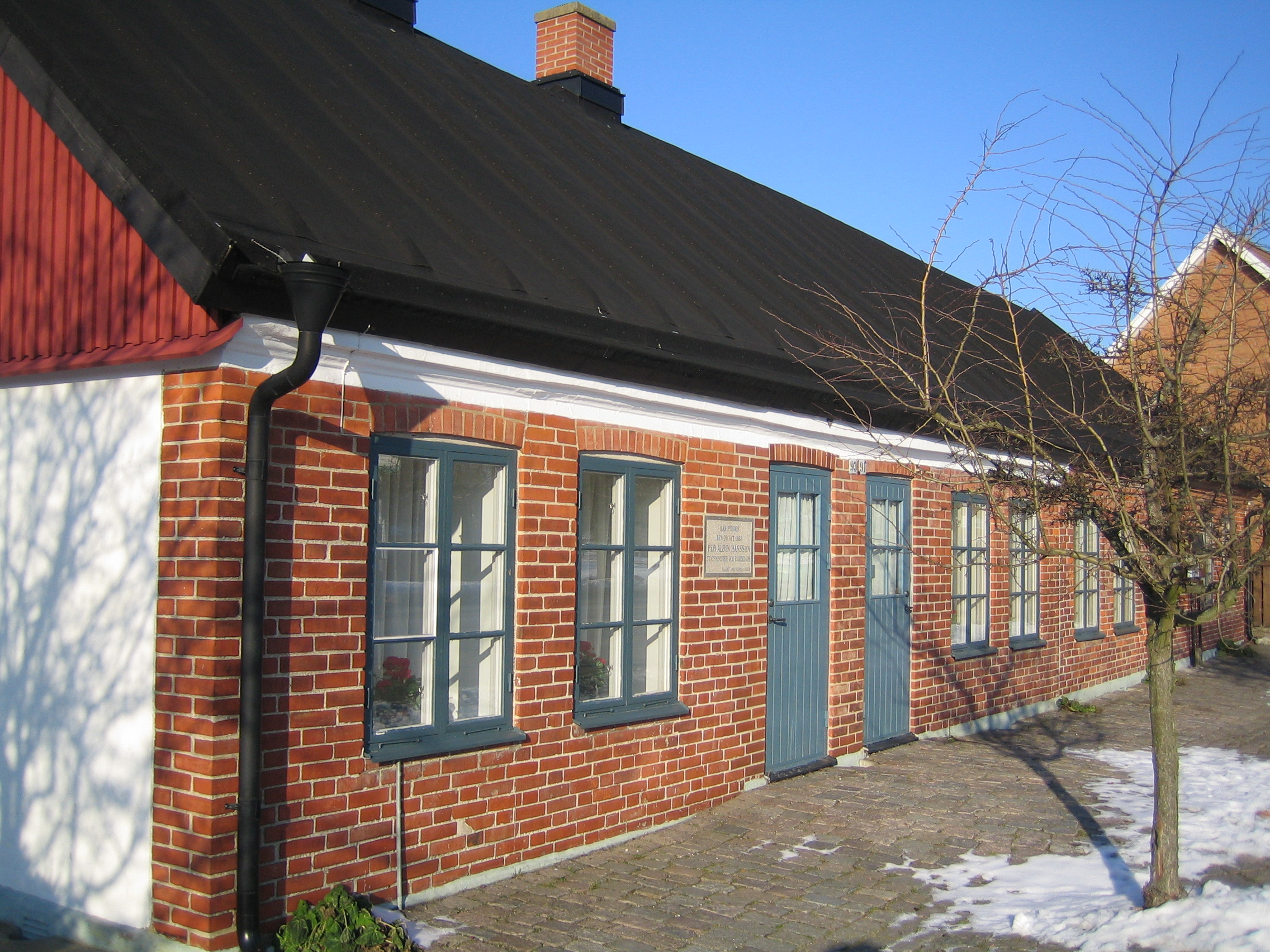
The birthplace of Per Albin Hansson

Per Albin Hansson was born on 28 October 1885 in Kulladal, a neighborhood in the Fosie district in Malmö, Sweden, the son of Carl Hansson, a bricklayer, and his wife Kersti Persdotter. He was the younger brother of the director general, newspaper publisher, and politician Sigfrid Hansson (1884–1939).

Hansson participated in establishing the Social Democratic Youth League (SDUF) in 1903 and presided over it as party chairman between 1908 and 1909, a period in which universal male suffrage and proportional representation was to be gradually enacted by conservative Prime Minister Arvid Lindman, later a rival of Hansson. Influenced generally by Karl Kautsky's views on socialism, Hansson succeeded Hjalmar Branting as editor-in-chief of Social-Demokraten ("the Social Democrat") in 1917, and was subsequently appointed as Minister for Defence in the country's first Social Democratic cabinet in 1920, following a Liberal-Social Democratic coalition enacting equal suffrage for both men and women (in effect as of the 1921 election). Hansson held this office in all of Branting's three cabinets between 1920 and 1925 (years which saw eight governments), performing numerous cut-backs on military expenditure. Upon Branting's death in 1925, Hansson became party chairman. However, his legitimacy as chairman remained under dispute, and was only fully embraced as chairman in 1927, when he became head of the Riksdag faction, and was later formally confirmed as Branting’s successor at a 1928 party congress.

After losing power to Carl Gustaf Ekman's Free-Minded National Association in 1926, Hansson worked from the opposition bench and, although heading what was to remain the largest party of the Riksdag to date, faced a major setback after cooperating with the Communist Party in the infamous election of 1928. Not until the 2010 election would the Social Democrats and the Communists (the latter changed name in 1995 to the Left Party) would the two parties run in tandem again.

In opposition to the second Lindman cabinet, despite being equally as pragmatic and staunchly anti-fascist, Hansson pressed for the introduction of a welfare state rather than wide-scale nationalizations. He called his vision Folkhemmet ("the People's Home") in a Riksdag debate on 18 January 1928.

The foundation of the home is togetherness and empathy. A good home knows no privileged or underprivileged, no favourites and no step-children. There no one looks down on another, no one tries to gain advantage at the expense of others, the strong do not oppress or plunder the weak. In a good home there is equality, kindness, cooperation, helpfulness.

In August 1932, with only a few months leading up to the 1932 election, prime minister Ekman resigned over a recently-surfaced corruption scandal involving the recently deceased industrialist Ivar Kreuger. The Social Democrats made gains, which altogether gave them 104 Riksdag seats and 41.7% of the popular vote. Though this left them short of a majority, the party benefited from the inability of the liberal parties (themselves unable to form a single faction until 1934), the conservatives, and the agrarians to form a stable administration of their own. This inability gave Hansson his chance; he courted and eventually obtained support from the Farmers' League through promising an agriculture policy favoring the interests of the League (kohandeln), although he stopped short of giving League parliamentarians any cabinet posts.

In June 1936, combined efforts of the liberals, the conservatives and the agrarians brought the Hansson-led government to an end and ensured Hansson's own resignation as prime minister on 19 June. Following Hansson's departure, League chairman Axel Pehrsson-Bramstorp was able to form the three-month "Vacation Cabinet", only lasting up until the elections in September, which saw a rise in support of the Social Democrats. This time around, Hansson invited certain League members into his cabinet, and Pehrsson-Brahmstorp became minister of agriculture. The administration enjoyed a substantial parliamentary majority that lasted until its resignation three years later in 1939.

== Political activity ==
During World War II, in which Sweden maintained a policy of neutrality, he presided over a government of national unity that included all major parties in the Riksdag with the exception of the Communist Party. Forging the Social Democratic grip on Swedish politics that would last throughout the century, Hansson left an astounding legacy on his party as well as creating the idea of Sweden to become "Folkhemmet", "The People's Home". This remained intact until the early 1990s, including a strict policy of neutrality, a wide-stretching welfare state through parliamentary legislation, and reformist social corporatism rather than Marxist socialization of the means of production. Following the war, Hansson formed a Social Democratic cabinet enjoying absolute majority in the Riksdag before succumbing to a heart attack on his way home from work late at night on 6 October 1946.

During Hansson's fourteen years as Prime Minister of Sweden, a wide range of reforms were realised, such as income-tested child allowances for invalidity pensioners and widows, maternity allowances through voluntary sickness insurance, and a 1935 law that introduced state subsidies for the construction of apartment houses for families with three or more children, combined with housing allowances for families with more than two children living in these houses. Subsidised dental care was also established. By 1953, dental clinics were open to the whole population, with children receiving free treatment and adults either paying a modest fee or (in the case of less well-off persons) free treatment as well.

A bill that provided for "the establishment of a voluntary unemployment insurance scheme was passed into law and came into force on 1 January 1935." The Government also allocated funds for the improvement of rural housing. An act of 26 June 1936 amended that of 1929 "so as to include all the diseases contained in the revised Convention, as well as those due to carbon monoxide, cyanogen and its compounds, chlorine, nitrous fumes, chromic acid and its compounds, and certain infectious diseases (hospital staffs, etc.)." A People's Travel Association was founded for workers and their families in March 1937. An act of 11 September 1936 "contains a new regulation of the right of association and collective bargaining. The act applies not only to workers in private undertakings but also to employees in the service of the State or the communes who have not the status of officials." On 1 November 1936 an act came into force "regulating hours of work on farms employing more than four workers, exclusive of cattle tenders. The maximum working day is 10 hours, and the net working week may vary from 46 to 56 hours in the course of the year." According to one study, the years 1937 to 1939 became "a harvest season for a series of social reforms that previously for the most part were dreams for the future."

Writing on these years, Hansson stated that "1937 loosened things up. That is when a pension amendment indexed to the cost of living was enacted, child support, mothers' assistance, maternity assistance, far-reaching improvements in preventative mother and child care, the housing loan fund. The regulation of farm labor was approved. 1938 gave us compulsory holidays, the national dental plan, and the Institute for Health Insurance. 1939 saw the regulation of working hours … [and] housing for pensioners was created for the aged."

An act to provide for 12 days of annual holiday with pay for workers passed the Riksdag on 2 June 1938, while a Royal Notification of 2 December 1938 "deals with medical inspection of workers exposed to silicosis, referring to: examination on engagement and annually thereafter; practical methods to be followed; medical authorities entrusted with examination; recording of results on the health register, etc." The Workers' Protection Act of 1912 was "amended and extended to cover certain aspects of hygiene and protection for young persons even in the smaller undertakings, as well as medical examination for adults on engagement and periodically thereafter in the case of particularly unhealthy trades, notably those involving exposure to lead poisoning and to silicosis." Also, under legislation of ("act of 3 June 1938, notification of 17 June 1938") "compensation has been extended to cover forms of dermatitis due to the use of chlorinated derivatives of phenol for impregnating wood." A 1938 act amended the Workers' Protection Act, with an Institute of Social Hygiene set up; one of its duties being the study of maternity protection. An act of 1938 authorised "loans and grants for the erection of roomy accommodation for large families living in overcrowded buildings in rural districts." The 48-hour week "has been extended to cover the staff in lunatic asylums and the Government has fixed the increases in staff which this reform involves." The Holidays with Pay act, which was promulgated on 17 June 1938, "contains special provisions for home workers." This act "introduced a legal system of annual holidays with pay in the country. The act, which is of general application, grants one working day's holiday for every month of service after one year, provided that at least 180 days have been worked in the same undertaking and at least 16 days per month; the act may not be used to invalidate any more favourable conditions contained in collective agreements. For seamen in particular the payment during the holiday includes wages and an allowance for food. Changes in the ownership of the vessel and interruptions of service for which the seaman is not responsible do not affect the right to the holiday."

A new act fixed hours of work for employees in commerce. From 1 January 1939 the working hours for nursing and domestic staff were 48 in the week, and on 10 March 1939 "the Government presented a Bill to amend the act of 16 May 1930 on hours of work in bakeries. The proposed amendments would enable Sweden to ratify the international Convention on the subject. They suppressed the exemption of family undertakings from the scope of the act and the provisions under which the act applied only to the production of bread and pastry for sale. The Bill was passed by Parliament on 11 May 1939." Instructions concerning the inspectorates for electrical installations, explosives and ships were published on 30 June 1939 and other instructions on the inspection of lifts on 13 December 1939. Three Royal Notifications of 26 January 1940 "amended the existing regulations on the special inspection of the State railways, private railways and explosive substances." The war risks of seamen in the event of accidents were dealt with in an act of 11 June 1937, which provided "for a very considerable increase in the accident benefits normally due to seamen if the injury or death results from an act of war. In the event of total incapacity or death the individual is entitled to a lump sum which, in the case of officers, is generally equal to twelve months' salary, and in the case of all other ratings, 4,800 kr. For partial incapacity the sum is proportionately reduced." An act of 14 October 1939 provided that "no person may be discharged from employment on account of military or other service which he is required by law to perform. The parties may however agree to override this rule if the military service is to last more than three months." An act of 19 May 1939 prohibited employers "from discharging, owing to engagement or marriage, any wage earner with at least two years' continuous service in the undertaking. Any agreement to the contrary is null and void and an employer who contravenes this rule must pay damages. The act applies to undertakings employing at least three persons."

== World War II ==
Following the German-Soviet invasion of Poland in 1939, Hansson declared strict neutrality and called for the formation of a broad coalition government involving all major parties under his leadership, which was realized in December except only the pro-Stalin Communist Party and its short-lived pro-German splinter faction, the Socialist Party. Alone in Europe save for Spain, Portugal, Switzerland, Ireland and the Vatican, Sweden maintained neutrality throughout all World War II, but like the mentioned countries, cooperated and traded with both sides. Winston Churchill claimed that Sweden during World War II ignored the greater moral issues and played both sides for profit, a criticism mimicked in criticism towards Sweden's policy towards the German occupation of Denmark and Norway upheld partly by transportation reinforcement through Swedish territory, sanctioned by Hansson's cabinet.

The German invasion of the Soviet Union on 22 June 1941, Operation Barbarossa sparked an ultimatum known as the Midsommarkrisen by the government of Nazi Germany to Hansson's cabinet, demanding some military concessions, including German troop transports on Swedish railways in order to support Germany's ally Finland. Political deliberations surrounding this ultimatum have been dubbed the "midsummer crisis", which ultimately, allegedly following King Gustav V's decision to resign should the concessions not be made, fell out in favor of the Axis. The 83-year-old king formally (although having not directly intervened in the government's policies since 1914) had the powers to appoint his own cabinet, and his open intervention in the issue was seen as a threat to the stability of the government and, given the ongoing war, to the sovereignty of the nation.

Recent research by Carl-Gustaf Scott argues however that there never was a "crisis" and that "the crisis was created in historical hindsight in order to protect the political legacy of the Social Democratic Party and its leader Per Albin Hansson."

To get the steel required by the German Ruhr and Upper Silesian industry, Germany was, in 1939–1940, dependent on shipments of Swedish iron ore, since access to the supplies from the mines in France, the traditional supplier, were cut off until the invasion of France. In 1939–1940 the Allies tried various ways to stop the shipments of Swedish ore, for example by mining Norwegian territorial waters.

In effect, the main political priority was to avoid direct war engagement of Sweden during World War II. Following Germany's setbacks around 1942–43, Sweden was no longer seriously threatened by an invasion from Nazi Germany and subsequently rolled back most of its concessions.

== Political legacy ==
Following the surrender of Germany, Hansson wanted to maintain a Social Democratic-led coalition government of all non-Communist parties. However, he failed to achieve this as a result of strong opposition within his own party which favoured a radical reformist agenda following the war. Hansson reluctantly agreed to a single-party government. He had abandoned his early revolutionary and strictly anti-militarist views in favor of social corporatism, class collaboration and a reformist agenda involving few nationalizations but stable armed forces in order to secure neutrality.

In January 1946, Hansson's government controversially agreed to extradite soldiers from the Baltic states that had been conscripted into the German armed forces and sought refuge in Sweden to the USSR, despite widespread protests and opposition from the Swedish public and the King. The government of Sweden formally apologized for this in 2011.

== Personal life ==
Per Albin Hansson lived with Sigrid Vestdahl (1886–1973) from 1906 to 1918 and again from 1926. She was the daughter of the machine worker Anders Peter Vestdahl and Sofia Friberg.

He was married from 18 November 1918 to 17 March 1926 in Mary Magdalene Parish, Stockholm, to Anna Elisabeth (Lisa) Fryckberg (born 27 February 1889 in Jacob Parish, Stockholm; died 16 July 1969 in Katarina Parish, Stockholm), who had previously been married to the journalist Einar Norlén. They had two children: Elsa Brita Marcussen (1919–2006) and Karin Oscarsson (1921-2016).

He fathered two children with Sigrid Vestdahl; Anna Lisa Berkling (1908–1987) and Per Gunnar Vestdahl (1914–1924). He continued his relationship with Vestdahl after his marriage to Fryckberg. He lived with and supported both families financially. This was most likely known to the press, but little was written about it. It appears both women were aware of the situation.

== Death ==
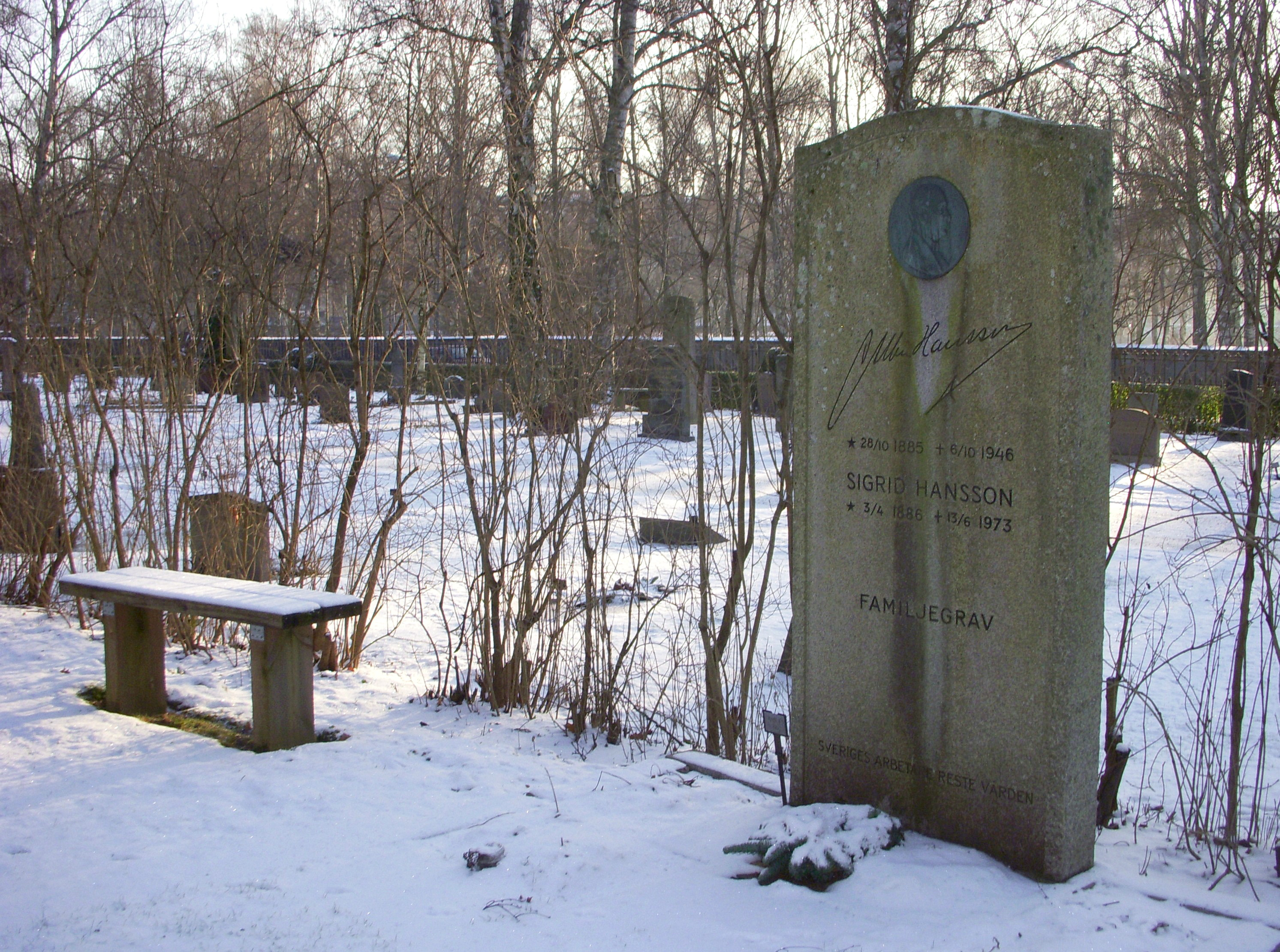
Gravestone at Norra begravningsplatsen

On Saturday, 5 October 1946, four representatives of the Norwegian Social Democratic government, led by Prime Minister Einar Gerhardsen, visited their Swedish counterparts in Stockholm. The discussions, which primarily concerned the reconstruction of Norway after the war, were interrupted at 6:00 p.m. when the Swedish cabinet members were to travel to Drottningholm Palace for an extraordinary council meeting with King Gustaf V. After the council, the government ministers returned to Stockholm for a dinner at Operakällaren with the Norwegian guests.

Finance Minister Ernst Wigforss rode in the same car as Hansson from Drottningholm. During the short journey, Hansson had complained of pain in his left arm, which he could barely lift. Despite the pain, Hansson was in good spirits during the dinner. After coffee, Hansson played bridge with his Norwegian guests in a smaller room at Operakällaren, called Kajutan.

Hansson left Operakällaren shortly after midnight and, as was his custom, took tram number 12 home to the townhouse in Ålsten. After getting off the tram at the Ålstensgatan stop, he collapsed to the ground, having suffered a heart attack. He is believed to have died immediately.

Hansson was interred on 13 October 1946 at Norra begravningsplatsen in Stockholm.

== In popular culture ==
In the Swedish television movie Four Days that shook Sweden – The Midsummer Crisis 1941 (1988), he is played by Swedish character actor Ernst-Hugo Järegård.

According to Daunfeldt, in Social democratic historiography, Hansson is portrayed as the father of modern Sweden.

He is depicted in the movie The Swedish Connection (2026), played by Per Lasson, during the events leading up to the rescue of the Danish Jews.

== Gallery ==
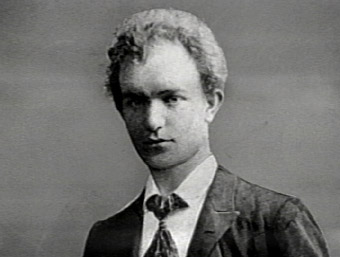
Per Albin Hansson in his youth

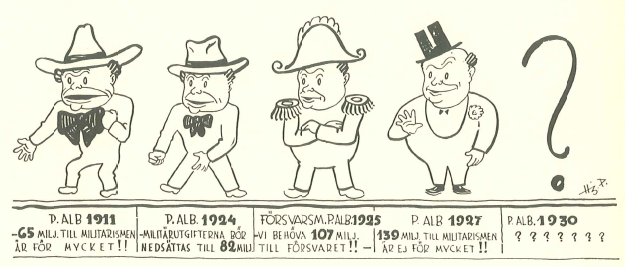
Communist caricature of Per Albin Hansson, portraying his transition from anti-militarist agitator to defense minister

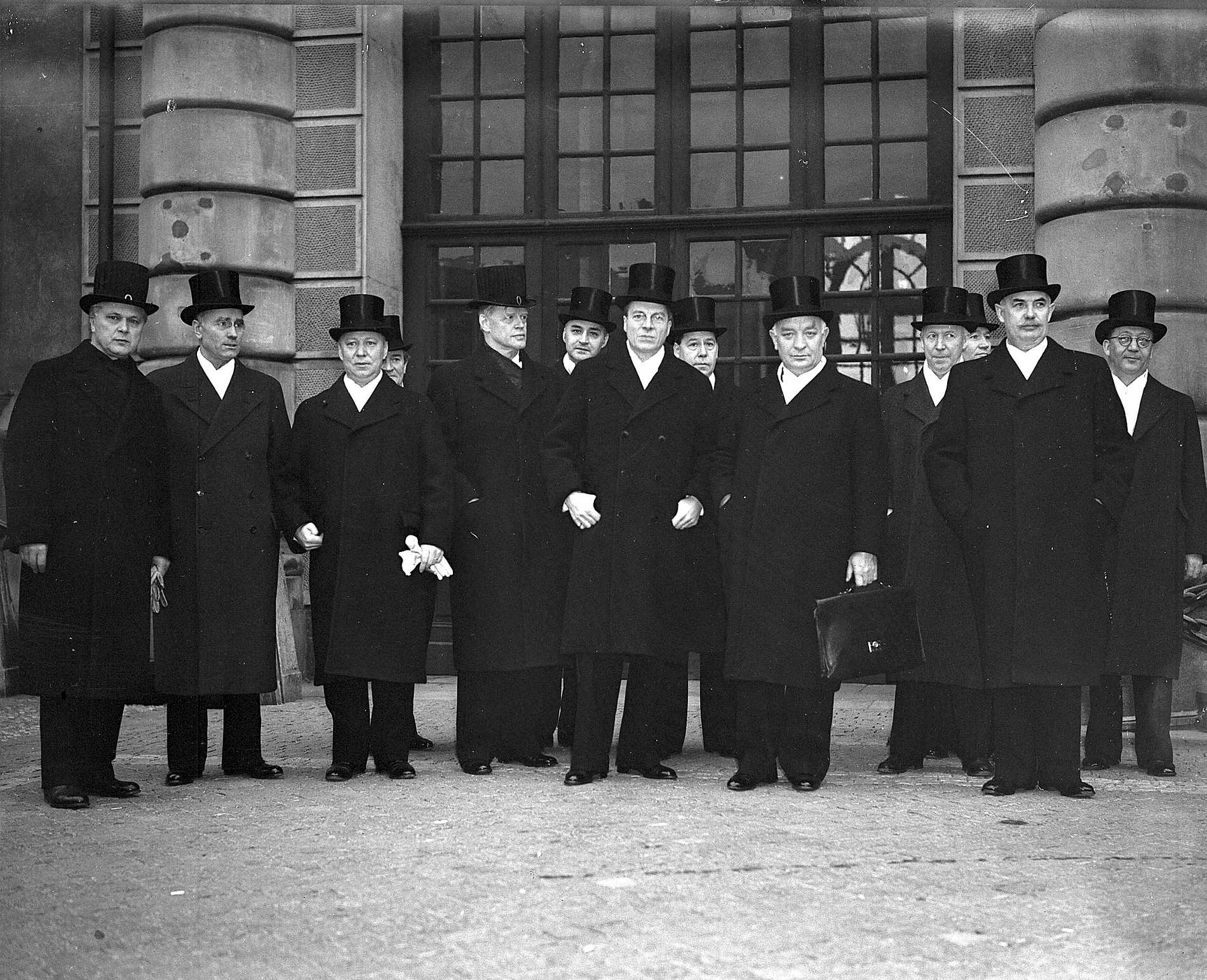
The newly appointed Swedish cabinet, assembled outside the Royal Palace in Stockholm, 13 December 1939

== See also ==
- Sweden during World War II
- Skåne Line

== Notes ==
Political offices
Preceded by Felix Hamrin	Prime Minister of Sweden; 1932–1936	Succeeded by Axel Pehrsson (Bramstorp)
Preceded by Axel Pehrsson (Bramstorp)	Prime Minister of Sweden; 1936–1946	Succeeded by Tage Erlander
Party political offices
Preceded by Hjalmar Branting	Chairman of the Swedish Social Democratic Party; 1925–1946	Succeeded by Tage Erlander
