= Conservatism in Sweden =

Political philosophy in Sweden

Conservatism in Sweden refers to the political philosophy of conservatism as it has developed in Sweden throughout the last two centuries. Today it is primarily represented by two major parties, namely the liberal-conservative Moderate Party and the nationalist Sweden Democrats.

== History ==
=== Early beginnings ===
In the early 19th century, Swedish conservatism developed alongside Swedish Romanticism. The historian Erik Gustaf Geijer, an exponent of Gothicism, glorified the Viking Age and the Swedish Empire, and the idealist philosopher Christopher Jacob Boström became the chief ideologue of the official state doctrine, which dominated Swedish politics for almost a century. Other influential Swedish conservative Romantics were Esaias Tegnér and Per Daniel Amadeus Atterbom.

=== Introduction of democracy ===
Early parliamentary conservatism in Sweden was explicitly elitist. The Conservative Party was formed in 1904 with one major goal in mind: to stop the advent of universal suffrage, which they feared would result in socialism. Yet, it was a Swedish admiral, the conservative politician Arvid Lindman, who first extended democracy by enacting male suffrage, despite the protests of more traditionalist voices, such as the later prime minister, the arch-conservative and authoritarian statesman Ernst Trygger, who railed at progressive policies such as the abolition of the death penalty.

Once a democratic system was in place, Swedish conservatives sought to combine traditional elitism with modern populism. Sweden's most renowned political scientist, the conservative politician Rudolf Kjellén, coined the terms geopolitics and biopolitics in relation to his organic theory of the state. He also developed the corporatist-nationalist concept of Folkhemmet ('the people's home'), which became the single most powerful political concept in Sweden throughout the 20th century, although it was adopted by the Social Democratic Party who gave it a more socialist interpretation.

=== World War II ===
During World War II, all parties from Left to Right, with the exception of the Communist Party, formed a grand coalition in the Hansson III cabinet. Around 3000 people, mostly communists, were deemed enemies of the state and sent to concentration camps during the war.

=== Post-war era ===
In the post-war era, the centre-right parties struggled to cooperate due to their ideological differences: the agrarian populism of the Centre Party, the urban liberalism of the Liberal People's Party, and the liberal-conservative elitism of the Moderate Party (the old Conservative Party). Furthermore, the Social Democrats became very popular at this time as a major centre-left party, but as it moved further to the left under Olof Palme it disenchanted many of its previous voters. In 1976 and in 1979, the three centre-right parties formed a government under Thorbjörn Fälldin—and again in 1991 under aristocrat Carl Bildt and with support from the newly founded Christian Democrats, the most conservative party in contemporary Sweden.

=== Contemporary politics ===
In modern times, mass immigration from distant cultures caused a large populist dissatisfaction, which was not channeled through any of the established parties, who generally espoused multiculturalism. Instead, the 2010s saw the rise of the right-wing populist Sweden Democrats, who were surging as the largest party in the polls on several occasions. Due to its fascist roots, the party was ostracised by the other parties until 2019 when Christian Democrat leader Ebba Busch reached out for collaboration, after which the Moderate Party followed suit. In 2022, the centre-right parties formed a government with support from the Sweden Democrats as the largest party. The subsequent Tidö Agreement, negotiated in Tidö Castle, incorporated authoritarian policies such as a stricter stance on immigration and a harsher stance on law and order.

The late 2010s also saw the emergence of new smaller conservative parties such as Alternative for Sweden and Citizens' Coalition. A new conservative think-tank, Oikos, was founded by Sweden Democrat Mattias Karlsson in 2020.

A resurgence of interest in conservatism has been particularly notable among the younger generation. In the 2022 school elections in Sweden, in which 80% percent of all Swedish teenagers participated, 9% voted for left-wing parties, 21% voted for centre-left parties, 8% voted for a centrist party, 41% voted for centre-right parties, and 21% voted for a right-wing party.
