= Socialist Party (Sweden, 1929) =

Socialist Party Socialistiska partiet
- Leader: Nils Flyg (1929–1943); Agaton Blom (1943)
- Founded: 1929
- Dissolved: 1948
- Split from: Communist Party of Sweden
- Newspaper: Folkets Dagblad Politiken; Tidens Röst (after 1940)
- Ideology: Socialism; Bukharinism (1929–1933); Anti-Stalinism; Pro-German sentiment (after 1940)
- Political position: Left-wing (Until 1940)
- International affiliation: International Communist Opposition (1929–1933), International Revolutionary Marxist Centre (1933–1938)

Party flag
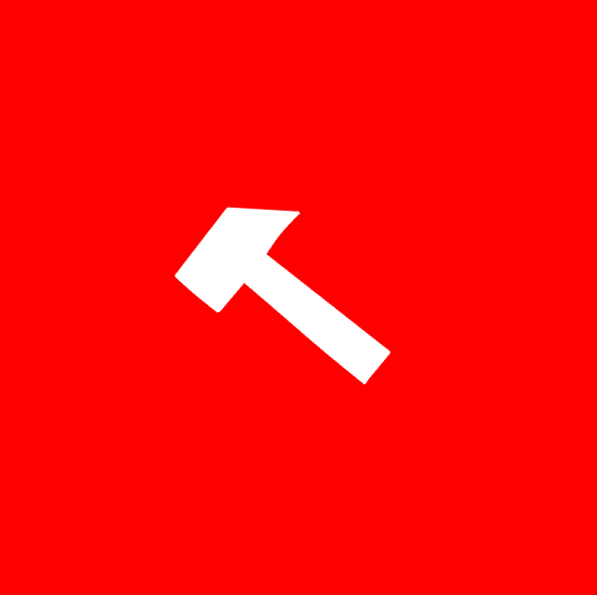
- Politics of Sweden; Political parties; Elections; A: Flyg believed that a victory for Stalinism would be the worst result of the German-Soviet War, and supported Germany out of opposition to Stalinism.

The Socialist Party (Swedish: Socialistiska partiet), was a political party in Sweden active from 1929 to 1948. Led by Karl Kilbom and Nils Flyg, the party was founded in 1929 as a splinter group of the Communist Party of Sweden. Until 1934, the splinter group used the same name as the old party, the Communist Party of Sweden (Swedish: Sveriges kommunistiska parti), so in order to keep the two factions apart, this faction was generally known as Kilbommare ("Kilbomiars") while those who stayed in the old party were known as Sillénare ("Sillénians", after their leader Hugo Sillén).

SP election poster. Text reads, "Strike the beast down - vote with the people for the country' (the dragon is labelled "International Big Finance").

In the split, the entire communist parliamentary group, the party's official newspaper, Folkets Dagblad Politiken, and most of the more militant members joined the Kilbom-Flyg faction.

In 1943, under Agaton Blom, they changed their name to the Swedish Socialist Party (Swedish: Svenska socialistiska partiet, SSP) and existed in this form until they dissolved in 1948.

== History ==
The Kilbom-led SKP held its congress prior to the Sillén-led party. At the congress there was a debate regarding the character of the party, whether to continue the system of party cells (the structure of the pre-split SKP) or whether to become a more open mass party. In the end the statutes adopted by the congress differed little from those of the pre-split SKP. Party cells remained the basic organization of the party, and in places where no cell existed a party member would be organized in the arbetarkommun directly. However the criteria for membership were relaxed, the sole remaining criterion was activism in the base level organization.

In 1930, Flyg, as an MP, put forward a motion on separation of church and state. The motion was voted down in the Lower House.

The Kilbom party merged in 1934 with a break-away group of the Social Democrats based in Gothenburg, led by Albin Ström. At the time of the merger, the party changed its name to the Socialist Party (Socialistiska partiet). The transformation into SP also marked a break with the previous line of the party towards the Comintern and the Soviet Union. Initially the party had tried to persuade the Comintern to be allowed to return to the International. Gradually, however the party became more and more antagonistic toward the Comintern and the Soviet Union.

The party gradually disintegrated, and many of the most prominent leaders such as Kilbom, left the party in 1937. During World War II, their staunch anti-Soviet line led the party to actually embrace some pro-German views (partially since the huge financial problems of the party led it to seek financial aid from Germany). As a result of this, in 1940, a group of members that included Albin Ström and Evald Höglund broke away and formed the Left Socialist Party. In the elections the same year, the party lost its parliamentary representation.

When Flyg died in 1943, he was succeeded as party leader by Agaton Blom. During the final years of the war, the party continued to lose members and support, and changed its name to the Swedish Socialist Party (Svenska socialistiska partiet), which was outspokenly supportive of Nazi ideology. The Swedish Socialist Party participated in the 1944 election and received 5,279 votes or 2 per thousand; they probably never reached a thousand members. The party was disbanded in 1948.

The local units of the party were known as "Socialist Labour Communes" (Socialistiska Arbetarkommuner).

In terms of international contacts, the party was initially associated with the International Communist Opposition and later with the International Revolutionary Marxist Centre (also known as the "London Bureau").

The youth league of the party was called the Socialist Youth League (Socialistiska ungdomsförbundet), affiliated to the International Bureau of Revolutionary Youth Organizations.

== Electoral results ==
1942 poster of the Uppsala party branch. Reads 'Blow up the Foundations of Reaction (the way out of war and isolation)'. Speakers were Nils Flyg and Arvid Olsson.

Electoral results of the party (in elections to the Riksdag):

Election year	# of overall votes	% of overall vote	# of overall seats won	+/−	Note
1932	132,564 ▲	5.3 (#5) ▲	6 / 230	6 ▲	New
1936	127,832 ▼	4.4 (#5) ▼	6 / 230	0	
1940	18,430 ▼	0.7 (#6) ▼	0 / 230	6 ▼	Extra-parliamentary
1944	5,279 ▼	0.2 (#6) ▼	0 / 230	0	Extra-parliamentary

== Publications ==
The party's newspaper was called Folkets Dagblad and had Arvid Olsson as editor. The party also published the weekly Sverige Fritt with Holger Möllman-Palmgren as editor and, among others, Annie Åkerhielm as writer.

== See also ==
- Left Socialist Party (Sweden), Vänstersocialistiska partiet, 1940–1963)
- Socialist Politics
