= Axel Pehrsson-Bramstorp =

Swedish politician (1883–1954)

His Excellency Axel Pehrsson-Bramstorp
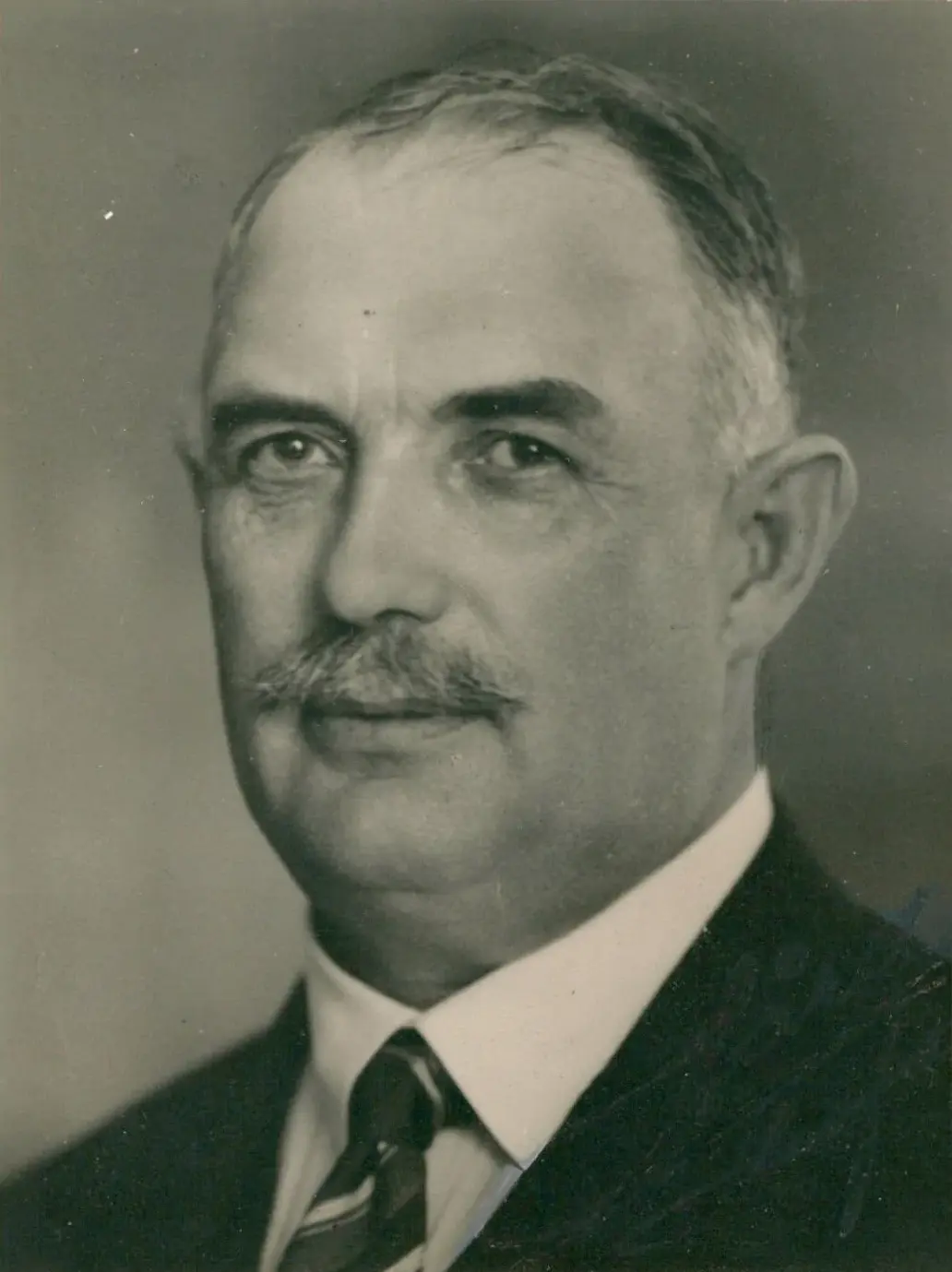

Prime Minister of Sweden
- In office 19 June 1936 – 28 September 1936
- Monarch: Gustaf V
- Preceded by: Per Albin Hansson
- Succeeded by: Per Albin Hansson

Minister of Agriculture
- In office 19 June 1936 – 31 July 1945
- Prime Minister: Himself (1936); Per Albin Hansson (1936–1945)
- Preceded by: Per Edvin Sköld
- Succeeded by: Per Edvin Sköld

Personal details
- Born: Axel Alarik Pehrsson; 19 August 1883 Ystad, Sweden
- Died: 19 February 1954 (aged 70) Trelleborg, Sweden
- Party: Farmers' League
- Spouse: Sigrid Nilsson (m. 1908; died 1951)
- Children: 4

Axel Alarik Pehrsson-Bramstorp (born Pehrsson; 19 August 1883 – 19 February 1954) was a Swedish politician and farmer who served as Prime Minister of Sweden from June to September 1936. Following his premiership, he served as Minister of Agriculture until 1945. Initially a member of the Liberal Coalition Party, Bramstorp served as leader of the Farmers’ League from 1934 and represented Malmö in the Riksdag from 1929 to 1949.

== Early life ==
Axel Pehrsson was a member of a farming family in Öja (now in Ystad Municipality) in Skåne. His father's death made it impossible for him to continue his schooling. After the age of 14, he later completed some adult education courses in a folkhögskola (the equivalent of community college). His parents' farm was of considerable size. At the time of his marriage he bought Bramstorp farm in the same parish and later took over the parental farm and bought several others as well.

== Political career ==
Pehrsson was active in local and regional politics, and in 1918 became a Member of the Second Chamber of the Riksdag, representing the Liberal Coalition Party, but he was not re-elected in 1921. He switched to the agrarian Farmers' League and was elected a Member of the Second Chamber in 1929, where he served until 1949. He was chairman of the party from 1934 to 1949.

After the first Social Democratic cabinet of Per Albin Hansson was overthrown by a parliamentary majority in spring 1936, Pehrsson got the mandate of King Gustaf V to form a non-socialist coalition government. This turned out to be impossible and Pehrsson briefly headed a one-party cabinet as prime minister from 19 June to 28 September 1936. Since this cabinet was only in office during the summer it was called "the vacation government". He appointed himself Minister of Agriculture; after the 1936 election to the Second Chamber in September he resigned as prime minister but remained as Minister of Agriculture in the new Hansson II cabinet, which was a coalition between the Social Democrats and the Farmers' League. He continued in the same cabinet position in the national unity Hansson III cabinet which was formed under Hansson's prime ministership at the outbreak of World War II in 1939 and sat until the end of the war in 1945.

== Later activities ==
After the resignation of the war-time coalition cabinet, Pehrsson-Bramstorp held various important positions in agricultural organisations, while remaining chairman of the Farmers' League and a member of parliament, until illness forced him to retire in 1949. He was awarded a knighthood of the Order of the Seraphim the same year, and lived the rest of his life on his farm.

Political offices
Preceded by Per Albin Hansson	Prime Minister of Sweden; 1936	Succeeded by Per Albin Hansson
Party political offices
Preceded by Olof Olsson	Chairman of the Centre Party of Sweden; 1934–1949	Succeeded by Gunnar Hedlund
