= Otto Grimlund =

Swedish politician (1893–1969)

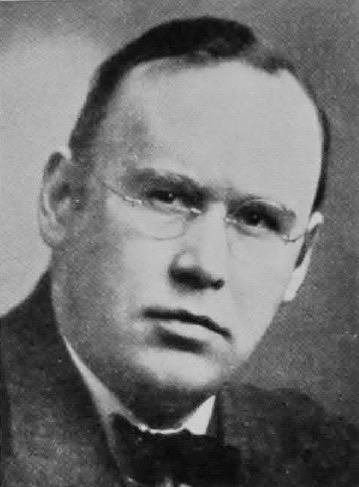

Otto Bernhard Grimlund (30 December 1893 – 15 September 1969) was a Swedish Communist politician.

Originally a member of the Swedish Social Democratic Party he joined the revolutionary left-wing in the party split of 1917 and represented the Swedish Social Democratic Left Party at the founding of the Communist International in Moscow in 1919.

Together with the Swiss Socialist Fritz Platten, Otto Grimlund had been the main organizer of Lenin’s 1917 trip from the exile in Switzerland, through Germany and Sweden, back to Russia.

Grimlund was in the leadership of the Swedish Communist Party from 1918 to 1925, and living in Moscow for many years, he was in the leadership of the Comintern. But he moved from the Soviet Union and left the party after the rise of Stalinism in Russia.

Grimlund rejoined the Social Democratic Party around 1930.

Condemning Stalinism, Grimlund called himself a Communist all his life, and kept a signed photograph of Lenin on the wall in his office. Grimlund was key to Lenin's arrival in Russia, arranging his travel through Sweden and onward to Russia after Lenin's sealed train journey from Germany.
