= Sven Linderot =

Swedish Communist leader

Sven Linderot K
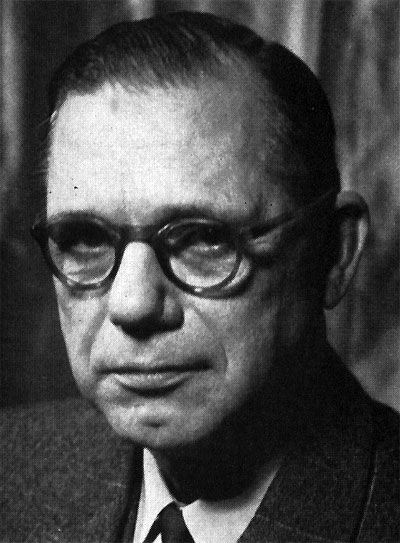
- Sven Linderot c. 1955

Chairman of the Communist Party of Sweden
- In office 1929–1951
- Preceded by: Nils Flyg
- Succeeded by: Hilding Hagberg

Member of the Riksdag's First Chamber for Stockholm County
- In office 1939–1949
- Constituency: Västerbotten County and Norrbotten County

Personal details
- Born: 8 October 1889 Skedevi parish, Finspång Municipality, Östergötland County, Sweden
- Died: 7 April 1956 (aged 66) Stockholm, Sweden
- Resting place: Skogskyrkogården
- Party: Social Democrats (1907-1917); Swedish Social Democratic Left Party (1917-1921); Communist Party (1921-1956)
- Spouse: Gerda Linderot
- Children: Ina Linnéa Linderot
- Profession: Journalist, politician

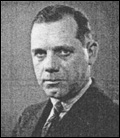
Sven Linderot c. 1935

Sven Harald Linderot (8 October 1889, in Skedevi, Finspång, Östergötland County – 7 April 1956) was a Swedish Communist party leader. He was born Sven Harald Larsson but changed his surname to Linderot in 1918. Among party members he was also known as Sven-Lasse.

Linderot became active in the Swedish Social Democratic Party in 1914 and he joined the left opposition at the party split in 1917, which soon became the Communist Party of Sweden. During the Finnish Civil War he was active in Committee against the Finnish White Terror. Linderot was one of the leaders of the party's youth organization and in late 1921 he was sent to Moscow to work for the Communist International (Comintern). He was also editor of the party newspaper Norrskensflamman from 1925 to 1927.

When the party split in 1929, Linderot emerged as one of the main figures in the pro-Comintern faction together with Hugo Sillén, which by orders of Moscow expelled a majority of the party's members, including the leadership. Linderot replaced the expelled Nils Flyg as leader of the party, a position he held from 1929 to 1951.

In 1939, Sven Linderot was elected to the upper house (Swedish: första kammaren) of the Parliament of Sweden, where he had a seat until 1949.

Party political offices
Preceded by Nils Flyg	Leader of the Communist Party of Sweden; 1929 – 1951	Succeeded by Hilding Hagberg
