= Nils Flyg =

Swedish politician (1891–1943)

Nils Flyg SP K
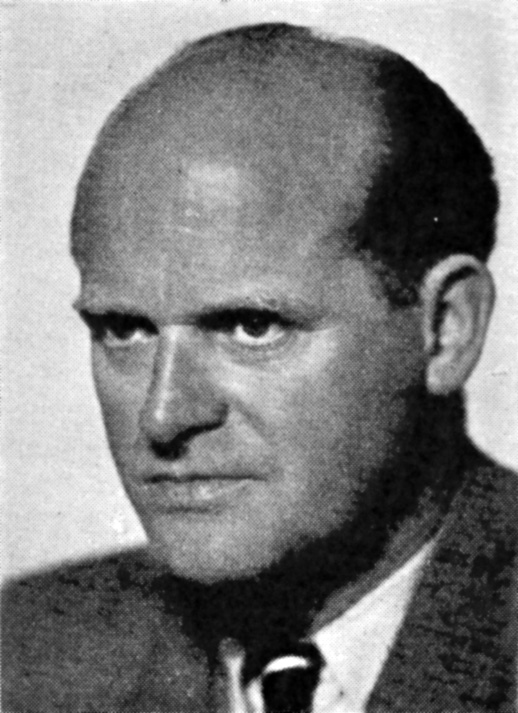
- Nils Flyg c. 1938

Leader of the Socialist Party
- In office 1929–1943
- Preceded by: Position created
- Succeeded by: Agaton Blom

Leader of the Communist Party
- In office 1924–1929 Serving with Karl Kilbom
- Preceded by: Zeth Höglund
- Succeeded by: Sven Linderot

Leader of the Communist Youth League
- In office 1921–1924
- Preceded by: Zeth Höglund
- Succeeded by: Unknown

Member of the Riksdag's Second Chamber for Stockholm County
- In office 1929–1940
- Constituency: Stockholm County

Personal details
- Born: 9 June 1891 Maria Magdalena parish, Stockholm Municipality, Stockholm County, Sweden
- Died: 9 January 1943 (aged 51) Nacka parish, Nacka Municipality, Stockholm County, Sweden
- Resting place: Nacka Church graveyard
- Party: Socialist Party (1929–1943)
- Other political affiliations: Communist Party (1921–1929); Social Democratic Party (before 1919)
- Profession: Book editor, politician

Nils Svante Flyg (9 June 1891 – 9 January 1943) was a Swedish Socialist Party politician who became a Nazi sympathizer during World War II.

Nils Flyg was born and raised in Södermalm, a working-class area of Stockholm at the time. Early on he joined the Swedish Social Democratic Party's youth organization, the Swedish Social Democratic Youth League. In 1917, Flyg took part in the founding of a new leftist party, a group headed by Zeth Höglund and Karl Kilbom, which would soon become the Communist Party of Sweden.

Flyg became an important leader of the Communist Party, wrote books and went on political trips to the Soviet Union. In the general election of 1928, with the Flyg-dominated Communists cooperating with the dominant Social Democratic Party, he failed to achieve an influential position as voters failed to show substantial support for a Communist-Social Democratic coalition. In 1929 Flyg, along with the majority of the party's membership, was accused of insufficient loyalty to the Soviet-dominated Comintern and expelled from the party. The same year Flyg and Kilbom founded a new, parallel Communist Party, which claimed to be the real Communist Party of Sweden.

Initially Flyg and Kilbom attempted to reconcile with the Comintern, something that soon proved fruitless. Flyg and Kilbom who supported Nikolai Bukharin and his Right Opposition, gradually developed an animosity towards Stalinism. By 1934 the party had changed name to the Socialist Party (Socialistiska partiet). At first, the Socialist Party still supported the Soviet Union but condemned the Stalinist leadership. But by the end of the 1930s, the party had changed its view and criticized the whole of the Soviet Union, a stance that gradually developed to a foreign policy embracing Nazi Germany.

In 1937 Kilbom was expelled from the party after a few years of disputes and personal struggle between the two leaders. After the expulsion of Kilbom a majority of the members of the party left. The Socialist Party shrank dramatically and Flyg became more and more politically isolated.

At the beginning of World War II, Flyg came out in opposition to fascism, and the Nazi-Soviet pact in his eyes proved that Stalinism was just as bad as fascism. But when Hitler broke the pact with Stalin, and Germany launched the invasion against the Soviet Union, Flyg decided that he had to support the Nazis against Stalin, hoping it would lead to the end of Stalinism. Financial constraints led him to approach the German High Commission in Stockholm. Initially, the Germans turned down his request for funding, but in the final stages of the war (when the Germans felt a more urgent need for allies in the Swedish politics) funding was granted. Gradually, Flyg and his party developed a pro-Nazi position.

Still, Nils Flyg never fully gave in to Hitlerism. He was neither an adherent of core fascist or racist policies, and considered himself a socialist until his death. He was against capitalism and imperialism and openly supported the basic ideas of Marx and Lenin.

Flyg died in 1943.

Party political offices
Preceded by Karl Kilbom	Leader of the Communist Party of Sweden; 1924 – 1929	Succeeded by Sven Linderot
Preceded by Zeth Höglund	Leader of the Communist Youth League; 1921 – 1924	Unknown
Preceded by Party created 1929	Leader of the Socialist Party; 1929–1943	Succeeded by Agaton Blom
