= Results of the 1924 Swedish general election =

Sweden held a general election around 19 September 1924. This was the second election under universal suffrage. In spite of a majority for the non-socialist parties, Social Democrat Hjalmar Branting was able to form a government, although the government eventually fell and was replaced by a right-leaning Electoral League government.

== Results ==
Party	Votes	%	Seats	+/–
Swedish Social Democratic Party	725,407	41.09	104	+11
General Electoral League	461,257	26.12	65	+3
Free-minded National Association	228,913	12.97	29	–12
Farmers' League	190,396	10.78	23	+2
Liberal Party	69,627	3.94	4	New
Communist Party	63,601	3.60	4	–3
Communist Party (Höglund Tendency)	26,301	1.49	1	New
Other parties	84	0.00	0	0
Total	1,765,586	100.00	230	0
Valid votes	1,765,586	99.69		
Invalid/blank votes	5,473	0.31		
Total votes	1,771,059	100.00		
Registered voters/turnout	3,338,892	53.04		
Source: Nohlen & Stöver

== Regional results ==
=== Percentage share ===
Location	Share	Votes	S	AV	F	B	LP	K	KP	Other	Left	Right
Götaland	51.0	900,777	38.3	30.9	10.7	13.2	4.1	2.0	0.9	0.0	41.1	58.9
Svealand	33.8	595,985	46.6	21.9	13.7	6.9	4.5	4.5	1.9	0.0	53.0	47.0
Norrland	15.2	268,824	38.4	19.3	19.0	11.3	2.3	7.1	2.6	0.0	48.1	51.9
Total	100.0	1,765,586	41.1	26.1	13.0	10.8	3.9	3.6	1.5	0.0	46.2	53.8
Source: SCB

=== By votes ===
Location	Share	Votes	S	AV	F	B	LP	K	KP	Other	Left	Right
Götaland	51.0	900,777	344,563	278,788	96,262	118,673	36,601	17,889	7,956	45	370,408	530,324
Svealand	33.8	595,985	277,649	130,539	81,565	41,352	26,844	26,621	11,393	22	315,663	280,300
Norrland	15.2	268,824	103,195	51,930	51,086	30,371	6,182	19,091	6,952	17	129,238	139,569
Total	100.0	1,765,586	725,407	461,257	228,913	190,396	69,627	63,601	26,301	84	815,309	950,193
Source: SCB

== Constituency results ==
The blocs have been listed with "left" as the socialist and communist parties, whereas the "right" were the non-socialist liberal and conservative parties, although bloc politics were not as clear as later in the century.

=== Percentage share ===
Location	Land	Share	Votes	S	AV	F	B	LP	K	KP	Other	Left	Right	Margin
Location		%		%	%	%	%	%	%	%	%	%	%	
Blekinge	G	2.3	40,611	42.2	33.2	12.7	7.7	3.2	0.7	0.3	0.0	43.2	56.8	5,488
Bohuslän	G	3.0	52,520	33.2	37.8	6.4	9.7	10.0	2.9	0.0	0.0	36.1	63.9	14,628
Gothenburg	G	4.1	72,675	50.7	28.8	3.5	0.0	11.0	5.9	0.0	0.0	56.6	43.4	9,605
Gotland	G	1.0	17,203	16.7	26.7	16.1	40.5	0.0	0.0	0.0	0.0	16.7	83.3	11,468
Gävleborg	N	4.2	74,943	52.4	10.1	13.1	12.7	2.7	7.2	2.0	0.0	61.6	38.4	17,342
Halland	G	2.7	47,998	27.8	35.7	4.1	22.0	7.6	1.8	1.0	0.0	30.6	69.4	18,616
Jämtland	N	2.1	36,863	28.7	18.0	25.7	15.9	2.8	4.5	4.4	0.0	37.6	62.4	9,170
Jönköping	G	4.0	71,344	24.4	32.0	22.6	16.6	0.0	1.8	2.6	0.0	28.9	71.1	30,126
Kalmar	G	3.4	59,589	26.9	36.4	7.4	19.5	4.5	4.6	0.7	0.0	32.2	67.8	21,255
Kopparberg	S	4.2	73,318	42.9	10.9	23.3	11.0	2.2	7.0	2.8	0.0	52.7	47.3	3,950
Kristianstad	G	3.9	68,241	38.0	24.5	23.4	12.4	0.0	1.0	0.6	0.0	39.6	60.4	14,180
Kronoberg	G	2.6	45,895	29.5	39.0	11.6	16.8	0.0	1.6	1.5	0.0	32.6	67.4	15,955
Malmö area	G	4.4	77,196	58.1	35.0	4.0	0.0	0.8	2.1	0.0	0.0	60.2	39.8	15,724
Malmöhus	G	5.5	96,739	53.2	15.1	2.5	21.3	7.6	0.3	0.0	0.0	53.5	46.5	6,729
Norrbotten	N	2.3	40,171	25.5	29.4	11.5	9.7	0.0	22.9	1.1	0.0	49.4	50.6	461
Skaraborg	G	3.8	67,659	26.3	35.5	20.1	14.8	1.6	0.8	0.8	0.0	27.9	72.1	29,874
Stockholm	S	9.2	162,358	48.7	34.0	4.4	0.0	7.1	4.2	1.5	0.0	54.5	45.5	14,608
Stockholm County	S	4.2	74,745	46.1	24.9	8.5	9.8	4.8	5.1	1.0	0.0	52.1	47.9	3,137
Södermanland	S	3.3	58,092	51.8	16.7	20.4	6.7	1.7	1.8	0.9	0.0	54.5	45.5	5,177
Uppsala	S	2.3	41,305	44.9	21.4	14.9	12.0	3.4	3.4	0.0	0.0	48.3	51.7	1,400
Värmland	S	4.3	76,399	43.2	16.7	18.6	9.2	2.8	7.1	2.4	0.0	52.7	47.3	4,143
Västerbotten	N	2.5	43,576	21.7	33.8	40.2	0.5	3.8	0.0	0.0	0.0	21.7	78.3	24,654
Västernorrland	N	4.1	73,271	45.9	15.3	13.2	14.9	2.0	4.0	4.6	0.0	54.5	45.5	6,612
Västmanland	S	2.8	49,096	48.9	15.5	13.8	12.3	3.9	2.1	3.6	0.0	54.5	45.5	4,444
Älvsborg N	G	2.7	47,942	37.0	28.5	16.3	12.5	2.4	0.7	2.5	0.0	40.3	59.7	9,332
Älvsborg S	G	2.3	39,829	24.5	48.8	10.0	13.3	1.2	0.7	1.6	0.0	26.7	73.3	18,535
Örebro	S	3.4	60,672	44.6	16.3	19.8	6.7	6.0	3.3	3.2	0.0	51.1	48.9	1,304
Östergötland	G	5.4	95,336	44.5	26.1	8.2	11.9	5.2	2.5	1.6	0.0	48.7	51.3	2,517
Total		100.0	1,765,586	41.1	26.1	13.0	10.8	3.9	3.6	1.5	0.0	46.2	53.8	134,884
Source: SCB

=== By votes ===
Location	Land	Share	Votes	S	AV	F	B	LP	K	KP	Other	Left	Right	Margin
Location		%												
Blekinge	G	2.3	40,611	17,150	13,478	5,139	3,118	1,314	287	124	1	17,561	23,049	5,488
Bohuslän	G	3.0	52,520	17,440	19,827	3,385	5,110	5,252	1,506			18,946	33,574	14,628
Gothenburg	G	4.1	72,675	36,831	20,956	2,549		8,030	4,309			41,140	31,535	9,605
Gotland	G	1.0	17,203	2,867	4,590	2,773	6,972				1	2,867	14,335	11,468
Gävleborg	N	4.2	74,943	39,298	7,532	9,788	9,481	1,999	5,367	1,477	1	46,142	28,800	17,342
Halland	G	2.7	47,998	13,348	17,126	1,972	10,577	3,632	868	475		14,691	33,307	18,616
Jämtland	N	2.1	36,863	10,563	6,641	9,485	5,849	1,039	1,641	1,640	5	13,844	23,014	9,170
Jönköping	G	4.0	71,344	17,438	22,824	16,094	11,809		1,295	1,868	16	20,601	50,727	30,126
Kalmar	G	3.4	59,589	16,018	21,718	4,382	11,620	2,701	2,713	435	2	19,166	40,421	21,255
Kopparberg	S	4.2	73,318	31,434	7,980	17,078	8,036	1,588	5,116	2,082	4	38,632	34,682	3,950
Kristianstad	G	3.9	68,241	25,928	16,749	15,994	8,466		679	422	3	27,029	41,209	14,180
Kronoberg	G	2.6	45,895	13,524	17,877	5,315	7,732		743	702	2	14,969	30,924	15,955
Malmö area	G	4.4	77,196	44,861	27,018	3,088		630	1,599			46,460	30,736	15,724
Malmöhus	G	5.5	96,739	51,440	14,625	2,411	20,576	7,391	283	9	4	51,732	45,003	6,729
Norrbotten	N	2.3	40,171	10,236	11,810	4,607	3,897		9,182	435	4	19,853	20,314	461
Skaraborg	G	3.8	67,659	17,796	24,044	13,587	10,024	1,106	545	546	11	18,887	48,761	29,874
Stockholm	S	9.2	162,358	79,103	55,137	7,166		11,568	6,887	2,489	8	88,479	73,871	14,608
Stockholm County	S	4.2	74,745	34,448	18,608	6,327	7,289	3,577	3,775	715	6	38,938	35,801	3,137
Södermanland	S	3.3	58,092	30,085	9,712	11,859	3,897	989	1,017	532	1	31,634	26,457	5,177
Uppsala	S	2.3	41,305	18,545	8,848	6,148	4,937	1,419	1,407		1	19,952	21,352	1,400
Värmland	S	4.3	76,399	33,003	12,776	14,176	7,066	2,109	5,414	1,853	2	40,270	36,127	4,143
Västerbotten	N	2.5	43,576	9,460	14,713	17,508	231	1,662			2	9,460	34,114	24,654
Västernorrland	N	4.1	73,271	33,638	11,234	9,698	10,913	1,482	2,901	3,400	5	39,939	33,327	6,612
Västmanland	S	2.8	49,096	23,989	7,586	6,771	6,044	1,925	1,011	1,770		26,770	22,326	4,444
Älvsborg N	G	2.7	47,942	17,754	13,658	7,815	6,010	1,153	357	1,193	2	19,304	28,636	9,332
Älvsborg S	G	2.3	39,829	9,750	19,453	3,976	5,281	472	274	623		10,647	29,182	18,535
Örebro	S	3.4	60,672	27,042	9,892	12,040	4,083	3,669	1,994	1,952		30,988	29,684	1,304
Östergötland	G	5.4	95,336	42,418	24,845	7,782	11,378	4,920	2,431	1,559	3	46,408	48,925	2,517
Total		100.0	1,765,586	725,407	461,257	228,913	190,396	69,627	63,601	26,301	84	815,309	950,193	134,884
Source: SCB

== Results by city and district ==
=== Blekinge ===
Location	Share	Votes	S	AV	F	B	LP	K	KP	Left	Right
Bräkne	15.9	6,469	44.1	25.9	7.3	20.1	1.2	1.3	0.0	45.5	54.5
Karlshamn	5.8	2,374	40.4	43.9	10.2	0.2	4.1	1.0	0.3	41.6	58.4
Karlskrona	18.7	7,612	44.6	39.5	8.7	0.1	7.0	0.1	0.0	44.7	55.3
Lister	18.1	7,354	35.4	37.6	17.3	8.1	0.7	0.7	0.2	36.3	63.7
Medelstad	20.8	8,463	47.3	29.2	11.8	8.3	1.6	0.8	1.0	49.1	50.9
Ronneby	3.0	1,210	36.0	44.8	13.3	0.0	5.0	0.8	0.0	36.9	63.1
Sölvesborg	3.2	1,319	40.8	29.9	18.8	0.8	7.3	2.2	0.8	43.8	56.2
Östra	13.4	5,426	42.4	26.7	19.9	9.3	1.4	0.3	0.1	42.8	57.2
Postal vote	0.9	384									
Total	2.3	40,611	42.2	33.2	12.7	7.7	3.2	0.7	0.3	43.2	56.8
Source: SCB

=== Gothenburg and Bohuslän ===
==== Bohuslän ====
Location	Share	Votes	S	AV	F	B	LP	K	Left	Right
Askim	7.6	4,013	37.9	27.4	7.3	16.0	6.8	4.7	42.5	57.5
Bullaren	0.9	448	1.3	50.2	1.3	6.3	40.4	0.4	1.8	98.2
Inlands Fräkne	2.4	1,253	11.7	48.0	3.0	16.4	20.9	0.0	11.7	88.3
Inlands Nordre	5.7	2,970	12.3	53.2	3.4	17.4	13.8	0.0	12.3	87.7
Inlands Södre	3.7	1,964	11.9	53.5	0.9	28.8	4.9	0.0	11.9	88.1
Inlands Torpe	2.6	1,358	58.5	16.7	1.7	15.2	7.8	0.0	58.5	41.5
Kungälv	1.3	694	39.8	53.0	3.3	1.0	2.9	0.0	39.8	60.2
Kville	2.4	1,238	31.1	40.1	1.5	9.0	17.9	0.5	31.6	68.4
Lane	3.7	1,939	17.9	48.4	1.4	10.7	21.6	0.0	17.9	82.1
Lysekil	3.0	1,577	42.5	45.4	6.2	0.0	3.7	2.2	44.6	55.4
Marstrand	0.7	385	32.5	42.3	12.2	0.0	13.0	0.0	32.5	67.5
Mölndal	8.6	4,494	63.0	13.6	4.9	3.3	3.8	11.3	74.4	25.6
Orust Västra	4.8	2,537	6.2	70.8	5.4	4.3	13.1	0.1	6.3	93.7
Orust Östra	2.2	1,134	11.0	53.5	3.2	6.5	25.7	0.0	11.0	89.0
Sotenäs	6.0	3,176	42.1	25.8	15.1	0.0	10.1	6.9	49.0	51.0
Strömstad	1.2	654	19.6	47.6	24.8	0.0	4.4	3.7	23.2	76.8
Stångenäs	5.7	2,970	49.1	41.0	0.7	2.2	6.8	0.2	49.3	50.7
Sävedal	5.4	2,837	41.9	22.6	4.8	16.4	3.3	11.0	52.9	47.1
Sörbygden	2.5	1,320	0.4	90.2	0.0	3.9	5.6	0.0	0.4	99.6
Tanum	3.1	1,613	17.3	50.7	11.2	11.8	8.8	0.2	17.5	82.5
Tjörn	2.5	1,323	10.9	31.6	23.8	14.6	19.1	0.0	10.9	89.1
Tunge	4.3	2,267	43.0	30.5	0.6	9.2	16.7	0.0	43.0	57.0
Uddevalla	9.3	4,910	49.9	30.8	4.6	0.3	14.0	0.5	50.4	49.6
Vette	3.8	1,971	46.1	25.7	9.4	6.6	6.2	5.9	52.1	47.9
Västra Hising	6.1	3,222	17.3	36.5	18.0	24.7	1.8	1.7	19.0	81.0
Östra Hising	0.4	234	10.3	15.4	1.3	71.8	1.3	0.0	10.3	89.7
Postal vote	0.0	19								
Total	3.0	52,520	33.2	37.8	6.4	9.7	10.0	2.9	36.1	63.9
Source: SCB

==== Gothenburg ====
Location	Share	Votes	S	AV	F	LP	K	Left	Right
Gothenburg	100.0	72,675	50.7	28.8	3.5	11.0	5.9	56.6	43.4
Total	4.1	72,675	50.7	28.8	3.5	11.0	5.9	56.6	43.4
Source: SCB

=== Gotland ===
Location	Share	Votes	S	AV	F	B	Left	Right
Gotland Norra	40.4	6,950	18.7	22.2	10.3	48.8	18.7	81.3
Gotland Södra	42.1	7,242	6.9	19.9	24.1	49.1	6.9	93.1
Visby	17.4	2,995	35.6	53.3	10.4	0.8	35.6	64.4
Postal vote	0.1	16						
Total	1.0	17,203	16.7	26.7	16.1	40.5	16.7	83.3
Source: SCB

=== Gävleborg ===
Location	Share	Votes	S	AV	F	B	LP	K	KP	Left	Right
Ala	10.7	8,031	64.3	2.8	7.0	15.2	1.6	8.0	1.1	73.4	26.6
Arbrå-Järvsö	4.7	3,527	37.1	7.3	23.0	20.5	3.3	8.8	0.0	45.9	54.1
Bergsjö-Forsa	9.5	7,148	38.7	6.9	16.9	26.5	1.8	9.1	0.1	47.9	52.1
Bollnäs ting	14.0	10,481	48.7	6.9	17.3	17.7	2.3	6.8	0.3	55.8	44.2
Delsbo	3.3	2,505	41.8	8.3	5.0	40.5	2.0	2.2	0.2	44.2	55.8
Enånger	2.7	1,987	41.4	6.5	11.7	22.0	3.2	15.2	0.0	56.7	43.3
Gästrikland Västra	10.5	7,888	49.1	7.3	13.0	12.4	4.3	10.1	3.8	63.0	37.0
Gästrikland Östra	15.0	11,271	58.4	6.2	14.1	5.8	2.4	10.0	3.0	71.4	28.6
Gävle	15.2	11,389	60.5	20.3	11.4	0.0	3.6	1.6	2.5	64.6	35.4
Hudiksvall	2.8	2,098	32.9	27.6	15.3	2.0	6.0	16.2	0.0	49.1	50.9
Ljusdal	6.5	4,836	54.8	12.2	10.0	13.5	2.0	1.6	5.8	62.2	37.8
Söderhamn	5.0	3,758	63.1	19.1	8.3	0.1	1.0	4.5	3.9	71.5	28.5
Postal vote	0.0	24									
Total	4.2	74,943	52.4	10.1	13.1	12.7	2.7	7.2	2.0	61.6	38.4
Source: SCB

=== Halland ===
Location	Share	Votes	S	AV	F	B	LP	K	KP	Left	Right
Falkenberg	3.8	1,809	36.8	39.2	7.0	1.2	9.8	5.5	0.6	42.8	57.2
Faurås	10.8	5,162	13.8	41.6	3.1	36.2	4.1	1.0	0.0	14.9	85.1
Fjäre	12.4	5,945	12.8	36.2	1.5	45.9	2.6	1.0	0.0	13.8	86.2
Halmstad	14.3	6,860	41.9	32.6	4.1	0.1	13.8	4.3	3.4	49.5	50.5
Halmstad Hundred	11.4	5,488	36.1	33.5	3.0	17.3	8.1	1.6	0.4	38.1	61.9
Himle	7.1	3,412	12.4	41.3	9.2	26.8	8.9	1.3	0.0	13.7	86.3
Hök	10.5	5,042	20.5	25.1	4.0	41.4	8.5	0.1	0.4	21.1	78.9
Kungsbacka	1.4	654	29.4	61.0	4.4	1.1	3.5	0.6	0.0	30.0	70.0
Laholm	1.7	817	32.7	39.0	1.8	11.3	14.6	0.1	0.5	33.3	66.7
Tönnersjö	10.1	4,827	51.1	24.4	5.0	5.7	8.5	2.2	3.1	56.4	43.6
Varberg	5.6	2,708	42.1	38.4	7.1	0.2	8.5	2.9	0.8	45.8	54.2
Viske	3.1	1,502	7.5	35.3	7.5	5.6	44.1	0.0	0.0	7.5	92.5
Årstad	7.8	3,759	19.0	50.4	1.1	25.7	2.7	1.0	0.2	20.1	79.9
Postal vote	0.0	13									
Total	2.7	47,998	27.8	35.7	4.1	22.0	7.6	1.8	1.0	30.6	69.4
Source: SCB

=== Jämtland ===
The two Communist Parties ran on a joint list, having their votes reported separately only at a final vote tally.

Location	Share	Votes	S	AV	F	B	LP	K	Left	Right
Berg	4.7	1,724	20.2	14.2	37.2	17.1	1.3	10.0	30.2	69.8
Hammerdal	10.9	4,013	24.5	21.6	18.7	23.2	2.1	9.9	34.4	65.6
Hede	3.0	1,089	9.7	10.3	48.0	13.0	1.6	17.4	27.1	72.9
Lits-Rödön	16.9	6,237	24.6	13.1	31.8	20.2	1.8	8.4	33.1	66.9
Ragunda	12.4	4,581	47.2	16.0	9.6	20.1	1.7	5.3	52.4	47.6
Revsund-Brunflo-Näs	13.9	5,135	35.5	16.1	22.4	15.8	4.3	6.5	42.0	58.0
Sunne-Oviken-Hallen	8.1	2,977	16.5	17.5	44.8	15.8	2.5	3.0	19.4	80.6
Sveg	6.3	2,322	30.3	13.2	16.8	7.5	6.6	25.6	55.9	44.1
Undersåker-Offerdal	12.1	4,461	28.2	12.2	35.6	17.2	1.6	5.1	33.2	66.7
Östersund	11.7	4,324	26.7	38.5	15.8	1.7	5.4	11.8	38.6	61.4
Total	2.1	36,863	28.7	18.0	25.7	15.9	2.8	8.9	37.6	62.4
Source: SCB

=== Jönköping ===
Location	Share	Votes	S	AV	F	B	K	KP	Left	Right
Eksjö	3.0	2,154	31.8	40.2	20.7	5.9	0.5	0.9	33.2	66.8
Gränna	0.6	423	10.2	65.0	22.9	0.5	0.5	0.9	11.6	88.4
Huskvarna	3.7	2,665	41.1	26.4	15.8	0.1	5.2	11.4	57.7	42.3
Jönköping	12.7	9,083	37.1	36.8	21.9	0.5	0.2	3.5	40.8	59.2
Mo	3.4	2,416	8.5	50.1	27.4	13.3	0.1	0.5	9.1	90.9
Norra Vedbo	6.2	4,413	16.4	38.4	23.7	17.5	2.2	1.8	20.3	79.6
Nässjö	3.8	2,733	46.8	25.4	22.1	0.5	4.6	0.6	52.0	48.0
Södra Vedbo	7.2	5,154	22.0	16.9	24.8	32.8	2.0	1.5	25.5	74.5
Tranås	2.7	1,900	29.8	26.2	34.3	0.0	2.7	7.1	39.5	60.5
Tveta	9.6	6,855	28.2	33.2	18.4	12.5	1.3	6.4	35.9	64.1
Vetlanda	1.7	1,238	36.8	28.4	20.2	1.9	4.4	8.2	49.5	50.5
Vista	3.0	2,133	4.0	67.9	11.8	15.4	0.3	0.7	4.9	95.1
Värnamo	1.6	1,136	39.6	34.3	20.1	0.6	3.0	2.4	45.0	55.0
Västbo	13.2	9,409	20.4	28.5	18.8	29.9	1.8	0.7	22.9	77.1
Västra	10.5	7,515	17.4	18.5	28.8	32.2	2.7	0.4	20.5	79.4
Östbo	8.5	6,080	17.2	49.0	19.7	11.8	0.8	1.6	19.6	80.4
Östra	8.4	5,965	18.9	18.6	29.9	27.9	2.4	2.2	23.6	76.4
Postal vote	0.1	72								
Total	4.0	71,344	24.4	32.0	22.6	16.6	1.8	2.6	28.9	71.1
Source: SCB

=== Kalmar ===
Location	Share	Votes	S	AV	F	B	LP	K	KP	Left	Right
Algutsrum	2.6	1,548	19.0	40.3	0.6	37.0	3.1	0.0	0.0	19.0	81.0
Aspeland	6.0	3,560	27.8	31.5	11.4	22.6	3.5	3.1	0.1	31.0	69.0
Borgholm	0.7	398	19.3	34.4	29.4	14.8	1.3	0.0	0.8	20.1	79.9
Gräsgård	2.2	1,336	34.2	22.2	1.0	37.5	4.9	0.1	0.0	34.4	65.6
Handbörd	5.5	3,284	29.2	40.9	4.6	13.9	3.5	8.0	0.0	37.2	62.8
Kalmar	9.1	5,443	43.0	42.9	2.6	0.1	9.5	0.0	1.9	44.9	55.1
Möckleby	1.3	788	2.8	49.9	0.1	46.8	0.3	0.0	0.0	2.8	97.1
Norra Möre	5.0	2,983	26.8	40.9	1.7	22.8	5.6	2.2	0.0	29.0	71.0
Norra Tjust	6.7	3,993	30.0	44.7	5.4	11.8	3.4	4.7	0.0	34.7	65.3
Oskarshamn	4.3	2,570	46.8	27.7	12.3	0.4	4.6	8.2	0.0	54.9	45.1
Runsten	1.7	992	2.1	13.7	0.8	80.9	2.2	0.2	0.0	2.3	97.7
Sevede	6.9	4,085	18.8	40.4	11.5	21.7	2.9	2.0	2.7	23.5	76.5
Slättbo	1.4	818	13.2	16.6	2.0	65.0	0.2	2.9	0.0	16.1	83.9
Stranda	6.5	3,882	32.1	28.8	8.7	15.9	3.0	11.5	0.0	43.6	56.4
Södra Möre	17.3	10,318	25.8	37.5	7.9	20.0	4.8	3.3	0.8	29.9	70.1
Södra Tjust	9.2	5,459	27.1	33.0	8.6	18.3	4.1	6.9	1.9	35.9	64.1
Tunalän	4.3	2,549	16.3	53.5	7.0	14.9	5.7	2.6	0.0	18.9	81.1
Vimmerby	1.4	851	20.3	57.2	20.4	1.8	0.0	0.1	0.1	20.6	79.4
Västervik	5.2	3,128	23.2	35.2	15.0	0.1	8.5	17.1	1.0	41.3	58.7
Åkerbo	2.7	1,593	5.3	5.0	1.9	87.1	0.7	0.0	0.0	5.3	94.7
Postal vote	0.0	11									
Total	3.4	59,589	26.9	36.4	7.4	19.5	4.5	4.6	0.7	32.2	67.8
Source: SCB

=== Kopparberg ===
Location	Share	Votes	S	AV	F	B	LP	K	KP	Left	Right
Avesta	2.1	1,560	48.9	11.0	11.9	0.1	4.6	22.8	0.1	72.4	27.6
Falu Norra	9.2	6,739	39.0	8.9	28.9	8.4	1.2	8.1	5.5	52.6	47.4
Falu Södra	12.7	9,343	44.2	7.0	17.0	15.2	0.8	11.2	4.5	60.0	40.0
Falun	5.3	3,888	38.3	32.5	19.9	0.1	5.4	2.6	1.1	42.1	57.9
Folkare	7.0	5,099	48.2	15.0	13.2	13.3	2.4	7.9	0.1	56.2	43.8
Hedemora	1.6	1,147	36.9	29.5	24.3	2.2	6.0	1.1	0.0	38.0	62.0
Hedemora ting	8.9	6,537	49.0	7.7	10.4	27.7	1.1	2.9	1.1	53.0	47.0
Leksand-Gagnef	9.6	7,021	23.0	6.0	50.8	14.2	1.0	4.0	0.9	27.9	72.1
Ludvika	2.2	1,606	56.0	17.9	7.9	0.1	9.2	6.3	2.6	64.9	35.1
Malung	5.3	3,887	39.9	11.9	34.9	4.3	2.0	3.6	3.4	46.9	53.1
Mora	6.5	4,744	37.4	9.8	34.8	5.5	6.2	3.0	3.4	43.7	56.3
Nås	6.5	4,778	43.4	7.5	15.1	14.9	1.3	14.6	3.2	61.2	38.8
Orsa	2.5	1,827	37.5	13.3	30.5	12.5	1.7	1.9	2.6	42.0	58.0
Rättvik	4.2	3,059	25.6	5.7	37.6	16.6	1.8	7.4	5.3	38.3	61.7
Särna-Idre	0.7	487	32.2	14.2	47.2	0.0	3.1	1.4	1.8	35.5	64.5
Säter	0.9	687	56.2	20.1	19.4	0.0	4.4	0.0	0.0	56.2	43.8
Västerbergslag	12.9	9,477	59.8	9.0	11.6	6.1	0.9	8.6	4.1	72.5	27.5
Älvdalen	1.9	1,397	50.3	14.2	25.9	5.9	1.4	1.9	0.4	52.5	47.5
Postal vote	0.0	35									
Total	4.2	73,318	42.9	10.9	23.3	11.0	2.2	7.0	2.8	52.7	47.3
Source: SCB

=== Kristianstad ===
Location	Share	Votes	S	AV	F	B	K	KP	Left	Right
Albo	3.5	2,360	27.4	16.1	48.1	6.4	2.1	0.0	29.4	70.6
Bjäre	5.8	3,950	26.1	40.4	6.1	26.5	0.0	0.9	26.9	73.1
Gärd	10.5	7,175	44.5	13.2	35.6	5.9	0.4	0.4	45.3	54.7
Hässleholm	1.7	1,177	46.6	27.0	23.5	0.6	0.0	2.3	48.9	51.1
Ingelstad	9.8	6,681	37.0	17.8	31.2	13.8	0.0	0.1	37.2	62.8
Järrestad	3.1	2,132	43.7	15.6	26.6	13.9	0.0	0.1	43.8	56.2
Kristianstad	6.6	4,498	42.8	37.3	17.5	0.6	1.8	0.0	44.5	55.5
Norra Åsbo	11.2	7,619	36.1	31.7	11.6	20.1	0.2	0.3	36.5	63.5
Simrishamn	1.2	805	49.9	34.5	15.2	0.4	0.0	0.0	49.9	50.1
Södra Åsbo	7.4	5,054	49.2	28.7	4.8	17.0	0.1	0.3	49.5	50.5
Villand	10.1	6,912	44.6	21.2	24.2	5.2	3.5	1.3	49.3	50.7
Västra Göinge	14.0	9,575	24.7	22.2	33.7	18.2	0.2	1.0	25.9	74.1
Ängelholm	3.1	2,082	58.1	36.5	4.4	0.0	0.0	1.0	59.1	40.9
Östra Göinge	12.0	8,190	35.2	21.9	25.7	13.3	3.0	1.0	39.1	60.9
Postal vote	0.0	31								
Total	3.9	68,241	38.0	24.5	23.4	12.4	1.0	0.6	39.6	60.4
Source: SCB

=== Kronoberg ===
Location	Share	Votes	S	AV	F	B	K	KP	Left	Right
Allbo	19.7	9,049	28.0	41.6	9.4	18.1	1.2	1.7	30.9	69.1
Kinnevald	10.9	5,002	20.9	54.3	6.3	17.7	0.6	0.3	21.7	78.3
Konga	18.4	8,427	33.6	36.1	9.3	16.6	3.2	1.1	38.0	62.0
Norrvidinge	5.4	2,490	23.4	34.1	11.8	30.5	0.0	0.2	23.6	76.4
Sunnerbo	22.4	10,299	22.5	42.4	17.8	16.1	0.5	0.7	23.7	76.3
Uppvidinge	16.4	7,543	40.6	21.5	12.8	18.1	3.5	3.5	47.6	52.4
Växjö	6.7	3,079	37.4	49.0	9.0	0.7	0.8	3.0	41.2	58.8
Postal vote	0.0	6								
Total	2.6	45,895	29.5	39.0	11.6	16.8	1.6	1.5	32.6	67.4
Source: SCB

=== Malmöhus ===
==== Malmö area ====
Location	Share	Votes	S	AV	F	LP	K	Left	Right
Hälsingborg	24.7	19,052	53.4	38.8	2.1	3.3	2.5	55.8	44.2
Landskrona	9.7	7,464	65.9	30.1	2.6	0.3	1.2	67.1	32.9
Lund	12.0	9,279	50.9	43.5	1.3	2.0	2.3	53.2	46.8
Malmö	53.6	41,345	60.6	32.2	4.2	1.1	2.0	62.6	37.4
Postal vote	0.1	56							
Total	4.0	77,196	58.1	35.0	4.0	0.8	2.1	60.2	39.8
Source: SCB

==== Malmöhus County ====
The Höglund Communists got nine votes in Skytt Hundred, but have not been listed since they gained no votes elsewhere.

Location	Share	Votes	S	AV	F	B	LP	K	Left	Right
Bara	8.5	8,178	64.6	16.6	0.9	15.4	2.4	0.1	64.7	35.3
Eslöv	2.3	2,181	53.2	36.4	3.1	1.2	6.1	0.0	53.2	46.8
Frosta	7.8	7,500	30.8	12.2	3.9	22.6	30.5	0.0	30.8	69.2
Färs	7.3	7,056	36.0	9.2	2.9	24.1	27.8	0.0	36.0	64.0
Harjager	5.1	4,929	53.7	14.0	1.2	27.0	3.5	0.6	54.4	45.6
Herrestad	2.5	2,443	64.1	10.1	1.8	12.2	11.9	0.0	64.1	35.9
Ljunit	1.8	1,782	57.3	15.8	1.2	16.1	9.6	0.0	57.3	42.7
Luggude	16.4	15,873	59.4	13.5	1.6	23.2	2.2	0.1	59.5	40.5
Onsjö	5.7	5,537	44.8	9.0	1.9	39.8	4.4	0.1	45.0	55.0
Oxie	8.9	8,625	65.5	11.6	2.6	18.7	1.3	0.3	65.8	34.2
Rönneberg	4.7	4,526	57.2	19.0	1.5	20.2	2.1	0.0	57.2	42.8
Skanör-Falsterbo	0.3	304	23.7	41.8	27.0	3.6	3.9	0.0	23.7	76.3
Skytt	5.1	4,933	49.4	17.3	2.3	26.6	3.9	0.3	49.9	50.1
Torna	7.3	7,093	48.4	13.4	1.3	30.5	6.3	0.1	48.5	51.5
Trälleborg	4.3	4,133	61.5	23.2	6.1	0.5	5.0	3.6	65.2	34.8
Vemmenhög	7.4	7,203	49.6	13.6	3.4	28.6	4.5	0.2	49.8	50.2
Ystad	4.6	4,421	61.1	29.6	4.7	0.2	4.4	0.0	61.1	38.8
Postal vote	0.0	22								
Total	5.5	96,739	53.2	15.1	2.5	21.3	7.6	0.3	53.5	46.5
Source: SCB

=== Norrbotten ===
Location	Share	Votes	S	AV	F	B	K	KP	Left	Right
Arjeplog	0.7	262	21.8	37.4	17.6	0.0	15.6	7.6	45.0	55.0
Arvidsjaur	3.0	1,211	7.6	33.6	12.1	9.5	28.2	9.1	44.8	55.2
Boden	4.7	1,904	34.6	33.8	14.0	1.1	16.4	0.1	51.1	48.9
Gällivare	9.8	3,950	19.9	36.9	4.2	0.3	36.9	2.4	58.6	41.4
Haparanda	1.8	733	26.9	52.8	10.2	0.0	10.1	0.0	37.0	63.0
Jokkmokk	2.4	967	21.2	26.0	8.2	2.0	42.2	0.5	63.9	36.1
Jukkasjärvi	7.9	3,182	25.1	16.7	7.4	0.2	48.0	2.6	75.7	24.3
Karesuando	0.1	24	0.0	100.0	0.0	0.0	0.0	0.0	0.0	100.0
Korpilombolo	1.1	458	9.0	28.8	15.1	3.1	44.1	0.0	53.1	46.9
Luleå	7.0	2,792	31.7	40.2	8.8	0.4	18.7	0.2	50.6	49.4
Nederkalix	11.1	4,439	37.7	30.7	6.8	10.6	14.3	0.0	52.0	48.0
Nederluleå	9.2	3,689	16.9	30.9	18.6	23.8	9.7	0.0	26.7	73.2
Pajala	0.9	371	8.9	41.8	19.4	16.4	11.9	1.6	22.4	77.6
Piteå	2.0	811	33.5	46.6	15.3	0.0	4.2	0.4	38.1	61.9
Piteå	12.5	5,040	34.2	24.8	14.2	12.4	13.7	0.7	48.6	51.4
Råneå	5.8	2,343	21.5	33.5	13.6	8.5	22.9	0.0	44.4	55.6
Torneå	5.7	2,274	17.2	32.8	16.9	10.6	21.9	0.5	39.6	60.4
Älvsby	3.5	1,416	18.3	12.6	10.5	30.1	25.6	3.0	46.8	53.2
Överkalix	3.2	1,301	37.9	14.2	5.6	23.4	18.9	0.0	56.8	43.2
Överluleå	7.3	2,952	18.8	18.7	15.5	16.7	29.6	0.6	49.1	50.9
Postal vote	0.1	52								
Total	2.3	40,171	25.5	29.4	11.5	9.7	22.9	1.1	49.4	50.6
Source: SCB

=== Skaraborg ===
The two Communist Parties ran under a joint list, although neither won a seat. At a district level, the results were reported as one unit for those parties.

Location	Share	Votes	S	AV	F	B	LP	K	Left	Right
Barne	5.1	3,447	9.0	55.2	21.7	13.0	0.8	0.3	9.3	90.7
Falköping	3.2	2,159	48.7	31.4	15.5	1.1	2.4	0.9	49.6	50.4
Frökind	1.1	771	4.3	54.0	10.4	31.3	0.1	0.0	4.3	95.7
Gudhem	4.6	3,133	29.9	34.3	17.5	16.8	1.1	0.2	30.1	69.7
Hjo	1.5	1,001	19.5	43.8	29.4	1.3	3.9	2.2	21.7	78.3
Kinne	4.8	3,271	34.1	21.3	33.4	6.0	1.9	3.2	37.4	62.6
Kinnefjärding	2.8	1,912	20.0	39.0	27.0	13.7	0.3	0.0	20.0	80.0
Kåkind	5.5	3,689	16.9	23.6	26.3	28.4	0.9	3.9	20.8	79.2
Kålland	4.6	3,128	13.5	45.4	31.6	8.6	0.7	0.2	13.7	86.3
Laske	2.0	1,382	8.2	47.4	23.8	20.1	0.5	0.0	8.2	91.8
Lidköping	4.5	3,065	47.9	29.2	15.1	0.0	1.3	6.5	54.4	45.6
Mariestad	3.3	2,226	42.9	35.6	17.0	0.2	2.0	2.3	45.2	54.8
Skara	3.3	2,224	34.2	33.6	27.3	0.4	1.4	3.0	37.2	62.8
Skåning	5.1	3,480	17.2	38.6	27.6	15.4	0.8	0.4	17.6	82.4
Skövde	4.8	3,251	28.8	44.7	14.8	2.1	3.5	6.1	34.9	65.1
Tidaholm	2.4	1,631	62.7	15.6	15.0	0.1	0.9	5.8	68.5	31.5
Vadsbo	20.3	13,734	29.4	29.7	14.8	22.2	3.4	0.5	29.9	70.1
Valle	2.0	1,326	28.4	36.6	21.3	10.4	1.9	1.4	29.8	70.2
Vartofta	10.1	6,858	25.7	28.1	15.1	30.1	0.3	0.6	26.3	73.7
Vilske	2.7	1,828	10.6	49.3	15.0	24.3	0.8	0.0	10.6	89.4
Viste	4.1	2,804	8.5	59.7	24.0	6.8	0.4	0.6	9.1	90.9
Åse	2.0	1,339	20.5	44.7	18.5	15.5	0.7	0.0	20.5	79.5
Total	3.8	67,659	26.3	35.5	20.1	14.8	1.6	1.6	27.9	72.1
Source: SCB

=== Stockholm ===
==== Stockholm (city) ====
Location	Share	Votes	S	AV	F	LP	K	KP	Left	Right
Stockholm	100.0	162,358	48.7	34.0	4.4	7.1	4.2	1.5	54.5	45.5
Total	9.2	162,358	48.7	34.0	4.4	7.1	4.2	1.5	54.5	45.5
Source: SCB

==== Stockholm County ====
Location	Share	Votes	S	AV	F	B	LP	K	KP	Left	Right
Bro-Vätö	1.4	1,069	24.8	45.2	11.6	12.5	0.3	5.6	0.0	30.4	69.6
Danderyd	16.6	12,425	50.0	29.2	5.6	0.6	6.4	6.9	1.3	58.2	41.8
Djursholm	2.9	2,144	27.2	59.7	4.5	0.4	6.9	0.9	0.3	28.5	71.5
Frösåker	4.8	3,553	41.5	22.3	9.3	19.8	0.4	6.7	0.0	48.3	51.7
Frötuna-Länna	2.2	1,619	17.0	39.6	18.2	24.0	1.1	0.2	0.0	17.2	82.8
Färentuna	2.8	2,126	51.0	7.8	6.8	28.2	4.4	1.8	0.0	52.9	47.1
Lyhundra	2.0	1,479	18.1	48.0	11.6	19.1	1.2	2.0	0.0	20.1	79.9
Långhundra	1.6	1,222	34.8	12.9	10.3	37.6	3.4	1.0	0.0	35.8	64.2
Norrtälje	2.4	1,809	33.7	49.2	13.7	0.4	0.9	2.1	0.0	35.8	64.2
Närdinghundra	3.6	2,682	43.1	15.3	11.7	21.8	2.2	5.7	0.2	49.0	51.0
Seminghundra	1.6	1,189	28.8	10.9	10.5	45.2	3.5	0.9	0.0	29.8	70.2
Sigtuna	0.3	244	33.6	52.0	8.2	2.9	2.5	0.0	0.8	34.4	65.6
Sjuhundra	2.1	1,576	50.5	28.9	12.8	3.1	3.0	1.6	0.0	52.2	47.8
Sollentuna	10.9	8,163	61.4	14.8	7.9	1.8	6.6	5.2	2.3	68.9	31.1
Sotholm	6.1	4,534	50.2	12.7	9.9	18.2	5.5	5.2	0.3	53.7	46.3
Svartlösa	11.5	8,609	51.7	29.0	5.5	1.6	5.1	6.6	0.5	58.8	41.2
Södertälje	7.0	5,226	51.3	26.7	6.4	0.0	6.6	4.8	4.3	60.4	39.6
Vallentuna	2.3	1,699	42.3	15.8	8.5	21.0	4.6	5.5	2.4	50.1	49.9
Vaxholm	1.6	1,195	29.6	36.2	5.9	3.8	20.1	4.2	0.0	33.8	66.0
Väddö-Häverö	4.1	3,075	32.1	24.2	8.0	21.7	1.2	12.7	0.0	44.8	55.2
Värmdö	3.4	2,571	56.1	19.6	10.5	6.1	4.0	3.7	0.0	59.8	40.2
Åker	2.0	1,489	38.6	11.4	10.5	33.8	5.4	0.3	0.0	39.0	61.0
Ärlinghundra	2.0	1,505	40.8	17.4	13.5	21.4	4.3	2.0	0.6	43.4	56.6
Öknebo	3.9	2,891	59.8	15.3	8.7	9.6	1.9	4.0	0.7	64.5	35.5
Öregrund	0.4	273	22.3	35.5	25.6	0.7	9.5	6.2	0.0	28.6	71.4
Östhammar	0.4	334	17.1	35.3	37.1	3.3	4.2	2.4	0.0	19.5	79.9
Postal vote	0.1	44									
Total	4.2	74,745	46.1	24.9	8.5	9.8	4.8	5.1	1.0	52.1	47.9
Source:SCB

=== Södermanland ===
Location	Share	Votes	S	AV	F	B	LP	K	KP	Left	Right
Daga	4.4	2,556	41.2	21.8	21.9	12.9	1.4	0.8	0.0	42.0	58.0
Eskilstuna	19.7	11,462	66.9	15.3	13.2	1.0	0.1	2.7	1.0	70.5	29.5
Hölebo	2.6	1,539	49.3	12.6	18.2	18.1	1.8	0.0	0.0	49.3	50.7
Jönåker	9.1	5,260	55.9	12.1	18.6	5.8	3.7	2.6	1.4	59.9	40.1
Katrineholm	4.8	2,807	52.3	18.7	20.9	0.2	0.6	1.3	6.1	59.7	40.3
Mariefred	0.9	540	37.4	29.1	28.9	2.8	0.9	0.9	0.0	38.3	61.7
Nyköping	6.3	3,665	53.6	26.5	14.2	0.3	2.0	3.5	0.0	57.1	42.9
Oppunda	18.1	10,529	49.2	10.9	27.0	9.8	1.4	0.6	1.1	50.9	49.1
Rönö	5.0	2,909	44.0	17.9	21.8	10.9	5.0	0.4	0.0	44.4	55.6
Selebo	2.7	1,547	42.0	18.7	13.3	22.4	1.2	2.5	0.0	44.4	55.6
Strängnäs	2.8	1,611	32.3	52.3	14.0	0.1	0.6	0.7	0.0	33.0	67.0
Torshälla	1.3	747	62.1	19.1	8.7	5.8	0.5	2.5	1.2	65.9	34.1
Trosa	0.5	272	30.1	46.0	16.9	3.7	3.3	0.0	0.0	30.1	69.9
Villåttinge	7.9	4,582	46.7	16.7	23.6	7.6	1.7	3.2	0.5	50.4	49.6
Västerrekarne	4.3	2,506	42.4	9.6	31.6	12.6	0.7	1.8	1.2	45.5	54.5
Åker	4.0	2,341	51.8	16.2	16.2	10.2	5.0	0.6	0.0	52.4	47.6
Österrekarne	5.5	3,202	44.9	14.2	31.0	5.9	2.6	1.4	0.0	46.3	53.7
Postal vote	0.0	17									
Total	3.3	58,092	51.8	16.7	20.4	6.7	1.7	1.8	0.9	54.5	45.5
Source: SCB

=== Uppsala ===
Location	Share	Votes	S	AV	F	B	LP	K	Left	Right
Bro	2.6	1,079	65.4	23.4	1.2	4.3	4.7	1.0	66.5	33.5
Bälinge	2.1	887	20.9	12.2	20.4	39.2	7.0	0.3	21.2	78.8
Enköping	4.9	2,033	46.8	36.9	12.3	1.8	1.1	1.1	47.9	52.1
Hagunda	3.1	1,267	33.2	20.8	18.9	20.6	0.6	1.8	35.0	65.0
Håbo	2.9	1,206	52.8	27.7	7.0	9.4	2.4	0.7	53.6	46.4
Lagunda	2.7	1,117	33.3	21.7	12.1	27.9	4.8	0.2	33.5	66.5
Norunda	4.1	1,682	34.1	11.5	27.2	18.8	5.1	3.2	37.3	62.7
Oland	15.2	6,290	36.7	10.7	28.6	13.1	2.5	8.4	45.1	54.9
Rasbo	2.1	858	41.1	21.7	18.8	14.3	4.0	0.0	41.1	58.7
Trögd	6.6	2,710	38.8	20.8	6.1	33.1	1.2	0.0	38.8	61.2
Ulleråker	3.7	1,508	50.7	20.4	12.3	9.7	4.2	2.7	53.4	46.6
Uppsala	22.7	9,393	39.5	40.2	10.3	0.4	6.5	3.0	42.6	57.4
Vaksala	2.5	1,041	46.9	21.8	10.5	14.6	4.6	1.6	48.5	51.5
Åsunda	3.5	1,436	30.0	23.0	10.0	33.3	0.3	1.8	31.8	68.2
Örbyhus	21.1	8,734	63.9	6.7	14.3	9.5	1.1	4.4	68.3	31.7
Postal vote	0.2	64								
Total	2.3	41,305	44.9	21.4	14.9	12.0	3.4	3.4	48.3	51.7
Source: SCB

=== Värmland ===
Location	Share	Votes	S	AV	F	B	LP	K	KP	Left	Right
Arvika	3.0	2,306	43.1	21.9	22.5	0.5	2.1	9.8	0.0	52.9	47.1
Filipstad	2.2	1,645	39.9	35.9	16.7	0.0	2.7	3.4	1.4	44.7	55.3
Fryksdal	11.2	8,543	26.8	16.7	20.8	25.0	2.5	8.0	0.2	35.0	65.0
Färnebo	8.2	6,240	60.6	7.0	13.3	1.7	0.5	10.5	6.4	77.6	22.4
Gillberg	4.8	3,630	34.5	15.8	25.8	12.7	2.8	6.9	1.4	42.8	57.2
Grums	4.0	3,050	61.1	8.2	12.2	11.1	2.3	2.6	2.5	66.2	33.8
Jösse	9.5	7,224	39.3	17.8	20.9	10.8	2.3	8.1	0.7	48.2	51.8
Karlstad	7.9	6,064	51.3	29.6	8.7	0.8	6.7	2.2	0.7	54.2	45.8
Karlstad Hundred	5.7	4,370	62.4	9.6	10.3	4.2	2.1	6.9	4.5	73.8	26.2
Kil	8.0	6,119	53.2	7.6	15.5	12.4	2.1	4.1	5.1	62.4	37.6
Kristinehamn	4.8	3,651	49.4	25.0	20.2	0.0	0.8	1.0	3.5	53.9	46.1
Nordmark	5.6	4,295	25.0	19.7	34.1	10.4	9.0	1.5	0.3	26.8	73.2
Nyed	2.3	1,786	36.2	17.6	23.1	10.3	3.2	4.6	4.9	45.8	54.2
Näs	4.4	3,325	33.6	21.7	16.0	22.5	2.9	1.3	2.1	36.9	63.1
Visnum	3.0	2,308	34.8	21.1	26.2	8.7	0.4	8.2	0.6	43.7	56.3
Väse	3.0	2,317	30.0	19.4	36.1	11.4	2.6	0.1	0.4	30.6	69.4
Älvdal	10.8	8,259	43.5	11.9	13.7	3.6	1.8	21.2	4.3	69.1	30.9
Ölme	1.6	1,196	37.9	25.8	26.5	8.3	0.5	0.3	0.8	39.0	61.0
Postal vote	0.1	71									
Total	4.3	76,399	43.2	16.7	18.6	9.2	2.8	7.1	2.4	52.7	47.3
Source: SCB

=== Västerbotten ===
Location	Share	Votes	S	AV	F	B	LP	Left	Right
Burträsk	5.9	2,556	6.6	51.9	40.2	0.0	1.3	6.6	93.4
Degerfors	4.7	2,048	13.5	23.4	50.7	0.0	12.4	13.5	86.5
Lycksele	7.2	3,119	7.6	21.3	57.0	0.6	13.4	7.6	92.4
Nordmaling-Bjurholm	11.1	4,821	29.9	31.4	32.6	0.0	6.1	29.9	70.1
Norsjö-Malå	4.9	2,130	13.1	22.0	63.6	0.0	1.3	13.1	86.9
Nysätra	10.5	4,557	16.0	36.4	41.8	0.0	5.7	16.0	84.0
Skellefteå	2.2	975	20.4	59.7	19.9	0.0	0.0	20.4	79.6
Skellefteå ting	25.6	11,141	27.2	46.0	26.5	0.0	0.3	27.2	72.8
Umeå	4.5	1,966	19.9	47.8	22.8	0.0	9.5	19.9	80.1
Umeå ting	16.7	7,262	29.0	21.2	27.9	0.0	22.0	29.0	71.0
Vilhelmina	4.2	1,832	26.0	9.1	45.1	10.4	9.4	26.0	74.0
Åsele	2.6	1,152	10.1	21.0	62.4	1.6	4.7	10.1	89.8
Postal vote	0.0	17							
Total	2.5	43,576	21.7	33.8	40.2	0.5	3.8	21.7	78.3
Source: SCB

=== Västernorrland ===
Location	Share	Votes	S	AV	F	B	LP	K	KP	Left	Right
Boteå	6.1	4,458	51.5	12.0	6.1	16.6	0.5	2.9	10.4	64.8	35.2
Fjällsjö	4.2	3,092	52.3	20.5	6.3	12.4	0.4	5.0	3.2	60.4	39.6
Härnösand	3.4	2,502	20.3	43.1	12.2	0.0	4.4	8.5	11.6	40.3	59.7
Indal	2.4	1,761	42.3	11.1	16.0	24.1	2.9	1.7	1.4	45.9	54.1
Ljustorp	2.7	1,964	44.9	8.3	15.1	20.7	2.5	5.4	3.1	53.4	46.6
Medelpad Västra	13.1	9,587	42.3	6.8	10.5	28.8	4.0	3.1	4.5	49.9	50.1
Njurunda	4.1	2,978	59.0	5.8	7.3	11.3	1.1	10.2	5.2	74.4	25.5
Nordingrå	2.6	1,918	22.6	22.9	24.6	28.4	0.1	0.9	0.5	24.0	76.0
Nätra	7.3	5,343	37.7	12.5	28.2	19.8	0.5	0.4	0.9	39.0	61.0
Ramsele-Resele	5.8	4,264	48.5	16.3	4.5	26.2	0.3	1.6	2.6	52.7	47.3
Själevad-Arnäs	9.5	6,962	33.5	18.1	33.5	12.2	0.2	1.1	1.4	36.0	64.0
Skön	11.8	8,660	67.4	7.2	12.5	6.4	2.9	6.6	4.2	78.2	21.8
Sollefteå	1.1	808	30.4	53.0	9.8	2.7	3.3	0.0	0.7	31.2	68.8
Sollefteå ting	4.2	3,065	59.8	12.9	3.4	19.0	0.6	0.3	4.0	64.1	35.9
Sundsvall	6.2	4,532	36.5	45.3	7.2	0.7	8.8	0.6	1.2	38.3	61.7
Ångermanland Södra	13.9	10,209	49.6	7.0	13.3	10.7	0.7	8.5	10.2	68.3	31.7
Örnsköldsvik	1.5	1,120	25.0	43.8	26.6	0.3	1.1	0.9	2.4	28.3	71.7
Postal vote	0.1	48									
Total	4.1	73,271	45.9	15.3	13.2	14.9	2.0	4.0	4.6	54.5	45.5
Source: SCB

=== Västmanland ===
The two Communist Parties ran on a joint list, although their overall constituency results were reported separately.

Location	Share	Votes	S	AV	F	B	LP	K	Left	Right
Arboga	3.2	1,569	50.7	24.4	20.7	1.1	3.0	0.1	50.9	49.1
Gamla Norberg	11.0	5,411	65.5	11.9	9.2	4.7	1.3	7.4	72.9	27.1
Köping	4.3	2,146	33.0	30.8	19.5	9.2	0.9	6.7	39.7	60.3
Norrbo	4.1	2,030	54.4	5.1	10.4	26.1	2.6	1.3	55.8	44.2
Sala	4.3	2,134	43.5	35.9	13.2	0.7	2.1	4.6	48.1	51.9
Siende	2.9	1,411	52.4	10.1	6.5	20.9	6.7	3.5	55.8	44.2
Simtuna	6.0	2,954	32.7	18.7	25.5	19.2	1.2	2.7	35.4	64.6
Skinnskatteberg	4.2	2,047	59.6	11.3	12.0	2.9	3.5	10.6	70.2	29.8
Snevringe	13.5	6,632	63.1	7.3	8.2	10.4	4.6	6.5	69.5	30.5
Torstuna	3.1	1,503	29.5	20.5	14.6	22.4	1.5	11.5	41.0	59.0
Tuhundra	1.4	688	48.7	4.9	12.1	28.5	3.8	2.0	50.7	49.3
Vagnsbro	2.4	1,185	30.5	5.0	25.7	38.6	0.2	0.0	30.5	69.5
Våla	4.5	2,217	29.1	9.7	38.0	19.4	2.1	1.7	30.9	69.1
Västerås	18.7	9,197	52.0	21.8	7.2	0.7	9.4	8.9	60.9	39.1
Yttertjurbo	1.5	731	35.8	7.8	6.8	41.3	6.6	1.6	37.5	62.5
Åkerbo	10.8	5,294	46.1	13.2	17.1	15.8	2.8	5.0	51.2	48.8
Övertjurbo	3.9	1,926	26.8	12.1	17.3	41.6	1.2	1.0	27.8	72.2
Postal vote	0.0	21								
Total	2.8	49,096	48.9	15.5	13.8	12.3	3.9	5.7	54.5	45.5
Source: SCB

=== Älvsborg ===
==== Älvsborg N ====
Location	Share	Votes	S	AV	F	B	LP	K	KP	Left	Right
Ale	8.7	4,156	36.0	22.8	10.2	24.2	2.5	0.6	3.8	40.4	59.6
Alingsås	4.5	2,150	38.8	34.4	17.4	0.0	3.6	0.5	5.3	44.7	55.3
Bjärke	2.2	1,036	10.5	33.4	46.9	7.0	2.1	0.0	0.0	10.5	89.5
Flundre	4.5	2,149	66.8	12.8	2.8	14.7	2.1	0.1	0.7	67.6	32.4
Gäsene	6.9	3,321	7.8	51.4	23.9	15.7	1.0	0.0	0.2	8.0	92.0
Kulling	10.5	5,039	18.8	34.5	34.6	8.5	2.3	0.1	1.2	20.1	79.9
Nordal	4.8	2,322	33.2	18.5	16.5	28.7	2.8	0.2	0.0	33.4	66.6
Sundal	5.8	2,779	6.6	42.4	8.6	41.5	1.0	0.0	0.0	6.6	93.4
Trollhättan	9.0	4,303	62.8	14.2	6.9	0.1	4.0	1.2	10.8	74.8	25.2
Tössbo	3.8	1,844	30.2	39.6	21.9	7.0	0.8	0.5	0.0	30.7	69.3
Valbo	6.1	2,906	26.5	37.9	5.3	24.2	3.5	0.7	1.9	29.1	70.9
Vedbo	11.0	5,293	41.4	17.0	24.0	11.7	2.2	3.5	0.2	45.1	54.9
Väne	6.2	2,984	57.5	20.0	9.6	10.2	1.4	0.0	1.2	58.8	41.2
Vänersborg	5.1	2,464	42.7	34.9	7.8	0.4	4.2	0.0	10.0	52.6	47.4
Vättle	5.7	2,731	48.4	29.0	15.7	2.9	3.1	0.1	0.8	49.2	50.8
Åmål	5.1	2,423	56.8	28.8	11.5	0.1	1.0	1.8	0.0	58.6	41.4
Postal vote	0.1	42									
Total	2.7	47,942	37.0	28.5	16.3	12.5	2.4	0.7	2.5	40.3	59.7
Source: SCB

==== Älvsborg S ====
Location	Share	Votes	S	AV	F	B	LP	K	KP	Left	Right
Bollebygd	4.4	1,741	24.1	65.0	3.5	5.2	2.2	0.0	0.0	24.1	75.9
Borås	21.9	8,709	45.7	39.5	10.3	0.4	2.0	2.0	0.3	47.8	52.2
Kind	23.5	9,352	18.3	48.7	10.8	20.4	1.5	0.2	0.2	18.7	81.3
Mark	25.6	10,182	24.6	53.1	3.6	12.2	1.1	0.2	5.2	29.9	70.1
Redväg	8.2	3,275	7.2	42.0	23.6	27.1	0.0	0.1	0.0	7.3	92.7
Ulricehamn	3.1	1,219	30.4	47.7	17.9	0.2	0.1	3.6	0.0	34.0	66.0
Veden	4.5	1,805	11.4	56.4	16.4	14.6	0.3	0.8	0.0	12.2	87.8
Ås	8.9	3,538	9.0	55.0	10.0	24.0	0.1	0.0	1.9	10.9	89.1
Postal vote	0.0	8									
Total	2.3	39,829	24.5	48.8	10.0	13.3	1.2	0.7	1.6	26.7	73.3
Source: SCB

=== Örebro ===
Location	Share	Votes	S	AV	F	B	LP	K	KP	Left	Right
Asker	4.0	2,415	29.1	13.3	43.7	8.5	3.8	1.5	0.1	30.7	69.3
Askersund	1.0	617	26.9	39.7	25.8	1.6	5.3	0.6	0.0	27.6	72.4
Edsberg	5.9	3,530	30.8	12.0	32.5	12.9	4.2	6.4	1.2	38.4	61.6
Fellingsbro	4.1	2,442	37.3	14.0	20.1	13.3	4.5	4.8	0.3	42.3	57.7
Glanshammar	2.7	1,624	25.1	12.6	32.5	13.4	15.0	1.5	0.0	26.5	73.5
Grimsten	3.8	2,300	41.6	9.8	26.5	7.8	1.6	5.3	7.3	54.3	45.7
Grythytte-Hällefors	3.8	2,274	49.1	7.2	7.3	2.0	4.4	1.5	28.5	79.1	20.9
Hardemo	0.8	505	12.3	23.4	34.1	20.2	4.2	5.5	0.4	18.2	81.8
Karlskoga	10.2	6,120	60.5	11.2	9.2	9.1	4.1	2.8	3.1	66.4	33.6
Kumla	10.2	6,161	34.7	20.6	28.1	4.1	3.9	4.2	4.4	43.3	56.7
Lindes-Ramsberg	5.3	3,177	40.2	13.3	15.2	21.4	4.8	2.7	2.3	45.2	54.8
Lindesberg	1.6	984	36.5	35.3	22.6	1.3	2.8	0.8	0.7	38.0	62.0
Nora	1.5	931	23.6	40.5	18.0	0.4	5.9	2.8	8.7	35.1	64.9
Nora-Hjulsjö	4.2	2,514	51.0	12.4	14.5	7.3	4.1	1.7	9.0	61.7	38.3
Nya Kopparberg	5.1	3,096	66.4	12.4	11.3	2.2	4.0	2.4	1.3	70.0	30.0
Sköllersta	4.5	2,689	27.7	16.0	44.4	5.7	4.3	1.5	0.4	29.6	70.4
Sundbo	4.5	2,692	49.4	13.8	12.4	17.2	3.2	1.9	2.0	53.3	46.7
Örebro	18.0	10,845	51.6	19.8	12.0	0.0	11.8	3.9	0.8	56.4	43.6
Örebro Hundred	9.5	5,736	50.9	16.8	17.2	2.8	7.8	3.8	0.7	55.4	44.6
Postal vote	0.0	20									
Total	3.4	60,272	44.6	16.3	19.8	6.7	6.0	3.3	3.2	51.1	48.9
Source: SCB

=== Östergötland ===
Location	Share	Votes	S	AV	F	B	LP	K	KP	Left	Right
Aska	5.0	4,739	52.4	19.3	8.6	9.8	3.0	3.5	3.5	59.4	40.6
Bankekind	3.9	3,725	48.3	11.6	7.2	18.1	12.8	0.3	1.7	50.3	49.7
Björkekind	1.2	1,102	24.1	19.3	4.8	47.2	4.5	0.0	0.0	24.1	75.9
Boberg	2.4	2,296	37.1	26.7	5.5	22.0	3.2	4.5	1.0	42.6	57.4
Bråbo	1.9	1,807	68.6	17.0	5.1	1.9	1.4	3.2	2.8	74.5	25.5
Dal	1.2	1,126	35.4	26.5	3.3	25.2	4.4	4.6	0.6	40.7	59.3
Finspånga län	8.6	8,205	50.1	10.6	11.7	17.9	2.9	3.0	3.7	56.8	43.2
Gullberg	2.0	1,864	38.5	17.4	4.0	21.2	8.8	5.5	4.6	48.6	51.4
Göstring	4.8	4,573	35.4	20.1	10.9	17.9	4.8	10.2	0.8	46.4	53.6
Hammarkind	4.4	4,150	36.5	22.9	7.7	19.3	10.0	2.0	1.6	40.1	59.8
Hanekind	2.2	2,142	37.9	28.9	6.6	20.2	6.2	0.1	0.0	38.0	62.0
Kinda	5.7	5,408	35.1	27.2	9.3	20.3	7.7	0.3	0.2	35.6	64.4
Linköping	8.7	8,313	40.5	39.5	7.5	0.9	8.9	0.7	2.0	43.3	56.7
Lysing	2.9	2,791	22.6	35.9	13.7	21.7	3.8	1.9	0.4	24.9	75.1
Lösing	1.6	1,546	59.3	12.5	4.7	20.8	2.2	0.5	0.1	59.9	40.1
Memming	3.2	3,022	54.2	26.2	7.2	1.8	5.0	2.6	3.0	59.8	40.2
Mjölby	2.4	2,310	52.1	24.6	11.4	2.3	5.4	3.2	1.0	56.3	43.7
Motala	1.8	1,718	30.7	39.6	18.0	0.2	3.7	5.8	2.0	38.4	61.6
Norrköping	23.0	21,917	56.5	31.8	4.6	0.7	2.2	2.7	1.5	60.7	39.3
Skänninge	0.5	475	27.8	41.7	17.5	1.1	10.1	1.5	0.4	29.7	70.3
Skärkind	1.5	1,411	43.3	17.8	4.6	23.9	9.1	0.4	0.9	44.6	55.4
Söderköping	0.9	828	40.6	38.4	6.4	1.7	9.5	0.6	2.8	44.0	56.0
Vadstena	1.2	1,118	35.8	37.1	16.6	2.1	4.8	3.0	0.4	39.3	60.7
Valkebo	2.1	1,956	34.6	27.1	8.8	20.5	9.0	0.1	0.0	34.6	65.4
Vifolka	2.3	2,201	33.2	32.2	9.8	15.2	4.6	4.6	0.4	38.2	61.8
Ydre	2.2	2,130	28.2	13.6	21.7	32.0	3.1	0.0	1.4	29.6	70.4
Åkerbo	1.0	999	19.2	41.8	7.0	21.9	9.8	0.0	0.2	19.4	80.6
Östkind	1.5	1,422	25.7	18.8	7.2	42.9	5.4	0.0	0.0	25.7	74.3
Postal vote	0.0	42									
Total	5.4	95,336	44.5	26.1	8.2	11.9	5.2	2.5	1.6	48.7	51.3
Source: SCB
