= Arbetar-Tidningen =

Swedish communist newspaper

- Founded: 1929
- Ceased publication: 1974
- Political alignment: Communist
- Language: Swedish
- City: Gothenburg

Arbetar-Tidningen (also known as AT; meaning Workers' Newspaper in English) was a communist newspaper from Gothenburg, Sweden, published between 1929 and 1974.

== History and profile ==
AB paper was started directly after the 1929 split of the Communist Party of Sweden (SKP), when the Kilbom faction took the regional SKP publication Väst-Svenska Kuriren with them. AT functioned as the regional publication of the SKP led by Hugo Sillén. The first edition was published on 7 November 1929.

During World War II, AT became the most frequently confiscated newspaper in Sweden. Thirty-four editions of the paper were confiscated by the authorities. In March 1940, a ban on transportations was imposed on the paper, making it illegal to transport it by public transportation systems. Then it was printed at the Ny Dag press in Stockholm. Three stencil editions were brought out clandestinely in Göteborg, until the party was able to arrange a private printing company to print the paper. When the transportation ban was lifted in 1943, the printing was shifted back to Stockholm. The editor of AT during the war was Nils Holmberg.

In 1949, a separate AT printing press was established in Göteborg. In 1950 the readership of AT reached its peak with a circulation of 13,000 copies.

In 1974, AT was merged with the main party publication, Ny Dag.

== See also ==
- List of newspapers in Sweden
