= Left Party (Sweden) =

Socialist political party in Sweden

Left Party Vänsterpartiet
- Abbreviation: V
- Chairperson: Nooshi Dadgostar
- Secretary: Maria Forsberg
- Parliamentary group leader: Samuel Gonzalez Westling
- Founders: Zeth Höglund; Carl Winberg
- Founded: 13 May 1917; 109 years ago
- Split from: Swedish Social Democratic Party
- Headquarters: Kungsgatan 84, Stockholm
- Youth wing: Young Left
- Membership (2023): ▼26,942
- Ideology: Socialism; Eco-socialism; Euroscepticism; Republicanism
- Political position: Left-wing
- European affiliation: European Left Alliance for the People and the Planet
- European Parliament group: The Left in the European Parliament
- Nordic affiliation: Nordic Green Left Alliance
- Colours: Crimson; Red; White
- Riksdag: 30 / 349
- European Parliament: 2 / 21
- County councils: 147 / 1,720
- Municipal councils: 811 / 12,614

Website
- vansterpartiet.se

The Left Party (Swedish: Vänsterpartiet [ˈvɛ̂nːstɛrpaˌʈiːɛt], V) is a socialist political party in Sweden. On economic issues, the party opposes privatisation and advocates for increased public expenditures. In foreign policy, the party is Eurosceptic, being critical of the European Union, NATO, and opposing Sweden's entry into the eurozone. It attempted to get Sweden to join the Non-Aligned Movement in 1980, but did not succeed. The party is eco-socialist and supports republicanism. It stands on the left wing of the political spectrum.

The party originates from the split of the Social Democrats in 1917, into the Swedish Social Democratic Left Party (Sveriges socialdemokratiska vänsterparti [ˈsvæ̌rjɛs sʊsɪˈɑ̂ːldɛmʊˌkrɑːtɪska ˈvɛ̂nːstɛrpaˌʈiː]; abbr. SSV), becoming the Communist Party of Sweden in 1921. In 1967, the party was renamed to Left Party – the Communists (Vänsterpartiet Kommunisterna [ˈvɛ̂nːstɛrpaˌʈiːɛt kɔmɵˈnɪ̌sːtɛɳa]; abbr. VPK); it adopted its current name in 1990. The Left Party is a member of the Nordic Green Left Alliance, and its two MEPs sit in The Left in the European Parliament (GUE/NGL) group. In 2018, the party joined "Now the People !". It is also part of the European Left Alliance for the People and the Planet, a European political party that supports an alternative to capitalism.

The party has never been part of a government at the national level; however, it has lent parliamentary support to governments led in the Riksdag by the Swedish Social Democratic Party. From 1998 to 2006, the Left Party, together with the Green Party, was in a confidence and supply arrangement with the ruling Social Democratic Persson cabinet. Between 2014 and 2019, it supported the Löfven I cabinet of Social Democrats and Greens in the Riksdag, extending this cooperation to many of Sweden's counties and municipalities, and from 2019 to 2021, until the outset of the 2021 Swedish government crisis, it offered passive support to the Löfven II cabinet formed under the January Agreement, though disagreeing with some of the policies mandated by the Agreement.

== History ==
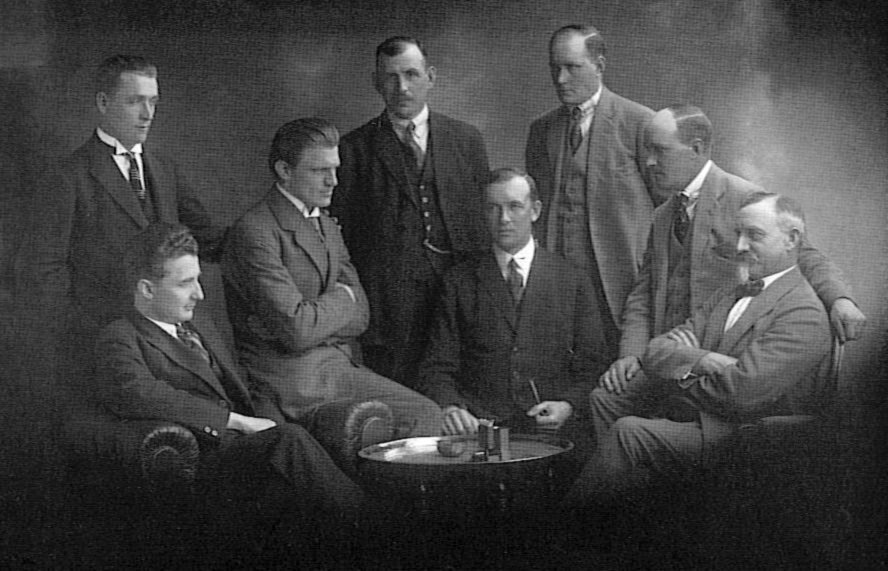
First Communist Party group in the Second Chamber of the Swedish parliament in 1922. Standing from left: Viktor Herou, Verner Karlsson, J. P. Dahlén. Sitting from left: Karl Kilbom, August Spångberg, Helmer Molander, Carl Winberg.

=== 1910s ===
Revolutionary fervour engulfed Sweden in 1917. Riots took place in many cities. In Västervik, a workers' council took control of day-to-day affairs. In Stockholm, soldiers marched together with workers on May Day. In the upper-class neighbourhood of Stockholm, Östermalm, residents formed paramilitary structures to defend themselves from a possible armed revolution.

The party originated as a split from the Swedish Social Democratic Party in 1917, as the Swedish Social Democratic Left Party (Sveriges socialdemokratiska vänsterparti, SSV). The split occurred when the Social Democratic Party did not support the 1917 Bolshevik revolution in Russia, whereas the SSV did support the Bolsheviks. Another reason for the split was the opposition to Social Democratic cooperation with the Liberals and increasing militarism. The SSV brought with them 15 of the 87 Social Democratic members of parliament and the party's youth wing. Many of the breakaways were inspired by Lenin's revolutionary Bolsheviks, others by libertarian socialism. Almost all SSV leaders eventually returned to the Social Democrats (SAP), but the foundation was laid for a party on the left wing of the labor movement.

=== 1920s ===
In 1921, in accordance with the 21 theses of the Comintern, the party name was changed to Communist Party of Sweden (Swedish: Sveriges kommunistiska parti [ˈsvæ̌rjɛs kɔmɵˈnɪ̌sːtɪska paˈʈiː], SKP [ɛskoːˈpeː]). Liberal and non-revolutionary elements were purged, later regrouping under the name SSV. In total, 6,000 out of 17,000 party members were expelled.

Zeth Höglund, the main leader of the party during the split from the Social Democrats, himself left the party in 1924. Höglund was displeased with developments in Moscow after the death of Vladimir Lenin, and thus he founded his own Communist Party, independent from the Comintern. Around 5,000 party members followed Höglund.

On 23 and 24 January 1926, the SKP organized a trade union conference with delegates representing 80,000 organized workers. This was followed in 1927 by a conference of the National Association of the Unemployed, where the party called for the abolition of the Unemployment Commission (AK).

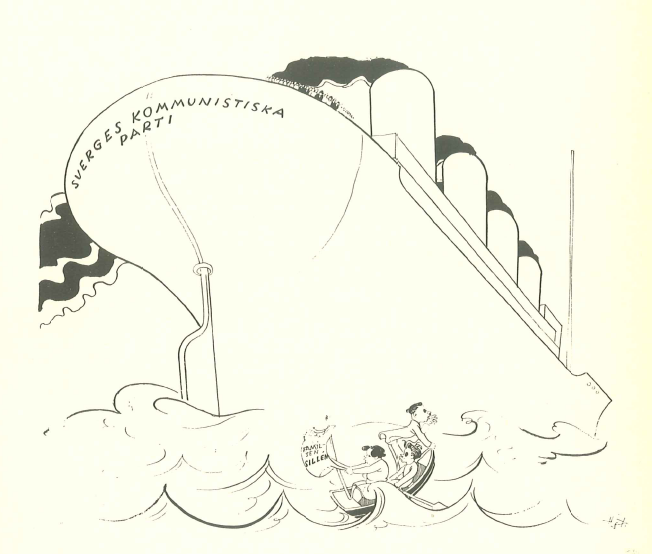
1929 caricature in Folkets Dagblad Politiken, illustrating the Kilbom-led party as a mighty cruise ship and the Sillén-led party as a small rowboat lost at sea.

In 1929, a major split, the largest in the history of the party, took place. Nils Flyg, Karl Kilbom, Ture Nerman, all MPs, and the majority of the party membership, were expelled by the Comintern. The expelled were called Kilbommare, and those loyal to the Comintern were called Sillenare (after their leader Hugo Sillén). Out of 17,300 party members, 4,000 sided with Sillén and the Comintern. Conflicts erupted locally over control of party offices and property. In Stockholm, the office of the central organ, held by the Kilbommare, was besieged by Comintern loyalists. Fist-fights erupted in Gothenburg in a clash over control of the party office. Effectively, the Kilbom-Flyg factions continued to operate their party under the name of Socialist Party, soon renamed Socialistiska partiet. Notably, they took with them the central media organ of the party, Folkets Dagblad Politiken. The SKP started new publications, including Ny Dag and Arbetar-Tidningen.

Under Sillén's leadership, the party adhered to the "class against class" line, denouncing any co-operation with the Social Democrats. Sven Linderot, a dynamic young leader, become the party chairman.

=== 1930s ===
The infamous Ådalen shootings of unarmed demonstrating workers took place in 1931. This development led to increased labour militancy and gave new life to the crisis-ridden SKP.

The Spanish Civil War began in 1936. The SKP and its youth wing sent a sizeable contingent to fight in the International Brigades. 520 Swedes took part in the brigades and 164 of them died there. Simultaneously, extensive solidarity work for the Second Spanish Republic and the people of Spain was organized in Sweden.

During the 1930s, the party was rebuilt; as the Kilbom-Flyg party crumbled, the party base was enhanced. By 1939, SKP had 19,116 members.

=== 1940s ===
The Second World War (1939–1945) was a difficult time for the SKP. The party was the sole political force in Sweden supporting the Soviet Union in the Winter War, which was frequently used as a pretext for the repression against the party. The SKP also supported Soviet military expansion along its Western border. Ny Dag, the main party organ, wrote on 26 July: "The border states have been liberated from their dependence on imperialist superpowers through the help of the great socialist worker's state." (Note: The executive editor of Ny Dag, Gustav Johansson (also a long-term Communist MP) concluded after a trip to the occupied Baltics states in 1940: "I have seen three countries, that in the past used to belong to the worst reactionary terror countries of Europe, transformed into free Soviet republics through a peaceful revolution." Both quotes found in Küng, A. Archived 4 May 2006 at the Wayback Machine)

Moreover, the party supported the Molotov–Ribbentrop Pact. The Central Committee adopted a declaration in September 1939, which read: "The ruling cliques in England and France have, in fear of Bolshevism, in their badly hidden sympathy for Fascism, in fear of workers' power in Europe, refused to enter into an agreement with conditions acceptable to the Soviet Union to effectively crush the plans of the warmongers. They have supported the Poland's refusal to accept Soviet help. The Soviet Union has thus, in clear accordance with its consequent policy of peace, through a non-aggression pact with Germany, sought to defend the 170 million people of the first socialist state against Fascist attacks and the bottomless misery of a world war."

When Nazi Germany invaded Norway in April 1940, the SKP took a neutral stance. In an article in Ny Dag, the German takeover in Norway was described as a "setback for British imperialism".

Following orders by the German delegation in Stockholm, the Swedish government took several repressive measures against the party. The main publications were effectively proscribed (they were banned from transportation, meaning it was illegal to carry SKP newspapers in any form of vehicle). Key cadres of the party and youth league were detained in camps, officially as a part of their military service. In total, 3500 people were interned at ten different camps, the great majority of them communists. Many party activists went underground, including the chairman. A complete ban on the party was discussed in government circles, but never came into effect.

In 1940, the office of the regional party organ in Norrbotten, Norrskensflamman, was bombed. Five people, including two children, were killed. This constitutes the deadliest terrorist act committed in Sweden in the twentieth century. One of the financial supporters of the group behind the attack, Paul Wretlind, was a regional leader of the Liberal Party in Stockholm.

During the war, the largest co-ordinated police action in Swedish history took place against the party. 3,000 policemen took part in raids on party offices and homes of party members all over the country. However, the raids failed to produce any evidence of any criminal activity by the party.

The party actively supported resistance struggles in Norway and Denmark. In northern Sweden, party-affiliated workers stole dynamite from mines and smuggled them to the Norwegian resistance. In other parts, the party gave shelter to anti-fascist refugees.

As the military fortunes of the Third Reich waned, the party regained a strong position in Swedish politics. In the parliamentary elections of 1944, SKP got 10.3% of the vote.

In 1945, there was a nationwide metal workers' strike, led by SKP.

In the 1946 municipal elections, the SKP received 11.2% of the vote. Party membership reached its historical peak, at 51,000. These developments, along with developments in the international arena and new Soviet policies of peaceful co-existence, led the party to initiate a re-adjustment of its role in Swedish politics. The electoral gains strengthened the perception that the party would be able to come to power within the parliamentary framework. Likewise, the idea of a "united front" with the Social Democrats gained ground in intra-party debates. The party's trade union policy was changed to adopt a less combative position towards social democracy within the trade union movement. These changes met with some resistance in the party ranks.

However, the onset of the Cold War became a difficult challenge to the party. The electoral gains of the post-war years would not last long. The prime minister Tage Erlander declared his intention to turn "every trade union into a battlefield against the communists". Communists were purged from the trade union movement. However, the party continued its development of the united front strategy.

=== 1950s ===
In the 1952 parliamentary by-elections in Jämtland and Kristianstad, the party decided to withdraw its lists, in order to ensure that the Social Democrats would not lose the elections. The party leadership argued that communists had to make an effort to "ensure a labour majority in the Riksdag". Moreover, the two concerned counties were electoral districts where it was highly unlikely that any communist MP would be elected. However, the leftist minority within the party (led by Set Persson) saw the new line as a capitulation to the Social Democrats.

Another issue concerned the youth league. The party took the initiative to create a broad-based youth movement, looking at similar developments in countries like Finland. In 1952, Democratic Youth (Demokratisk Ungdom [dɛmʊˈkrɑ̌ːtɪsk ˈɵ̂ŋdʊm]) was founded as a broad youth movement, parallel to the existing Young Communist League of Sweden. The hard-liners saw this as diluting the political character of the movement.

An issue of high symbolic importance was the party's decision to promote joint May Day rallies with the Social Democrats. Yet another issue was the decision to give financial support to the "labour press", which was essentially in the hands of the Social Democrats.

In March 1951, Hilding Hagberg became party chairman.

The intra-party polemic reached its peak at the 1953 party congress. Persson fiercely expressed his criticism, particularly towards the new party chairman Hagberg, whom he branded as an opportunist. Persson was in turn accused of being an egoist, and of wanting to divide and damage the party. Criticism was directed towards Persson by Knut Senander and Nils Holmberg, who said that Persson had to be held accountable for lack of political orientation and anti-party actions. Both Senander and Holmberg were considered as being part of the leftist faction of the party, but on this occasion they appeared as the most firebrand defenders of the party line. Only a handful of delegates defended Persson, and those who did clearly highlighted that they did not fully share Persson's critique of the line of the party leadership. In a highly emotional conclusion to the debate, Persson declared his resignation from the SKP in a speech to the congress. After his departure a purge was carried out against Persson's followers within the party, of whom several were expelled.

When Joseph Stalin died the same year, the party organized a memorial, which was addressed by C.-H. Hermansson.

When the Hungarian revolt broke out in 1956, internal party debate surged regarding the position the party should take. In the end, the party leadership chose to support the official Soviet line.

=== 1960s ===
In 1961, leading party members founded the travel agency Folkturist, which specialized in tours of Eastern Europe.

In 1964, C.-H. Hermansson was elected party chairman. Hermansson came from an academic background, unlike previous party leaders. Hermansson initiated a change in the political direction of the party towards Eurocommunism and Nordic popular socialism.

Ahead of the 1967 party congress, a heated debate took place. Several distinct tendencies were present. One section wanted to transform the party into a non-communist party, along the lines of the Danish Socialist People's Party (SF), and thus proposed that the party should change its name to Vänsterpartiet ("Left Party"). Another section, largely based amongst the trade union cadre of the party, wanted to maintain the SKP's communist character and the fraternal bond with the CPSU. Former party leader Hagberg, who was associated with the pro-Soviet group, tried to launch the name Arbetets Parti (pronounced [ˈârːbeːtɛts paˈʈiː]; "Party of Labour"), as a compromise. The party leadership came up with another compromise, and the name was changed to Left Party – the Communists (VPK). VPK continued on the Eurocommunist course, but with a loud pro-Soviet minority grouped around Norrskensflamman. Moreover, there was a small pro-Chinese group led by Bo Gustafsson and Nils Holmberg, that left the party to form Communist Party of Sweden (Kommunistiska Förbundet Marxist-Leninisterna; KFML) at the time of the congress. The youth wing broke away, eventually forming Marxist-Leninistiska Kampförbundet (MLK).

Splits and factionalism on the Swedish left in the last century.

In 1968, VPK was the first Swedish party to publicly condemn the Soviet intervention in Czechoslovakia. The party organized a demonstration outside the Soviet embassy in Stockholm, which was addressed by Hermansson. This disapproval of Soviet aggression was exceptional among the Western communist parties. The party line on Czechoslovakia irritated the pro-Soviet minority.

In the municipal elections of 1968, the VPK received 3,8% of the votes, the party's worst electoral result in the post-war era. Lacking a functioning youth and student wing, the party was unable to capitalize on the international surge of youth radicalism.

At the onset of protests against the U.S. war in Vietnam, the VPK launched the Swedish Vietnam Committee. The Committee demanded 'Peace in Vietnam' and appealed for all-party unity on the issue. The committee was rapidly out-manoeuvered by the United NLF Groups (DFFG), an organization led by the KFML that was actively supporting the armed struggle of the National Liberation Front of South Vietnam. Soon, the VPK left the Swedish Vietnam Committee and many members became active in the DFFG.

=== 1970s ===
In 1970, the youth wing was refounded as Kommunistisk Ungdom (pronounced [kɔmɵˈnɪ̌sːtɪsk ˈɵ̂ŋdʊm]; KU).

In 1972, the party shifted towards a more leftist position with the adaptation of a new programme. The neo-Leninist tendency emerged as an important section of the party.

In 1975, Lars Werner was elected party chairman. The runner-up candidate was Rolf Hagel of the pro-Soviet group. Werner was elected with 162 votes at the party congress. Hagel got 74 votes.

In February 1977, the pro-Soviet minority left the party, and founded the Workers' Party – Communists (APK). The founders of the APK took with them the newspaper Norrskensflamman and two MPs (Hagel and Alf Löwenborg). Between 1,500 and 2,000 VPK members joined the APK. (Note: Intelligence reports reveals that the pro-Soviet minority had direct consultations with the embassies of the Soviet Union and East Germany prior to the split. However, it appears that both the Communist Party of the Soviet Union and the Socialist Unity Party of Germany had urged the group to preserve the unity of VPK. SOU 2002:93 Archived 2006-09-28 at the Wayback Machine, p. 247–251.)

=== 1980s ===
In 1980, the VPK was active in the "No"-campaign in the referendum on nuclear power.

=== 1990s ===
In 1990, the VPK changed its name to Vänsterpartiet ((v), Left Party) and ceased to be a communist party.

In 1993, Werner resigned. Gudrun Schyman was elected party chairman.

In the 1994 parliamentary elections, the party received 6.2% of the vote. The prolonged electoral crisis of the party thus ended. The party's influence started to grow, especially amongst the youth. In the same year, the party was active in the "No"-campaign in the referendum on joining the European Union.

Having passed through a period of severe crisis, the party began to regain public support during the mid-1990s. In retrospect, the main factor behind this shift was not the party itself, but the fact that the Social Democrats had moved considerably towards the right in the preceding years, which had alienated much of its traditional voter base.

At the 1996 party congress, the Left Party declared itself to be feminist.

In 1998, the party obtained its best-ever result in a parliamentary election, winning 12% of the votes nationwide. Following the elections, the party entered into an arrangement with the social democrats, and started to support the government from outside.

=== 2000s ===
In the 2002 Swedish general election, the voteshare of the party dropped by 3% to a total of 8.3%. Simultaneously, the Social Democrats regained 3%.

In 2003, Schyman resigned following tax irregularities. Ulla Hoffmann took over as interim leader.

The 2004 party congress elected Lars Ohly as the new party chairman. At the end of the year, Schyman left the party, becoming a parliamentary independent. Lars Ohly initially called himself a communist, but later retracted that statement.

In the same year, a two-part documentary on the party was broadcast on the SVT show Uppdrag Granskning. The documentary focused mainly on the international relations of the party during the post-war era. Following the broadcast, debate surged once again concerning the relations of the party with the ruling parties in the former Socialist Bloc. (Note: The documentary was made by Janne Josefsson. The background material of the documentary consisted mainly of VPK publications. The new information presented in the documentary consisted partly of anecdotes of Werner's informal relations to the GDR embassy and an individual party member's meetings with the GDR embassy and the Communist Party of Czechoslovakia during the 1970s. Nevertheless, the documentary had a significant impact on the public debate.)

The Left Democrats (Vänsterdemokraterna) party was formed on 28 March 2004, when the local branch of the Left Party in Gnesta voted to leave the mother party. Between 2004 and 2006, the party held the two seats in the Gnesta municipal assembly. The Left Democrats was later, at a meeting in Stockholm on 29 January 2006, constituted as a nationwide party with ambitions of contesting the 2006 parliamentary elections. In the 2006 election, the party gained 12 votes. In 2007 the party was reconstituted as an association and was later dissolved.

In the September 2006 election, the Left Party won 317,228 votes (5.8%; compared to 8.4% in 2002), and therefore 22 Riksdag seats (previously 30). In the 2010 election, the party got 5.6% of the vote (334,053 votes) and 19 seats.

On 7 December 2008, the Social Democrats launched a political and electoral alliance known as the Red-Greens, together with the Left Party and the Green Party.

=== 2010s ===
The parties contested the 2010 general election on a joint manifesto, but lost to the incumbent centre-right coalition The Alliance. On 26 November 2010, the Red-Green alliance was dissolved.

On 6 January 2012, after Ohly had announced his resignation, the Left Party congress elected Jonas Sjöstedt as the new party chairman.

=== 2020s ===
On 31 October 2020, the party elected Nooshi Dadgostar as party leader, following the retirement of Sjöstedt.

On 15 June 2021, the party withdrew its support for the coalition government, after a disagreement on rent controls.

== Ideology and policies ==
=== Labour policy ===
The party opposes further liberalization of the Employment Protection Act, and vowed to initiate a vote of no confidence against the Löfven II Cabinet if they were to attempt such a liberalization. The Left Party is the only party in the Swedish parliament to advocate for a 30-hour work week.

=== Feminism ===
The Left Party claims that Sweden does not have social equality in regard to gender. The party thus advocates the creation of a specific Minister of Social Equality, as well as to introduce the teaching of "feminist self-defence" in high schools. Feminism as a concept was introduced in the party program in 1997, but it believes that it has always worked to strengthen women's rights. Feminist theory has grown into the party since the 1960s, when the women's movement gained a theoretical basis beyond Marxism. The Left Party opposes prostitution, and supports the ban on purchasing sex.

=== LGBT policy ===
The party supports equality for the LGBT community in ''matrimonial law, inheritance law, and family law''. The party also sees its feminism as linked to its pro-LGBT stance.

=== Immigration ===
The party supports a generous immigration policy, granting refugees permanent residency, and prioritizing family re-unification.

=== Foreign policy ===
In regards to the Israeli–Palestinian conflict, the party supports a two-state solution based on the 1967 border. The party calls for the freezing of EU trade agreements with Israel, ending Swedish military co-operation and arms trade with Israel, and a general consumer boycott of Israeli goods to put pressure on Israel. The party became the second largest in Malmö and Gothenburg in the 2024 EU election due to its strong support for Palestine, which attracted many voters of Middle Eastern descent. In the 2026 general election, the party's strong support for Palestine, general foreign policy stance, and opposition to Islamophobia attracted voters previously aligned with the Social Democrats and Muslim Nuance Party, particularly in Malmö where the party saw a significant surge in support in areas such as Rosengård gaining 41% of the electorate.

In 2024, the party dropped a long-held policy that Sweden should leave the European Union. The party opposed NATO membership in 2022, with party leader Nooshi Dadgostar stating that it would not help the situation in Ukraine and only further exacerbate tensions in the Baltic.

=== Republicanism ===
The Left Party advocates for the abolition of the Swedish monarchy, instead favoring republicanism.

=== Splits ===
During its history, there have been several splits of various significance:

- 1919: A group opposed to joining the Comintern left the party.
- 1921: A group refusing to go along with the name-change to SKP was expelled. They formed their own party, called SSV.
- 1924: Zeth Höglund split, and formed his own SKP.
- 1929: Leader Karl Kilbom and the majority of the party were expelled by the Comintern. Kilbom formed a parallel SKP.
- 1956: Set Persson formed the Communist Labour League of Sweden.
- 1967: Pro-China elements formed the KFML.
- 1977: Pro-Moscow wing broke away, formed Workers Party - Communists
- 2004: Party chair Gudrun Schyman split from the party, and formed the Feminist Initiative.
- 2013: Local chair of the Young left in Örebro Markus Allard and surrounding faction expelled in December of 2013. Later, during the spring 2014, formed the Örebro Party.
- 2025: Members of Parliament Lorena Delgado Varas and Daniel Riazat were expelled from the party in August 2025, and founded Future Left in December of that year.

== Controversies ==
=== Antisemitism ===
Following the 7 October 2023 Hamas-led attack on Israel, several Left Party representatives and candidates were accused of antisemitism, support for designated terrorist organisations, or related statements. Investigations by Swedish newspapers, including Sydsvenskan, Helsingborgs Dagblad and Expressen, documented online posts by local politicians.

In summer 2024, Orwa Kadoura, then deputy chairman of the Left Party in Malmö, was reported to have shared content including a video praising the 7 October attacks and an image depicting Israeli Prime Minister Benjamin Netanyahu with a devil's tail drinking blood, which the Swedish Committee Against Antisemitism characterised as invoking antisemitic tropes. Kadoura left the party in September 2024.

Around the same period, Ali Hadrous, a municipal councillor in Landskrona and local party board member, was found to have shared posts asserting Jewish control of news media and the United States, comparing Israeli soldiers to "Hitler's heirs", and promoting conspiracy theories about the 7 October attacks. The party suspended him and initiated expulsion proceedings; he later left the party.

Kristofer Lundberg, chairman of the party association in Angered, Gothenburg, faced scrutiny for expressing support for the Popular Front for the Liberation of Palestine (PFLP), an organisation designated as terrorist by the European Union. He was later expelled.

In April 2025, Member of Parliament Lorena Delgado Varas shared an image on social media that the Official Council of Swedish Jewish Communities (Judiska Centralrådet) described as antisemitic. The Council filed a police report for incitement against an ethnic group. Prosecutors did not open a full investigation, citing lack of proven intent, but the party removed Varas from its parliamentary group while allowing her to remain a member. The decision prompted internal protests, including a petition signed by hundreds of members and some local associations, and led MP Daniel Riazat to resign from the party board.

In October 2024, the Official Council of Swedish Jewish Communities announced it would no longer invite the Left Party to its memorial ceremonies, stating that problems with antisemitism within the party were not limited to isolated individuals and that the leadership’s response had been insufficient. Party leader Nooshi Dadgostar invited the Council to talks; a meeting occurred later that month, but the invitation ban remained in place.

Ahead of the 2026 elections, Expressen investigations identified multiple candidates who had shared antisemitic conspiracy theories, celebrated the 7 October attacks, denied or downplayed aspects of the Holocaust, or expressed support for Hamas or authoritarian leaders. The party removed at least 25 candidates from its lists in mid-2026 and a further eight in September 2026, bringing the reported total of removals related to such issues to around 33 according to contemporary reporting. Party leaders stated that the individuals were incompatible with party values and that the candidates had been removed.

In the lead-up to the 2026 Swedish general election, investigations by Expressen documented that multiple Left Party candidates for municipal, regional and parliamentary lists had shared social media content containing claims that Adolf Hitler was "right" about the Jews, and classic antisemitic conspiracy theories such as blood libel (Jews sacrificing white children for ritual purposes or food production) and assertions of Jewish control over the world economy, media and academia.

The party stated that antisemitism has no place within it and organised internal education courses on recognising and countering antisemitism for members. Former party leader Jonas Sjöstedt said in 2024 that the party could do more to address the issue.

== Election results ==
=== Riksdag ===
Percentage of votes by year:

1973

1976

1979

1982

1985

1988

1991

1994

1998

2002

2006

2010

2014

2018

2022

2026

Election	Leader	Votes	%	Seats	+/–	Status
1917	Zeth Höglund	59,243	8.05 (#4)	11 / 230	▲11	Opposition
1920	Zeth Höglund	42,056	6.39 (#5)	7 / 230	▼4	Opposition
1921	Ivar Vennerström	80,355	4.61 (#5)	7 / 230	Steady	Opposition
1924	Nils Flyg	63,301	3.60 (#6)	4 / 230	▼3	Opposition
1928	Nils Flyg	151,567	6.43 (#5)	8 / 230	▲4	Opposition
1932	Sven Linderot	74,245	2.98 (#6)	2 / 230	▼6	External support
1936	Sven Linderot	96,519	3.31 (#6)	5 / 230	▲3	External support
1940	Sven Linderot	101,424	3.53 (#5)	3 / 230	▼2	External support
1944	Sven Linderot	318,466	10.32 (#5)	15 / 230	▲12	External support
1948	Sven Linderot	244,826	6.31 (#5)	8 / 230	▼7	External support
1952	Hilding Hagberg	164,194	4.34 (#5)	6 / 230	▼3	External support
1956	Hilding Hagberg	194,016	5.00 (#5)	6 / 231	▲1	Opposition
1958	Hilding Hagberg	129,319	3.36 (#5)	5 / 231	▼1	External support
1960	Hilding Hagberg	190,560	4.48 (#5)	5 / 232	Steady	External support
1964	C.-H. Hermansson	221,746	5.22 (#5)	8 / 233	▲3	External support
1968	C.-H. Hermansson	145,172	3.01 (#5)	3 / 233	▼5	External support
1970	C.-H. Hermansson	236,659	4.76 (#5)	17 / 350	▲14	External support
1973	C.-H. Hermansson	274,929	5.33 (#5)	19 / 350	▲2	External support
1976	Lars Werner	258,432	4.75 (#5)	17 / 349	▼2	Opposition
1979	Lars Werner	305,420	5.61 (#5)	20 / 349	▲3	Opposition
1982	Lars Werner	308,899	5.56 (#5)	20 / 349	Steady	External support
1985	Lars Werner	298,419	5.36 (#5)	19 / 349	▼1	External support
1988	Lars Werner	314,031	5.84 (#5)	21 / 349	▲2	External support
1991	Lars Werner	246,905	4.51 (#7)	16 / 349	▼5	Opposition
1994	Gudrun Schyman	342,988	6.17 (#5)	22 / 349	▲6	External support
1998	Gudrun Schyman	631,011	12.00 (#3)	43 / 349	▲21	External support
2002	Gudrun Schyman	444,854	8.39 (#5)	30 / 349	▼13	External support
2006	Lars Ohly	324,722	5.85 (#6)	22 / 349	▼8	Opposition
2010	Lars Ohly	334,053	5.60 (#7)	19 / 349	▼3	Opposition
2014	Jonas Sjöstedt	356,331	5.72 (#6)	21 / 349	▲2	External support
2018	Jonas Sjöstedt	518,454	8.00 (#5)	28 / 349	▲7	External support
2022	Nooshi Dadgostar	437,050	6.75 (#4)	24 / 349	▼4	Opposition
2026	Nooshi Dadgostar	568,781	8.40 (#4)	30 / 349	▲6	

=== European Parliament ===
Election	List leader	Votes	%	Seats	+/–	EP Group
1995	Jonas Sjöstedt	346,764	12.92 (#4)	3 / 22	New	GUE/NGL
1999	Jonas Sjöstedt	400,073	15.82 (#3)	3 / 22	Steady	GUE/NGL
2004	Jonas Sjöstedt	321,344	12.79 (#4)	2 / 19	▼1	GUE/NGL
2009	Eva-Britt Svensson	179,222	5.66 (#6)	1 / 18	▼1	GUE/NGL
2014	Malin Björk	234,272	6.30 (#7)	1 / 20	Steady	GUE/NGL
2019	Malin Björk	282,300	6.80 (#7)	1 / 20	Steady	GUE/NGL
2024	Jonas Sjöstedt	464,166	11.06 (#5)	2 / 21	▲1	GUE/NGL

== Party leaders ==
- Carl Winberg, 1917
- Zeth Höglund, 1917
- Ernst Åström, 1918
- Karl Kilbom, 1918
- Zeth Höglund, 1919–1924
- Karl Kilbom, 1921–1923
- Nils Flyg, 1924–1929
- Sven Linderot, 1929–1951
- Hilding Hagberg, 1951–1964
- C.-H. Hermansson, 1964–1975
- Lars Werner, 1975–1993
- Gudrun Schyman, 1993–2003
- Ulla Hoffmann (acting), 2003–2004
- Lars Ohly, 2004–2012
- Jonas Sjöstedt, 2012–2020
- Nooshi Dadgostar, 2020–

== Publications ==
- Blekinge Folkblad (1943–1957)
- Bohustidningen (1946–1948)
- Borås Folkblad (1943–1957)
- Dalarnes Folkblad (1917–1925)
- Dalarnes Folkblad (1940–1956)
- Folkviljan (1942–1957)
- Folkviljan (1980–1989)
- Gästriklands Folkblad (1921–1922)
- Hälsingekuriren (1919–1923)
- Kalmar Läns–Kuriren (1923–1942)
- Norra Småland (1918–1923)
- Norrlandskuriren (1922)
- Norrskensflamman (1906–1977)
- Piteåbygden (1920)
- Röda Röster (1919–1930)
- Skånes Folkblad (1918–1922)
- Smålandsfolket (1940)
- Örebro Läns Arbetartidning (1940–1956)
- Örebro Läns Folkblad (1919–1920)
- Övre Dalarnes Tidning (1917–1920)

== See also ==
- Arbetarnas bildningsförbund
- C. N. Carleson
- Democratic Farmers League of Sweden
- Farm Workers Union of Småland
- List of political parties in Sweden
- Östergötlands Arbetartidning
- Referendums in Sweden
- Young Left
- The Left in the Church of Sweden
