= Set Persson =

Swedish Communist Leader

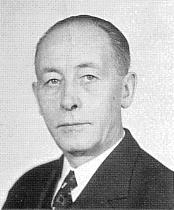
Set Persson

Set Persson (5 March 1897 – 15 July 1960) was a Swedish communist leader.

Persson was born on 5 March 1897 in Stockholm, but as an orphan he was raised by relatives in Hälsingland. He was a good student in school, but left his studies at the age of 14 to start to work in the railroads. Soon he joined the Social Democratic Youth League. Furtheron, the joined the Communist Party of Sweden, which had been founded by the youth league in 1917.

Following the Ådalen massacre in 1931, Persson led a 10-day general strike in Söderhamn during which clashes with the police erupted. The following year he was, together with Anders Bäckström (leader of the 1931 Marma workers strike), the main speaker at a workers rally in Sandarne against strike breakers. After the speeches were concluded, the workers marched towards the dock area. Suddenly the rally was attacked from behind by police, using sables and smoke-bombs. Violence erupted, and three demonstrators were wounded by police bullets. Persson was arrested and charged for having taken part in organizing the rally, and sentenced to four months of involuntary labour. In total 73 months of imprisonment was awarded to different rallyists. One worker, named Zetterström, was sentenced to two and half year in jail. Moreover, Persson was fired from the railroads and lost his pension rights. Twice the government offered to pardon him, but he declined.

Following his release, Persson became a party whole-timer. In 1934 he moved to Stockholm, and was inducted into the central party leadership. He worked closely with the party chairman Sven Linderot. He served as editor for local and trade union matters for the party publication Ny Dag.

In 1940 he was elected to the Riksdag (the Swedish parliament). During the war years, he protested against the government policy of internment of communists into working camps (which were officially military units to which the communists were drafted, but in practice prison camps).

In the 1946 municipal elections, in which the party got 11.2% of the nationwide vote, Persson was elected to the Stockholm municipal council. He left the parliament to become the first communist borgarråd, with responsibility for housing. In 1947 he set up a municipal housing distribution scheme. He promoted building of municipal housing estates to solve the lack of apartments in the city. In many ways, he was a pioneer in Swedish housing policy.

Through his position in the municipal government he also became, for a brief period, the chairman of the police committee of the city. In 1948 he declared publicly that the Stockholm police would not follow the central anticommunist guidelines when recruiting new policemen.

He lost his position as borgarråd after the 1950 elections.

Persson became identified with the leftist minority within the party. Several issues were at stake in the internal party debate, especially concerning the relationship to the governing Social Democrats. After the conclusion of the Second World War, the idea that a peaceful transition to socialism was possible gained ground in the international communist movement. In Sweden the origin of the concept may be traced back to 1944. There was a growing trend in the Communist Party of Sweden to seek to create alliances with the Social Democrats and to give more emphasis to the parliamentary struggle. Linderot had launched the idea of a 'united front' with the Social Democrats, and argued that it had been a mistake to perceive the Social Democrats as identical to the state power. The party adopted a new trade union policy, which was less conflictive than the previous line. Persson and Nils Holmberg formed the nucleus of critics of the new development.

In the 1952 parliamentary by-elections in Jämtland and Kristianstad, the party had decided to withdraw their lists, in order to enable that Social Democrats would not lose the elections. The party leadership argued that communists had to make an effort to "ensure a labour majority in the Riksdag". Moreover, the two concerned counties were electoral districts where it was highly unlikely that any communist MP would be elected. However, Persson and the people around him saw the new line as a capitulation to the Social Democrats.

Another issue concerned the youth league. The party took an initiative to create a broad-based youth movement, looking at similar developments in countries like Finland. In 1952, Democratic Youth (Demokratisk Ungdom) was founded as a broad youth movement, parallel to the existing Young Communist League of Sweden. Persson and his associates saw this as diluting of the political character of the youth movement.

An issue of high symbolic importance was the decision of the party to promote joint May Day rallies with the Social Democrats. Yet another issue was the decision of the party to give financial support to the "labour press", which was essentially in the hands of the Social Democrats.

The polemic reached its peak at the 1953 party congress. Persson fiercely exposed his criticism, particularly towards the new party chairman Hilding Hagberg, whom he branded as an opportunist. Persson was in turn accused of being an egoist who wanted to divide and damage the party. Criticism was delivered towards Persson by Knut Senander and even former brother-in-arms Holmberg, who said that Persson had to be held accountable for lack of political orientation and anti-party actions. Both Senander and Holmberg were considered as being part of the leftist section of the party, but at this occasion their appeared as the most firebrand defenders of the party line. Only a handful of delegates defended Persson, and those who did clearly highlighted that they did not fully share Persson's critique of the line of the party leadership. In a highly emotional conclusion of the debate, Persson declared his resignation from the party in a speech to the congress.

After leaving the party, Persson was subjected to a great deal of criticism from the party. This critique was printed in the party media. Persson himself, however, initially kept his promise not to give any comment on his departure from the party to the non-communist press. In January 1954 the party accused him of having contacted the Social Democratic press. Several other accusations were levelled against himself, especially the fact that he lived on his borgarråd-pension. After these accusations, Persson spoke out openly about the proceedings of the 1953 congress.

Simultaneously, a campaign of purges were conducted inside the party. Individuals found to be sympathizers of Persson were expelled. Persson rallied his supporters into secret 'marxist circles', were some of the participants were still party members. In 1956 he launched a new party, the Communist Labour League of Sweden (Sveriges Kommunistiska Arbetarförbund). The new party published Revolt. SKA did not, however, attain any real importance. At most it had around 100 members.

Although Persson in the 1950s had emerged as the leader of the most hardline faction within the communist movement he was, paradoxally, amongst the first to publicly criticize the human rights situation in the Socialist Bloc.

Set Persson died on 15 July 1960. SKA withered away after his death. When the Marxist-Leninist Struggle League (MLK) emerged inte 1970s, they named their bookstores after Persson. Set Persson bookstores were set up in Stockholm, Gothenburg, Trollhättan, Sundsvall and Kiruna. Another group which would claim to represent the legacy of Set Persson was the Communist Party in Sweden (KPS).
