= SDJ =

SDJ may mean:

- Democratic Farmers League of Sweden (Swedish: Sverges demokratiska jordbrukareförbund)
- Sendai Airport, Natori, Miyagi, Japan
- Seven Day Jesus, a Christian rock band
- School District of Janesville, Janesville, Wisconsin, United States
- Suundi language, a Bantu language
- Sammy Davis Jr., American singer and entertainer

SdJ may mean:

- Spiel des Jahres, an annual board game design prize
