= Ny Dag =

Newspaper published in Sweden (1930–1990)

Ny Dag ("New Day") was a Swedish communist newspaper and the main publication of the Communist Party of Sweden (later renamed 'Left Party – Communists') from 2 January 1930 to 5 August 1990, when publication stopped.

Ny Dag was started in 1930 by the branch of the Communist Party that had selected to remain faithful to Comintern in the big party split of 1929, in order to replace Folkets Dagblad Politiken, which had been the party's main publication since 1917, but had selected to join the "Kilbom rebels" in the 1929 split.

Ny Dag was one of six newspapers that was subject to a transport ban during the Second World War. The transport ban, based on a law in place between 1940 and 1944, meant amongst other things that the newspaper could not be transported through the postal services, railways or other forms of public transport. In early 1942 one of its issues was banned since it covered a comment on the publication of a document by the Polish government in the anti-Nazi newspaper Trots allt!.

In 1945, Ny Dag had around 29,700 subscribers. About ten local editions of Ny Dag were launched during the 1940s. All were closed down during the 1950s.

After the meagre election result for the Communist Party in the 1962 municipal elections (in which the party obtained 3.8% of the nationwide vote), a lengthy, and for a Communist Party publication remarkably harsh, debate erupted in the pages of Ny Dag, in which critics held the party leadership personally accountable for the electoral defeat.

Ny Dag became a twice-weekly newspaper in 1965. In 1970, it had a circulation of around 15,000. Ny Dag was printed at Västermalms Tryckeri AB, on Kungsholmen in Stockholm.

== Editors ==
Hugo Sillén edited Ny Dag between 1931 and 1934. Around 1940, Gustav Johansson was the editor of the newspaper.

Hilding Hagberg, also the party chairman, was the political editor of Ny Dag 1943 to 1964, whilst C.-H. Hermansson served as the editor of the newspaper 1959 to 1964. In the late 1970s, Ingemar Andersson was editor-in-chief of the newspaper.
