= The Einstein Girl =

2009 novel by Philip Sington

- First edition
- Author: Philip Sington
- Language: English
- Genre: Novel
- Publisher: Harvill Secker
- Publication date: August 2009
- Publication place: UK
- Media type: Paperback
- Pages: 400
- ISBN: 1-84655-290-7

The Einstein Girl (2009) is a novel written by Philip Sington.

== Plot summary ==
A psychiatrist named Martin Kirsch travels across Germany, Switzerland and Serbia in search of an amnesiac woman's identity, whom she is almost dying outside Berlin in the roast-chestnut smell of Grenadierstrasse, a soggy handbill detailing one of Albert Einstein’s public lectures.
