= Den Nya Politiken =

Swedish communist newspaper

Den Nya Politiken ("The New Politics") was a communist daily newspaper published in Stockholm, Sweden from August 1924 to November 1925. Zeth Höglund was the editor of the paper. The paper functioned as the organ of the dissident Communist Party of Sweden led by Höglund.
