= Zoia Korvin-Krukovsky =

Russian-Swedish artist

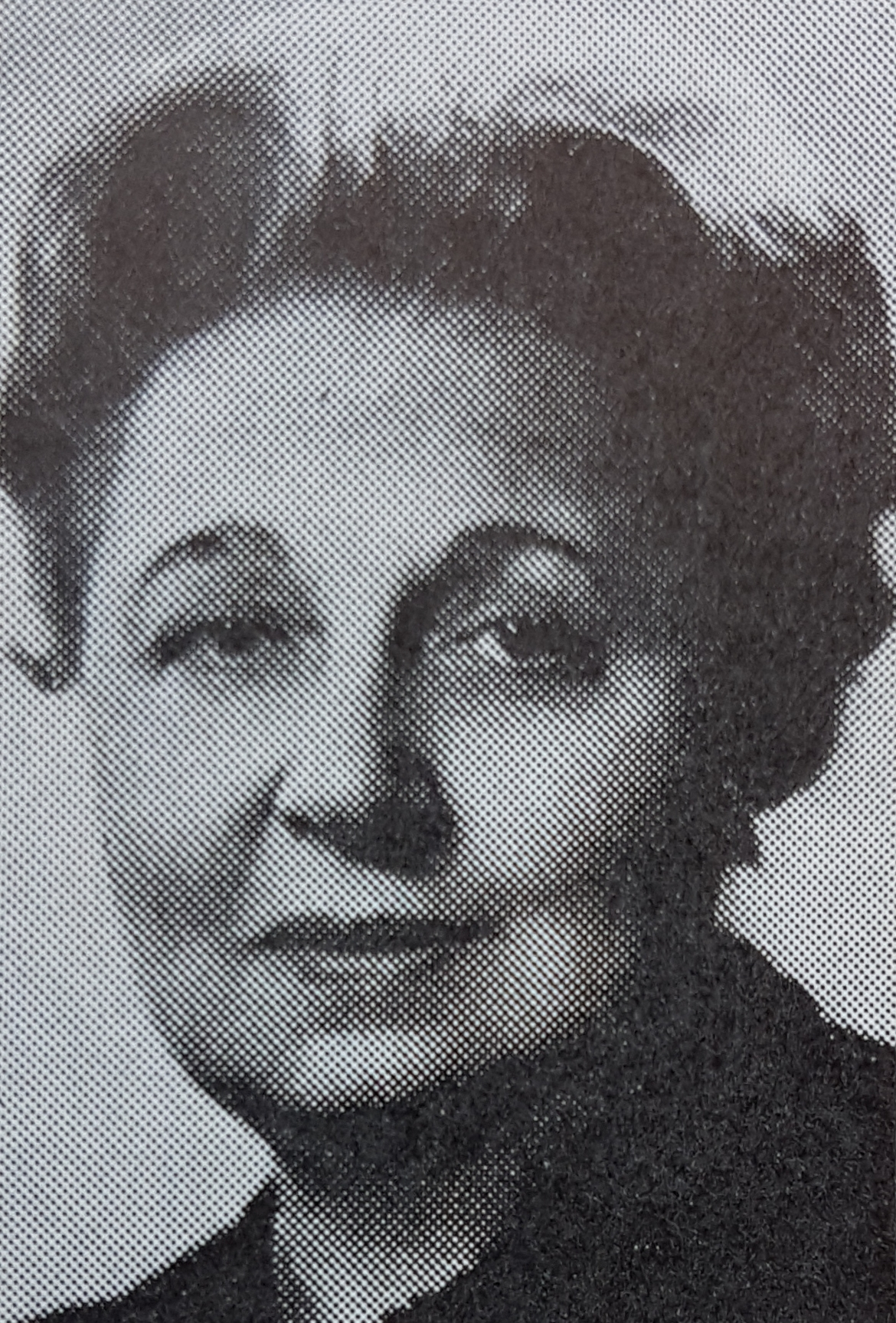
Zoia21.

Zoia Korvin-Krukovsky (18 January 1903 - 22 November 1999), also known as Zoia Krukovskaya Lagerkrans, was a Russian-Swedish artist known for landscapes and portraits painted against a gold background. She signed her paintings simply Zoia.

== Life ==
She was born Zoia Korvin-Krukovsky in St. Petersburg, Russia, the daughter of Colonel Krukovsky and Héléne Inkina. She was educated at the Smolny Institute. After the Russian Revolution, the family moved to Moscow, where she studied at the Moscow Academy of Art with Wassily Kandinsky. She also studied in Paris for five years (1925–30), both at the Académie de la Grande Chaumière and privately with Fernand Léger and Tsuguharu Foujita.

In 1921, Zoia met the Swedish communist politician Karl Kilbom when he was part of a delegation at the Profintern congress held in Moscow. Zoia was serving as an interpreter, but during the congress she was arrested as a suspect in a counterrevolutionary conspiracy. Kilbom helped to get Zoia released, and in 1922 she married him and moved to Sweden. They later divorced, and in 1938 she married the Swedish architect Gunnar Lagerkrans. She died in Stockholm.

== Art ==
Zoia's distinctive style draws on 13th century Italian religious art, East Asian art, Dutch flower painting, and Russian icons. Her best-known works are urban landscapes and figurative paintings, often executed on a gold background.

Her first solo exhibition was at the Galerie Bernheim-Jeune in Paris in 1929 and included only portraits. Among those she painted were Iranian empress Farah Pahlavi, King Hassan of Morocco, Queen Silvia of Sweden, and Soviet leader Leonid Brezhnev.

Her work is in the collection of several museums, including the Swedish National Museum and the Swedish Museum of Modern Art.

In 2006, the English novelist Philip Sington published Zoia's Gold, a novel loosely based on the events of her life.
