= Communist Labour League of Sweden =

- Founded: 1956
- Dissolved: 1967
- Newspaper: Revolt
- Ideology: Communism; Marxism-Leninism; Stalinism; Anti-revisionism

The Sveriges Kommunistiska Arbetarförbund (SKA; English: Communist Labour League of Sweden) was formed in 1956 by a group of Stalinist hardliners who left or were expelled from the Left Party of Sweden (SKP) during the 1950s. This group had earlier formed "Marxist circles", in which some SKP militants participated secretly. The group was headed by Set Persson, a communist from Stockholm who had left SKP at the party congress in 1953.

The group was founded in 1956.

SKA started publishing the magazine Revolt. In its pages SKA defended Joseph Stalin and criticized the new Soviet regime under Nikita Khrushchev. They criticized SKP for what they considered as "populism". The group also expressed some criticism over the human rights situation within the Eastern Bloc.

In 1958, SKA tried to launch their own list of candidates for the municipal elections in Stockholm but failed to get any seats. Persson died in 1960.

In 1965, Dagens Nyheter estimated it to have around a hundred members.

The group existed until 1967. SKA never played any role in Swedish politics. However, the organizational experiences of the people who were active in SKA became important for the later generation of leftists, such as the KFML.
