= Lars Werner =

Swedish politician (1935–2013)

Lars Werner SKP
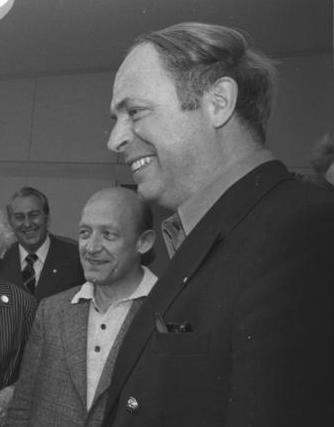
- Lars Werner during a July 1974 visit to East Berlin

Leader of the Left Party Communists
- In office 13 March 1975 – 7 January 1993
- Preceded by: C.-H. Hermansson
- Succeeded by: Gudrun Schyman

Member of the Swedish Parliament for Stockholm Municipality
- In office 1965–1994

Personal details
- Born: 25 July 1935 Stockholm, Sweden
- Died: 11 January 2013 (aged 77) Tyresö, Sweden
- Party: Left Party – the Communists
- Profession: Construction worker

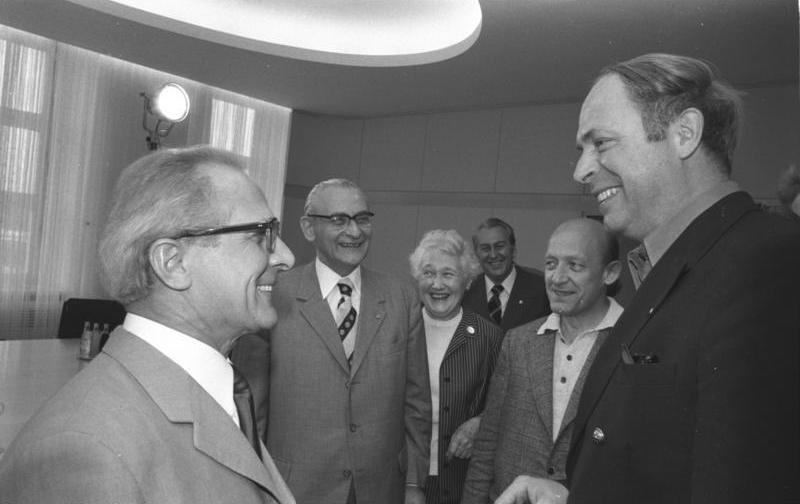
Lars Werner (right) with Erich Honecker, 1974

Lars Helge Werner (25 July 1935 – 11 January 2013) was a Swedish socialist politician.

Werner was born in Stockholm. He was a member of the Riksdag from 1965 to 1994. A construction worker by profession, he was elected vice chairman of Vänsterpartiet kommunisterna (VPK) ("the Left Party – the Communists") in 1967, and became party chairman in 1975. During his time as party leader, he worked to distance the party from the Soviet Union, a process that had been started by his predecessor as party leader, C.-H. Hermansson. In 1990, VPK changed its name to Vänsterpartiet ("the Left Party"), removing the term "Communists". Werner resigned as party leader in 1993, and was succeeded by Gudrun Schyman.

Werner died from a heart condition in 2013, at the age of 77.

Preceded by C.-H. Hermansson	Leader of the Swedish Left Party - Communists; 1975—1993	Succeeded by Gudrun Schyman
