= Philip Sington =

English novelist and playwright

Philip Sington is an English novelist and playwright. He was born in Cambridge, UK.

He read history at Trinity College, Cambridge. Together with the mystery writer Gary Humphreys, he has co-authored six thrillers under the joint pseudonym of Patrick Lynch. Their third book, Carriers (1995), was adapted as a TV movie of the same name in 1998. They also collaborated on the stage play Lip Service, which was premiered at the Finborough Theatre in London in 2000.

His first solo novel, Zoia's Gold, was published in November 2006 by Simon & Schuster. It was based in part on the life of the Russian-Swedish artist Zoia Korvin-Krukovsky.

The Einstein Girl, his second solo novel, was published in August 2009 by Harvill Secker, part of Random House. His third solo novel, The Valley of Unknowing, was published in 2012, also by Harvill Secker.

He lives in London.
