= Workers' Youth League (Sweden) =

Swedish communist youth organisation

The Workers' Youth League (Arbetarnas Ungdomsförbund, abbreviated AUF) was the youth organization of the Communist Party of Sweden. It was active during 1924–1926.

AUF published the magazine Arbetets Ungdom (Youth of Labour) beginning in 1925.
