= Nils Holmberg =

Swedish communist (1902–1981)

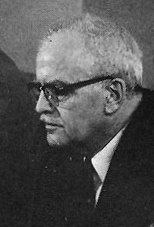
Nils Gösta Holmberg in 1967

Nils Gösta Holmberg (23 December 1902 – 4 August 1981) was a communist leader in Sweden. He was born on 23 December 1902 in Stockholm. Holmberg was a member of the Young Communist League of Sweden (SKU) from 1926 to 1929. He was a member of the executive committee of SKU. Later on, he became a leading member of the mother party, the Communist Party of Sweden (SKP). In 1933 he was inducted into the Central Committee of the party, a position he held until 1956.

From 1933 to 1958 he was a member of the board of the Communist Arbetarkommun of Gothenburg and a member of the municipal council of the city from 1935 to 1944. He was also the editor of the daily newspaper of the party in Gothenburg, Arbetar-Tidningen. During the Second World War the government imposed a ban on transporting the publication. The newspaper was confiscated 34 times by the police, and thrice did the confiscations lead to charges against it. Twice did the court sentence the responsible publisher to imprisonment. However, Holmberg was not jailed as the newspaper had officially registered an individual party member as the publisher of the newspaper.

During the war Holmberg publicly criticized, in his function as a municipal councilor, the government policy of putting communists into camps (officially these camps were military units to which the communists were drafted, but practice they were prison camps). Holmberg called them 'concentration camps', and highlighted the fact that the government simultaneously had several Nazis as military officers.

In 1944 Holmberg was elected to the Riksdag (the Swedish parliament). In 1946, following the municipal elections in which SKP had won 11.2% of the nationwide vote, Holmberg left the Riksdag to return to municipal politics in Gothenburg. With the SKP strengthened Holmberg became the vice chairman of the municipal council. He would represent the party in the council up to 1958.

During the period after the Second World War, the party shifted its policy and started favouring more alliances with the Social Democrats. Holmberg, together with fellow Gothenburg party cadre Knut Senander, now formed part of the leftist minority opposed to this development. The opposition to the party leadership was led by Set Persson from Stockholm. However, at the time of the 1953 party congress, Holmberg and Senander were back in the party fold and fiercely denounced Persson as an egoist and saboteur.

He was a member of the Sweden China Association. At the time of the Sino-Soviet split, Holmberg became a leading figure of the small pro-Chinese wing, here the group around him in Gothenburg formed a vital part. In some ways the grouping around Holmberg found common ground with the reformist anti-Soviet elements in the party, albeit only on a superficial level.

In 1967 Holmberg took part in a split away from SKP. His group and a somewhat larger faction (in relative terms) of young party members and sympathizers launched a new organization, the Communist League Marxist-Leninists (KFML). Holmberg became a member of the Central Committee of KFML. He was appoint Secretary of Studies in the Central Committee. Holmberg had an important role in the organization, being the only member with roots in the traditional communist leadership. He held his position in the Central Committee until 1973.

In the late 1950s Holmberg was hired by the Chinese authorities to translate the propaganda magazine China Pictorial into Swedish. Following his return to Sweden he translated the 'Great Polemic' and texts of Mao Zedong into Swedish. Holmberg also published various literary and political works, like Per Stigmans äventyr, Till kamp för Sveriges kommunistiska parti, Fredlig kontrarevolution, Hur ungdomen arbetar samt varför den bör ansluta sig till Sveriges Kommunistiska Ungdomsförbund and Mot rådande vind: kommunistiska texter (edited by Robert Aschberg).
