= Gästriklands Folkblad =

Gästriklands Folkblad was a communist newspaper published thrice weekly in Sandviken, Sweden from July 1921 to August 1922. Karl Gustaf Ragnar Almgren was the editor of the paper.
