= Östergötlands Arbetartidning =

Swedish communist newspaper

Östergötlands Arbetartidning was a communist weekly newspaper published in Norrköping, Sweden from October 1945 to April 1957. It had a weekly edition of around 10,888 in 1945.
