= Hugo Sillén =

Swedish Communist politician

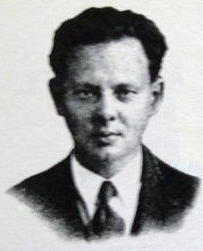
- Hugo Sillén

Member of Stockholm City Council
- In office 1947–1950

Personal details
- Born: December 18, 1892; Stockholm, Sweden
- Died: December 4, 1971 (aged 78); Stockholm, Sweden
- Political party: Communist Party of Sweden (1917–); Swedish Social Democratic Party (1913–1917)
- Spouse: Signe Jansson

Klas Hugo Sillén (18 December 1892, Stockholm – 4 December 1971) was a Swedish communist party politician. He first joined communism in 1917, becoming the secretary of the youth wing of the Communist Party, the Social Democratic Youth League, which he was secretary of until 1924. In the 1929 split of the Communist Party of Sweden, Sillén led the pro-Comintern fraction that expelled Karl Kilbom and the majority of the party members with support of the Comintern that feared Kilbom would support Bukharin's right opposition against Joseph Stalin. He was also editor-in-chief of the party organ, Ny Dag, from 1931 to 1934. Hugo Sillén became a devoted Stalinist.
