= Karl Kilbom =

Swedish politician (1885–1961)

Karl Kilbom S SP K
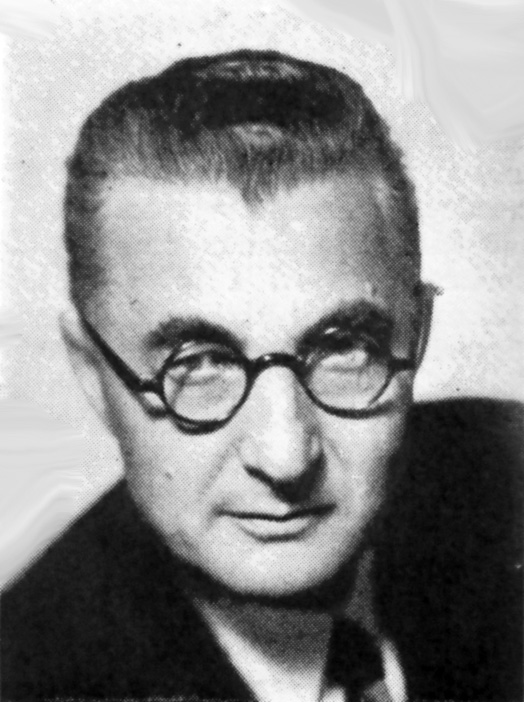
- Karl Kilbom c. 1937

Leader of the Communist Party
- In office 1921–1923 Serving with Nils Flyg
- Preceded by: Zeth Höglund
- Succeeded by: Sven Linderot

Member of the Riksdag's Second Chamber for Stockholm City
- In office 1922–1924
- Constituency: Stockholm City
- In office 1929–1944
- Constituency: Stockholm City

Personal details
- Born: 8 May 1885 Österbybruk, Films parish, Uppsala County, Sweden
- Died: 24 December 1961 (aged 76) Bromma Parish, Stockholm, Sweden
- Resting place: Bromma Church graveyard
- Party: Social Democratic Party (1938–1944)
- Other political affiliations: Communist Party (1917–1929); Socialist Party (1929–1937)
- Spouses: Zoia Korvin-Krukovsky (m. 1921; div. 1936) Märta Bengtsson (m. 1937–1961)
- Profession: Film director

Karl Kilbom (8 May 1885 – 24 December 1961) was a Swedish politician and one of the founders of the Communist Party of Sweden.

== Youth ==
The son of a blacksmith, Karl Kilbom grew up in a working class family of Walloon origin in the small town of Österbybruk outside Uppsala, where he started working in the steel mills at an early age.

In 1900, a socialist agitator visited Österbybruk to talk to the workers of the mills. Karl Kilbom, only 15 years old, was one of the 7 people who stayed after the meeting to participate in the formation of a socialist club in Österbybruk with the goal of establishing a union. However, company spies had been present at the meeting and soon Kilbom was told he would not only lose his job, but also that his family, who lived in a house owned by the company, would be evicted, if he didn't quit political activism. This time, Kilbom gave in to the threats.

== Becoming a Socialist ==
In 1903, Kilbom moved to Sandviken where he joined a socialist club. However, soon after he found a job on a ship named Thetis, embarking from Gävle shipping lumber from Sweden to England and other places. The conditions for the workers on the boat were wretched and the pay was low, but Kilbom saw this as a great opportunity to explore the world, although, according to his autobiography, he had severe problems with seasickness.

In 1905, Kilbom disembarked the Thetis in Gävle. Unemployed, he joined the Social Democratic youth organization in the city, and he was schooled by the prominent socialist Fabian Månsson to be an agitator. Kilbom soon moved to Krylbo and Avesta to work for the party there.

In 1907, Kilbom was conscripted to do military service in the Swedish Navy and he soon found himself on the navy base of Skeppsholmen in Stockholm, and stationed on the coastal defense ship HSwMS Svea. While in the navy, Kilbom got in trouble with the commanders for spreading, what they called, "illegal" Social Democratic papers with anti-militarist messages.

After military service, Kilbom moved to Gothenburg and started working at a plant manufacturing safes, and became a leader of the union there. He also became more and more active in the Swedish Social Democratic Party and started to study Marxism. He was asked by the party to go on national speaking tours to spread the word of socialism to the workers in every corner of Sweden, and for many years Kilbom was without a home, always on the road.

== Becoming a Communist ==
In 1910, Karl Kilbom moved to Halmstad to do work for the Social Democratic party there. Within the party, Kilbom sided with the Left Opposition led by Zeth Höglund against the reformist party leader Hjalmar Branting. In 1917 the party split in two and Kilbom joined its Left-leaning faction, the Social Democratic Left Party of Sweden, which supported the Bolsheviks in Russia. It soon evolved into the Communist Party of Sweden. Already in 1915, Karl Kilbom had been made one of the main Swedish contacts with the Russian Bolsheviks and worked closely with Nikolai Bukharin who lived in Sweden during the war.

In the spring of 1917, Kilbom was sent to Finland on behalf of the Swedish Left-Socialist to persuade the Finnish Social Democrats to turn left too, but he soon realized that the Finnish socialists were already further to the left than himself, and in less than a year Finland would experience its own workers revolution.

From Finland, Kilbom traveled to Petrograd together with his Finland-Swedish comrade Karl H. Wiik, and after some difficulties at the internal border, they arrived and were greeted by Alexandra Kollontay. In Petrograd Karl Kilbom was taken to see a debate between Alexander Kerensky and Vladimir Lenin in front of a huge crowd of workers and soldiers. Kilbom did not understand what the speakers said, but afterwards Kollontay told him Lenin had spoken about the importance of making peace with Germany, while Kerensky had been speaking of continuing the war. The same evening, Kilbom had a chance to talk to Lenin briefly. They had met once before in Stockholm, and the Bolshevik leader now told him that a new revolution, in which the communists would take power, was imminent, and that he hoped the Swedish comrades would be prepared for the same.

Back in Sweden, Kilbom started working for the newly launched Left Party paper Politiken.

== Revolutionary work ==
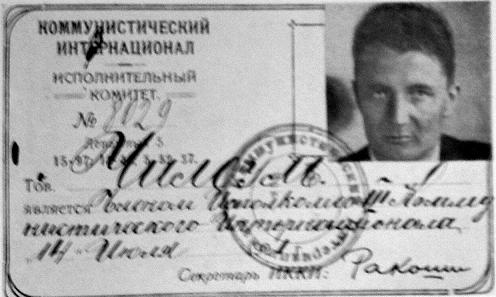
K. Kilbom - membership card of the Comintern

In December 1917, a month after the October Revolution, Kilbom, together with Zeth Höglund, went to Soviet Russia to spend the New Years and show their support for the Bolsheviks. At Smolny the Swedes met with their Finnish Comrades, who were very happy after the Bolshevik Government had given Finland independence from Russia.

In 1919, Kilbom was approached in Stockholm by the American diplomats William C. Bullitt and Lincoln Steffens, who asked him if he could help them get to Russia and into contact with the Bolshevik government. Kilbom took the Americans to meet Lenin in Moscow and he greeted them as they said they wanted establish diplomatic relations between the United States and Soviet Russia. However, soon, President Woodrow Wilson repudiated the project and Bullitt resigned from Wilson's staff.

In 1921, Karl Kilbom was the head of the Swedish delegation at the Profintern congress (Red International of Labor Unions) held in Moscow. Their interpreter was a 17-year-old girl named Zoia Korvin-Krukovsky, and they soon became good friends. One morning, Zoia didn't show up, and Kilbom later found out that she had been arrested by the Soviet Secret Police as one of many suspects in a counterrevolutionary conspiracy. Kilbom refused to believe these allegations were true and spoke to high ranked Soviet officials like Karl Radek and Alexandra Kollontay to have the young girl released. Zoia was freed, and when she said she didn't want to stay in the Soviet Union, Karl Kilbom decided to marry the young girl so she could come with him to Sweden, where she helped the party working as a translator of Russian and became known as an artist.

In 1921, Sweden held its first democratic election where workers and women could vote, and Karl Kilbom was elected to the Lower House of the Riksdag.

=== Leader of the Swedish Communist Party ===
In August 1924, Zeth Höglund was expelled from the Swedish Communist Party, after having begun criticizing the development of the Comintern. Kilbom now took over as leader of the party.

In 1925, Karl Kilbom headed a delegation of 300 Swedish workers on a several weeks long visit to the Soviet Union. The tour ended with a parade on the Red Square in Moscow, where Kilbom, together with Bukharin and Rykov, held a speech from atop the Lenin Mausoleum.

The same year, Kilbom was asked by Bukharin to go to Germany as a representative of the Communist International to overlook the development of the Communist Party of Germany. Kilbom had been to Germany on political missions several times and the German police had started to recognize him. Because of this, Kilbom was now denied a visa by the German embassy in Stockholm. He decided to take the train to Copenhagen, where he made a new attempt at the German embassy in Denmark. He was denied a visa once again, but instead he managed to get help from some sailors and was smuggled on board a boat that took him to Germany. There he was greeted by Willi Münzenberg, who bought him a new suit and provided him with a fake passport with the name Karl Derry. He spent over three months in Germany and Austria, working to eliminate the ultra-leftist factions within the Communist parties.

Back in Moscow in 1926, Kilbom reported to Joseph Stalin about his work in Germany and expressed his concern about Ernst Thälmann not being a capable leader for the Communist Party of Germany (KPD). Stalin met the allegations against Thälmann with silence, and Kilbom would soon find out that Thälmann would be one of Stalin's closest allies in the unfolding internal struggle of the world communist movement.

Grigory Zinoviev wanted to send Kilbom on new missions for the Comintern to China and France, but Stalin objected. In 1927, Zinoviev together with Leon Trotsky were expelled from the Communist Party of the Soviet Union (CPSU).

In 1927, Karl Kilbom tried to work within the Comintern on how to develop strategies to combat fascism and to defend the Soviet Union against attacks from the Capitalist world. Kilbom advocated the creation of a popular front suggested that communists should try to collaborate with radical social democrats. The Italian communist leader Palmiro Togliatti agreed with Kilbom that the only way to defeat the fascist leader Benito Mussolini in Italy would be for the communists to unite with the social democrats. Stalin opposed Kilbom's suggestions and together with Ernst Thälmann, who now saw Karl Kilbom as a personal enemy, Stalin started to develop the idea of Social fascism, i.e., that social democrats were just as bad as fascists.

== Expelled from the Communist Party ==
In the fall of 1929, a Stalinist coup took place within the Swedish Communist Party, and Karl Kilbom together with the majority of the party's members were expelled by a group led by Hugo Sillén and Sven Linderot.

That same year, Kilbom launched a new Communist Party of Sweden, one that would be independent from Moscow, and became more critical of Stalin and the Soviet Union. In 1934 his party took the name Socialist Party (Socialistiska partiet). The party's supporters were generally called Kilbommare after Kilbom while the Comintern affiliated Communist Party members were called Sillénare after their party leader Hugo Sillén. The first couple of years, the Kilbom-Party was much bigger than the official Communist Party. Kilbom also managed to keep control over the communist daily Folkets Dagblad Politiken.

1931 was the year of the Ådalen Massacre, when the Swedish military opened fire on a demonstration of strikers, killing five workers. Kilbom wrote in Folkets Dagblad Politiken, calling the Swedish conservative government of Carl Gustaf Ekman a murder regime. For this “slander”, Kilbom was sentenced to two months in prison to be served at Långholmen, but he was eventually pardoned due to lung disease.

== Back to social democracy ==
In 1937, Karl Kilbom was expelled from the Socialist Party, as the leadership was taken over by Nils Flyg. Later, during World War II, Nils Flyg turned the remnants of the party into a pro-Nazi organization as he sided with Hitler in the war against Stalin. But by then, most members of the party had already left together with Kilbom.

In 1938, Karl Kilbom rejoined the Swedish Social Democratic Party. Kilbom became very active as a leader within the Folkets hus movement.

During World War II, Kilbom fully supported the Swedish coalition government under the leadership of Prime Minister Per Albin Hansson.

== Works ==
- Karl Kilbom wrote many political pamphlets and a huge number of articles in different papers.
- Kilbom's three volume autobiography, published 1953–1955, is called:

Ur mitt livs äventyr (My Life’s Adventure)
I hemligt uppdrag (On Secrete Mission)
Cirkeln slutes (The Circle is Completed)

- Kilbom has also written many books on the history of the Walloon People's immigration to Sweden and their typical trades.
