= Communist Party of Sweden (1924) =

- Abbreviation: SKP
- Leader: Zeth Höglund
- Founded: 1924
- Dissolved: 1926
- Split from: SKP
- Merged into: Social Democrats
- Newspaper: Den Nya Politiken
- Youth wing: AUF
- Ideology: Communism
- Political position: Left-wing

1924 election poster. Slogan reads 'Don't let the Reaction win – vote for the candidature Workers Party – Communists (Höglund wing)'. Head candidate of the list was Adolf Malmborg.

Communist Party of Sweden (Swedish: Sverges Kommunistiska Parti) was a political party in Sweden led by Zeth Höglund. Höglund broke away from the main SKP in 1924, following disagreements concerning Comintern policies and functioning. He then set up his own SKP. Höglund's SKP had around 5,000 members, and published the newspaper Den Nya Politiken.

In 1926, SKP of Höglund merged into the Social Democrats.

Höglund's SKP had a youth wing called Arbetarnas Ungdomsförbund.
