= Democratic Farmers League of Sweden =

The Democratic Farmers League of Sweden (Swedish: Sverges demokratiska jordbrukareförbund, abbreviated SDJ) was an organization of farmers in Sweden.

SDJ was founded in February 1918, at a congress with delegates from different parts of the country. The Cultivators' League (Odlareförbundet) merged into SDJ. Their publication, Odlaren ('The Cultivator'), was overtaken by SDJ.

The organization was linked to the Social Democratic Left Party of Sweden (SSV, later the Communist Party of Sweden). SDJ had a sectorial and economic programme, but also a radical political programme. Regarding politics in general, the SDJ programme was largely the same as that of SSV. The agrarian programme of SDJ was detailed, but did not deviate from the SSV line significantly. The organization argued that independent farmers, owning their own plots, should have the right to trade full ownership to a modernized åborätt (copyhold), thus relieving them from debts. SDJ also sought to improve the economic position of its members, for example by promoting setting up cooperatives and economic associations.

The members were generally independent farmers. In situations when independent farmers who were members of SDJ took up jobs as labourers at estates, the organization managed negotiations over wages and price lists.

SDJ was never able to make any significant breakthrough among smaller peasants. The organization was dissolved after a few years. In SSV there had been dissatisfaction with SDJ, which was seen as not agitating enough for the party.
