= C.-H. Hermansson =

Swedish politician (1917–2016)

C.-H. Hermansson SKP
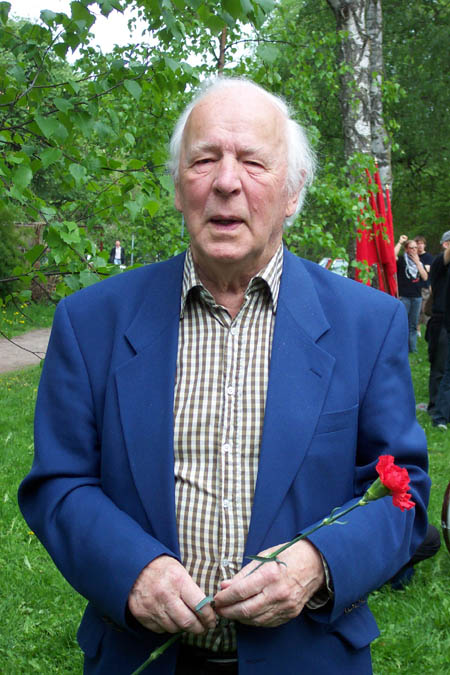
- C.-H. Hermansson at a Young Left convention in May 2003

Leader of the Left Party Communists
- In office 1964–1975
- Preceded by: Hilding Hagberg
- Succeeded by: Lars Werner

Member of the Swedish Parliament for Stockholm Municipality
- In office 1963–1985

Personal details
- Born: 14 December 1917 Bollnäs, Sweden
- Died: 26 July 2016 (aged 98) Stockholm, Sweden
- Party: Left Party Communists
- Profession: Politician

Carl-Henrik "C.-H." Hermansson (14 December 1917 – 26 July 2016) was a Swedish politician who served as chairman of the Communist Party of Sweden (during his leadership renamed the Left Party – Communists) from 1964 to 1975 and member of parliament from 1963 to 1985. He was a major force in redirecting Left Party policies away from Moscow loyalism towards Eurocommunism and Scandinavian Popular Socialism. He wrote several books regarding capitalism and the owners of the large corporations, as well as on communists and the policies of the left.

At the time of Joseph Stalin's death in 1953, Hermansson praised Stalin as a brilliant scientist and a great leader. He subsequently regretted this and referred to his own words about Stalin as reprehensible.

Preceded by Hilding Hagberg	Leader of the Swedish Left Party – Communists; 1964–1975	Succeeded by Lars Werner
