= Blekinge Folkblad =

Newspaper published in Sweden 1943–1957

Blekinge Folkblad was a communist newspaper published in Blekinge, Sweden from January 1943 to April 1957. The newspaper was published weekly, except for the period from October 1953 to November 1956 when it was published daily. The editorial office was initially based in Ronneby, but was shifted to Karlskrona in 1944. The weekly edition peaked in 1946 with 5450. Ivar Petersson was editor of the newspaper until 1951. Tage Johnsson was editor from 1953 to 1957.
