= Hilding Hagberg =

Swedish communist politician (1899–1993)

Hilding Hagberg K
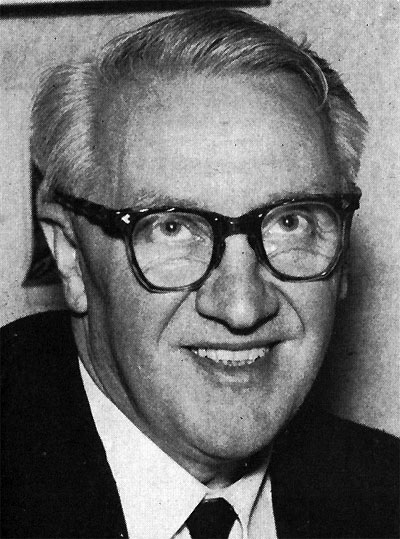
- Hilding Hagberg, circa 1960

Leader of the Communist party
- In office 1951–1964
- Preceded by: Sven Linderot
- Succeeded by: C.-H. Hermansson

Member of the Riksdag's Second Chamber for Stockholm Municipality
- In office 1933–1952
- Constituency: Västerbotten County and Norrbotten County

Member of the Riksdag's Second Chamber for Västerbotten and Norrbotten County
- In office 1953–1964
- Constituency: Stockholm Municipality

Personal details
- Born: 28 October 1899 Gällivare Parish, Gällivare, Norrbotten County, Sweden
- Died: 17 December 1993 (aged 94) Luleå, Norrbotten County, Sweden
- Party: Workers' Party – The Communists (1977–1993)
- Other political affiliations: Communist (1917–1977)

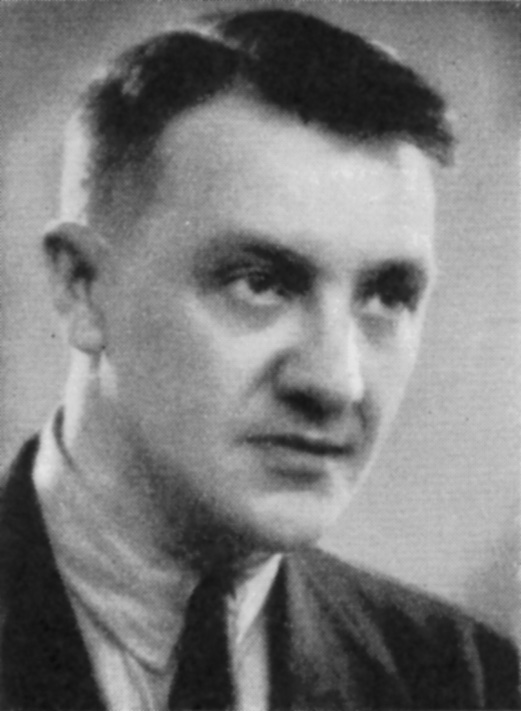
Picture of Hagberg c. 1938

Karl Hilding Hagberg (28 October 1899 – 17 December 1993) was a Swedish communist politician. He was the leader of the Communist Party of Sweden from 1951 to 1964.

== History ==
Hagberg was born in Gällivare in Norrbotten County. As a miner working in Malmberget he joined the Communist Party of Sweden in his youth. He was editor of the communist newspaper Norrskensflamman from 1930 to 1935, and political editor of the Communist Party's main newspaper Ny Dag from 1943 to 1964. He was a member of the executive board of the Communist Party of Sweden from 1930 to 1964, and a member of the lower house of the Parliament of Sweden from 1933 to 1964.

As leader of the Communist Party of Sweden, Hagberg upheld a clearly pro-Soviet line. He supported the Soviet crushing of the Hungarian Revolution of 1956 and he also defended the building of the Berlin Wall as "serving the cause of peace".

In the municipal elections in 1962, the Communist Party hit a record low of 3.8% of the votes, and critics within the party blamed this on the party's pro-Soviet line. In 1964, Hagberg was replaced as party chairman by C.-H. Hermansson. When a pro-Soviet faction broke away from the party in 1977 to form the Workers' Party - the Communists, Hagberg joined them.

Hagberg died in his home in Luleå on 17 December 1993. His memoirs, titled Jag är och förblir kommunist ("I am and will remain a communist"), were published in 1995.

Party political offices
Preceded by Sven Linderot	Leader of the Communist Party of Sweden; 1951 – 1964	Succeeded by C.-H. Hermansson
