= Sweden during World War II =

Sweden's location in Europe (1942) Sweden German Reich Areas under German occupation German allies, co-belligerents and puppet states Allies and territories occupied by the allies Other neutral territories

Sweden maintained its policy of neutrality during World War II. When the war began on 1 September 1939, the fate of Sweden was unclear. But by a combination of its geopolitical location in the Scandinavian Peninsula, realpolitik maneuvering during an unpredictable course of events, and a dedicated military build-up after 1942, Sweden kept its official neutrality status throughout the war. At the outbreak of hostilities, Sweden had held a neutral stance in international relations for more than a century, since the end of the Napoleonic Wars in 1814 and the invasion of Norway.

At the outbreak of the war in September 1939, twenty European nations were neutral. Sweden was one of only nine of these nations to maintain this stance for the remainder of the war, along with Ireland, Portugal, Spain, Switzerland, and the microstates of Andorra, Liechtenstein, Vatican City, and San Marino. The Swedish government made a few concessions, and sometimes breached the nation's neutrality in favor of both Germany and, later, the Western Allies.

During the German invasion of the Soviet Union (June–July 1941), Sweden allowed the Wehrmacht to use Swedish railways to transport the German 163rd Infantry Division along with heavy weapons from Norway to Finland. Until 1943, German soldiers traveling on leave between Norway and Germany were allowed passage through Sweden—the so-called permittenttrafik. Iron ore was sold to Germany throughout the war and Germany owned several mines in Sweden that had been bought by German companies before the outbreak of the war. These mines were called Tyskgruvorna ("German mines"). For the Allies, Sweden shared military intelligence and helped to train soldier refugees from Denmark and Norway, to be used in the liberation of their home countries. It also allowed the Allies to use Swedish airbases between 1944 and 1945.

Swedish neutrality remains a subject of debate. Proponents argue that during the war, Sweden softened its policy against accepting refugees, admitting thousands of Jews and political dissenters from Norway and Denmark. Conversely, opponents such as Winston Churchill suggest that Sweden "ignored the greater moral issues of the war and played both sides for profit."

== Background ==
=== Political ===
Between 1523 and Sweden's final war with the Russian Empire in 1809, a state of war had existed between these two countries for 67 out of those 286 years. Russia was seen as the historical hereditary enemy of Sweden. In the peace that followed the Finnish War in 1809, all of Finland had been ceded to Russia and Sweden was reduced to two thirds of its former size.

As the end of the 19th century approached, and the beginning of the 20th began, Sweden, like many other nations, became beset by strikes and public disorder. Appalling working conditions were no longer tolerated and the working class was rising against the state. In 1908 alone, there were about 300 strikes in Sweden. By 1917, Sweden's need for a new political system was apparent from these riots. Sweden had remained neutral during World War One but with a tendency to side with the Central Powers. Since the 1880s, the socialist movement in Sweden had been divided into two opposing groups: the revolutionary socialists, a communist movement; and the reformists, a social democratic movement – the latter of which being the larger of the two. In 1917, the rules of democracy were changed in Sweden, the electorate's size grew and in 1921, women were also allowed to vote.

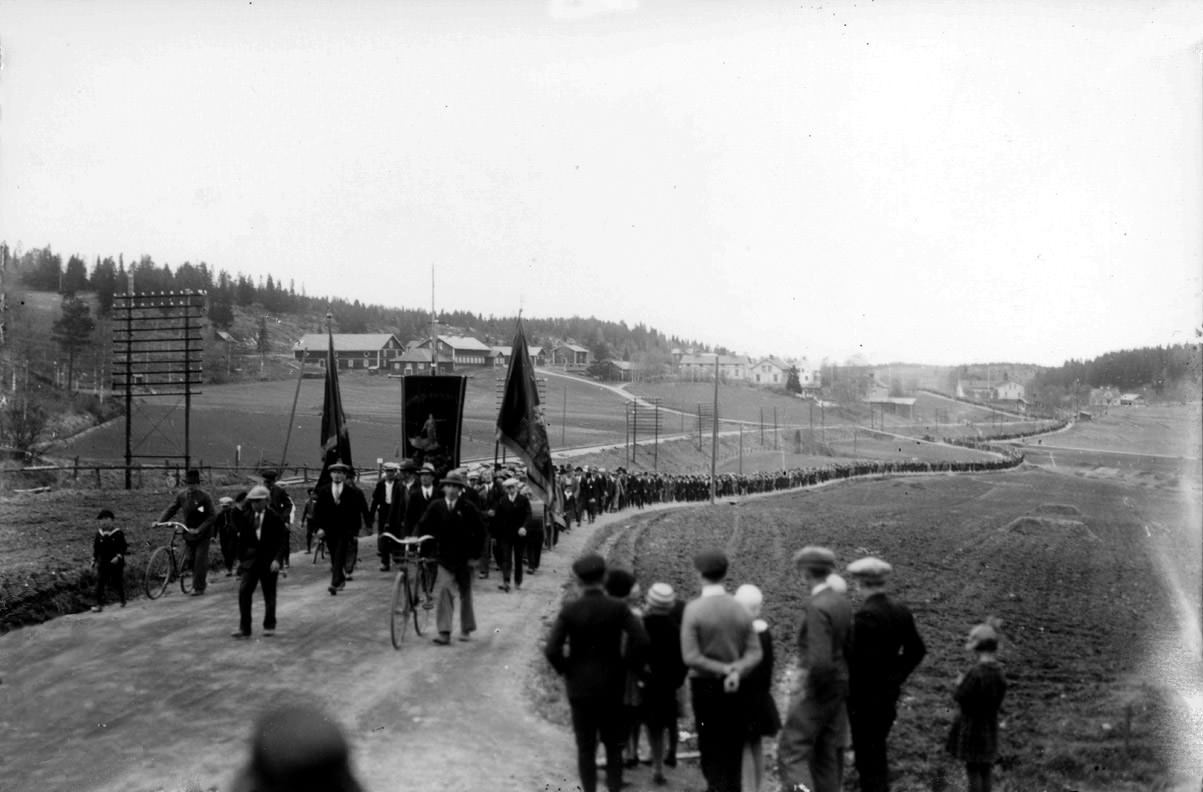
Ådalen shootings. This picture of the demonstration was taken before the military opened fire.

But even these reforms were seen as far too radical by some conservatives. Some wanted strong leadership and did not believe in democracy. In the 1920s and 1930s, confrontations between employers and employees in Sweden continued. In 1931, this culminated with the Ådalen shootings, an incident where the military opened fire on a protest march. In the same year, a secret right-wing militia, the Munckska kåren, was exposed. It had recruited about 2,000 men and had access to heavy weaponry. It was disbanded the next year.

At the other end of the political spectrum, following the Russian Civil War the Russian Empire had become the Soviet Union and many Swedish communists were cooperating with this new Soviet regime, seeking to realize a world revolution. Compromise and a parliamentary system were thought to stand in the way of a more equal and just society.

A new cabinet led by the social democrats with Per Albin Hansson as Prime Minister took control in 1932. A policy of cooperation and consensus was pursued, which led to a furthering of the divide between the two socialist factions: the communists and the Reformist Left. The distance between these two, at least at the ideological level, became so great that the communists often referred to the social democrats as "the social fascists". Apart from a period termed "the vacation government" (Swedish: semesterregeringen) between 19 June and 28 September 1936, Per Albin Hansson was to be the Prime Minister of Sweden until his death in 1946.

=== Military ===
Sweden had very few tanks in the inter-war era. For a time, the entire armoured corps consisted of ten Stridsvagn mf/21s. This was a design based upon a German First World War tank and had been secretly purchased by Sweden in the form of tractor assembly kits.

In the Defence Act of 1936, it was decided to form two tank battalions. Captain Fale Burman, chief of Army Procurement (Arméns utrustningsdetalj) in 1937, commented:

... Härför krävdes total nyanskaffning av deras viktigaste innehåll, stridsvagnarna. Redan på ett tidigt stadium fick vi dock klart för oss att om vi enbart valde kanonutrustade vagnar skulle de högst komma upp till ett antal av 15–20.

This required the purchase of their main piece of military hardware, tanks. Already at an early stage, it was clear to us that if we simply chose the cannon-equipped tanks, we could have at most 15–20 of them.)

— Försvarsbeslut

To make sure training at the battalion level would be possible, machine gun–equipped tanks were purchased as well. By 1939, Sweden had 48 Czechoslovak-built tanks with machine gun armament and about 20 Stridsvagn L-60 tanks armed with a 20 mm main gun.

The Swedish Army had been organized into four divisions since the 1890s, with the regiments of northern Norrland and Gotland standing as separate units. This was outdated, and in 1942, a new military organization was adopted.

=== Pre-war trade ===
During World War II, Swedish industry had to supply an increased share of its own domestic goods owing to the British naval blockade of the North Sea, whilst satisfying the vastly increased demand for armaments. Before the war, the annual production of armaments was typically measured in tens of millions of Swedish kronor, but during the war, output exceeded SEK 1 billion (US$240 million).

=== Military balance ===
Sweden's long-standing policy of neutrality was tested on many occasions during the 1930s. The challenges came from a strongly rejuvenated, nationalistic Germany. From 1919 until 1935, Sweden had been an active supporter of the League of Nations and most of Sweden's political energy in the international arena had been directed towards the League's preservation.

The Swedish non-aligned policy during this period was founded on the assumption that there were two opposing powers in the Baltic Sea region, Germany and the Soviet Union; because these two powers needed to guard against each other, the hope was that they would only ever be able to deploy minor forces against Sweden or other non-aligned countries. It was this expectation which made the defence of a small country feasible. The Molotov–Ribbentrop Pact, signed at the end of August 1939 between Nazi Germany and the Soviet Union, upset this balance.

=== Pre-war preparations ===
In 1936, the Swedish government started to heighten its military preparedness as the international situation worsened. Military spending in Sweden went from US$37 million in 1936, to $50 million in 1937, to $58.6 million in 1938, and then increased over fivefold to $322.3 million in 1939. During World War II itself, military spending peaked at $527.6 million in 1942.

Not only was the Swedish government buying material to strengthen its defences, it began drafting conscripts. On 6 May 1938, the government called up all those aged 15 for short periods of training. In addition to this, the Swedish Cabinet ordered that one quarter of those conscripted in 1938 should be retained for further training.

In 1940, the Home Guard was created. Its units were small groups of former soldiers who were equipped with rifles, machine guns, ammunition, medicine and uniforms. They had the option to buy additional materials such as skis, sweaters and marching boots. The Swedish Women's Voluntary Defence Organization had already been in existence since 1924.

While arming itself, Sweden felt that it was necessary to articulate and enforce its policy of neutrality. Per Albin Hansson's statement shortly before World War II began:

Friendly with all other nations and strongly linked to our neighbors, we look on no one as our enemy. There is no place in the thoughts of our people for aggression against any other country, and we note with gratitude, the assurances from others that they have no wish to disturb our peace, our freedom, or our independence. The strengthening of our defense preparations serves merely to underline our fixed determination to keep our country outside the conflicts that may erupt amongst others and, during such conflicts, to safeguard the existence of our people.

— Per-Albin Hansson, 1 September 1939

Georg Homin, a captain on the General Staff, stated:

Without a defensive force we cannot follow any policy of our own, our declarations become merely empty words and we leave the country's fate to chance, or to the decisions of others. With a defense as strong as Swedish conditions allow, we secure for ourselves the basis of a continued independent Swedish policy.

— Georg Homin

== War ==
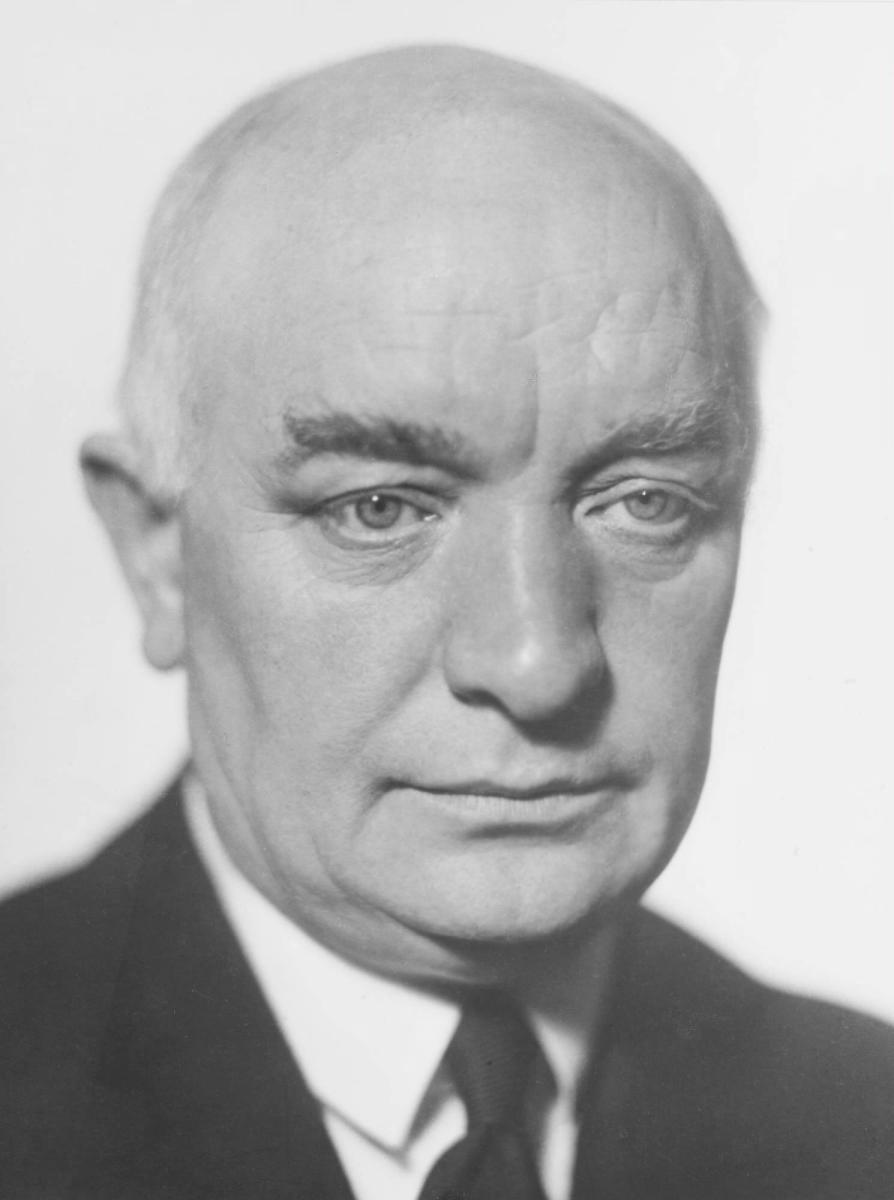
Swedish Prime Minister Per Albin Hansson declared Sweden neutral on 1 September 1939.

When, in September 1939, Germany attacked Poland and both France and Britain declared war on Nazi Germany, Sweden declared itself a neutral country in regard to this escalating situation. An example illustrating this situation may be the failed Allied attempt to release Polish submarines (ORP Ryś, ORP Żbik, ORP Sęp) which were interned after they reached Swedish ports (requiring repairs of battle damage, unable to break the German blockade and sail to Britain).

On the outbreak of the Winter War between Finland and the Soviet Union in November 1939, Sweden declared itself to be "non-belligerent" in regard to this particular conflict, actively siding with Finland. This allowed Sweden to aid Finland economically, and with armaments. Sweden and Finland also jointly laid minefields in the Sea of Åland to deter Soviet submarines from entering the Gulf of Bothnia.

=== Foreign trade ===
Sweden was not directly attacked during World War II. It was, however, subject to British and German naval blockades and accidental bombings from the Soviets on some cities (e.g. Strängnäs), which led to problems with the supply of food and fuels. When Germany invaded Denmark and Norway in April 1940, coupled with a German blockade of the North Sea, every shipment had to be negotiated with both British and German authorities, which drastically reduced the volume of trade. Between 1938 and 1944, the Swedish import of petroleum products and coal decreased by 88% and 53% respectively, which led to severe shortages. Other critical items were natural rubber, alloy metals and food. This situation led to extensive rationing of fuels and food in Sweden and substitutes were developed and produced. Wood gas was used as a fuel for motor vehicles and shale oil as a substitute for bunker oil.

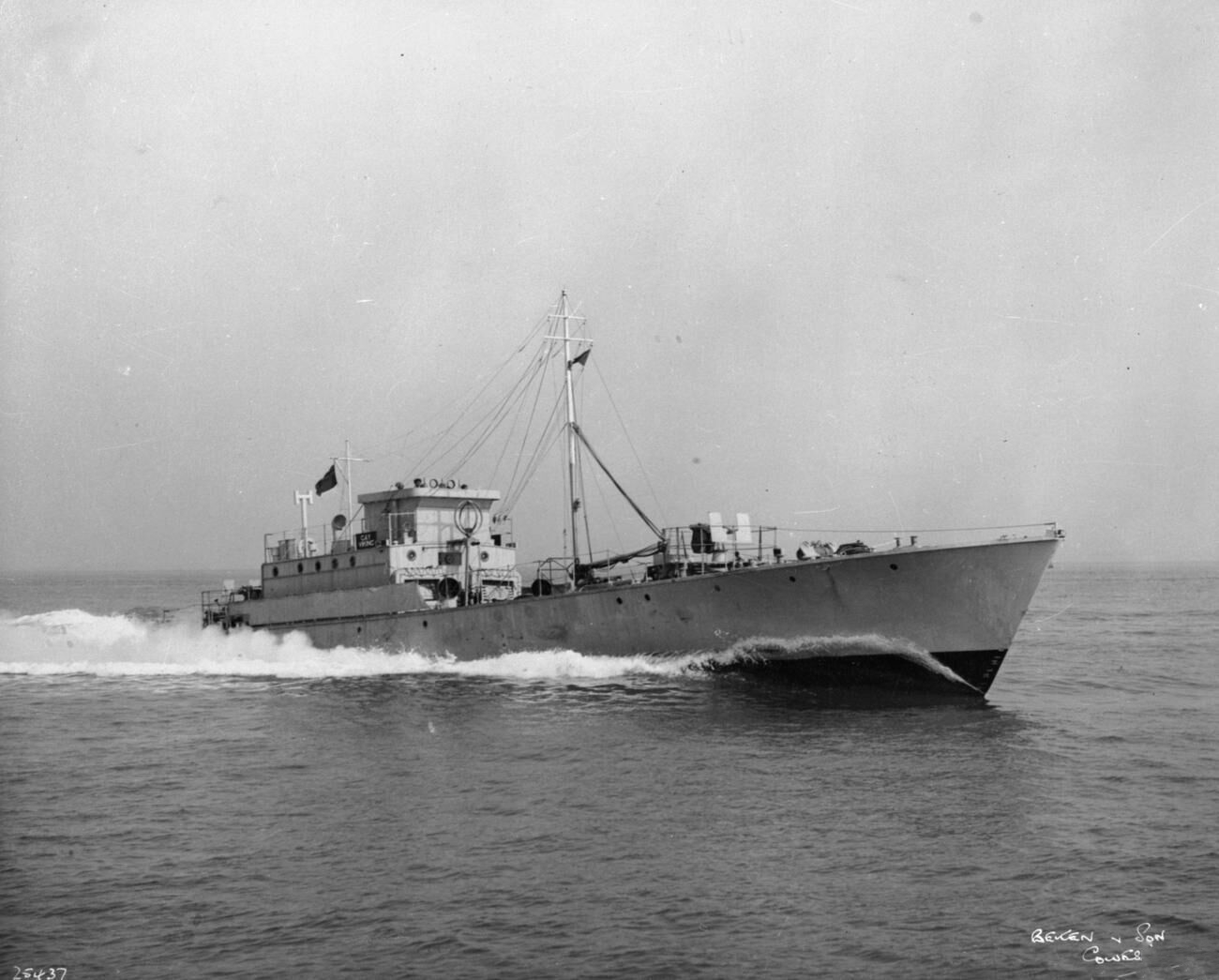
Gay Viking, one of the high speed boats used as blockade runners for the ball bearing trade

At the beginning of the war, agreements had been signed between Sweden and the United Kingdom and Nazi Germany in order to sustain vital trade; but in spite of this, and the fact that Sweden had declared itself a neutral country, Swedish shipping came under attack. Sweden's trade with Britain was cut by a total of 70%. Within the North Sea blockade, trade with Germany increased, until 37% of Sweden's exports were shipped to Germany. For very important goods such as ball bearings from SKF for the British aircraft industry, delivery was made by blockade runners, using rebuilt Motor Gun Boats, which could use winter darkness and high speed to penetrate the German blockade of the Skagerrak straits between Norway and the northern tip of Denmark.

Before the outbreak of the war, the Swedish Ministry of defence (Royal Swedish Air Force Materiel Administration) had ordered some 300 combat aircraft from the United States, primarily Seversky P-35s and P-66 Vanguards. In 1940, however, the US administration halted these exports. Only about 60 aircraft had been delivered. Sweden succeeded subsequently in buying 200 aircraft from Italy, a fascist ally of Germany at the time; these aircraft were primarily Fiat CR.42 Falcos, Reggiane Re.2000s, and Caproni Ca.313s.

=== Measures to protect against air raids ===
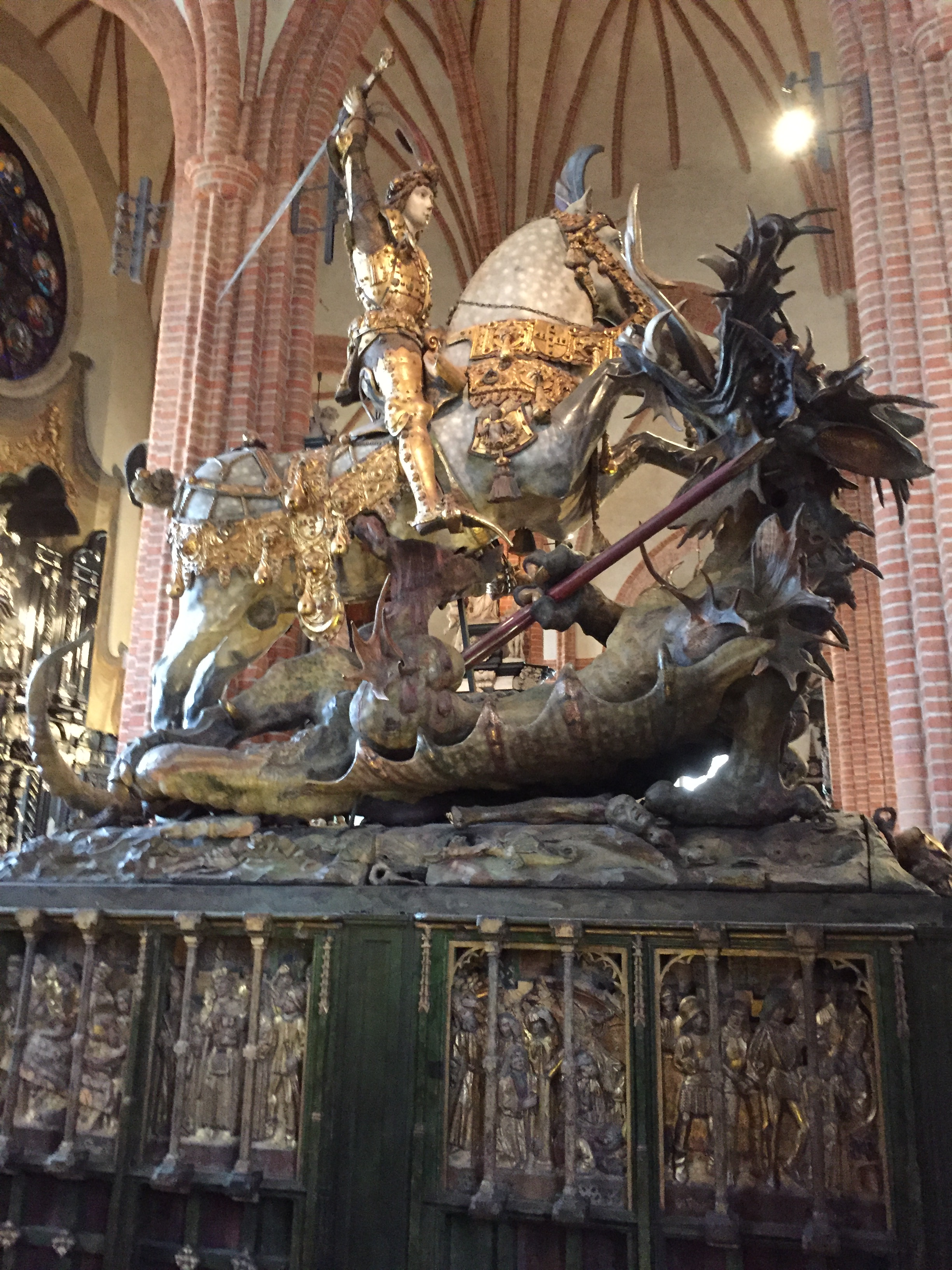
Saint George and the Dragon, a late medieval sculpture group in Storkyrkan in Stockholm, was protected from bombing.

Beginning in the autumn of 1938, efforts were made to protect cities and towns from air raids. In order to decrease the risk of large fires breaking out the attics of all buildings were cleared in the larger towns. After the outbreak of war all windows in towns were to be covered quickly in the event of an air raid. Historic buildings such as medieval churches were in many cases protected by moving valuable objects or covering external ornaments. The vast sculpture group Saint George and the Dragon, located in Storkyrkan in Stockholm, was disassembled and evacuated to an underground space in April 1940.

=== Winter War ===
==== Impact on domestic politics ====
War broke out between Finland and the Soviet Union in November 1939. In Sweden, the Liberal, Conservative and Agrarian parties were concerned about a perceived threat from the Soviet Union. The Social Democrats were in the main equally concerned. Leading social democrats like Rickard Sandler and Torsten Nilsson played a prominent role in mustering support for Finland. The Communists were openly loyal to the Soviet Union and supported its Molotov–Ribbentrop Pact with Germany. However, when Germany invaded the Soviet Union in June 1941, they swung around to a pro-Allied view.

==== Defence of Finland ====
When the Soviet Union attacked Finland in November 1939, many Swedes favored some sort of involvement in the conflict, both on a humanitarian and on a military basis. Sweden's interest in Finland lay in the fact that Finland had been an integrated part of Sweden for more than six hundred years, with Sweden losing control of its eastern provinces in 1809. Despite several pleas from the Finnish government, the Swedish government declined to engage militarily with the Red Army as it advanced during the Winter War. However, Sweden declared itself "non-belligerent" rather than neutral during the conflict and as many as 8,000 Swedes voluntarily went to Finland to fight. The Swedish government and public also sent food, clothing, medicine, weapons and ammunition to aid the Finns during this conflict. This military aid included:

- 135,402 rifles, 347 machine guns, and 450 light machine guns with 50,013,300 rounds of small arms ammunition
- 144 field guns, 100 anti-aircraft guns and 92 anti-tank guns with 301,846 shells
- 300 naval mines and 500 depth charges
- 17 fighter aircraft, five light bombers, one DC-2 transport aircraft turned into a bomber, and three reconnaissance aircraft

Twelve of Sweden's most modern fighter aircraft, British Gloster Gladiators, were flown by volunteer Swedish pilots under Finnish insignia. These aircraft constituted one third of Sweden's fighter force at the time. In addition, Sweden received some 70,000 Finnish children who were sent to Sweden to find safety during the 1940s.

In addition to the military aid sent to Finland, the Swedish government secretly facilitated the delivery of aircraft that Finland had purchased or received as donations from other countries. A total of 157 planes were assembled in volunteering Swedish factories, while Finnish pilots collected an additional 35 planes in Sweden after they were flown in from abroad. The Royal Swedish Air Force Materiel Administration and the Swedish Air Force provided logistical support for these operations, with discreet approval from the Swedish government to avoid provoking significant protests from the Soviet Union.

On 21 February 1940, seven Soviet bombers accidentally dropped around 150 bombs over Pajala in Norrbotten County. Six buildings caught fire and two people were injured. The event sparked further debate on whether Sweden should send aid to the Finns.

==== Possible Allied invasion ====
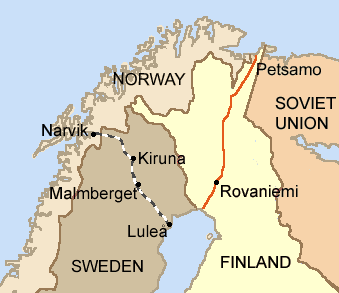
Franco-British support was offered to Finland on the condition it was given free passage through neutral Norway and Sweden, instead of taking the road from Soviet-occupied Petsamo.

German industry was heavily dependent on Swedish iron ore. The Allies had intended to use the Soviet attack on Finland in November 1939 as cover for seizing the important Swedish iron ore deposits in the north, in addition to the Norwegian harbours through which this ore was shipped to Germany. The plan was to get Norwegian and Swedish permission to send an expeditionary force to Finland across northern Norway and Sweden, ostensibly to help the Finns. But once in place, they were to proceed to take control of the harbours and the iron ore mines, occupying cities such as Gävle and Luleå and denying German access to the Swedish iron ore. In this way, an unsuspecting Norway and Sweden would be presented with a fait accompli. Realizing this danger, however, and the consequent possibility of Allied or German occupation and of the war being waged on their territory, both the Swedes and the Norwegians refused to allow this proposal.

Meanwhile, the Germans, having suspected an Allied threat, were making their own plans for an invasion of Norway in order to protect their strategic supply lines. The Altmark Incident of 16 February 1940 convinced Hitler that the Allies would not respect Norwegian neutrality, so he ordered plans for an invasion.

Scandinavian reluctance to allow Allied troops onto their territory had halted the original Allied plan for using aid to Finland as a pretext for moving in troops, but on 12 March 1940, the Allies decided to try a "semi-peaceful" invasion nonetheless. Troops were to be landed in Norway, and proceed into Sweden to capture the Swedish iron ore mines. However, if serious military resistance was encountered, they were not to press the issue. The plan was abandoned with the ending of the Winter War on 13 March. The Germans were partly aware of these Allied intentions, as they had intercepted radio traffic showing that Allied transport groups were being readied. A few days later, they also intercepted messages confirming that the Allies had abandoned their plan and were to redeploy their forces.

German plans for an invasion of Norway continued, since Hitler feared that the Allies were nonetheless intent upon launching their own invasion. 9 April was set as the date of Operation Weserübung, the German attack on Norway.

Hitler was correct about Allied intentions. The Allied plan had two parts, Operation Wilfred and Plan R 4. Operation Wilfred was to take place on 5 April (it was in fact delayed until 8 April) when Norwegian territorial waters were to be mined, violating Norwegian neutrality. This would force the ships carrying ore to Germany to travel outside the protection of Norwegian territorial waters and thus become legitimate targets for the Royal Navy. It was hoped that this would provoke a German military reaction. As soon as the Germans reacted, under "Plan R 4", 18,000 Allied troops were to land in Narvik, closing the rail link to Sweden. Other cities that the Allies hoped to capture were Trondheim and Bergen.

The first ship carrying Allied troops was to start its journey a few hours after the mine-laying. On 8 April, a Royal Naval detachment led by HMS Renown mined Norwegian waters as a part of Operation Wilfred, but German troops were already on their way and "Plan R 4" was quickly made obsolete.

=== Occupation of Denmark and Norway ===
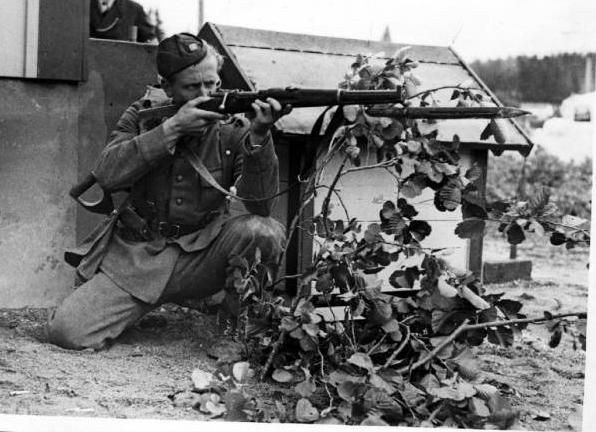
Swedish soldier during World War II

On 9 April 1940, Germany launched Operation Weserübung, an operation with the objective of simultaneously occupying Denmark and Norway, and to stage a coup d'état in Norway. This move had several far-reaching consequences for Sweden. Sweden was in effect cut off from trade with the western world and therefore more dependent on German goodwill, ultimately leading to permittenttrafik. But it also lessened the immediate risk that Sweden would become a theater of war between the Axis and the Allies.

When Germany invaded both Denmark and Norway on 9 April 1940, the 100,000 Swedish soldiers who had been deployed along the Finnish border in northern Sweden were in the process of being demobilized, owing to the end of the Winter War there. Before the outbreak of hostilities, Sweden had had no plans for defending Norway or any defence strategy against a German invasion from the direction of Norway. Moreover, an agreement from the dissolution of the union between Norway and Sweden in 1905 stated that no fortification was allowed along this border. One of Germany's demands on Sweden, as Germany's invasion progressed, was that Sweden was not to mobilize. However, Sweden re-organized its system of mobilization to allow for personal order by letter to be made possible as an alternative to official proclamation, so that 320,000 men were able to be raised in a few weeks. This was called "The Organization" and was barely different from a full mobilization when completed. Sweden also started to build fortifications at the Norwegian border and along the coast of Scania.

During its invasion of Norway, Germany demanded access to the Swedish telephone and telegraph lines between Germany and Norway. Sweden allowed this, but tapped the lines. In the early summer of 1940, the Swedish mathematician Arne Beurling succeeded in deciphering and discovering the source codes of the Geheimfernschreiber cypher machine that Germany used, which afforded the Swedes advance knowledge of Germany's military intentions. Although the British Plan R 4 had not been able to be carried out, Allied troops were swiftly sent to Norway and were able to fight alongside the Norwegians unsuccessfully against the German invaders. However, the success of the German campaign against France and the occupation of the Low Countries led to a British troop re-deployment and by 8 June 1940, British troops had been evacuated from Norway.

In his book Blodsporet ("The Blood Track"), Espen Eidum detailed how, at the request of Adolf Hitler, Nazi Germany sent three trains with 30 to 40 sealed carriages through Sweden to the battle of Narvik. These trains ostensibly transported medical personnel and food for the wounded German soldiers in Narvik. However, in reality there were 17 soldiers for every medical officer or orderly. Sweden knew that the trains were being used to transport troops because a Swedish representative in Berlin reported that he had watched them board. The trains also transported heavy artillery, anti-aircraft guns, ammunition, and communications and supply equipment.

=== Midsummer Crisis ===
At the start of the German invasion of the Soviet Union in the early summer of 1941, codenamed Operation Barbarossa, the Germans asked Sweden to allow the transportation of armed German troops, the 163rd Infantry Division, commanded by General Erwin Engelbrecht, along with all its military equipment, through Swedish territory by train from Norway to the eastern front in Finland. Finland also insisted on the transfer of the division.

The Swedish government granted this permission after two days of internal debate. In Sweden, the political deliberations surrounding this are known as the "Midsummer Crisis"; however, according to research by Carl-Gustaf Scott there never was a "crisis", he argues that "the crisis was created in historical hindsight in order to protect the political legacy of the Social Democratic Party and its leader Per Albin Hansson". Dick Harryson explains that there was a risk of the coalition government falling apart if the Social Democrats, for which Per Albin Hansson was the leader, voted no to the transfer and the right wing parties voted yes. Per Albin Hansson did not want a government in crisis and recommended to vote yes. Ernst Wigforss convinced the Social Democrats to vote no with a large majority by stating that this was about choosing sides in the war. Per Albin Hansson then asked for a second vote on how the Social Democrats would react to the right wing voting yes. The opinion was split, but the majority would rather accept the transfer than bring down the government. Since Sweden was not neutral in relation to Finland during the Winter War but non-belligerent, it is debatable if the transfer constituted a violation of neutrality even if the transfer occurred after the Soviet Union attacked Finland starting the Continuation War and Sweden was yet to take a stance in this conflict.

=== 1943 onward ===
From late 1942 and into 1943, Germany began to meet with a series of military reverses after its losses at the Second Battle of El Alamein, the Battle of Stalingrad and elsewhere. Germany was forced into a more defensive position as the Allied forces achieved success on the battlefield. It was becoming increasingly apparent to Sweden that Germany was unlikely to win the war. Prior to 1943, Sweden's policy of neutrality had been largely under the close scrutiny of Germany. After August and September 1943, however, Sweden was increasingly able to resist German demands and to soften its stance to Allied pressure. However, despite Germany's new, defensive posture, Sweden's constant fear was that the unexpected would happen, an attitude that continued until the very end of the war. With Germany's weakening position came stronger demands from the Allies. They pushed for Sweden to abandon its trade with Germany and to stop all German troop movements over Swedish soil. Sweden accepted payments from the Allies to compensate for this loss of income through reduced trade with Germany, but continued to sell steel and machine parts to Nazi Germany at inflated smugglers' rates.

=== Training of Norwegian and Danish troops ===
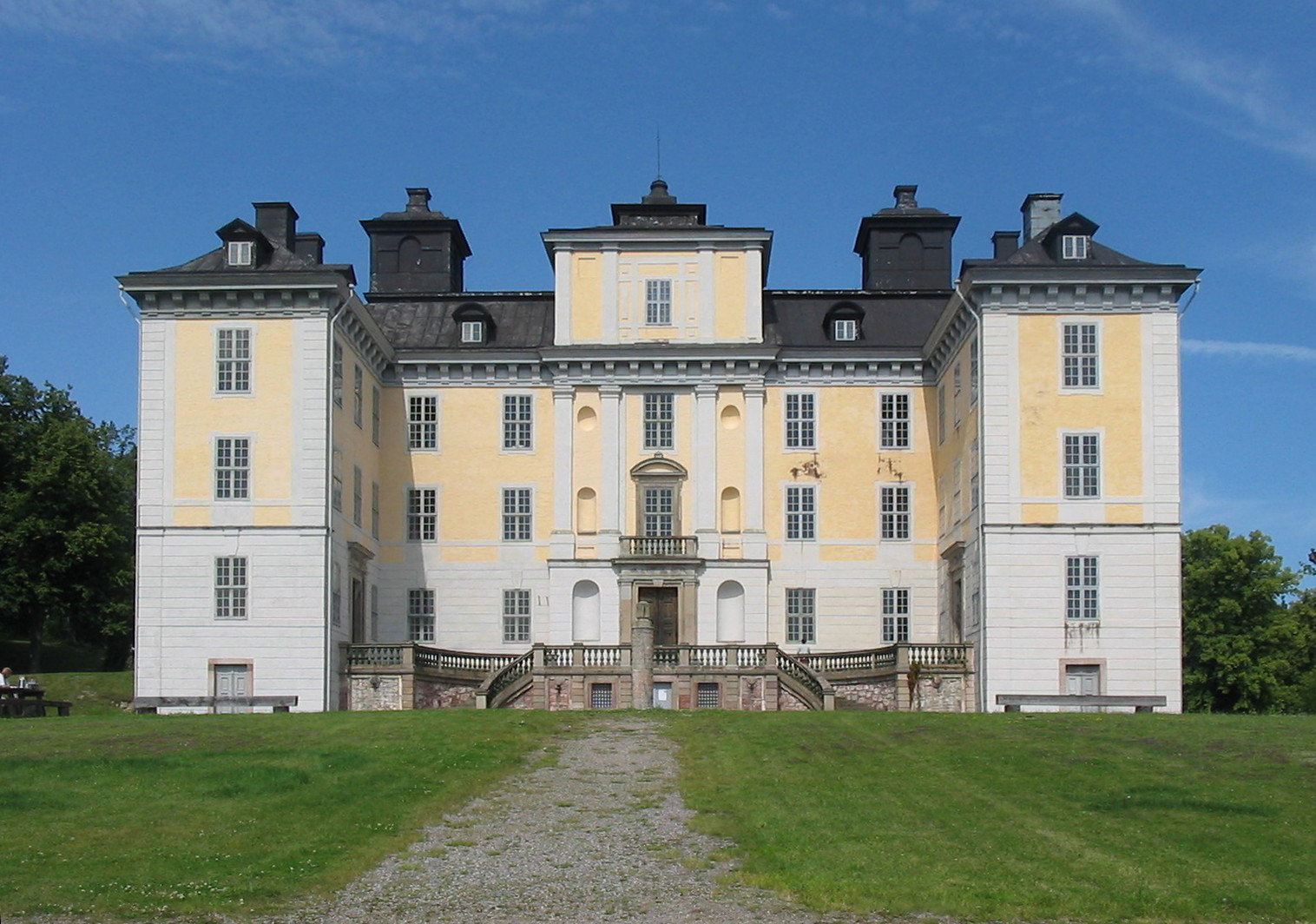
Mälsåker Castle was a Norwegian military academy during World War II (photograph taken in 2007).

During the war, more than 50,000 Norwegians fled to Sweden. These refugees were sent to camps at Öreryd in Småland and Kjesäter in Södermanland. From the summer of 1943 onward, the military training of Norwegian troops was carried out in Sweden, in cooperation with the Swedish government and the Norwegian government-in-exile in London. To prevent protests from Nazi Germany, this training was ostensibly for the Norwegian police. From the start, the recruits only had light infantry weapons, but later they were able to train with artillery. Military exercises were held in Dalarna in December 1944 and in Hälsingland in spring 1945. Eight thousand men took part in this latter exercise.

In all, around 15,000 men were trained and organized into ten battalions and at the end of the war, eight of these battalions, about 13,500 men, were ready for action. They entered Norway on 8 May 1945. The number of Danish refugees had been much lower than the 50,000 Norwegians, but a brigade of about 3,600 Danish men was also trained and they were transferred to Denmark on 5 May 1945.

=== The Bäckebo rocket ===
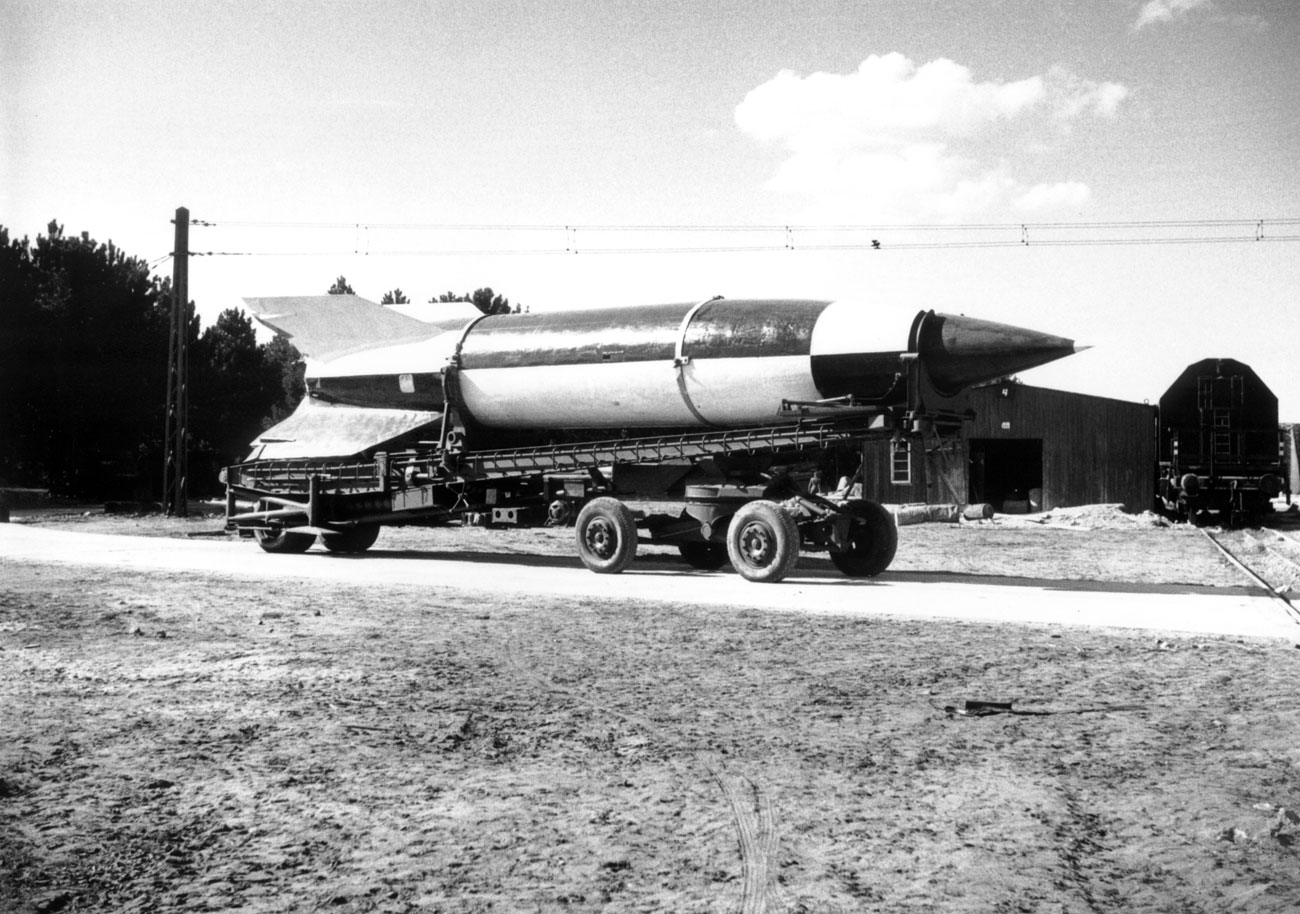
A German V-2 rocket

On 13 June 1944, a V-2 rocket under test by the Germans (test rocket V-89, serial number 4089) from Peenemünde crashed in Sweden after the rocket had flown into cumulus clouds which had strayed into the controller's line of sight. It was supposed to crash in the sea outside Bornholm in occupied Denmark. V-89 contained a FuG 230 Straßburg radio control receiver unit, normally commanded by a remote FuG 203 Kehl joystick-equipped radio control transmitter set that had also been meant for use with the Wasserfall anti-aircraft missile (code named Burgund), as a development of the same FuG 203/230 equipment pairing used to guide both the Fritz X gravity-propulsion guided ordnance and the Henschel Hs 293 glide bomb. The ground controller appeared to have no trouble manoeuvring the rocket until it disappeared into the high cloud layer.

A captured German prisoner later explained to the British that the controller was an expert at steering glider bombs from aircraft, but that the spectacle of a rocket launch had caused him to incorrectly operate the control lever in his astonishment. Peenemünde guidance and control expert Ernst Steinhoff explained that the excited operator applied a set of planned corrections (such as that for the Earth's rotation) in the opposite direction from the way he had been instructed. The rocket subsequently exploded in an air burst (a common V-2 malfunction) about 1500 metres above the county of Bäckebo, mainly over a farm, causing no injuries, and the valuable wreckage was exchanged with Britain by the Swedes for Supermarine Spitfires.

On 31 July 1944, experts at the Royal Aircraft Establishment at Farnborough in Hampshire, England, began an attempt to reconstruct the missile. U.S. military scientists subsequently received some of the recovered parts from the British. The American rocket pioneer Robert H. Goddard examined those components as part of his work aiding the U.S. military, and Goddard is reported to have inferred that his brainchild had been turned into a weapon.

=== Soviet bombings of Sweden ===
The Soviet Union dropped more than a hundred bombs on Swedish cities and villages during World War II, though no one was killed in these strikes. The first time on 14 January 1940, when Soviet aircraft attacked Swedish airspace and dropped about 10 bombs in northern Sweden, close to the port of Luleå. On their return flight, the three DB-3 aircraft ran out of fuel and were forced to land in Finland, where they were captured by Finnish troops. On 21 February, seven Soviet bomber planes appeared in the village Pajala, 10 kilometres from the border to Finland. Pajala was hit by more than 130 bombs, causing damage to local buildings. A bomb hit the local school gym, where the Norrland Dragoon Regiment were stationed at the time, but did not detonate. There were two injuries during the bombing of Pajala.

On 22 February, Stockholm was bombed by four Soviet bombers, a 100 kg bomb destroying a newly opened theatre, injuring two Swedish soldiers. Sweden concluded that this instance was by mistake, but the Soviet Union refused to acknowledge the involvement of its bombers in the raid when requested to clarify. Though the event remains unclear, a theory developed that it was a deliberate attack in response to Sweden rejecting Soviet appeals for Vasily Sidorenko, who had been arrested for espionage, to be released.

== Humanitarian effort ==
Before the war, thousands of European Jews sought temporary refuge in Sweden, and were denied. As the war began to shift in favor of the Allies, the Swedes changed their strategy with regard to aiding the precariously situated European Jews, who up to that point had been refused refuge in Sweden. The first shift in Sweden's stance towards Jews occurred in 1942. When the Germans began their campaign of persecution against the Jews of Norway, the Swedish government accepted 900 Jewish refugees, slightly more than half of Norway's Jewish population.

In 1943, Sweden received nearly all of Denmark's 8,000 Jews (along with 9,000 Danish Christians who were seeking refuge from conditions of war). With the dissolution of the Danish government in the summer of 1943, the German authorities had decided to deport Denmark's Jewish population to concentration camps. However, the Danes successfully ferried all but 450 of the Danish Jews across the straits between Copenhagen and the Swedish mainland, across waters that were patrolled by German Schnellboots, in an unprecedented rescue effort. Once in Sweden, the Danish Jews were granted asylum and taken in by Swedish families. Many stayed in Sweden after the war. Sweden also received refugees from Finland and Norway, including some of Norway's Jews. All this, as well as the protection of Sweden's own Jewish population, was made possible by Sweden's neutrality. A daily newspaper in Sweden, the Svenska Dagbladet said that Sweden did more to assist and save Jews than any other country.

Neutrality also allowed Sweden to have physical access to Germany, which was not only useful to Swedish intelligence but to Allied intelligence as well. Employees at Asea, LM Ericsson and the Swedish Match Factory (Svenska Tändsticksfabriken) acted as couriers for the Polish resistance. King Gustav V of Sweden attempted to use his diplomatic connections with German leaders to convince them to treat Jews more humanely, as evidenced through his correspondence, although to little effect. Count Folke Bernadotte, a relative of the Swedish royal family, was able to communicate with the German government and relay information back to Sweden, as did other diplomats. He also contributed in saving 15,000 prisoners from concentration camps, as did Valdemar Langlet and the famous diplomat Raoul Wallenberg, who may have saved up to 100,000 Hungarian Jews.

== Press freedom ==
En svensk tiger, a famous World War II poster reminding Swedes to be wary of spies asking questions. Svensk can mean both Swedish and Swede while tiger could be read as either the animal or stays silent giving the poster this double meaning: A Swedish tiger and A Swede stays silent – comparable to Loose lips sink ships. The tiger's stripes are in the Swedish national colors.

The Swedish public's sentiments were widely published in the Swedish press, causing many protests from the German government and prompting the Swedish government to censor some areas of the press on a limited basis. In Sweden during this time, the press fell under the control of several authorities, despite contemporary claims that the Swedish press was free. The Swedish Government Information Board determined what military information could be released and what information should remain secret. The Swedish Press Council served as a self-regulatory body, promoting "good relations between the press and the public authorities and to serve as an instrument of self-discipline for the press". The Swedish Press Council issued warnings, both public and confidential, to those whom it considered to be abusing the freedom of the press.

The Swedish government was concerned that its neutrality might be compromised should the press become too vocal in its opinions. Both the Swedish Press Council and the Information Board issued advice such as: "As far as the received material permits, attempts should be made not to give prominence to the reports of one side at the expense of the other", or: "Headlines, whether on the billboards or in the newspapers, should be worded in such a way as to avoid favoring one side or the other", and: "Editorials and surveys as well as articles discussing military events or the military situation, should be strictly objective."

During World War II, six newspapers were de facto banned from distribution: Ture Nerman's Trots Allt!, the Nazi publication Sverige Fritt and Ny Dag, Arbetar-Tidningen, Norrskensflamman and Sydsvenska Kuriren (the last four were organs of the Communist Party of Sweden). A ban on the transport of these newspapers was imposed, since the printing of newspapers was protected in the Swedish constitution. There were indications that the bans imposed on the communist newspapers had served their political purposes by impressing the Germans, whilst at the same time not really restricting the work of the media.

== Concessions ==
=== To Nazi Germany ===
Perhaps the most important aspect of Sweden's concessions to Germany during the Second World War was the extensive export of iron ore for use in the German weapons industry, reaching ten million tons per year. As Germany's preparations for war became more apparent and the risk of another war became obvious, international interest in Swedish iron ore increased. At the time, British intelligence had estimated that German industry relied heavily on Swedish iron ore and a decrease or halt in Swedish ore exports could have a disastrous effect on Germany's military efforts. Sir Ralph Glyn, a British Member of Parliament, claimed that a cessation of Swedish iron ore exports would bring the war to an end within months. Winston Churchill himself said the following about the Swedish ore exports in an internal memo to the cabinet discussing the Norwegian trade route with shipments of Swedish iron ore.

It must be understood that an adequate supply of Swedish iron ore is vital to Germany...the effectual stoppage of the Norwegian ore supplies to Germany ranks as a major offensive operation of the war. No other measure is open to us for many months to come which gives so good a chance of abridging the waste and destruction of the conflict, or of perhaps preventing the vast slaughters which will attend the grapple of the main armies.

Given that Britain had been unable to prevent the successful invasion by Nazi Germany of both France and Norway, the Swedish government was not convinced that the British could protect them and opted to continue exports. The iron ore provided much needed gold bullion, food and coal from Germany. The iron ore was transported by sea from the Norwegian town of Narvik and from Luleå in northern Sweden. These shipments were subject to attacks from British aircraft and submarines in the Atlantic and North Sea and by Soviet submarines in the Baltic Sea. About 70 vessels were sunk and 200 sailors killed during the war.

Responding to German appeals for volunteers to fight the Soviet Union, approximately 270 Swedes enlisted in Germany's Waffen-SS, and saw combat against Soviet troops on the Eastern Front. This was a choice made by individual Swedish citizens, contrary to Swedish government policy. Their number was small compared to occupied countries, in which officials encouraged enlisting for the Eastern Front (Norway 6,000; Denmark 6,000; France 11,000; Netherlands 20,000). Roughly 50 Swedish Waffen-SS men were killed or went missing in action. Most of the veterans were classified as security risks and spied on by Swedish intelligence for the rest of their lives. Security Police's archives showed that some of the men were implicated as direct participants in the killings of Jews. No Swedes stood trial for serving in the Waffen-SS, albeit some of them were prosecuted for espionage or desertion.

With a blockade of the Skagerrak straits between Norway and the northern tip of Denmark, the Swedish merchant navy found itself physically divided. The vessels that were inside the Baltic Sea traded goods with Germany during the war, whilst the greater number of vessels was leased to the Allies for convoy shipping. Approximately 1,500 Swedish sailors perished during the war, mostly victims of mines and U-boat attacks. German merchant raiders, too, would stop and capture or destroy Swedish vessels carrying cargoes for allies. For example, this was the fate of MVs Trolleholm and Sir Ernest Cassel, both destroyed by the German auxiliary cruiser Thor; the same Thor also accidentally collided with HM Bothnia in the fog while carrying cargoes for Germany causing it to sink. In the meantime, other German merchant raiders would masquerade as Swedish merchant vessels.

=== To the Allies ===
Sweden made efforts to help the Allied Forces. From May 1940, a large part of the Swedish merchant navy that found itself outside the Baltic Sea region, totalling about 8,000 seamen, was leased to Britain. 300 Swedes traveled to Norway to fight the German invasion. German telegraph traffic to occupied Oslo went through Swedish-leased cables which the Swedes intercepted. The traffic was encrypted with Germany's Geheimschreiber device, but the cypher code was broken by Swedish mathematics professor Arne Beurling in early summer 1940 and the results from this espionage were sent to the Allies through the Polish resistance movement. When the German battleship Bismarck embarked on her voyage to attack the Atlantic convoys, Swedish intelligence informed the British of her departure from port. Swedish businessmen and diplomats were also actively spying for the Allies, in Berlin and in the occupied territories.

In 1945, as the Allies were planning to liberate Denmark and Norway, the United States wanted Sweden to co-operate in this action. Sweden began preparing for Operation Rädda Danmark (Operation Save Denmark), in which Sweden was to invade Zealand from Scania. After Denmark had been liberated, Sweden was to assist the Allies in the invasion of Norway. This proved to be unnecessary, but US planes were allowed to use Swedish military bases during the liberation of Norway, from spring 1944 to 1945, and the Allies were also collaborating with the Swedish Military Intelligence and Security Service. Sweden allowed Allied spies to listen to German radio signals from a station on Öland. A radio beacon was also established in Malmö for the British military to guide bombing of Germany. Additionally, from 1943 onward, Norwegian and Danish soldiers (den danske Brigade) were trained at Swedish military bases. Sweden had also set up a series of training camps along the Norwegian border for the Norwegian resistance movement. Toward the end of the war Swedish intelligence cooperated with US air transport in relief efforts directed toward areas liberated by the Red Army.

== Aftermath ==
The Prime Minister of the United Kingdom during World War II, Winston Churchill, accused Sweden of ignoring the greater moral issues and playing both sides for profit during the conflict, including its supply of steel and machine parts to Nazi Germany throughout the war. Such claims, however, use a different definition of the word "neutral" from that defined in the 1907 Hague convention, which set out the rights and duties of belligerents and neutral countries.

=== Forced refoulement to the Soviet Union ===
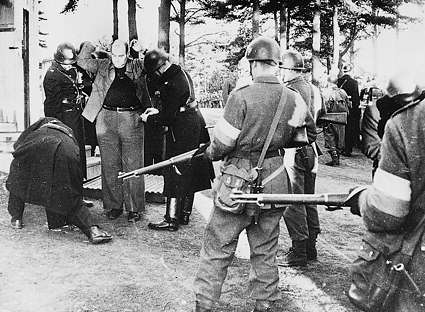
Baltic and German soldiers being extradited from a prison camp in Eksjö

In January 1946, Sweden forcibly transferred to the Soviet Union over 146 Baltic Waffen-SS and 2,364 German soldiers who had been interned in Swedish prison camps. At least seven of the internees committed suicide at their camp in the village of Rinkaby, rather than allow themselves to be handed over to the Soviet Union.

In 1970, film director Johan Bergenstråhle made a documentary, Baltutlämningen (English title: A Baltic Tragedy), about the Latvian soldiers who were given to the Soviets to be sentenced to hard labor in prison camps.

== Relations with Japan ==
Sweden and Japan maintained diplomatic relations throughout the Second World War. Sweden, as a neutral state, acted as a protecting power in Tokyo, representing the interests of Allied countries that could not maintain embassies in Japan. Sweden’s diplomatic channels also made it possible to carry out humanitarian work, including Red Cross prisoner-of-war activities.

Transport links by rail were cut after the commencement of Operation Barbarossa, with limited trade maintained through submarines and blockade running.

Towards the end of the war, Swedish ambassador Widar Bagge conveyed a secret peace proposal from Japanese Foreign Minister Mamoru Shigemitsu proposing a cessation of hostilities, however the allies did not respond to the proposal.

== See also ==
- Diplomatic history of World War II
- Military equipment of Sweden during World War II
- Neutral powers during World War II
- Nordische Gesellschaft
- Skirmish at Sövde
- Airbattle over Simrishamn
- German-Swedish Lapland skirmishes
- Sinking of SS C.F. Liljevalch
