= Slottsparken =

Slottsparken (Swedish or Norwegian for the Palace Park or the Castle Park) may refer to

- Palace Park, a public park surrounding the Royal Palace, Oslo, Norway
- Slottsparken, Malmö or Kungsparken, Malmö
- Slottsparken, Örebro, a park located on a small island east of Örebro Castle
- Slottsparken, Växjö, a park surrounding Teleborg Castle, Växjö
