= Søvde =

Søvde may refer to:

- Søvde, an old name for Sauda Municipality in Rogaland county, Norway
- Søvde, an old name for Syvde Municipality in Møre og Romsdal county, Norway

== See also ==
- Sövde
