= Sinking of SS C.F. Liljevalch =

Sinking of Swedish steamboat

The Sinking of SS C.F. Liljevalch
- Part of World War II
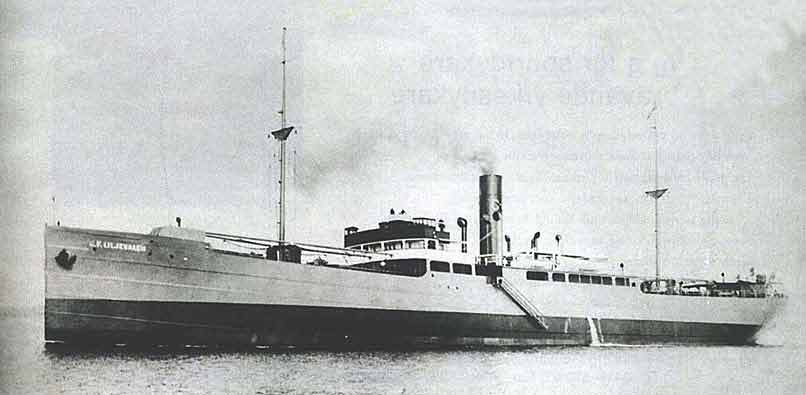
- The Swedish ship C.F. Liljevalch
- Date: 18 August 1942
- Location: Västervik, Sweden
- Outcome: C.F. Liljevalch torpedoed and sunk
- Deaths: 33

The sinking of SS C.F. Liljevalch on 18 August 1942, occurred when the Swedish steamship was torpedoed off the coast of Västervik, Sweden, by the Soviet submarine L-3. The attack resulted in the loss of 33 lives, with only seven survivors.

== C.F. Liljevalch ==
The ship was built in 1920 at Götaverken as the shipyard's 354th ship and the first in a series of ten ships, which in the early 1920s was delivered to Trafikab. The ship's port of registration was Stockholm, and the ship was launched on 12 June, just some months before its arrival in the capital city. C.F. Liljevalch is also known to have been out on water during severe storms and hurricanes and still managed to survive the harsh weather conditions. After the German occupation of Norway in early 1940, the steamer sailed in ore traffic inside the Skagerrak barrier for the last time under the command of Captain Bramford.

== Torpedoing ==
In mid 1942, foreign submarines frequently operated between the northern tip of Öland and Landsort, posing a constant threat to merchant vessels. To counter this danger, Swedish naval forces provided protection, at this time consisting of three destroyers and a patrol boat. On 18 August, a convoy of sixteen ships from Sweden, Germany, Finland, and the Netherlands made its way south under escort. As they passed Kungsgrundet at 15:18, the lead vessel, C.F. Liljevalch, was struck by a torpedo. Almost immediately, a second torpedo followed, and a boiler explosion is believed to have occurred at the same time. The ship vanished in seconds, leaving behind a chaotic scene of debris, water, and ore raining back down onto the surface. Survivors later estimated that the ship took no more than 30 to 35 seconds to disappear beneath the waves.

Moments before the attack, the captain had stepped away to the saloon for tea, while the second officer, the pilot, and the helmsman remained stationed on the bridge. As soon as the ship was hit, the convoy came to a halt, and the escorting naval vessels released a smoke screen before initiating a counterattack. Around 40 depth charges were dropped in an attempt to eliminate the submarine responsible for the attack. Meanwhile, nearby merchant ships, including Hermod from Stockholm, Flora from Helsingborg, and Borbeck from Bremen, launched their lifeboats and managed to rescue seven survivors, among them the second officer, a few crew members, and the ship's cook and steward.

At the time, the attack on C.F. Liljevalch was the deadliest disaster to strike the Swedish merchant fleet in the Baltic Sea. By then, four ships in these waters had fallen victim to foreign submarines, resulting in the loss of 69 lives.

The wreck of C.F. Liljevalch now rests at a depth of about 70 metres (230 ft), approximately one nautical mile (1.9 km; 1.2 mi) from the location where another ship from the same company, MS Luleå, had been torpedoed under similar circumstances just a month earlier.

== See also ==
- Swedish iron-ore industry during World War II
- Airbattle over Simrishamn
- Skirmish at Sövde
- German-Swedish skirmishes in Lapland
