= Airbattle over Simrishamn =

The Airbattle over Simrishamn
- Part of World War II
Date	3 April 1945
Location	Simrishamn, Sweden
Result	Swedish victory
Territorial changes	German retreat from Swedish airspace

Belligerents
Sweden	Germany

Units involved
Reggiane Re.2000	Dornier Do 24

Strength
2 fighter pilots	1 fighter pilot

Casualties and losses
1 killed	None

The Airbattle over Simrishamn, or Airbattle of Simrishamn (3 April 1945) was an aerial incident that occurred during World War II where a Swedish fighter pilot, named Harry Nordlund, went down in an attempt to repel a German aircraft violating Swedish territory. The German three-engined Dornier with three machine guns ended up retreating after another Swedish pilot, Sven Brise, showed up and repelled it from Swedish airspace.

== Prelude ==
On the 2 April 1945, as Nordlund was out on patrol, he came across a German plane, flying over Sweden violating its airspace. Nordlund tried to repel the Germans from Swedish airspace, which led to a heated aerial battle between the two aircraft. The incident happened just a few weeks before the war eventually ended.

== Shelling ==
When the German aircraft noticed the Swedish aircraft attempting to repel it from the Swedish airspace, the battle broke out. The German Dornier started firing shots at Nordlund's aircraft and his plane engine eventually caught fire. Nordlund did not have enough time to manage to jump out of the plane, the aircraft eventually exploded, and Nordlund died with it. Nordlund's second in command, Sven Brise, was too late to witness what had happened, but afterwards he managed to repel the German intruder. It was only when he had returned to his airfield that he understood what had happened to his comrade. Harry Nordlund is known for being the first Swede ever dying in air combat over Swedish territory, and his intervention was for the protection of Swedish neutrality.

== See also ==
- Skirmish at Sövde - an aerial incident between Sweden, a German and an American plane.
- German-Swedish skirmishes in Lapland - a series of confrontations between the Swedish and German militaries during World War II.
- Sinking of SS C.F. Liljevalch - a torpedoing by the Soviets of a Swedish steamboat near Västervik.
