= Skåne Line =

Swedish fortification system in WWII

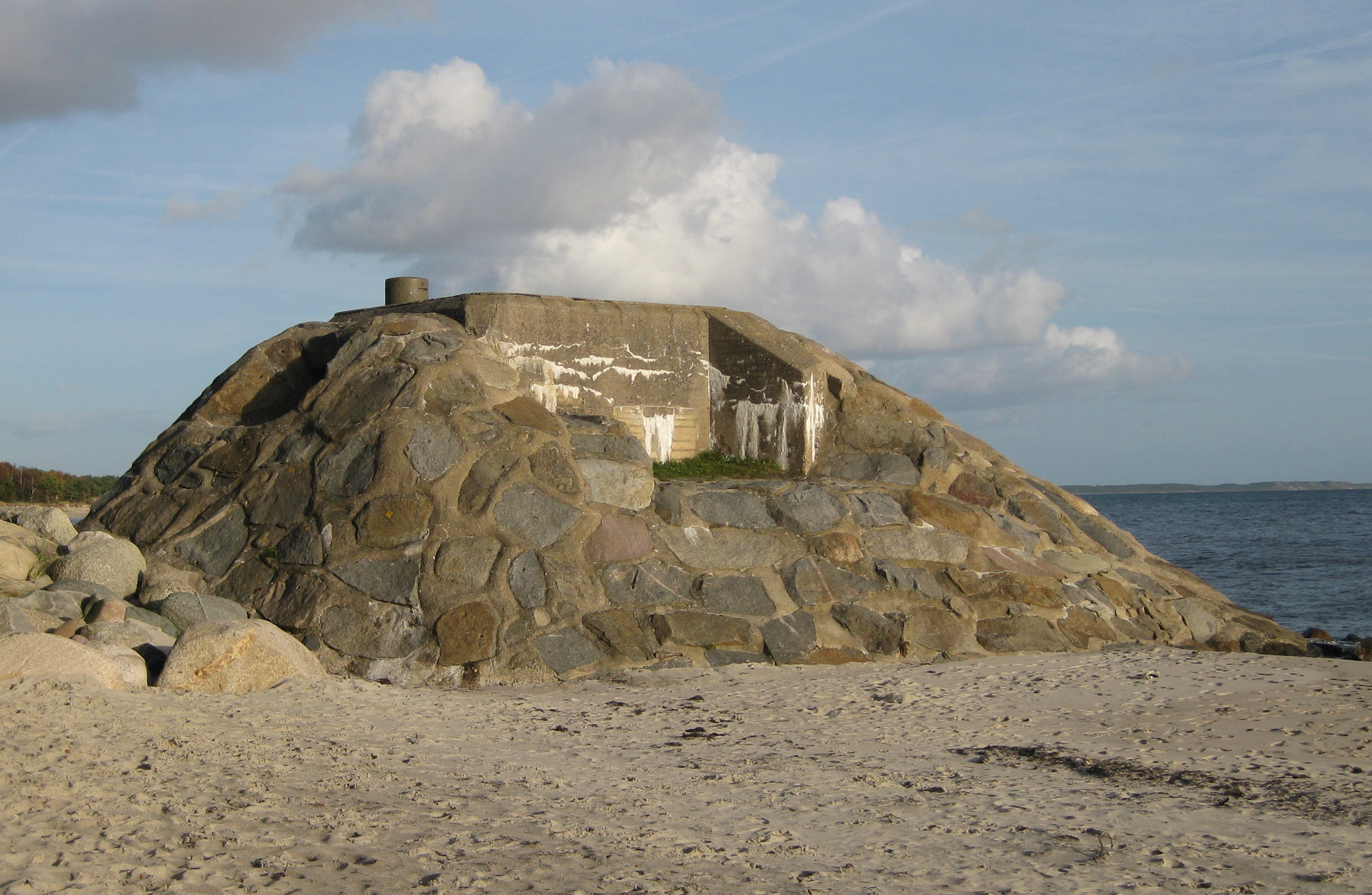
Sealed bunker east of Ystad

The Skåne Line (Swedish: Skånelinjen), popularly known as the Per Albin Line (Swedish: Per Albin-linjen) after then-Prime Minister Per Albin Hansson, was a 500 kilometer long line of light fortifications erected during World War II around the coast of southern Sweden to protect the country from a possible German or Soviet invasion. It stretched from Halland across Scania to Blekinge and consisted of two defensive lines:

- First defensive line: concrete bunkers along the shore, armed with machine guns and light cannons.
- Second defensive line: armed troops 300 meters inland behind barbed wire, some in concrete bunkers.

In the Helsingborg area the line was reinforced with a second line of rear-facing machine gun bunkers. As a further improvement there was also added a line of shelters to protect personnel from aerial bombing and artillery bombardment. There were two types of shelter designs (called SK24 and SK48), designed to provide protection for either 24 or 48 soldiers. This line stretches from Ystad to the north of Helsingborg, and consists of about 70 shelters.

At the end of the war in 1945 the defensive line consisted of 1,063 fortifications (shelters not included). The distances between each was 300–400 meters and most of them were located in direct proximity to the sea, built according to a number of standardised designs. During the Cold War the line was strengthened further, adding turrets armed with 75mm tank guns, either as additions to already existing fortifications or in newly constructed ones.

The decommissioning of the defences began in the late 1990s. Each landowner had to decide what would happen with the military fortifications on their property. Many bunkers were sealed, a small number were razed. The liquidation is still (2008) not fully implemented and several stretches along the south coast remain. The "liquidation" referred to here is not the physical removal of the reinforced concrete found everywhere along the coast of Scania, but the emptying of the bunkers and shelters of all military equipment. For instance, only a few of the bunkers have been demolished, to make way for housing. Today the forts are used primarily as artificial rocks for sunbathers in the summer.

In 2008 it was decided that 18 of the fortifications in the Helsingborg area would be preserved as historical landmarks. These bunkers are now managed by the Military Preparedness Museum (Beredskapsmuseet) and are undergoing extensive renovation. Starting in 2009, the bunkers were opened to the public. The refurbished bunkers were officially inaugurated on May 30, 2009 with battle demonstrations, the firing of salutes, fanfares and color guard processions.

== See also ==
- Swedish Armed Forces
- Sweden during World War II
- Scandinavian defence union
