= HSwMS Hvalen =

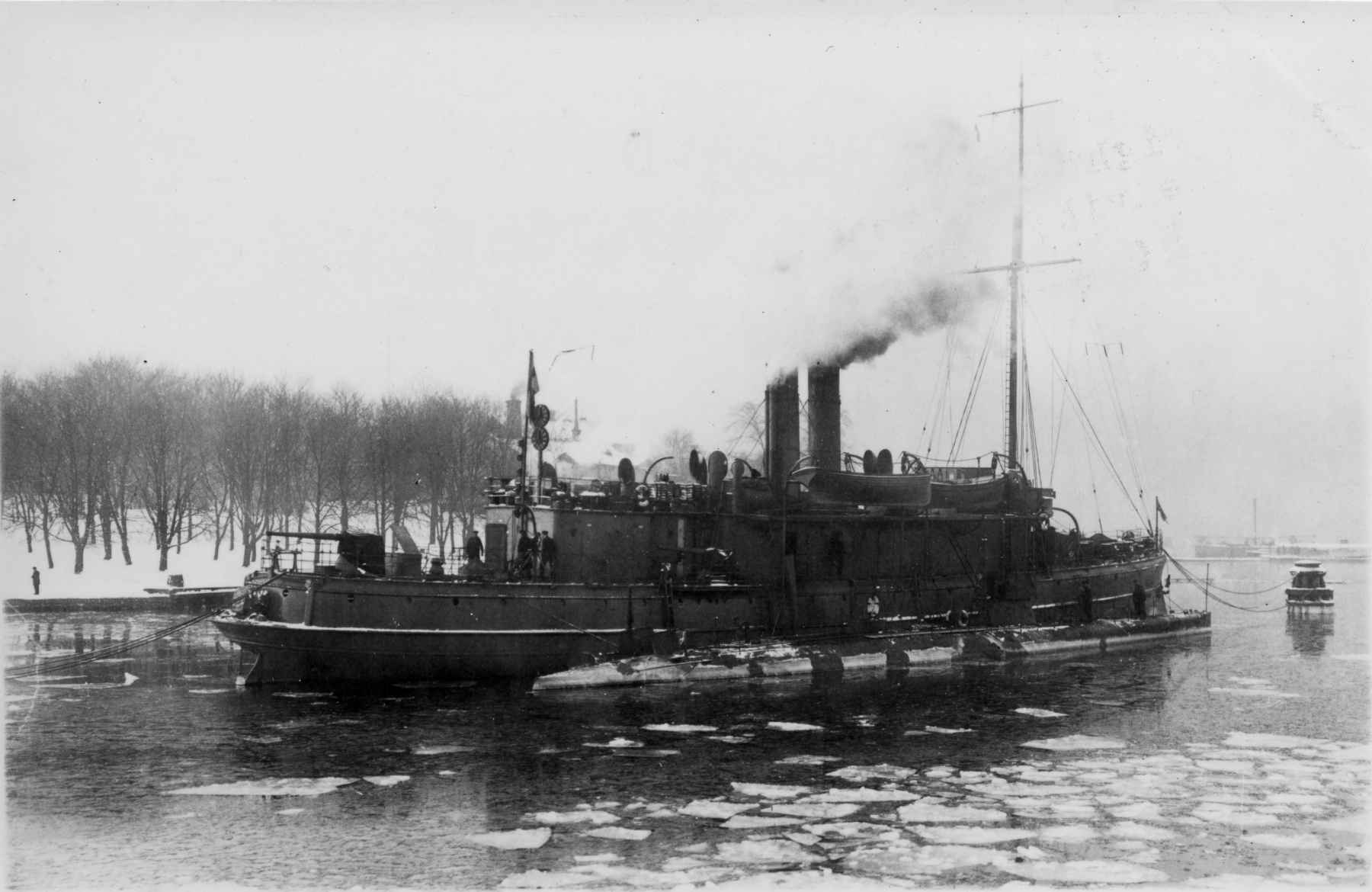
- HSwMS Hvalen

History

Sweden
- Name: Hvalen
- Builder: Fiat-San Giorgio, La Spezia Italy
- Launched: 16 February 1909
- Commissioned: 1909
- Decommissioned: 1919
- Fate: Expended as a target 1924

General characteristics
- Class & type: Foca Class
- Displacement: 187 long tons (190 t) surfaced; 230 long tons (230 t) submerged
- Length: 42.4 m (139 ft 1 in)
- Beam: 4.3 m (14 ft 1 in)
- Draught: 2.7 m (8 ft 10 in)
- Propulsion: 3 × petrol engines, 750 hp (560 kW); 1× electric motor, 150 hp (110 kW)
- Speed: 14.8 knots (27.4 km/h; 17.0 mph) surfaced, 6.3 knots (11.7 km/h; 7.2 mph) submerged
- Test depth: 30 m
- Complement: 17
- Armament: 2 x 45.7 cm torpedo tubes

HSwMS Hvalen was a submarine of the Swedish Navy. Constructed in Italy, the submarine sailed the entire way to Sweden for her commissioning unaccompanied. In October 1915 she became involved in a diplomatic incident between neutral Sweden, and Germany, which was then engaged in fighting Britain in the First World War. Following a series of sinkings of German cargo ships and naval vessels in the Baltic Sea by British submarines entering the Baltic through the (Swedish-controlled) Öresund straits, a German warship opened fire on Hvalen killing a crew-member. According to the captain of the Hvalen, she was flying the Swedish naval flag and in Swedish home waters at the time she was fired on. Compensation was later paid to the widow of the crew-member and an apology was issued.

== See also ==
- Hvalen incident
