= Bombings of Malmö and Lund =

World War II bombings of Swedish cities

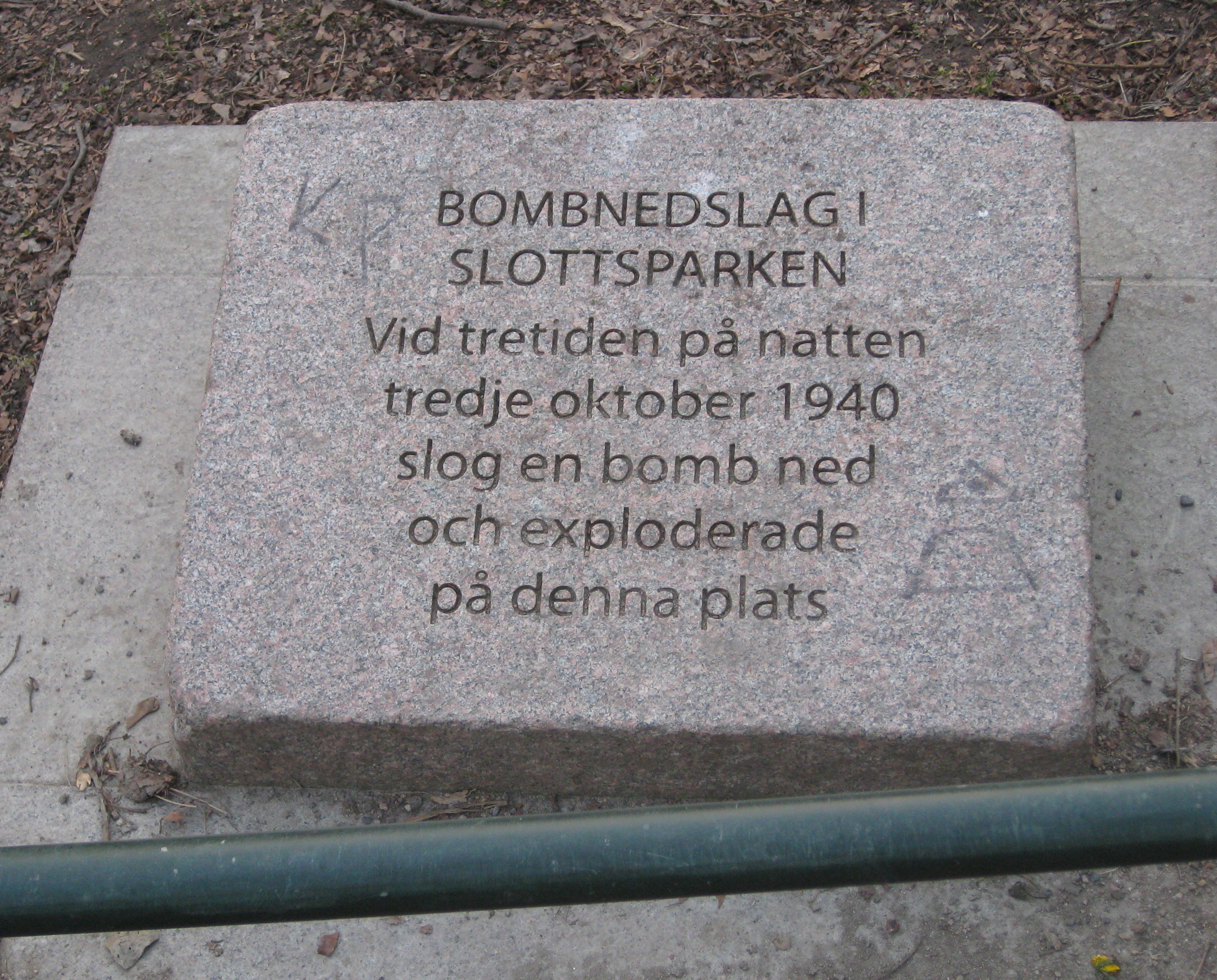
2005 memorial plaque in Slottsparken commemorating the bombing of Malmö

During World War II, the Royal Air Force accidentally bombed the Swedish cities of Malmö and Lund in 1940 and 1943 respectively. Nobody was killed or injured in the bombings, though a few buildings were damaged or destroyed.

== Bombing of Malmö ==
On the early morning of 3 October 1940, three bombs were accidentally dropped over Malmö, Sweden by a Whitley bomber of the Royal Air Force (RAF) piloted by George M. Roscoe. The first two bombs were dropped on Slottsparken while the third ended up in the moat of Malmö Castle. Nobody was killed or injured, but several buildings suffered minor damage. The British government initially claimed to have been uninvolved with the incident, but when Swedish authorities presented evidence the bombs were dropped from RAF aircraft, Britain acknowledged its involvement and clarified that the bomber was part of a bombing raid against Stettin in Nazi Germany and had got lost.

== Bombing of Lund ==
On 18 November 1943, RAF aircraft accidentally dropped approximately 50 bombs over Lund. Two bombs struck a Sydkraft electrical transformer station in the city, and in the outskirts of Lund a bomb created a large crater when it landed. Thousands of windows were shattered and several greenhouses were destroyed, but nobody was killed or injured.

== Commemoration ==
On 19 April 2005, the bombing of Malmö was commemorated with the unveiling of a plaque in Slottsparken at the site where one of the first two bombs had landed. Sten Runerheim, the former chief prosecutor of Malmö who had been in Slottsparken during the bombing, attended the commemoration. In an interview with Sydsvenskan, Runerheim, who took care of British and American pilots who made emergency landings in Sweden during the war, noted that he had befriended Roscoe during a visit to Midhurst, West Sussex in c. 1965.
