= Soviet bombing of Stockholm and Strängnäs in 1944 =

Military incident in 1944

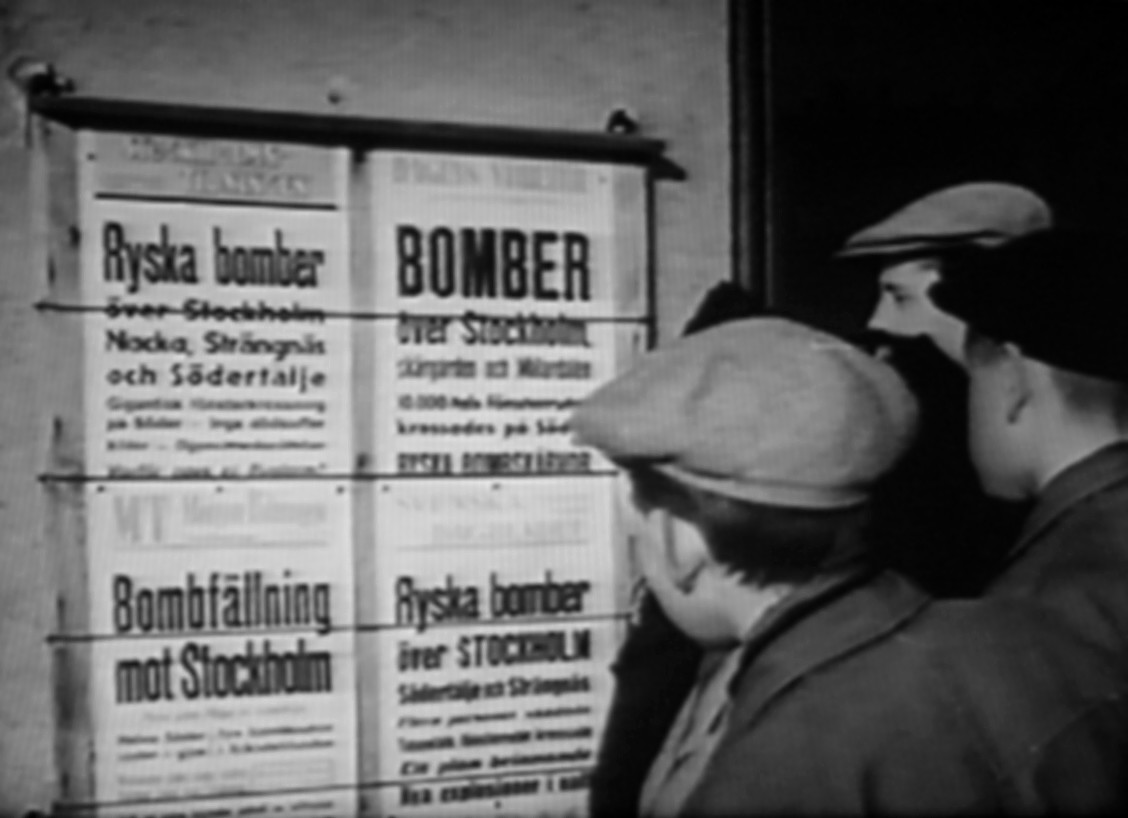
Headlines on February 23, 1944

The Soviet Bombings of Stockholm and Strängnäs in 1944 were a military incident where Soviet aircraft bombed several locations in Stockholm and eastern Sweden during the night of February 22–23, 1944. Bombs were dropped on Blidö and Svartlöga in the northern Stockholm archipelago, near Stavsnäs and Järla, at Eriksdal in Södermalm, as well as in Strängnäs and Pershagen near Södertälje.

== Background ==
At the Tehran Conference on November 28, 1943, Churchill, Roosevelt, and Stalin aimed to pressure Hungary, Bulgaria, Romania, and Finland to disengage from fighting on Germany's side. As part of this pressure, the Soviets initiated a bombing offensive against Finnish territory in winter 1944. On February 22, Soviet bombers believed to have been targeting Turku, Finland, due to navigation issues, strayed into Swedish airspace, bombing Stockholm and Strängnäs.

== Bombings ==
In Stockholm, the bombings caused significant damage to infrastructure and injured civilians. At Eriksdal, a 100 kg bomb hit the outdoor theater, destroying the stage and causing a crater 3 meters deep and 5–6 meters in diameter. Three smaller bombs exploded nearby, shattering numerous windows in the surrounding area and injuring bystanders. Additionally, a large number of windows were shattered around the intersection of Ringvägen – Götgatan and along some smaller streets in the area, also on the other side of Skanstullsbron. A waitress was slightly injured by glass splinters, and a man was knocked down by the blast wave and broke his shoulder.

In Strängnäs, bombs fell near the Södermanland Armored Regiment, damaging buildings and injuring soldiers. After ten minutes of circling at high altitude, a larger explosive bomb was dropped in a dive, hitting 50–60 meters from the southern barracks, and five smaller explosive bombs, one of which was a dud, landed in the ice north of the regiment. At the same time, three flare bombs were dropped, two of which did not develop before landing. The third illuminated the entire city. Later, additional bomb craters were found, including on Tosterön. A total of 10 explosive and three flare bombs were dropped in and around Strängnäs. Two soldiers at the regiment were injured by shrapnel.

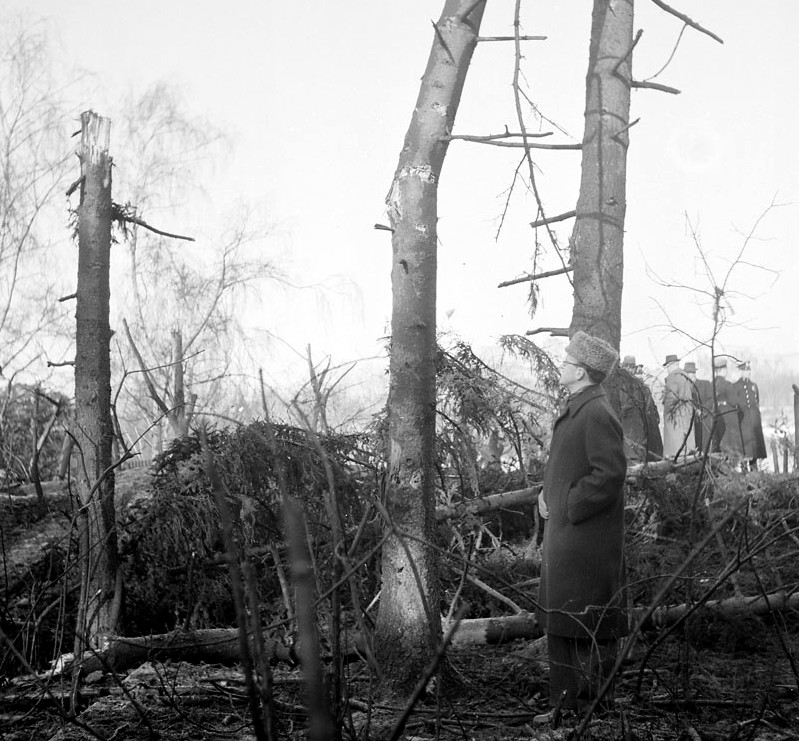
From the Russian bombing over Eriksdal area, February 22, 1944. Photo: Lennart af Petersens

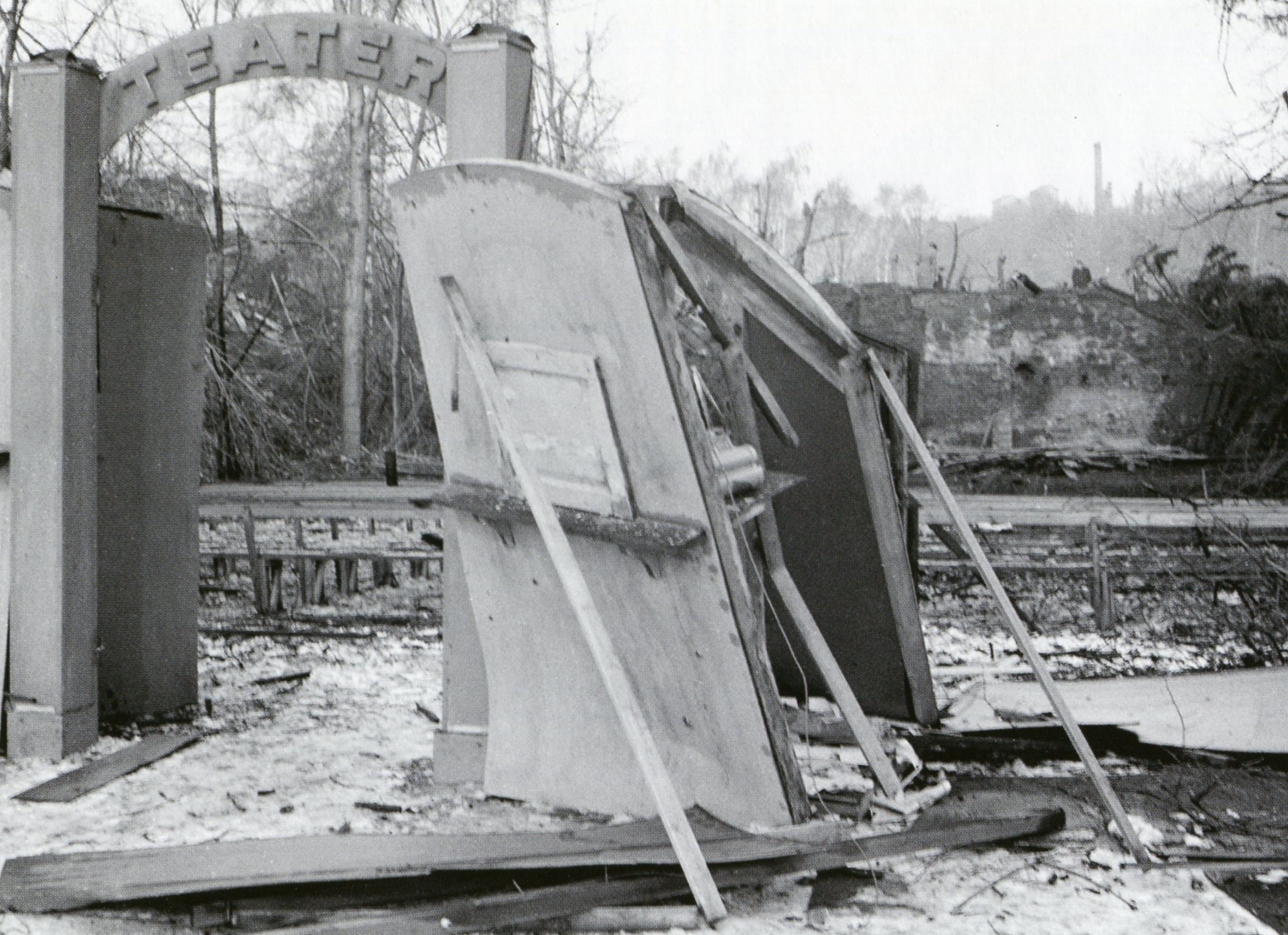
Eriksdalsteatern's remnants after the bombing on February 22, 1944.

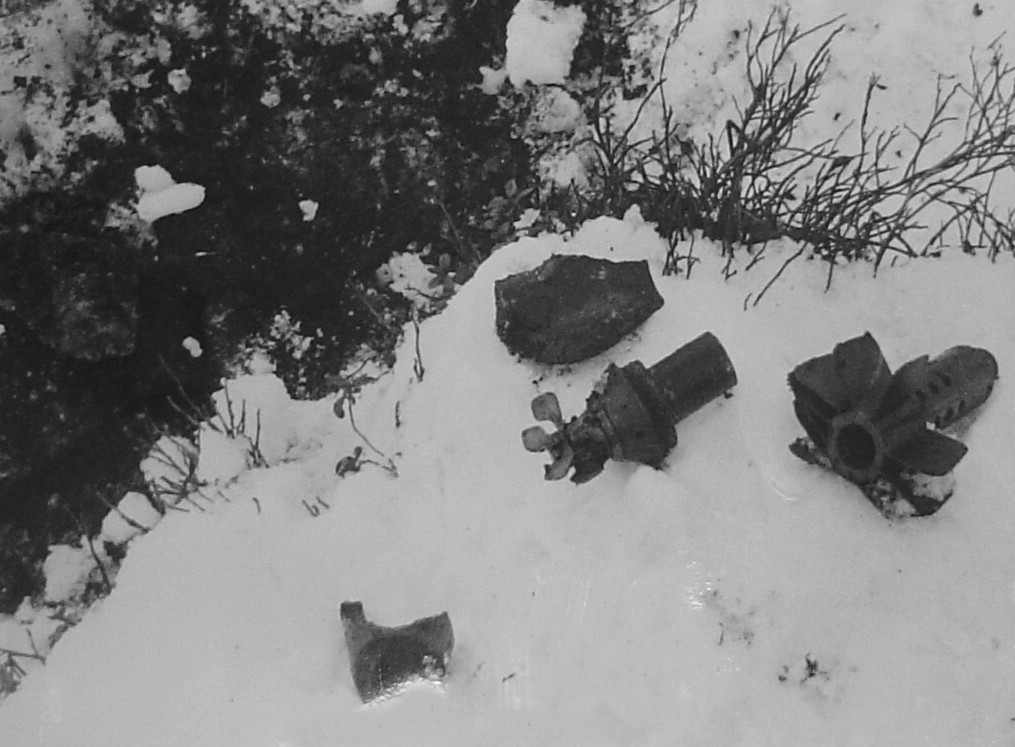
Found bomb splinters at Lillsjön in Nacka.

== Cause ==
The incident raised speculation whether it was accidental or a deliberate provocation and warning. Some attribute the bombings to navigational errors during a Soviet bombing offensive against Finland, while others view them as a deliberate attempt to pressure Finland and warn Sweden against supporting Finland. The Soviet denial of involvement further complicates the narrative. A theory developed that it was a deliberate attack in response to Sweden rejecting Soviet appeals for Vasily Sidorenko, who had been arrested for espionage in September 1942, to be released. The former Head of "Soviet Tourist Agency" (espionage) Viktor Starostin had a diplomatic license and could not be imprisoned, so he was declared personae non gratae and expelled in October 1941. His replacement was Sidorenko who did not have a diplomatic license, and was sentenced to ten years of hard labor in December 1942. Sidorenko was released in late February 1944 and left for Great Britain, a week after the bombings.

== See also ==
- Bombings of Malmö and Lund
- Soviet bombing of Pajala
- SS Hansa disaster
- Timeline of Sweden during World War II
