= Sövde =

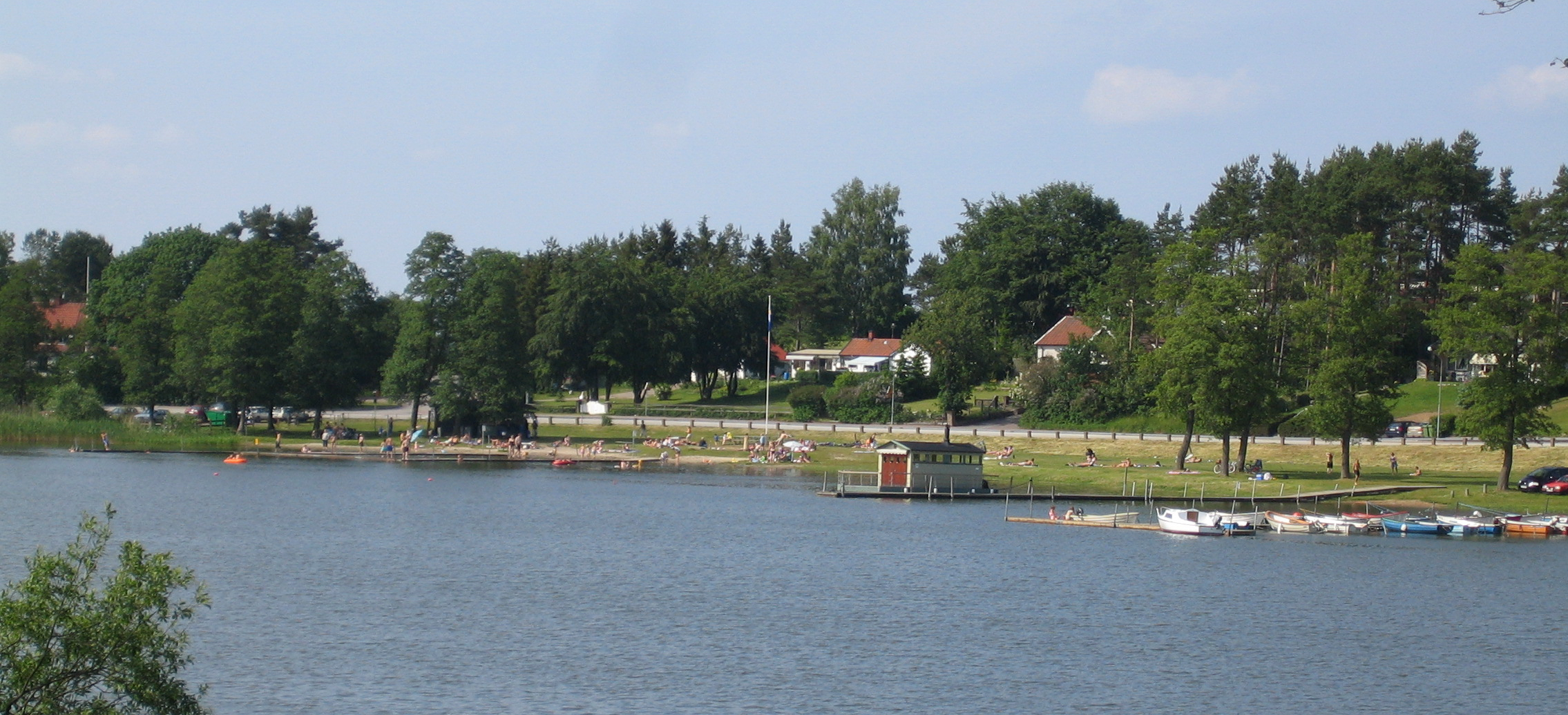

- Location within Skåne Location within Sweden
- Coordinates: 55°35′N 13°40′E
- Country: Sweden
- Province: Skåne
- County: Skåne County
- Municipality: Sjöbo Municipality

Area
  - Total: 0.35 km^{2} (0.14 sq mi)

Population (31 December 2020)
  - Total: 369
  - Density: 838/km^{2} (2,170/sq mi)
- Time zone: UTC+1 (CET)
  - Summer (DST): UTC+2 (CEST)

Sövde is a locality situated in Sjöbo Municipality, Skåne County, Sweden with 369 inhabitants in 2020.

== See also ==
- Skirmish at Sövde
