= Kungsparken, Malmö =

Park in Malmö, Sweden

Coordinates: 55.603181°N 12.991757°E

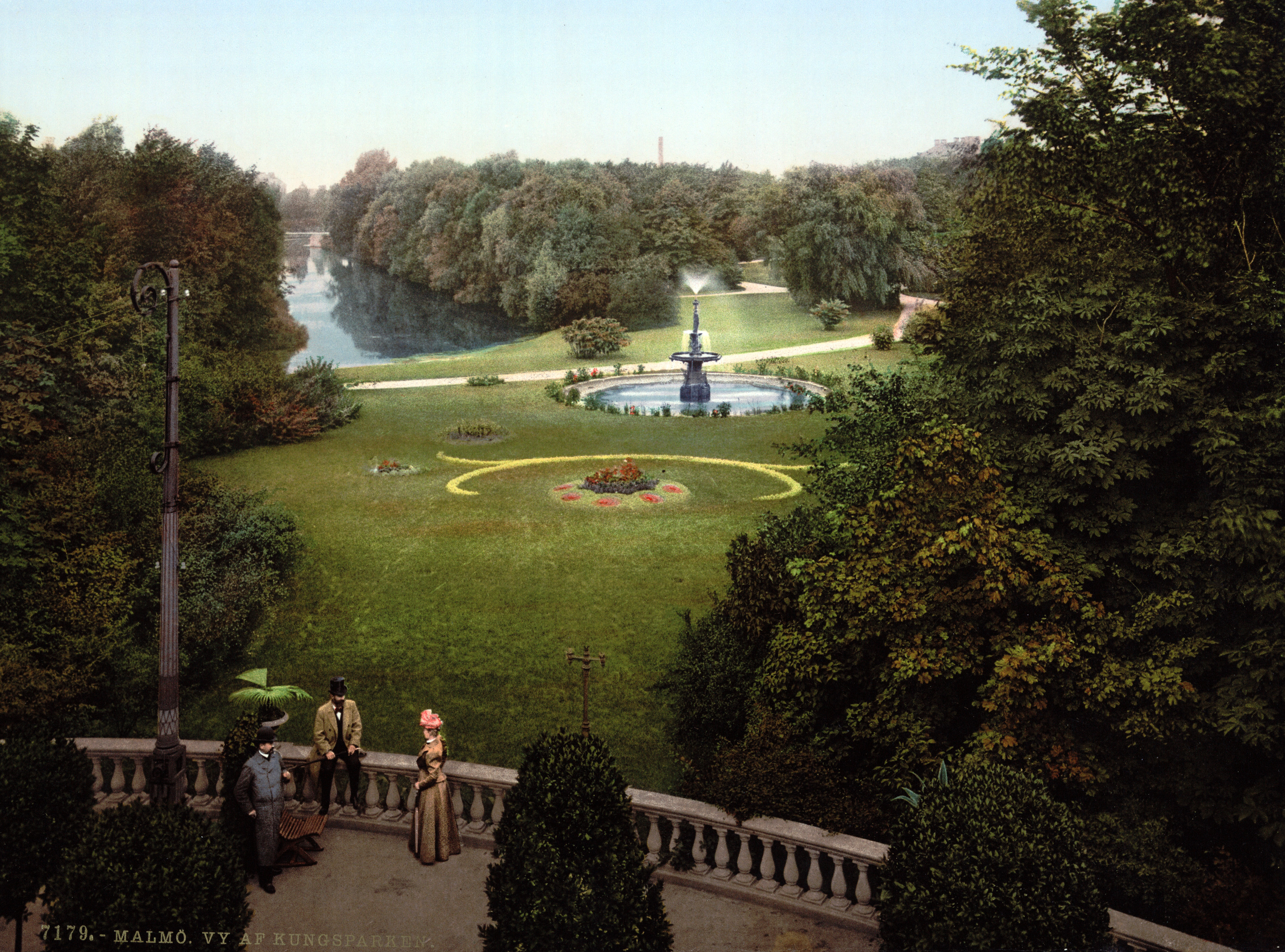

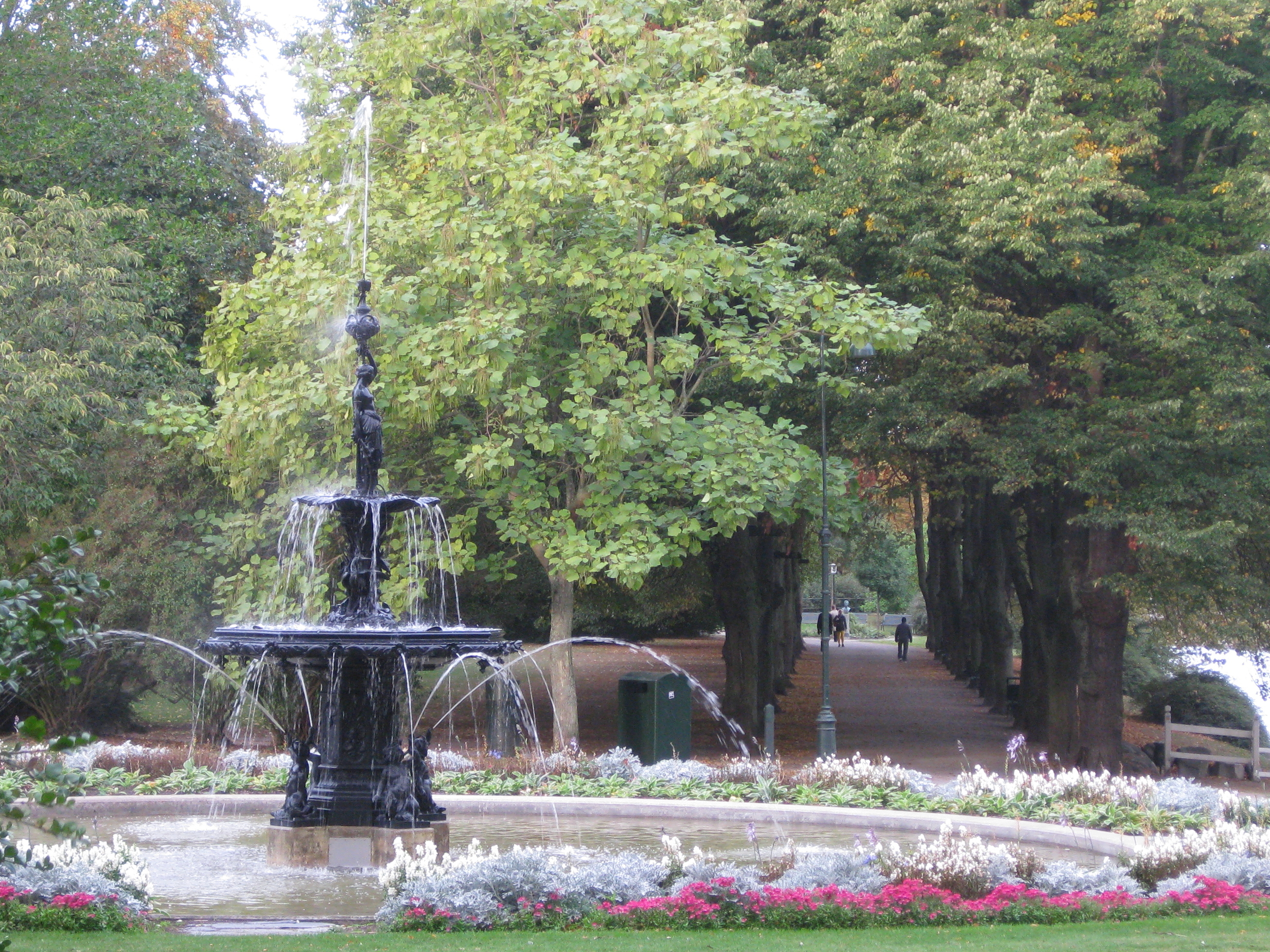

Kungsparken is a park in Malmö, Sweden. It is located in the centre of the city just west of the Malmö City Hall and Malmö District Court and surrounds Malmöhus Castle. Up until 1881 it was known as Slottsparken. Because of this and their close proximity, it is sometimes confused with the nearby Slottsparken on maps, which was established in 1897.
