= Sydsvenska Kuriren =

Defunct Swedish communist newspaper

Sydsvenska Kuriren ('South Swedish Courier') was a communist newspaper in Sweden. The publication was an organ of the Communist Party of Sweden. The first issue appearedon October 24, 1925. Sydsvenska Kurirern was launched in the fall of 1925, as an edition of Kalmar Läns-Kuriren. It was published on Wednesdays and Saturdays. The newspaper was edited and printed in Oskarshamn. Edvin E. Persson was the editor of the newspaper during this period.

Sydsvenska Kuriren was separated from Kalmar Läns-Kuriren in late 1931. The editorial office of the newspaper was moved to Kristianstad in 1931, to were the printing also shifted. Knut Bäckström was the editor of the newspaper during this period. In January 1932 the newspaper began to appear thrice weekly, on Tuesdays, Thursdays and Saturdays. As of 1932, it had a circulation of 4,500.

In the summer of 1933, the newspaper moved to Malmö.

Sydsvenska Kuriren was one of six newspapers (and one of four communist newspapers) that was subject to a 'transport ban' during the Second World War. The 'transport ban', based on a law in place between 1940 and 1944, meant amongst other things that the newspaper could not be transported through the postal services, railways or other forms of public transport. In April 1940 the newspaper again became a twice-weekly, published on Wednesdays and Saturdays. The last issue of Sydsvenska Kuriren was published on March 28, 1942. Edvin E. Persson had returned as editor of Sydsvenska Kuriren during the latter period.
