= Skirmish at Sövde =

1944 military conflict in Sweden

- Part of World War II
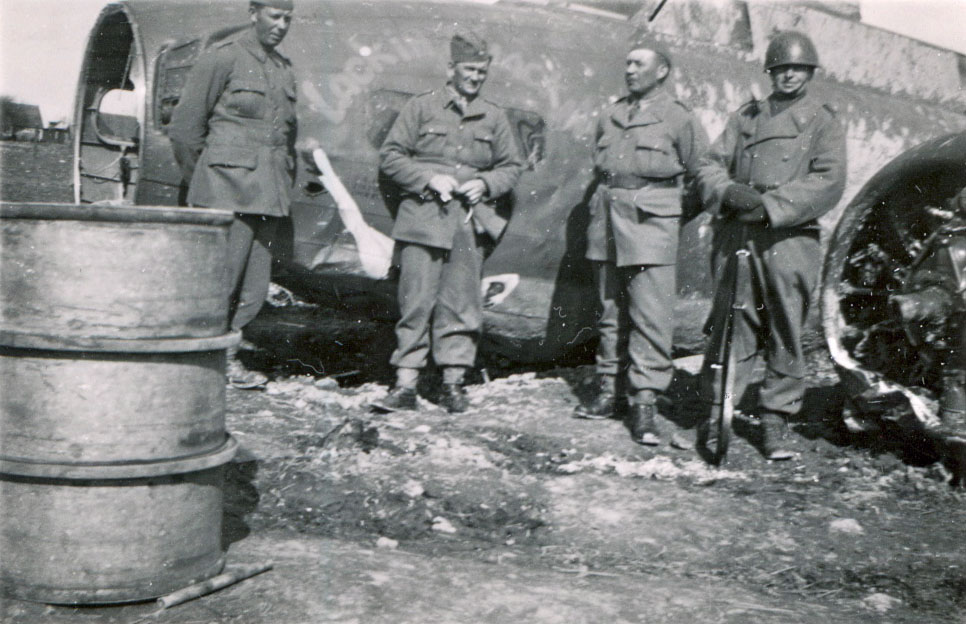
- Swedes standing in front of an American plane that crashed near Sövde.
| Date | 11 April 1944 |
| Location | Sövde, Sweden |
| Result | Swedish victory |

Belligerents
| Germany United States | Sweden |

Commanders and leaders
| Frank Ammann | Unknown |

Casualties and losses
| Germany: 1 Messerschmitt Me 410; 2 crew killed United States: 1 Boeing B-17G Flying Fortress; 1 crew injured | 1 soldier killed |

The skirmish at Sövde was an aerial incident in 1944 where a German Messerschmitt Me 410 and an American Boeing B-17G Flying Fortress accidentally flew into Swedish airspace. After several warning shots, the incident evolved into a short-lived confrontation around Sövde between the Swedish air defence and the German and American planes.

== The German confrontation ==
Upon entering Swedish airspace near Simrishamn, a Luftwaffe Messerschmitt Me 410 faced numerous warning shots by Swedish anti-aircraft artillery, although the German plane would ignore the shots making the Swedes declare luftfara (air hazard) at 11:52. A Swedish motor brigade observed the Messerschmitt's movements closely; this is when the German plane started firing at the Swedes who returned fire. The German plane crashed shortly thereafter due to the Swedish anti-aircraft fire, killing both of the German crew as well as the Swedish conscript Nils Holmberg who was hit by the aircraft as it crashed. The German crew would later be revealed to be Feldwebel Josef Kaulartz and Max Schultz.

== The American confrontation ==
An hour later, a damaged USAAF Boeing B-17G Flying Fortress commanded by pilot Frank C. Ammann also entered Swedish airspace. While returning from a bombing mission to the German city of Cottbus the aircraft had been damaged by German anti-aircraft fire, forcing them to break formation and head for Sweden to make an emergency landing. However, after Swedish anti-aircraft fire, most of the crew left by parachutes to land safely on the ground. The remaining pilot Ammann crash landed the bomber at Näsby boställe.

== Aftermath ==
After the crash landing Ammann left the plane to run for a farm house, then tried return to the aircraft but was prevented to do so down by an off-duty Home Guard soldier. The Americans would be treated well by the locals, Frank Ammann would even be invited for breakfast by the Emilsson family where he would give his helmet to Caj Emilsson as a souvenir. The German pilots were buried in the local Sövde graveyard, their graves later relocated to Trelleborg in the 1970s.

The B-17 would later be confiscated and scrapped by Swedish authorities.

== See also ==
- Sweden during World War II
- Lapland skirmishes
- Luftwaffe
- Hvalen incident
