= Hvalen incident =

1915 event during World War I

- Part of World War I
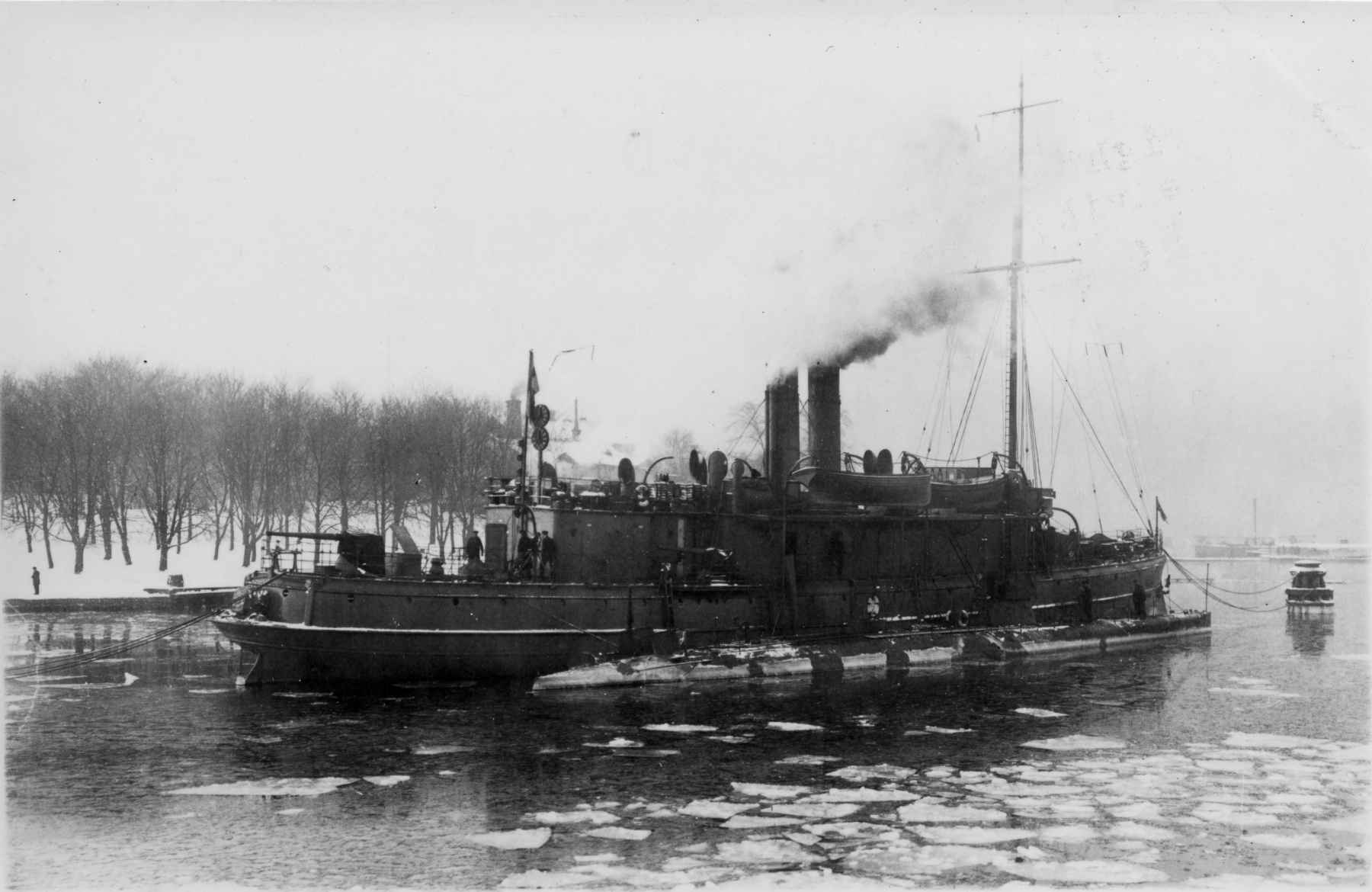
- Swedish submarine HSwMS Hvalen, pictured alongside the HMS Skäggald
Date	21 October 1915
Location	Øresund
Result	See aftermath

Belligerents
Sweden	(German Empire) Germany

Commanders and leaders
Captain B. Zander	Unknown

Units involved
HSwMS Hvalen	German merchant navy

Strength
1 submarine	3 auxiliary cruisers (one engaged)

Casualties and losses
1 sailor 1 submarine damaged	None

The Hvalen incident was a short and small-scale confrontation between the navies of Sweden and Germany as a consequence of the First World War. The Swedish submarine Hvalen would be mistook for an enemy vessel and fired upon while out on patrol, one Swedish sailor would perish as a consequence. However, the naval skirmish would not escalate any further as the powers involved would solve their problems diplomatically.

== Prelude ==
At 6:15 am on the 21 of October 1915, the Swedish submarine Hvalen departed from Ystad under captain B. Zander to patrol the waters of Øresund, she was shortly thereafter joined by the escort boat Blenda. Due to the bad weather, the two ships had drifted away from each other and were 1500 meters apart by the time they reached Cape Abbekås. Also present in Cape Abbekås were 3 German auxiliary cruisers, one of which mistook the Swedish submarine for an enemy ship.

== Incident ==
The German ship fired a light bomb towards Hvalen while it was still within Swedish territorial waters. The light bomb was met with confusion by the crew of Hvalen who thought that it was some sort of signal to the other auxiliary cruisers and therefore simply slowed down to avoid it. However, the ship continued its bombardment. Captain Zander made numerous attempts to show the cruiser that they weren't a threat but to no avail. Seeing no other option, Zander ordered Flag Officer Sellin, who was the one with the most experience serving on Hvalen, out on deck to make the Swedish flag more visible so that the attack ship would be aware that it was firing upon a neutral vessel.

While Sellin was working with the flag out on deck, the splatter from a projectile hit Sellin in the back, critically injuring him. By the time the eighth projectile had been fired, the German gunner Kreuger noted that the ship's cannon was no longer functional. The auxiliary cruiser thus decided to ram into Hvalen when bombardment was proved to no longer an option. However, while on their way to ram Hvalen, the Germans eventually spotted the Swedish flag when they had come within a couple of hundred meters of the submarine. Realizing their mistake, the German captain signaled a request to come on board Hvalen which Captain Zander declined the offer choosing to instead immediately return to Ystad while the German ship continued eastward.

== Aftermath ==
Sellin would later be pronounced dead at the local hospital at Ystad. The Swedish government strongly protested against the border violation and the damages that Germany had inflicted upon Hvalen. Germany sincerely apologized for the incident and was to in any way make up for the damages inflicted on the Swedish Navy.

In 1933 the German gunner Kreuger and the Swedish under lieutenant Hamilton would go out to dinner where they would discuss the events of that day.
