= German-Swedish skirmishes in Lapland =

1940 military confrontations

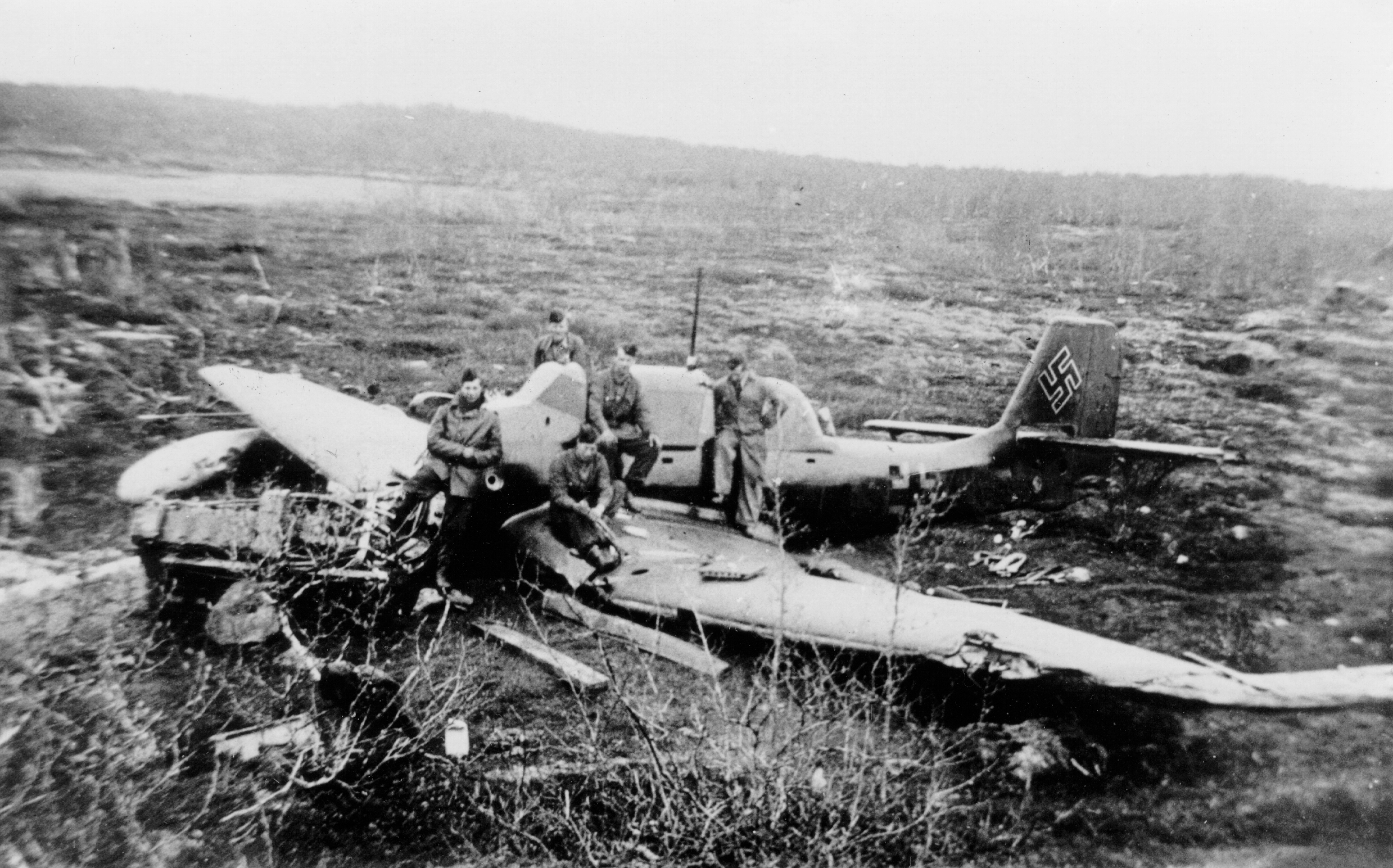
Date	May – June, 1940
Location	Norrbotten, Sweden
Result	Unconcluded; Favorable outcome for Sweden

Belligerents
Sweden; United Kingdom; Co-Belligerent: Norway	Nazi Germany

Commanders and leaders
Bo Furugård	Rudolf Mayer; Nikolaus von Falkenhorst

Strength
1 company 1 Armoured train	Unknown

Casualties and losses
1 killed	2 planes 1 plane damaged 8 killed 9 captured

The German-Swedish skirmishes in Lapland were a series of confrontations between the Swedish and German militaries. During the German invasion of Norway, the Luftwaffe would make numerous incursions into Swedish airspace, but without a serious response from the Swedes. However, after the incursion of a German Dornier Do 26 resulted in the death of the Swedish conscript-soldier Sven Sjöberg, the attitudes of the Swedish soldiers changed towards foreign aircraft in their territory and thus the rate of shot down German planes in the area increased. Hostilities ceased upon the completion of Operation Weserübung.

== Background ==
After the start of the German invasion of Norway in April 1940, there was a notable increase in the number of German warplanes invading Swedish airspace. However, despite these violations of Swedish sovereignty, the Swedish military refrained from conducting a serious response. Upon spotting a German plane, the Swedish would fire warning shots but nothing more. German incursions into northern Sweden became more frequent as the Germans moved north to secure Narvik.

== Conflict ==
=== Vassijaure incident ===
On the 20th of May 1940, a German Dornier Do 26 had made an incursion into Swedish airspace. The plane's objective was to reach Narvik to join its companions fighting in the Battle of Narvik. The Dornier Do 26 flew over the Vassijaure railway station where a small Swedish force and the armored train Kiruna were stationed. The station was located 7 kilometers deep into Sweden. The commander of the Kiruna, Bo Furugård, fired warning shots toward the German plane. However, the German gunner responded by attacking the Swedish garrison. The conscript soldier Sven Sjöberg was collecting mail and was caught in the crossfire; he was shot in his upper body in front of a crowd of 50 civilians. The German plane would shortly thereafter leave the area. Sven Sjöberg would die due to his injuries while at the hospital in Kiruna 3 hours later. Bo Furugård recounts the event:

"After I, together with the train driver, had taken cover behind the anti-aircraft vehicle, I turned around to see if the others were alright. On the train tracks, right where I just stood, lay the soldier who had been to my right. He laid on his back. I did not realize that he had been hit, but thought that he had fallen and hurt himself, which is why he would have remained on his back. I ran out of cover to get him to safety, and then I noticed that he was unconscious. When I saw that he had a hard time breathing, I untied his uniform where I found a bullet wound on the right side of his chest. Meanwhile, the firefight had ceased and the plane headed towards the border. There was a waiting room in the train station. I called over a couple of soldiers to carry the wounded there. While we were occupied with this, a train had rolled into the station. The soldier was now instead carried onboard the train to second class. I thought that the train should travel back 6 kilometers towards the border where the closest medic was - the battalion medic at the ski battalion. However, the train driver refused as he was not meant to drive the train during an air raid warning. But he was willing to break the protocol, considering the severity of the situation, if he received a written order to do so from me. I found it to be easier to send the armored train to the border, while the medic was notified over the phone. A couple of minutes later, the medic arrived. He stated that the soldier was in critical condition and should be as soon as possible transported to the hospital in Kiruna."

— Bo Furugård (Note: This is a rough translation from the original Swedish: "När jag tillsammans med lokföraren kommit i skydd bakom luftvärnsvagnen, vände jag mig om för att se, hur det gått för de övriga. På spåret, där jag nyss stått, låg den soldat som uppehållit sig höger om mig. Han låg på rygg. Jag fattade inte, att han träffats, utan trodde att han snubblat, fallit, skadat sig och blivit liggande. För att hjälpa honom in i skydd sprang jag åter ut. Nu såg jag att han var medvetslös. Då han syntes ha svårt att andas, knäppte jag upp vapenrocken och fann därvid ett skottsår i högra delen av bröstet. Under tiden hade skottlossningen upphört och flygplanet försvunnit i riktning mot Riksgränsen. I järnvägs stationen fanns en väntsal. Jag ropade till mig några soldater för att bära den skadade dit. Medan vi var i färd med detta, kom ett persontåg in på bangården. Soldaten bars nu istället in i en andraklasskuppe i tåget. Min avsikt var att tåget skulle få backa tillbaka de 6 km till riksgränsen, där närmsta läkare fanns - bataljonsläkaren vid skidlöparbataljonen. Lokföraren vägrade emellertid under motiveringen, att hans reglemente förbjöd honom att flytta tåget under flyglarm. Men fick han bara en skriftligt ordet av mig, ansåg han sig med hänsyn till situationen kunna bryta mot givna bestämmelser. Jag fann det då enklare att sända pansartåget till riksgränsen, samtidigt som läkaren larmades per telefon. Några minuter senare anlände läkaren. Han konstaterade, att soldaten var svårt skadad och snabbast möjligt borde transporteras till lasarettet i Kiruna")

German planes continued to fly over the area throughout the rest of the day with another firefight occurring. The incursions continued the next day with an additional altercation between the Swedes and the Germans being reported. As a result of the skirmish, the Swedish representatives in Berlin protested to the German government. The incident strengthened the Swedes diplomatically against the Germans as the German general Nikolaus von Falkenhorst now found it harder to protest Swedish action in support of Norway. Falkenhorst was made aware of the incident while complaining to the Swedish general Thörnell about Swedish volunteers in Norway, Börje Furtenbach noted that the incident clearly made an impact on Falkenhorst.

A memorial was held for Sven Sjöberg in Kiruna on the 24th of May, which was attended by his regiment commander and most of the local population. The attendants marched with his casket towards his birth town of Piteå where he was buried in the Öjeby church.

=== Swedish retaliation ===
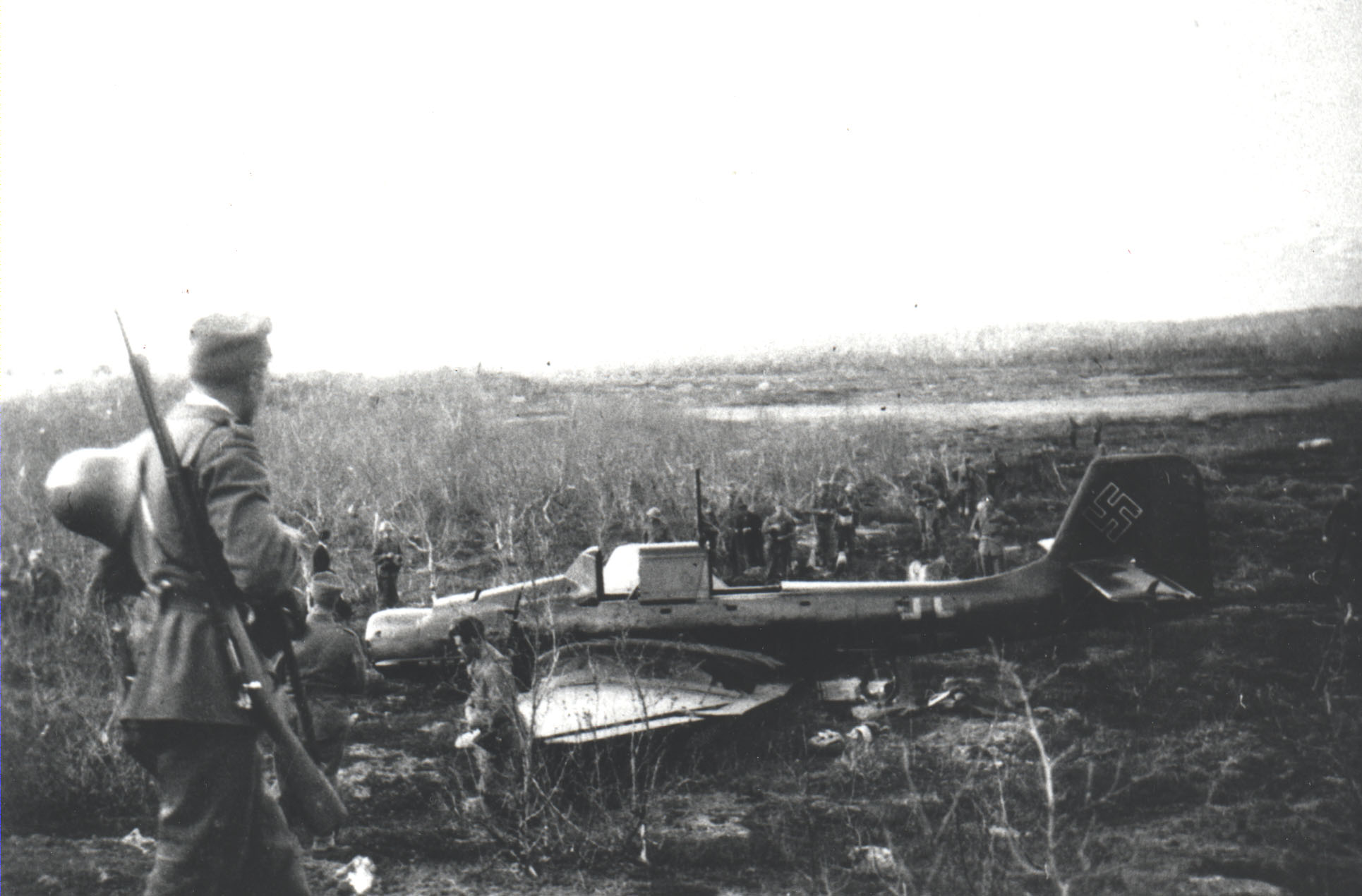
The downed German Junkers Ju 87 R-1 surrounded by Swedish soldiers.

Many of the Swedish soldiers stationed in the area were very moved after Sven Sjöberg's passing, and they in turn changed their demeanor towards foreign planes intruding into Swedish airspace. No German planes had been shot down in the area before Sjöberg's death but in the few days following the incident, 3 German planes would be downed by the Swedes. The first plane shot down after Sjöberg's death was a German Junkers Ju 87 R-1 on the 2nd of June. The Allied forces had pressed the Germans at Narvik toward the Swedish border where intense fighting ensued. The possession of the airfield in Hattfjelldal by the Germans meant that large squadrons of German fighter planes could take part in the battle. The Swedes had moved forces to the area to protect Sweden's sovereignty. The German Junkers Ju 87 R-1 would come under fire from both British and Swedish forces and was forced to make an emergency landing in the small Swedish town of Abisko after its fuel tank was hit. The Swedish soldier Paul Andersson estimated that their battalion shot around 120 shots toward the German plane. Its two pilots, Hans Ott and Günter Brack, would be captured by the Swedes.

Only a few minutes after the Ju 87 R-1 crashed, a fleet of German Junkers Ju 52 could be seen by the Swedish company. The Swedes had, however, been aware of the planes for some time due to the warnings received from Tärnaby in Västerbotten. The Junkers 52s were tasked with strengthening the German positions in Bjørnfjell with paratrooper platoons. After one of the Junkers 52s accidentally flew into Swedish airspace, it was quickly spotted and engaged by the Swedish military. A total of 12 shots were fired towards the aircraft which plunged to the ground after 3 shots made contact. Of a crew of 11, only 7 would survive the crash after managing to deploy their parachutes but they were later swiftly captured by Swedish forces, they were Hans Tücher, Franz Reichard, Gustav Mank, Walter Himmrich, Hermann Bansen, Arno Wolf and Adolf Koch. The high death toll among the German crew was celebrated by several of the Swedish soldiers involved in the downing of the plane as well as large portions of the population in the area as it was seen as revenge for the death of Sven Sjöberg.

On the 8th of June, a German Junkers Ju 88 intruded onto Swedish territory. The aircraft came under fire while flying over Vassijaure and became unmaneuverable due to the damaged received by oncoming fire. The plane did however, manage to leave Swedish airspace and make an emergency landing in Bjørnfjell, Norway. The German general Eduard Dietl comments on the situation in his diary:

"Sweden has once again shot towards our airplanes without (first) firing warning shots."

— Eduard Dietl

== Aftermath ==
The seven German survivors from the Junkers 52 would be sent to Kiruna with a Swedish military escort while another Swedish force collected the remains of the ones lost. However, there was never any sign of bitterness from the Germans as when they recognized one of the Swedish soldiers who had been involved in the shooting, Paul Andersson, they greeted him nicely and said "Well shot!". The pilot of the Junkers 52 was interrogated by the Swedish secret services to whom he claimed that the plane was in fact shot over Norway. All of the men would eventually be released back to Germany on the 12th of July where they would continue to fight in World War II. The survivors of the Junkers Ju 87 R-1 would also be detained in Kiruna. Hans Ott would be returned to Germany on the 12th of July and Gunter Brack a bit earlier on the 28th of June as he had been affected by rheumatoid arthritis.

The Swedish soldiers involved in the interdiction of the German planes would be awarded 1 day of leave as well as donations from the public as thanks for defending the border.

The wreck of the Junkers Ju 87 R-1 would be sent to Linköping via train to be studied, and was eventually returned to Germany on the 31st of October.

A monument would be raised on Vassijaure station in Sven Sjöberg's honor in 2002.

== See also ==
- Battle of Narvik
- Skirmish at Sövde
- Sweden during World War II
