= Slottsparken, Malmö =

Park in Malmö, Sweden

Coordinates: 55.6024°N 12.9900°E

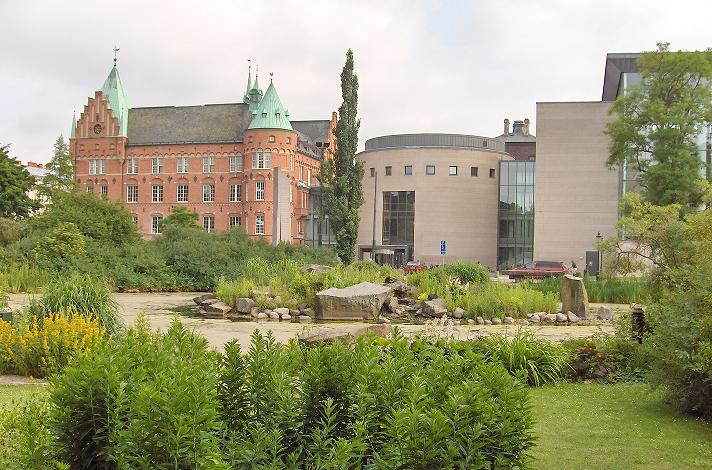
Malmö City Library seen from Slottsparken

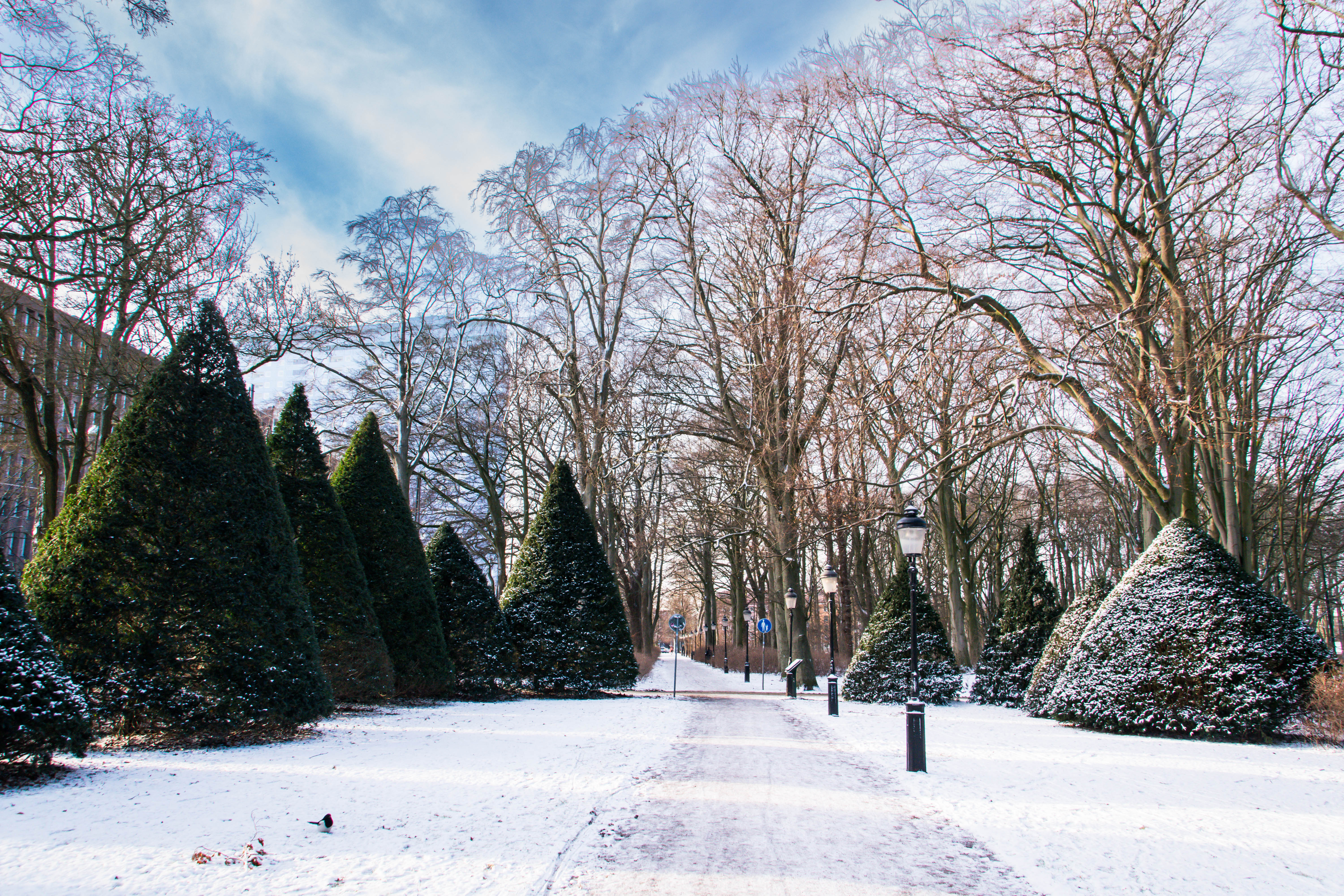
Slottsparken in winter

Slottsparken is a park in Malmö, Sweden established in 1897 and opened for public in 1900. Malmö City Library is located in one corner of the park. Across the canal to the north lies Kungsparken, which was known as Slottsparken until 1881. Because of this name change and the fact that the two parks effectively form one continuous park, there is often confusion about the names, even on maps.

The park is a popular place to go for a walk on a sunny day with children on account of the large playground and the many birds living in Big Pond (Swedish: Stora dammen), including ducks, black-headed gulls, grey herons and swans.
