= August Spångberg =

Swedish politician (1893–1987)

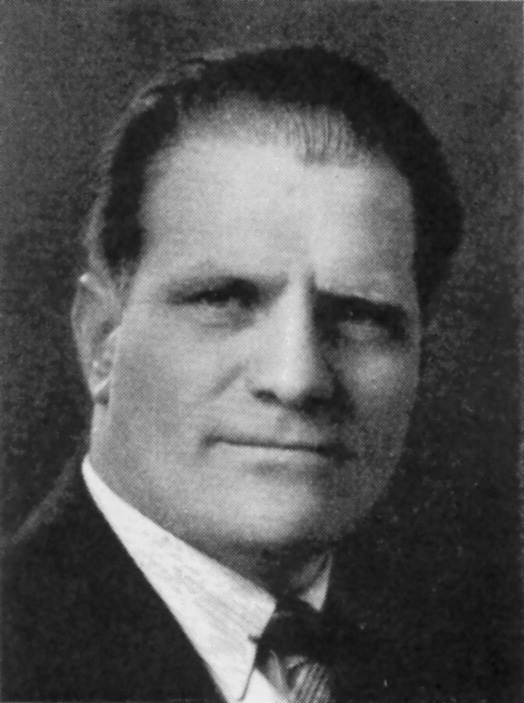
- August Spångberg

Member of the Sweden Parliament for Värmland
- In office 1922–1964

Personal details
- Born: 29 March 1893: Lämtjärnsfallet, Nora, Örebro, Sweden; 59.551003°N 14.670334°E
- Died: 19 June 1987 (aged 94) Charlottenberg, Värmland, Sweden
- Resting place: Eda Kyrkogård, Eda, Värmland, Sweden; 59.839275°N 12.313503°E
- Spouse: Sofia Elisabet Nilsson (m. 1921; died 1987)
- Children: Arne Spångberg
- Parents: August Carlsson (father); Anna Lovisa Spångberg (mother)
- Relatives: Sten Spångberg (half-sibling); Linnéa Spångberg (half-sibling)
- Awards: Order of St. Olav; Eldh-Ekblad Peace Prize
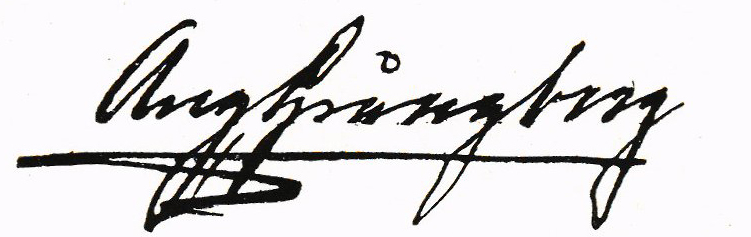
- Signature

August Konrad Ferdinand Spångberg (29 March 1893 – 19 June 1987) was a Swedish politician who served in the Riksdag, the Swedish parliament, for 42 years (1922–1964). He was a member of the directly elected Second Chamber (Andra Kammaren), representing the Värmland County constituency.

Spångberg is best known for his resistance work during World War II, assisting the Norwegian resistance and helping political refugees escape Nazi-occupied Norway from his position in Charlottenberg on the Swedish-Norwegian border. Among those he helped reach safety was future German Chancellor Willy Brandt. This humanitarian work earned him the Order of St. Olav.

Throughout his parliamentary career, Spångberg was a prominent advocate for Swedish republicanism, authoring multiple motions to abolish the monarchy and establish a democratic republic. He also gained recognition for his vocal criticism of the government's handling of the 1931 Ådalen shootings, his investigation of the Unman legal scandal, and his lifelong commitment to peace activism, for which he was awarded the Eldh-Ekblad Peace Prize in 1967.

== Early life ==
August Konrad Ferdinand Spångberg was born on 29 March 1893, at the Lämtjärnsfallet settlement in Nora Municipality, Örebro County, Sweden. His mother was Anna Lovisa Spångberg (born 1870), and his father was August Carlsson, a miller's son, who left for America before August was born. (Note: The baptism entry in the födelsebok (post nr 42) names only the mother.) August's two half-siblings were Sten (born 1900) and Linnéa (born 1904), who would become a Swedish movie actress. Spångberg spent his early years living with his maternal grandfather, Karl Fredrik Spångberg, a crofter and coal burner.

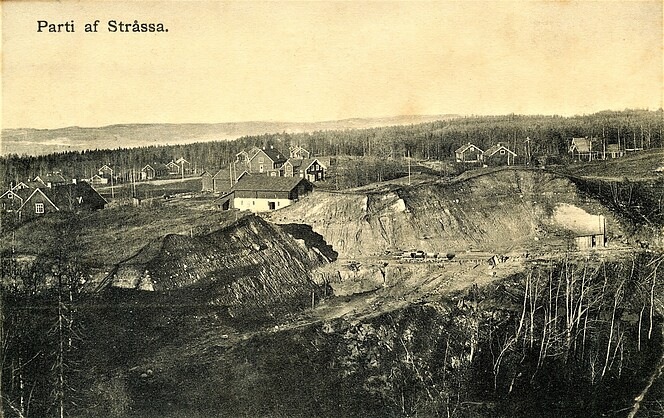
Stråssa, Örebro, ore field in 1910

Spångberg had to work from an early age. At around 10 years old, he briefly tried ore washing at Blanka mine in Stråssa, Örebro County, but found the work boring and damaging to his clothes. He preferred working in the forest, where he began chopping bushes and felling trees between school terms. When his grandfather Karl Fredrik Spångberg emigrated to join relatives in Newberry, Michigan in 1904, August was initially meant to live at a small farm called Smällfallet in Nora, Örebro County, but this arrangement fell through. He instead reunited with his mother and stepfather Anders Gustaf Olsson, helping with gravestone carving work in nearby Järnboås. In 1907, he worked on a dam being constructed at Brattfors power station in Värmland, and later as a farmhand at Kortforstorp, in Karlskoga, Örebro County, from 1908 to 1910. He next worked at the Storfors ironworks in Värmland, and eventually obtained employment as a coachman and stableman with the Swedish Railways in 1916.

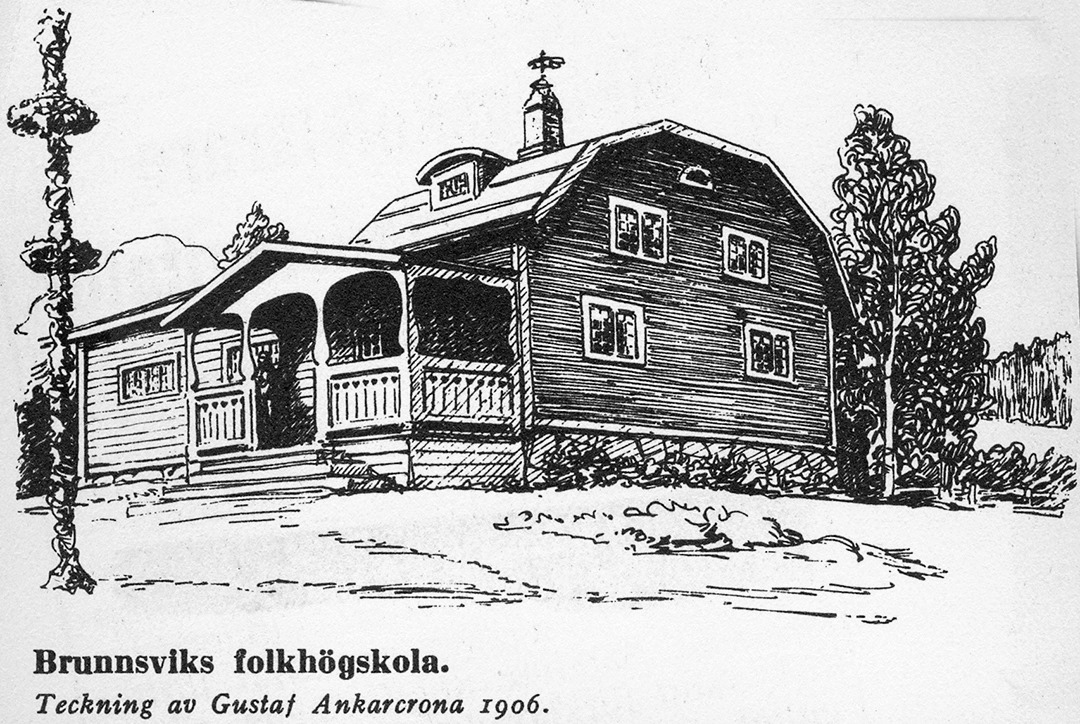
An image of Brunnsvik Folk High School, where Spångberg studied in 1919.

Spångberg's formal education consisted of basic schooling in Skärhyttan's rural school. In 1919, he attended Brunnsvik Folk High School on a scholarship from the Railwaymen's Union, which proved to be a formative educational experience. At Brunnsvik, he studied under headmaster Sigfrid Gunnäs and was influenced by teachers Yngve Hugo and Eva and Niklas Bergius. He also encountered important cultural figures like the poets Dan Andersson and Harry Blomberg during his time there. Beyond formal education, Spångberg was largely self-taught through extensive reading and participation in study circles within the labor and temperance movements, which he first encountered at the age of 15.

== Marriage and family ==
August Spångberg married Sofia Elisabet Nilsson on 9 July 1921, in a civil ceremony. Sofia shared his political convictions and was active in the same temperance and political organizations. Together they led the Children's Guild (Barngillet) in Charlottenberg, educating local youth on political matters.

Their son Arne was born on 6 November 1922, during Spångberg's recovery from a serious heart inflammation. In his memoir, Spångberg noted that becoming a father gave him "a double responsibility" and strengthened his resolve to build a better world for future generations.

When August was elected to parliament in 1922, the family periodically lived in Stockholm while maintaining their home in Värmland.

== Political career ==
=== Political evolution ===
Spångberg's political path was marked by several transitions as he navigated the fracturing and realignment of Sweden's left throughout his career:

- Social Democratic Youth Club (joined 1911): Spångberg first joined the Social Democratic Youth Club in Granbergsdal outside Karlskoga.
- Social Democratic Left Party (1917–1921): When the Social Democratic Party split in 1917, Spångberg joined the Left Socialist faction (Sveriges Socialdemokratiska Vänsterparti, SSV).
- Communist Party of Sweden (1921–1929): When the SSV was renamed the Communist Party of Sweden in 1921, Spångberg continued as a member. He was elected to the Riksdag in 1922, becoming the youngest parliamentarian at age 29.
- Communist/Socialist Party (1929–1937): In 1929, Spångberg and the majority of Swedish Communists were expelled from the Party. He then joined Karl Kilbom in a parallel Communist Party of Sweden, which kept that name until 1934 when it was renamed the Socialist Party.
- Social Democratic Party (1938–1964): After the Socialist Party fractured in a leadership struggle between Kilbom and Nils Flyg, Spångberg joined the Social Democratic Party in January 1938, where he remained until his retirement from parliament.

=== Early political activism (1908-1921) ===
As a young man he was active in both the workers' temperance and political youth movements. His first organizational affiliation was with the Nytt Hopp (New Hope) lodge of Nykterhetsorden Verdandi (NOV) in Korsnäs, Dalarna County, in 1908, followed by joining the Social Democratic Youth Club (Socialdemokratiska Ungdomsklubben). In 1912, he was arrested by police along with other youth club members for distributing anti-militarist leaflets at Nora market.

After moving to Charlottenberg in Värmland in 1913, Spångberg became involved in rebuilding the local Social Democratic Youth Club and International Organization of Good Templars (Internationella Godtemplarorden), and was one of the founders of the local workers' commune. As a railway worker, he joined the branch of the Swedish Railway Workers' Union in Charlottenberg, where he was appointed as a congress delegate in 1918 and elected to the board of the union.

In the 1917 split of the Social Democratic Party, Spångberg joined the Left Socialist group. His strong anti-militarist and internationalist commitment was one of the factors that brought him to the left wing of the movement.

=== Early parliamentary career (1922-1928) ===
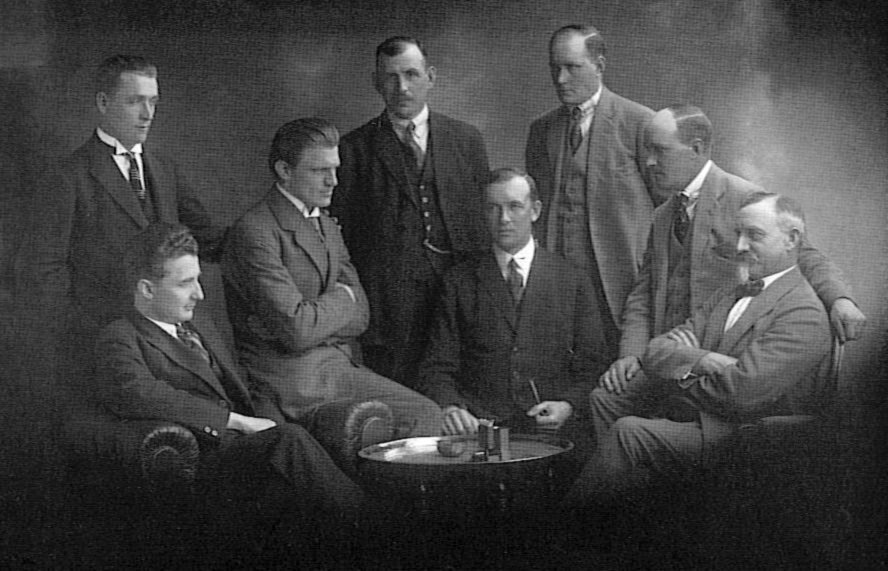
The first communist group in parliament in c 1922. Standing from left: Viktor Herou, Verner Karlsson, J. P. Dahlén. Sitting from left: Karl Kilbom, August Spångberg, Helmer Molander, Carl Winberg.

In 1922, at age 29, he became the youngest member ever elected to the Swedish parliament. Spångberg was notable for his radical positions in parliament. He refused to attend the king's speech from the throne and in his maiden speech demanded the rejection of appropriations for the royal house. He was also active in raising issues about the conditions of crofters and tenants, agricultural workers in Värmland, and protested against the treatment of Finland's Red side after the 1918 civil war.

Throughout his parliamentary career, Spångberg was a prominent advocate for republicanism in Sweden. In 1924, he authored a major motion arguing for the establishment of a republic, marking one of the first serious parliamentary challenges to the Swedish monarchy. The motion provided a detailed historical critique of the Swedish monarchy, arguing that it was incompatible with democratic principles. During the debate, Spångberg was interrupted by the President of the Parliament when he suggested that "Gustav V would go willingly after the Riksdag had decided" to abolish the monarchy. Though the Constitutional Committee rejected the motion, Spångberg continued to raise the issue throughout his time in parliament.

He played a crucial role in exposing the Carlbom affair, a major financial scandal involving the Swedish Railwaymen's Union's treasurer Per Emil Carlbom, who had embezzled approximately 1.5 million kronor. Spångberg had warned about irregularities as early as 1921 and helped bring the scandal to light.

=== Socialist Party years (1929-1937) ===
In 1929, Spångberg, along with the majority of Swedish Communists, was expelled from the party. He then joined Karl Kilbom in the independent communist party (later renamed the Socialist Party). Spångberg's strong position in Värmland's radical workers' circles meant that practically the entire party district followed him.

A significant part of his parliamentary work during this period focused on the Ådalen shootings of 1931, where five people were killed by military forces during a labor demonstration. Spångberg was one of the most vocal critics of the government's handling of the incident and helped lead the parliamentary investigation. He was interrupted several times for offensive language while speaking in parliament and was fined for allegedly "glorifying a criminal act" during his speaking tours.

In 1937, August Spångberg traveled with Ture Nerman to Spain during the Spanish Civil War. They witnessed the May Days fighting in Barcelona while staying at the Hotel Victoria, which resulted in significant casualties. They found themselves in the middle of a conflict between syndicalists and left-wing socialists on one side and the Communist Party and government on the other.

That same year, Spångberg had interpellated the government to protest against the Moscow Trials with the execution of several prominent Bolshevik leaders. The Moscow Trials were part of a series of show trials held in the Soviet Union during the late 1930s under Joseph Stalin.

=== Return to Social Democracy and World War II (1938-1945) ===
Upon returning to Sweden from Spain, Spångberg found his party divided in a struggle between Karl Kilbom and Nils Flyg. When the Socialist Party split in early summer 1937, Spångberg urged party leader Nils Flyg to initiate discussions about a merger with the Social Democrats. When this call went unheeded, in January 1938, he applied for entry into his hometown's social democratic workers' commune.

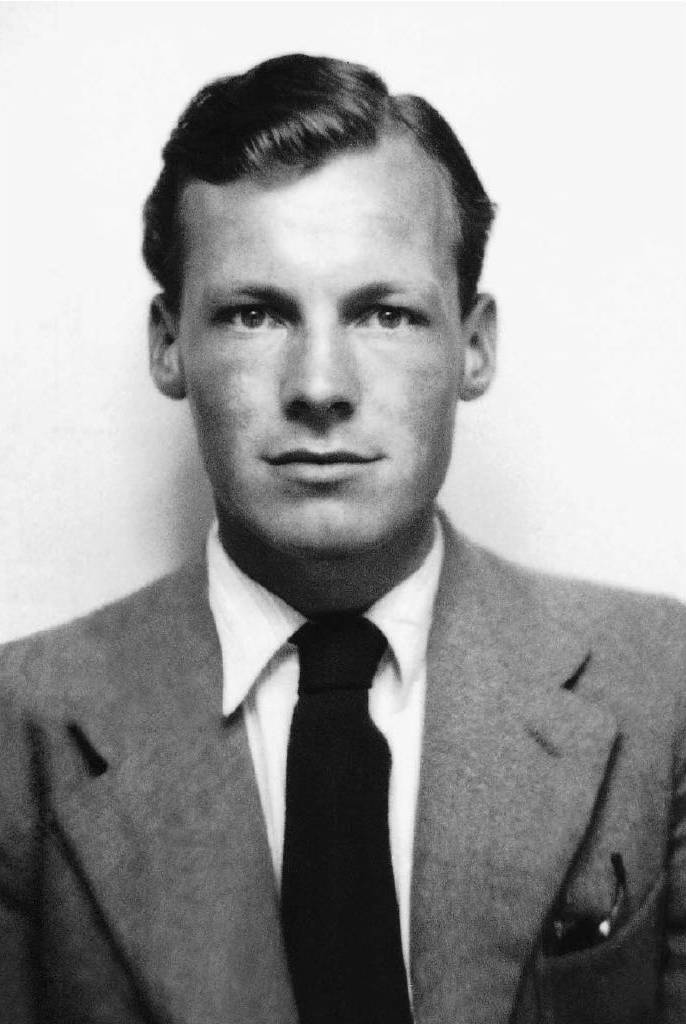
Herbert Frahm's (Willy Brandt) Norwegian passport photograph 1933–1940.

During World War II, Spångberg played a significant role in the Norwegian resistance movement against the Nazi occupation of Norway. Operating from his position near the border at Charlottenberg, he helped many refugees escape Nazi-occupied Norway, including Willy Brandt, who would later become Chancellor of West Germany. After escaping from a Nazi detention camp, Brandt was among those Spångberg helped reach safety in Stockholm, where he continued his work for the Norwegian press.

Spångberg's position at the Charlottenberg railway station on the Swedish-Norwegian border made him a key figure in the resistance network. Together with trusted colleagues at the railway, he established safe routes for refugees and organized an extensive intelligence network. He facilitated the transportation of illegal newspapers, letters, propaganda materials, and even a printing press into occupied Norway. Spångberg also organized humanitarian aid for Norwegians, working with the group Svenska Norgehjälpen to provide food for Norwegian railway workers, postal employees, and others who crossed the border for work. His home became a safe house for refugees and couriers, and he maintained contacts with both the Norwegian government-in-exile and the Swedish authorities, often navigating the complex political situation where Sweden's official neutrality sometimes conflicted with humanitarian needs.

For his efforts aiding the Norwegian resistance, in 1946 Spångberg was awarded the Knight's Cross 1st Class (Ridder av 1. klasse) of the Order of St. Olav. Spångberg, a Social Democrat with principled reservations about accepting royal honors, deliberated before accepting; in his memoir he noted that the decision generated "a lot of writing in the press about whether a Social Democrat should accept orders under any circumstances." His wife Sofia received the King Haakon VII Freedom Cross, and the couple maintained long-standing friendships with Norwegian resistance fighters through the Border Club (Gränseklubben) during the peace years.

=== Later parliamentary career (1946-1964) ===
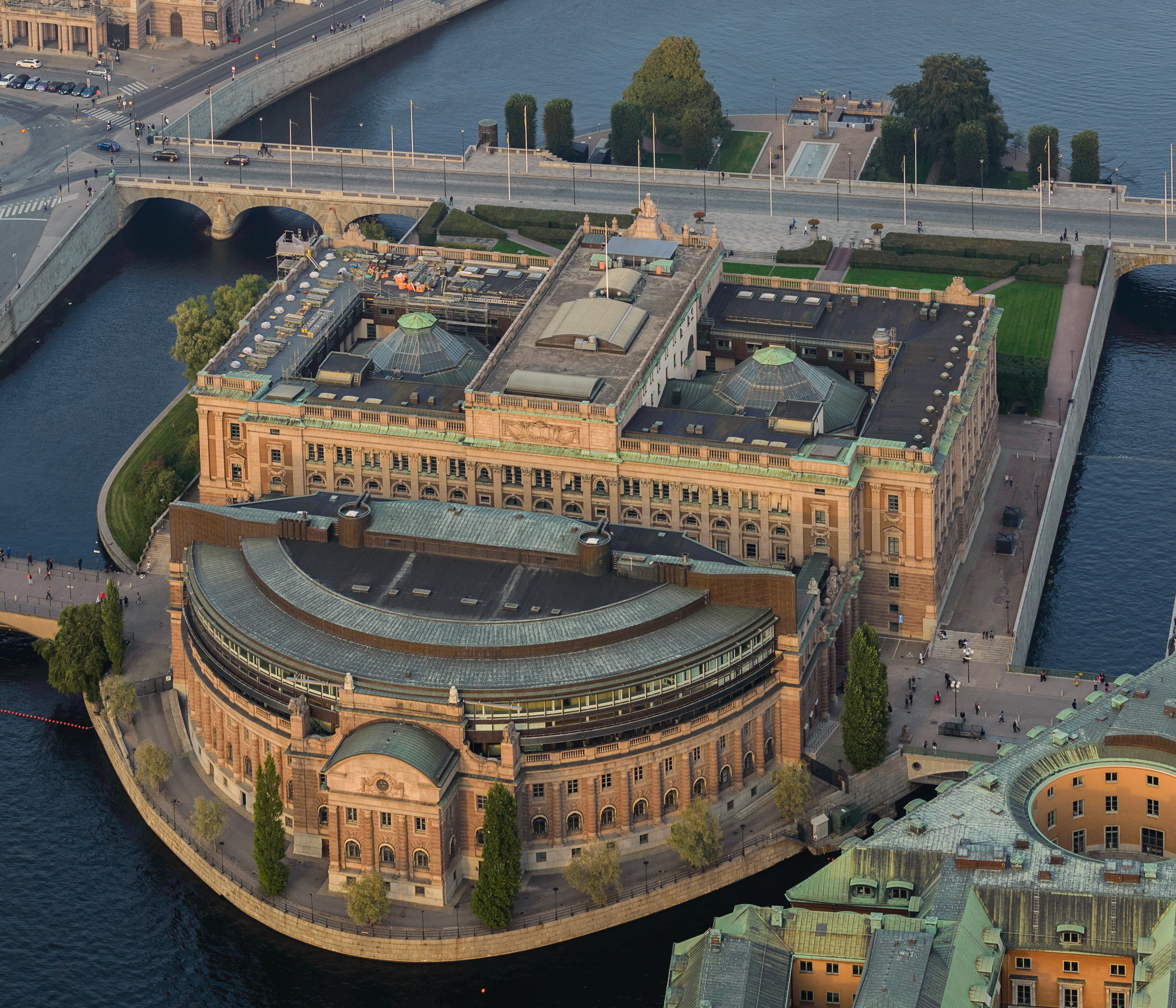
Parliament House in the Gamla stan district of central Stockholm.

In the 1950s and 1960s, Spångberg was instrumental in investigating and exposing what became known as the Unman affair (or Lundquist affair), a complex legal case involving guardianship abuse and judicial misconduct. His work on this case helped highlight issues in the Swedish legal system. This issue, in his own opinion, took up more of his parliamentary time than any other, and prompted him at the age of 82 to publish the novel Rådmannen: en historia om ett brott (The Councilman: A Story of a Crime) in 1975.

He was also deeply involved in the cause of conscientious objectors, particularly advocating for Jehovah's Witnesses and others who refused military service on ethical or religious grounds. His persistent work on this issue contributed to legislative changes in 1964 that provided humanitarian solutions for conscientious objectors. Among his final efforts in the Riksdag were a proposal to grant immunity to total conscientious objectors—whom he referred to as 'prisoners of peace'—and a formal inquiry into the true costs of military defense.

Spångberg served 46 sessions in parliament until 1964 when he retired at the age of 71.

=== Peace work and international relations ===
During World War II, Spångberg demonstrated his commitment to democratic principles by voting against banning the Communist Party in 1940, believing civil liberties should be preserved even during wartime.

In the post-war period, Spångberg became an active international peace advocate. He made diplomatic visits to Eastern European countries and participated in peace congresses across Europe, including the Inter-Parliamentary Union congress in Brussels in 1961.

In 1962, he attended the World Peace Congress in Moscow as a Swedish Peace Committee delegate, accompanied by his wife. Despite criticism from some colleagues who accused him of spreading communist propaganda, Spångberg saw himself as a politician dedicated to détente.

From 1963 to 1964, Spångberg played a crucial role in the parliamentary investigation of the Wennerström spy case, one of the most significant espionage scandals in Swedish Cold War history. Stig Wennerström, a high-ranking Swedish Air Force colonel, had been passing classified military information to the Soviet Union for years. As a member of the Committee on the Constitution (konstitutionsutskottet), Spångberg helped examine the government's handling of this complex and sensitive affair. The investigation revealed a massive breach of national security, with Wennerström having provided the Soviets with critical intelligence about Swedish and NATO defense capabilities over nearly two decades. His arrest in 1963 sent shockwaves through Swedish society and raised serious questions about military intelligence and national security protocols.

In 1967, Spångberg was awarded the Eldh-Ekblad Peace Prize for his "unwavering work for the cause of peace."

== Pensioner ==
For almost a quarter of a century as a pensioner, Spångberg continued to follow political life, led study circles within the Charlottenberg pensioners' association and the peace association, and attended the annual conferences of the county Social Democratic Workers' Party. At the age of 90, he was appointed a congress delegate of the Swedish Association of Hard of Hearing People (Hörselfrämjandets Riksförbund). Despite his own hearing impairment, he played a key role in founding the local branch in Charlottenberg.

== Archive and park ==
A memorial park next to the Eda Municipality Library in Charlottenberg, named August Spångbergs Park, features the Charlottenberg Bell Tower. In November 2022, his parliamentary documents, letters, and literature were moved from the library to the Regional Archives of Värmland (Värmlandsarkiv), part of the Swedish National Archives.

== Obituary ==
Militant Friend of Peace

Idealist and parliament member August Spångberg, of Charlottenberg, has died at the age of 94.

He was born in Nora parish, Örebro. During the years 1922-1964, he was a member of the lower chamber of parliament, first for the Socialist party and later for the Social Democrats. During that period, he participated in 46 sessions of parliament. He was known as a fighting member and several times introduced legislation leading to a more democratic form of government. At one time, his efforts were opposed by then Prime Minister Tage Erlander as being impractical.

For his role in Norway's resistance effort during World War II, he was awarded the Norwegian Order of St. Olav. In 1967, he was presented with the Eldhs peace award for his "unfaltering efforts in the cause of peace and disarmament." He labored many years in the Swedish peace and neutrality societies.

At the age of 82, he authored a novel, Radmannen, the Tale of a Crime, which dealt with the Lundquist affair of the 1950s, in which he had been involved and against which he fought.

The nearest survivors include his wife, Sofia, nee Nilsson, a son Arne, his wife Anne-Marie, and several grandchildren and great-grandchildren.

== Works ==
The following bibliography is compiled from Blomqvist's article in Svenskt biografiskt lexikon and the Libris author authority record.

=== Books and pamphlets ===
- 1922: With Karl Kilbom, Helmer Molander, and Carl Winberg: Klasskampen i riksdagen: kommunisterna gå till rätta med lönenedpressningarna, kungamakten, arbetslöshetspolitiken och den orättvisa jordfördelningen. Tal i riksdagen 1922 (Class Struggle in the Riksdag: Speeches in the Riksdag 1922). Stockholm: Fram. Spångberg contributed "Ned med kungamakten. Varför icke sparsamhet för kungahuset?" (Down with the Monarchy: Why Not Thrift for the Royal House?), pp. 30–31.
- 1923: Nationernas förbund, reaktionens och våldspolitikens säkraste fäste (The League of Nations, The Surest Fortress of Reaction and Violence Politics). Stockholm: Fram. Published anonymously; the parliamentary motion reproduced in the pamphlet was co-written with Carl Winberg.
- 1924: Fascistiska tendenser i Sverige – stäck dem i deras linda! (Fascist Tendencies in Sweden – Nip Them in the Bud!). Stockholm: Fram.
- 1924: Vart de olika partierna sträva (Where the Different Parties Are Striving). Stockholm: Fram.
- 1926: Socialdemokratisk arbetarpolitik vid "vänstersamverkans" riksdag (Social Democratic Labor Politics in the "Left Cooperation" Parliament). Stockholm: Fram. Two editions in the same year.
- 1931: Bröd eller svältdöd? (Bread or Starvation?). Stockholm.
- 1932: Program och gärningar. Socialdemokratisk riksdagspolitik valperioden 1929–1932. Hundratals miljoner till kungamakt, militarism och storsvindlare – inget åt de arbetslösa (Programs and Deeds: Social Democratic Parliamentary Politics 1929–1932. Hundreds of Millions for the Monarchy, Militarism and Major Swindlers – Nothing for the Unemployed). Stockholm: Sveriges kommunistiska parti.
- 1933: Arbetslöshetsförsäkringen. Vad innebär förslaget? (Unemployment Insurance: What Does the Proposal Entail?). Stockholm: Partiförlaget. Reached six editions in 1933 commenting on the initial proposals; a revised seventh edition the same year, retitled Vad innebär regeringsförslaget?, commented on the government's revised proposal.
- 1934: Luftförsäkringen mot arbetslösheten. En kritisk granskning (The Phantom Insurance Against Unemployment: A Critical Review). Stockholm: Partiförlaget.
- 1937: Spanien i revolution (Spain in Revolution). Stockholm: Folket. Three editions in the same year.
- 1966: I tidens ström (In Time's Stream). Stockholm: Bok och Bild. Memoir.
- 1975: Rådmannen: en historia om ett brott (The Councilman: A Story of a Crime). Stockholm: Smålänningen. Novel.

=== Articles ===
- 1921: "Knut Wicksell. Till hans sjuttioårsdag den 20 december 1921" (Knut Wicksell: On His Seventieth Birthday, 20 December 1921). Tiden, vol. 13, pp. 327–333.
- 1937: "Reflexioner kring 1937 års riksdag" (Reflections on the 1937 Parliament). Socialistisk tidskrift, vol. 3, pp. 129–131.

== See also ==
- List of peace activists
- List of Swedish politicians
- List of former members of the Riksdag

== Bibliography ==
- Aas, Oddvar (1980). Norske penneknekter i eksil: en beretning om Stockholms-legasjonens pressekontor under krigen [Norwegian Pen-Soldiers in Exile: An Account of the Stockholm Legation's Press Office During the War] (in Norwegian). Oslo: Tiden. p. 63. ISBN 978-82-10-01920-3.
- "August Spångberg, 1893-1987". Libris. Kungliga biblioteket.
- Blomqvist, Håkan. "August KF Spångberg". Svenskt biografiskt lexikon. Riksarkivet.
- Brandt, Willy; Lania, Leo (1960). My Road to Berlin. Garden City, N.Y.: Doubleday. OCLC 403498.
- Dagens Nyheter (24 June 1987). "Militant Friend of Peace". Obituary, translated by Arthur Holmberg.
- Eda kommunbibliotek (19 March 2025). "Eda kommunbibliotek" (email).
- Fredslaget. "Striden For Fred". Archived from the original on 29 September 2007.
- German Resistance Memorial Center. "Willy Brandt - Biographie".
- Johansen, Per Ole (1984). Oss selv nærmst: Norge og jødene 1914-1943. Oslo: Gyldendal. ISBN 978-8205150621.
- Moström, Jenny (2021). "Sofia Elisabet Spångberg 1898-10-23 — 1992-04-09 Peace activist". Svenskt kvinnobiografiskt lexikon.
- Nora bergsförsamling (1892–1901). "Husförhörslängder, Västra delen, Lämtjärnsfallet (under Stadra gård), Spångberg household, post nr 9 (August Konrad Ferdinand)". Riksarkivet. SE/ULA/11098/A I/19 c.
- Norges Statskalender (1947). Hald, Harald (ed.). Norges Statskalender for året 1947 [Norway's State Calendar for the Year 1947] (in Norwegian). Oslo: H. Aschehoug & Co. (W. Nygaard). p. 1053.
- Riksarkivet. "Riksarkivet - Sök i arkiven".
- Royal Norwegian Order of St. Olav (11 March 2011). "The Order of St. Olav". Source letter from Anders Flagen, Head of Chancellery, Order of St. Olav.
- Spångberg, August (1966). I tidens ström [In the Stream of Time] (PDF) (in Swedish). Stockholm: Bok o. bild. Archived from the original on 18 August 2010.
- Statistiska centralbyrån (1893). "Utdrag ur födelse-, vigsel- och dödböcker 1860–1949: Nora bergsförsamling, födelsebok 1893, post nr 42". Riksarkivet. SE/RA/420401/01/H 1 AA/1083.
- Visit Värmland. "August Spångbergs Park".
- Wein, Martin (2003). Willy Brandt: Das Werden eines Staatsmannes. Berlin: Aufbau-Verlag. ISBN 3746619920.
