= Spångberg =

Spångberg can be both a middle name and a surname. Notable people with the surname include:

- Marie Spångberg Holth (1865–1942), Norwegian physician
- Arvid Spångberg (1890–1959), Swedish diver and bandy player
- August Spångberg (1893–1987), Swedish politician
- Birgit Spångberg (1900-1937), Swedish lawyer
- Eva Spångberg (1923–2011), Swedish sculptor
- Jacob Spångberg (born 1994), Swedish ice hockey player
- Roland Spångberg (1923–2011), Swedish water polo player
- Sofia Spångberg (1898–1992), Swedish peace activist
