= Helmer Molander =

Swedish politician (1892–1963)

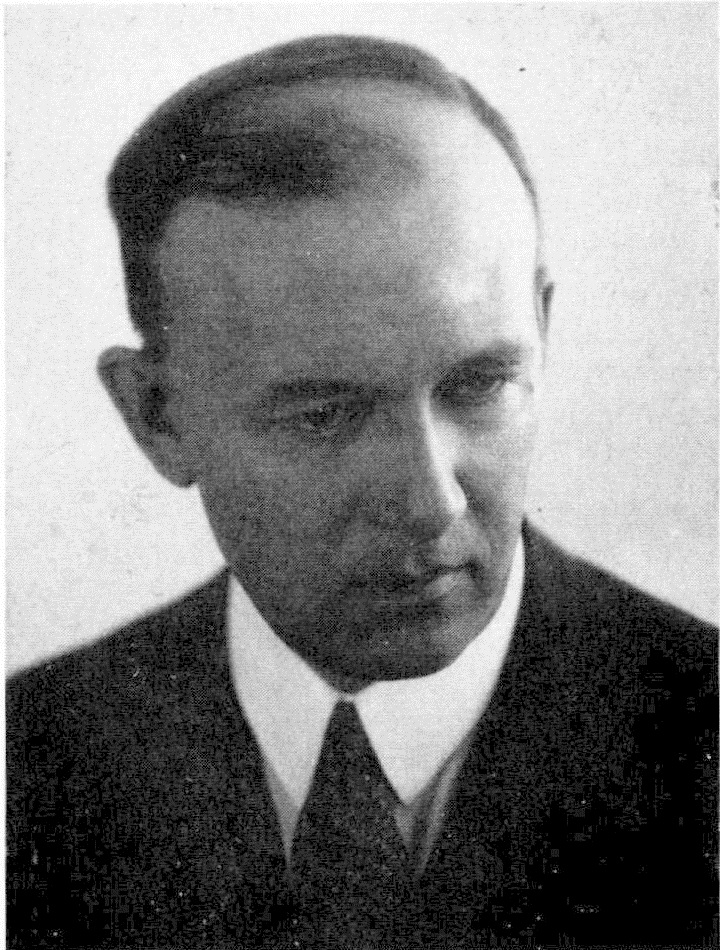
Helmer Molander

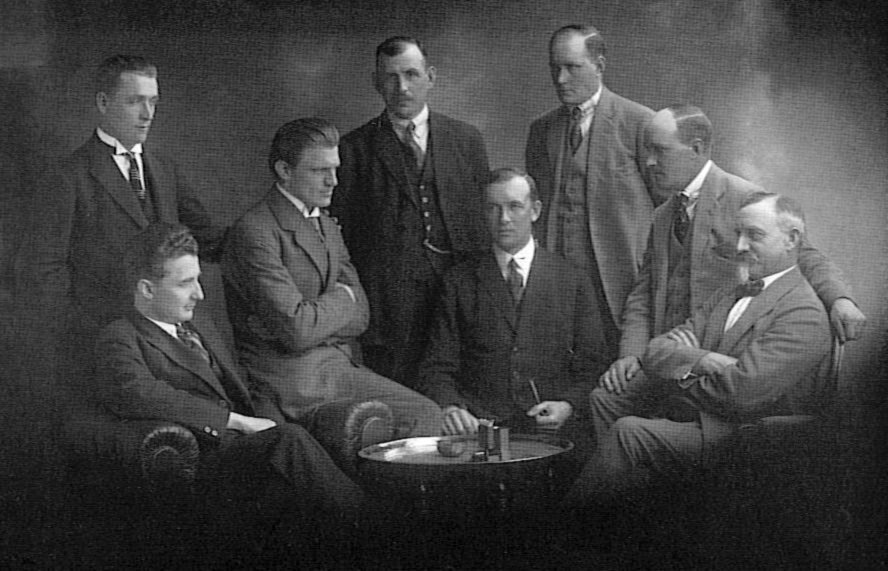
The first communist group in parliament 1922. Standing from left: Viktor Herou, Verner Karlsson, J. P. Dahlén. Sitting from left: Karl Kilbom, August Spångberg, Helmer Molander, Carl Winberg.

Helmer Molander (June 26, 1892 in Ytterlännäs – August 22, 1963 in Gudmundrå) was a Swedish politician.

== Early years ==
Helmer Molander was born in 1892, son of Jonas Molander and Anna Sofia Äsén. His father was a carpenter by profession. The household where Molander grew up was embedded into the nascent labour movement. His brother was a trade union activist. Helmer Molander began working at a saw mill as a teenager. He became active in the local Social Democratic Youth club.

== Politics ==
When the Social Democratic Party was split in 1917, Molander sided with the left-wing. After a brief experience in local politics (he served as vice chairman of the Säbrå municipal council 1920–1926), Molander was elected to Parliament and Västernorrland County Council as a candidate of the Communist Party. In 1924, he represented the Communist Party of Sweden at the Fourth World Congress of the Communist International.

When the Communist Party split in 1924, Molander sided with Zeth Höglund's independent Communist Party. Molander was the sole member of the Höglund party in the Second Chamber of parliament.

Soon Höglund's party would merge back into the Social Democratic Party. Between 1926 and 1941, Molander worked as ombudsman of the Social Democratic Party District of Ångermanland. As a key organizer of the party in Ångermanland, Molander's political work was characterized by sharp confrontations with the Communist Party and the Farmers' League. Following the deadly 1931 Ådalen riots, the Social Democratic Party organized an investigatory commission consisting of Molander, Ivar Vennerström and Georg Branting. In spite of his militant past, Molander appealed for calm after the killings. The day after the investigatory commission reached Kramfors, the three leaders would speak at a mass rally. The meeting was disturbed by followers of the Communist Party.

Molander also represented the Social Democratic Party in parliament. As a parliamentarian, he was engaged in issues like the abolition of the bicameral system and lowering the age of suffrage. In 1928, he was included into the national party board (where he remained until 1941). He served as chairman of the Västernorrland County Council between 1938 and 1940. In 1941, he was appointed county director, thereby resigning from all political positions.
