= Verdandisten =

Swedish periodical published by Verdandi

- Spring 2024 edition cover
- Categories: Social policy, temperance, community activism
- Frequency: Periodical
- Format: Magazine
- Publisher: Verdandi
- Founded: 1897
- First issue: March 4, 1897; 129 years ago
- Country: Sweden
- Based in: Stockholm
- Language: Swedish
- Website: www.verdandi.se/verdandisten-nr-1/
- ISSN: 0346-3869

Verdandisten is a Swedish periodical published by the social‑political organization Verdandi. The magazine was first issued in 1897 and has historically served as a platform for social policy, sobriety advocacy, and community organizing within the Swedish temperance and workers’ movements.

== Content and political role ==
Verdandisten combines temperance advocacy with the political and social program of the Verdandi movement. Historian Madeleine Hurd describes Verdandi as Stockholm's most radical temperance organization and notes that it consistently links temperance with radical socialism.

The newspaper presents alcohol as a social and political issue connected to poverty, class relations, and working conditions. It argues that overwork and the organization of industrial production contributed to drinking. Its fiction and poetry also servea didactic and political purposes, presenting sobriety, education, and trade-union organization as elements of working-class advancement.

== History ==
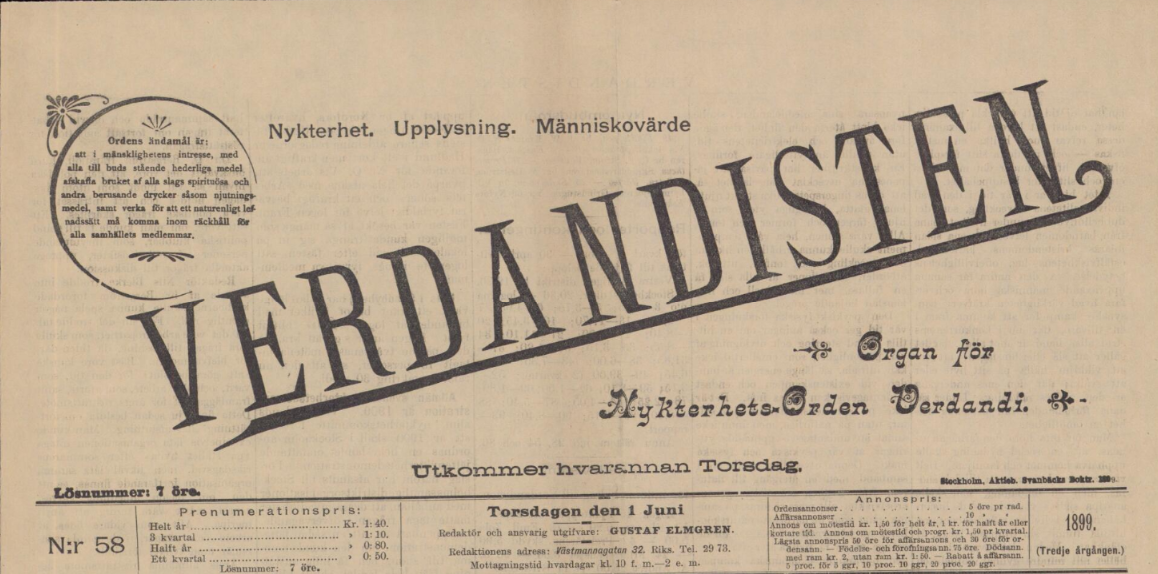
Masthead of Verdandisten, June 1899

Verdandisten was launched on March 4, 1897, as the official organ of the Verdandi movement.

Over the years, Verdandisten carried several subtitles reflecting the organisation's evolving focus, including Organ för Nykterhets-orden Verdandi ("Organ of the Verdandi Temperance Order"), Organ för Verdandi, arbetarnas nykterhetsförbund ("Organ of Verdandi, the workers' temperance association"), Språkrör för socialpolitik och medmänsklighet ("Voice for social policy and humanity"), and En tidning från Verdandi om gemenskap och solidaritet ("A newspaper from Verdandi about community and solidarity").

Special issues and supplements have appeared, including the May Day agitation issue Vårbud (1915) and the youth supplement Verdandistens ungdomsblad (1907–1914).

== Contributors ==
Notable contributors have included John Bååth, Hjalmar Eriksson, and Björn Hasselblad.

== Bibliography ==
- Verdandi (2024). "Verdandisten". Verdandi.
- Libris (2026). "Verdandisten". Kungliga biblioteket.
- Hurd, Madeleine (1994). "Liberals, Socialists, and Sobriety: The Rhetoric of Citizenship in Turn-of-the-Century Sweden". International Labor and Working-Class History. 45. Cambridge University Press: 44–62. doi:10.1017/S014754790001245X.
- Hurd, Madeleine (1996). "Education, Morality, and the Politics of Class in Hamburg and Stockholm, 1870–1914". Journal of Contemporary History. 31 (4). Sage Publications: 619–650. doi:10.1177/002200949603100402.
