= Sofia Spångberg =

Swedish peace activist (1898–1992)

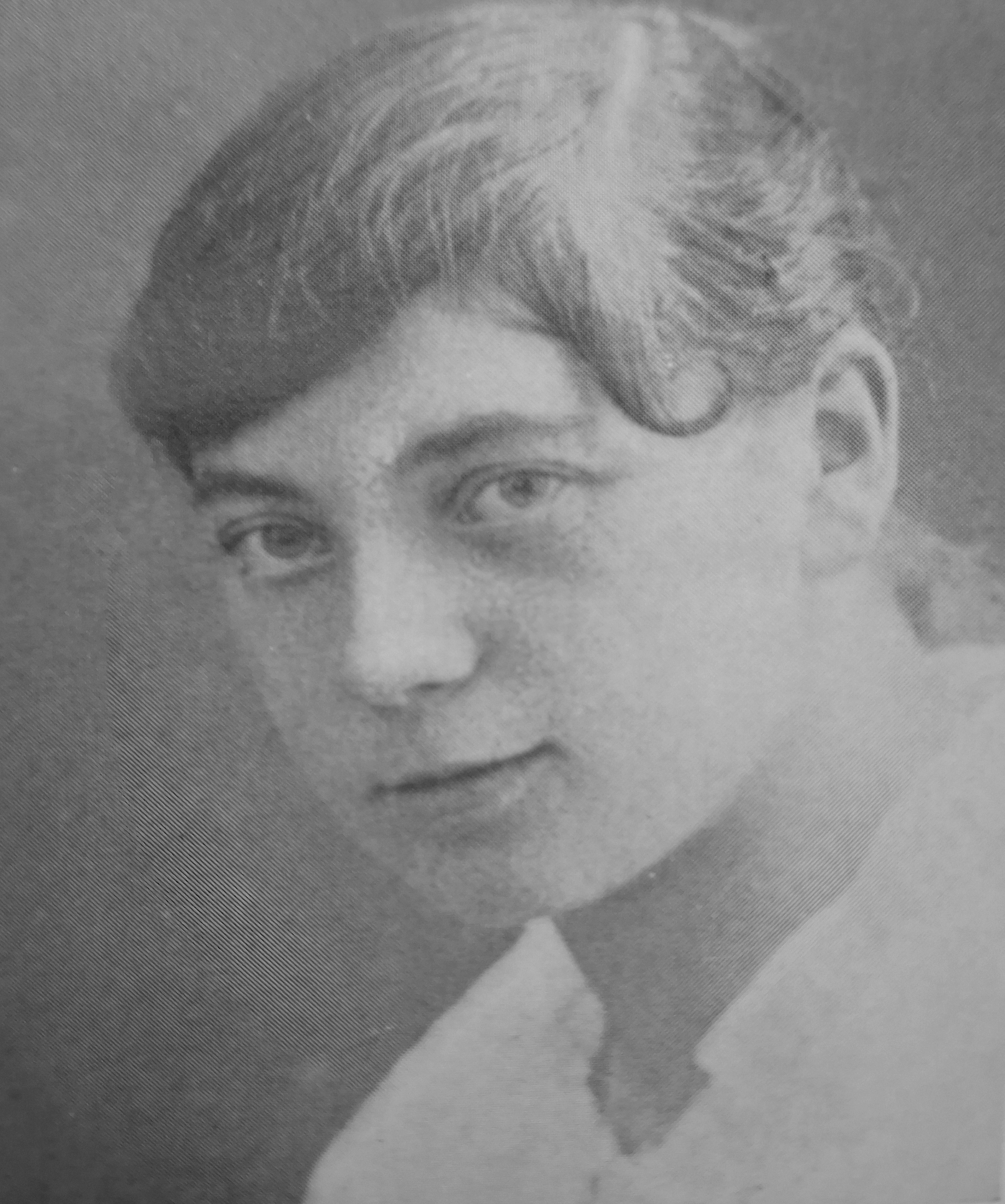
- Sofia Nilsson c. 1915
- Born: Sofia Elisabet Nilsson; 23 October 1898: Södra Ämterud, Eda, Värmland, Sweden; 59.91667°N 12.28333°E
- Died: 9 April 1992 (aged 93); Charlottenberg, Värmland, Sweden
- Resting place: Eda Kyrkogård, Eda, Värmland, Sweden; 59.839275°N 12.313503°E
- Occupations: Peace activist; Political activist
- Known for: Norwegian resistance activities during World War II
- Political party: Swedish Social Democratic Party
- Spouse: August Spångberg (m. 1921; died 1987)
- Children: 1
- Awards: King Haakon VII's Freedom Cross

Sofia Elisabet Spångberg (née Nilsson; 23 October 1898 – 9 April 1992) was a Swedish peace activist and humanitarian known for her assistance to the Norwegian resistance during World War II. She aided victims of the Nazi occupation of Norway by sheltering refugees and assisting couriers crossing the border, for which she was awarded King Haakon VII's Freedom Cross.

Spångberg was active in the labour, peace, and temperance movements in Värmland, where she held leadership roles in women's clubs, cooperative organizations, and peace associations. She advocated nuclear disarmament and international cooperation. The wife of Riksdag member August Spångberg, she maintained an independent political identity as a lifelong member of the Swedish Social Democratic Party, despite her husband's shifting party affiliations.

== Early life ==
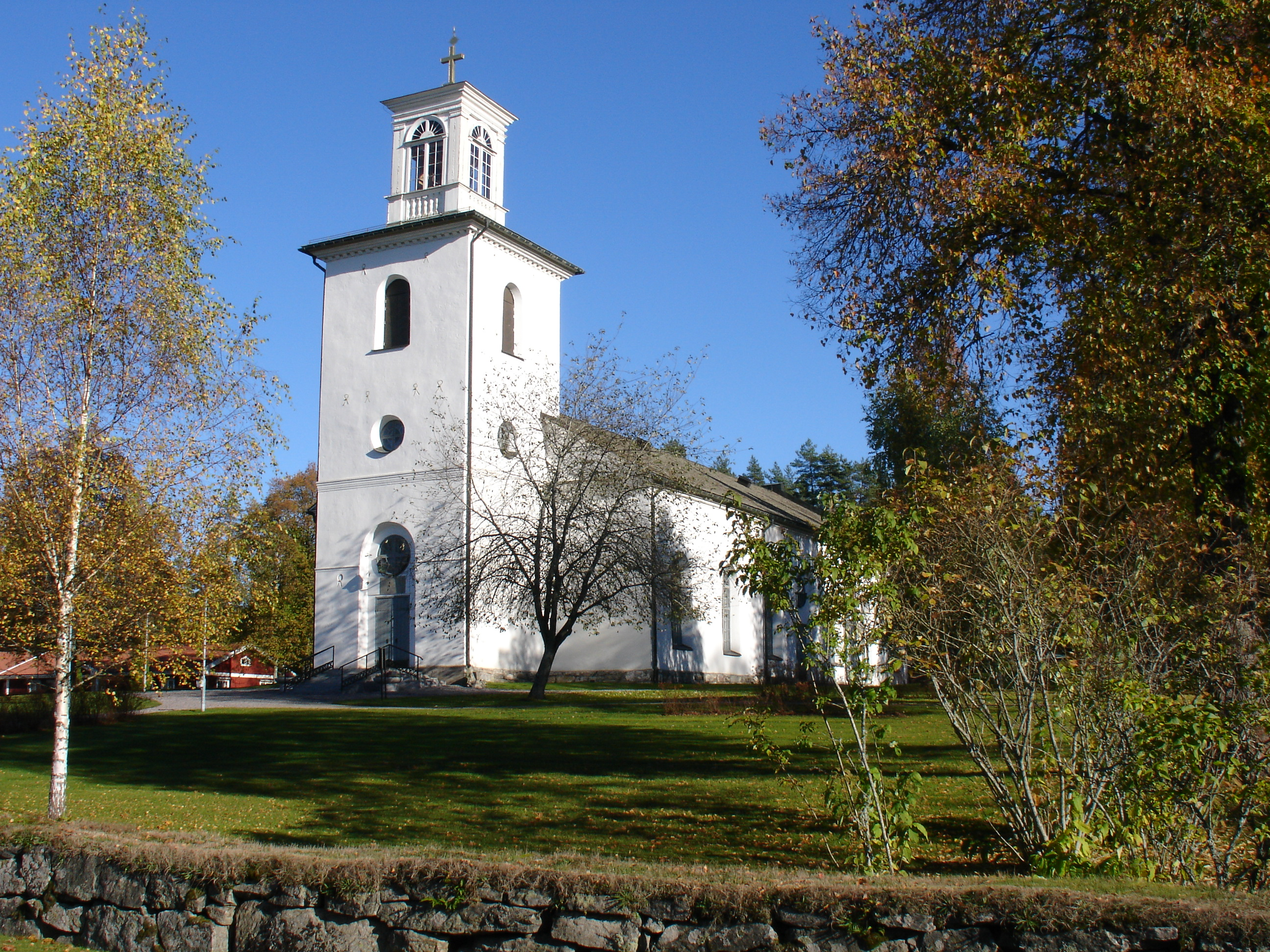
Eda church in Värmland

Sofia Elisabet Nilsson was born in 1898 at Södra Ämterud in Eda, Värmland, to homestead owner Nils Nilsson and Maria Nilsdotter. She received a primary school education (småskola and folkskola) and was confirmed in the Lutheran church in 1913. Her five siblings were Anna Kristina, b. 1891; Ida Maria, b. 1893; Karl Petter, b. 1896; Nils Vilhelm, b. 1901; and Anders Gustaf, b. 1904.

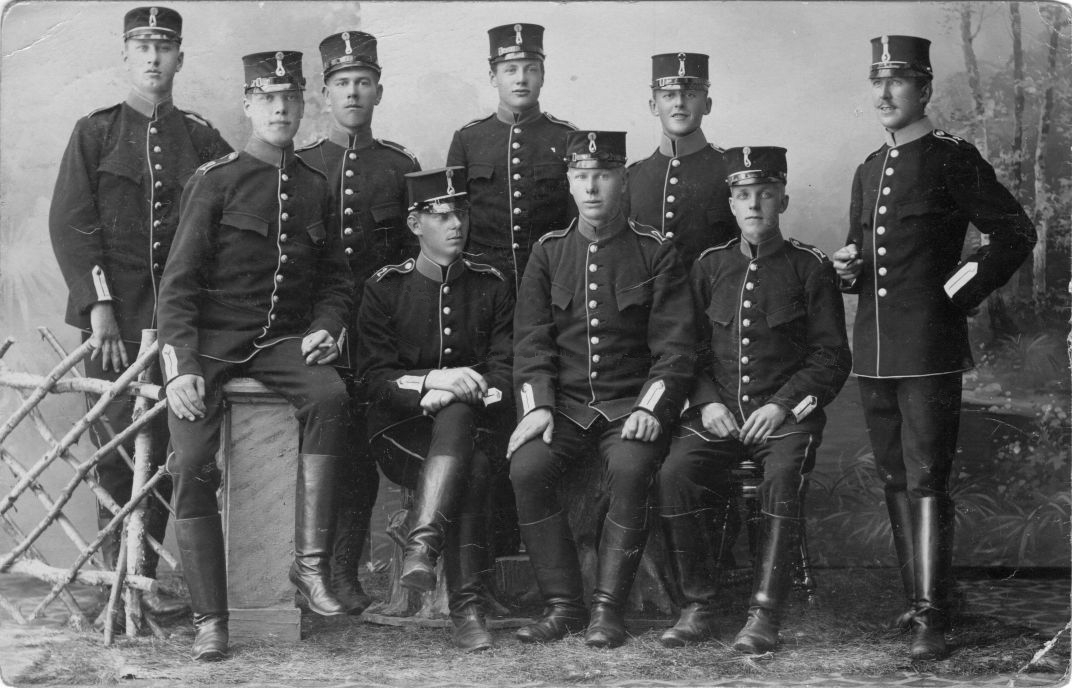
A group of nine Swedish infantrymen on a photo postcard dated 1905

In a 1987 interview, she recalled that an early formative experience with war came during the Swedish-Norwegian dissolution in 1905 when, as a seven-year-old student, she witnessed soldiers marching past her school window. Her teacher warned the children about the possibility of war, causing many to cry. Sofia also recalled how a Swedish soldier visiting her family picked up her eight-month-old brother, Anders, from his crib, saying "I have one like this at home" before starting to cry. These emotional moments had a profound impact on her: "From that time on, I probably got something inside me that war was something terrible and we shouldn't have it."

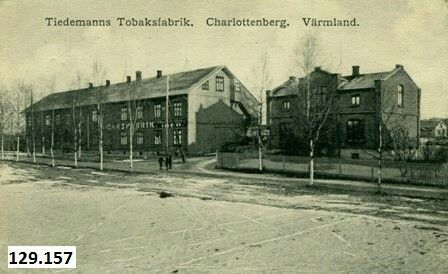
Tiedemanns tobacco factory 1917

In 1910, she began working at Tiedemann Tobacco Factory in Charlottenberg at age twelve, below the legal working age. Her working days were long, starting at six in the morning and ending around six-thirty in the evening, with only Sundays off.

In August 1914, the church bells at the factory rang to announce the outbreak of World War I, and one of her older brothers was called up for military service and stationed at Karungi on the Finland–Sweden border. That same month she witnessed the inauguration of the Peace Monument near Charlottenberg—celebrating 100 years of peace between Norway and Sweden—attended by thousands from both countries, an event made all the more poignant by the simultaneous outbreak of war.

In 1916, Sofia helped establish and became secretary of the Charlottenberg division of the Social Democratic Youth Club (SDUK), a local branch of what is now the Swedish Social Democratic Youth League (SSU). The club was heavily involved in peace activism and eventually grew to over a hundred members. At their first meeting, they sang the pacifist anthem "Varför skola mänskor strida?" (Why should people fight?) and hosted the prominent activist Kata Dahlström who gave a lecture on peace. Together with her future husband August Spångberg, Sofia led the Children's Guild (Charlottenbergs Barngille), a pre-school organization teaching children principles of democracy and solidarity. August described their work: "I and a female club member, Sofia Nilsson, were chosen to lead the Children's Guild in Charlottenberg. The Children's Guild grew and received regular grants from some of the local trade union organizations."

During 1918, Sofia witnessed both refugees from the Finnish Civil War arriving in Eda and the devastating impact of the Spanish flu pandemic, which claimed so many lives that she recalled thirteen funerals taking place in Eda on a single Sunday.

== Marriage and family ==
Sofia Nilsson married August Spångberg on 9 July 1921, in a civil ceremony, and their son Arne was born in 1922. August wrote: "Then there was a welcome addition to our family, with a boy on November 6. Both his mother and I had read Björnstierne. Inspired by his stories, our boy was named Arne."

When August was elected to the Riksdag in 1922, the family maintained their home in Värmland while spending parliamentary sessions in Stockholm. Sofia later recalled: "Since there wasn't much point in me staying alone in Charlottenberg, I came here to August. We thrive in our one-room apartment with a kitchenette in Bromma."

Throughout her life, Sofia maintained an independent political identity as a committed Social Democrat, regardless of her husband's changing party affiliations, which included the Communist Party and the Socialist Party, before he eventually rejoined the Social Democrats in 1938.

They remained married until August's death on 19 June 1987.

== Political activities ==
Throughout her life, Sofia was active in the labour, peace, and temperance movements in Värmland. She served as secretary of the IOGT-NTO lodge Forget-me-not (Förgätmigej), a temperance society, and treasurer of the Eda Peace Association (Eda Fredsförening). She also founded the Social Democratic Women's Club and the Co-operative Women's Guild in Charlottenberg.

Sofia joined the Charlottenberg church council (kyrkofullmäktige), a parish body overseeing education and church matters, which was a separate role from the municipal council (kommunfullmäktige). Despite her political activism, she was prevented from serving on the municipal council because her husband August already held a seat there—at the time, Swedish law did not permit married couples to simultaneously serve as members of the same municipal council.

== World War II resistance ==
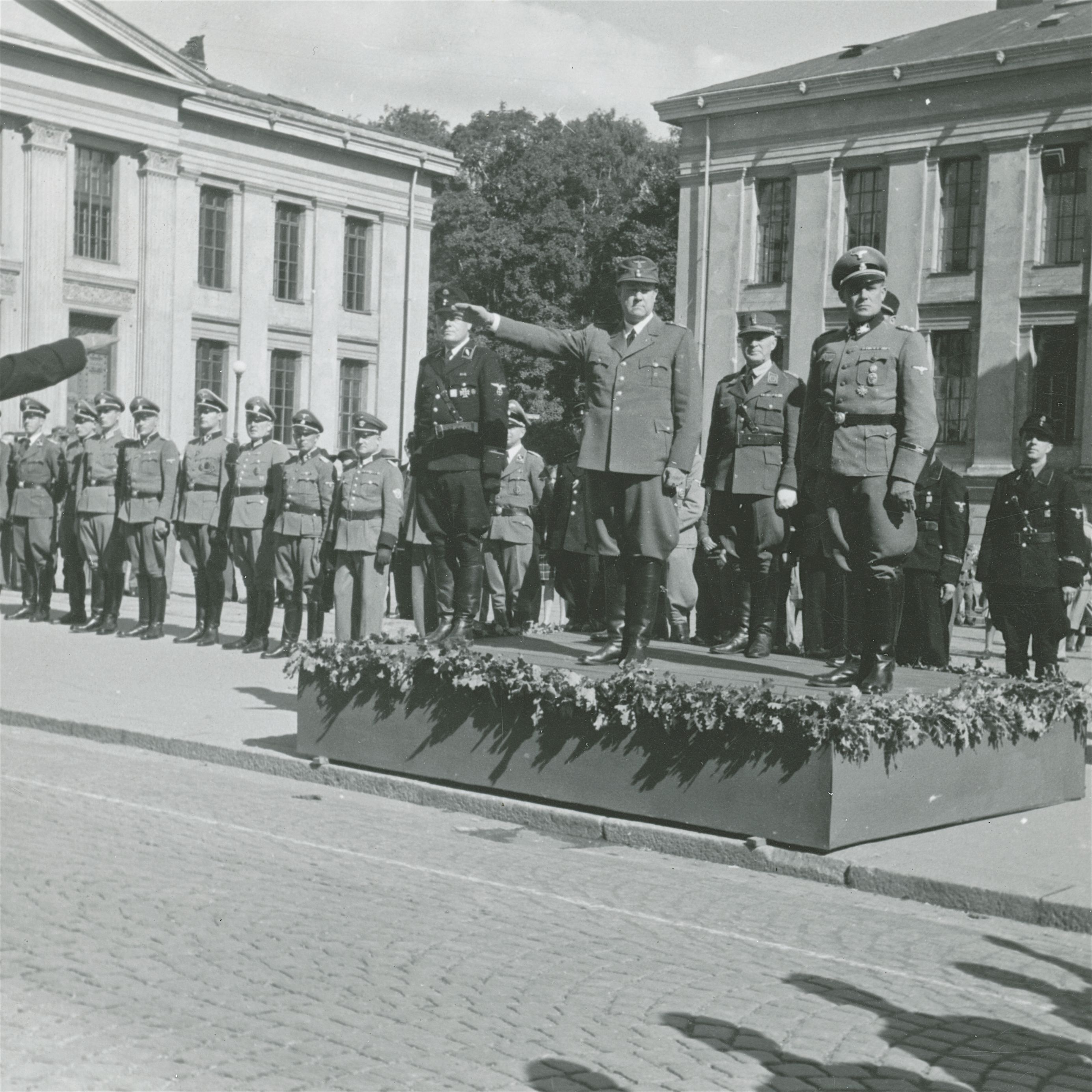
1943 Nazi parade in Oslo, Norway, about 60 miles west of Eda, Sweden

When the Germans occupied Norway on 9 April 1940, the Spångbergs became active in the Norwegian resistance movement. Their home served as a meeting place for couriers crossing the Norway–Sweden border, providing food and shelter for refugees. Sofia helped manage food and logistics, even exhausting their rationing coupons to support those in need. Despite her pacifist principles, Sofia supported resistance efforts while rejecting involvement with the Swedish female defense corps, stating she wanted to "work for peace, not abet war."

Sofia was candid about their dangerous activities: "We had a lot of illegal things going for us. We had couriers here who crossed the border. Sometimes maybe with weapons. Even though I was a peace lover, I knew it was needed. If the Germans had come over, we would have been shot." She also recalled German planes flying over the border and one being shot down over nearby Åmotfors, though "it was all so secret." The couple faced additional danger from a neighbor who Sofia believed spied on them for the Germans.

The illegal work carried significant legal risks for the Spångbergs. August wrote: "Alongside the authorities and government agencies, necessary connections were established with reliable people who were willing to help in Norway's fight against Nazism without compensation." They faced potential imprisonment if caught aiding the resistance, as the Swedish penal code had neutrality provisions against activities that could "damage the friendly relations of the Reich with a foreign power." Despite these dangers, Sofia helped store illegal radio equipment and secret documents in their home.

The occupation of Norway ended on 8 May 1945, when Germany capitulated and Norway was liberated.

== Post-war activities ==
On 11 August 1946, the Border Club (Gränseklubben) was established at a ceremony in Charlottenberg, bringing together Swedish and Norwegian members of the wartime resistance group with the aim of preserving the memory of their joint activities during the occupation.At this gathering Sofia was awarded King Haakon VII's Freedom Cross (Haakon VIIs Frihetskors), the third highest Norwegian war decoration. (Note: At the same ceremony, the Freedom Cross was also awarded to elementary school teacher Edith Carlsson; municipal council chairman and elementary school teacher Eric Carlsson; district prosecutor Gösta Minell; tinsmith Albert Engström; and railway worker William Nordgren, all from Charlottenberg or Eda. The King Haakon VII Freedom Medal (Haakon VIIs Frihetsmedalje), the fourth highest Norwegian war decoration, was awarded to shop assistant Malte Persson, Charlottenberg; parish constable Oscar Solberg, Mitandersfors; and parish constable E. Lindquist, Lersjön.) Sofia noted that many of their Norwegian resistance colleagues went on to distinguished careers: "Of the Norwegians in our group, one became ambassador to India, one was an editor and two were teachers." The club held annual gatherings alternating between Charlottenberg and Kongsvinger, with around forty members recorded in 1959, and remained active until 1976.

In 1963, Sofia re-established the Eda Peace Association as a local branch of the Swedish Peace and Arbitration Society (Svenska Freds- och Skiljedomsföreningen), serving as treasurer for 16 years until heart problems forced her to step down, and campaigning against nuclear weapons in Sweden and overly harsh military training. In her later years, she expressed concern about the resurgence of Nazism in Europe, including a 1985 neo-Nazi demonstration in Växjö that prompted the now-iconic photograph The Woman with the Handbag.

== International travel ==
The Spångbergs traveled extensively in the post-war period. In 1953, they visited England, the Netherlands, and West Germany with friends, touring London shortly after the coronation of Elizabeth II, Amsterdam's museums and canals, and Hamburg. In 1955, the Spångbergs traveled to the United States to visit relatives who had previously emigrated.

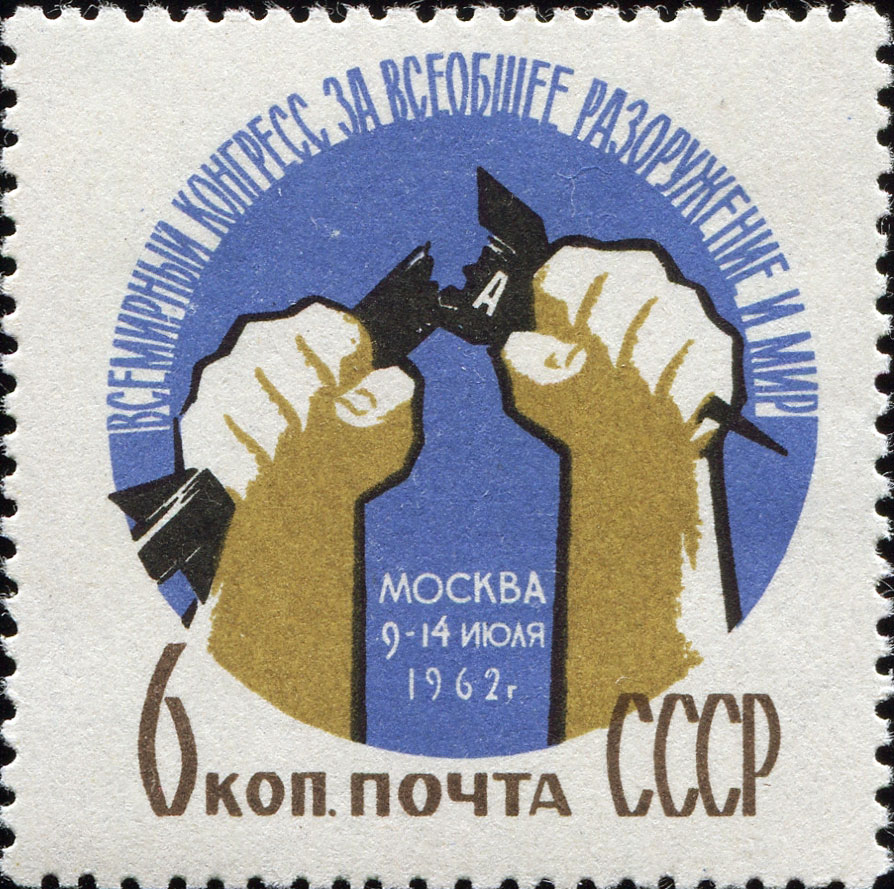
Postage stamp commemorating the 1962 World Congress for Peace and Disarmament in Moscow

In the summer of 1962, Sofia and August Spångberg represented the Swedish Peace Committee at the World Congress for General Disarmament and Peace in Moscow. The congress brought together 2,000 delegates from about 100 nations to address global issues, particularly nuclear disarmament. Sofia Spångberg met Premier Nikita Khrushchev, whom she described as "good-natured" (gemütlich).

The couple also visited Hungary (1961), Romania (1964), East Germany (1964), and Switzerland, Austria, Yugoslavia, and Italy (1965). August summarized their travels: "I will complete my short stories of travel in the West and East in the post-war period... with a mention that everywhere we have been received as friends, everywhere we have met people whose greatest wish has been to live and to live in peace."

== Death and legacy ==
Sofia Spångberg died on 9 April 1992—exactly 52 years after Norway's occupation began. She is buried at Eda church alongside August.

Her life exemplified committed activism for peace and social justice, particularly during the dangerous wartime period when such activities carried significant personal risk. As part of the Norwegian–Swedish resistance network that helped nearly 50,000 people escape Nazi‑occupied Norway, she provided food and shelter to border crossers and stored illegal radio equipment and secret documents.

A taped interview with Sofia from 1 April 1987 is preserved by the Association Archives in Värmland (Föreningsarkivet i Värmland).

== See also ==
- List of peace activists
- Sweden during World War II
- Women in World War II

== Bibliography ==
- Blomqvist, Håkan. "August KF Spångberg". Svenskt biografiskt lexikon.
- Brefält, Jonas (4 January 2019). "Sofia Spångberg became a peace activist in elementary school". Värmlands Folkblad (in Swedish).
- British Pathé (13 April 2014). World Peace Conference: Moscow (1962) – via YouTube.
- "Många frihetskorset till Charlottenberg". Dagens Nyheter (in Swedish). 11 August 1946. p. 8.
- "Riksdagshushållen bor som inneboende men längtar efter omöblerat". Dagens Nyheter (in Swedish). 10 February 1953. p. 13.
- "Illegalt över gränsen: Rustan Älveby besöker Grenseklubben i Eda". Dagens Nyheter (in Swedish). 7 February 1959. p. 24.
- "Grenseklubben som radion presenterade på lördagskvällen". Dagens Nyheter (in Swedish). 8 February 1959. p. 19.
- "Vapensmugglare möts på gränsfest". Dagens Nyheter (in Swedish). 31 August 1959. p. 1.
- Henriksen, Kjetil Erling; Weber, Sindre. "Norske krigsdekorasjoner til personell i handelsflåten 1940–1945: kriterier og praksis" (in Norwegian). Norwegian Ministry of Defence.
- "Sofia Elisabet Spångberg". Gravar.se.
- "World Congress on General Disarmament and Peace". Marx Memorial Library.
- Moström, Jenny. "Sofia Elisabet Spångberg". Svenskt kvinnobiografiskt lexikon.
- Moström, Jenny (2018). Gerda Hellberg, Sofia Spängberg och Ellen Eriksson: tre värmländska kvinnliga politiker som döljs i arkiven (Academic essay) (in Swedish). Karlstad University.
- Riksarkivet. "Eda Church Archives, Birth and Baptismal Records, SE/VA/13091/C/11 (1895–1905)". sok.riksarkivet.se (in Swedish).
- Riksarkivet. "Nilsson, Sofia Elizabeth: Censuses (Sweden's population) 1930". sok.riksarkivet.se (in Swedish).
- Riksarkivet. "Census 1910 – Eda parish, Värmland County". sok.riksarkivet.se (in Swedish).
- Riksarkivet. "Eda Church Archives, Confirmation Books, SE/VA/13091/DI/2 (1895–1939)". sok.riksarkivet.se (in Swedish).
- Riksarkivet. "Statistics Sweden (SCB) – collection item, Parish register extract, SE/RA/420401/11/H 1 AAA/144 (1930)". sok.riksarkivet.se (in Swedish).
- Skodvin, Magne; Soleim, Marianne Neerland. "Grenselos". Store norske leksikon.
- Spångberg, August (1966). I tidens ström (PDF) (in Swedish). Karlstad: Bok o. bild. OCLC 504076135. Archived from the original (PDF) on 18 August 2010.
- "Spångbergsarkivet: originalförteckning" (PDF). Arkivcentrum Värmland.
