= Viktor Herou =

Swedish politician (1889–1970)

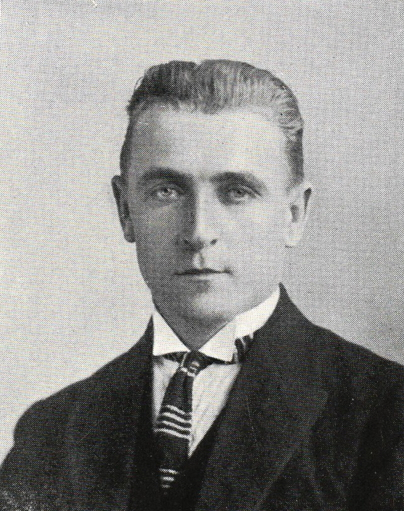
Viktor Herou

Johan Viktor Herou (17 February 1889, in Österfärnebo – 21 February 1970) was a Swedish politician from Österfärnebo. Herou dedicated a large part of his political career to the upliftment of the small peasantry.

Herou was the son of agricultural labourers and toiled as a forest worker during his youth. Herou was a delegate at the 1914 congress of the Social Democratic Youth League. He sided with the Social Democratic Left Party (later Communist Party) in the split of the Social Democratic Labour Party. Herou received communist political training in Soviet Russia. He was elected to parliament in the 1921 election, being one of seven deputies of the first Communist Party parliamentary faction.

He was again elected to parliament in 1928, 1932 and 1936. When the Communist Party was divided in October 1929, Herou sided with the dissident Communist Party (later renamed Socialist Party) led by Karl Kilbom and Nils Flyg. When the Socialist Party parliamentary group was divided over a parliamentary motion on the Spanish Civil War (a debate in which the majority of the parliamentarians with Kilbom at their helm implied that Flyg had adopted a too ambivalent position towards the defense of the Spanish Republic), Herou took a neutralist position. Albeit not explicitly supporting Flyg's line, Herou positioned himself closer to Flyg than Kilbom's group.

In 1940 Herou broke with the Socialist Party and joined the Farmers' League (later renamed as the Centre Party). Herou became a prominent local politician in Österfärnebo, being active in municipal politics until 1952. In 1964 he became the interim chairman of the newly founded Österfärnebo branch of the Swedish National Pensioners' Organisation (PRO).
