= Verdandi (organization) =

Swedish social policy organization founded in 1896

- Verdandi, arbetarnas socialpolitiska organisation
- Named after: Verðandi
- Formation: February 2, 1896; 130 years ago
- Founded at: Stockholm, Sweden
- Type: Workers' social policy organization
- Headquarters: Fatbursgatan 8, Stockholm
- Federation Chair: Emmeli Wulfstrand
- Publication: Verdandisten
- Website: verdandi.se

Verdandi (formally Verdandi, arbetarnas socialpolitiska organisation) is a Swedish worker's social policy organization founded in 1896 in Stockholm as a secular breakaway from the International Organisation of Good Templars. From its founding it aligned itself with the Swedish labour movement, combining temperance advocacy with broader demands for social and political reform.

Verdandi's current programs include Rättvisekontor, which assists people in navigating welfare and legal systems; Brukarkraft, a cooperative giving users of social services influence over service design; and Koll på läget, a program for young people addressing consumption pressure, social media, and gambling risk.

The organization also engages in public advocacy on alcohol and drug policy and criminal justice. It supports the Systembolaget system for regulating the sale of alcohol and participates in the Kontantupproret movement opposing a purely digital monetary system.

== Founding ==
Verdandi was founded in 1896, when members of the International Organisation of Good Templars (IOGT) Saint Göran Lodge in Stockholm broke away to form their own organization. On January 27, 1895, sugar refinery worker J.E. Pettersson was denied membership because he was not a believer; IOGT statutes limited membership to those who professed a "faith in an almighty God." In December 1895, the lodge appointed a seven-person committee to draft proposals for a new, secular organization. A public meeting followed on January 5, 1896, and Nykterhetsorden Verdandi was formally constituted on February 2. From the outset it aligned itself with the emerging Swedish labor movement, advocating for temperance but also for political and societal solutions including housing reform, universal education, fair wages, an eight-hour workday, and universal suffrage.

== Name ==
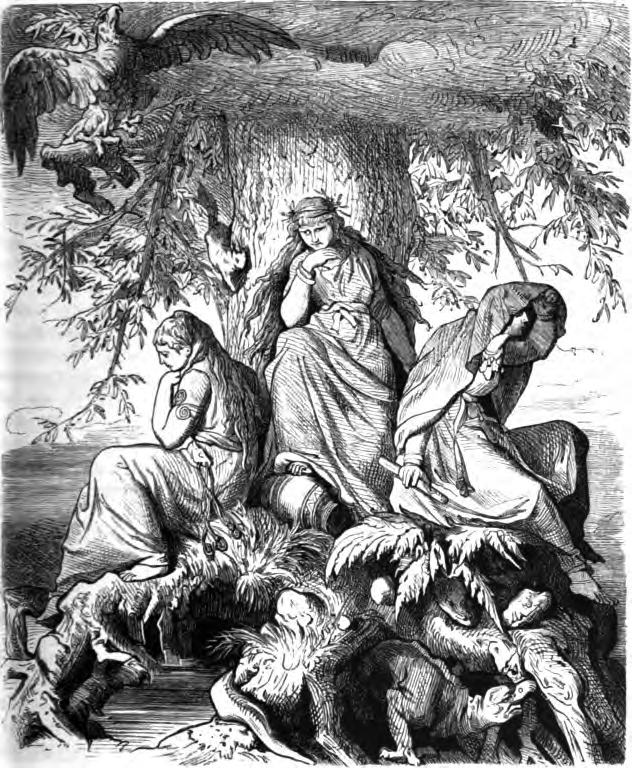
Urðr, Verðandi, and Skuld beneath the world tree.

The organization was founded as Nykterhetsorden Verdandi (the Temperance Order Verdandi), abbreviated as NOV. The name underwent several changes reflecting the organization's evolving identity. In 1937 the governing body dropped the term "Orden" (Order), renaming it Nykterhets Organisationen Verdandi, retaining the NOV abbreviation. In 1989, the temperance reference was dropped entirely and the name became Verdandi – arbetarnas organisation för gemenskap och solidaritet (Verdandi – the workers' organization for community and solidarity). A final adjustment in 1997 settled on the current official name, Verdandi, arbetarnas socialpolitiska organisation (Verdandi, the workers' social policy organization), commonly known simply as Verdandi.

The organization's name derives from Verðandi, one of the three Norns in Norse mythology. The Norns are female beings who live by Urðarbrunnr (the well of Urðr) and weave the fates of all people and gods. The three Norns — Urðr, Verðandi, and Skuld — bear names meaning "that which was," "that which is becoming," and "that which will be."

== Membership ==
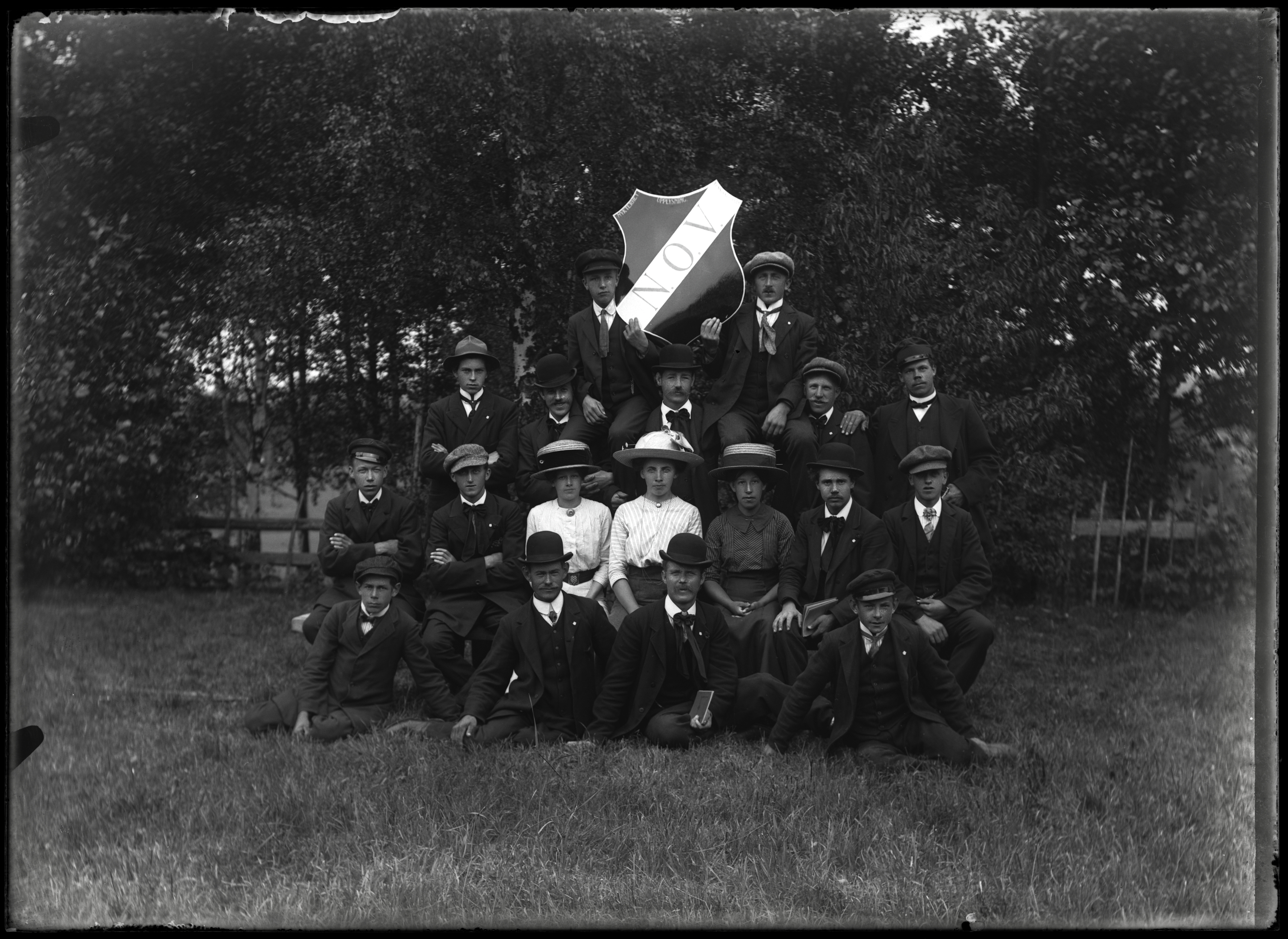
Group portrait of members of NOV, Skaraborg, Västergötland, Sweden, c. 1910.

Verdandi grew rapidly after its founding. According to a 1914 statistical survey of Swedish temperance societies, the organization had 2,732 members in 1900, rising to 13,099 in 1905 and 23,803 in 1912, by which point it maintained 377 lodges and 75 children's lodges across Sweden. By early 1913 membership had reached approximately 26,000, the largest percentage growth of any Swedish temperance organization in its early years. The first lodge outside Sweden was founded in 1899 at Kjøge, Norway, and a Danish federation operated from 1903 until 1928. During this period Verdandi also established lodges among Swedish immigrant communities in the United States.

The organization reached its broadest geographic presence around 1907–1915 before declining gradually through the interwar period. Membership recovered and peaked in the 1970s at over 40,000, before falling sharply in subsequent decades. Today Verdandi has approximately 4,600 members in Sweden.

== Ideology ==
At its founding, Verdandi distinguished itself from other Swedish temperance organizations by linking sobriety explicitly to personal and class struggle. Where mainstream temperance movements attribute alcohol abuse to individual weakness, Verdandi argues that intemperance is a symptom of capitalist exploitation, and that the most effective way to combat addiction is to improve people's social and economic conditions.

Verdandi's stated priorities include: elimination of poverty; opposition to harmful use of alcohol and other drugs; support for universal and solidaristic welfare policy; opposition to racism, xenophobia and LGBTQ+-phobia; and support for gender equality.

== Programs ==
=== Rättvisekontor ===
A core part of Verdandi's practical work is its network of Rättvisekontor (Justice Offices), which provide free assistance to people navigating contact with authorities, completing official forms, and asserting their rights within Sweden's welfare and legal systems. The offices are particularly active in economically disadvantaged areas where residents may lack familiarity with bureaucratic processes.

=== Brukarkraft ===
In 2015 Verdandi established Brukarkraft (User Influence), a national center giving people who use publicly funded social services—such as addiction treatment and supported housing—a formal say in how those services are run. Originally funded by the Swedish Inheritance Fund, it became an independent cooperative in 2018. It provides a structured review process in which people with direct experience of a service interview current users and report findings back to the service and its funders.

=== Koll på läget ===
Koll på läget (Checking the Situation) is a study-circle program for young people aged 15 to 25, developed with support from the Swedish Consumer Agency and the youth financial-vulnerability organization eksam (Ekonomiskt samverkanscentrum) in Örebro. The program addresses consumption pressure, social media, advertising, and gambling risk, with participants producing films or podcasts as a counterpoint to consumer culture.

== Public advocacy ==
=== Alcohol sales policy ===
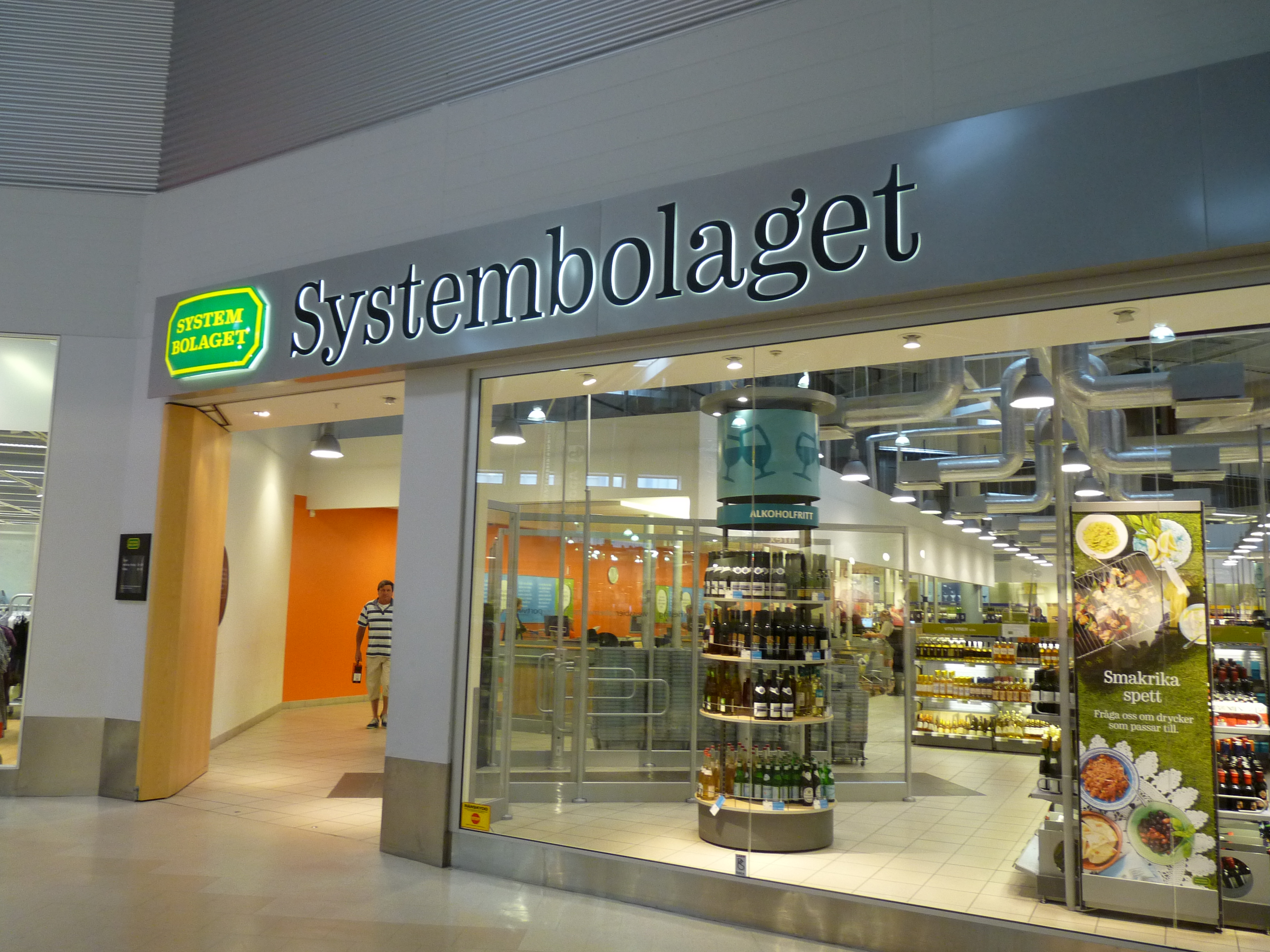
Systembolaget store in Stockholm.

Verdandi remains active in Swedish public debate, opposing proposals to introduce direct sales of alcohol outside the Systembolaget regulated store network, arguing that the monopoly serves public health by controlling availability and limiting aggressive marketing

=== Drug policy ===
Verdandi advocates what it terms a "third way" drug policy, rejecting both the liberalization of drug laws—including proposals to decriminalize personal use or legalize cannabis—and a punitive approach based on harsher sentencing for people who use drugs. The organization supports a state inquiry into the effects of current drug laws and argues that law enforcement resources should be directed at organized crime rather than individual users.

=== Criminal justice policy ===
Verdandi opposes proposals to increase the severity of criminal sentencing, including life sentences for minors, arguing that harsher punishment has limited deterrent effect. The organization calls instead for early intervention in schools and youth services, rehabilitation-focused incarceration, and support with housing and employment after release.

=== Kontantupproret ===
The organization also participates in the Kontantupproret (Cash Rebellion) movement, which seeks to preserve cash payment rights for people without access to digital banking.

== Organization ==
Verdandi's highest decision-making body is its congress, which meets every three years. The most recent congress was held in Borlänge in May 2024, at which Emmeli Wulfstrand was re-elected to a second term as federation chair. The next congress is scheduled for 2027 in Eskilstuna.

== Publication and awards ==
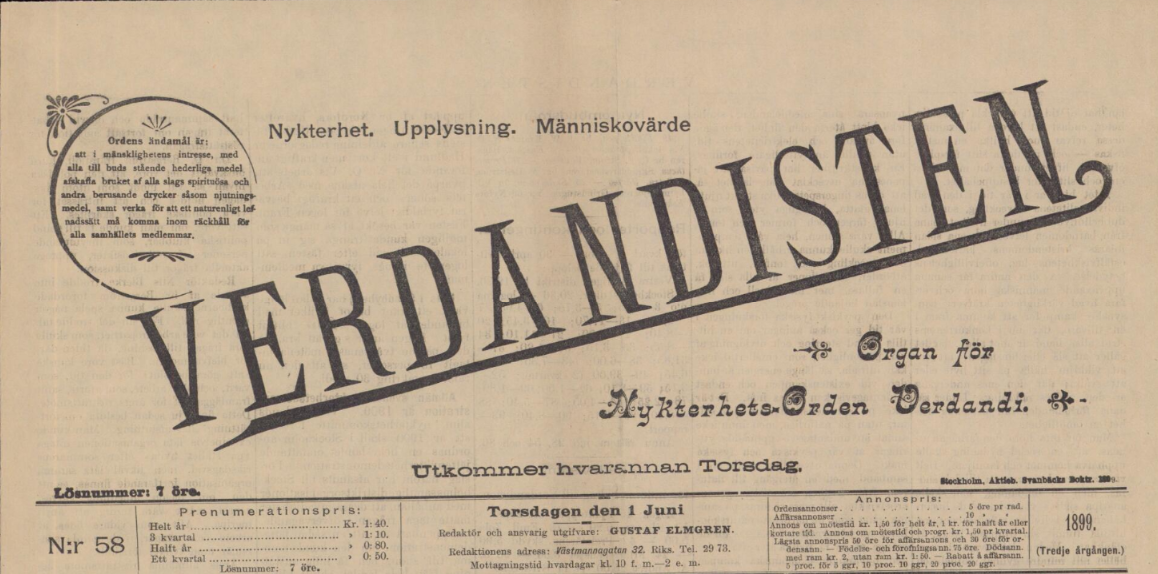
Masthead of Verdandisten, 1899.

Verdandi publishes Verdandisten, a journal covering the organization's social policy work and broader issues of social justice and temperance.

The Verdandiljuset prize (The Verdandi Light) is awarded to a person or organization making significant efforts toward social justice policy. The 2024 recipient was journalist and poet Göran Greider.

The SPIRA prize is awarded to Verdandi members who exemplify the organization's grassroots social justice work. The 2024 recipient was Ann-Mari Wulfstrand-Byhlin, former federation chair of Verdandi.

== Sources ==
- "Öfver en half Million organiserade nykterhetsvänner". Chicago-Bladet. Chicago, Illinois. January 28, 1913.
- Haggren, Gunvi; Fäldt, Inge; Båth, Magnus; Koivisto, Marja; Tengling, Ulla (2025). Den röda tråden: Verdandi och kampen för social rättvisa från 1896 till idag (PDF). Verdandi socialpolitisk debatt. Vol. 108. Stockholm: Åtta45. ISSN 0348-5102.
- "Verdandis Alkohol- och drogpolitiska program 2024" (PDF). Verdandi. 2025. * "Verdandis Kriminalpolitiska program" (PDF). Verdandi. 2025. * "Koll på läget – handledning för studiecirkelledare". Verdandi. 2026.
- Forskaren. Minneapolis, Minnesota: Forskarens Publishing Co. 1906–1915.
- Guinchard, Joseph (1914). Sweden: Historical and Statistical Handbook. Vol. 1. Stockholm: P.A. Norstedt & Söner. pp. 744–745.
- Hurd, Madeleine (1996). "Education, Morality, and the Politics of Class in Hamburg and Stockholm, 1870–1914". Journal of Contemporary History. 31 (4): 619–650. JSTOR 261041.
- Jensen, Richard L. "Swedish Immigrants and Life in Utah". Utah History Encyclopedia.
- Lundkvist, Sven; Andrae, Carl-Göran (1993). Verdandi, the Workers' Temperance Society 1881–1950 (Report). Uppsala University / Swedish Social Science Data Service. doi:10.5878/002687.
- Simek, Rudolf (1993). Dictionary of Northern Mythology. Cambridge: D.S. Brewer. ISBN 0-85991-369-4.
- "Organization and Lodge Records". Swenson Swedish Immigration Research Center, Augustana College.
- "Om Verdandi". Verdandi. 2024.
- "Press releases and statements". Verdandi. 2026.
- Koivisto, Marja (February 2, 2021). "Anniversary year! Verdandi turns 125!". Verdandi.
- Koivisto, Marja (May 23, 2024). "Verdandis 50e kongress i Borlänge: Emmeli Wulfstrand omvald till förbundsordförande". Verdandi.
- Zilian, T. (2015). "Good Templars". The SAGE Encyclopedia of Alcohol: Social, Cultural, and Historical Perspectives. Vol. 3. SAGE Publications. pp. 626–627. doi:10.4135/9781483331096.n228.
