= Österfärnebo =

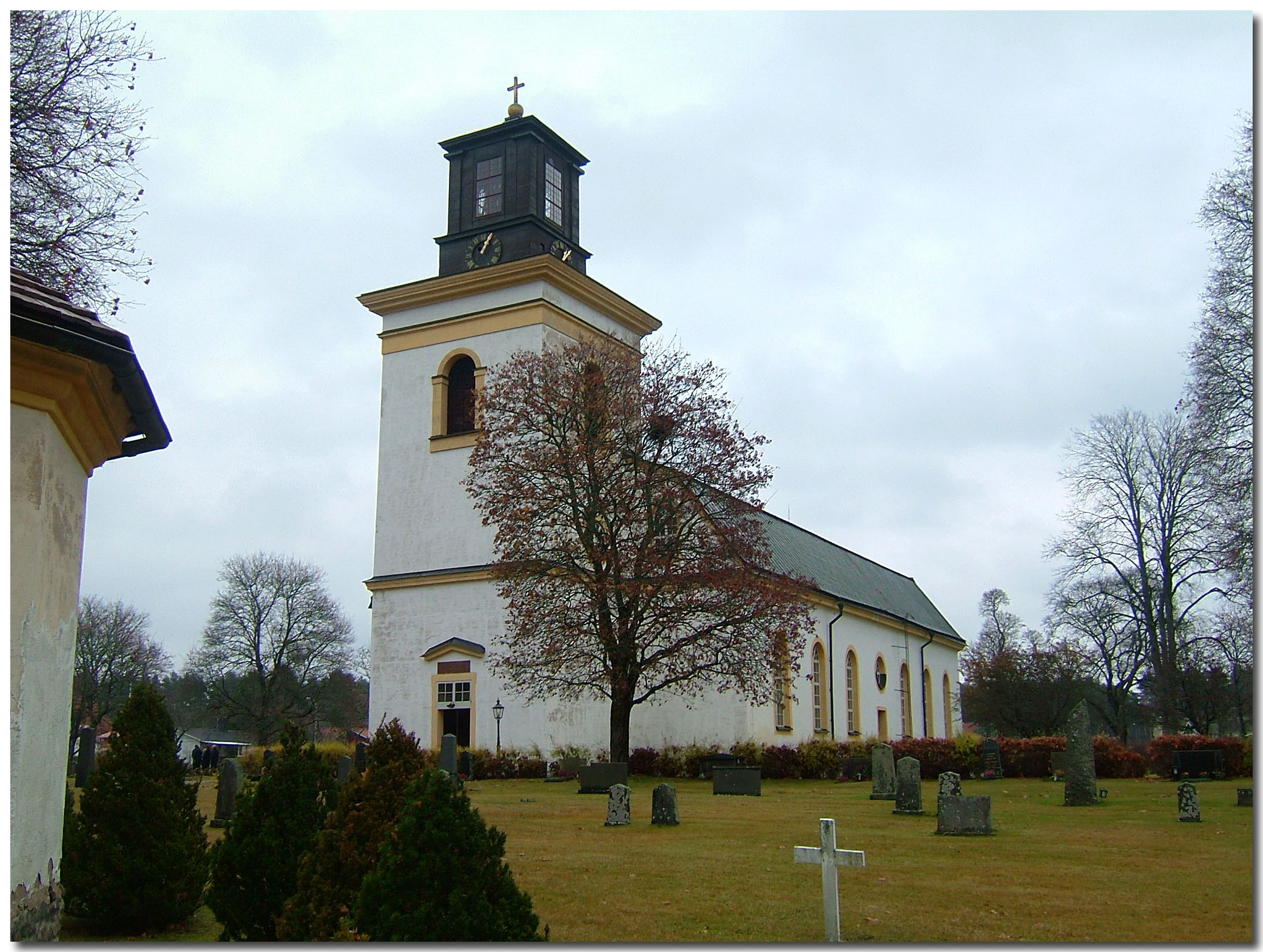
- Österfärnebo church

- Location within Sweden Gävleborg Location within Sweden
- Coordinates: 60°18′N 16°48′E
- Country: Sweden
- Province: Gästrikland
- County: Gävleborg County
- Municipality: Sandviken Municipality

Area
  - Total: 1.16 km^{2} (0.45 sq mi)

Population (31 December 2010)
  - Total: 483
  - Density: 415/km^{2} (1,070/sq mi)
- Time zone: UTC+1 (CET)
  - Summer (DST): UTC+2 (CEST)

Österfärnebo (Swedish pronunciation: [œstɛrˈfæ̂ːɳɛbʊ]) is a locality situated in Sandviken Municipality, Gävleborg County, Sweden with 483 inhabitants in 2010.

== Sports ==
The following sports clubs are located in Österfärnebo:

- Österfärnebo IF
