= Jacob Spångberg =

Swedish ice hockey player

- Born: June 12, 1994 (age 31) Täby, Sweden
- Height: 6 ft 2 in (188 cm)
- Weight: 196 lb (89 kg; 14 st 0 lb)
- Position: Defence
- Shoots: Left
- SHL team: AIK IF
- NHL draft: Undrafted
- Playing career: 2013–present

Jacob Spångberg (born June 12, 1994) is a Swedish ice hockey defenceman. During the 2021–22 season he played for Väsby IK of the HockeyEttan league.

Spångberg made his Swedish Hockey League debut playing with AIK IF during the 2013–14 SHL season.
