= Eva von Bahr =

Eva von Bahr may refer to:

- Eva von Bahr (make-up artist) (born 1968), Swedish make-up artist and hair stylist
- Eva von Bahr (physicist) (1874–1962), Swedish physicist and teacher
