= J. P. Dahlén =

Swedish politician (1881–1938)

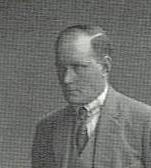
- J. P. Dahlén in 1922

Member of the Swedish Parliament for Norrbotten
- In office 1920–1932

Personal details
- Died: 1938 Jukkasjärvi
- Party: Social Democrat (–1917), Left Socialist/Communist (1917–1929), Communist (Kilbom group) (1930–)
- Profession: Miner

Jonas Petter Dahlén (also called "Dahlén i Kiruna", meaning 'Dahlén in Kiruna'; 14 November 1881 – 23 January 1938) was a Swedish mine worker and politician.

Dahlén was born in Ragunda. He was elected to the second chamber of the Swedish parliament, from the northern constituency of Norrbotten, representing the Social Democratic Left Party. He was one of seven members of parliament belonging to the Social Democratic Left Party. When the party metamorphosed into the Communist Party of Sweden upon adopting the twenty-one conditions of the Communist International, Dahlén was the sole parliamentarian that remained in the party. He was re-elected in 1921 as a Communist Party candidate. He remained in parliament until 1932.

In October 1929, the Communist Party went through a major split. The group led by Karl Kilbom and Nils Flyg was expelled by the Executive Committee of the Communist International. The expelled grouping reorganized themselves as a separate Communist Party of Sweden. All communist parliamentarians, except for Dahlén, sided with Kilbom. Dahlén did however, after a few months of vacillating, join the Kilbom-led Communist Party. Dahlén died in Jukkasjärvi.
