= Carl Winberg =

Swedish politician and newspaper editor

Carl Winberg SP K S
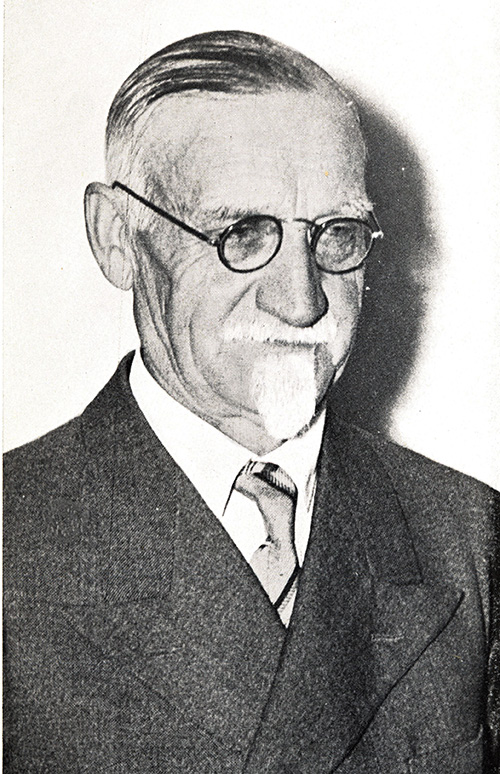
- Carl Winberg c. 1945

Leader of the Communist party
- In office 1917–1918 Serving with Zeth Höglund
- Preceded by: Position created
- Succeeded by: Ernst Åström & Karl Kilbom

Member of the Riksdag's Second Chamber
- In office 1911–1912
- Constituency: Stockholm City constituency
- In office 1912–1917_{March}
- In office 1914_{Sep}–1917
- Constituency: Stockholm City second constituency

Member of the Riksdag's First Chamber
- In office 1919–1922
- Constituency: Norrbotten County
- In office 1922–1930
- Constituency: Västerbotten and Norrbotten County

Personal details
- Born: 6 July 1867 Karlstad, Karlstad Municipality, Värmland County, Sweden
- Died: 22 February 1954 (aged 86) Stockholm, Stockholm County, Sweden
- Party: Sweden's Social Democratic Left Party/ Communist Party (1917–1929); Socialist Party (he joined the faction in 1929)
- Other political affiliations: Social Democratic Party (until 1917)
- Profession: Politician, news editor
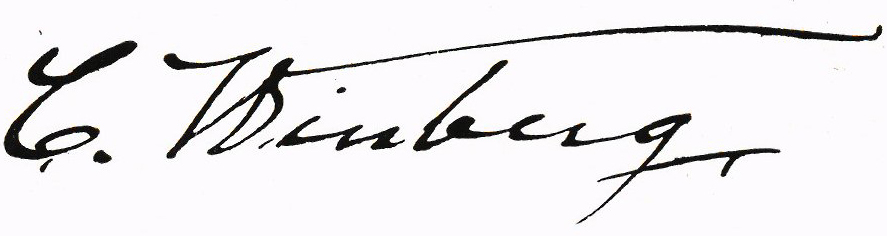
- Signature

Carl Winberg (born 6 July 1867 in Karlstad, died 22 February 1954 in Stockholm) was a Swedish communist politician and newspaper editor.

== Biography ==
Winberg was worked as a locomotive cleaner from 1891 to 1906 and belonged to the Kilboms faction in the Swedish Communist Party. He was a member of the Swedish Rail Workers’ Union from 1906 to 1909, a faction in the Swedish Trade Union Confederation, and in 1909 became an editor for the union's newspaper Signalen.

He was from 1911 to 1914 a Member of Parliament (social democrat) in the Swedish Riksdag's lower house (also known as Andra kammaren or Second Chamber) for the Stockholm City constituency and from 1912 till 1914 for Stockholm City second constituency. He wasn't reelected at the March general elections but returned in the September general election and served from 1914_{Sep} till 1917 (social democrat) for the same constituency. Together with the left-socialist opposition inside the social democrats, he left the party in 1917 and formed Sweden's Social Democratic Left Party, with the Social Democratic Left-Group as their parliament party. From the early Riksdag from 1919 to 1930 (communist) Winberg belonged to the upper house of the Riksdag (första kammaren or First Chamber) for the constituency of Norrbotten County until 1921 and from 1922 onwards, he served the constituency of Västerbotten and Norrbotten County.

Winberg belonged to the faction inside the Social Democratic Left Party that changed the name from Social Democratic Left Party (SSV) to Sweden's Communist Party in 1921. During the 1924 split in the communist party, he joined the Moscow-friendly faction, and when there was another split in the Moscow-friendly faction in 1929, Winberg joined the Kilboms-faction that later became the Socialist Party. Together with Ture Nerman, they were the only two communists in the First Chamber.

Later in 1929, Winberg was expelled together with the majority of the Communist Party's members as the Party followed the Stalinist course. In the 1930s, Winberg was active in the Communist opposition led by Karl Kilbom, independent from Moscow and opposing Stalinism.

Winberg's memoir titled From Kvarnberget to Helgeandsholmen: the fate of a crofter's boy's fate (Från Kvarnberget till Helgeandsholmen : en torparpojkes livsöden) was published in 1945.

== Revolutionary committee ==
In 1917 during the Russian Revolution, and the Junikravallerna (Swedish July riots), Winberg had assembled a secret revolutionary committee with the purpose of appointing a revolutionary government. It was decided to pause the development of the committee and to wait for a signal.

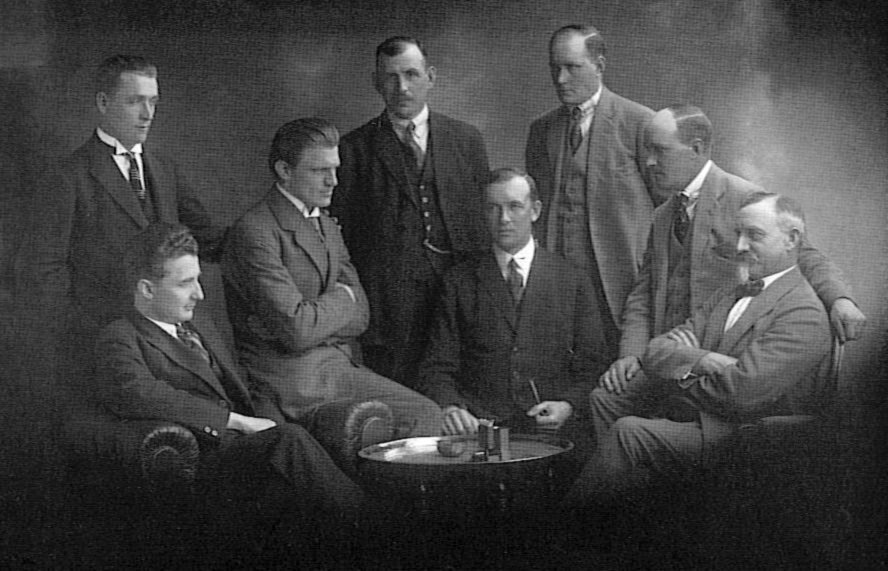
Carl Winberg, sitting in the right corner, together with the other communists in the Riksdag in 1922.

== More literature ==
- Winberg, Carl (1945). Från Kvarnberget till Helgeandsholmen : en torparpojkes livsöden. Stockholm: Arbetarkultur. OCLC 39933136.
